= St. Louis Cardinals all-time roster =

List of baseball players

This list is complete and up-to-date through the 2026 season.

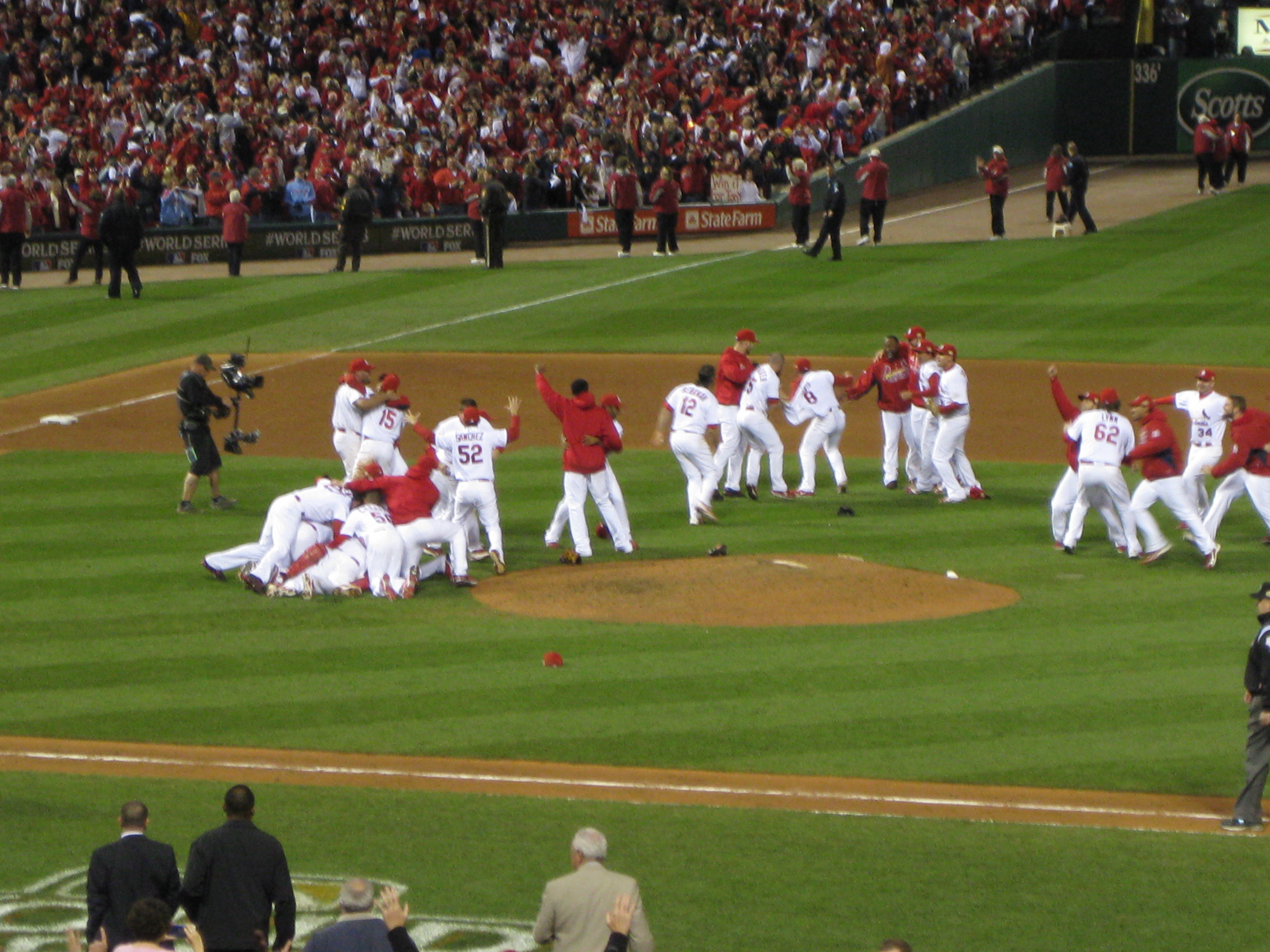
The 2011 St. Louis Cardinals after winning the World Series.

The following is a list of players who have appeared in at least one game for the St. Louis Cardinals franchise, including the 1882 St. Louis Brown Stockings, the 1883–1898 St. Louis Browns, and the 1899 St. Louis Perfectos.

Players in Bold are members of the National Baseball Hall of Fame.

Players in Italics have had their numbers retired by the team.

* designates elected as a manager.

== A ==
- Ody Abbott, OF, 1910
- Ted Abernathy, P, 1970
- Juan Acevedo, P, 1998–1999
- Babe Adams, P, 1906
- Buster Adams, OF, 1939, 1943, 1945–1946
- Jim Adams, C, 1890
- Joe Adams, P, 1902
- Matt Adams, 1B, 2012–2018
- Sparky Adams, 3B, 1930–1933
- Jim Adduci, 1B/OF, 1983
- Tommie Agee, OF, 1973
- Juan Agosto, P, 1991–1992
- Eddie Ainsmith, C, 1921–1923
- Gibson Alba, P, 1988
- Cy Alberts, P, 1910
- Jorge Alcalá, P, 2025
- Sandy Alcántara, P, 2017
- **Grover Cleveland Alexander**, P, 1926–1929
- Nin Alexander, C/OF, 1884
- Luis Alicea, 2B, 1988, 1991–1994, 1996
- **Dick Allen**, 1B/3B, 1970
- Ethan Allen, OF, 1933
- Neil Allen, P, 1983–1985
- Ron Allen, 1B, 1972
- Matty Alou, OF/1B, 1971–1973
- Tom Alston, 1B, 1954–1957
- **Walter Alston**, 1B, 1936
- George Altman, OF, 1963
- Luis Alvarado, SS/2B, 1974, 1976
- Brant Alyea, OF, 1972
- Rubén Amaro Sr., SS, 1958
- Red Ames, P, 1915–1919
- Bryan Anderson, C/1B, 2010, 2012
- Craig Anderson, P, 1961
- Dwain Anderson, SS, 1972–1973
- Ferrell Anderson, C, 1953
- George Anderson, OF, 1918
- John Anderson, P, 1962
- Marlon Anderson, 2B/OF, 2004
- Mike Anderson, OF, 1976–1977
- John Andrews, P, 1973
- Nate Andrews, P, 1937, 1939
- Joaquín Andújar, P, 1981–1985
- Pat Ankenman, SS, 1936
- Rick Ankiel, OF/P, 1999–2001, 2004, 2007–2009
- Dean Anna, PH, 2015
- John Antonelli, 3B/1B/2B, 1944–1945
- Nolan Arenado, 3B, 2021–2025
- Shawn Armstrong, P, 2024
- Harry Arndt, 2B/3B, 1905–1907
- Scott Arnold, P, 1988
- René Arocha, P, 1993–1995
- Randy Arozarena, OF, 2019
- Luis Arroyo, P, 1955
- Rudy Arroyo, P, 1971
- Harry Atkinson, OF, 1985
- Bryan Augenstein, P, 2011
- Dennis Aust, P, 1965–1966
- John Axford, P, 2013
- Benny Ayala, OF, 1977
- Manny Aybar, P, 1997–1999

== B ==
- Les Backman, P, 1909–1910
- Harrison Bader, OF, 2017–2022
- Joshua Báez, OF, 2026–present
- Bill Bailey, P, 1921–1922
- Cory Bailey, P, 1995–1996
- Doug Bair, P, 1981–1983, 1985
- Doug Baird, 3B, 1917–1919
- Dave Bakenhaster, P, 1964
- Bill Baker, C, 1948–1949
- Luken Baker, 1B, 2023–2025
- Steve Baker, P, 1983
- Orson Baldwin, P, 1908
- Art Ball, 2B, 1894
- Jimmy Bannon, OF/SS/P, 1893
- Jap Barbeau, 3B, 1909–1910
- Brian Barber, P, 1995–1996
- George Barclay, OF, 1902–1904
- Brian Barden, 3B, 2007–2009
- Ray Bare, P, 1972, 1974
- Clyde Barfoot, P, 1922–1923
- Greg Bargar, P, 1986
- Sam Barkley, 2B, 1885
- Mike Barlow, P, 1975
- Frank Barnes, P, 1957–1958, 1960
- Jacob Barnes, P, 2023
- Skeeter Barnes, 3B, 1987
- Jack Barnett, OF, 1907
- Steven Baron, C, 2018
- Tres Barrera, C, 2023
- Jose Barrero, OF/2B/SS/3B, 2025
- Frank Barrett, P, 1939
- Red Barrett, P, 1945–1946
- Shad Barry, OF, 1906–1908
- Brian Barton, OF, 2008
- Dave Bartosch, OF, 1945
- Rich Batchelor, P, 1993, 1996–1997
- Frank Bates, P, 1899
- Miguel Batista, P, 2011
- Allen Battle, OF, 1995
- Ed Bauta, P, 1960–1963
- José Bautista, P, 1997
- Moose Baxter, 1B, 1907
- Johnny Beall, OF, 1918
- Ralph Beard, P, 1954
- Jim Beauchamp, 1B, 1963, 1970–1971
- Johnny Beazley, P, 1941–1942, 1946
- Zinn Beck, 3B, 1913–1916
- **Jake Beckley**, 1B, 1904–1907
- Bill Beckmann, P, 1942
- Fred Beebe, P, 1906–1909
- Clarence Beers, P, 1948
- Matt Belisle, P, 2015
- David Bell, 3B/2B, 1995–1998
- Hi Bell, P, 1924, 1926–1927, 1929–1930
- Les Bell, 3B, 1923–1927
- Ronnie Belliard, 2B, 2006
- Jack Bellman, C, 1889
- **Carlos Beltrán**, OF, 2012–2013
- Rigo Beltrán, P, 1997
- Alan Benes, P, 1995–1997, 1999–2001
- Andy Benes, P, 1996–1997, 2000–2002
- Joe Benes, SS/2B/3B, 1931
- Gary Bennett, C, 2006–2007
- Pug Bennett, 2B, 1906–1907
- Vern Benson, 3B/OF, 1951–1953
- Sid Benton, P, 1922
- Jeff Berblinger, 2B, 1997
- Augie Bergamo, OF, 1944–1945
- Lance Berkman, OF/1B, 2011–2012
- Jack Berly, P, 1924
- Leo Bernal, C/1B, 2026–present
- Joe Bernard, P, 1909
- Frank Bertaina, P, 1970
- Harry Berte, 2B/SS, 1903
- Bob Bescher, OF, 1915–1917
- Frank Betcher, SS/3B/2B/OF, 1910
- Harry Betts, P, 1903
- Bruno Betzel, 2B/3B/OF, 1914–1918
- Jim Bibby, P, 1972–1973
- Ed Biecher, OF, 1897
- Lou Bierbauer, 2B/3B/SS, 1897–1898
- Larry Bigbie, OF, 2006
- Steve Bilko, 1B, 1949–1954
- Dick Billings, C, 1974–1975
- Frank Bird, C, 1892
- Ray Blades*, OF, 1922–1928, 1930–1932
- Harry Blake, OF, 1899
- Sheriff Blake, P, 1937
- Coonie Blank, C, 1909
- Don Blasingame, 2B, 1955–1959
- Johnny Blatnik, OF, 1950
- Buddy Blattner, SS/2B, 1942
- Bob Blaylock, P, 1956, 1959
- Gary Blaylock, P, 1959
- Michael Blazek, P, 2013
- Scott Blewett, P, 2026
- Jack Bliss, C, 1908–1912
- Bud Bloomfield, 3B, 1963
- Charlie Boardman, P, 1915
- Joe Boever, P, 1985–1986
- Mitchell Boggs, P, 2008–2013
- Dick Bokelmann, P, 1951–1953
- Sam Bohne, SS, 1916
- Bill Bolden, P, 1919
- Don Bollweg, 1B, 1950–1951
- Bobby Bonds, OF, 1980
- Bobby Bonilla, 1B, 2001
- Frank Bonner, 3B/OF/C, 1895
- Rod Booker, 2B/3B/SS, 1987–1989
- Pedro Borbón, P, 1980
- Pedro Borbón Jr., P, 2003
- Frenchy Bordagaray, OF/3B, 1937–1938
- Pat Borders, C/1B, 1996
- Rick Bosetti, OF, 1977
- Ricky Bottalico, P, 1999
- Kent Bottenfield, P, 1998–1999
- **Jim Bottomley**, 1B, 1922–1932
- Peter Bourjos, OF, 2014–2015
- Bob Bowman, P, 1939–1940
- Matt Bowman, P, 2016–2018
- Blaine Boyer, P, 2009
- Cloyd Boyer, P, 1949–1952
- Ken Boyer*, 3B, 1955–1965
- Jack Boyle, C, 1887–1889, 1891
- Buddy Bradford, OF, 1975
- Terry Bradshaw, OF, 1995–1996
- Darren Bragg, OF, 1999
- Dave Brain, SS/3B, 1903–1905
- Harvey Branch, P, 1962
- Jackie Brandt, OF, 1956
- Jeff Brantley, P, 1998
- Russell Branyan, 3B/1B, 2007
- Roy Brashear, 1B, 1902
- Joe Bratcher, OF, 1924
- Steve Braun, OF, 1981–1985
- Al Brazle, P, 1943, 1946–1954
- John Brebbia, P, 2017–2019
- Harry Brecheen, P, 1940, 1943–1952
- Ted Breitenstein, P/OF, 1891–1896, 1901
- Herb Bremer, C, 1937–1939
- **Roger Bresnahan***, C, 1909–1912
- Rube Bressler, OF, 1932
- Eddie Bressoud, SS, 1967
- Rod Brewer, 1B/OF, 1990–1993
- Marshall Bridges, P, 1959–1960
- Rocky Bridges, 2B, 1960
- Grant Briggs, C/OF, 1892
- Nelson Briles, P, 1965–1970
- Ed Brinkman, SS, 1975
- John Brock, C/OF, 1917–1918
- **Lou Brock**, OF, 1964–1979
- Steve Brodie, OF/2B/3B, 1892–1893
- Ernie Broglio, P, 1959–1964
- Herman Bronkie, 3B, 1918
- Aaron Brooks, P, 2022
- Jim Brosnan, P, 1958–1959
- Tony Brottem, C/1B/OF, 1916, 1918
- Cal Broughton, C, 1885
- Andrew Brown, OF, 2011
- Buster Brown, P, 1905–1907
- Ed Brown, OF/2B/P, 1882
- Jim Brown, OF, 1915
- Jimmy Brown, 2B, 1937–1943
- **Mordecai Brown**, P, 1903
- Tom Brown, OF, 1895
- William Brown, 1B, 1894
- Byron Browne, OF, 1969
- Barret Browning, P, 2012
- Cal Browning, P, 1960
- Pete Browning, OF, 1894
- Jonathan Broxton, P, 2015–2017
- Justin Bruihl, P, 2026–present
- Glenn Brummer, C, 1981–1984
- Tom Brunansky, OF, 1988–1990
- George Brunet, P, 1971
- Justin Brunette, P, 2000
- Tom Bruno, P, 1978–1979
- Ron Bryant, P, 1975
- Johnny Bucha, C, 1948, 1950
- Jerry Buchek, SS/2B, 1961, 1963–1966
- Jim Bucher, 2B/3B, 1938
- Gary Buckels, P, 1994
- Dick Buckley, C, 1892–1894
- Fritz Buelow, C/OF, 1899–1900
- Nelson Burbrink, C, 1955
- Al Burch, OF, 1906–1907
- Bob Burda, 1B/OF, 1962, 1971
- Lew Burdette, P, 1963–1964
- Tom Burgess, OF, 1954
- Sandy Burk, P, 1912–1913
- Jimmy Burke*, 3B, 1899, 1903–1905
- Joe Burke, 3B, 1890
- Leo Burke, OF/3B, 1963
- **Jesse Burkett**, OF, 1899–1901
- Ken Burkhart, P, 1945–1948
- Alec Burleson, 1B/OF, 2022–present
- Ed Burns, C, 1912
- Farmer Burns, P, 1901
- Todd Burns, P, 1993
- Harry Burrell, P/OF, 1891
- Ray Burris, P, 1986
- Ellis Burton, OF, 1958, 1960
- Mike Busby, P, 1996–1999
- Guy Bush, P, 1938
- Doc Bushong, C, 1885–1887
- Ray Busse, SS, 1973
- Art Butler, SS, 1914–1916
- Joey Butler, OF, 2014
- John Butler, C, 1904
- Johnny Butler, 3B/SS, 1929
- Keith Butler, P, 2013–2014
- Bud Byerly, P, 1943–1945
- Bill Byers, C/1B, 1904
- Bobby Byrne, 3B, 1907–1909

== C ==
- Al Cabrera, SS, 1913
- Génesis Cabrera, P, 2019–2023
- Miguel Cairo, 2B/OF/3B, 2001–2003, 2007
- Kiko Calero, P, 2003–2004
- Jack Calhoun, 3B/1B/OF, 1902
- Carmen Cali, P, 2004–2005
- John Callahan, P, 1898
- Wese Callahan, SS, 1913
- Ernie Camacho, P, 1990
- Harry Camnitz, P, 1911
- Lew Camp, 3B, 1892
- Count Campau*, OF, 1890
- Bill Campbell, P, 1985
- Billy Campbell, P, 1905
- Dave Campbell, 2B, 1973
- Jim Campbell, PH, 1970
- Sal Campisi, P, 1969–1970
- Chris Cannizzaro, C, 1960–1961
- Ozzie Canseco, OF, 1992–1993
- Conner Capel, OF, 2022
- Doug Capilla, P, 1976–1977
- Ramón Caraballo, 2B, 1995
- Bernie Carbo, OF, 1972–1973, 1979–1980
- José Cardenal, OF, 1970–1971
- Tex Carleton, P, 1932–1934
- Dylan Carlson, OF, 2020–2024
- **Steve Carlton**, P, 1965–1971
- Duke Carmel, OF, 1959–1960, 1963
- Chris Carpenter, P, 2004–2012
- Cris Carpenter, P, 1988–1992
- Hick Carpenter, 3B, 1892
- Matt Carpenter, 3B/1B, 2011–2021, 2024
- Chuck Carr, OF, 1992
- Clay Carroll, P, 1977
- Cliff Carroll, OF, 1892
- Kid Carsey, P, 1897–1898
- Ed Cartwright, 1B, 1890
- Bob Caruthers*, OF/P, 1884–1887, 1892
- Pete Castiglione, 3B, 1953–1954
- Alberto Castillo, C, 1999
- Troy Cate, P, 2007
- Danny Cater, 1B, 1975
- Ted Cather, OF, 1912–1914
- Andy Cavazos, P, 2007
- Brett Cecil, P, 2017–2018
- César Cedeño, 1B/OF, 1985
- Roger Cedeño, OF, 2004–2005
- **Orlando Cepeda**, 1B, 1966–1968
- Ice Box Chamberlain, P, 1888–1890
- Adron Chambers, OF, 2011–2013
- Bill Chambers, P, 1910
- Cliff Chambers, P, 1951–1953
- Johnnie Chambers, P, 1937
- Charlie Chant, OF, 1976
- Chappy Charles, 2B/SS, 1908–1909
- Tom Cheney, P, 1957, 1959
- Cupid Childs, 2B, 1899
- Pete Childs, 2B/OF/SS, 1901
- Nelson Chittum, P, 1958
- Bob Chlupsa, P, 1970–1971
- Randy Choate, P, 2013–2015
- Jason Christiansen, P, 2000–2001
- Nathan Church, OF, 2025–present
- Larry Ciaffone, OF, 1951
- Al Cicotte, P, 1961
- Gino Cimoli, OF, 1959
- Frank Cimorelli, P, 1994
- Steve Cishek, P, 2015
- Ralph Citarella, P, 1983–1984
- Stubby Clapp, 2B/OF, 2001
- Doug Clarey, 2B, 1976
- Danny Clark, OF, 1927
- Jack Clark, 1B, 1985–1987
- Jim Clark, OF, 1911–1912
- Mark Clark, P, 1991–1992
- Mike Clark, P, 1952–1953
- Phil Clark, P, 1958–1959
- Will Clark, 1B, 2000
- Josh Clarke, OF/2B/SS, 1905
- Stan Clarke, P, 1990
- Dad Clarkson, P, 1893–1895
- Royce Clayton, SS, 1996–1998
- Doug Clemens, OF, 1960–1964
- Jack Clements, C, 1898
- Lance Clemons, P, 1972
- Verne Clemons, C, 1919–1924
- Donn Clendenon, 1B, 1972
- Maikel Cleto, P, 2011–2013
- Reggie Cleveland, P, 1969–1973
- Tony Cloninger, P, 1972
- Ed Clough, OF/P, 1924–1926
- Dick Cole, 2B, 1951
- Percy Coleman, P, 1897
- Vince Coleman, OF, 1985–1990
- Walter Coleman, P, 1895
- Darnell Coles, 3B/1B/OF, 1995
- Bill Collins, OF, 1892
- Dave Collins, 1B, 1990
- Phil Collins, P, 1935
- Ripper Collins, 1B, 1931–1936
- Jackie Collum, P, 1951–1953, 1956
- Bob Coluccio, OF, 1978
- **Charles Comiskey***, 1B, 1882–1889, 1891
- Joe Connor, 3B, 1895
- **Roger Connor***, 1B, 1894–1897
- Tim Conroy, P, 1986–1987
- Willson Contreras, C/1B, 2023–2025
- Ed Conwell, 3B, 1911
- Paul Cook, C, 1891
- Mike Coolbaugh, 3B, 2002
- Scott Coolbaugh, 1B/3B, 1994
- Duff Cooley, OF, 1893–1896
- Jimmy Cooney, SS, 1924–1925
- Tim Cooney, P, 2015
- Mort Cooper, P, 1938–1945
- Scott Cooper, 3B, 1995
- Walker Cooper, C, 1940–1945, 1956–1957
- Mays Copeland, P, 1935
- Joe Corbett, P, 1904
- Roy Corhan, SS, 1916
- Rhéal Cormier, P, 1991–1994
- Pat Corrales, C, 1966
- Frank Corridon, P, 1910
- Jim Cosman, P, 1966–1967
- John Costello, P, 1988–1990
- Chip Coulter, 2B, 1969
- Jack Coveney, C, 1903
- Bill Cox, P, 1936
- Danny Cox, P, 1983–1988
- Estel Crabtree, OF, 1933, 1941–1942
- Allen Craig, OF/1B, 2010–2014
- Roger Craig, P, 1964
- Doc Crandall, PH, 1913
- Brandon Crawford, SS, 2024
- Forrest Crawford, SS, 1906–1907
- Glenn Crawford, OF, 1945
- Pat Crawford, 1B/2B/3B, 1933–1934
- Willie Crawford, OF, 1976
- Doug Creek, P, 1995
- Jack Creel, P, 1945
- Gus Creely, SS, 1890
- Bernie Creger, SS, 1947
- Creepy Crespi, 2B, 1938–1942
- Lou Criger, C, 1899–1900
- Jack Crimian, P, 1951–1952
- Nabil Crismatt, P, 2020
- Morrie Critchley, P, 1882
- Tripp Cromer, SS, 1993–1995
- Jack Crooks*, 2B/3B, 1892–1893, 1898
- Jimmy Crooks, C, 2025–present
- Ed Crosby, SS/2B, 1970, 1972–1973
- Jeff Cross, SS, 1942, 1946–1948
- Lave Cross, 3B, 1898–1900
- Monte Cross, SS, 1896–1897
- Joe Crotty, C/OF, 1882
- Bill Crouch, P, 1941, 1945
- Rich Croushore, P, 1998–1999
- George Crowe, 1B, 1959–1961
- Mike Crudale, P, 2002–2003
- Walton Cruise, OF, 1914, 1916–1919
- Gene Crumling, C, 1945
- Héctor Cruz, 3B/OF, 1973, 1975–1977
- Iván Cruz, 1B, 2002
- Jesús Cruz, P, 2020
- José Cruz, OF, 1970–1974
- Tommy Cruz, OF, 1973
- Tony Cruz, C, 2011–2015
- Mike Cuellar, P, 1964
- George Culver, P, 1970
- John Cumberland, P, 1972
- Joe Cunningham, OF, 1954, 1956–1961
- Ray Cunningham, 3B/2B, 1931–1932
- George Cuppy, P, 1899
- Clarence Currie, P, 1902–1903
- Murphy Currie, P, 1916
- Jermaine Curtis, OF, 2013
- John Curtis, P, 1974–1976
- Ned Cuthbert*, OF, 1882–1883

== D ==
- John D'Acquisto, P, 1977
- Gene Dale, P, 1911–1912
- Jack Damaska, 2B/OF, 1963
- Pete Daniels, P, 1898
- Rolla Daringer, SS, 1914–1915
- Alvin Dark, SS, 1956–1958
- Dell Darling, C/2B/SS, 1891
- Vic Davalillo, OF, 1969–1970
- Jerry DaVanon, SS, 1969–1970, 1974, 1977
- Curt Davis, P, 1938–1940
- Daisy Davis, P/OF, 1884
- Eric Davis, OF, 1999–2000
- Jim Davis, P, 1957
- Jumbo Davis, 3B/OF/SS, 1889–1890
- Kiddo Davis, OF, 1934
- Ron Davis, OF, 1968
- Spud Davis, C, 1928, 1934–1936
- Willie Davis, OF, 1975
- Bill Dawley, P, 1987
- Boots Day, OF, 1969
- Pea Ridge Day, P, 1924–1925
- Ken Dayley, P, 1984–1990
- Cot Deal, P, 1950, 1954
- Austin Dean, OF/1B, 2020–2021
- **Dizzy Dean**, P, 1930, 1932–1937
- Paul Dean, P, 1934–1939
- Pat Deasley, C, 1883–1884
- Doug DeCinces, 3B, 1987
- Frank Decker, 2B, 1882
- George Decker, 1B, 1898
- Tony DeFate, 3B/2B, 1917
- Rube DeGroff, OF, 1905–1906
- Mike DeJean, P, 2003
- Iván DeJesús, 3B/SS, 1985
- Paul DeJong, SS, 2017–2023
- Bobby Del Greco, OF, 1956
- Joe Delahanty, OF/2B, 1907–1909
- Bill DeLancey, C, 1932, 1934–1935, 1940
- Art Delaney, P, 1924
- José DeLeón, P, 1988–1992
- Luis DeLeón, P, 1981
- Wilson Delgado, SS/2B/3B, 2002–2003
- Eddie Delker, 2B/SS/3B, 1929, 1931–1932
- Wheezer Dell, P, 1912
- Rich DeLucia, P, 1995
- Ben DeLuzio, OF, 2022
- Frank Demaree, OF, 1943
- Lee DeMontreville, SS/2B/OF, 1903
- Don Dennis, P, 1965–1966
- John Denny, P, 1974–1979
- Mark DeRosa, 3B, 2009
- Paul Derringer, P, 1931–1933
- Russ Derry, PH, 1949
- Joe DeSa, 1B/OF, 1980
- Daniel Descalso, 3B/2B/SS, 2010–2014
- Delino DeShields, 2B, 1997–1998
- Jim Devlin, P, 1888–1889
- Aledmys Díaz, SS, 2016–2017
- Einar Díaz, C, 2005
- Leo Dickerman, P, 1924–1925
- Corey Dickerson, OF, 2022
- Brandon Dickson, P, 2011–2012, 2021
- Murry Dickson, P, 1939–1940, 1942–1943, 1946–1948, 1956–1957
- Chuck Diering, OF, 1947–1951
- Larry Dierker, P, 1977
- Mike DiFelice, C, 1996–1997, 2002
- Pat Dillard, OF/3B/SS, 1900
- Pickles Dillhoefer, C, 1919–1921
- Mike Dimmel, OF, 1979
- Frank DiPino, P, 1989–1990, 1992
- Dutch Distel, 2B/SS/OF, 1918
- Steve Dixon, P, 1993–1994
- Bill Doak, P, 1913–1924, 1929
- Hunter Dobbins, P, 2026–present
- George Dockins, P, 1945
- Cozy Dolan, OF, 1914–1915
- John Dolan, P, 1893
- Tom Dolan, C/OF, 1883–1884, 1888
- Red Donahue, P, 1895–1897
- She Donahue, 2B/SS, 1904
- Mike Donlin, OF/1B, 1899–1900
- Blix Donnelly, P, 1944–1946
- Jim Donnelly, 3B, 1890, 1898
- Brendan Donovan, 2B/OF/3B/1B, 2022–2025
- Patsy Donovan*, OF, 1900–1903
- Bert Dorr, P, 1882
- Octavio Dotel, P, 2011
- Klondike Douglass, OF/C, 1896–1897
- Taylor Douthit, OF, 1923–1931
- Dennis Dove, P, 2007
- Tommy Dowd*, OF, 1893–1898
- Dave Dowling, P, 1964
- Carl Doyle, P, 1940
- Jeff Doyle, 2B, 1983
- John Doyle, P, 1882
- Moe Drabowsky, P, 1971–1972
- Lee Dressen, 1B, 1914
- Rob Dressler, P, 1978
- J. D. Drew, OF, 1998–2003
- Dan Driessen, 1B, 1987
- Mike Drissel, C, 1885
- Carl Druhot, P, 1906–1907
- Matt Duff, P, 2002
- Charlie Duffee, OF/3B, 1889–1890
- Zach Duke, P, 2016–2017
- Bob Duliba, P, 1959–1960, 1962
- Chris Duncan, OF/1B, 2005–2009
- Taylor Duncan, 3B, 1977
- Wiley Dunham, P, 1902
- Grant Dunlap, OF, 1953
- Jack Dunleavy, OF, 1903–1905
- Shawon Dunston, OF, 1999–2000
- Don Durham, P, 1972
- Joe Durham, OF, 1959
- Leon Durham, OF, 1980, 1989
- **Leo Durocher**, SS, 1933–1937
- Jesse Duryea, P, 1891
- Erv Dusak, OF/2B, 1941–1942, 1946–1951
- Frank Dwyer, P, 1892
- Jim Dwyer, OF, 1973–1975, 1977–1978
- Eddie Dyer*, P, 1922–1927

== E ==
- Bill Eagan, 2B, 1891
- Billy Earle, C/OF/2B/3B/SS, 1890
- Bill Earley, P, 1986
- George Earnshaw, P, 1936
- Ed Easley, C, 2015
- Jack Easton, P/OF, 1891–1892
- Rawly Eastwick, P, 1977
- Johnny Echols, PR, 1939
- **Dennis Eckersley**, P, 1996–1997
- Al Eckert, P, 1935
- David Eckstein, SS, 2005–2007
- Joe Edelen, P, 1981
- Tommy Edman, 2B/SS/OF/3B, 2019–2023
- Jim Edmonds, OF, 2000–2007
- Johnny Edwards, C, 1968
- Wish Egan, P, 1905–1906
- Red Ehret, P, 1895
- Cal Eldred, P, 2003–2005
- Seth Elledge, P, 2020–2021
- Harry Elliott, OF, 1953, 1955
- Jim Ellis, P, 1969
- Mark Ellis, 2B, 2014
- Rube Ellis, OF, 1909–1912
- Bones Ely, SS, 1893–1895
- Juan Encarnación, OF, 2006–2007
- Bill Endicott, OF, 1946
- Del Ennis, OF, 1957–1958
- Charlie Enwright, SS, 1909
- Hal Epps, OF, 1938, 1940
- Eddie Erautt, P, 1953
- Duke Esper, P, 1897–1898
- Brian Esposito, C, 2007
- Chuck Essegian, OF, 1959
- Roy Evans, P, 1897
- Steve Evans, OF, 1909–1913
- Bryan Eversgerd, P, 1994, 1998
- Bob Ewing, P, 1912
- John Ewing, OF, 1883
- Reuben Ewing, SS, 1921

== F ==
- Joe Fagin, C, 1895
- Ron Fairly, 1B, 1975–1976
- Pete Falcone, P, 1976–1978
- Brian Falkenborg, P, 2006–2007
- George Fallon, 2B/SS, 1943–1945
- Harry Fanok, P, 1963–1964
- Doc Farrell, SS/2B/1B, 1930
- John Farrell, 2B, 1902–1905
- Jeff Fassero, P, 2002–2003
- Jack Faszholz, P, 1953
- Erick Fedde, P, 2024–2025
- Pedro Feliz, 3B, 2010
- Bobby Fenwick, 2B, 1973
- Caleb Ferguson, P, 2026
- Joe Ferguson, C, 1976
- José Fermín, OF/3B/2B, 2023–present
- Junior Fernández, P, 2019–2022
- Ryan Fernandez, P, 2024–present
- Don Ferrarese, P, 1962
- Neil Fiala, PH, 1981
- C. J. Fick, P, 2012
- Bien Figueroa, SS/2B, 1992
- Chuck Finley, P, 2002
- Mike Fiore, 1B/OF, 1972
- Sam Fishburn, 1B/2B, 1919
- Bob Fisher, 2B, 1918–1919
- Chauncey Fisher, P, 1901
- Eddie Fisher, P, 1973
- Showboat Fisher, OF, 1930
- Mike Fitzgerald, 1B, 1988
- Max Flack, OF, 1922–1925
- Jack Flaherty, P, 2017–2023
- Tom Flanigan, P, 1958
- Curt Flood, OF, 1958–1969
- Tim Flood, 2B, 1899
- Bernardo Flores, P, 2021
- Randy Flores, P, 2004–2008
- Ben Flowers, P, 1955–1956
- Jake Flowers, 3B/SS/2B, 1923, 1926, 1931–1932
- Rich Folkers, P, 1972–1974
- Curt Ford, OF, 1985–1988
- Hod Ford, SS, 1932
- Eric Fornataro, P, 2014
- Bob Forsch, P, 1974–1988
- Tony Fossas, P, 1995–1997
- Alan Foster, P, 1973–1974
- Jack Fournier, 1B, 1920–1922
- Dave Foutz, P/OF/1B, 1884–1887
- Dexter Fowler, OF, 2017–2020
- Jesse Fowler, P, 1924
- Earl Francis, P, 1965
- Tito Francona, 1B/OF, 1965–1966
- Charlie Frank, OF, 1893–1894
- Fred Frankhouse, P, 1927–1930
- Micah Franklin, OF, 1997
- Ryan Franklin, P, 2007–2011
- Herman Franks, C, 1939
- John Frascatore, P, 1994–1995, 1997–1998
- Willie Fraser, P, 1991
- George Frazier, P, 1978–1980
- Joe Frazier, OF/1B, 1954–1956
- Roger Freed, 1B, 1977–1979
- Julie Freeman, P, 1888
- Sam Freeman, P, 2012–2014
- David Freese, 3B, 2009–2013
- Gene Freese, SS/2B/3B, 1958
- Howard Freigau, 3B/SS, 1922–1925
- Benny Frey, P, 1932
- **Frankie Frisch***, 2B, 1927–1937
- Danny Frisella, P, 1976
- Art Fromme, P, 1906–1908
- Eric Fryer, C, 2016–2017
- Brian Fuentes, P, 2012
- John Fulgham, P, 1979–1980
- Harry Fuller, 3B, 1891
- Shorty Fuller, SS, 1889–1891
- Chick Fullis, OF, 1934, 1936
- Chick Fulmer, 2B, 1884
- Rafael Furcal, SS, 2011–2012
- Eddie Fusselback, C/OF/P, 1882
- Les Fusselman, C, 1952–1953

== G ==
- Gary Gaetti, 3B, 1996–1998
- Phil Gagliano, 2B/3B/OF, 1963–1970
- Del Gainer, 1B/OF, 1922
- Fred Gaiser, P, 1908
- Andrés Galarraga, 1B, 1992
- John Gall, OF/1B, 2005–2006
- Mike Gallego, 2B, 1996–1997
- Giovanny Gallegos, P, 2018–2024
- Jim Galloway, 2B/SS, 1912
- **Pud Galvin**, P, 1892
- Joe Gannon, P, 1898
- John Gant, P, 2017–2021
- Ron Gant, OF, 1996–1998
- Joe Garagiola, C, 1946–1951
- Adolis García, OF, 2018
- Greg Garcia, 2B/3B/SS, 2014–2018
- Jaime García, P, 2008, 2010–2016
- Luis García, P, 2021
- Danny Gardella, PH, 1950
- Glenn Gardner, P, 1945
- Art Garibaldi, 3B, 1936
- Mike Garman, P, 1974–1975
- Debs Garms, OF/3B, 1943–1945
- Wayne Garrett, 3B, 1978
- John Gast, P, 2013
- Luis Gastélum, P, 2026–present
- Rich Gedman, C, 1991–1992
- Charlie Gelbert, SS, 1929–1932, 1935–1936
- Frank Genins, SS/OF, 1892
- Joe Gerhardt*, 2B/3B, 1890
- Al Gettel, P, 1955
- Tom Gettinger, OF, 1889–1890
- Pretzels Getzien, P, 1892
- Rube Geyer, P, 1910–1913
- Ray Giannelli, 1B/OF, 1995
- **Bob Gibson**, P, 1959–1975
- Kyle Gibson, P, 2024
- Billy Gilbert, 2B, 1908–1909
- Shawn Gilbert, 2B, 1998
- George Gilham, C, 1920–1921
- Frank Gilhooley, OF, 1911–1912
- Bernard Gilkey, OF, 1990–1995
- Jim Gill, 2B/OF, 1889
- Carden Gillenwater, OF, 1940
- George Gillpatrick, P, 1898
- Hal Gilson, P, 1968
- Joe Girardi, C, 2003
- Dave Giusti, P, 1969
- Jack Glasscock*, SS, 1892–1893
- Troy Glaus, 3B, 2008–2009
- Tommy Glaviano, 3B, 1949–1952
- Bill Gleason, SS, 1882–1887
- Jack Gleason, 3B, 1882–1883
- Kid Gleason, P, 1892–1894
- Bob Glenn, P, 1920
- Harry Glenn, C, 1915
- John Glenn, OF, 1960
- Danny Godby, OF, 1974
- Roy Golden, P, 1910–1911
- Walt Goldsby, OF, 1884
- Paul Goldschmidt, 1B, 2019–2024
- Hal Goldsmith, P, 1929
- Austin Gomber, P, 2018, 2020
- Marco Gonzales, P, 2014–2015, 2017
- Julio González, 3B/2B/SS, 1981–1982
- Mike González*, C, 1915–1918, 1924–1925, 1931–1932
- Bill Goodenough, OF, 1893
- Mike Goodfellow, C, 1887
- Marv Goodwin, P, 1917, 1919–1922
- George Gore*, OF, 1892
- Herb Gorman, PH, 1952
- Jack Gorman, OF, 1883
- Nolan Gorman, 2B/3B, 2022–present
- Hank Gornicki, P, 1941
- Julio Gotay, SS, 1960–1962
- Al Grabowski, P, 1929–1930
- Gordon Graceffo, P, 2024–present
- Mike Grady, C/1B, 1897, 1904–1906
- Alex Grammas, SS, 1954–1956, 1959–1962
- Wayne Granger, P, 1968, 1973
- Andre Granillo, P, 2025
- Mudcat Grant, P, 1969
- Mark Grater, P, 1991
- Dick Gray, SS/3B/2B/OF, 1959–1960
- Sonny Gray, P, 2024–2025
- Bill Greason, P, 1954
- David Green, OF/1B, 1981–1984, 1987
- Gene Green, OF/C, 1957–1959
- Scarborough Green, OF, 1997
- Khalil Greene, SS, 2009
- Tyler Greene, 2B/SS, 2009–2012
- Nick Greenwood, P, 2014–2015
- Luke Gregerson, P, 2018–2019
- Bill Greif, P, 1976
- Randal Grichuk, OF, 2014–2017
- Tim Griesenbeck, C, 1920
- Tom Grieve, OF, 1979
- Sandy Griffin, OF, 1893
- **Clark Griffith**, P, 1891
- Bob Grim, P, 1960
- **Burleigh Grimes**, P, 1930–1931, 1933–1934
- John Grimes, P, 1897
- Charlie Grimm, 1B, 1918
- Dan Griner, P, 1912–1916
- Marv Grissom, P, 1959
- Dick Groat, SS, 1963–1965
- Johnny Grodzicki, P, 1941, 1946–1947
- Mark Grudzielanek, 2B, 2005
- Joe Grzenda, P, 1972
- Mario Guerrero, SS, 1975
- Pedro Guerrero, 1B, 1988–1992
- Lee Guetterman, P, 1993
- Preston Guilmet, P, 2018
- Mike Gulan, 3B, 1997
- Harry Gumbert, P, 1941–1944
- Joe Gunson, C, 1893
- Don Gutteridge, 3B, 1936–1940
- Santiago Guzmán, P, 1969–1972
- Jedd Gyorko, 3B/2B/SS, 2016–2019

== H ==
- Bob Habenicht, P, 1951
- John Habyan, P, 1994–1995
- Jim Hackett, 1B, 1902–1903
- Luther Hackman, P, 2000–2002
- Harvey Haddix, P, 1952–1956
- **Chick Hafey**, OF, 1924–1931
- Casey Hageman, P, 1914
- Kevin Hagen, P, 1983–1984
- Joe Hague, 1B/OF, 1968–1972
- Don Hahn, OF, 1975
- Fred Hahn, P, 1952
- Hal Haid, P, 1928–1930
- Ed Haigh, OF, 1892
- **Jesse Haines**, P, 1920–1937
- Charley Hall, P, 1916
- Russ Hall, SS, 1898
- Bill Hallahan, P, 1925–1926, 1929–1936
- Bill Hallman*, 2B, 1897
- Dave Hamilton, P, 1978
- Mark Hamilton, 1B/OF, 2010–2011
- Garrett Hampson, OF/SS/2B/3B/P, 2025
- Josh Hancock, P, 2006–2007
- Fred Haney, 3B, 1929
- Larry Haney, C, 1973
- J. A. Happ, P, 2021
- Dan Haren, P, 2003–2004
- Dick Harley, OF, 1897–1898
- Bob Harmon, P, 1909–1913
- Chuck Harmon, OF/1B/3B, 1956–1957
- Brian Harper, OF/3B/C/1B, 1985
- George Harper, OF, 1928
- Jack Harper, P, 1900–1901
- Ray Harrell, P, 1935, 1937–1938
- Mitch Harris, P, 2015
- Vic Harris, 2B/OF, 1976
- Bill Hart, P, 1896–1897
- Billy Hart, P/OF, 1890
- Bo Hart, 2B, 2003–2004
- Chuck Hartenstein, P, 1970
- Jumbo Harting, C, 1886
- Fred Hartman, 3B, 1897, 1902
- Pat Hartnett, 1B, 1890
- Andy Hassler, P, 1984–1985
- Marcus Hatley, P, 2015
- Grady Hatton, 2B/3B, 1956
- Arnold Hauser, SS, 1910–1913
- Bill Hawke, P/OF, 1892–1893
- Blake Hawksworth, P, 2009–2010
- Pink Hawley, P, 1892–1894
- Jeremy Hazelbaker, OF, 2016
- Doc Hazelton, 1B, 1902
- Francis Healy, C/3B/OF, 1934
- Bunny Hearn, P, 1910–1911
- Jim Hearn, P, 1947–1950
- Mike Heath, C, 1986
- Cliff Heathcote, OF, 1918–1922
- Jack Heidemann, SS, 1974
- Emmet Heidrick, OF, 1899–1901
- Don Heinkel, P, 1989
- Tom Heintzelman, 2B, 1973–1974
- Bob Heise, 2B, 1974
- Clarence Heise, P, 1934
- Rick Heiserman, P, 1999
- Ryan Helsley, P, 2019–2025
- Scott Hemond, C, 1995
- Charlie Hemphill, OF, 1899
- Solly Hemus*, SS, 1949–1956, 1959
- George Hendrick, OF, 1978–1984
- Harvey Hendrick, 3B/OF, 1932
- Tom Henke, P, 1995
- Roy Henshaw, P, 1938
- Pat Hentgen, P, 2000
- Dustin Hermanson, P, 2001, 2003
- Carlos Hernández, C, 2000
- Keith Hernandez, 1B, 1974–1983
- Larry Herndon, OF, 1974
- Ed Herr, SS/OF/2B/3B, 1888, 1890
- Tom Herr, 2B, 1979–1988
- Iván Herrera, C, 2022–present
- Neal Hertweck, 1B, 1952
- Ed Heusser, P, 1935–1936
- Mike Heydon, C/OF, 1901
- Jason Heyward, OF, 2015
- Jim Hickman, 1B/3B, 1974
- Jim Hicks, OF, 1969
- Jordan Hicks, P, 2018–2019, 2021–2023
- Irv Higginbotham, P, 1906, 1908–1909
- Bill Higgins, 2B, 1890
- Dennis Higgins, P, 1971–1972
- Eddie Higgins, P/OF, 1909–1910
- Andy High, 3B/2B, 1928–1931
- Palmer Hildebrand, C/OF, 1913
- Tom Hilgendorf, P, 1969–1970
- Carmen Hill, P, 1929–1930
- Hugh Hill, OF, 1904
- Ken Hill, P, 1988–1991, 1995
- Marc Hill, C, 1973–1974
- Steven Hill, 1B/C, 2010, 2012
- Howard Hilton, P, 1990
- Jack Himes, OF, 1905–1906
- Sterling Hitchcock, P, 2003
- Bruce Hitt, P, 1917
- Cooper Hjerpe, P, 2026–present
- Glen Hobbie, P, 1964
- Ed Hock, OF, 1920
- Charlie Hodnett, P/OF, 1883
- Art Hoelskoetter, 2B/3B/C, 1905–1908
- Joe Hoerner, P, 1966–1969
- Jarrett Hoffpauir, 2B/3B, 2009
- Bob Hogan, P, 1882
- Marty Hogan, OF, 1894–1895
- Aaron Holbert, 2B, 1996
- Greg Holland, P, 2018
- Mul Holland, P, 1929
- Matt Holliday, OF, 2009–2016
- Ed Holly, SS, 1906–1907
- Wattie Holm, OF/3B, 1924–1929, 1932
- Darren Holmes, P, 2000
- Ducky Holmes, OF, 1898
- Ducky Holmes, C, 1906
- Rick Honeycutt, P, 1996–1997
- Don Hood, P, 1980
- Buck Hopkins, OF, 1907
- Johnny Hopp, OF, 1939–1945
- Bill Hopper, P, 1913–1914
- Bob Horner, 1B, 1988
- **Rogers Hornsby***, 2B/SS, 1915–1926, 1933
- Oscar Horstmann, P, 1917–1919
- Ricky Horton, P, 1984–1987, 1989–1990
- Paul Householder, OF, 1984
- John Houseman, 2B/OF, 1897
- David Howard, SS/2B/3B/1B/OF, 1998–1999
- Doug Howard, 1B, 1975
- Earl Howard, P, 1918
- Thomas Howard, OF, 1999–2000
- Art Howe, 3B, 1984–1985
- Roland Howell, P, 1912
- Bill Howerton, OF, 1949–1951
- Dummy Hoy, OF, 1891
- Al Hrabosky, P, 1970–1977
- Jimmy Hudgens, 1B/2B, 1923
- Rex Hudler, OF/2B, 1990–1992
- Charlie Hudson, P, 1972
- Dakota Hudson, P, 2018–2023
- Joe Hudson, C, 2019
- Nat Hudson, P/OF, 1886–1889
- Frank Huelsman, OF, 1897
- Chad Huffman, OF, 2017
- **Miller Huggins***, 2B, 1910–1916
- Dick Hughes, P, 1966–1968
- Terry Hughes, 3B/1B, 1973
- Tom Hughes, P, 1959
- Jim Hughey, P, 1898, 1900
- Tim Hulett, 2B/SS, 1995
- Rudy Hulswitt, SS, 1909–1910
- Bob Humphreys, P, 1963–1964
- Ben Hunt, P, 1913
- Joel Hunt, OF, 1931–1932
- Randy Hunt, C, 1985
- Ron Hunt, 2B, 1974
- Brian Hunter, OF/1B, 1998
- Herb Hunter, 1B, 1921
- Steve Huntz, SS, 1967, 1969
- Walt Huntzinger, P, 1926
- Clint Hurdle, 1B, 1986
- Scott Hurst, OF, 2021
- Chad Hutchinson, P, 2001
- Ira Hutchinson, P, 1940–1941
- Bill Hutchison, P, 1897
- Ham Hyatt, 1B, 1915
- Pat Hynes, P, 1903

== I ==
- Dane Iorg, OF/1B, 1977–1984
- Walt Irwin, PH, 1921
- Jason Isringhausen, P, 2002–2008
- César Izturis, SS, 2008

== J ==
- Ray Jablonski, 3B, 1953–1954, 1959
- Al Jackson, P, 1966–1967
- Danny Jackson, P, 1995–1997
- Edwin Jackson, P, 2011
- Larry Jackson, P, 1955–1962
- Mike Jackson, P, 1971
- Ryan Jackson, 2B/3B/SS, 2012–2013
- Elmer Jacobs, P, 1919–1920
- Tony Jacobs, P, 1955
- Bert James, OF, 1909
- Charlie James, OF, 1960–1964
- Mike James, P, 2000–2001
- Hal Janvrin, 1B, 1919–1921
- Kevin Jarvis, P, 2005
- Hi Jasper, P, 1916
- Larry Jaster, P, 1965–1968
- Julián Javier, 2B, 1960–1971
- Jon Jay, OF, 2010–2015
- Hal Jeffcoat, P, 1959
- Gregg Jefferies, 1B, 1993–1994
- Marcus Jensen, C, 1999
- José Jiménez, P, 1998–1999
- Kelvin Jiménez, P, 2007–2008
- Alex Johnson, OF, 1966–1967
- Billy Johnson, 3B, 1951–1953
- Bob Johnson, 3B/1B, 1969
- Dan Johnson, 1B, 2015
- Darrell Johnson, C, 1960
- Jerry Johnson, P, 1970
- Ken Johnson, P, 1947–1950
- Lance Johnson, OF, 1987
- Mark Johnson, C, 2008
- Rankin Johnson Sr., P, 1918
- Rob Johnson, C/P, 2013
- Si Johnson, P, 1936–1938
- Syl Johnson, P, 1926–1933
- Tyler Johnson, P, 2005–2007
- Cowboy Jones, P, 1899–1901
- Gordon Jones, P, 1954–1956
- Howie Jones, OF, 1921
- Nippy Jones, 1B, 1946–1951
- Red Jones, OF, 1940
- Sam Jones, P, 1957–1958, 1963
- Tim Jones, SS/2B, 1988–1993
- Bubber Jonnard, C, 1929
- Blaze Jordan, 3B, 2026–present
- Brian Jordan, OF, 1992–1998
- Mike Jorgensen*, 1B, 1984–1985
- Félix José, OF, 1990–1992
- Kevin Joseph, P, 2002
- Jimmy Journell, P, 2003, 2005
- Lyle Judy, 2B, 1935
- Al Jurisich, P, 1944–1945
- Skip Jutze, C, 1972

== K ==
- **Jim Kaat**, P, 1980–1983
- Rob Kaminsky, P, 2020
- Jerry Kane, 1B/C, 1890
- Ed Karger, P, 1906–1908
- Jason Karnuth, P, 2001
- Eddie Kasko, 3B/SS, 1957–1958
- Ray Katt, C, 1956, 1958–1959
- Tony Kaufmann, P/OF, 1927–1928, 1930–1931, 1935
- Marty Kavanagh, OF/2B, 1918
- Eddie Kazak, 3B, 1948–1952
- Bob Keely, C, 1944–1945
- Vic Keen, P, 1926–1927
- Jeff Keener, P, 1982–1983
- Randy Keisler, P, 2007
- Bill Keister, 2B, 1900
- John Kelleher, 3B, 1912
- Mick Kelleher, SS, 1972–1973, 1975
- Alex Kellner, P, 1959
- Win Kellum, P, 1905
- Billy Kelly, C, 1910
- Carson Kelly, C, 2016–2018
- Joe Kelly, P, 2012–2014
- John Kelly, OF, 1907
- Pat Kelly, 2B, 1998
- Rudy Kemmler, C, 1886
- Adam Kennedy, 2B, 1999, 2007–2008
- Jim Kennedy, SS/2B, 1970
- Terry Kennedy, C, 1978–1980
- Matt Keough, P, 1985
- Kurt Kepshire, P, 1984–1986
- John Kerins*, 1B/C, 1890
- George Kernek, 1B, 1965–1966
- Don Kessinger, SS/2B, 1976–1977
- Dean Kiekhefer, P, 2016
- Darryl Kile, P, 2000–2002
- Paul Kilgus, P, 1993
- Kwang-hyun Kim, P, 2020–2021
- Newt Kimball, P, 1940
- Hal Kime, P, 1920
- Wally Kimmick, SS, 1919
- Ellis Kinder, P, 1956
- Chick King, OF, 1959
- Curtis King, P, 1997–1999
- Jim King, OF, 1957
- John King, P, 2023–2025
- Lynn King, OF, 1935–1936, 1939
- Ray King, P, 2004–2005
- Silver King, P, 1887–1889
- Billy Kinloch, 3B, 1895
- Josh Kinney, P, 2006, 2008–2009
- Tom Kinslow, C, 1898
- Matt Kinzer, P, 1989
- Walt Kinzie, 2B, 1884
- Mike Kircher, P, 1920–1921
- Bill Kissinger, P, 1895–1897
- Andrew Kittredge, P, 2024
- Lou Klein, 2B/SS, 1943, 1945–1946, 1949
- Nubs Kleinke, P, 1935, 1937
- Ron Kline, P, 1960
- Steve Kline, P, 2001–2004
- Rudy Kling, SS, 1902
- Adam Kloffenstein, P, 2024
- Billy Klusman, 2B, 1890
- Clyde Kluttz, C, 1946
- Alan Knicely, 1B/C, 1986
- Jack Knight, P, 1922
- Andrew Knizner, C, 2019–2023
- Mike Knode, OF/2B/3B/SS, 1920
- Ed Knouff, P/OF, 1887–1888
- Darold Knowles, P, 1979–1980
- Will Koenigsmark, P, 1919
- Gary Kolb, OF, 1960, 1962–1963
- Erik Komatsu, OF, 2012
- Ed Konetchy, 1B, 1907–1913
- Jim Konstanty, P, 1956
- George Kopshaw, C, 1923
- George Kottaras, C, 2014
- Ernie Koy, OF, 1940–1941
- Pete Kozma, SS/2B, 2011–2015
- Lew Krausse Jr., P, 1973
- Charlie Krehmeyer, OF/C/1B, 1884
- Kurt Krieger, P, 1949, 1951
- Howie Krist, P, 1937–1938, 1941–1943, 1946
- Otto Krueger, 3B/SS, 1900–1902
- Ted Kubiak, SS/2B, 1971
- Bill Kuehne, 3B/SS, 1892
- Ryan Kurosaki, P, 1975
- Whitey Kurowski, 3B, 1941–1949
- Bob Kuzava, P, 1957

== L ==
- John Lackey, P, 2014–2015
- Mike Laga, 1B, 1986–1988
- Lerrin LaGrow, P, 1976
- Jeff Lahti, P, 1982–1986
- Gerald Laird, C, 2011
- Eddie Lake, SS/2B/3B, 1939–1941
- Steve Lake, C, 1986–1988
- Dan Lally, OF, 1897
- Jack Lamabe, P, 1967
- Fred Lamlein, P, 1915
- Tom Lampkin, C, 1997–1998
- Les Lancaster, P, 1993
- Hobie Landrith, C, 1957–1958
- Don Landrum, OF, 1960–1962
- Tito Landrum, OF, 1980–1987
- Don Lang, 3B, 1948
- Max Lanier, P, 1938–1946, 1949–1951
- Ray Lankford, OF, 1990–2001, 2004
- Paul LaPalme, P, 1955–1956
- Dave LaPoint, P, 1981–1984, 1987
- Ralph LaPointe, 2B, 1948
- Bob Larmore, SS, 1918
- Jason LaRue, C, 2008–2010
- Lyn Lary, SS, 1939
- Don Lassetter, OF, 1957
- Arlie Latham*, 3B, 1883–1889, 1896
- Mike LaValliere, C, 1985–1986
- Doc Lavan, SS, 1919–1924
- Johnny Lavin, OF, 1884
- Tom Lawless, 3B/2B, 1985–1988
- Brooks Lawrence, P, 1954–1955
- Casey Lawrence, P, 2023
- Kyle Leahy, P, 2023–present
- Tom Leahy, C, 1905
- Mike Leake, P, 2016–2017
- Wade LeBlanc, P, 2021
- Leron Lee, OF, 1969–1971
- Manuel Lee, 2B, 1995
- Jim Lentine, OF, 1978–1980
- Leonard, OF, 1892
- Dominic Leone, P, 2018–2019
- Barry Lersch, P, 1974
- Roy Leslie, 1B, 1919
- Jon Lester, P, 2021
- Dan Lewandowski, P, 1951
- Bill Lewis, C, 1933
- Fred Lewis, OF, 1883–1884
- Johnny Lewis, OF, 1964
- Sixto Lezcano, OF, 1981
- Matthew Liberatore, P, 2022–present
- Don Liddle, P, 1956
- Gene Lillard, P, 1940
- Bob Lillis, SS, 1961
- Mike Lincoln, P, 2004
- Johnny Lindell, OF, 1950
- Jim Lindeman, 1B/OF, 1986–1989
- Jim Lindsey, P, 1929–1934
- Royce Lint, P, 1954
- Larry Lintz, 2B/SS, 1975
- Frank Linzy, P, 1970–1971
- Mark Littell, P, 1978–1982
- Jeff Little, P, 1980
- Mark Little, OF, 1998
- Dick Littlefield, P, 1956
- John Littlefield, P, 1980
- Carlisle Littlejohn, P, 1927–1928
- Danny Litwhiler, OF, 1943–1944, 1946
- Paddy Livingston, C, 1917
- Scott Livingstone, 3B/OF, 1997
- Bobby Locke, P, 1962
- Whitey Lockman, OF, 1956
- Tom Loftus, OF, 1883
- Bill Lohrman, P, 1942
- Kyle Lohse, P, 2008–2012
- Jeoff Long, OF/1B, 1964
- Tom Long, OF, 1915–1917
- Braden Looper, P, 1998, 2006–2008
- Art Lopatka, P, 1945
- Aurelio López, P, 1978
- Felipe López, 3B/2B, 2008, 2010
- Irving Lopez, 3B/2B, 2023
- Joe Lotz, P, 1916
- Ryan Loutos, P, 2024
- Lynn Lovenguth, P, 1957
- John Lovett, P, 1903
- Grover Lowdermilk, P, 1909, 1911
- Lou Lowdermilk, P, 1911–1912
- Sean Lowe, P, 1997–1998
- Peanuts Lowrey, OF, 1950–1954
- Josh Lucas, P, 2017
- Con Lucid, P, 1897
- Eric Ludwick, P, 1996–1997
- Ryan Ludwick, OF, 2007–2010
- Bill Ludwig, C, 1908
- Larry Luebbers, P, 1999
- Julio Lugo, 2B, 2009
- Héctor Luna, 2B/OF/SS, 2004–2006
- Memo Luna, P, 1954
- Ernie Lush, OF, 1910
- Johnny Lush, P, 1907–1910
- Lance Lynn, P, 2011–2015, 2017, 2024
- Bill Lyons, 2B, 1983–1984
- Denny Lyons, 3B, 1891, 1895
- George Lyons, P, 1920
- Harry Lyons, OF, 1887–1888
- Hersh Lyons, P, 1941
- Tyler Lyons, P, 2013–2018

== M ==
- Bob Mabe, P, 1958
- John Mabry, OF/1B, 1994–1998, 2001, 2004–2005
- Mike MacDougal, P, 2010
- Ken MacKenzie, P, 1963
- John Mackinson, P, 1955
- Evan MacLane, P, 2010
- Lonnie Maclin, OF, 1993
- Max Macon, P, 1938
- Bill Magee, P, 1901
- Lee Magee, OF/2B/1B, 1911–1914
- Sal Maglie, P, 1958
- Joe Magrane, P, 1987–1990, 1992–1993
- Art Mahaffey, P, 1966
- Mike Mahoney, 1B, 1898
- Mike Mahoney, C, 2005
- Duster Mails, P, 1925–1926
- James Mallory, OF, 1945
- Gus Mancuso, C, 1928, 1930–1932, 1941–1942
- Seth Maness, P, 2013–2016
- Leslie Mann, OF, 1921–1923
- Fred Manrique, 3B/2B, 1986
- Tom Mansell, OF, 1883
- **Rabbit Maranville**, SS, 1927–1928
- Walt Marbet, P, 1913
- Marty Marion*, SS, 1940–1950
- Roger Maris, OF, 1967–1968
- Fred Marolewski, 1B, 1953
- Mike Maroth, P, 2007
- Jason Marquis, P, 2004–2006
- Eli Marrero, C, 1997–2003
- Chip Marshall, C, 1941
- Doc Marshall, C, 1906–1908
- Joe Marshall, OF/1B, 1906
- Víctor Marte, P, 2012–2013
- Fred Martin, P, 1946, 1949–1950
- John Martin, P, 1980–1983
- Morrie Martin, P, 1957–1958
- Pepper Martin, OF/3B, 1928, 1930–1940, 1944
- Stu Martin, 2B, 1936–1940
- Carlos Martínez, P, 2013–2021
- José Martínez, OF/1B, 2016–2019
- Marty Martínez, SS/2B/3B, 1972
- Silvio Martínez, P, 1978–1981
- Ted Martínez, OF/2B/3B/SS, 1975
- Tino Martinez, 1B, 2002–2003
- Ernie Mason, P/OF, 1894
- Justin Masterson, P, 2014
- Mike Matheny*, C, 2000–2004
- Joe Mather, OF, 2008, 2010
- Greg Mathews, P, 1986–1988, 1990
- Quinn Mathews, P, 2026–present
- T. J. Mathews, P, 1995–1997, 2001
- Phil Maton, P, 2025
- Mike Matthews, P, 2000–2002
- Wally Mattick, OF, 1918
- Steven Matz, P, 2022–2025
- Gene Mauch, SS, 1952
- Harry Maupin, P, 1898
- Brycen Mautz, P, 2026–present
- Dal Maxvill, SS, 1962–1972
- Dustin May, P, 2026
- Jakie May, P, 1917–1921
- Mike Mayers, P, 2016–2019
- Jack McAdams, P, 1911
- Ike McAuley, SS, 1917
- Bake McBride, OF, 1973–1977
- George McBride, SS, 1905–1906
- Pete McBride, P/2B, 1899
- Harry McCaffery, OF/2B/3B/1B, 1882–1883
- Joe McCarthy, C, 1906
- **Tommy McCarthy***, OF, 1888–1891
- Lew McCarty, C, 1920–1921
- Tim McCarver, C, 1959–1961, 1963–1969, 1973–1974
- Jim McCauley, C, 1884
- Pat McCauley, C, 1893
- Kyle McClellan, P, 2008–2012
- Bob McClure, P, 1991–1992
- Billy McCool, P, 1970
- Jim McCormick, 2B/3B, 1892
- Harry McCurdy, C, 1922–1923
- Lindy McDaniel, P, 1955–1962
- Von McDaniel, P, 1957–1958
- Mickey McDermott, P, 1961
- Mike McDermott, P, 1897
- Keith McDonald, C, 2000–2001
- Dewey McDougal, P, 1895–1896
- Sandy McDougal, P, 1905
- Will McEnaney, P, 1979
- Joe McEwing, 2B/OF, 1998–1999
- Guy McFadden, 1B, 1895
- Chappie McFarland, P, 1902–1906
- Ed McFarland, C, 1896–1897
- T. J. McFarland, P, 2021–2022
- Dan McGann, 1B, 1900–1901
- Chippy McGarr, 2B, 1888
- Bill McGee, P, 1935–1941
- Willie McGee, OF, 1982–1990, 1996–1999
- Dan McGeehan, 2B, 1911
- Willie McGill, P, 1891
- Jim McGinley, P, 1904–1905
- Jumbo McGinnis, P, 1882–1886
- Lynn McGlothen, P, 1974–1976
- Stoney McGlynn, P, 1906–1908
- Bob McGraw, P, 1927
- John McGraw, 3B, 1900
- Tom McGraw, P, 1997
- Michael McGreevy, P, 2024–present
- Terry McGriff, C, 1994
- Mark McGrillis, 3B, 1892
- Mark McGwire, 1B, 1997–2001
- Austin McHenry, OF, 1918–1922
- Otto McIvor, OF, 1911
- Cody McKay, C/3B/1B/P, 2004
- Ed McKean, SS, 1899
- Michael McKenry, PH, 2016
- Ralph McLaurin, OF, 1908
- Larry McLean, C, 1904, 1913
- Jerry McNertney, C, 1971–1972
- Mart McQuaid, 2B/OF, 1891
- Trick McSorley, SS, 1886
- Paul McSweeney, 2B/3B, 1891
- Larry McWilliams, P, 1988
- Lee Meadows, P, 1915–1919
- **Joe Medwick**, OF, 1932–1940, 1947–1948
- Dad Meek, C, 1889–1890
- Ryan Meisinger, P, 2020
- Adalberto Mejía, P, 2019
- Alex Mejia, 3B/2B/SS/1B, 2017
- Miguel Mejia, OF, 1996
- Roberto Mejía, 2B/OF, 1997
- Sam Mejías, OF, 1976
- Luis Meléndez, OF, 1970–1976
- Steve Melter, P, 1909
- Ted Menze, OF, 1918
- Óscar Mercado, OF, 2023
- John Mercer, 1B, 1912
- Kent Mercker, P, 1998–1999
- Lloyd Merritt, P, 1957
- Sam Mertes, OF, 1906
- Steve Mesner, 3B, 1941
- Butch Metzger, P, 1977
- Ed Mickelson, 1B, 1950
- Ed Mierkowicz, PH, 1950
- Larry Miggins, OF/1B, 1948, 1952
- Pete Mikkelsen, P, 1968
- Miles Mikolas, P, 2018–2019, 2021–2025
- Eddie Miksis, OF, 1957
- Aaron Miles, 2B, 2006–2008, 2010
- Frank Millard, 2B, 1890
- Andrew Miller, P, 2019–2021
- Bob Miller, P, 1957, 1959–1961
- Brad Miller, 3B/SS/2B, 2020
- Chuck Miller, OF, 1913–1914
- Doggie Miller*, 3B/C, 1894–1895
- Dots Miller, 1B, 1914–1917, 1919
- Dusty Miller, OF, 1890, 1899
- Eddie Miller, SS, 1950
- Elmer Miller, OF, 1912
- Justin Miller, P, 2021
- Kohly Miller, 3B, 1892
- Shelby Miller, P, 2012–2014
- Stu Miller, P, 1952–1954, 1956
- Trever Miller, P, 2009–2011
- Jocko Milligan, C, 1888–1889
- Buster Mills, OF, 1934
- Larry Milton, P, 1903
- **Minnie Miñoso**, OF, 1962
- Bobby Mitchell, OF/P, 1882
- Clarence Mitchell, P, 1928–1930
- **Johnny Mize**, 1B, 1936–1941
- Vinegar Bend Mizell, P, 1952–1953, 1956–1960
- Herb Moford, P, 1955
- Mike Mohler, P, 1999–2000
- Gabe Molina, P, 2002–2003
- Yadier Molina, C, 2004–2022
- Fritz Mollwitz, 1B, 1919
- Jordan Montgomery, P, 2022–2023
- Wally Moon, OF, 1954–1958
- Jim Mooney, P, 1933–1934
- Donnie Moore, P, 1980
- Gene Moore, OF, 1933–1935
- Randy Moore, OF, 1937
- Terry Moore, OF, 1935–1942, 1946–1948
- Tommy Moore, P, 1975
- Whitey Moore, P, 1942
- Jerry Morales, OF, 1978
- Bill Moran, C/OF, 1892
- Charley Moran, C/P/SS, 1903, 1908
- Forrest More, P, 1909
- Bobby Morgan, 2B/3B/SS, 1956
- Eddie Morgan, OF, 1936
- Joe Morgan, PH, 1964
- Mike Morgan, P, 1995–1996
- Gene Moriarty, OF, 1892
- Max Moroff, 2B/3B, 2021
- John Morris, OF, 1986–1990
- Matt Morris, P, 1997–1998, 2000–2005
- Walter Morris, SS, 1908
- Hap Morse, SS/OF, 1911
- Clayton Mortensen, P, 2009
- Charlie Morton, 2B/OF, 1882
- Walt Moryn, OF, 1960–1961
- Brandon Moss, 1B/OF, 2015–2016
- Jason Motte, P, 2008–2012, 2014
- Taylor Motter, 2B/3B/SS/1B/OF, 2023
- Mike Mowrey, 3B, 1909–1913
- Jamie Moyer, P, 1991
- Heinie Mueller, OF, 1920–1926
- Billy Muffett, P, 1957–1958
- Edward Mujica, P, 2012–2013
- Mark Mulder, P, 2005–2008
- Tony Mullane, P/OF, 1883
- Jerry Mumphrey, OF, 1974–1979
- Red Munger, P, 1943–1944, 1946–1952
- Les Munns, P, 1936
- Roddery Muñoz, P, 2025
- Yairo Muñoz, SS/OF/3B/2B, 2018–2019
- John Munyan, C, 1890–1891
- Steve Mura, P, 1982
- Simmy Murch, 2B/3B/SS, 1904–1905
- Tim Murchison, P, 1917
- Wilbur Murdoch, OF, 1908
- Ed Murphy, P, 1901–1903
- Howard Murphy, OF, 1909
- Joe Murphy, P, 1886–1887
- John Murphy, 3B, 1902
- Mike Murphy, C, 1912
- Morgan Murphy, C, 1896–1897
- Rob Murphy, P, 1993–1994
- Tom Murphy, P, 1973
- Red Murray, OF, 1906–1908
- **Stan Musial**, OF/1B, 1941–1944, 1946–1963
- Bert Myers, 3B, 1896
- Hy Myers, OF, 1923–1925
- Lynn Myers, SS, 1938–1939

== N ==
- Mike Nagy, P, 1973
- Sam Nahem, P, 1941
- James Naile, P, 2022–2023
- Sam Narron, C, 1935, 1942–1943
- Chris Narveson, P, 2006
- Ken Nash, 3B/2B/SS, 1914
- Packy Naughton, P, 2022–2023
- Mike Naymick, P, 1944
- Joe Neale, P/OF, 1890–1891
- John Nelson, 1B/SS, 2006
- Mel Nelson, P, 1960, 1968–1969
- Rocky Nelson, 1B, 1949–1951, 1956
- Pat Neshek, P, 2014
- Juan Nicasio, P, 2017
- Art Nichols, 1B/C/OF, 1901–1903
- **Kid Nichols***, P, 1904–1905
- George Nicol, P, 1890
- Hugh Nicol*, OF, 1883–1886
- Charlie Niebergall, C, 1921, 1923–1924
- Tom Niedenfuer, P, 1990
- Dick Niehaus, P, 1913–1915
- Bert Niehoff, 2B, 1918
- Bob Nieman, OF, 1960–1961
- Tom Nieto, C, 1984–1985
- Tom Niland, OF/SS, 1896
- John Nogowski, 1B, 2020–2021
- Pete Noonan, C, 1906–1907
- Lars Nootbaar, OF, 2021–2026
- Irv Noren, OF, 1957–1959
- Fred Norman, P, 1970–1971
- Bud Norris, P, 2018
- Lou North, P, 1917, 1920–1924
- Ron Northey, OF, 1947–1949
- Joe Nossek, OF, 1969–1970
- Abraham Núñez, 3B, 2005
- Howie Nunn, P, 1959
- Rich Nye, P, 1970

== O ==
- Dan O'Brien, P, 1978–1979
- Johnny O'Brien, SS/2B/P, 1958
- Riley O'Brien, P, 2024–present
- Jack O'Connor, C, 1899–1900
- Paddy O'Connor, C, 1914
- Ken O'Dea, C, 1942–1946
- Bob O'Farrell*, C, 1925–1928, 1933, 1935
- Bill O'Hara, OF/1B/P, 1910
- Tom O'Hara, OF, 1906–1907
- Charley O'Leary, SS, 1913
- Randy O'Neal, P, 1987–1988
- Dennis O'Neill, 1B, 1893
- Jack O'Neill, C, 1902–1903
- Mike O'Neill, P, 1901–1904
- Tip O'Neill, OF, 1884–1889, 1891
- Tyler O'Neill, OF, 2018–2023
- Charlie O'Rourke, PH, 1959
- Patsy O'Rourke, SS, 1908
- Tim O'Rourke, 3B, 1894
- Rebel Oakes, OF, 1910–1913
- Henry Oberbeck, OF, 1883
- Ken Oberkfell, 3B, 1977–1984
- Bruce Ogrodowski, C, 1936–1937
- Seung-hwan Oh, P, 2016–2017
- Kevin Ohme, P, 2003
- José Oliva, 3B/1B, 1995
- Ed Olivares, OF/3B, 1960–1961
- Omar Olivares, P, 1990–1994
- Darren Oliver, P, 1998–1999
- Gene Oliver, C/OF, 1959–1963
- Diomedes Olivo, P, 1963
- Al Olmsted, P, 1980
- José Oquendo, 2B, 1986–1995
- Luis Ordaz, SS, 1997–1999
- Joe Orengo, 2B/3B, 1939–1940
- Jesse Orosco, P, 2000
- Ernie Orsatti, OF, 1927–1935
- Bill Ortega, PH, 2001
- Donovan Osborne, P, 1992–1993, 1995–1999
- Champ Osteen, SS, 1908–1909
- Claude Osteen, P, 1974
- Adam Ottavino, P, 2010
- Jim Otten, P, 1980–1981
- John Otten, C/OF, 1895
- Johan Oviedo, P, 2020–2022
- Mickey Owen, C, 1937–1940
- Rick Ownbey, P, 1984, 1986
- Marcell Ozuna, OF, 2018–2019

== P ==
- Ed Pabst, OF, 1890
- Gene Packard, P, 1917–1918
- Dick Padden, 2B, 1901
- Don Padgett, OF/C, 1937–1941
- Pedro Pagés, C, 2024–present
- Matt Pagnozzi, C/1B, 2009–2010
- Tom Pagnozzi, C, 1987–1998
- Phil Paine, P, 1958
- Lance Painter, P, 1997–1999, 2003
- Richie Palacios, OF/2B, 2023
- Vicente Palacios, P, 1994–1995
- Andre Pallante, P, 2022–present
- Orlando Palmeiro, OF, 2003
- Lowell Palmer, P, 1972
- Al Papai, P, 1948, 1950
- Stan Papi, SS/2B, 1974
- Erik Pappas, C, 1993–1994
- Craig Paquette, 3B/OF/1B, 1999–2001
- Freddy Parent, 2B, 1899
- Kelly Paris, 3B/SS, 1982
- Mike Parisi, P, 2008
- Harry Parker, P, 1970–1971, 1975
- Roy Parker, P, 1919
- Roy Parmelee, P, 1936
- Jeff Parrett, P, 1995–1996
- Tom Parrott, OF, 1896
- Stan Partenheimer, P, 1945
- Mike Pasquella, PH, 1919
- Corey Patterson, OF, 2011
- Daryl Patterson, P, 1971
- Harry Patton, P, 1910
- Gene Paulette, 1B, 1917–1919
- Gil Paulsen, P, 1925
- George Paynter, OF, 1894
- Josh Pearce, P, 2002–2004
- Frank Pears, P, 1893
- Alex Pearson, P, 1902
- Jason Pearson, P, 2003
- Homer Peel, OF, 1927, 1930
- Charlie Peete, OF, 1956
- Heinie Peitz, C/3B/1B, 1892–1895, 1913
- Joe Peitz, OF, 1894
- Brayan Peña, C/1B, 2016
- Francisco Peña, C, 2018
- Gerónimo Peña, 2B, 1990–1995
- Orlando Peña, P, 1973–1974
- Tony Peña, C, 1987–1989
- Terry Pendleton, 3B, 1984–1990
- Brad Penny, P, 2010
- Ray Pepper, OF, 1932–1933
- Jhonny Peralta, SS, 2014–2017
- Troy Percival, P, 2007
- Hub Perdue, P, 1914–1915
- Everson Pereira, OF, 2026–present
- Audry Pérez, C, 2013–2014
- Chris Perez, P, 2008–2009
- Eduardo Pérez, OF/1B, 1999–2000, 2002–2003
- Mike Pérez, P, 1990–1994
- Timo Pérez, OF, 2006
- Pol Perritt, P, 1912–1914
- Gerald Perry, 1B, 1991–1995
- Pat Perry, P, 1985–1987
- Bill Pertica, P, 1921–1923
- Steve Peters, P, 1987–1988
- Brock Peterson, OF/1B, 2013
- Mark Petkovsek, P, 1995–1998
- Jeff Pfeffer, P, 1921–1924
- Tommy Pham, OF, 2014–2018, 2024
- Ed Phelps, C, 1909–1910
- Josh Phelps, OF/1B, 2008
- Eddie Phillips, PR, 1953
- Mike Phillips, 2B/SS, 1977–1980
- Bill Phyle, 3B, 1906
- Ron Piché, P, 1966
- Charlie Pickett, P, 1910
- George Pierce, P, 1917
- A. J. Pierzynski, C, 2014
- Joel Piñeiro, P, 2007–2009
- George Pinkney, 3B, 1892
- Vada Pinson, OF, 1969
- Cotton Pippen, P, 1936
- Stephen Piscotty, OF, 2015–2017
- Phil Plantier, OF, 1997
- Tim Plodinec, P, 1972
- Tom Poholsky, P, 1950–1951, 1954–1956
- Plácido Polanco, 3B/2B/SS, 1998–2002
- Cliff Politte, P, 1998
- Howie Pollet, P, 1941–1943, 1946–1951
- Daniel Ponce de Leon, P, 2018–2021
- Sidney Ponson, P, 2006
- Bill Popp, P, 1902
- Colin Porter, OF, 2004
- Darrell Porter, C, 1981–1985
- Jay Porter, C/1B, 1959
- Mike Potter, OF, 1976–1977
- Nels Potter, P, 1936
- Jack Powell, P, 1899–1901
- Ted Power, P, 1989
- Yohel Pozo, C, 2025–2026
- Joe Presko, P, 1951–1954
- César Prieto, 3B/2B/SS, 2025–present
- Mike Proly, P, 1976
- George Puccinelli, OF, 1930, 1932
- Albert Pujols, 1B/OF, 2001–2011, 2022
- Bill Pulsipher, P, 2005
- Nick Punto, 2B, 2011
- Bob Purkey, P, 1965
- Matt Pushard, P, 2026
- Ambrose Puttmann, P, 1906

== Q ==
- Juniel Querecuto, 3B/1B/2B, 2023
- Joe Quest, 2B, 1883–1884
- Finners Quinlan, OF, 1913
- Joe Quinn*, 2B, 1893–1896, 1898, 1900
- José Quintana, P, 2022
- Jamie Quirk, C/3B/SS, 1983
- Dan Quisenberry, P, 1988–1989

== R ==
- Roy Radebaugh, P, 1911
- Dave Rader, C, 1977
- Scott Radinsky, P, 1999–2000
- Ken Raffensberger, P, 1939
- Brady Raggio, P, 1997–1998
- Max Rajcic, P, 2026
- Gary Rajsich, 1B, 1984
- John Raleigh, P, 1909–1910
- Milt Ramírez, SS, 1970–1971
- Roel Ramírez, P, 2020–2021
- Mike Ramsey, 2B/SS/3B, 1978, 1980–1984
- Toad Ramsey, P, 1889–1890
- Dick Rand, C, 1953, 1955
- Nick Raquet, P, 2025
- Vic Raschi, P, 1954–1955
- Colby Rasmus, OF, 2009–2011
- Eric Rasmussen, P, 1975–1978, 1982–1983
- Tommy Raub, C, 1906
- Rangel Ravelo, 1B/OF, 2019–2020
- Floyd Rayford, 3B, 1983
- Bugs Raymond, P, 1907–1908
- Britt Reames, P, 2000
- Art Rebel, OF, 1945
- Phil Redding, P, 1912–1913
- Milt Reed, PH, 1911
- Ron Reed, P, 1975
- Bill Reeder, P, 1949
- Jimmie Reese, 2B, 1932
- Tom Reilly, SS, 1908–1909
- Art Reinhart, P, 1919, 1925–1928
- Jack Reis, P, 1911
- Ken Reitz, 3B, 1972–1975, 1977–1980
- Édgar Rentería, SS, 1999–2004
- Bob Repass, 2B, 1939
- Rip Repulski, OF, 1953–1956
- George Rettger, P/OF, 1891
- Jerry Reuss, P, 1969–1971
- Al Reyes, P, 2004–2005
- Alex Reyes, P, 2016, 2018–2021
- Anthony Reyes, P, 2005–2008
- Dennys Reyes, P, 2009–2010
- Bob Reynolds, P, 1971
- Ken Reynolds, P, 1975
- Mark Reynolds, 1B, 2015
- Flint Rhem, P, 1924–1928, 1930–1932, 1934, 1936
- Bob Rhoads, P/OF, 1903
- Arthur Rhodes, P, 2011
- Charlie Rhodes, P, 1906, 1908–1909
- Dennis Ribant, P, 1969
- Del Rice, C, 1945–1955, 1960
- Hal Rice, OF, 1948–1953
- Chris Richard, OF/1B, 2000
- Lee Richard, 2B/SS/3B, 1976
- Bill Richardson, 1B, 1901
- Gordie Richardson, P, 1964
- Pete Richert, P, 1974
- Don Richmond, 3B, 1951
- Dave Ricketts, C, 1963, 1965, 1967–1969
- Dick Ricketts, P, 1959
- John Ricks, 3B, 1891, 1894
- Elmer Rieger, P, 1910
- Joe Riggert, OF, 1914
- Lew Riggs, PH, 1934
- Andy Rincon, P, 1980–1982
- Hancel Rincon, P, 2026–present
- Ricardo Rincón, P, 2006
- Jimmy Ring, P, 1927
- Tink Riviere, P, 1921
- Skipper Roberts, C, 1913
- Kramer Robertson, SS, 2022
- Nick Robertson, P, 2024
- Drew Robinson, OF, 2019
- Hank Robinson, P, 1914–1915
- Kerry Robinson, OF, 2001–2003
- Shane Robinson, OF, 2009, 2011–2014
- **Wilbert Robinson**, C, 1900
- Yank Robinson, 2B, 1885–1889, 1891
- Jack Roche, C, 1914–1915, 1917
- John Rodriguez, OF, 2005–2006
- José Rodríguez, P, 2000, 2002
- Nerio Rodríguez, P, 2002
- Rich Rodriguez, P, 1994–1995
- Preacher Roe, P, 1938
- Wally Roettger, OF, 1927–1929, 1931
- Cookie Rojas, 2B/OF/SS, 1970
- Stan Rojek, SS, 1951
- **Scott Rolen**, 3B, 2002–2007
- Ray Rolling, 2B, 1912
- Drew Rom, P, 2023
- Johnny Romano, C, 1967
- J. C. Romero, P, 2012
- JoJo Romero, P, 2022–2026
- Austin Romine, C, 2022
- John Romonosky, P, 1953
- Marc Ronan, C, 1993
- Ángel Rondón, P, 2021–2022
- Jorge Rondón, P, 2014
- José Rondón, OF/3B/2B/1B, 2021
- Gene Roof, OF, 1981–1983
- Jorge Roque, OF, 1970–1972
- Alberto Rosario, C/3B, 2016–2017
- Mike Rose, C, 2006
- Chief Roseman*, OF, 1890
- Trevor Rosenthal, P, 2012–2017
- Tyson Ross, P, 2018
- Jack Rothrock, OF, 1934–1935
- Chris Roycroft, P, 2024–2026
- Stan Royer, 3B/1B, 1991–1994
- Dave Rucker, P, 1983–1984
- Ken Rudolph, C, 1975–1976
- Jack Russell, P, 1940
- Paul Russell, 2B/3B/OF, 1894
- Brendan Ryan, SS, 2007–2010
- Jack Ryan, C, 1901–1903
- Mike Ryan, 3B, 1895
- Mike Ryba, P, 1935–1938
- Marc Rzepczynski, P, 2011–2013

== S ==
- Chris Sabo, 1B/3B, 1995
- Ray Sadecki, P, 1960–1966, 1975
- Bob Sadowski, 2B, 1960
- Thomas Saggese, 2B/SS, 2024–present
- Fernando Salas, P, 2010–2013
- Mark Salas, C/OF, 1984
- Slim Sallee, P, 1908–1916
- Ike Samuels, 3B/SS, 1895
- Ali Sánchez, C, 2021
- Eduardo Sánchez, P, 2011–2012
- Orlando Sánchez, C, 1981–1983
- Ricardo Sánchez, P, 2020
- Ray Sanders, 1B, 1942–1945
- Reggie Sanders, OF, 2004–2005
- War Sanders, P, 1903–1904
- Rafael Santana, 2B/SS/3B, 1983
- Al Santorini, P, 1971–1973
- Bill Sarni, C, 1951–1952, 1954–1956
- Luis Saturria, OF, 2000–2001
- Ed Sauer, OF, 1949
- Hank Sauer, OF, 1956
- Ted Savage, OF, 1965–1967
- Carl Sawatski, C, 1960–1963
- Steve Scarsone, 2B/OF/3B, 1997
- Jimmie Schaffer, C, 1961–1962
- Bobby Schang, C, 1927
- John Schappert, P/1B/OF, 1882
- Bob Scheffing, C, 1951
- Carl Scheib, P, 1954
- Richie Scheinblum, PH, 1974
- Bill Schindler, C, 1920
- Freddy Schmidt, P, 1944, 1946–1947
- Walter Schmidt, C, 1925
- Willard Schmidt, P, 1952–1953, 1955–1957
- **Red Schoendienst***, 2B, 1945–1956, 1961–1963
- Ducky Schofield, SS/2B, 1953–1958, 1968, 1971
- Ossee Schreckengost, 1B, 1899
- Pop Schriver, C/1B, 1901
- Max Schrock, 2B/3B/P, 2020
- Heinie Schuble, SS, 1927, 1936
- Johnny Schulte, C, 1927
- Barney Schultz, P, 1955, 1963–1965
- Buddy Schultz, P, 1977–1979
- Joe Schultz, OF, 1919–1924
- Walt Schulz, P, 1920
- John Schulze, C, 1891
- Skip Schumaker, 2B/OF, 2005–2012
- Ferdie Schupp, P, 1919–1921
- Lou Scoffic, OF, 1936
- George Scott, P, 1920
- Tony Scott, OF, 1977–1981
- Victor Scott II, OF, 2024–present
- Xavier Scruggs, 1B, 2014–2015
- Scott Seabol, 3B/2B/1B/OF, 2005
- Kim Seaman, P, 1979–1980
- Diego Seguí, P, 1972–1973
- Epp Sell, P, 1922–1923
- Carey Selph, 2B, 1929
- Walter Sessi, OF, 1941, 1946
- George Seward, OF, 1882
- Jimmy Sexton, SS/3B, 1983
- Mike Shannon, 3B/OF, 1962–1970
- Spike Shannon, OF, 1904–1906
- Wally Shannon, 2B/SS, 1959–1960
- Bobby Shantz, P, 1962–1964
- Al Shaw, OF, 1907–1909
- Don Shaw, P, 1971–1972
- Danny Shay, SS/2B, 1904–1905
- Gerry Shea, C, 1905
- Danny Sheaffer, C/3B, 1995–1997
- Jimmy Sheckard, OF, 1913
- Biff Sheehan, OF, 1895–1896
- Ray Shepardson, C, 1924
- Bill Sherdel, P, 1918–1930, 1932
- Ryan Sherriff, P, 2017–2018
- Tim Sherrill, P, 1990–1991
- Charlie Shields, P, 1907
- Vince Shields, P, 1924
- Ralph Shinners, OF, 1925
- Bob Shirley, P, 1981
- Burt Shotton, OF, 1919–1923
- Clyde Shoun, P, 1938–1942
- John Shoupe, 2B, 1882
- Chasen Shreve, P, 2018–2019
- Frank Shugart, OF/SS, 1893–1894
- Jared Shuster, P, 2026
- Michael Siani, OF, 2023–2025
- Dick Siebert, 1B, 1937–1938
- Sonny Siebert, P, 1974
- Kevin Siegrist, P, 2013–2017
- Magneuris Sierra, OF, 2017
- Curt Simmons, P, 1960–1966
- **Ted Simmons**, C, 1968–1980
- Jason Simontacchi, P, 2002–2004
- Dick Simpson, OF, 1968
- Dick Sisler, 1B/OF, 1946–1947, 1952–1953
- Ted Sizemore, 2B, 1971–1975
- Bob Skinner, OF, 1964–1966
- Gordon Slade, SS, 1933
- Jack Slattery, C, 1906
- **Enos Slaughter**, OF, 1938–1942, 1946–1953
- Heathcliff Slocumb, P, 1999–2000
- Bill Smiley, 2B, 1882
- Bill Smith, P, 1958–1959
- Bob Smith, P, 1957
- Bobby Smith, OF, 1957–1959, 1962
- Bryn Smith, P, 1990–1992
- Bud Smith, P, 2001–2002
- Charley Smith, 3B, 1966
- Earl Smith, C, 1928–1930
- Frank Smith, P, 1955
- Fred Smith, 3B, 1917
- Germany Smith, SS, 1898
- Hal Smith, C, 1956–1961
- Jack Smith, OF, 1915–1926
- Jud Smith, 3B, 1893
- Keith Smith, OF, 1979–1980
- **Lee Smith**, P, 1990–1993
- Lonnie Smith, OF, 1982–1985
- **Ozzie Smith**, SS, 1982–1996
- Reggie Smith, OF/1B, 1974–1976
- Tom Smith, P, 1898
- Travis Smith, P, 2002
- Wally Smith, 3B/SS, 1911–1912
- Willie Smith, P, 1994
- **John Smoltz**, P, 2009
- Homer Smoot, OF, 1902–1906
- Red Smyth, OF, 1917–1918
- Frank Snyder, C, 1912–1919, 1927
- Miguel Socolovich, P, 2015–2017
- Clint Sodowsky, P, 1999
- Ray Soff, P, 1986–1987
- Eddie Solomon, P, 1976
- Lary Sorensen, P, 1981
- George Soriano, P, 2026–present
- Edmundo Sosa, SS/2B, 2018–2019, 2021–2022
- Elías Sosa, P, 1975
- Jorge Sosa, P, 2006
- Allen Sothoron, P, 1924–1926
- **Billy Southworth***, OF, 1926–1927, 1929
- Cory Spangenberg, 3B, 2022
- Chris Speier, SS, 1984
- Daryl Spencer, SS, 1960–1961
- Ed Spiezio, 3B, 1964–1968
- Scott Spiezio, 3B/OF, 2006–2007
- Scipio Spinks, P, 1972–1973
- Ed Sprague Sr., P, 1973
- Jack Spring, P, 1964
- Russ Springer, P, 2003, 2007–2008
- Joe Sprinz, C, 1933
- Tuck Stainback, OF, 1938
- Gerry Staley, P, 1947–1954
- Harry Staley, P, 1895
- Tracy Stallard, P, 1965–1966
- Virgil Stallcup, SS, 1952–1953
- Pete Standridge, P, 1911
- Ryne Stanek, P, 2026
- Eddie Stanky*, 2B, 1952–1953
- Cody Stanley, C, 2015
- Ray Starr, P, 1932
- Nick Stavinoha, OF, 2008–2010
- Gene Stechschulte, P, 2000–2002
- Bill Steele, P, 1910–1914
- Bob Steele, P, 1916–1917
- Bill Stein, OF/3B/1B, 1972–1973
- Henry Stein, C, 1900
- Jake Stenzel, OF, 1898–1899
- Ray Stephens, C, 1990–1991
- Bob Stephenson, SS, 1955
- Garrett Stephenson, P, 1999–2000, 2002–2003
- Stuffy Stewart, 2B/OF, 1916–1917
- Kelly Stinnett, C, 2007
- Bob Stinson, C/OF, 1971
- Jack Stivetts, P/OF, 1889–1891
- Chuck Stobbs, P, 1958
- Milt Stock, 3B, 1919–1923
- Dean Stone, P, 1959
- Tige Stone, OF/P, 1923
- Alan Storke, SS, 1909
- Todd Stottlemyre, P, 1996–1998
- Allyn Stout, P, 1931–1933
- Chris Stratton, P, 2022–2023
- Gabby Street*, C, 1931
- Cub Stricker*, 2B/SS, 1892
- George Strief, 2B/OF, 1883–1884
- Joe Stripp, 3B, 1938
- Al Strueve, C/OF, 1884
- Peter Strzelecki, P, 2026
- Johnny Stuart, P, 1922–1925
- John Stuper, P, 1982–1984
- Andrew Suárez, P, 2023
- Willie Sudhoff, P, 1897–1901
- Joe Sugden, C, 1898
- Dan Sullivan, C/1B, 1885
- Harry Sullivan, P, 1909
- Joe Sullivan, OF, 1896
- Sleeper Sullivan, C, 1882–1883
- Suter Sullivan, SS/OF/2B/1B/P, 1898
- Kid Summers, C/OF, 1893
- Tom Sunkel, P, 1937, 1939
- Jeff Suppan, P, 2004–2006, 2010
- Max Surkont, P, 1956
- Rick Sutcliffe, P, 1994
- Gary Sutherland, 2B, 1978
- **Bruce Sutter**, P, 1981–1984
- Jack Sutthoff, P, 1899
- John Sutton, P, 1977
- Larry Sutton, 1B/OF, 2000–2001
- Matt Svanson, P, 2025–present
- Mark Sweeney, OF/1B, 1995–1997
- Pete Sweeney, 3B/2B/1B/OF, 1889–1890
- Charlie Swindells, C, 1904
- Steve Swisher, C, 1978–1980
- Bob Sykes, P, 1979–1981
- Lou Sylvester, OF/2B, 1887

== T ==
- Jeff Tabaka, P, 2001
- So Taguchi, OF, 2002–2007
- Brian Tallet, P, 2011
- John Tamargo, C, 1976–1978
- Travis Tartamella, C, 2015
- Lee Tate, SS, 1958–1959
- Fernando Tatís, 3B, 1998–2000
- Don Taussig, OF, 1961
- Julián Tavárez, P, 2004–2005
- Oscar Taveras, OF, 2014
- Carl Taylor, OF, 1970
- Chuck Taylor, P, 1969–1971
- Ed Taylor, P, 1903
- Jack Taylor, P, 1898
- Jack Taylor, P, 1904–1906
- Joe Taylor, OF, 1958
- Ron Taylor, P, 1963–1965
- Bud Teachout, P, 1932
- Patsy Tebeau*, 1B, 1899–1900
- Rubén Tejada, 3B/SS/2B/P, 2016
- Garry Templeton, SS, 1976–1981
- Gene Tenace, C, 1981–1982
- Ryan Tepera, P, 2023
- Greg Terlecky, P, 1975
- Scott Terry, P, 1987–1991
- Dick Terwilliger, P, 1932
- Bob Tewksbury, P, 1989–1994
- Moe Thacker, C, 1963
- Ryan Theriot, SS/2B, 2011
- Tommy Thevenow, SS, 1924–1928
- Jake Thielman, P, 1905–1906
- Lane Thomas, OF, 2019–2021
- Roy Thomas, P, 1978–1980
- Tom Thomas, P, 1899–1900
- Brad Thompson, P, 2005–2009
- Gus Thompson, P, 1906
- Mark Thompson, P, 1999–2000
- Mike Thompson, P, 1973–1974
- Milt Thompson, OF, 1989–1992
- Zack Thompson, P, 2022–2024
- John Thornton, OF, 1892
- Joe Thurston, 3B/2B, 2009
- Bobby Tiefenauer, P, 1952, 1955, 1961
- Mike Timlin, P, 2000–2002
- Bud Tinning, P, 1935
- Jess Todd, P, 2009
- Bobby Tolan, OF, 1965–1968
- Brett Tomko, P, 2003
- Fred Toney, P, 1923
- Specs Toporcer, SS/2B/3B, 1921–1928
- **Joe Torre***, 3B/1B, 1969–1974
- Bryan Torres, OF, 2026–present
- Mike Torrez, P, 1967–1971
- Paul Toth, P, 1962
- Harry Trekell, P, 1913
- Coaker Triplett, OF, 1941–1943
- Mike Trost, C/OF, 1890
- Bill Trotter, P, 1944
- Tommy Tucker, 1B, 1898
- John Tudor, P, 1985–1988, 1990
- Oscar Tuero, P, 1918–1920
- Sam Tuivailala, P, 2014–2018
- Lee Tunnell, P, 1987
- Tuck Turner, OF, 1896–1898
- Art Twineham, C, 1893–1894
- Mike Tyson, 2B/SS, 1972–1979

== U ==
- Bob Uecker, C, 1964–1965
- Tom Underwood, P, 1977
- Jack Urban, P, 1959
- Tom Urbani, P, 1993–1996
- Ramón Urías, 3B, 2026
- José Uribe, SS/2B, 1984
- John Urrea, P, 1977–1980
- Lon Ury, 1B, 1903

== V ==
- Raúl Valdés, P, 2011
- Benny Valenzuela, 3B, 1958
- Fernando Valenzuela, P, 1997
- Breyvic Valera, 2B, 2017
- Bill Van Dyke, OF, 1892
- Jay Van Noy, OF, 1951
- Andy Van Slyke, OF, 1983–1986
- **Dazzy Vance**, P, 1933–1934
- John Vann, PH, 1913
- Nelson Velázquez, OF, 2026
- Anthony Veneziano, P, 2025
- Emil Verban, 2B, 1944–1946
- Dave Veres, P, 2000–2002
- Johnny Vergez, 3B, 1936
- Drew VerHagen, P, 2022–2023
- Ernie Vick, C, 1922, 1924–1926
- Ryan Vilade, OF, 2025
- Carlos Villanueva, P, 2015
- Héctor Villanueva, C, 1993
- Ron Villone, P, 2008
- Fernando Viña, 2B, 2000–2003
- Bob Vines, P, 1924
- Bill Virdon, OF, 1955–1956
- Joe Visner, OF, 1891
- José Vizcaíno, SS/2B/1B, 2006
- Luke Voit, 1B, 2017–2018
- Dave Von Ohlen, P, 1983–1984
- Bill Voss, OF, 1972
- Pete Vuckovich, P, 1978–1980

== W ==
- Michael Wacha, P, 2013–2019
- Brandon Waddell, P, 2021
- Ben Wade, P, 1954
- Leon Wagner, OF, 1960
- Dave Wainhouse, P, 2000
- Adam Wainwright, P, 2005–2010, 2012–2023
- Jordan Walden, P, 2015
- Bill Walker, P, 1933–1936
- Duane Walker, OF/1B, 1988
- Harry Walker*, OF, 1940–1943, 1946–1947, 1950–1951, 1955
- Jordan Walker, OF, 2023–present
- **Larry Walker**, OF, 2004–2005
- Oscar Walker, OF, 1882
- Roy Walker, P, 1921–1922
- Speed Walker, 1B, 1923
- Tom Walker, P, 1976
- **Bobby Wallace**, SS, 1899–1901, 1917–1918
- Mike Wallace, P, 1975–1976
- Tye Waller, 3B, 1980
- Denny Walling, 1B, 1988–1990
- Jake Walsh, P, 2022
- P. J. Walters, P, 2009–2011
- Dick Ward, P, 1935
- Cy Warmoth, P, 1916
- Lon Warneke, P, 1937–1942
- Jack Warner, C, 1905
- Bill Warwick, C, 1925–1926
- Carl Warwick, OF, 1961–1962, 1964–1965
- Ray Washburn, P, 1961–1969
- Rico Washington, 3B/OF/2B, 2008
- Gary Waslewski, P, 1969
- Steve Waterbury, P, 1976
- George Watkins, OF, 1930–1933
- Allen Watson, P, 1993–1995
- Milt Watson, P, 1916–1917
- Art Weaver, C, 1902–1903
- Jeff Weaver, P, 2006
- Luke Weaver, P, 2016–2018
- Skeeter Webb, SS, 1932
- Tyler Webb, P, 2018–2021
- Herm Wehmeier, P, 1956–1958
- Bob Weiland, P, 1937–1940
- Curt Welch, OF, 1885–1887
- Todd Wellemeyer, P, 2007–2009
- Jake Wells, C/OF, 1890
- Kip Wells, P, 2007
- Perry Werden, 1B, 1892–1893
- Bill Werle, P, 1952
- Jake Westbrook, P, 2010–2013
- Wally Westlake, OF, 1951–1952
- JJ Wetherholt, 2B, 2026–present
- Gus Weyhing, P, 1900
- Dick Wheeler, OF, 1918
- Harry Wheeler, OF, 1884
- Jimmy Whelan, PH, 1913
- Pete Whisenant, OF, 1955
- Lew Whistler, OF/1B, 1893
- Abe White, P, 1937
- Bill White, SS, 1888
- Bill White, 1B, 1959–1965, 1969
- Ernie White, P, 1940–1943
- Gabe White, P, 2005
- Hal White, P, 1953–1954
- Jerry White, OF, 1986
- Rick White, P, 2002
- Burgess Whitehead, 2B/SS/3B, 1933–1935
- Mark Whiten, OF, 1993–1994
- Fred Whitfield, 1B, 1962
- Kodi Whitley, P, 2020–2022
- Art Whitney, 3B, 1891
- Bill Whitrock, P/OF, 1890
- Possum Whitted, OF/3B/SS, 1912–1914
- Bob Wicker, P/OF, 1901–1903
- Floyd Wicker, PH, 1968
- Chris Widger, C, 2003
- Matt Wieters, C, 2019–2020
- Ty Wigginton, 1B/OF/3B, 2013
- Bill Wight, P, 1958
- Fred Wigington, P, 1923
- Del Wilber, C, 1946–1949
- **Hoyt Wilhelm**, P, 1957
- Denney Wilie, OF, 1911–1912
- Rick Wilkins, C, 2000
- Ted Wilks, P, 1944–1951
- Jerome Williams, P, 2016
- Jimy Williams, SS/2B, 1966–1967
- Justin Williams, OF, 2020–2021
- Otto Williams, SS, 1902–1903
- Stan Williams, P, 1971
- Steamboat Williams, P, 1914, 1916
- Woody Williams, P, 2001–2004
- Howie Williamson, PH, 1928
- Joe Willis, P, 1911–1913
- Ron Willis, P, 1966–1969
- **Vic Willis**, P, 1910
- Charlie Wilson, SS/3B, 1932–1933, 1935
- Chief Wilson, OF, 1914–1916
- Craig Wilson, 3B, 1989–1992
- Jimmie Wilson, C, 1928–1933
- Preston Wilson, OF, 2006–2007
- Zeke Wilson, P, 1899
- Jim Winford, P, 1932, 1934–1937
- Ivey Wingo, C, 1911–1914
- Masyn Winn, SS, 2023–present
- Randy Winn, OF, 2010
- Cade Winquest, P, 2026–present
- Tom Winsett, OF, 1935
- Patrick Wisdom, 3B/1B, 2018
- Rick Wise, P, 1972–1973
- Corky Withrow, OF, 1963
- Bobby Witt, P, 1998
- Nick Wittgren, P, 2022
- Jimmy Wolf, OF, 1892
- Harry Wolter, OF/P, 1907
- Tony Womack, 2B, 2004
- Kolten Wong, 2B, 2013–2020
- John Wood, P, 1896
- Gene Woodburn, P, 1911–1912
- Hal Woodeshick, P, 1965–1967
- Jake Woodford, P, 2020–2023
- Tracy Woodson, 3B, 1992–1993
- Frank Woodward, P, 1919
- Floyd Wooldridge, P, 1955
- Mark Worrell, P, 2008
- Todd Worrell, P, 1985–1989, 1992
- Red Worthington, PH, 1934
- Jamey Wright, P, 2002
- Mel Wright, P, 1954–1955

== Y ==
- Esteban Yan, P, 2003
- Juan Yepez, OF, 2022–2023
- Stan Yerkes, P, 1901–1903
- Ray Yochim, P, 1948–1949
- Babe Young, 1B, 1948
- Bobby Young, 3B, 1948
- **Cy Young**, P, 1899–1900
- Dmitri Young, 1B, 1996–1997
- Gerald Young, OF, 1994
- J. B. Young, P, 1892
- Pep Young, SS/3B/2B, 1941, 1945
- Joel Youngblood, OF/3B, 1977
- Eddie Yuhas, P, 1952–1953
- Sal Yvars, C, 1953–1954

== Z ==
- Chris Zachary, P, 1971
- Elmer Zacher, OF, 1910
- George Zackert, P, 1911–1912
- Dave Zearfoss, C, 1904–1905
- Todd Zeile, 3B, 1989–1995
- Bart Zeller, C, 1970
- Bill Zies, C, 1891
- Eddie Zimmerman, 3B, 1906
- Bruce Zimmermann, P, 2026
- Ed Zmich, P, 1910–1911
- Guillermo Zuñiga, P, 2023
