= 1910 St. Louis Cardinals season =

Major League Baseball season

1910 St. Louis Cardinals
- League: National League
- Ballpark: League Park
- City: St. Louis, Missouri
- Record: 63–90 (.412)
- League place: 7th
- Owners: Frank Robison and Stanley Robison
- Managers: Roger Bresnahan

The 1910 St. Louis Cardinals season was the team's 29th season in St. Louis, Missouri and the 19th season in the National League. The Cardinals went 63–90 during the season and finished seventh in the National League.

== Regular season ==
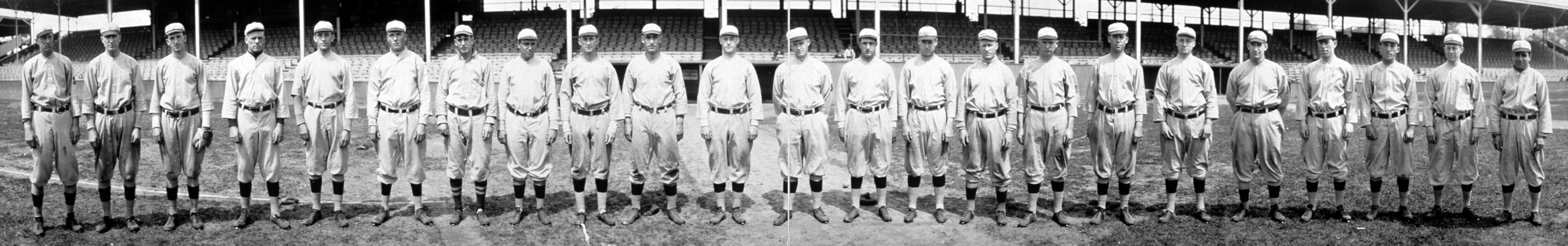

=== Season standings ===
National League
Team	W	L	Pct.	GB	Home	Road
Chicago Cubs	104	50	.675	—	58‍–‍19	46‍–‍31
New York Giants	91	63	.591	13	52‍–‍26	39‍–‍37
Pittsburgh Pirates	86	67	.562	17½	46‍–‍30	40‍–‍37
Philadelphia Phillies	78	75	.510	25½	40‍–‍36	38‍–‍39
Cincinnati Reds	75	79	.487	29	39‍–‍37	36‍–‍42
Brooklyn Superbas	64	90	.416	40	39‍–‍39	25‍–‍51
St. Louis Cardinals	63	90	.412	40½	35‍–‍41	28‍–‍49
Boston Doves	53	100	.346	50½	29‍–‍48	24‍–‍52

=== Record vs. opponents ===
1910 National League record Sources:
Team	BSN	BRO	CHC	CIN	NYG	PHI	PIT	STL
Boston	—	10–12	5–17	8–14–1	6–16–1	4–17–2	8–14	12–10
Brooklyn	12–10	—	6–16	7–15	8–14	9–13–1	10–12–1	12–10
Chicago	17–5	16–6	—	16–6	14–8	14–8	12–10	15–7
Cincinnati	14–8–1	15–7	6–16	—	8–14	10–12–1	10–12	12–10
New York	16–6–1	14–8	8–14	14–8	—	15–7	12–10	12–10
Philadelphia	17–4–2	13–9–1	8–14	12–10–1	7–15	—	11–11	10–12
Pittsburgh	14–8	12–10–1	10–12	12–10	10–12	11–11	—	17–4
St. Louis	10–12	10–12	7–15	10–12	10–12	12–10	4–17	—

=== Roster ===
1910 St. Louis Cardinals
Roster
Pitchers: Cy Alberts; Les Backman; Bill Chambers; Frank Corridon; Rube Geyer; Roy Golden; Bob Harmon; Bunny Hearn; Eddie Higgins; Johnny Lush; Harry Patton; Charlie Pickett; John Raleigh; Elmer Rieger; Slim Sallee; Bill Steele; Vic Willis; Ed Zmich	Catchers: Jack Bliss; Roger Bresnahan; Billy Kelly; Ed Phelps; Infielders: Jap Barbeau; Frank Betcher; Arnold Hauser; Miller Huggins; Rudy Hulswitt; Ed Konetchy; Mike Mowrey	Outfielders: Ody Abbott; Rube Ellis; Steve Evans; Ernie Lush; Bill O'Hara; Rebel Oakes; Elmer Zacher	Manager: Roger Bresnahan

== Player stats ==
=== Batting ===
==== Starters by position ====
Note: Pos = Position; G = Games played; AB = At bats; H = Hits; Avg. = Batting average; HR = Home runs; RBI = Runs batted in

Pos	Player	G	AB	H	Avg.	HR	RBI
C	Ed Phelps	93	270	71	.263	0	37
1B	Ed Konetchy	144	520	157	.302	3	78
2B	Miller Huggins	151	547	145	.265	1	36
SS	Arnold Hauser	119	375	77	.205	2	36
3B	Mike Mowrey	143	489	138	.282	2	70
OF	Steve Evans	151	506	122	.241	2	73
OF	Rebel Oakes	131	468	118	.252	0	43
OF	Rube Ellis	142	550	142	.258	4	54

==== Other batters ====
Note: G = Games played; AB = At bats; H = Hits; Avg. = Batting average; HR = Home runs; RBI = Runs batted in

Player	G	AB	H	Avg.	HR	RBI
Roger Bresnahan	88	234	65	.278	0	27
Rudy Hulswitt	63	133	33	.248	0	14
Elmer Zacher	47	132	28	.212	0	10
Frank Betcher	35	89	18	.202	0	6
Ody Abbott	22	70	13	.186	0	6
Jack Bliss	16	33	2	.061	0	3
Jap Barbeau	7	21	4	.190	0	2
Bill O'Hara	9	20	3	.150	0	2
Ernie Lush	1	4	0	.000	0	0
Billy Kelly	2	2	0	.000	0	0

=== Pitching ===
==== Starting pitchers ====
Note: G = Games pitched; IP = Innings pitched; W = Wins; L = Losses; ERA = Earned run average; SO = Strikeouts

Player	G	IP	W	L	ERA	SO
Bob Harmon	43	236.0	13	15	4.46	87
Johnny Lush	36	225.1	14	13	3.20	54
Vic Willis	33	212.0	9	12	3.35	67
Slim Sallee	18	115.0	7	8	2.97	46
Bill Steele	9	71.2	4	4	3.27	25
Roy Golden	7	42.2	2	3	4.43	31
Bunny Hearn	5	39.0	1	3	5.08	14
Cy Alberts	4	27.2	1	2	6.18	10

==== Other pitchers ====
Note: G = Games pitched; IP = Innings pitched; W = Wins; L = Losses; ERA = Earned run average; SO = Strikeouts

Player	G	IP	W	L	ERA	SO
Frank Corridon	30	156.0	6	14	3.81	51
Les Backman	26	116.0	6	7	3.03	41
Ed Zmich	9	36.0	0	5	6.25	19
John Raleigh	3	5.0	0	0	9.00	2

==== Relief pitchers ====
Note: G = Games pitched; W = Wins; L = Losses; SV = Saves; ERA = Earned run average; SO = Strikeouts

Player	G	W	L	SV	ERA	SO
Elmer Rieger	13	0	2	0	5.48	9
Rube Geyer	4	0	1	0	4.50	5
Eddie Higgins	2	0	1	0	4.35	1
Charlie Pickett	2	0	0	0	1.50	2
Harry Patton	1	0	0	0	2.25	2
Ed Konetchy	1	0	0	0	4.50	0
Roger Bresnahan	1	0	0	0	0.00	0
Bill O'Hara	1	0	0	0	0.00	0
Bill Chambers	1	0	0	0	0.00	0
