= 1909 St. Louis Cardinals season =

Major League Baseball season

1909 St. Louis Cardinals
- League: National League
- Ballpark: League Park
- City: St. Louis, Missouri
- Record: 54–98 (.355)
- League place: 7th
- Owners: Frank Robison and Stanley Robison
- Managers: Roger Bresnahan

The 1909 St. Louis Cardinals season was the team's 28th season in St. Louis, Missouri and the 18th season in the National League. The Cardinals went 54–98 during the season and finished seventh in the National League.

== Regular season ==
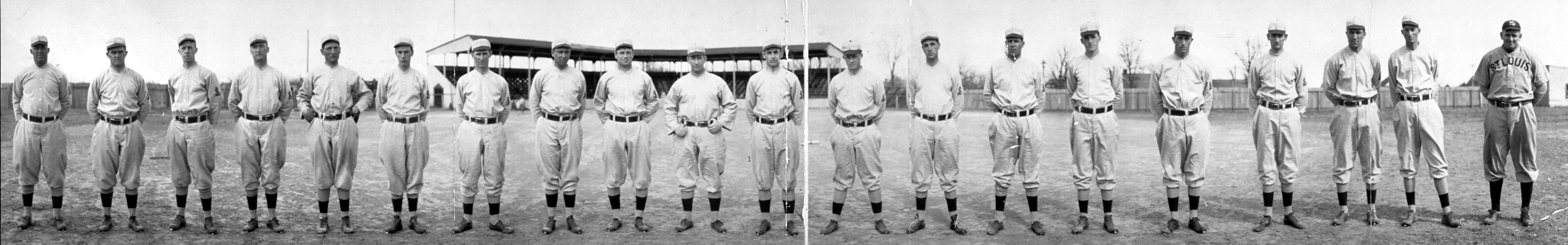

=== Season standings ===
National League
Team	W	L	Pct.	GB	Home	Road
Pittsburgh Pirates	110	42	.724	—	56‍–‍21	54‍–‍21
Chicago Cubs	104	49	.680	6½	47‍–‍29	57‍–‍20
New York Giants	92	61	.601	18½	44‍–‍33	48‍–‍28
Cincinnati Reds	77	76	.503	33½	39‍–‍38	38‍–‍38
Philadelphia Phillies	74	79	.484	36½	40‍–‍37	34‍–‍42
Brooklyn Superbas	55	98	.359	55½	34‍–‍45	21‍–‍53
St. Louis Cardinals	54	98	.355	56	26‍–‍48	28‍–‍50
Boston Doves	45	108	.294	65½	27‍–‍47	18‍–‍61

=== Record vs. opponents ===
1909 National League record Sources:
Team	BSN	BRO	CHC	CIN	NYG	PHI	PIT	STL
Boston	—	11–11	1–21	5–17	8–14–2	10–12	1–20	9–13
Brooklyn	11–11	—	5–16	5–17–1	7–15	11–11	4–18	12–10–1
Chicago	21–1	16–5	—	16–6	11–11–1	16–6	9–13	15–7–1
Cincinnati	17–5	17–5–1	6–16	—	9–13–1	9–12–1	7–15–1	12–10
New York	14–8–2	15–7	11–11–1	13–9–1	—	12–10	11–11–1	16–5
Philadelphia	12–10	11–11	6–16	12–9–1	10–12	—	7–15	16–6
Pittsburgh	20–1	18–4	13–9	15–7–1	11–11–1	15–7	—	18–3
St. Louis	13–9	10–12–1	7–15–1	10–12	5–16	6–16	3–18	—

=== Roster ===
1909 St. Louis Cardinals
Roster
Pitchers: Les Backman; Fred Beebe; Joe Bernard; Bob Harmon; Irv Higginbotham; Eddie Higgins; Grover Lowdermilk; Johnny Lush; Steve Melter; Forrest More; John Raleigh; Charlie Rhodes; Slim Sallee; Harry Sullivan	Catchers: Coonie Blank; Jack Bliss; Roger Bresnahan; Ed Phelps; Infielders: Jap Barbeau; Bobby Byrne; Chappy Charles; Charlie Enwright; Billy Gilbert; Rudy Hulswitt; Ed Konetchy; Mike Mowrey; Champ Osteen; Tom Reilly; Alan Storke	Outfielders: Joe Delahanty; Rube Ellis; Steve Evans; Bert James; Howard Murphy; Al Shaw	Manager: Roger Bresnahan

== Player stats ==
=== Batting ===
==== Starters by position ====
Note: Pos = Position; G = Games played; AB = At bats; H = Hits; Avg. = Batting average; HR = Home runs; RBI = Runs batted in

Pos	Player	G	AB	H	Avg.	HR	RBI
C	Ed Phelps	104	306	76	.248	0	22
1B	Ed Konetchy	152	576	165	.286	4	80
2B	Chappy Charles	99	339	80	.236	0	29
SS	Rudy Hulswitt	82	289	81	.280	0	29
3B	Bobby Byrne	105	421	90	.214	1	33
OF	Steve Evans	143	498	129	.259	2	56
OF	Al Shaw	114	331	82	.248	2	34
OF	Rube Ellis	149	575	154	.268	3	46

==== Other batters ====
Note: G = Games played; AB = At bats; H = Hits; Avg. = Batting average; HR = Home runs; RBI = Runs batted in

Player	G	AB	H	Avg.	HR	RBI
Joe Delahanty	123	411	88	.214	2	54
Roger Bresnahan	72	234	57	.244	0	23
Jap Barbeau	48	175	44	.251	0	5
Alan Storke	48	174	49	.282	0	10
Jack Bliss	35	113	25	.221	1	8
Howard Murphy	25	60	12	.200	0	3
Champ Osteen	16	45	9	.200	0	7
Billy Gilbert	12	29	5	.172	0	1
Mike Mowrey	12	29	7	.241	0	4
Bert James	6	21	6	.286	0	0
Tom Reilly	5	7	2	.286	0	2
Charlie Enwright	3	7	1	.143	0	1
Coonie Blank	1	2	0	.000	0	0

=== Pitching ===
==== Starting pitchers ====
Note: G = Games pitched; IP = Innings pitched; W = Wins; L = Losses; ERA = Earned run average; SO = Strikeouts

Player	G	IP	W	L	ERA	SO
Fred Beebe	44	287.2	15	21	2.82	105
Johnny Lush	34	221.1	11	18	3.13	66
Slim Sallee	32	219.0	10	11	2.42	55
Bob Harmon	21	159.0	6	11	3.68	48
Les Backman	21	128.1	3	11	4.14	35
Charlie Rhodes	12	61.0	3	5	3.98	25

==== Other pitchers ====
Note: G = Games pitched; IP = Innings pitched; W = Wins; L = Losses; ERA = Earned run average; SO = Strikeouts

Player	G	IP	W	L	ERA	SO
John Raleigh	15	80.2	1	10	3.79	26
Eddie Higgins	16	66.0	3	3	4.50	15
Grover Lowdermilk	7	29.0	0	2	6.21	14
Irv Higginbotham	3	11.1	1	0	1.59	2
Harry Sullivan	2	1.0	0	0	36.00	1

==== Relief pitchers ====
Note: G = Games pitched; W = Wins; L = Losses; SV = Saves; ERA = Earned run average; SO = Strikeouts

Player	G	W	L	SV	ERA	SO
Steve Melter	23	0	1	3	3.50	24
Forrest More	15	1	5	0	5.04	17
Joe Bernard	1	0	0	0	0.00	2
