= Bettger =

Bettger is a surname. Notable people with the surname include:

- Frank Bettger (1888–1981), American baseball player and writer
- Lyle Bettger (1915–2003), American actor, son of Frank
