= Charlie Pickett =

Charlie Pickett may refer to:

- Charlie Pickett (pitcher) (1883–1969), American baseball pitcher
- Charlie Pickett (musician) (born 1953), American rock musician
