= Les Backman =

American baseball player (1888–1975)

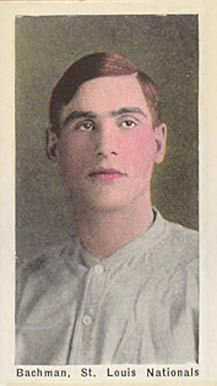
- Pitcher
- Born: March 20, 1888; Cleves, Ohio, U.S.
- Died: November 8, 1975 (aged 87); Cincinnati, Ohio, U.S.
- Batted: Right Threw: Right

MLB debut
- July 3, 1909, for the St. Louis Cardinals

Last MLB appearance
- August 28, 1910, for the St. Louis Cardinals

MLB statistics
- Win–loss record: 9–18
- Earned run average: 3.61
- Strikeouts: 76
- Stats at Baseball Reference

Teams
- St. Louis Cardinals (1909–1910)

Lester John Backman (March 20, 1888 – November 8, 1975) was a Major League Baseball pitcher who played for two seasons. He pitched for the St. Louis Cardinals for 21 games during the 1909 St. Louis Cardinals season and 26 games during the 1910 St. Louis Cardinals season.

He made his debut game in the Major League at the age of 21 on July 3, 1909. He played his last game at the age of 22 on August 28, 1910.
