= Bill Chambers (baseball) =

American baseball player (1888–1962)

- Pitcher
- Born: September 5, 1888; Cameron, West Virginia, U.S.
- Died: March 27, 1962 (aged 73); Fort Wayne, Indiana, U.S.
- Batted: Right Threw: Right

MLB debut
- July 11, 1910, for the St. Louis Cardinals

Last MLB appearance
- July 11, 1910, for the St. Louis Cardinals

MLB statistics
- Win–loss record: 0–0
- Earned run average: 0.00
- Strikeouts: 0
- Stats at Baseball Reference

Teams
- St. Louis Cardinals (1910)

William Christopher Chambers (September 5, 1888 – March 27, 1962) was an American professional baseball pitcher who played in one Major League game for the St. Louis Cardinals on July 11, 1910, pitching one inning, and allowing one unearned run.
