= Rube Geyer =

American baseball player (1884–1962)

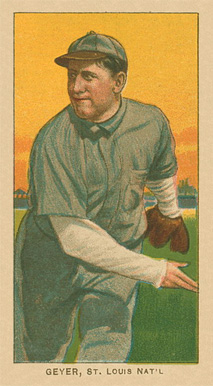
- Pitcher
- Born: March 26, 1884; Allegheny, Pennsylvania, U.S.
- Died: October 12, 1962 (aged 78); Wahkon, Minnesota, U.S.
- Batted: Right Threw: Right

MLB debut
- April 24, 1910, for the St. Louis Cardinals

Last MLB appearance
- September 4, 1913, for the St. Louis Cardinals

MLB statistics
- Win–loss record: 17–26
- Earned run average: 3.67
- Strikeouts: 133
- Stats at Baseball Reference

Teams
- St. Louis Cardinals (1910–1913)

Jacob Bowman "Rube" Geyer (March 26, 1884 – October 12, 1962) was an American Major League Baseball pitcher who played for the St. Louis Cardinals from 1910 to 1913. His key pitch was the drop ball.
