= Elmer Rieger =

American baseball player (1889–1959)

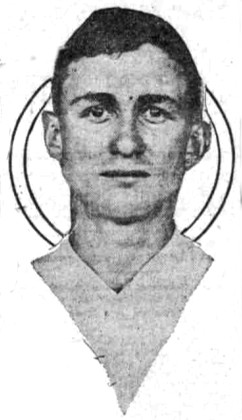
- Pitcher
- Born: February 25, 1889; Perris, California, U.S.
- Died: October 21, 1959 (aged 70); Los Angeles, California, U.S.
- Batted: Both Threw: Right

MLB debut
- April 20, 1910, for the St. Louis Cardinals

Last MLB appearance
- July 20, 1910, for the St. Louis Cardinals

MLB statistics
- Win–loss record: 0–2
- Earned run average: 5.48
- Strikeouts: 9
- Stats at Baseball Reference

Teams
- St. Louis Cardinals (1910)

Elmer Jay Rieger (February 25, 1889 – October 21, 1959) was an American Major League Baseball pitcher who played in 1910 with the St. Louis Cardinals. He batted right and left and threw right-handed. Rieger had a 0–2 record, with a 5.48 ERA, in 13 games, in his one-year career.

He was born in Perris, California and died in Los Angeles, California.
