= Frank Bettger =

American self-help book author (1888-1981)

- Infielder
- Born: February 15, 1888; Philadelphia, Pennsylvania, U.S.
- Died: November 27, 1981 (aged 93); Wynnewood, Pennsylvania, U.S.
- Batted: Both Threw: Right

MLB debut
- May 21, 1910, for the St. Louis Cardinals

Last MLB appearance
- October 13, 1910, for the St. Louis Cardinals

MLB statistics
- Batting average: .202
- Home runs: 0
- Runs batted in: 6
- Stats at Baseball Reference

Teams
- St. Louis Cardinals (1910)

Franklin Lyle Bettger (February 15, 1888 – November, 27, 1981), also known as Frank Betcher, was an American self-help book author and lecturer. He was a minor league baseball player and briefly played in the major leagues for the St. Louis Cardinals as a third baseman. He is the father of actor Lyle Bettger.

== Early life ==
Bettger was born on February 15, 1888. His birth name was Boettger but he removed the "o" from the spelling sometime in the 1900s. His father died when he was young and his mother was left to raise five children by herself. He attended James G. Blaine Grammar School in Philadelphia where he played baseball and football. He dropped out of school in the eighth grade to support his family. He worked as a plumber and steamfitter assistant and at the American Radiator Company.

== Baseball career ==
He continued to play baseball and joined a semi-pro team in Philadelphia. He began playing under the name Betcher. He claimed that it was initially an incorrect spelling of his last name on his contract that he did not correct. But he may have changed it himself for easier phonetic pronunciation as he began to get press coverage in the Philadelphia newspapers. He played shortstop for a team town in Bridgeton, New Jersey. In a game against a Red Donahue coached team, he impressed Donahue who convinced the Johnstown Johnnies in the Tri-State League to sign him for the 1907 season. He was coached by Charlie Atherton who kept him on the team despite a poor batting average. However, when Atherton was fired in May, the replacement coach, Tom Daly, released Bettger after just 12 games. Bettger later told the story that he asked the manager why he was demoted and was told that he lacked enthusiasm. Bettger told the manager: "I'm just trying to hide my nervousness." The manager advised: "Try something else. That's not working."

He continued to play semi-pro ball including with the Haverhill Hustlers in the New England League, the New Haven Blues in the Connecticut State League, and the Greenville Spinners in the Carolina Association. In 1910, he was signed with the St. Louis Cardinals and competed against Mike Mowrey and Jap Barbeau to play third base. He was recalled to the Cardinals in 1911 but he never showed for spring training and was ruled ineligible by the National Commission. He later gave conflicting reasons for not returning to the Cardinals, stating that he was "engaged in business" with his father-in-law and that he had hurt his arm. He continued to play semi-pro ball and was re-instated by the National Committee. He played for several minor league teams including the Montreal Royals in the International League and the Galveston Pirates in the Texas League. In 1913, he was hit by a pitch which broke his arm and he retired from professional baseball.

Bettger coached baseball at Swarthmore College from 1915 to 1919.

== Business career ==
He began selling life insurance for the Fidelity Mutual Life Insurance Co. of Pennsylvania but was not initially successful. He attended a motivational seminar by Dale Carnegie which he attributed to turning around his selling skills and by 1921 he was one of the top sales leaders at the company. He became a very successful salesman in the 1920s and 1930s. In 1939, he retired and traveled with Carnegie to provide lectures on sales techniques.

== Writing career ==
After succeeding in life insurance sales and becoming Top Salesman for 20 years with Fidelity Mutual, he met Dale Carnegie. Carnegie encouraged Bettger to write his first best-selling books: How I Raised Myself from Failure to Success in Selling and How I Multiplied My Income and Happiness in Selling. How I Raised Myself... was translated into over a dozen languages, including British English, Danish, Dutch, Finnish, French, German Hungarian, Italian, Japanese, Norwegian, Polish, Portuguese, Romanian, Russian, Serbian, Spanish, and Swedish. Bettger also gave a series of lectures to Jaycees organizations and to local chambers of commerce nationwide with Dale Carnegie.

== Later life ==
Bettger held insurance policies that would have benefited his wife after he died, but he lived into his 90s. Consequently, he and his wife outlived their assets. Members of the National Speakers Association contributed to help the couple meet their financial needs. After Frank died, Mrs. Bettger repaid the money from insurance proceeds. The money was then put into a fund dedicated to others in need, thus providing the original funding for the Professional Speakers Benefit Fund (PSBF). The mission of the PSBF is to help other members who may be indigent, face catastrophic health emergencies or losses, or outlive their assets.

He died on November 27, 1981, at his home in Wynnewood, Pennsylvania, and was interred at West Laurel Hill Cemetery in Bala Cynwyd, Pennsylvania.

== Personal life ==
He married Mertie Stetham in 1915. Their son Lyle Bettger became a film and television actor in the 1950s and 1960s. Bettger divorced his first wife in the 1940s and married Hazel Clara Warren. Together they had a daughter in 1946.

== In popular culture ==
In the Mad Men season 6 episode "A Tale of Two Cities" (2013, S06E10), enthusiastic account man Bob Benson is shown listening to a recording of one of Bettger's self-help books.

The book is also referenced in Whit Stillman's Barcelona as one of the books utilized by one of the main characters, a salesman.

== Publications ==
- How I Raised Myself from Failure to Success in Selling, New York: Prentice-Hall, 1940
- How One Idea Increased My Income and Happiness, New York: Dale Carnegie & Associates (New York), Inc., 1946
- Benjamin Franklin's Secret of Success and What it Did for Me, Prentice-Hall, 1960.
- How I Learned the Secrets of Success in Selling, Kingswood, Sussex: The World's Work, 1961
- How I Multiplied My Income and Happiness in Selling, Prentice-Hall, 1982.
