= Elmer Zacher =

American baseball player (1880–1944)

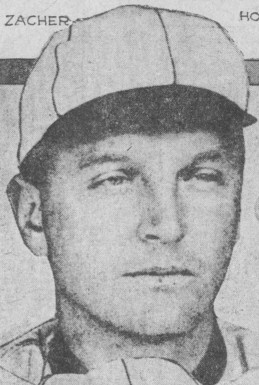
- Outfielder
- Born: September 17, 1880; Buffalo, New York, U.S.
- Died: December 20, 1944 (aged 64); Buffalo, New York, U.S.
- Batted: Right Threw: Right

MLB debut
- April 30, 1910, for the New York Giants

Last MLB appearance
- August 25, 1910, for the St. Louis Cardinals

MLB statistics
- Batting average: .212
- Home runs: 0
- Runs batted in: 10
- Stats at Baseball Reference

Teams
- New York Giants (1910); St. Louis Cardinals (1910)

Elmer Henry Zacher (September 17, 1880 – December 20, 1944) was an American professional baseball outfielder. Nicknamed "Silver", he played one season in Major League Baseball in 1910, appearing in one game for the New York Giants and 47 games for the St. Louis Cardinals.
