= Ody Abbott =

American baseball player (1888–1933)

- Outfielder
- Born: September 5, 1888; New Eagle, Pennsylvania, U.S.
- Died: April 13, 1933 (aged 44); Washington, D.C., U.S.
- Batted: Right Threw: Right

MLB debut
- September 10, 1910, for the St. Louis Cardinals

Last MLB appearance
- October 15, 1910, for the St. Louis Cardinals

MLB statistics
- Batting average: .186
- Home runs: 0
- Runs batted in: 6
- Stats at Baseball Reference

Teams
- St. Louis Cardinals (1910)

Ody Cleon Abbott (September 5, 1888 – April 13, 1933) was an American major league outfielder for the St. Louis Cardinals for one year in 1910. He attended the California State Normal School and Washington & Jefferson College.

He had a rather disappointing season, batting only .186 and striking out 20 out of 70 times. He played from September to October of that year.

He fought in World War I in the Army during 1918.
