= Roy Golden =

American baseball player (1888–1961)

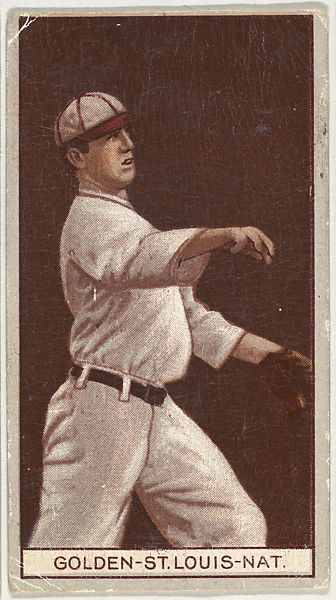
- Pitcher
- Born: July 12, 1888; Madisonville, Ohio
- Died: October 4, 1961 (aged 73); Norwood, Ohio
- Batted: Right Threw: Right

MLB debut
- September 7, 1910, for the St. Louis Cardinals

Last MLB appearance
- September 28, 1911, for the St. Louis Cardinals

MLB statistics
- Win–loss record: 6–12
- Earned run average: 4.89
- Strikeouts: 112
- Stats at Baseball Reference

Teams
- St. Louis Cardinals (1910–1911)

Roy Kramer Golden (July 12, 1888 – October 4, 1961) was a pitcher in Major League Baseball. He played for the St. Louis Cardinals.
