= Harry Patton =

American baseball player (1884–1930)

- Pitcher
- Born: June 29, 1884; Gillespie, Illinois, U.S.
- Died: June 9, 1930 (aged 45); St. Louis, Missouri, U.S.

MLB debut
- August 22, 1910, for the St. Louis Cardinals

Last MLB appearance
- August 22, 1910, for the St. Louis Cardinals

MLB statistics
- Win–loss record: 0–0
- Strikeouts: 2
- Earned run average: 2.25
- Stats at Baseball Reference

Teams
- St. Louis Cardinals (1910)

Harry Claud Patton (June 29, 1884 – June 9, 1930) was an American professional baseball pitcher. He played one game for the St. Louis Cardinals on August 22, 1910, pitching four innings.
