= Charlie Enwright =

American baseball player (1887–1917)

- Shortstop
- Born: October 6, 1887; Sacramento, California
- Died: January 19, 1917 (aged 29); Sacramento, California
- Batted: Left Threw: Right

MLB debut
- April 19, 1909, for the St. Louis Cardinals

Last MLB appearance
- April 22, 1909, for the St. Louis Cardinals

MLB statistics
- Batting average: .143
- Home runs: 0
- Runs batted in: 1
- Stats at Baseball Reference

Teams
- St. Louis Cardinals (1909)

Charles Massey Enwright (October 6, 1887 – January 19, 1917) was a shortstop in Major League Baseball.
