= Joe Bernard (baseball) =

American baseball player (1882–1960)

- Pitcher
- Born: March 24, 1882; Brighton, Illinois, U.S.
- Died: September 22, 1960 (aged 78); Springfield, Illinois, U.S.
- Batted: Right Threw: Right

MLB debut
- September 23, 1909, for the St. Louis Cardinals

Last MLB appearance
- September 23, 1909, for the St. Louis Cardinals

MLB statistics
- Win–loss record: 0–0
- Earned run average: 0.00
- Strikeouts: 2
- Stats at Baseball Reference

Teams
- St. Louis Cardinals (1909)

Joseph Carl Bernard (March 24, 1882 – September 22, 1960), nicknamed "J.C.", was an American right-handed pitcher in Major League Baseball who appeared in one game for the St. Louis Cardinals in 1909. He was 6 feet 1 inch (185 cm) and weighed 175 pounds (79 kg).
