= Cy Alberts =

American baseball player (1882–1917)

- Pitcher
- Born: January 14, 1882; Grand Rapids, Michigan, U.S.
- Died: August 27, 1917 (aged 35); Fort Wayne, Indiana, U.S.
- Batted: Right Threw: Right

MLB debut
- September 17, 1910, for the St. Louis Cardinals

Last MLB appearance
- October 12, 1910, for the St. Louis Cardinals

MLB statistics
- Win–loss record: 1–2
- Earned run average: 6.18
- Strikeouts: 10
- Stats at Baseball Reference

Teams
- St. Louis Cardinals (1910)

Frederick Joseph "Cy" Alberts (January 14, 1882 – August 27, 1917) was an American Major League Baseball pitcher who played in 1910 with the St. Louis Cardinals. He batted and threw right-handed. Alberts had a 1–2 record, with a 6.18 ERA, in four games, in his one-year career.

He was born in Grand Rapids, Michigan and died in Fort Wayne, Indiana.
