= Bill O'Hara (baseball) =

Canadian baseball player (1883–1931)

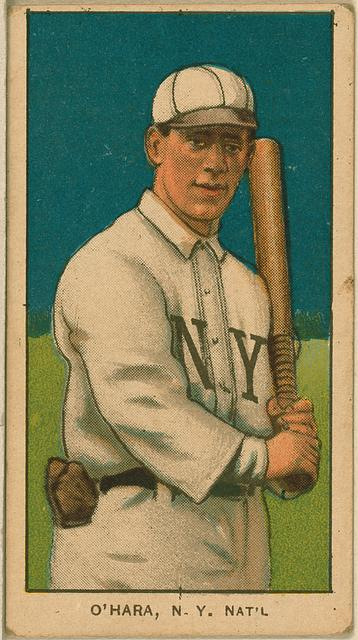
- Center fielder
- Born: August 14, 1883; Toronto, Ontario, Canada
- Died: June 13, 1931 (aged 47); Jersey City, New Jersey, U.S.
- Batted: Left Threw: Right

MLB debut
- April 15, 1909, for the New York Giants

Last MLB appearance
- May 8, 1910, for the St. Louis Cardinals

MLB statistics
- Batting average: .232
- Home runs: 1
- Runs batted in: 32
- Stats at Baseball Reference

Teams
- New York Giants (1909); St. Louis Cardinals (1910)

William Alexander O'Hara (August 14, 1883 – June 13, 1931) was a Canadian Major League Baseball outfielder. He started his professional baseball career in 1902 and played for the Baltimore Orioles from 1905 to 1908. He then played in the National League for the New York Giants and St. Louis Cardinals before finishing his career with the Toronto Maple Leafs.
