= Ernie Lush =

American baseball player (1885–1937)

- Outfielder
- Born: November 1, 1885; Bridgeport, Connecticut, U.S.
- Died: February 26, 1937 (aged 51); Detroit, Michigan, U.S.
- Batted: Right Threw: Left

MLB debut
- July 20, 1910, for the St. Louis Cardinals

Last MLB appearance
- July 20, 1910, for the St. Louis Cardinals

MLB statistics
- Games played: 1
- At bats: 4
- Hits: 0
- Stats at Baseball Reference

Teams
- St. Louis Cardinals (1910)

Ernest Benjamin Lush (November 1, 1885 – February 26, 1937) was an American outfielder in Major League Baseball. He played for the St. Louis Cardinals in 1910.
