= Bob Harmon =

American baseball player (1887–1961)

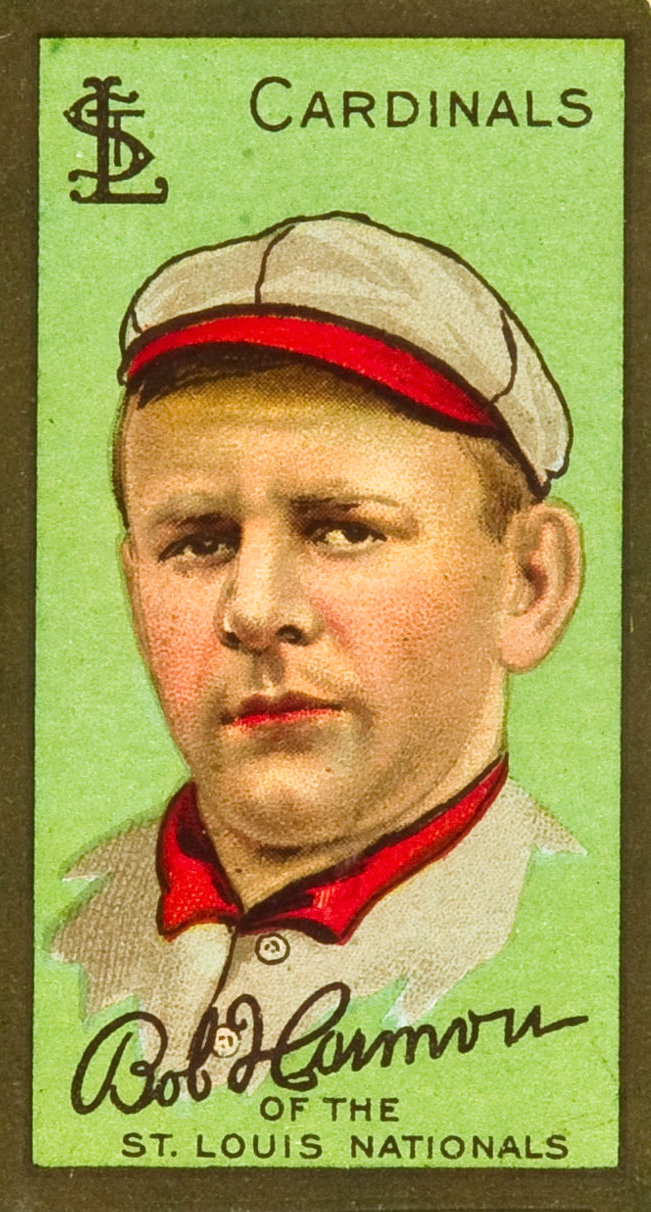
- Pitcher
- Born: October 15, 1887; Liberal, Missouri, U.S.
- Died: November 27, 1961 (aged 74); Monroe, Louisiana, U.S.
- Batted: Both Threw: Right

MLB debut
- June 23, 1909, for the St. Louis Cardinals

Last MLB appearance
- June 28, 1918, for the Pittsburgh Pirates

MLB statistics
- Win–loss record: 107–133
- Earned run average: 3.33
- Strikeouts: 634
- Stats at Baseball Reference

Teams
- St. Louis Cardinals (1909–1913); Pittsburgh Pirates (1914–1916, 1918)

Robert Green Harmon (October 15, 1887 – November 27, 1961) was an American Major League Baseball pitcher. He played nine seasons in the majors, between 1909 and 1918, for the St. Louis Cardinals and Pittsburgh Pirates.
