= Charlie Pickett (pitcher) =

American baseball player (1883–1969)

- Pitcher
- Born: March 1, 1883; Delaware, Ohio, U.S.
- Died: May 20, 1969 (aged 86); Springfield, Ohio, U.S.
- Batted: Right Threw: Right

MLB debut
- June 21, 1910, for the St. Louis Cardinals

Last MLB appearance
- June 24, 1910, for the St. Louis Cardinals

MLB statistics
- Win–loss record: 0-0
- Earned run average: 1.50
- Strikeouts: 2
- Stats at Baseball Reference

Teams
- St. Louis Cardinals (1910)

Charles Albert Pickett (March 1, 1883 – May 20, 1969) was an American pitcher in Major League Baseball. He played for the St. Louis Cardinals in 1910.
