= Jack Bliss =

American baseball player (1882–1968)

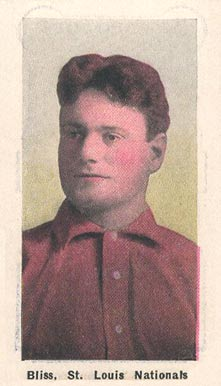
- Catcher
- Born: January 9, 1882; Vancouver, Washington Territory
- Died: October 23, 1968 (aged 86); Temple City, California, U.S.
- Batted: Right Threw: Right

MLB debut
- May 10, 1908, for the St. Louis Cardinals

Last MLB appearance
- September 30, 1912, for the St. Louis Cardinals

MLB statistics
- Batting average: .219
- Home runs: 3
- Runs batted in: 61
- Stats at Baseball Reference

Teams
- St. Louis Cardinals (1908–12)

John Joseph Albert Bliss (January 9, 1882 – October 23, 1968) was an American professional baseball player. He played all or part of five seasons in Major League Baseball, from 1908 until 1912, for the St. Louis Cardinals, primarily as a catcher. He spent most of his career as a reserve, but was the Cardinals' primary catcher in 1911.

== Sources ==
- Career statistics from Baseball Reference · Baseball Reference (Minors) · Retrosheet · Baseball Almanac
