= Rudy Hulswitt =

American baseball player (1877–1950)

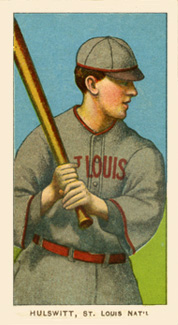
- Shortstop
- Born: February 23, 1877; Newport, Kentucky, U.S.
- Died: January 16, 1950 (aged 72); Louisville, Kentucky, U.S.
- Batted: Right Threw: Right

MLB debut
- June 16, 1899, for the Louisville Colonels

Last MLB appearance
- August 25, 1910, for the St. Louis Cardinals

MLB statistics
- Batting average: .253
- Home runs: 3
- Runs batted in: 203
- Stats at Baseball Reference

Teams
- Louisville Colonels (1899); Philadelphia Phillies (1902–1904); Cincinnati Reds (1908); St. Louis Cardinals (1909–1910)

Rudolph Edward Hulswitt (February 23, 1877 – January 16, 1950) was an American professional baseball player who played shortstop in the Major Leagues from 1899 to 1910. Hulswitt played for the Philadelphia Phillies, Cincinnati Reds, Louisville Colonels, and St. Louis Cardinals.
