= John Raleigh =

American baseball player (1887–1955)

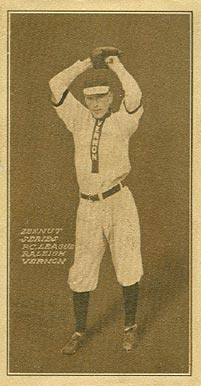
- Pitcher
- Born: April 21, 1887; Elkhorn, Wisconsin, U.S.
- Died: August 24, 1955; Escondido, California, U.S.
- Batted: Right Threw: Left

MLB debut
- August 4, 1909, for the St. Louis Cardinals

Last MLB appearance
- July 12, 1910, for the St. Louis Cardinals

MLB statistics
- Win–loss record: 1–10
- Earned run average: 4.10
- Strikeouts: 28
- Stats at Baseball Reference

Teams
- St. Louis Cardinals (1909–1910)

John Austin Raleigh (April 21, 1887 – August 24, 1955) was an American Major League Baseball pitcher. He played two seasons with the St. Louis Cardinals after having been purchased by the team from the Vernon Tigers of the Pacific Coast League.
