= Eddie Higgins (baseball) =

American baseball player (1888–1959)

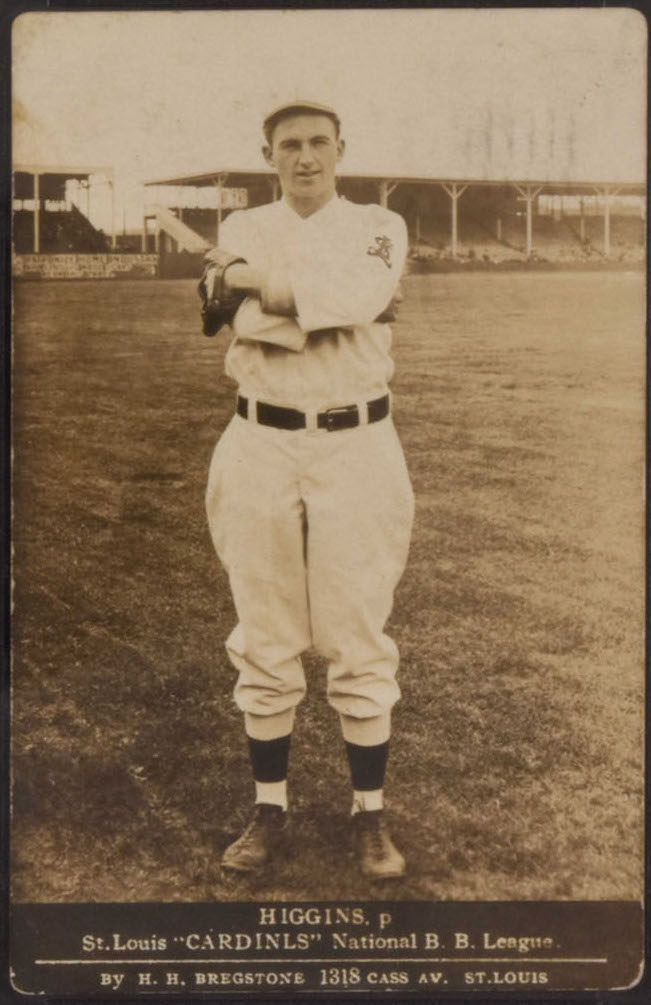
- Pitcher
- Born: March 18, 1888; Nevada, Illinois, U.S.
- Died: February 14, 1959 (aged 70); Elgin, Illinois, U.S.
- Batted: Right Threw: Right

MLB debut
- May 14, 1909, for the St. Louis Cardinals

Last MLB appearance
- July 31, 1910, for the St. Louis Cardinals

MLB statistics
- Win–loss record: 3–4
- Earned run average: 4.50
- Strikeouts: 16
- Stats at Baseball Reference

Teams
- St. Louis Cardinals (1909–10)

Thomas Edward Higgins (March 18, 1888 – February 14, 1959) was an American pitcher in Major League Baseball who played for the St. Louis Cardinals from 1909 to 1910.

== Sources ==
- Career statistics from Baseball Reference · Retrosheet · Baseball Almanac
