= Ed Phelps =

American baseball player (1879–1942)

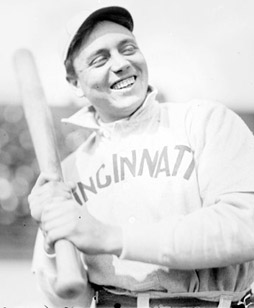
- Catcher
- Born: March 3, 1879; Albany, New York, U.S.
- Died: January 31, 1942 (aged 62); East Greenbush, New York, U.S.
- Batted: Right Threw: Right

MLB debut
- September 2, 1902, for the Pittsburgh Pirates

Last MLB appearance
- August 15, 1913, for the Brooklyn Dodgers

MLB statistics
- Batting average: .251
- Home runs: 3
- Runs batted in: 205
- Stats at Baseball Reference

Teams
- Pittsburgh Pirates (1902–1904); Cincinnati Reds (1905–1906); Pittsburgh Pirates (1906–1908); St. Louis Cardinals (1909–1910); Brooklyn Dodgers (1912–1913)

Edward Jaykill Phelps (March 3, 1879 – January 31, 1942) was an American professional baseball catcher. He played in Major League Baseball (MLB) for the Pittsburgh Pirates (1902–1904, 1906–1908), Cincinnati Reds (1905–1906), St. Louis Cardinals (1909–1910), and Brooklyn Dodgers (1912–1913).

Phelps was a player on the Pirates when they won the National League pennant in 1902 and 1903. In the inaugural World Series in 1903, he was the first player to strikeout, doing so in the first inning when facing Cy Young of the Boston Americans in Game 1. Phelps batted .231 with one RBI as the Pirates lost in eight games.

In 11 seasons, he played in 633 games and had 1,832 at-bats, 186 runs, 460 hits, 45 doubles, 20 triples, 3 home rns, 205 runs batted in (RBI), 31 stolen bases, 163 walks while ah having a slash-line of .251/.325/.302.

He died in East Greenbush, New York at the age of 62.

== Record ==
- MLB record for consecutive shutouts caught in the modern era - 6

== Sources ==
- Career statistics from Baseball Reference · Baseball Reference (Minors) · Retrosheet · Baseball Almanac
