= Jap Barbeau =

American baseball player (1882–1969)

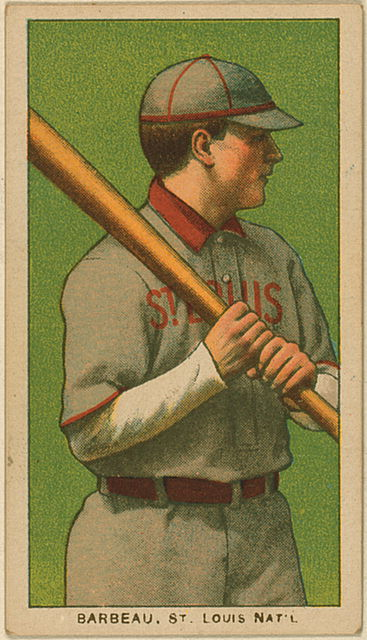
- Third baseman
- Born: June 10, 1882; New York, New York, U.S.
- Died: September 10, 1969 (aged 87); Milwaukee, Wisconsin, U.S.
- Batted: Right Threw: Right

MLB debut
- September 27, 1905, for the Cleveland Naps

Last MLB appearance
- May 2, 1910, for the St. Louis Cardinals

MLB statistics
- Batting average: .225
- Home runs: 0
- Runs batted in: 46
- Stats at Baseball Reference

Teams
- Cleveland Naps (1905–1906); Pittsburgh Pirates (1909); St. Louis Cardinals (1909–1910)

William Joseph "Jap" Barbeau (June 10, 1882 – September 10, 1969) was an American professional baseball infielder. He played in Major League Baseball for four seasons, primarily as a third baseman with the Cleveland Naps, Pittsburgh Pirates, and St. Louis Cardinals. Listed at 5 feet 5 inches (1.65 m) and 140 pounds (64 kg), he batted and threw right-handed.

== Career ==
Barbeau started his professional baseball career in the minor leagues in 1905, playing for the Columbus Senators of the American Association. In August, his contract was purchased by the major league Cleveland Naps and he spent the rest of 1905 and 1906 with them. However, he had a .194 batting average in 1906 and was released. Barbeau returned to the American Association, playing for the Toledo Mud Hens in 1907 and 1908.

In 1909, Barbeau was the starting third baseman for the Pittsburgh Pirates, and was then traded to the St. Louis Cardinals in August. After a slow start in 1910, he was sent back to American Association, where he played for the Kansas City Blues, Milwaukee Brewers, and St. Paul Saints over the next several seasons. He also played one season in the Pacific Coast League, and one season in the Western League, last playing professionally in 1919.

Overall, in parts of four major league seasons, Barbeau batted .225 in 199 games. In 13 minor league seasons, he appeared in over 1500 games while batting above .290 at least three times; his minor-league records are incomplete for some seasons.
