= 1911 St. Louis Cardinals season =

Major League Baseball season

1911 St. Louis Cardinals
- League: National League
- Ballpark: Robison Field
- City: St. Louis, Missouri
- Record: 75–74 (.503)
- League place: 5th
- Owners: Helene Hathaway Britton
- Managers: Roger Bresnahan

The 1911 St. Louis Cardinals season was the team's 30th season in St. Louis, Missouri and its 20th season in the National League. The Cardinals went 75–74 during the season and finished fifth in the National League.

== Regular season ==
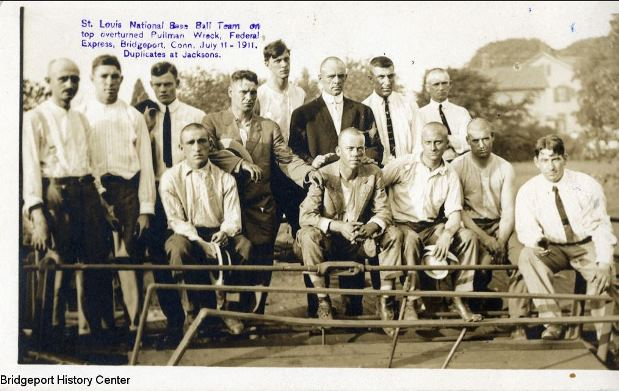
Team at the site of the Bridgeport train wreck; Roger Bresnahan is at front-right, seated

In the early hours of July 11, during the 1911 Eastern North America heat wave, the team was on a passenger train (the Federal Express) traveling to Boston when it derailed in Bridgeport, Connecticut. The Cardinals were on the last two cars of the train, which were the only cars not to overturn. The team was credited with assisting other passengers until help arrived; 14 passengers and crew members were killed in the incident.

=== Season standings ===
National League
Team	W	L	Pct.	GB	Home	Road
New York Giants	99	54	.647	—	49‍–‍25	50‍–‍29
Chicago Cubs	92	62	.597	7½	49‍–‍32	43‍–‍30
Pittsburgh Pirates	85	69	.552	14½	48‍–‍29	37‍–‍40
Philadelphia Phillies	79	73	.520	19½	42‍–‍34	37‍–‍39
St. Louis Cardinals	75	74	.503	22	36‍–‍38	39‍–‍36
Cincinnati Reds	70	83	.458	29	38‍–‍42	32‍–‍41
Brooklyn Trolley Dodgers	64	86	.427	33½	31‍–‍42	33‍–‍44
Boston Rustlers	44	107	.291	54	19‍–‍54	25‍–‍53

=== Record vs. opponents ===
1911 National League record Sources:
Team	BSN	BRO	CHC	CIN	NYG	PHI	PIT	STL
Boston	—	12–10–1	5–17	4–17–1	7–15	6–16	3–19	7–13–3
Brooklyn	10–12–1	—	13–9	11–11	5–16–1	8–13–1	14–8	9–11–1
Chicago	17–5	9–13	—	14–8–1	11–11	15–7	10–12	16–6–2
Cincinnati	17–4–1	11–11	8–14–1	—	8–14	10–12	10–12–1	6–16–3
New York	15–7	16–5–1	11–11	14–8	—	12–10	16–6	15–7
Philadelphia	16–6	13–8–1	7–15	12–10	10–12	—	13–9	8–13
Pittsburgh	19–3	14–8	12–10	12–10–1	6–16	9–13	—	13–9
St. Louis	13–7–3	11–9–1	6–16–2	16–6–3	7–15	13–8	9–13	—

=== Notable transactions ===
- June 1911: Joe Willis was purchased by the Cardinals from the St. Louis Browns.

=== Roster ===
1911 St. Louis Cardinals
Roster
Pitchers: Harry Camnitz; Gene Dale; Rube Geyer; Roy Golden; Bob Harmon; Bunny Hearn; Grover Lowdermilk; Lou Lowdermilk; Jack McAdams; Roy Radebaugh; Jack Reis; Slim Sallee; Pete Standridge; Bill Steele; Joe Willis; Gene Woodburn; George Zackert; Ed Zmich	Catchers: Jack Bliss; Roger Bresnahan; Ivey Wingo; Infielders: Ed Conwell; Arnold Hauser; Miller Huggins; Ed Konetchy; Lee Magee; Dan McGeehan; Hap Morse; Mike Mowrey; Wally Smith	Outfielders: Jim Clark; Rube Ellis; Steve Evans; Frank Gilhooley; Otto McIvor; Rebel Oakes; Denney Wilie; Other batters: Milt Reed	Manager: Roger Bresnahan

== Player stats ==
=== Batting ===
==== Starters by position ====
Note: Pos = Position; G = Games played; AB = At bats; H = Hits; Avg. = Batting average; HR = Home runs; RBI = Runs batted in

Pos	Player	G	AB	H	Avg.	HR	RBI
C	Jack Bliss	97	258	59	.229	1	27
1B	Ed Konetchy	158	571	165	.289	6	88
2B	Miller Huggins	138	509	133	.261	1	24
SS	Arnold Hauser	136	515	124	.241	3	46
3B	Mike Mowrey	137	471	126	.268	0	61
OF	Steve Evans	154	547	161	.294	5	71
OF	Rebel Oakes	154	551	145	.263	2	59
OF	Rube Ellis	155	555	139	.250	2	66

==== Other batters ====
Note: G = Games played; AB = At bats; H = Hits; Avg. = Batting average; HR = Home runs; RBI = Runs batted in

Player	G	AB	H	Avg.	HR	RBI
Roger Bresnahan	81	227	63	.278	3	41
Wally Smith	81	194	42	.216	2	19
Lee Magee	26	69	18	.261	0	8
Otto McIvor	30	62	14	.226	1	9
Ivey Wingo	25	57	12	.211	0	3
Denney Wilie	28	51	12	.235	0	3
Jim Clark	14	18	3	.167	0	3
Dan McGeehan	3	9	2	.222	0	1
Hap Morse	4	8	0	.000	0	0
Milt Reed	1	1	0	.000	0	0
Ed Conwell	1	1	0	.000	0	0
Frank Gilhooley	1	0	0	----	0	0

=== Pitching ===
==== Starting pitchers ====
Note: G = Games pitched; IP = Innings pitched; W = Wins; L = Losses; ERA = Earned run average; SO = Strikeouts

Player	G	IP	W	L	ERA	SO
Bob Harmon	51	348.0	23	16	3.13	144
Bill Steele	43	287.1	18	19	3.73	115
Slim Sallee	36	245.0	15	9	2.76	74
Roy Golden	30	148.2	4	9	5.02	81
Joe Willis	2	15.0	0	1	4.20	5

==== Other pitchers ====
Note: G = Games pitched; IP = Innings pitched; W = Wins; L = Losses; ERA = Earned run average; SO = Strikeouts

Player	G	IP	W	L	ERA	SO
Rube Geyer	29	148.2	9	6	3.27	46
Lou Lowdermilk	16	65.0	3	4	3.46	20
Gene Woodburn	11	38.1	1	5	5.40	23
Grover Lowdermilk	11	33.1	0	1	7.29	15
Gene Dale	5	14.2	0	2	6.75	13
Roy Radebaugh	2	10.0	0	0	2.70	1
George Zackert	4	7.1	0	2	11.05	6

==== Relief pitchers ====
Note: G = Games pitched; W = Wins; L = Losses; SV = Saves; ERA = Earned run average; SO = Strikeouts

Player	G	W	L	SV	ERA	SO
Jack McAdams	6	0	0	0	3.72	4
Ed Zmich	4	1	0	0	2.13	4
Jack Reis	3	0	0	0	0.96	4
Pete Standridge	2	0	0	0	9.64	3
Bunny Hearn	2	0	0	0	13.50	1
Harry Camnitz	2	1	0	0	0.00	2
