= Winston-Salem Twins (1905–1942) =

- 1905–1942; (1905, 1908–1917, 1920–1933, 1937–1942); Winston-Salem, North Carolina

Minor league affiliations
- Class: Class D (1905, 1908–1917, 1920); Class C (1921–1931); Class B (1932–1933, 1937–1942)
- League: Virginia-North Carolina League (1905); Carolina Association (1908–1912); North Carolina State League (1913–1917); Piedmont League (1920–1933, 1937–1942)

Major league affiliations
- Team: New York Giants (1932); Detroit Tigers (1937); Brooklyn Dodgers (1938); Cleveland Indians (1939); Detroit Tigers (1941–1942)

Minor league titles
- League titles (4): 1911; 1913; 1914; 1928
- Conference titles (1): 1925
- Wild card berths (1): 1925

Team data
- Name: Winston-Salem Twins
- Ballpark: Prince Albert Park / South Side Park

The Winston-Salem Twins were a long running minor league baseball team based in Winston-Salem, North Carolina. The first "Twins" team played as members of the 1905 Virginia–North Carolina League. The Winston-Salem Twins teams played in the minor leagues in the Carolina Association from 1908 to 1912 and the North Carolina State League from 1913 to 1917. The Twins had two tenures in the Piedmont League from 1920 to 1933 and again from 1937 to 1942.

The Twins won league championships in 1911, 1913, 1914, and 1928. The team's second tenure in the Piedmont League ended with six consecutive last place finishes from 1937 to 1942.

The long running "Twins" nickname reflected the two neighboring cities that first shared the franchise in partnership: Salem and Winston, North Carolina. The Twins played several seasons before the two cities merged to officially become Winston-Salem, North Carolina in 1913.

The Twins were a minor league affiliate of the New York Giants (1932), Detroit Tigers (1937, 1941–1942), Brooklyn Dodgers (1938), and Cleveland Indians (1939).

For their duration from 1904 to 1942, the Twins played home games at the parcel that contained Prince Albert Park.

The Twins were preceded in minor league play by one team in 1892. The 1892 Winston-Salem "Blue Sluggers" played a short season as charter members of the South Atlantic League.

Following World War II, the Winston-Salem Twins were succeeded by a new franchise that resumed minor league play as new members of the Carolina League. The 1945 team in the Carolina League played as the Winston-Salem Cardinals from 1945 to 1953. The "Twins" nickname returned from 1954 to 1956, before Winston-Salem played under other nicknames as the franchise continued its long tenure in the Carolina League that lasted through 2020. Since 1945, the franchise has had continuous play, evolving to become today's Winston-Salem Dash of the South Atlantic League.

== History ==
=== 1892: South Atlantic League / First minor league season ===
The cities of Winston and Salem first hosted minor league baseball in 1892, when the Winston-Salem "Blue Sluggers" played the season as charter members of the four-team South Atlantic League. The 1892 team was also referred to as the Winston Hornets or Winston Blue Sluggers. The Charleston Sea Gulls, Charlotte Hornets, and Columbia Senators joined Winston-Salem in the independent league.

In 1892, the cities of Winston, North Carolina and Salem, North Carolina were two separate neighboring cities and not yet officially formed as the one "Winston-Salem" city, although there was unity and partnership between the two cities. In 1913, a merger officially occurred after a public vote endorsed the forming of the new single city structure and name.

The South Atlantic League regular season schedule began on April 30, 1892. The league was short-lived and folded on June 10 after playing less than two months of the season. When the league folded, the Blue Sluggers were in second place with an 18–14 record. The Blue Sluggers were managed during their brief season by both William Maroney and Edward "Pop" Tate. In the final standings, the Charleston Seagulls finished in first place with a 20–13 record, finishing 1 1/2 games ahead of second place Winston-Salem.

At age 31, catcher Pop Tate came to Winston-Salem after playing the 1891 season for the Lebanon Cedars in the Eastern Association. In his major league career, Tate played in 227 games for the Boston Beaneaters (1885–1888) and Baltimore Orioles (1889–1890), batting .218. In 1926, Tate Field in Pop Tate's home town of Richmond, Virginia was renamed in his honor.

In 2021, the Winston-Salem Dash franchise rejoined the South Atlantic League, 129 years after the region hosted a team in the first version of the league.

=== 1905: First Winston-Salem Twins team ===
After a 12-season absence from minor league baseball, Winston-Salem resumed play during the 1905 season. The 1905 Virginia–North Carolina League began the season playing as a four-team Class D level league. The Charlotte Hornets, Danville Tobacconists, Greensboro Farmers, and the Salisbury-Spencer Twins teams were the league members to begin the season. In the era, the Class D level was the equivalent of today's Class A level leagues, and minor league teams did not have direct affiliations with major league teams.

The Salisbury-Spencer Twins team, which represented the neighboring cities of Salisbury and Spencer, North Carolina were members of the Virginia-North Carolina League to begin the 1905 season, before Salisbury-Spencer uniquely relocated to another two-city region of North Carolina. On July 17, 1905, the Salisbury-Spencer Twins team moved to the twin cities of Winston, North Carolina and Salem, North Carolina, playing its first game at Fairview Park on July 19. The team kept the "Twins" nickname, first coined in Salisbury-Spencer, after the relocation. The team finished the 1905 season known as the "Winston-Salem Twins" for the first time.

The Salisbury-Spencer Twins team began the season with Con Strouthers as manager. The previous season, Strouthers had served as the manager of the Augusta Tourists team of the South Atlantic League. With Augusta in 1904, Strouthers signed charter Hall of Fame member Ty Cobb to his first professional contract. In late May 1905, Earle Holt became the Twins' player-manager, replacing Strouthers prior to the relocation. Holt played professionally through 1909 and managing in the minor leagues through the 1911 season.

At the time of their relocation, the Salisbury-Spencer Twins had compiled a 32–60 record before the move to Winston-Salem on July 17, 1905. On August 19, the Virginia–North Carolina League folded. The Twins had compiled a 10–14 record while based in Winston-Salem. The Twins had compiled an overall final record of 42–74 at the time the league folded, ending the season while playing under managers Strouthers and Holt. The Twins finished their shortened season in third place, ending the season 14.5 games behind the first place Danville Tobacconists.

=== 1908–1912: Carolina Association / 1911 championship ===
After a two-season hiatus, Winston-Salem resumed minor league play in 1908, becoming known again as the Winston-Salem "Twins." The Winston-Salem Twins became a charter member of the Carolina Association, which began play as a six–team Class D level league in the 1908 season. The Anderson Electricians and Greenville Spinners and Spartanburg Spartans teams left the South Carolina League to join the new league. The Charlotte Hornets of Charlotte, North Carolina, Greensboro Patriots of Greenville, South Carolina and Winston-Salem Twins teams joined with the three others beginning league play on April 30, 1908. The six teams remained intact together for the five-season duration of the league. In 1892, Winston, North Carolina and Salem, North Carolina were separate neighboring cities. In 1905, Winston, North Carolina and Salem, North Carolina remained as separate neighboring cities, before the merging of the two cities in 1913.

Robert "Bobby" Carter was hired as the Winston-Salem Twins' manager for the 1908 season. Carter had been the player-manager for the Memphis Egyptians in the Southern Association for two seasons prior to joining Winston-Salem.

On June 12, 1908, the storied Shoeless Joe Jackson played for the Greenville Spinners against the Twins in a home game at Winston-Salem. In the first game of a three-game series, there were 800 in attendance as Jackson hit a home run and a triple in an 8–2 Greenville victory over the Twins. Jackson captured the Carolina Association batting title with the Greenville Spinners, batting .346 with a league leading 72 RBIs and 120 total hits. Playing for his hometown team, Jackson acquired his "Shoeless" nickname from the local newspaper in 1908 after playing barefoot in a game because his new baseball shoes weren't broken in and injured his feet.

The Winston-Salem Twins ended the 1908 season in fourth place in the new league's first season of play and the 1908 Carolina Association played a regular season without playoffs, which was common in the era. The 1908 Carolina Association final standings were led by the Greensboro Patriots and manager James McKivitt, who ended their season with a 51–38 record and were followed by the Greenville Spinners (48–36), Spartanburg, Winston-Salem Twins (41–48), Charlotte Hornets (40–47) and Anderson Electricians (32–53) in the final standings. With their fourth-place finish and 41–48 record, Winston-Salem ended the 1908 season 10.0 games behind first place Greensboro. Playing in 94 games for the Twins, player-manager Bobby Carter batted .317 with 41 stolen bases for the Winston-Salem.

With Bobby Carter returning as manager in 1909, the Winston-Salem Twins continued play in the Carolina Association and ended the season in fourth place in the final standings of the six-team Class D level league. For the second consecutive season, the Greensboro Champs (65–44) won the league title. Greensboro was followed in the standings by the second place Anderson Electricians (63–48), Winston-Salem Twins (54–52), Greenville Spinners and last place Spartanburg Spartans. With a final record of 54–52, the Twins ended the season 9.5 games behind first place Greensboro in the final standings as no playoffs were held.

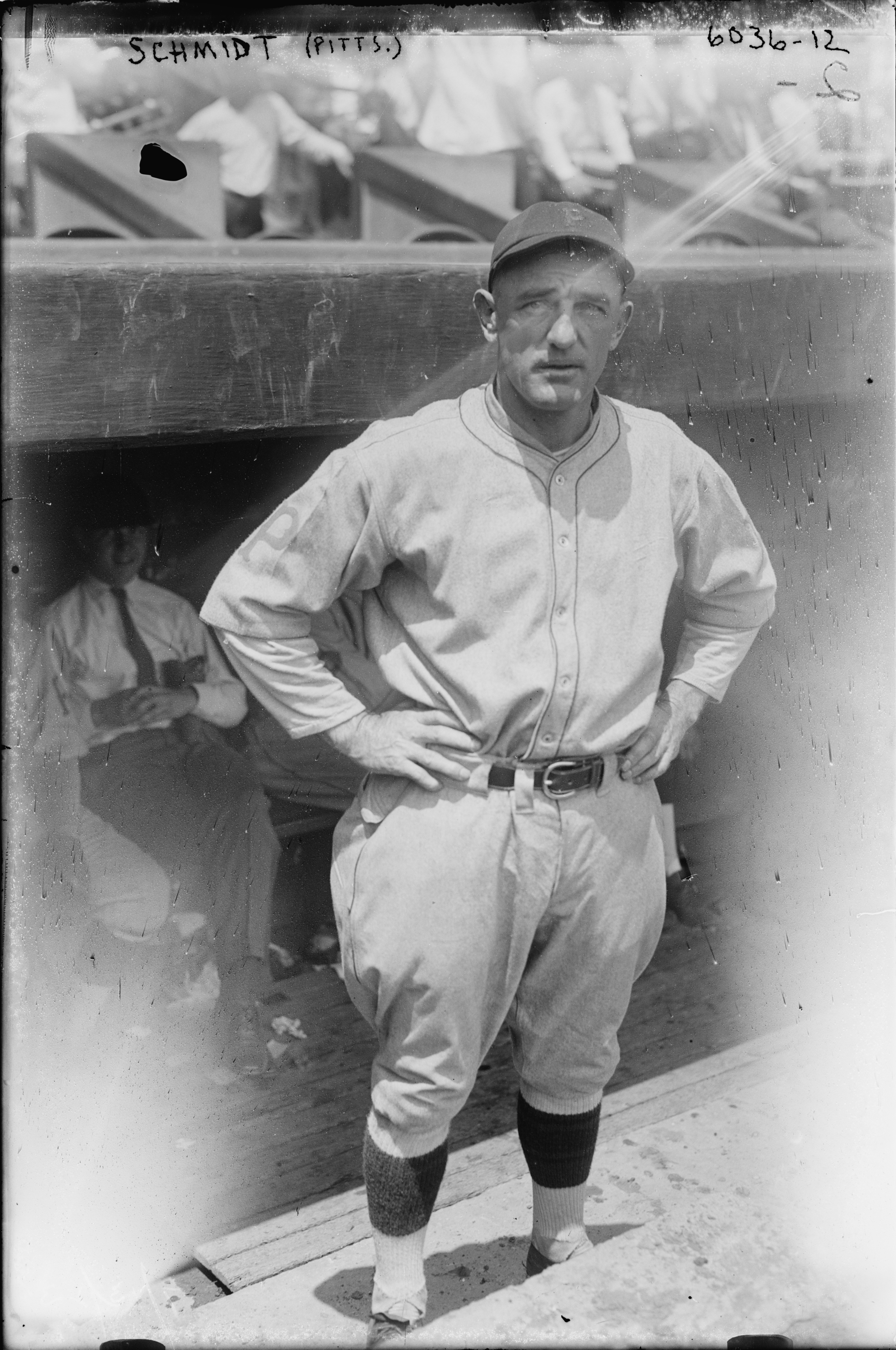
(1923) Walter Schmidt, Pittsburgh Pirates. Schmidt played catcher for the Twins in 1909 before embarking his 10-season major league career.

Catcher Walter Schmidt played for the Twins in 1909, batting .260 for Winston-Salem in 89 games at age 22. After continuing play in the minor leagues upon leaving Winston-Salem, Schmidt did not begin his major league career until age 29. Schmidt played with the Pittsburgh Pirates (1916–1924) and St. Louis Cardinals (1925). Appearing in 766 major league games in 10 seasons, Schmidt had a .257 batting average, with 3 total career home runs, 234 RBIs and 57 stolen bases.

Schmidt's backup with Winston-Salem, catcher Bill Fetzer played for the 1909 Twins, batting .211 in his 40 games for Winston-Salem. Fetzer later embarked on a collegiate coaching career, serving as a college football, basketball, and baseball coach. He served as the head football coach at Davidson College (1915–1918), North Carolina State University (1919–1920), and the University of North Carolina at Chapel Hill (1921–1925), compiling a career college football record of 61–28–7. Fetzer also was the head basketball coach at Davidson for two seasons, from 1916 to 1918, coaching the team to a record of 18–11. In addition, he coached baseball at Davidson (1915–1919), North Carolina State (1920), and North Carolina (1921–1925), compiling a career college baseball coaching record of 128–75–5.

Pitcher Billy Laval played for the Winston-Salem Twins in both the 1909 and 1910 seasons, pitching to an 8–5 record for the Twins in 1910 at age 25. Laval became a rival manager in the Carolina Association following his two seasons pitching for the Twins. Laval had a lengthy tenure as a collegiate coach in football, basketball and baseball that overlapped with his professional baseball seasons. Laval was an athletic director and college baseball, college football, and college basketball coach. He held head coaching positions at Furman University (1914–1927), the University of South Carolina (1928–1934), Emory and Henry College (1936–1937), and Newberry College (1938–1950). Immediately following his two seasons pitching for the Twins, Laval began a two-season tenure as the player-manager of the Spartanburg Spartans, remaining in the Carolina Association.

James McKivitt became the Twins' manager in 1910. After winning Carolina Association championships the prior two seasons as manager of the Greensboro Champs, the 1910 season was the final professional season for McKivitt at age 40. McKivitt had been the player-manager with Greensboro the previous two seasons, leading the team to the 1908 and 1909 titles.

Continuing Carolina Association minor league play in the 1910 season, the Winston-Salem Twins remained as a member of the six-team league. With James McKivitt as manager, the Winston-Salem Twins placed fourth in the Class D level league's final standings. The Greenville Spinners (63–40) were the 1910 Carolina Association champions and finished 14.5 games ahead of Winston-Salem. The Twins were ended the season with a 50–57 record. Following first place Greenville in the standings were the second place Charlotte Hornets (56–50), Anderson Electricians (56–54), Winston-Salem, Spartanburg and McKivitt's former team, the Greensboro Champs who finished in last place after his departure. As a part-time first basemen for the Twins in 1910, player/manager James McKivitt batted .095 in 22 games and 84 at-bats.

As the Twins continued minor league play, at age 32 Charles Clancy was named as the Winston-Salem Twins manager for the 1911 Carolina Association season. Clancy would have a long tenure of affiliation with the Twins. At the time of his hiring in 1911, Clancy was also serving as the head coach of the North Carolina Tar Heels baseball team at the University of North Carolina, managing professionally after the conclusion of the collegiate season. Clancy coached the Tar Heels in the spring of 1911 and would manage at North Carolina in 1912 as well, compiling a 26-14 record in his collegiate tenure. At the minor league level, Clancy game to Winston-Salem after having served two seasons as the player-manager of the Fayetteville Highlanders of the Class D level Eastern Carolina League in 1909 and 1910. Clancy did not play following the 1910 season. Clancy would serve 10 seasons as the Winston-Salem Twins' manager over three separate stints covering 28 years in duration. Clancy had testified in front of a committee in 1913 that he had signed Olympian Jim Thorpe to his professional baseball team in 1909 and 1910, leading to Thorpe losing his amateur status and being stripped of his Olympic Gold medals from the 1912 Olympic Games.

With Charles Clancy as manager the 1900 Winston-Salem Twin swon the Carolina Association championship, finishing first in the final regular season standings to claim the first professional baseball title for Winston-Salem. The Twins finished the season with a record of 72–37, ending the season 6.0 games ahead of the second place Greensboro Partiots (66–43) in the final standings of the Class D level league. The third place Charlotte Hornets (52–58), Anderson Electricians (48–59), Spartanburg Spartans (44–63) and Greenville Spinners (42–64) teams rounded out the 1911 final Carolina Association standings for the six-team league. player-manager John Clancy hit .337 in 102 games for Winston-Salem, playing shortstop. Twins pitcher Josh Swindell compiled a monumental 29–8 record pitching for the Twins in 37 games. Winston-Salem's Bill Schumacker led the Carolina Association with both 145 total hits and 91 runs scored. After his pitching performance with the Twins in 1911, Josh Swindell made his major league debut with the 1911 Cleveland Naps, where he had a 2.08 ERA in four appearances with Cleveland.

The 1912 season was the final season for the Carolina Association, as the Twins sought to defend their championship from the prior season. On May 31, 1912, Winston-Salem Twins pitcher Carl Ray threw complete game victories in both games of a double header against the Charlotte Hornets.

Playing the 1912 season under returning manager Charles Clancy, the defending champion Winston-Salem Twins placed second in the Class D level Carolina Association's final season of play. Winston-Salem concluded the season with a 63–47 record and the Twins ended the season 3.0 games behind the 1912 Carolina Association champion Anderson Electricians, who won the title with their final record of 66–44. In the final standings of the six-team league, Anderson and Winston-Salem were followed by the third place Charlotte Hornets (61–46), Spartanburg Red Sox, Greensboro Patriots (51–59) and Greenville Spinners (34–78). Returning to the Twins, Bill Schumacker led the Carolina Association with both 16 home runs and 106 RBIs and his 125 total hits and 73 runs scored also lead the Carolina Association. Twins' pitcher Pete Boyle led the Carolina Association with 16 wins.

Following the conclusion of the 1912 season, the Carolina Association permanently folded. With three members continuing play, the league partially evolved to become the Class D level North Carolina State League. The Anderson, Greenville and Spartanburg franchises did not continue play in the newly formed league.

=== 1913–1914: North Carolina State League: two championships ===
In the 1913 season, the Winston-Salem Twins continued minor league play in a new league. The Twins became a charter member of the six-team Class D level North Carolina State League. The North Carolina State League, was formed after the Spartanburg, Greenville and Anderson South Carolina based franchises did not continue in play after their tenure in the Carolina Association. With the three South Carolina based franchises folded, the North Carolina State League formed with the three North Carolina based Carolina Association franchises as members. The Charlotte, Greensboro and Winston-Salem franchises from the Carolina Association joined with the Asheville Mountaineers, Durham Bulls and Raleigh Capitals teams in the forming the new six-team league. The North Carolina State League began its first season of play on April 24, 1913.

The neighboring cities Winston, North Carolina and Salem, North Carolina officially merged to become one city on May 13, 1913. An earlier attempted merger of the two cities had occurred in 1879 but the merger was unsuccessful because the proposed name of "Salem" caused the residents of Winston to withdraw their support for the merger. Shortly after, the local post offices were renamed to "Winston-Salem" to reflect the closeness and unity of the two cities.

On April 28, 1913, Twins' pitcher Carl Ray, a North Carolina native threw a no hitter for the Twins against the Durham Bulls in a game at Durham. Ray struck out 11 Durham hitters in the Twins' victory.

In their first season playing in the new league, the 1913 Winston-Salem Twins won the North Carolina State League championship, with their manager remaining with the team. With Charles Clancy continuing his tenure as the Winston-Salem manager in the new league, the Twins ended the season with a record of 66–49 to finish in first place and claim the league title. No North Carolina State League playoffs were held and the Twins became league champions. The Twins finished just 0.5 game ahead of second place Durham Bulls 65–49 in the final North Carolina State League standings. In his third season with Winston-Salem, first baseman Bill Schumacher led the North Carolina League with his 18 home runs and 130 total hits on the season. Twins' pitcher J.R. Lee led the North Carolina State League pitchers with both 25 wins and 199 strikeouts. In their championship season, the Twins also received strong seasons from catcher Harry Smith, who batted .273 with 8 home runs in 117 games and outfielder Luke Stuart, who hit .266 with 11 home runs in 105 games. Along with Lee's 25–14 season, Carl Ray had a 11–9 pitching record, Charlie Harding finished 12–6 and Pete Boyle was 16-14.

The 1914 Winston-Salem Twins defended their North Carolina State League championship by winning their second consecutive championship. The Twins won the title with a first-place finish in another close race in the league standings. The Twins ended the regular season with a record of 70–47, with a second consecutive first-place finish, winning again under manager Charles Clancy. Winston-Salem won the championship by just .005 percentage points over the second place Charlotte Hornets who had a 72–49 record to finish with a .593 percentage to .598 for the Twins. No North Carolina State League playoff was held following the season. Winston-Salem outfielder Buck Roberts batted .307 with 19 stolen bases and scored 83 runs for the Twins. Winston-Salem Twins outfielder Jim Hickman led the North Carolina State League with 20 home runs. pitcher Carl Ray was dominant for the Twins, leading the league with both 28 wins and 317 strikeouts in 50 games 372 innings pitched. Helping the Twins with strong performances in their championship season, George Gates hit 14 home runs while batting .245, August Schroder batted .301 with 35 stolen bases and Ray Rolling batted .262 with 34 doubles and 29 stolen bases.

=== 1915–1917: North Carolina State League ===
After winning the previous two North Carolina State League championships, the 1915 Winston-Salem Twins finished near the bottom of the league standings. Continuing play in the six-team Class D level North Carolina State League, the Twins ended the season in fifth place. Finishing with a record of 53–69 under manager Charles Clancy, the Winston-Salem Twins ended the 1915 season 22.0 games behind the first place Asheville Mountaineers in the final standings. No playoffs were held, but the North Carolina State League had adopted a split season schedule for the 1915 season, which could have resulted in a playoff. As the Asheville Mountaineers won both of the half-season pennants, this negated an opponent for a playoff and awarded the title to Asheville. Winston-Salem outfielder Turner Barber won the North Carolina State League batting title, hitting .324 on the season. Barber played for Winston-Salem in his first professional season at age 21 and after playing in 92 games for the Twins, he made his major league debut. Barber left the Twins and played in 20 games for the 1915 Washington Senators, hitting .302. Barber played in the major leagues with the Washington Senators (1915–1916), Chicago Cubs (1917–1922) and Brooklyn Robins (1923) before continuing to play in the minor leagues, playing through the 1930 season. In his major league career, Turner compiled a .289 batting average (442-for-1531) with 2 home runs and 185 RBIs in 491 games.

First baseman Ted Jourdan played for the 1915 Winston-Salem Twins, batting .258 in 58 games at age 19 for the Twins before making his major league debut the next season. Jourdan became a member of the 1917 World Series champion Chicago White Sox, playing with the White Sox from 1916 to 1918 and 1920, batting .214 in him major league career. Jourdan played in the minor leagues for 14 seasons through 1931, batting .294 in 1,445 games.

During the 1916 season, on August 30, 1916, the Asheville Tourists and Winston-Salem Twins played a North Carolina State League game at Oates Park in Asheville. The game was noteworthy because the entire 9-inning game was played in a total of 31 minutes. The Twins won the game 2-1 in front of a crowd of 200 at Oates Park. The game was allegedly played so quickly because the game didn't affect the teams' position in the standings and both teams also had trains to catch for their next games. Asheville was headed to Raleigh and the Twins were going home to Winston-Salem after the game. Winston-Salem manager Charley Clancy and Asheville manager Jack Corbett agreed to begin the game early and the contest started at 1:28 PM instead of the scheduled 2:00 PM. The first three innings of the game were played without an official league umpire because umpire Red Rowe arrived at 1:40PM, not knowing of the managers' decision to spontaneously change the starting time. After the final out in the game was made at 1:59PM, the Asheville team boarded the 2:30 train to Raleigh. The Asheville fans in attendance were refunded their admission fee if they desired, due to the circumstances of the game.

The Twins were the runner-up in the 1916 North Carolina State League season in the overall standings. Ending the season with an overall record of 63–48, the Twins finished in second place overall playing under manager Charles Clancy, who continued his tenure in leading the Twins. Winston-Salem ended the season 4.5 games behind the first-place Charlotte Hornets in the overall North Carolina State League regular season standings. However, with the North Carolina State league continuing with a split season schedule, the Twins did not qualify for the playoff, as the Asheville Tourists won the first half schedule pennant and Charlotte won the second half pennant. The two pennant winners them met in the playoff series, where Charlotte then swept Asheville in four games in the series to win the championship. Winston-Salem Twins player Hob Hiller won the league batting title, hitting .325. Pitchers Herman Schwartje led the league with 183 strikeouts and Whitey Glazner had a 21-7 record to lead the league in win percentage of .750.

After pitching 9 games for the Twins in 1915, Whitey Glazner returned to pitch again for Winston-Salem in 1916, compiling his 21-win season. Pitched in the major leagues for the Pittsburgh Pirates (1920–1923), Philadelphia Phillies (1923–1924), compiling a record of 41–48, with a 4.21 ERA in 146 career games with 46 complete games.

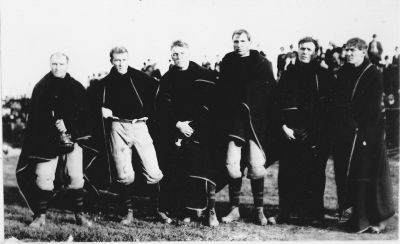
(1920) The Nesser Brothers. (L–R) Ted, John, Frank Nesser, Fred, Phil, Al Frank Nesser batted .319 for the Twins in 1916 in the midst of a professional football career.

Coming to Winston-Salem in 1916, after playing the 1915 season with the Greensboro Patriots, outfielder Frank Nesser batted .319 for the Twins in 1916, playing in 115 games at age 27. Nesser did not play again in the minor leagues until the 1920 season and he left baseball after batting .385 in 113 games for the Class B level Saginaw Aces in 1921. Nesser had previously been the player-manager of the Lima Cigarmakers. Nesser was a professional football player and he played six seasons in the early National Football League. Along with six of his brothers, the Nesser brothers all played professional football and were teammates for a duration. A halfback, lineman, punter and punter, Nesser frequently engaged in kicking contests with the legendary Jim Thorpe and once was credited with a 63-yard field goal. His punts were cited at frequently traveling 70 yards in the air. Nesser played professional football for the Columbus Panhandles (1907–1924), Akron Indians (1912, 1914) and Columbus Tigers (1925–1926). In his minor league baseball career, Frank Nesser had a career batting average of .328 in 4,032 at bats.

At age 31, infielder Charles Doak played for the Twins in 1916, his final professional season. While playing the 1916 baseball season, Doak was simultaneously a collegiate coach at the University of North Carolina at Chapel Hill. From 1914 to 1916, Doak was the coach of both the North Carolina Tar Heels men's basketball and North Carolina Tar Heels baseball teams. Doak later served as the NC State Wolfpack baseball coach at North Carolina State University.

After beginning play in the 1917 season, the six-team Class D level North Carolina State League folded during the season. The league folded after first losing two teams and attempting to continue play. The North Carolina State League folded, along with many other minor league, with the United States in the midst of World War I. During the season, both the Asheville Tourists and Raleigh Capitals teams folded on May 18, 1917, leaving the North Carolina State League with four remaining teams. The league attempted to continue play with four-teams, but the venture was unsuccessful. On May 30, 1917, the North Carolina State League folded. The Winston-Salem Twins had compiled a record of 17–20 and were in fourth place under long-time manager Charles Clancy when the league folded. The Durham Bulls won the league title with a 24–12 record, finishing 7.5 games ahead ot Winston-Salem. In the shortened North Carolina State League season Winston-Salem Twin outfielder Harry Chancey won the league batting title, hitting .366 with 48 total hits, most in the league.

Bud Davis played in the outfield for the1917 Winston-Salem Twin, hitting. 323 with 5 home runs in 25 games in the brief North Carolina State League season. Davis was first a pitcher in his professional baseball career, appearing in 17 games the major leagues with the 1915 Philadelphia Athletics at age 19, compiling a 3.38 ERA despite walking 52 and hitting 6 batters in 58 innings pitched against 12 strikeouts. He batted .348 in 23 at bats for Philadelphia. Davis eventually gave up pitching and became strictly a position player. Davis had a lengthy minor league playing career as he played in the minor leagues from 1915 to 1937. In his minor league career, he batted .331 with 253 home runs, 2,720 hits, 477 doubles and 131 triples, while playing in 2,244 minor league games.

The North Carolina State League did not return to play in 1918, and Winston-Salem was without a minor league team for the next two seasons.

=== 1920 to 1927: Piedmont League ===
After two seasons without a team, minor league play resumed in Winston-Salem in 1920 when a new league was formed. The Winston-Salem Twins became charter members of the six–team Class D level Piedmont League. The Danville Tobacconists, Durham Bulls, Greensboro Patriots, High Point Furniture Makers and Raleigh Nats teams joined with Winston-Salem in forming the new league. The first Piedmont League schedule began with opening games on April 21, 1920.

The Piedmont League was named for the region, as the six charter league member teams were located in the Piedmont plateau and Piedmont Triad regions within the Eastern United States.

In their first season of Piedmont League play, the 1920 Winston-Salem Twins ended the season in fourth place with a record of 56–65. Playing the season under managers Bill Shumaker, Eddie Brennan and Jim Kelly, the Twins finished 13.5 games behind the first place Greensboro Patriots in the overall standings, as the league played a split-season schedule and the two pennant winners met in the final series. The Twins did not qualify for the playoffs won by Greensboro over Raleigh. Twins outfielder Hobart "Rabbit" Whitman won the first Piedmont League batting title, hitting .351 on the season in his first professional season at age 21. Winston-Salem shortstop John Koval scored 92 runs to lead the league. In 51 games, Twins player-manager Bill Shumaker batted .444 in 205 at bats, playing first base.

In his only season of professional baseball, Jack Fleischman pitched for the Twins in 1920. Pitching in 33 games, Fleischman compiled a 14–11 record with a 3.00 ERA for Winston-Salem. Fleischman became a football player after his one season in professional baseball. He played football at Purdue beginning in 1922, before joining the National Football League. A Guard, Fleischman played for the Detroit Panthers (1925–1926) and Providence Steam Rollers (1927–1929) and was a starter on the 1928 NFL champion Providence team.

The Winston-Salem Twins continued play in the 1921 Piedmont League, as the six-team league was elevated to the Class C level for the season. Charles Clancy returned to the franchise as manager. The Twins ended the season with a record of 62–58 to end the season fourth place overall, 6.0 games behind first place Raleigh Red Birds in the overall standings. The league played a split season schedule, and Winston-Salem did not win either pennant to qualify for the playoff. The Piedmont League playoff series was won by the Greensboro Patriots over the High Point Furniture Makers.

Shortstop Ernie Padgett batted .292 while playing in 122 games for Winston-Salem in 1921. Padgett played in the major leagues for the Boston Braves (1923–1925) and Cleveland Indians (1926–1927), batting .266 in 271 games. In his second game in the major leagues, and the final games of the Boston Braves1923 season), Padgett turned the fourth unassisted triple playin baseball history. The play occurred on October 6, 1923 in the Braves' game against the Philadelphia Phillies in Boston. In the fourth inning, Padgett, was playing shortstop for Boston when he caught a line drive hit by Philadelphia's Walter Holke for the first out. Padgett then stepped on second base to retire Cotton Tierney for the second out, and tagged out Cliff Lee before he was able to return to first base for the third out. The Braves won the game by the score of 4-1

At age 18, catcher Al Spohrer played for the Twins in 1921 in his first professional season, batting .200 in 50 at bats. After a number of years playing in the minor leagues, Spohrer played in the major leagues with the New York Giants (1928) and Boston Braves (1928–1935). In his eight-season major league career, Spohrer compiled a .259 career batting average with 6 home runs and 199 RBIs in 731 career games. In the winter of 1930, Spohrer fought in a professional boxing match. He lost four rounds by technical knockout to Chicago White Sox player Art Shires in an event held at the Boston Garden. Shires boxed professionally on multiple occasions and after his fight with Spohrer, Baseball Commissioner Kenesaw Mountain Landis ruled that active professional baseball players were banned from participating in boxing matches, saying that "the activities do not mix." Later, Sporer and Shires became roommates when Shires joined the Boston Braves in 1932.

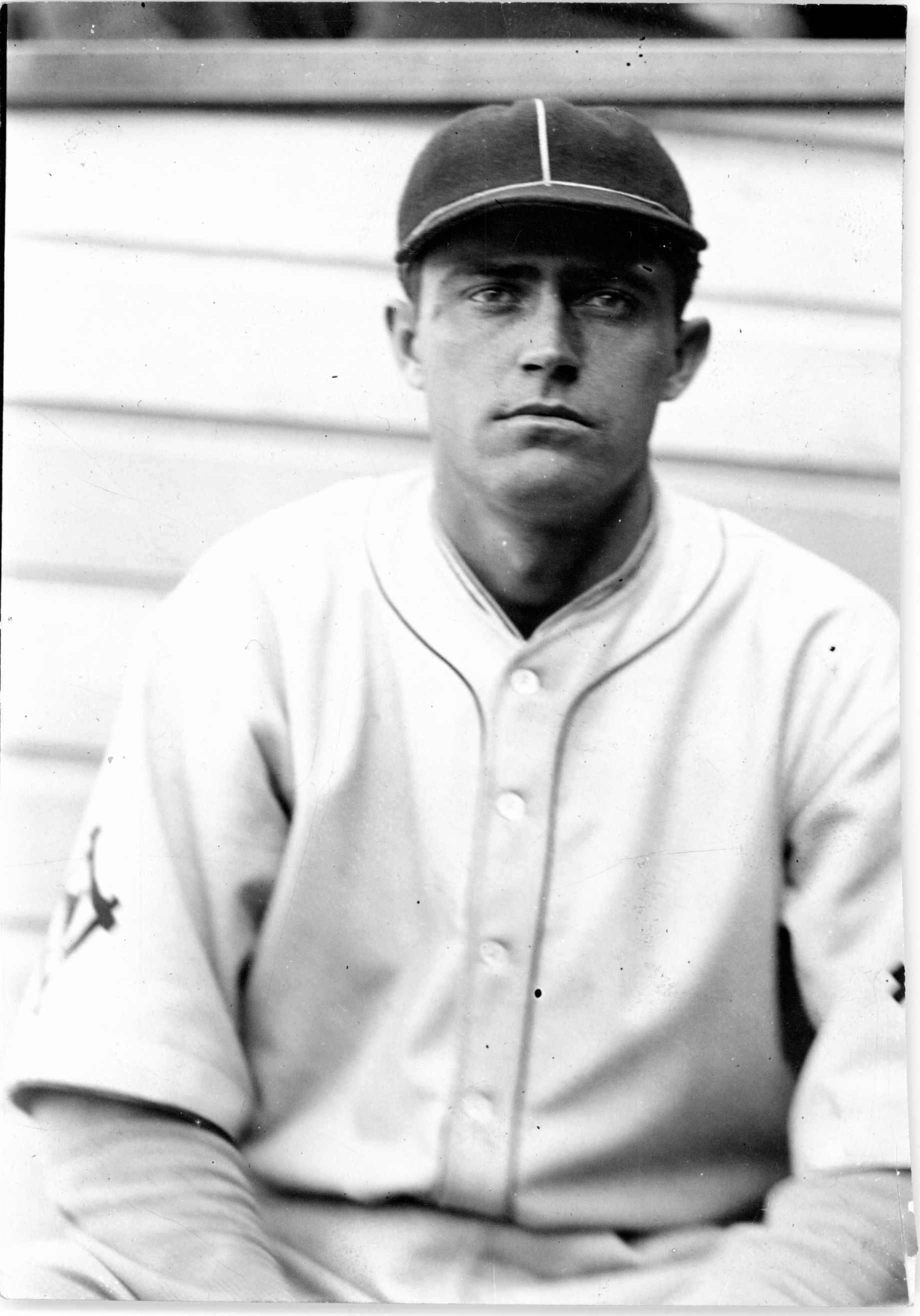
Bill Harris. Harris had a 24–15 record with a 2.69 ERA, pitching in 40 games and 321 innings for the 1922 Twins.

Winston-Salem continued membership in the Piedmont League for the 1922 season, as the six-team league continued as a Class C level league. The Winston-Salem Twins ended the season with an overall record of 66–59 and in third place. Manager Charles Clancy led the Twins as his tenure with the franchise continued. Winston-Salem finished 4.0 games behind the first place High Point Furniture Makers in the overall standings. In the split season schedule, the Twins did not qualify for the playoff, which was won by the Durham Bulls over High Point. Winston-Salem outfielder Rabbit Whiteman returned to the team and batted .327 playing in 129 games for the Twins at age 23. It was his third straight season with the Twins.

Twins' pitcher Bill Harris had a 24–15 record for the 1922 season, compiling a 2.69 ERA while pitching in 40 games and 321 innings. At age 22, Harris was in his second professional season in 1922. Harris made make his major league debut with the Cincinnati Reds in 1923 after his strong season with Winston-Salem. Harris pitched in the major leagues with the Cincinnati Reds (1923–1924), Pittsburgh Pirates (1931–1934) and Boston Red Sox (1938). In 121 major league games pitched, Harris had a 24–22 record, 8 saves with a 3.92 ERA. Harris pitched professionally for 24 seasons winning 262 total games and he ended his playing career in 1944 with an 8–4 season and a 2.73 ERA for the Erie Sailors at the age of 44.

Bill Leard was hired as the Twins' player-manager for the 1923 season at age 37, after spending the 1922 season as the second basemen with the Charleston Pals in the Class B level South Atlantic League. After leaving Winston-Salem, Leard ended the 1923 season as a player with the Danville Tobacconists. Leard had played briefly for the 1917 Brooklyn Robins (later the Dodgers). In 1927, Leard began a three-season tenure managing the Idaho Falls Spuds (1927) and Twin Falls Bruins (1928–1929) of the Utah-Idaho League in his final seasons in professional baseball.

On the opening day of the Piedmont League season, April 26, 1923, Winston-Salem Twins pitcher Thomas Gheen pitched a perfect game against the Greensboro Patriots. Gheen and the Twins won the game 5–0. After his perfect game performance, Gheen did not win another game for the Twins that season and was eventually suspended by the team for "insubordination" before being sold to the Houston Buffalos of the Texas League. Gheen was noted for his submarine style delivery as a pitcher.

The Twins placed fourth in the 1923 Piedmont League, as the league continued play as a Class C level league. The Winston-Salem Twins had an overall record of 59–63 in the six-team league, playing the season under managers Bill Leard and his replacement, Mike Fahey. The Twins finished 14.5 games behind the first place Danville Tobacconists in the final regular season standings. With the league adjusting from a split season schedule, Winston-Salem did not qualify for the playoffs won by Danville over second place Greensboro Patriots.

Replacing Mike Fahey, Bill Jackson joined the Twins as manager in 1924. Jackson came to Winston-Salem having managed the 1923 Bloomington Bloomers and the 1922 Peoria Tractors in the prior two seasons, both members of the Class B level Illinois-Indiana-Iowa League. Jackson had played in the major leagues in 1914 and 1915 with the Chicago Whales franchise of the Federal League, batting .138 in 143 games as a first baseman/outfielder.

With Jackson as manager, the Twins continued play in 1924 Piedmont League, again finishing in fourth place in the standings. The Piedmont League did not have a split season schedule and also discontinued the postseason playoff between the first place and second place teams in 1924. The Winston-Salem Twins ended the 1924 season with a record of 59–62 for their fourth-place finish in the six-team league. Playing the season under manager Bill Jackson, Winston-Salem finished 15.5 games behind the first place Durham Bulls in the final season standings. No playoff was held. Winston-Salem pitcher Johnny Wertz led the Piedmont League with 129 strikeouts. At age 26, in his first professional season, Wertz compiled a 15–15 record with a 2.58 ERA for the Twins. Following his season with Winston-Salem, Wertz made his major league debut in 1926. Wertz pitched for the Boston Braves from 1926 to 1929, compiling a 15-21 record and a 4.28 ERA in 88 career games.

Homer Peel played the outfield for the Winston-Salem in 1924 at age 21, batting .239 in 12 games for the Twins. Peel joined Winston-Salem after beginning the 1924 season with the Class D level Texarkana Twins of the East Texas League. Peel played in the major leagues with the St. Louis Cardinals (1927), Philadelphia Phillies (1929), St. Louis Cardinals (1930) and New York Giants (1933–1934), playing on the 1933 World Series champion New York Giants team. Peel batted .238 with two home runs and 44 RBI in 184 games during his Major League career. Peel played in two games of the 1933 World Series for the Giants. In Game 2, he was a defensive replacement in center field and batted 0-1 in the game. In Game 3, he singled as a pinch hitter against pitcher Earl Whitehill of the Washington Senators.

The Winston-Salem Twins won the Piedmont League pennant in the 1925 season, having the best overall record league and the Twins also won a split-season schedule title. Winston-Salem ended the season with an overall record of 77–49, finishing first place in the overall standings, playing manager Charlie Carroll. The Twins captured the league pennant finishing 9.0 games ahead of the second place Durham Bulls in the overall standings. With the split season schedule adopted, the Durham Bulls won the first half of the split season schedule, and the Twins won the second half of the split season schedule, setting up the two teams to meet in the playoff series. Winston-Salem lost in the final playoff to Durham 4 games to 3. Twins pitcher Roy Sullivan led the league with both 21 wins and 127 strikeouts while teammate Tommie Thompson had a 2.39 ERA to lead the league. The pennant winning team's lineup also featured first baseman Bud Ammons, who batted 334 with 17 home runs for the Twins, outfielder Rip Harris, who batted .327 and fellow outfielder Carr Smith hit .323 with 11 home runs. Carr Smith had previously played 10 total games for the Washington Senators in 1923 and 1925, before joining the Twins in 1925 at age 24.

After finishing with the best record in the league the season prior, the Winston-Salem Twins continued play as members of the six-team Class C level Piedmont League in the 1926 season. The Winston-Salem Twins ended the season in fifth place in the overall league standings, as the league continued with a split season schedule. The Twins finished the season with a record of 64–81, playing the season under four different managers: Cy Chisolm, Red Irby, Walt Christensen and Art Bourg. Winston-Salem was 21.5 games behind the first place Greensboro Patriots in the overall standings. The Twins did not qualify for the playoffs won by Greensboro over the third place Durham Bulls after Durham won the second half pennant to qualify for the playoff series. Winston-Salem pitcher Buck Taylor led the league with a 2.21 ERA. Outfielder Carr Smith returned to the Twins in 1926 at batted .300 in 40 games before moving to the Class B level Wilson Bugs of the Virginia League during the season.

The Twins improved their won-loss record by 15 games in the 1927 Class C level Piedmont League season. Winston-Salem ended the season with a record of 79–64 and in third place in the overall standings. Playing the entire season under manager Charles McMillan, the Twins finished 4.5 games behind the first place Rocky Mount Buccaneers in the overall standings. Winston-Salem did not qualify for the playoff won by the Salisbury-Spencer Colonials over the Raleigh Capitals. The Piedmont League continued their split season schedule format that saw Raleigh win the first half pennant and Salisbury-Spencer win the second half title. Twins player Charles Wade hit 24 home runs with 111 RBI to lead the league in both categories. Winston-Salem pitcher Roy Sullivan returned to the team led the Piedmont League with his 2.04 ERAon the season.

=== 1928: Piedmont League championship ===
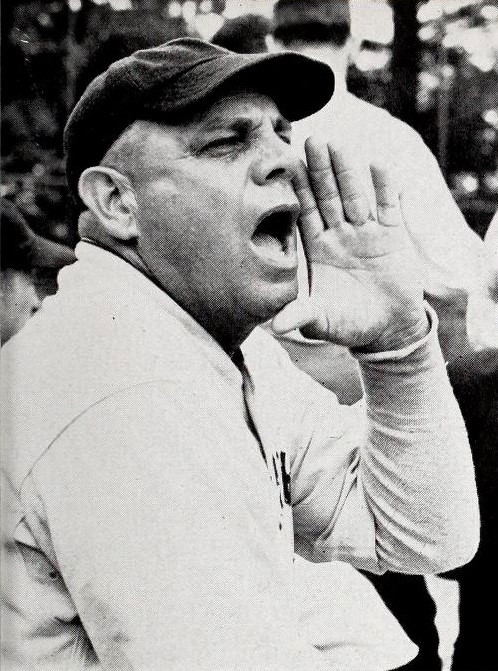
(1943) Bunny Hearn, head coach North Carolina Tar Heels baseball team. Hearn managed the Winston-Salem Twins to the 1928 Piedmont League championship. Hearn was a part-owner and also pitched for the Twins.

For the 1928 season, former major league pitcher, Bunny Hearn became the Winston-Salem Twins' part owner, manager and a pitcher on the team. As a player, Hearn had spent the previous seven seasons pitching for the Wilson Bugs of the Class B level Virginia League before moving to Winston-Salem at age 37. Hearn later became a collegiate baseball coach. After managing the Twins for a second time in the 1931 season, Hearn became the head coach of the North Carolina Tar Heels baseball team at the University of North Carolina in 1932. The Tar Heels captured six Southern Conference baseball championships during the Hearn era, as well as two wartime Ration League titles in 1943 and 1945. In 1947, Hearn suffered a stroke did not return to his head coaching duties at North Carolina. A left-handed pitcher Hearn had pitched in the major leagues for the St. Louis Cardinals (1910–1911), New York Giants (1913), Pittsburgh Rebels (1915) and Boston Braves (1918, 1920), compiling a 13–24 record and 3.56 ERA appearing in 66 career games. Beginning his professional career in 1910 at age 19, Hearn pitched in the minor leagues until 1931 at age 40, compiling 239 total wins in the minor leagues.

With Hearn as manager, the Winston-Salem Twins won the 1928 Piedmont League championship as the league remained a six-team Class C level league. The Twins ended the regular season with record of 82–51, finishing in first place by .002 percentage points over second place High Point Pointers (83–52), .617 to .615. They were followed by the third place Greensboro Patriots (76–56), Salisbury-Spencer Colonials (61–74), Raleigh Capitals (56–74) and Durhan Bulls (40–91) teams in the overall regular season standings. Winston-Salem won the league championship in defeating High Point 4 games, to 3 in the playoff final. Winston-Salem Twins pitcher Cyrus Smith led the Piedmont League with 20 wins and his Winston-Salem teammate Jack Fogelman led the league with a 2.68 ERA and had 16 wins on the season. At age 37, the Twins' player-manager Bunny Hearn had a 13–9 record with a 3.29 ERA. Other players contributing strong seasons for the championship Twins Were: first baseman Ben Anderson, who batted .352 with 40 doubles on the season, Outfielder Chick Evans who batted .317 with 28 doubles, 12 triples and 5 home runs and Art Reinholz, who hit .342 with 27 doubles, 11 triples and 8 home runs in 131 games.

Playing third base for the Twins, Reinholtz' strong showing for Winston-Salem led to his contract being purchased by the Cleveland Indians in late July 1928 and he remained with the Twins. On August 5, 1928, the Winston-Salem Journal headline stated "Reinholz Is One of Best Prospects Ever Developed in Piedmont Loop." Baseball reporter Frank Spencer stated that he was "one of the best physically built men ever to perform in the Piedmont League" and other baseball critics had "listed him as the best third baseman ever seen in" the league. After the Piedmont League season ended, Reinholtz reported to the Cleveland Indians and made his Major League debut on September 27, 1928. Reinholtz suffered an arm injury and eventually returned to the Winston-Salem Twins in 1931 season where his injury limited his effectiveness and led to his release by the team due to the injury June, 1931 after batting .228 in 28 games. After his release from the Twins, he never played another professional game.

=== 1929 to 1933: Piedmont League ===
After leading the Twins to the 1928 Piedmont League championship as an owner-player-manager, Bunny Hearn managed again in the Piedmont League in 1929. However, Hearn left the Twins after winning the championship and became the manager of the Henderson Bunnies, a team nicknamed after Hearn. With Hearn's departure, Winston-Salem named a new manager in 1929 to replace Hearn. Having been a player with the Salisbury-Spencer Colonials the previous two seasons, George Whiteman remained in the Piedmont League and became the Twins' player-manager in 1929. Whiteman was 46 years of age in 1929, in what became his final season as a player. Prior to his tenure with Winston-Salem, Whiteman played in the major leagues with the Boston Americans (1907), New York Yankees (1913) and Boston Red Sox (1918), playing a key role on the 1918 World Series champion Red Sox. With Boston at age 35, Whiteman played left field for the Boston Red Sox on the occasions when pitcher-outfielder Babe Ruth was pitching. In his platoon role, Whiteman batting .266 in 71 games for the Red Sox. In the 8th inning of the final game of the 1918 World Series, Whiteman make a somersault catch that helped preserve Boston's 2-1 victory that clinched the title. Whiteman batted 5-20 (.250) in the World Series.

With Whiteman appointed as their new manager, the 1929 Winston-Salem Twins continued Piedmont league as the defending league champions. In defending their title, the Winston-Salem Twins placed third in the 1929 Piedmont League regular season standings. Winston-Salem ended the regular season with a final record of 77–63 led by George Whiteman and finished 10.0 games behind the first place Durham Bulls in the final regular season standings. Winston-Salem did not qualify for the playoff final won by the second place Greensboro Patriots over the regular season first place Durham team, capturing the title with a 4 games to 1 series win.

At the age of 46, player-manager George Whiteman batted .267 for the Twins with 10 home runs and 84 RBIs, playing the outfield in 136 games. After the 1929 season Whitman concluded his playing career having played in a record 3,282 total minor league games, compiling 3,388 total minor league hits, along with 671 doubles and 196 triples.

The 1930 Winston-Salem Twins placed fourth in the Piedmont League season standings, continuing play in the six-team Class B level league, Winston-Salem ended the season with a record of 70–71, playing the season under managers Hal Weafer, Claude Joyner, Charlie Carroll and John Brock. The Twins finished 8.0 games behind the first place Henderson Gamecocks in the final standings. The Henderson franchise had replaced the Raleigh Capitals in the league two years earlier before Raleigh replaced the Salisbury Colonials in 1930. Winston-Salem did not qualify for the playoff won by second place Durham over Henderson. Twins pitcher Elmer Bray was the co-Piedmont League leader with 22 wins and his teammate Arthur Yeager led the league with a 2.47 ERA.

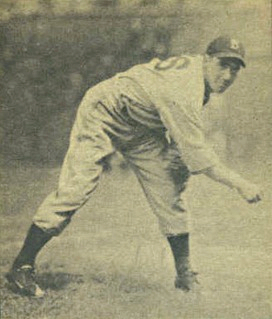
(1940) Van Lingle Mungo,Brooklyn Dodgers, Bowman baseball card. Mungro pitched for the 1930 Twins and became a four-time major league All-Star. Mungro was the namesake of the Van Lingle Mungo song, written in 1969.

Van Lingle Mungo pitched for the Winston-Salem Twins in 1930, compiling a record of 11-11 before finishing the season with the Charlotte Hornets. In 1931, after his season with Winston-Salem, Mungro made his major league debut with the Brooklyn Dodgers. In his major league career, Mungo pitched for the Brooklyn Robins / Dodgers (1931–1941) and New York Giants (1942–1943, 1945). The NL strikeout leader in 1936, Mungro was a five-time All-star and won 120 total games against 115 losses with 16 saves and a 3.47 ERA in his 14 major league seasons. Mungo was the losing pitcher for the National League in the 1934 All-Star Game. In 1969, Mungo was the namesake of the Van Lingle Mungo song, which was written and performed by musician Dave Frishberg, whose lyrics consist entirely of the names of baseball players of the 1940s. Mungo and Frishberg, appeared together on The Dick Cavett Show, where Frishberg sang the song in Mungo's presence.

The Piedmont League expanded from six teams to eight teams in the 1931 season, as the Asheville Tourists and Charlotte Hornets teams rejoined the league after the South Atlantic League folded after the 1930 season concluded. The Piedmont League remained classified as a Class C level league. Bunny Hearn returned as the Twins player-manager in 1931. The 1931 season was Hearn's final season as a player in professional baseball. The Winston-Salem Twins ended the season below .500, finishing the season with a record of 55–79. In the eight-team league, the Twins ended the season in sixth place in the regular season standings, playing the season under managers Bunny Hearn and his replacement, Stuffy McCrone. The Twins ended the season 43.5 games behind first place Charlotte (100–37) in the final standings. With their sixth place finish, the Twins did not qualify for the playoffs, which were won by Charlotte 4 games to 2 over the second place Raleigh Capitals. At age 40, Bunny Hearn had a 1–5 record pitching in 8 games for the Twins. His replacement as player-manager, Stuffy McCrone played first base in 131 games for Winston-Salem, hitting .286 with 10 home runs. The 1931 season was McCrone's first managerial experience, and he later served as a player-manager in the minor leagues from 1936 to 1941.

At age 40, Dixie Davis pitched for the Twins in 1931 in his final professional season, compiling a 3-2 record in 8 games. In his major league career with the Cincinnati Reds (1912), Chicago White Sox (1915), Philadelphia Phillies (1918) and St. Louis Browns (1920–1926), Davis compiled a 75–71 record with a 3.97 ERA.

Playing third base for Winston-Salem, Peahead Walker played for the Twins in 1931 at age 32, batting .296 in 80 games. Walker later served as a minor league manager for the Class D level Snow Hill Billies from 1937 to 1939 following his playing career. Walker served as a longtime collegiate coach in football, basketball and baseball, coaching at Howard, Birmingham Southern, Atlantic Christian, Yale and Wake Forest. Walker was the head coach of the Montreal Alouettes of the Canadian Football League from 1954 to 1959 and later was a scout for the football New York Giants from 1960 to 1970.

Winston-Salem had a new manager for the 1932 season while Stuffy McCrone returned to the Twins as a player. In what became his final professional baseball season at age 31, infielder Harry Wilke became the Winston-Salem Twins' player/manager for the 1932 season. Wilke had played the previous two seasons with the Bridgeport Bears of the Class A level Eastern League. Wilke played three games for the Chicago Cubs in 1927 in his lone major league appearances.

With Wilke as manager, the Winston-Salem Twins continued play in the eight-team Piedmont League as a minor league affiliate of New York Giants in the 1932 season. The Piedmont League itself was elevated from Class C and became a became a Class B level league. The Twins relocated during the 1932 season, as two league teams folded.

On August 20, 1932, the Winston-Salem Twins franchise moved to High Point, North Carolina, which had previously folded their High Point Pointers team from the league weeks earlier. On July 7, 1932, the first High Point Pointers team disbanded, along with the Asheville Tourists franchise, leaving the Piedmont League with six remaining teams. The Twins were a minor league affiliate of the New York Giants and had a record of 18–28 at the time of their relocation to High Point. After compiling a record of 50–38 while based in High Point, the Winston-Salem/High Point team ended the season with a final record of 58–66, playing the season under Harry Wilke, who managed the team in both locations. Their final record left the Twins/Pointers team in third place, finishing 12.0 games behind the Charlotte Hornets. The second place Greensboro Patriots defeated Charlotte in seven games in the playoff final. Parker Perry played for the team in both the Winston-Salem and High Point locations, hitting 19 home runs to lead the Piedmont League. Team player/manager Harry Wilke batted .270 in 63 games, while playing second base for Winston-Salem/High Point.

At age 21, playing in his first professional season, centerfielder Hank Leiber batted .362 for the Winston-Salem/High Point team in 1932, adding 14 home runs and 46 doubles and 193 total hits while playing in 134 games. A native of Phoenix, Arizona Leiber had attended Phoenix Union High School and the University of Arizona where was also a pitcher for the Arizona Wildcats baseball team prior to joining the Twins in 1932. The next season, following his strong season with Winston-Salem, Leiber made his major league with the New York Giants in April of 1933. On July 4, 1939, Leiber hit 3 home runs in a game for the Chicago Cubs against the St. Louis Cardinals at Wrigley Field. Playing in the major leagues with the New York Giants (1933–1938), Chicago Cubs (1939–1941) and New York Giants (1942), Leiber was named to three All-Star teams in his major league career. He compiled a .288 career batting average with 101 home runs, 518 RBIs and an OBP of .356 in 813 major league games.

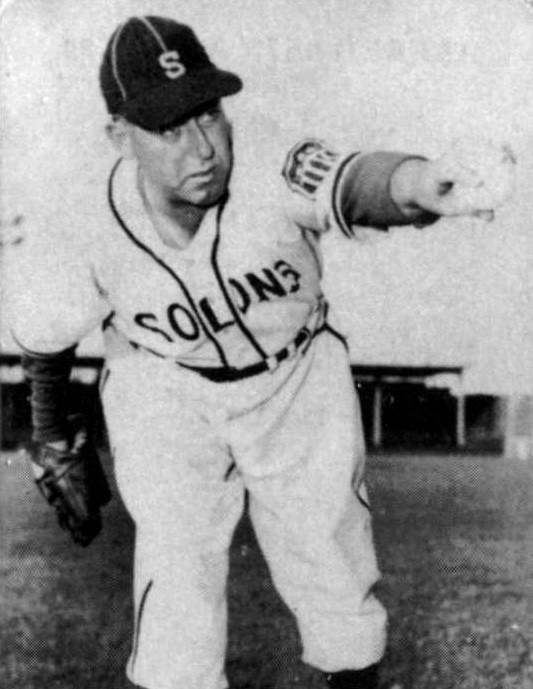
(1946) Al Smith, Sacramento Solons. Smith had a 17-8 record for the 1932 Winston-Salem Twins before becoming an All-Star major league pitcher.

Left-handed pitcher Al Smith pitched for the Twins in 1932 with a record of 17–8 and a league leading 2.21 ERA at age 24. Smith then found himself placed in a unique situation. Following his strong season with the Winston-Salem, Smith served as a nominal coach at age 25 on manager Bill Terry's New York Giants staff in 1933. Terry, realizing he had no room on his 1933 pitching staff, decided to keep Smith as a coach and batting practice pitcher, rather than risk losing him in the minor league draft. The Associated Press reported in a 1934 story, "Smith was tabbed as great prospect last spring, but Terry had so many experienced moundsmen to bank upon that there was no place for the young portsider. Rather than farm him out where he might have been grabbed by some rival club, the Giants elected to carry him as a coach." The reports were that the 1933 World Champion Giant hitters struggled against Smith's "wide breaking curves" when he pitched batting practice.

In his playing career, Smith was noted historically as the starting pitcher of the game on July 17, 1941 that ended Joe DiMaggio's legendary 56-consecutive-game hitting streak. Smith was on the 1936 and 1937 National League pennants winning Giants teams and pitched in the 1936 and 1937 World Series. In 1943, Smith was named to the American League All-Star team while pitching for the Cleveland Indians. In his major league career, Smith pitched for with the New York Giants (1934–1937), Philadelphia Phillies (1938–1939) and Cleveland Indians (1940–1945), compiling a career record of 99–101 with a 3.72 ERA and a 1.380 WHIP, In 356 games (202 started), Smith had 75 complete games, 16 shutouts and 17 saves.

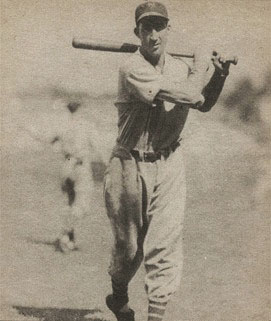
(1940) Catcher Harry Danning, New York Giants, baseball card. Danning played for High Point/Winston-Salem in 1932, batting .313 for the team, before beginning his major league career in 1933. Danning was a four-time major league All-star.

At age 20, in his second professional season, catcher Harry Danning played for the Winston-Salem/High Point team in 1932. Danning batted .313 with 4 home runs in 50 games. Danning had signed a $150-a-month contract to begin his professional career the previous season. In 1933, Danning made his major league debut with the New York Giants. From 1938 to 1941, Danning was selected for the National League team for the All-Star team in four consecutive years. In his rookie season, Danning played on the 1933 World Series champion New York Giants team that defeated the Washington Senators in the 1933 World Series, and appeared in the pennant-winning Ginats' teams that were defeated by the New York Yankees in losing both the 1936 World Series and 1937 World Series. Following the 1942 season, Danning entered military service during World War II. Danning served at the Long Beach Army Air Field, until he received a medical discharge in June 1945 due to arthritis in both of his knees. Following the completion of his military service, Danning never resumed his playing career.

Despite the franchise relocating to High Point during the previous season, the Winston-Salem Twins resumed play as members of the Piedmont League play in 1933. The league continued play as a six-team Class B level league. A High Point franchise did not rejoin the league in 1933, and the Raleigh Capitals and Asheville Tourists also did not return. The Twins finished in last place in the Six-team league. Compiling a final record of 42–99, Winston-Salem ended the season in sixth place. Manager Jim Poole led the team to a 25–36 record in his tenure during the season. Poole's replacement as manager, Art Bourg led the team to a 17–63 record as the Twins finished a distant 49.5 games behind the first place Greensboro Patriots in the final standings. No playoff was held as Greensboro won both halves of the split season schedule. At age 36, First baseman Art Bourg batted .277 for the Twins in 62 games as the player-manager to end the season. The 1933 was Bourg's final season in professional baseball in a career that began in 1918.

Jim Poole was replaced as player-manager on June 22, 1933, after compiling a 25–36 record with the Twins. Poole batted .259 in 65 games playing first base for the Twins. His partial season managing the Twins was his first managerial position at age 38 and Poole would go on to manage in the minor leagues through the 1961 season. In his lengthy career as a player in the minor leagues, Poole retired with 3,150 hits with 311 HR and 240 stolen bases, playing in the minor leagues between 1914 and 1946. Poole played the 1925 to 1927 seasons with the Philadelphia A's compiling a .288 average in 283 career major league games, playing as a first baseman.

The Winston-Salem Twins franchise did not return to the 1934 Piedmont League. The Twins were replaced by the Norfolk Tars franchise as the league continued play as a six-team league. The Norfolk team won the league championship in 1934, playing as a minor league affiliate of the New York Yankees.

=== 1937–1942: Return to Piedmont League / six last place finishes ===
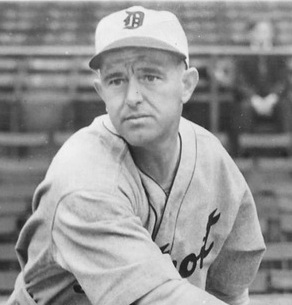
(1935) Alvin Crowder, 1935 World Series champion Detroit Tigers. A Winston-Salem native, Crowder pitched for Winston-Salem in 1924 and became the Twins' owner/manager/player in 1937 as he successfully led efforts to revive the franchise. The 1937 Twins began the season with a 0–28 record with Crowder as manager.

A former major league all-star, Alvin "General" Crowder was a native of Winston-Salem who became the owner of the Winston-Salem Twins franchise in 1937. At age 38, Crowder led the campaign to secure a minor league team in Winston-Salem for the 1937 Piedmont League season. Crowder managed the Twins to begin the season and also served as a broadcaster for the team during the season. Crowder had previously played for the 1924 Winston-Salem Twins at age 24. As a major league pitcher, Crowder had played his final major league season in 1936 with the Detroit Tigers. During his major league career with the Washington Senators (1926–1927), St. Louis Browns (1927–1930), Washington Senators (1930–1934) and Detroit Tigers (1934–1936) Crowder pitched in three World Series, playing on the 1935 World Series champion Tigers. Crowder compiled a 167–115 career record with 22 saves.

After a three-season absence, the Winston-Salem secured a team under Crowder's efforts and the Twins rejoined the Class B level Piedmont League in 1937 as the league expanded from six teams to eight teams. The Piedmont League added Winston-Salem and Charlotte Hornets as the two as expansion franchises. The Winston-Salem Twins finished in last place for the next six seasons of Piedmont League play.

The Twins returned to minor league play as a Detroit Tigers minor league affiliate and the entire league consisted of affiliated teams in 1937. In returning to the league, the Winston-Salem Twins joined the Asheville Tourists (St. Louis Cardinals), Charlotte Hornets (Washington Senators), Durham Bulls (Cincinnati Reds), Norfolk Tars (New York Yankees), Portsmouth Cubs (Chicago Cubs), Richmond Colts (New York Giants) and Rocky Mount Red Sox (Boston Red Sox) in the expanded league. The Piedmont League schedule began with the season openers on April 23, 1937.

With Twins player-owner General Crowder serving as manager to begin the season, the Twins lost their first 28 games of the 1937 season, beginning with an 0–28 record.

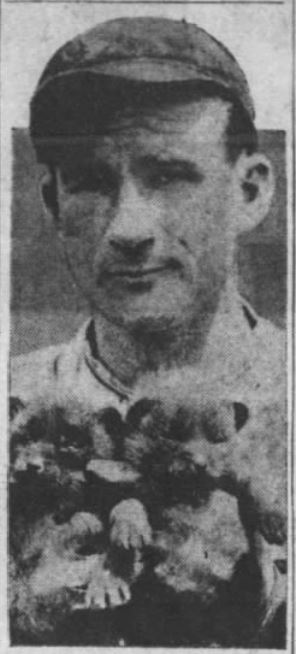
(1935) Alabama Pitts. Pitts played for the Twins in the 1937 after beginning a baseball career following his release from prison.

Outfielder Alabama Pitts began the 1937 season with the Twins, batting .278 with a .958 OPS in 23 games with Winston-Salem at age 29. At the age of 19, Pitts and an accomplice had robbed a New York City grocery store using a gun. Pitts was sentenced to serve eight to sixteen years in the Sing Sing prison for the crime. While in prison, Pitts became a member of the prison football and baseball teams and received notoriety for his play. On May 22, 1935, Pitts signed a contract with the Albany Senators of the International League for $200 per month. Pitts was allowed to sign with Albany after the warden of the prison ended Pitts' jail sentence three years early. He was released from prison in June 1935, having served over five years. On June 17, 1935, after some controversy due to his criminal background, Baseball Commissioner Kenesaw Mountain Landis ruled that Pitts could play professional baseball due to a "complete reformation in Pitts' character" after serving his time in prison. Pitts also played professional football in 1935 for the Philadelphia Eagles. After leaving the Twins in 1937, Pitts next played with the Gastonia Spinners of the independent Carolina League until he was released in June 1937 after a fight with the Gastonia manager. He finished the season with the Valdese Textiles in the Carolina League and had a total batting average of .333 for the 1937 season. After playing the 1938 season with both the Valders Textiles and Lenoir Finishers in the Carolina League, Pitts was hired as the baseball coach at Valdese High School. In 1940, he signed with the Hickory Rebels of the Tar Heel League and had a batting average of .303 in the season. On June 5, 1941, Pitts played a game for a House of David traveling baseball team. The next day he played for a Valdese semi-professional team on June 6, 1941. On June 7, 1941, Pitts was fatally stabbed in a tavern in Valdese, North Carolina. Pitts tried to cut in to dance with a woman with whom another man was dancing and was stabbed.

With their 0–28 start to begin the season, the Winston-Salem Twins struggled in their return to the Piedmont League in the 1937 season, finishing 70 games below .500. The Twins ended the season with a record of 35–105 and finished in a distant eighth place in the Class B level eight-team league. The 1937 Twins had four managers during the season: General Crowder, Pepper Rhea, Phil Lundeen and Walt VanGrofski. Winston Salem ended the regular season 54.5 games behind the first place Asheville Tourists and were also 30.5 games behind the seventh place team just ahead of them in the standings, the Charlotte Hornets. With their last place finish, the eighth place Twins did not qualify for the four-team Piedmont League playoffs, which were won by the Norfolk Tars.

A middle infielder, Bill Adair played for the Winston-Salem Twins in 1937, batting .293 in 80 games. He continued with the Twins in 1938, batting .298 with 6 home runs and 68 RBI in 111 games. Adair had a lengthy minor league playing career that spanned from 1935 to 1956, interrupted by his service in World War II. Adair was a long-time minor league manager, as he managed through 1973. Adair managed Baseball Hall of Fame member and home run champion Hank Aaron in his first season as a professional with the 1952 Eau Claire Braves. Also a major league coach for the Montreal Expos and Chicago White Sox, in 1970, Adair served as the manager of the Chicago White Sox until he was replaced in September 1973 by Chuck Tanner.

The Winston-Salem Twins continued play in the 1938 Piedmont League, becoming an affiliate of the Brooklyn Dodgers. The Twins again finished in last place, winning 11 games more than the previous season. With their 11 win improvement from the season before, Winston-Salem had a record of 46–92, finishing in eighth place, 39.0 games behind the first place Norfolk Tars and 17.0 games behind the seventh place Asheville Tourists in the final regular season standings. The Twins played under returning manager Walt VanGrofski who was replaced after the team began the season with a record of 7-15. On May 16, 1938, VanGrofski was replaced by Joe Prerost, who compiled a record of 39-77 in his tenure as manager. With their eighth-place finish, The Twins did not qualify for the four-team playoffs won by the Charolotte Hornets. Some sources indicate that Charles Clancy returned as the Winston-Salem manager in August of 1938. Twins pitcher Manuel Norris led the Piedmont League with 222 strikeouts.

At age 32, Twins' player/manager Joe Prerost began the 1937 season playing 14 games with the Elmira Pioneers of the Class A Level Eastern League before joining the Twins in his first and last managerial role. Playing as an outfielder, Prerost .278 with 2 home runs, 39 RBIs and 17 stolen bases in 66 games for the Twins, in what was his final season in professional baseball.

At age 28, Ace Adams pitched for the Twins in 1938, compiling a 16-10 record. Adams also appeared in 22 games in the outfield for Winston-Salem and posted a .233 batting average on the season. After making his major league debut at age 31, Adams pitched for the New York Giants from 1941 to 1946) and pitched in the 1943 Major League Baseball All-Star Game. In his major league career, Adams posted a 41–33 record with a 3.47 ERA and 49 saves in 302 games pitched.

The Winston-Salem Twins continued play in the Class B level Piedmont League in 1939 and had their third consecutive last place finish in the league standings. The Twins became a minor league affiliate of the Cleveland Indians and General Crowder returned as the Winston-Salem manager to begin the season. Crowder was succeeded as manager Charles Clancy, who rejoined the franchise continuing his lengthy association with Winston-Salem Twins that began in 1911. Clancy became the Twins' manager for the final time at age 60. The Winston-Salem Twins ended the season with a final record of 54–84, with twelve wins more than the prior season. The Twins finished in eighth place, ending the regular season 32.0 games behind the first place Asheville Tourists and 12.0 games behind the seventh place Charlotte Hornets in the final standings. The Piedmont League's four-team playoffs were won by the Asheville Tourists. General Crowder sold his majority shares of ownership of the Winston-Salem Twins in 1939.

Pitcher George Murray played for the 1939 Twins at age 40. In 17 games with Winston-Salem, Murray had a 7-8 record with 13 complete games in what was his final professional season as a player. A North Carolina Native, Murray was nicknamed "smiler" and had attended North Carolina State, where he played for the Wolfpack baseball team. In his major leaugue career with the New York Yankees (1922), Boston Red Sox (1923–1924), Washington Senators (1926–1927) and Chicago White Sox (1933), Murray had a 20–26 record with a 5.38 lifetime ERA.

In 1940, after General Crowder had sold his majority shares of the franchise, the Winston-Salem Twins became a Detroit Tigers minor league affiliate for the Piedmont League season. The Twins again finished in last place with a record of 45–85. With their eighth place finish, Winston-Salem ended the season 27.5 games behind the first place Richmond Colts in the regular season standings. In his second year with the team, player/manager Eddie Moore began the season as manager, compiling a record of 18–28, before being replaced by Ray Brubaker on June 10, 1940. The Twins compiled a 27–57 playing record under Brubaker after he replaced Moore as manager. The Piedmont League's four-team playoffs continued without the eighth place Twins and the regular season fourth-place Durham Bulls team captured the championship.

An infielder at age 41, The Twins player/manager Eddie Moore batted .250 in 23 games and 56 at-bats in his playing time for the Twins. Moore had played ten seasons in the major leagues for the Pittsburgh Pirates (1923–1926), Boston Braves (1926–1928), Brooklyn Robins (1929–1930), New York Giants (1932) and Cleveland Indians (1934), and played a starting role for the 1925 World Series champion Pittsburgh Pirates. Moore batted .289 with 6 home runs and 77 RBIS, while serving at Pittsburg's starting second baseman in 1925. Moore had 6 hits with a home run in the 1925 World Series for Pittsburgh. In 725 career major league games, Moore batted .285 with a .359 OBP and .725 OPS.

Moore's replacement as the Twins' manager, Ray Brubaker was a longtime minor league player and manager. Six years after his tenure with the Twins, Brubaker died during a game. Brubaker was managing the Terre Haute Phillies against the Waterloo Microbes in Waterloo, Iowa, when he died on May 1, 1947.

At age 61, Jake Atz became the Twins manager in 1941, replacing Ray Brubaker. It was the final managerial season for Atz, who served as a minor league manager for 27 seasons. Atz had served as manager of the Henderson Oilers in the Class C level East Texas League the prior two seasons, leading Henderson to one pennant and two playoff appearances. A former major league player, Atz played the middle infield for the Washington Senators (1902) and Chicago White Sox (1907–1909) in his four-season major league career. After his final season with the Twins, Atz had compiled a career record as a manager of 1,972 wins and 1,619 losses (.549) in 27 seasons of minor league baseball.

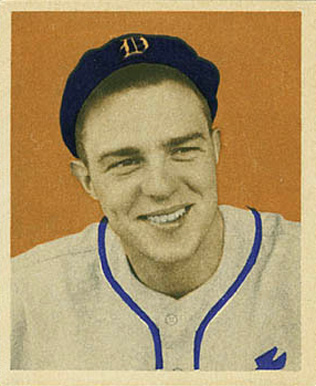
(1949) Outfielder Dick Wakefield, Detroit Tigers, Bowman baseball card. Wakefield batted .301 with Winston-Salem in 1941 also making his major league debut that season. Wakefield became a major league All-Star with Detroit.

Outfielder Dick Wakefield made his professional debut with the Twins in 1941. Wakefield had just completed the 1941 collegiate baseball season with the Michigan Wolverines baseball team. With the Wolverines Wakefield batted .372 with 9 home runs, as Michigan ended the season with a 24–8 record and the Big Ten Conference championship. Tigers scout, Wish Egan and Detroit Tigers owner, Walter O. Briggs, Sr. signed Wakefield a $52,000 signing ($1,138,235 today) bonus and he also received a new car. He received a new Lincoln Zephyr even though he did not know how to drive.The son of former major league catcher Howard Wakefield, Dick Wakefield batted .301 and slugged .507 in 55 games with Winston-Salem after joining the team following the collegiate season. He was called up by the Detroit Tigers during the 1941 season and made his major league debut while playing in seven games.

In 1943, at age 22, Wakefield was the starting left fielder for the American League in the All Star Game. He had 2 hits and drove in Ken Keltner for the game-winning run. Wakefield led the American League in 1943 with 200 hits and 38 doubles and finished second to Luke Appling with a .316 batting average. In 1944, Wakefield batted .355 in 78 games for Detroit. In his major league career, which was interrupted by service in 1944 and 1945 for the U.S. Navy during World War II, Wakefield played for the Detroit Tigers (1941, 1943–1944, 1946–1949) with very brief three game appearances for the New York Yankees (1950) and New York Giants (1952). For his major league career, Wakefield batted .293 with a .396 OBP and 56 home runs in 638 career games. Wakefield had a decline in his baseball career following his military service and he also held out from joining the New York Yankees in a salary dispute.

The 1941 Winston-Salem Twins continued play as a Detroit Tigers minor league affiliate for the Piedmont League season. The team finished in eighth place for the fifth consecutive season. The 1941 season saw the Twins compile a record of 54–82. With their last place in the eight-team league, Winston Salem ended the season 39.0 games behind the first place Durham Bulls, playing the entire season under manager Jake Atz. Winston-Salem did not qualify for the four-team playoffs, which were won by Durham in their sweep of both the Piedmont League regular season pennant and playoff championship.

Winston-Salem native Rufe Gentry returned to his hometown and pitched for the Twins in 1941. Gentry compiled a 14–18 record with a 2.96 ERA in the season. Gentry was born in the Daisy Station area, near Winston-Salem, North Carolina and the local baseball writers referred to Gentry as the "speedball king." Gentry had been working for Hanes Hosiery in Winston-Salem and played for the company baseball team when he was discovered and given a professional contract. Gentry began his professional career in 1939 with the Landis Senators of the North Carolina State League. In 1940, he pitched for the Fulton Tigers in the Kitty League before joining his hometown Twins in 1941. Following his season in his hometown, Gentry pitched in the major leagues for the Detroit Tigers in the 1943–1944, 1946–1948 seasons. Gentry did not play for the 1945 World Series champion Tigers team because he held out after asking for a $1,000 raise to his salary, a demand that was refused by Detroit. Genrty's pitching career was curtailed by a gun accident in 1946 in which Gentry's gun discharged while he was cleaning it. The accident left him with a noticeably crooked index finger on his pitching hand. In his major league career Gentry compiled a 13–17 record with a 4.37 ERA.

Catcher Hank Riebe played for Winston-Salem in 1941, batting .289 for the Twins. Following his season with Winston-Salem, Reibe made his major league debut with the Detroit Tigers in 1942, batting. 311 for Tigers, before his baseball career was interrupted by service in World War II combat. Riebe was drafted into the U.S. Army after the 1942 season ended. He served in the 66th Infantry Division in Europe. On December 24, 1944, Riebe was aboard the Léopoldville headed for Cherbourg, France, when the Léopoldville was struck by torpedoes from a German U-boat and sunk, killing 753 US Troops. In the attack, Riebe was wounded but survived after was rescued from the icy English Channel waters and recovered from his injuries. Riebe was awarded the Purple Heart medal. Returning to combat following his recovery in the spring of 1945, Riebe was injured in battle by fire from German artillery and again he survived, earning his second Purple Heart medal. Riebe recalled listening on the radio from a tent in France as his teammates on the Detroit Tigers won the 1945 World Series. "I heard my Tigers win that World Series. It was great!" he recalled. Reibe was discharged from the U.S. Army in 1946 and resumed playing professional baseball. He continued his career and played for the Detroit Tigers from 1947 to 1949, playing primarily as a back-up catcher. Reibe played his final baseball season in 1950for the Toledo Mud Hens before retiring as a player.

==== 1942: Final Piedmont League season ====
Jack Tighe was named as the Winston-Salem Twins' manager prior to the 1942 season. The previous two seasons Tighe had been the player-manager for the Muskegon Clippers, a Michigan State League, who were also a Detroit Tigers affiliate. After compiling a 6-18 with Winston-Salem t begin the season, Tighe was promoted to the major leagues and became a coach with the Detroit Tigers for the remainder of the 1942 American League season. After managing in the minor leagues beginning in 1943, Tighe was again on the coaching staff of the Detroit Tigers in 1955 and 1956. Tighe became the manager of the Tigers, replacing Bucky Harris and led the Tigers to a 78–76, fourth-place finish in 1957. After Detroit began the season with a 21–28 record in 1958 campaign, Tighe was fired and replaced by Bill Norman.

Pitcher Bobby Hogue played for the Twins in both the 1941 and 1942 season, compiling a 9-8 record with a 2.38 ERA in 29 games in 1941 and remaining with the team to compile a 17-13 with record a 2.21 ERA in 35 games and 253 innings for the Twins in 1942. After his two seasons with Winston-Salem, Hogue served three years in United States Navy during World War II. After his return from military service, Hogue pitched in the major leagues for the Boston Braves (1948–1951), St Louis Browns (1951), New York Yankees (1951–1952) and St. Louis Browns (1952) with an 18-16 career record in 172 career games. Hogue pitched for the 1951 World Series champion New York Yankees and appeared in two games in the World Series, throwing 2.2 scoreless innings. Hogue was called up to the major leagues from the Kansas City Blues on August 20, 1951, along with his 19-year-old Kansas City teammate named Mickey Mantle.

Catcher Al Unser replaced Jack Tighe as the Twins' manager, batting .234 with 2 home runs while playing in 107 games for Winston-Salem in his second season with the team. At the end of the Piedmont League season, Unser joined the Detroit Tigers. Unser made his major league debut at age 29 on September 14, 1942, in a home game against the Washington Senators at Briggs Stadium. In 120 games playing with Detroit and the Cincinnati Reds through 1945, Unser had a .251 batting average (85-for-338), with 4 home runs and 30 RBIs, scoring 41 runs, with a .322 on-base percentage, and a slugging percentage of .355. After his time in the major leagues, Unser continued to play catcher and manage in the minor leagues through 1962 at age 49.

Continuing as a Detroit Tigers, affiliate, the Winston-Salem Twins were again in the last place position for the 1942 Piedmont League season, their sixth consecutive eighth-place finish. In their final season in the Piedmont League, the Winston-Salem Twins ended the season with a record of 52–81. With their sixth consecutive eighth place finish, the Twins finished 27.0 games behind the first place Greensboro Red Sox, playing the season under managers Jack Tighe (6-18) and Al Unser (46-63). The Twins did not qualify for the four-team Piedmont League playoffs won by Greensboro, managed by Baseball Hall of Fame member Heinie Manush.

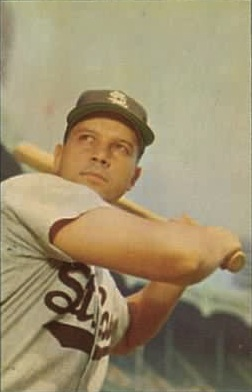
(1953) Vic Wertz, St. Louis Browns, Bowman baseball card. Wertz played for the Twins in 1942. Wertz became a 4-time major league All-Star. In the 1954 World Series, Wertz hit a ball caught by Giants outfielder Willie Mays, known as "The Catch.

Playing at age 20 after attending the University of Notre Dame, first baseman John McHale batted .216 in 92 games for the Twins in 1914. After batting .193 in five partial seasons with the Detroit Tigers, McHale became a baseball executive. McHale served as the general manager of the Detroit Tigers, Milwaukee / Atlanta Braves, and Montreal Expos in his executive career. He was the first president and executive director of the expansion Expos and owned ten percent of the team, serving in various roles with the Expos from 1969 through 1987.

In his first professional season at age 17, Vic Wertz played for the Twins in 1942. Wertz became a four-time major league all-star. Playing in the outfield, Wertz hit .229 in 222 at-bats while appearing in 63 games with the Twins. Wertz played with the Detroit Tigers (1947–1952), St. Louis Browns / Baltimore Orioles (1952–1954), Cleveland Indians (1954–1958), Boston Red Sox (1959–1961), Detroit Tigers (1961–1963) and Minnesota Twins (1963). During his later playing career, Wertz was stricken with a nonparalytic form of polio, but returned to play. In his major league career, Wertz hit 266 home runs with 1,178 RBIs, a .364 career on-base percentage and a .469 career slugging average.

During the first game 1954 World Series, Wertz was part of a historical moment while playing for the Cleveland Indians against the New York Giants in the series. After having hit a triple, a double and two singles earlier in the game, Wertz hit a long fly ball that Giants outfielder Willie Mays caught over his shoulder with his back to home plate, with the play known as "The Catch". Wertz' drive traveled over 450 feet (140 m) to right center in the Polo Grounds, which had a centerfield distance of 483 feet (147 m) feet. A newspaper sportswriter said, "It would have been a home run in any other park, including Yellowstone."

Following the 1942 season, in the midst of World War II, the Piedmont reduced to become a six-team league in 1943. The Winston-Salem Twins and Greensboro Red Sox teams were folded and did not return to the league in 1943. After a two season hiatus, Winston-Salem next hosted minor league baseball in 1945, with a new nickname while playing in a new league.

=== Post Winston-Salem Twins teams continue play ===
After a two-season hiatus during World War II, Winston-Salem resumed minor league play in 1945, when the Winston-Salem Cardinals began a long tenure as members of the Carolina League that lasted through 2020. The Carolina League team was again known as the "Twins" from 1954 to 1956, evolving into today's Winston-Salem Dash. Today, the Winston-Salem Dash continue minor league play, becoming members of the Class A level South Atlantic League in 2021.

== The ballpark ==
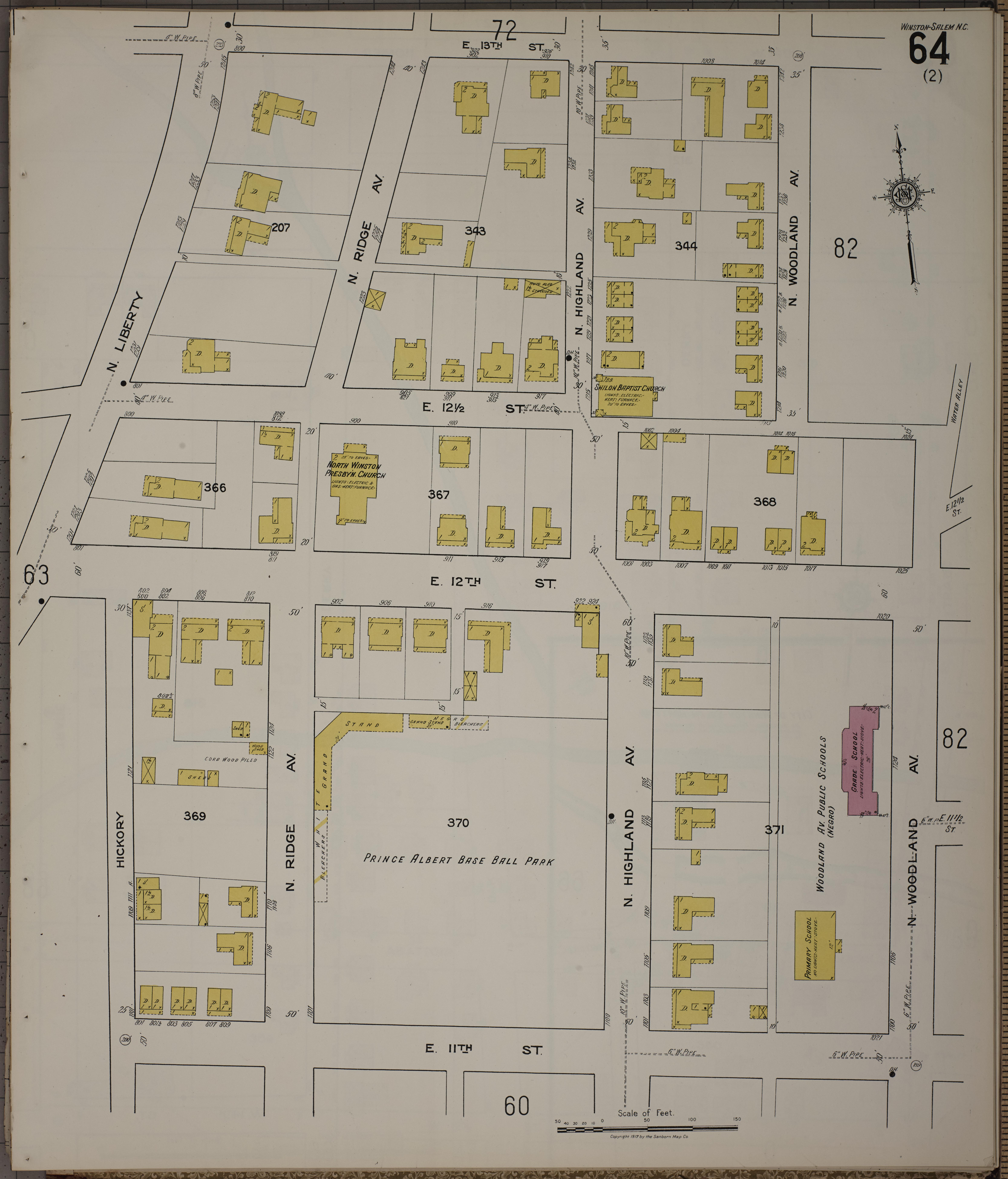
(1917) Sanborn Fire Insurance Map Plate 64. Prince Albert Park within (lower, center). The Bleacher sections are labeled "Negro" and "White."

For their duration thorough the 1942 season, the Twins hosted minor league games at South Side Park, which was called Prince Albert Park in the era. The ballpark hosted the Twins for 31 seasons beginning in 1905.

In 1905, the towns of Winston and Salem, hosted games as a new baseball park. The park was being built that season near the intersection of Twelfth Street and Highland Avenue. William Neal Reynolds, younger brother of R.J. Reynolds, owned the land, and partnered with Henry E. Fries, owner of Fries manufacturing and power companies. The ballpark became known as Prince Albert Park corresponding with the R.J. Reynolds Tobacco Company’s pipe tobacco brand.

Another tenant of the ballpark was the local Pond Giants team, who hosted games at Prince Albert Park playing against teams from the Negro Leagues.

In the era, the ballpark was located on a parcel between East 11th Street and East 12th Street, bordered by North Ridge Avenue and North Highland Avenue. Today, the parcel contains the Kennedy Campus North Parking Lot 1.

== Timeline ==
Year(s)	# Yrs.	Team	Level	League	Affiliate	Ballpark(s)
1905	1	Winston-Salem Twins	Class D	Virginia-North Carolina League	None	Prince Albert Park
1908–1912	5	Winston-Salem Twins	Class D	Carolina Association	None	Prince Albert Park
1913–1917	5	Winston-Salem Twins	Class D	North Carolina State League	None	Prince Albert Park
1920	1	Winston-Salem Twins	Class D	Piedmont League	None	Prince Albert Park
1921–1931	11	Winston-Salem Twins	Class C	Piedmont League	None	Prince Albert Park
1932	1	Winston-Salem Twins	Class B	Piedmont League	None	Prince Albert Park
1933	1	Winston-Salem Twins	Class B	Piedmont League	New York Giants	Prince Albert Park
1937	1	Winston-Salem Twins	Class B	Piedmont League	Detroit Tigers	Prince Albert Park
1938	1	Winston-Salem Twins	Class B	Piedmont League	Brooklyn Dodgers	Prince Albert Park
1939	1	Winston-Salem Twins	Class B	Piedmont League	Cleveland Indians	Prince Albert Park
1940	1	Winston-Salem Twins	Class B	Piedmont League	None	Prince Albert Park
1941–1942	2	Winston-Salem Twins	Class B	Piedmont League	Detroit Tigers	Prince Albert Park

== Year–by–year records ==
Year	Record	Finish	Manager	Playoffs/notes
1905	42–74	3rd	Con Strouthers / Earle Holt	Salisbury–Spencer (32–60) moved to Winston–Salem July 17; League folded August 19
1908	41–48	4th	Bobby Carter	No playoffs held
1909	54–52	4th	Bobby Carter	No playoffs held
1910	51–57	4th	James McKivett	No playoffs held
1911	72–37	1st	Charles Clancy	No playoffs held League champions
1912	63–47	2nd	Charles Clancy	No playoffs held
1913	66–49	1st	Charles Clancy	No playoffs held League champions
1914	70–47	1st	Charles Clancy	No playoffs held League champions
1915	53–69	5th	Charles Clancy	No playoffs held
1916	63–48	2nd	Charles Clancy	Did not qualify
1917	17–20	4th	Charles Clancy	League folded May 30
1920	56–65	4th	Bill Shumaker / Eddie Brennan; Jim Kelly	Did not qualify
1921	62–58	4th	Charles Clancy	Did not qualify
1922	66–59	3rd	Charles Clancy	Did not qualify
1923	59–63	4th	Bill Leard / Mike Fahey	Did not qualify
1924	59–62	4th	Bill Jackson	Did not qualify
1925	77–49	1st	Charlie Carroll	Won league pennant Lost in final
1926	64–81	5th	Cy Chisolm / Red Irby; Walt Christensen / Art Bourg	Did not qualify
1927	79–64	3rd	Charles McMillan	Did not qualify
1928	82–51	1st	Bunny Hearn	League champions
1929	77–63	3rd	George Whiteman	Did not qualify
1930	70–71	4th	Hal Weafer / Claude Joyner; Charlie Carroll / John Brock	Did not qualify
1931	55–79	6th	Bunny Hearn / Stuffy McCrone	Did not qualify
1932	69–62	3rd	Harry Wilke	Winston-Salem (18–28) moved to High Point August 20
1933	42–99	6th	Jim Poole (25–36) / Art Bourg (17–63)	Did not qualify
1937	35–105	8th	Alvin Crowder / Pepper Rhea / Phil Lundeen / Walt VanGrofski	Did not qualify
1938	46–92	8th	Walt VanGrofski (7-15) / Joe Prerost (39-77)	Did not qualify
1939	54–84	8th	Charles Clancy / Alvin Crowder	Did not qualify
1940	45–85	8th	Eddie Moore (18-28) / Ray Brubaker (27-57)	Did not qualify
1941	54–82	8th	Jake Atz	Did not qualify
1942	52–81	8th	Jack Tighe (6-18) / Al Unser (46-63)	Did not qualify

== Notable alumni ==
- Bill Adair (1937–1938)
- Ace Adams (1937), MLB All-Star
- Ángel Aragón (1926)
- Jack Aragón (1939)
- Fred Archer (1940)
- Jake Atz (1941, MGR)
- Turner Barber (1915)
- Harry Baumgartner (1910, 1915)
- Neil Berry (1942)
- Garland Braxton (1939–1940)
- John Brock (1930, MGR)
- Jim Brown (1911)
- Ray Brubaker (1940, MGR)
- Dan Carnevale (1940)
- Blackie Carter (1923)
- Henry Cote (1910)
- Alvin "General" Crowder (1923–1924; 1937, 1939, MGR)
- Jim Curry (1922)
- Harry Danning (1932), 4x MLB All-Star
- Bud Davis (1917)
- Dixie Davis (1931)
- Art Decatur (1915)
- Eddie Dent (1909)
- Charles Doak (1916)
- Joe Dolan (1909)
- Dutch Dorman (1922)
- Joe Erautt (1941)
- Hoot Evers (1941)
- John Farrell (1892)
- Bill Fetzer (1909)
- Jack Fleischman (1920)
- Rufe Gentry (1941)
- Thomas Andrew Gill (1915)
- Bob Gillespie (1941)
- Joe Gingras (1914–1915)
- Whitey Glazner (1915–1916)
- Ted Gray (1942), MLB All-Star
- Harvey Green (1937)
- Harvey Grubb (1910)
- Bob Hall (1942)
- Jim Hamby (1922–1924)
- Fred Hancock (1941)
- Charlie Harding (1913)
- Bill Harris (1922)
- Ray Hartranft (1911–1912)
- Arthur Hauger (1928)
- Red Hayworth (1940)
- Bunny Hearn (1928, 1931, MGR)
- Tom Hess (1908)
- Jim Hickman (1914)
- Hob Hiller (1916)
- Bill Jackson (1924, MGR)
- Art Jones (1929)
- Ted Jourdan (1915)
- George Kopshaw (1928)
- Tom Lanning (1932)
- Billy Laval (1909–1910)
- Bill Leard (1923, MGR)
- Hank Leiber (1932), 3x MLB All-Star
- Glenn Liebhardt (1939)
- Bill Lindsay (1908)
- Carlisle Littlejohn (1924)
- Wes Livengood (1932)
- Jerry Lynn (1937)
- John Lyston (1892)
- Joe Malay (1932)
- Gene Markland (1940)
- Wade Marlette (1923)
- Ambrose McGann (1892)
- Bill McGhee (1937–1939)
- John McHale (1942), Montreal Expos Hall of Fame
- Dizzy McLeod (1923)
- Charlie Mead (1942)
- Johnny Meador (1914–1915)
- Ezra Midkiff (1910)
- Eddie Moore (1939; 1940, MGR)
- Walter Moser (1905)
- Bill Mueller (1940)
- Moon Mullen (1941)
- Van Lingle Mungo (1930), 5x MLB All-Star
- Leo Murphy (1928)
- George Murray (1938–1939)
- Frank Nesser (1916)
- Dave Odom (1939)
- Jonh O'Neil (1940)
- Ernie Padgett (1921)
- Jay Partridge (1933)
- Homer Peel (1924)
- Clarence Pickrel (1940)
- Jess Pike (1940)
- Alabama Pitts (1937)
- Jim Poole (1933, MGR)
- Bill Quarles (1892)
- Roy Radebaugh (1912)
- Carl Ray (1912–1915)
- Harry Redmond (1909)
- Art Reinholz (1928, 1931)
- Jack Reis (1909–1910)
- Hank Riebe (1941)
- Ray Rolling (1914, 1916)
- Bama Rowell (1938)
- Mickey Rutner (1941)
- Gene Rye (1928)
- Jack Salveson (1932)
- Walter Schmidt (1909)
- Bill Shanner (1921)
- Scottie Slayback (1931)
- Al Smith (1932), MLB All-Star
- Carr Smith (1925–1926)
- Harry Smith (1913)
- Mike Smith (1932)
- Harry Smythe (1927)
- Al Spohrer (1921)
- Gale Staley (1924)
- Jerry Standaert (1924)
- Walter Stephenson (1932)
- Bill Strickland (1940)
- Con Strouthers (1905, MGR)
- Luke Stuart (1913–1915)
- Josh Swindell (1910-1911)
- Edward "Pop" Tate (1892, MGR)
- Jack Tighe (1942, MGR)
- Tip Tobin (1932)
- George Tomer (1928)
- Jim Turner (1925)
- Turkey Tyson (1940)
- Al Unser (1941; 1942, MGR)
- Joe Vance (1931)
- Pat Veltman (1932)
- George Vico (1942)
- Dick Wakefield (1941), MLB All-Star
- Peahead Walker (1931)
- Bob Way (1930)
- Hal Weafer (1930, MGR)
- Johnny Werts (1924)
- Vic Wertz (1942), 4x MLB All-Star
- Lefty West (1937–1938)
- Bill Whaley (1931)
- Woody Wheaton (1938)
- George Whiteman (1929, MGR)
- Rabbit Whitman (1920–1922, 1933)
- Harry Wilke (1932, MGR)
- Ducky Yount (1915)

== See also ==
- Winston-Salem Blue Sluggers players
- Winston-Salem Twins players
