= Wally Smith =

Wally Smith may refer to:

- Wally Smith (baseball) (1888–1930), MLB player
- Wally Smith (footballer, born 1874) (1874–1958), English footballer with Lincoln, Brighton, Norwich and Southend in the 1900s
- Wally Smith (footballer, born 1885) (1885–1917), English footballer with Bury and Birmingham in the 1910s
- Wally Fullerton Smith (born 1960), Australian rugby league player
- Wally Smith, La Choy Chinese food co-founder
- Wally Smith (mathematician) (1926–2023), British-American mathematician

== See also ==
- Walter Smith (disambiguation)
- Wallace Smith (disambiguation)
