= Walter Smith (disambiguation) =

Walter Smith (1948–2021) was a Scottish football player, manager and director.

Walter Smith may also refer to:

== Politicians ==
- Walter I. Smith (1862–1922), American politician, U.S. representative from Iowa and U.S. federal judge
- Walter Bedell Smith (1895–1961), American Army general, diplomat, and politician
- Walter Smith (British politician) (1872–1942), member of parliament for Wellingborough, 1918–1922, and Norwich, 1923–1924 and 1929–1931
- Walter Bernard Smith (1912–1987), Canadian politician, member of the House of Commons
- Walter L. Smith Jr. (1917–1994), American politician in New Jersey
- Walter J. Smith (1870–1950), American banker and politician in Minnesota

== Sports ==
- Walter Parry Haskett Smith (1859–1946), British rock climber
- Walter Smith (winger) (1869-1947), English football player
- Wally Smith (footballer, born 1874) (1874–1958), English footballer with Lincoln, Brighton, Norwich and Southend in the 1900s
- Walter Smith (American football) (1875–1955), American football player and military officer
- Walter Smith (footballer, born 1884) (1884–1972), English football player
- Wally Smith (footballer, born 1885) (1885–1917), English footballer
- Red Smith (sportswriter) (Walter Wellesley Smith, 1905–1982), American sportswriter
- Walter Smith (cricketer) (1913–2007), English cricketer
- Walter Smith (hurdler) (born 1920), winner of the 400 m hurdles at the 1942 USA Outdoor Track and Field Championships
- Wally Fullerton Smith (born 1960), Australian rugby league player

== Others ==
- Walter Smith (art educator) (1836–1886), British art educator and author of drawing books and books on industrial art education
- Walter Smith (land surveyor) (1920–2018), first civilian director of the Ordnance Survey
- Walter B. Smith (Medal of Honor) (1827–?), American sailor and Medal of Honor recipient
- Walter Campbell Smith (1887–1988), British mineralogist and petrologist
- Walter Chalmers Smith (1824–1908), British poet and minister of the Free Church of Scotland
- Wally Smith (mathematician) (1926–2023), American mathematician
- Walter Mackersie Smith (1842–1906), British engineer
- Walter Mickle Smith (1867–1953), American civil engineer
- Walter Scott Smith Jr. (born 1940), United States federal judge
- Walter Smith, pseudonym of spammer Davis Wolfgang Hawke (1978–2017)
- Walter Smith (bushman) (1898–1990), Australian bushman
- Walter Edmond Smith (1895–1976), Australian Army officer and industrialist
- Walter Smith III (born 1980), American jazz saxophonist and composer
- Walter Whately Smith (1892–1947), British parapsychologist
- Walter L. Smith (scholar) (1935–2021), president emeritus of Florida A&M University
- Walter H. F. Smith (21st century), geophysicist
- J. Walter Smith (1869–1931), editor of the American edition of The Strand Magazine

== See also ==
- Walter Smith, a non-playable character of Ninja Gaiden
- Wally Smith (disambiguation)
- John Walter Smith (1845–1925), politician in Maryland
- Walter E. Smithe (established 1945), Illinois-based furniture company
