= 1916 Los Angeles Angels season =

1916 Los Angeles Angels
- League: Pacific Coast League
- Ballpark: Washington Park
- City: Los Angeles
- Record: 119–79
- League place: 1st
- Managers: Frank Chance

The 1916 Los Angeles Angels season was the 14th season for the Los Angeles Angels playing in the Pacific Coast League (PCL). The Angels compiled a 119–79 record and won the PCL pennant. The team played its home games at Washington Park in Los Angeles.

Frank Chance, at age 38, was the team's manager and also appeared in 11 games as a player. Chance was the first baseman immortalized in Franklin Pierce Adams' famous poem about the Chicago Cubs' infield combination of Tinker to Evers to Chance.

== Position players ==
Catcher Johnny Bassler was 20 years old at the start of the season and led the team with a .304 batting average. Rated as one of the 50 best catchers in baseball history in The Bill James Historical Baseball Abstract, Bassler was later inducted into the Pacific Coast League Hall of Fame.

Right fielder Harry Wolter, a California native, began his career in the PCL in 1905 and 1906, played in the majors from 1907 to 1913, and returned west in 1914 to join the Angels. He appeared in 173 games for the 1916 Angels, tied for the PCL lead with 12 triples, and led the team with a .410 slugging percentage.

First baseman Phil Koerner led the team with 199 hits and tied for the PCL lead with 12 triples. Koerner played six seasons in the PCL from 1916 to 1920, including stints with the Oakland and San Francisco clubs.

Left fielder Rube Ellis appeared in 197 games and led the team with 755 at bats. Ellis began his career with the Angels from 1905 to 1908, played for the St. Louis Cardinals from 1909 to 1912, and then returned to the Angels for whom he played from 1913 to 1921. In all, he played 19 seasons of professional baseball.

== Pitchers ==
Pitcher Jack Ryan finished second in the PCL with 29 wins (29-10 record) and a 2.19 earned run average (ERA). He appeared in 48 games for the Angels in 1916. Ryan played for the Angels from 1913 to 1917, winning 108 games over those five seasons.

Pete Standridge, a native of Enumclaw, Washington, also had a strong season. He appeared in 44 games and compiled a 20–10 record with a 2.53 ERA.

== 1916 PCL standings ==
Team	W	L	Pct.	GB
Los Angeles Angels	119	79	.601	--
Vernon Tigers	115	91	.558	8.0
Salt Lake City Bees	99	96	.508	18.5
San Francisco Seals	104	102	.505	19.0
Portland Browns	93	98	.487	27.5
Oakland Oaks	72	136	.346	52.0

== Statistics ==
=== Batting ===
Note: Pos = Position; G = Games played; AB = At bats; H = Hits; Avg. = Batting average; HR = Home runs; SLG = Slugging percentage

Pos	Player	G	AB	H	Avg.	HR	SLG
C	Johnny Bassler	124	349	106	.304	0	.367
RF	Harry Wolter	173	615	182	.296	6	.410
2B	Polly McLarry	168	553	162	.293	5	.391
C	Walter Boles	101	307	88	.287	2	.358
3B	Joe Schultz	59	221	62	.281	0	.326
1B	Phil Koerner	197	720	199	.276	3	.371
CF	Harl Maggert	182	672	184	.274	6	.374
LF	Rube Ellis	197	755	192	.254	2	.326
3B	Jim Galloway	153	544	133	.244	9	.346

=== Pitching ===
Note: G = Games pitched; IP = Innings pitched; W = Wins; L = Losses; PCT = Win percentage; ERA = Earned run average

Player	G	IP	W	L	PCT	ERA
Jack Ryan	48	349.2	29	10	.744	2.19
Pete Standridge	44	267.0	20	10	.677	2.53
Zip Zabel	44	272.1	17	13	.567	2.38
Brad Hogg	41	231.2	16	9	.640	2.64
Oscar Horstmann	44	232.0	11	14	.440	2.56
Jim Scoggins	31	143.2	11	8	.579	3.70
Charley Hall	22	128.1	6	6	.500	3.37
