= Arnold Hauser =

Arnold Hauser may refer to:

- Arnold Hauser (art historian) (1892–1978), Hungarian writer
- Arnold Hauser (baseball) (1888–1966), American baseball player
