= Wallace Smith =

Wallace Smith may refer to:

- Wallace Smith (boxer) (1924–1973), American world lightweight boxing champion
- Wallace Smith (footballer) (1881–1917), English footballer
- W. Wallace Smith (1900–1989), Prophet-President of the Reorganized Church of Jesus Christ of Latter Day Saints
- Wallace B. Smith (born 1929), Prophet-President of the Reorganized Church of Jesus Christ of Latter Day Saints
- Wallace Smith (illustrator), American book illustrator and screenwriter
- Wally Smith (baseball) (1888–1930), American baseball player

== See also ==
- Wally Smith (disambiguation)
