= Gene Woodburn =

American baseball player (1886–1961)

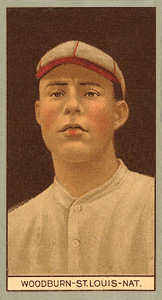
- Pitcher
- Born: August 20, 1886; Bellaire, Ohio, U.S.
- Died: January 18, 1961 (aged 74); Sandusky, Ohio, U.S.
- Batted: Right Threw: Right

MLB debut
- July 27, 1911, for the St. Louis Cardinals

Last MLB appearance
- September 27, 1912, for the St. Louis Cardinals

MLB statistics
- Win–loss record: 2-9
- Earned run average: 5.50
- Strikeouts: 23
- Stats at Baseball Reference

Teams
- St. Louis Cardinals (1911–12)

Eugene Stewart Woodburn (August 20, 1886 – January 18, 1961) was an American professional baseball pitcher. He played two seasons in Major League Baseball for the St. Louis Cardinals (1911–12).
