= Walter Smith (winger) =

English footballer

Personal information
- Place of birth: Grimsby, England
- Position: Winger

Senior career*
Years	Team	Apps	(Gls)
1891–1892	Grimsby All Saints		
1892–1893	Grimsby Town	2	(1)
1893–189?	Grimsby All Saints		
- * Club domestic league appearances and goals

Walter Smith was an English professional footballer who played as a winger.
