= Ed Conwell =

American baseball player (1890–1926)

- Third baseman
- Born: January 29, 1890; Chicago, Illinois, U.S.
- Died: May 1, 1926 (aged 36); Chicago, Illinois, U.S.
- Batted: Right Threw: Right

MLB debut
- September 22, 1911, for the St. Louis Cardinals

Last MLB appearance
- September 22, 1911, for the St. Louis Cardinals

MLB statistics
- Games played: 1
- At bats: 1
- Hits: 0
- Stats at Baseball Reference

Teams
- St. Louis Cardinals (1911)

Edward James "Irish" Conwell (January 29, 1890 – May 1, 1926) was an American professional baseball player from 1909 to 1919. Primarily a third baseman, he appeared in one Major League Baseball game for the St. Louis Cardinals in 1911. He was 5 feet, 11 inches tall and weighed 155 pounds.

== Career ==
Conwell was born in Chicago, Illinois, in 1890. He started his professional baseball career in 1909, playing for the Ohio State League's Portsmouth Cobblers. Conwell had a batting average of .161 in 34 games that season. In 1910, he became the team's regular third baseman and batted .208 in 131 games. He improved his average even more in 1911, batting .306 and leading the Cobblers with 160 hits. On September 1, he was drafted by the St. Louis Cardinals in the rule 5 draft. Conwell made his major league debut on September 22, 1911; he struck out in his only at bat and committed an error on his only chance in the field. That was the last time he played in the majors.

Conwell returned to Portsmouth in 1912 and again had the most hits on the team. For the next two seasons, he continued his steady hitting with batting averages of .299 and .316. The 1915 season was the last that Conwell played for Portsmouth, and he was, in the opinion of one sportswriter, the best third baseman in the Ohio State League.

From 1915 to 1917, Conwell played for the Texas League's Waco Navigators. He batted .281 during his first season there, but his average fell to .245 and then .227. After playing only 12 games in 1918, he finished his professional baseball career with one season for the Evansville Evas of the Illinois–Indiana–Iowa League. He batted a career-high .318 that year and led Evansville with 149 hits. In addition, a fan presented him with a gold watch for being the team's best hitter.

In 1,193 career minor league games, Conwell accumulated 1,227 hits and batted .277. He died in Chicago in 1926.
