= Hap Morse =

American baseball player (1886–1974)

- Shortstop
- Born: December 6, 1886; St. Paul, Minnesota
- Died: June 19, 1974 (aged 87); St. Paul, Minnesota
- Batted: Right Threw: Right

MLB debut
- April 18, 1911, for the St. Louis Cardinals

Last MLB appearance
- April 23, 1911, for the St. Louis Cardinals

MLB statistics
- Games played: 4
- At bats: 8
- Hits: 0
- Stats at Baseball Reference

Teams
- St. Louis Cardinals (1911)

Peter Raymond "Hap" Morse (December 6, 1886 – June 19, 1974) was a shortstop in Major League Baseball. Nicknamed "Pete", he played for the St. Louis Cardinals in 1911.
