= Denney Wilie =

American baseball player (1890–1966)

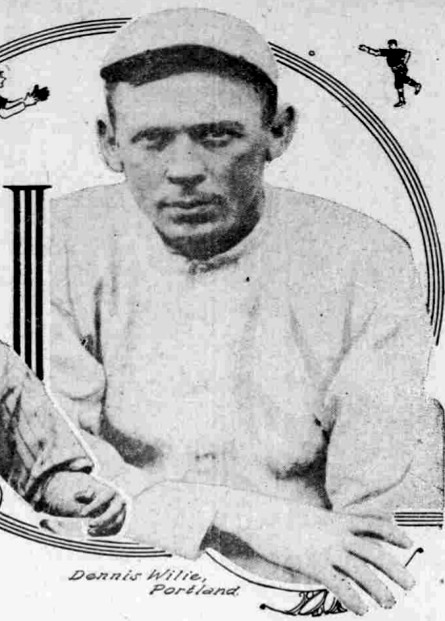
- Outfielder
- Born: September 22, 1890; Mount Calm, Texas, U.S.
- Died: June 20, 1966 (aged 75); Hayward, California, U.S.
- Batted: Left Threw: Left

MLB debut
- July 27, 1911, for the St. Louis Cardinals

Last MLB appearance
- October 3, 1915, for the Cleveland Indians

MLB statistics
- Games played: 103
- At bats: 230
- Hits: 56
- Stats at Baseball Reference

Teams
- St. Louis Cardinals (1911–1912); Cleveland Indians (1915)

Dennis Ernest Wilie (September 22, 1890 – June 20, 1966) was an American Major League Baseball outfielder who played for three seasons. He played for the St. Louis Cardinals from 1911 to 1912 and the Cleveland Indians in 1915. He went to Baylor University and later played in the Pacific Coast League from 1915 to 1923.
