= Walter Schmidt (baseball) =

American baseball player (1887–1973)

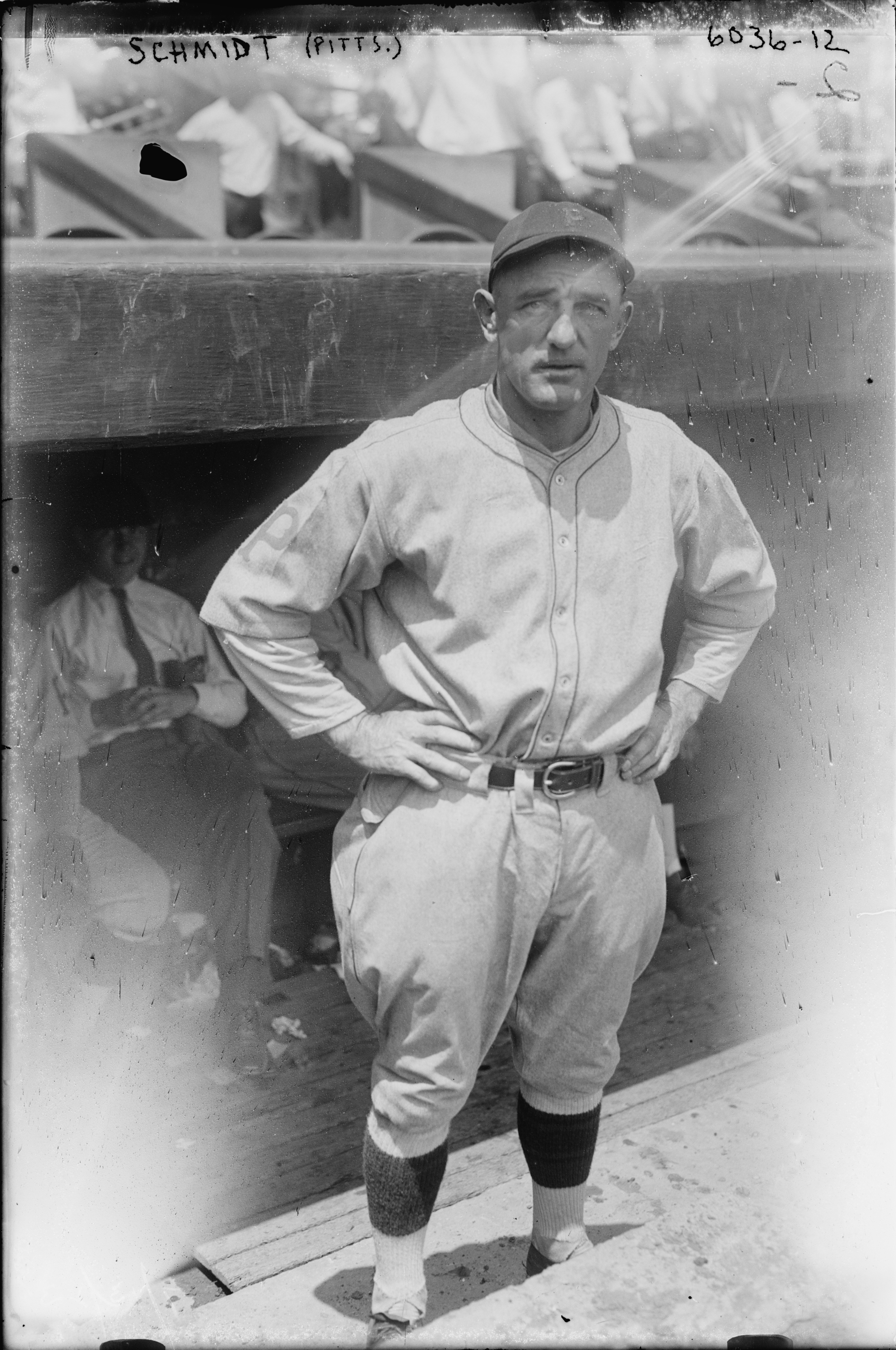
- Schmidt with the Pittsburgh Pirates in 1923
- Catcher
- Born: March 20, 1887; London, Arkansas, U.S.
- Died: July 4, 1973 (aged 86); Modesto, California, U.S.
- Batted: Right Threw: Right

MLB debut
- April 13, 1916, for the Pittsburgh Pirates

Last MLB appearance
- September 7, 1925, for the St. Louis Cardinals

MLB statistics
- Batting average: .257
- Home runs: 3
- Runs batted in: 234
- Stats at Baseball Reference

Teams
- Pittsburgh Pirates (1916–1924); St. Louis Cardinals (1925)

Walter Joseph Schmidt (March 20, 1887 – July 4, 1973) was an American professional baseball player who played catcher in the Major Leagues from 1916–1925. He would play for the Pittsburgh Pirates and St. Louis Cardinals. He later was the player/manager of the Mission Bells of the Pacific Coast League during the 1926 season. His brother, Boss Schmidt, also played professional baseball.

In 766 games over 10 seasons, Schmidt posted a .257 batting average (619-for-2411) with 216 runs, 3 home runs, 234 RBI, 57 stolen bases and 137 bases on balls. Defensively, he finished his career with a .980 fielding percentage. Him and his brother Boss Schmidt were known for their physical strength and toughness.
