= Art Reinholz =

American baseball player (1903–1980)

- Third baseman
- Born: January 27, 1903; Detroit, Michigan
- Died: December 29, 1980 (aged 77); New Port Richey, Florida
- Batted: Right Threw: Right

MLB debut
- September 27, 1928, for the Cleveland Indians

Last MLB appearance
- September 29, 1928, for the Cleveland Indians

MLB statistics
- Batting average: .333
- Home runs: 0
- Runs batted in: 0
- Stats at Baseball Reference

Teams
- Cleveland Indians (1928)

Arthur August Reinholz (January 27, 1903 – December 29, 1980) was a Major League Baseball third baseman who played for one season. He played for the Cleveland Indians for two games during the 1928 Cleveland Indians season.

== Baseball career ==
Reinholz played sandlot ball in Detroit until beginning his professional baseball career in the Virginia State League in 1926. At the end of the 1927 season, he was sold to the Mobile, Alabama club in the Southern Association but injured his leg and was unable to play in Mobile. He was sold to the Winston-Salem Twins the following year. He performed well enough in Winston-Salem that his contract was purchased by the Cleveland Indians in July 1928. On August 5, 1928, the Winston-Salem Journal ran an article with a full-page headline reading "Reinholz Is One of Best Prospects Ever Developed in Piedmont Loop." Frank Spencer reported that he was "one of the best physically built men ever to perform in the Piedmont League" and that baseball critics "listed him as the best third baseman ever seen in" the league.

He was called up by the Indians and made his Major League debut on September 27, 1928. He entered the game in Cleveland as a substitute for future Hall of Famer Joe Sewell and recorded a hit off Ed Morris of the Boston Red Sox in two plate appearances. His final game in the majors came just two days later on September 29.

The following season, the Indians farmed Reinholz out to a minor league team in Terre Haute, Indiana. However, he missed much of the season due to illness. At the start of the 1930 season, still under contract with the Indians, he was sent to play for the Des Moines Demons but did not appear in any professional games that season. He returned to the Winston-Salem Twins for the 1931 season but suffered an arm injury and was relieved of his duties by the start of June. He never played another professional game.

== Personal life and death ==
In 1927, while playing for the Kinston Eagles, Reinholz was reported to also be a faculty member at a bible school in Kinston, North Carolina. Reinholz was reportedly scheduled to marry his wife, Florence, a fellow Detroiter, in Detroit on February 15, 1928.

After his baseball career, Reinholz worked as an accountant for Chrysler. He died on December 30, 1980 at age 77 and was survived by his wife, son and grandchildren.
