= Jim Clark (1910s outfielder) =

American baseball player (1887–1969)

- Center fielder
- Born: December 26, 1887; Brooklyn, New York, U.S.
- Died: March 20, 1969 (aged 81); Beaumont, Texas, U.S.
- Batted: Right Threw: Right

MLB debut
- September 2, 1911, for the St. Louis Cardinals

Last MLB appearance
- May 5, 1912, for the St. Louis Cardinals

MLB statistics
- Batting average: .158
- Home runs: 0
- Runs batted in: 3
- Stats at Baseball Reference

Teams
- St. Louis Cardinals (1911–1912)

James Francis Clark (December 26, 1887 – March 20, 1969) was an American Major League Baseball player who played for the St. Louis Cardinals in 1911 and 1912.
