= Jack Fleischman =

American football player (1901–1988)

Profile
- Position: Guard

Personal information
- Born: August 15, 1901; Monroe, Michigan, U.S.
- Died: April 27, 1988 (aged 86); Monroe, Louisiana, U.S.
- Listed height: 5 ft 6 in (1.68 m)
- Listed weight: 184 lb (83 kg)

Career information
- High school: East Detroit (MI)
- College: Purdue

Career history
- Detroit Panthers (1925–1926); Providence Steam Roller (1927–1929)

Awards and highlights
- NFL champion (1928); Green Bay Press-Gazette All-Pro (1927); Chicago Herald All-Pro (1927)
- Stats at Pro Football Reference

Gofrid Jacob Fleischman (August 15, 1901 – April 27, 1988) was an American professional football player with the Detroit Panthers and the Providence Steam Roller of the National Football League (NFL). He was also named to the Green Bay Press-Gazette and Chicago Herald All-Pro teams in 1927. In 1928, he won an NFL Championship with Providence. Prior to joining the NFL, Jack played college football at Purdue University.

Outside of football, Jack played minor league baseball in 1920 with the Winston-Salem Twins of the Piedmont League.
