= Arnold Hauser (baseball) =

American baseball player (1888–1966)

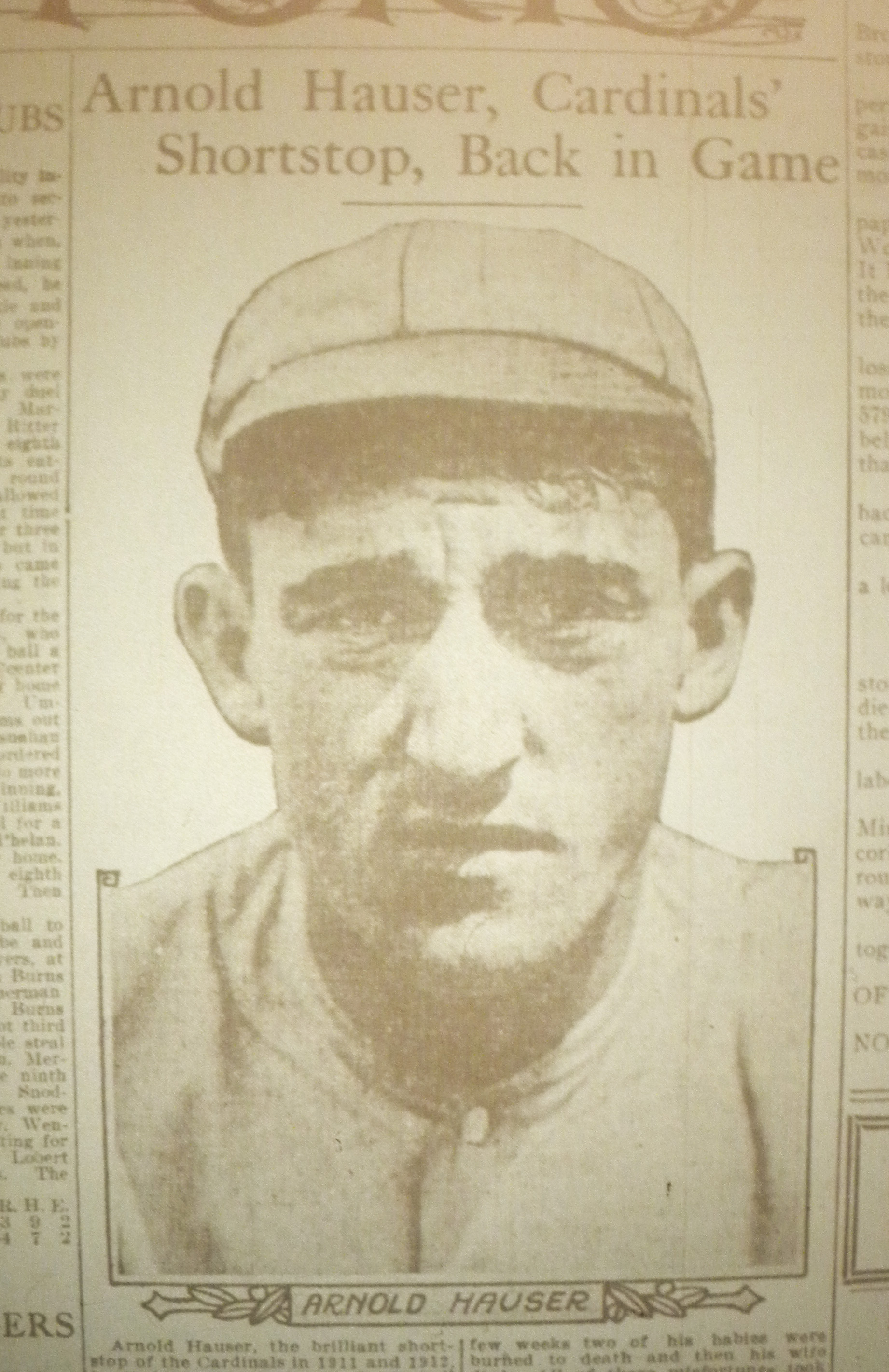
- Hauser in 1915
- Shortstop
- Born: September 25, 1888; Chicago, Illinois, U.S.
- Died: May 22, 1966 (aged 77); Aurora, Illinois, U.S.
- Batted: Right Threw: Right

MLB debut
- April 21, 1910, for the St. Louis Cardinals

Last MLB appearance
- September 29, 1915, for the Chicago Whales

MLB statistics
- Batting average: .238
- Home runs: 6
- Runs batted in: 137
- Stats at Baseball Reference

Teams
- St. Louis Cardinals (1910–1913); Chicago Whales (1915)

Arnold George "Peewee" Hauser (September 25, 1888 – May 22, 1966) was a German American professional baseball player. He played in the major leagues as a shortstop for four seasons during 1910–1915.

== Career ==
Hauser, after starting for the St. Louis Cardinals in 1911 and 1912, was befallen with a series of personal tragedies when in short succession his father and mother died, two children were burned to death in a fire, and his wife died. The tragedies, which took place over the course of just a few weeks, pushed Hauser to the edge of mental breakdown and essentially wrecked Hauser's career.

After being out of baseball for most of 1913 and all of the 1914 season, Hauser unsuccessfully attempted to come back with the Cardinals in 1915. Failing to land with the Cardinals, Hauser played 23 games for the Chicago Whales of the Federal League, ending his career on September 29, 1915.

Hauser was called a "quiet, gentlemanly little chap" and was regarded as a promising talent. During his interrupted 1913 season, Hauser hit a career-best .289 in 22 games played.

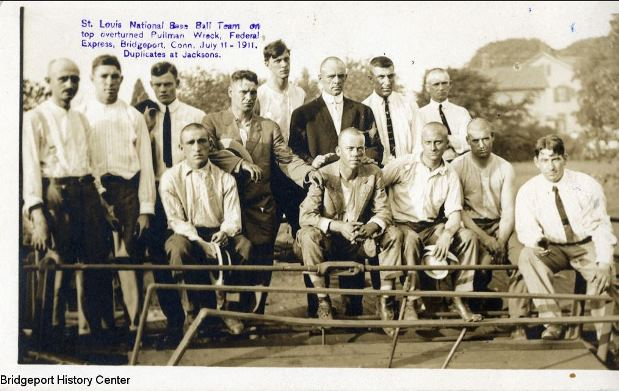
Members of the 1911 St. Louis Cardinals following a train wreck in Bridgeport, Connecticut—Hauser is the left-most seated person, holding a straw hat

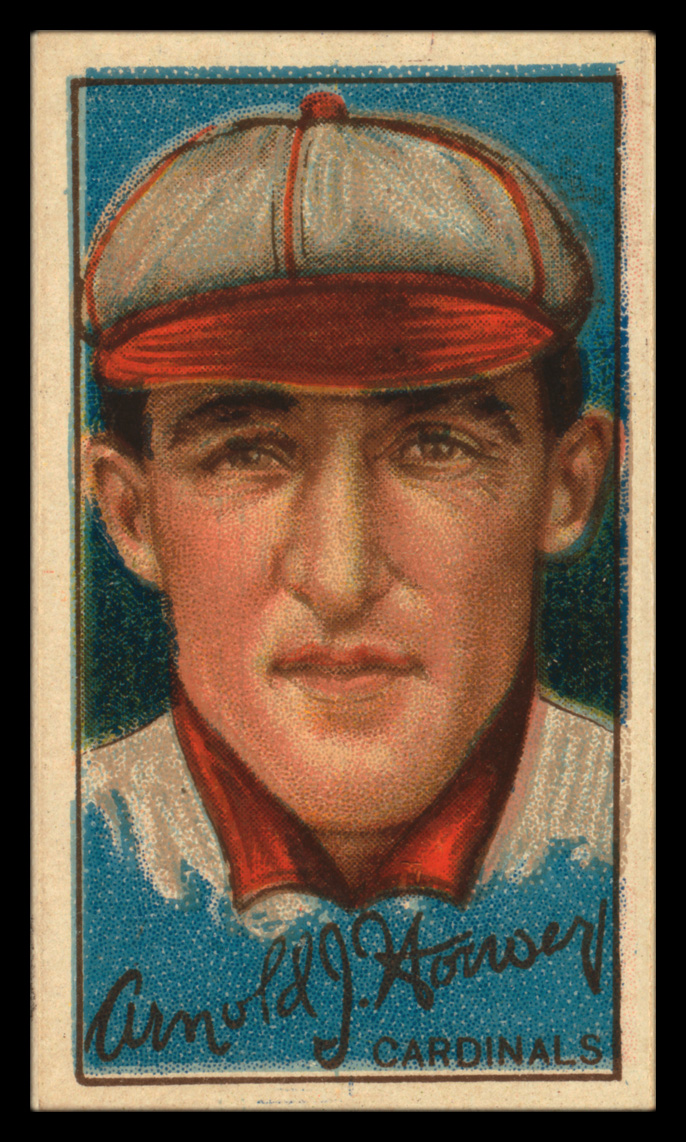
Hauser's 1912 trading card issued by the American Tobacco Company
