= Rabbit Whitman =

American baseball player

- Outfielder
- Born: Hobart Clinton Whitman; December 2, 1897; Tobaccoville, North Carolina
- Died: February 1969 (aged 71); Pfafftown, North Carolina
- Batted: Left Threw: Right
- Stats at Baseball Reference

Hobart Clinton "Rabbit" Whitman (December 2, 1897 – February 1969) was an American professional baseball player.

== Career ==
An outfielder, Whitman spent his career in minor league baseball. He spent eleven of his fourteen professional seasons in the International League and was inducted into the International League Hall of Fame in 2008.

Playing for the Winston-Salem Twins in 1920, Whitman won the Piedmont League batting title, hitting .351 at age 21.

== Personal life ==
In 1931, Whitman married Agnes Krobath.
