= John Brock (baseball) =

American baseball player (1896–1951)

- Catcher
- Born: October 16, 1896; Hamilton, Illinois, US
- Died: October 27, 1951 (aged 55); Clayton, Missouri, US
- Batted: Right Threw: Right

MLB debut
- August 10, 1917, for the St. Louis Cardinals

Last MLB appearance
- September 2, 1918, for the St. Louis Cardinals

MLB statistics
- Batting average: .254
- Home runs: 0
- Hits: 6
- Stats at Baseball Reference

Teams
- St. Louis Cardinals (1917–1918)

John Roy Brock (October 16, 1896 – October 27, 1951) was an American professional baseball player. He played parts of two seasons, 1917 and 1918, in Major League Baseball, primarily as a catcher. Listed at 5 ft 6 1/2 in (1.69 m), 165 lb, Brock batted and threw right-handed. He was born in Hamilton, Illinois.

After playing minor league baseball in 1916, Brock entered the majors in 1917 with the St. Louis Cardinals, appearing for them in seven games while hitting a .400 average (6-for-15). Back in 1918, he hit .212 in 27 games as the third-string catcher behind Mike González and Frank Snyder.

In a two-season career, Brock batted .254 (17-for-67) with three doubles and seven stolen bases, driving in six runs while scoring 13 times.

Brock played 13 minor league seasons between 1916 and 1930, most prominently for the Atlanta Crackers (1923–28), compiling a .256 average in 1310 games. He also managed in the Piedmont and Cotton States leagues in his last baseball season.

Brock died in Clayton, Missouri, at the age of 55.
