= Roy Radebaugh =

American baseball player (1881–1945)

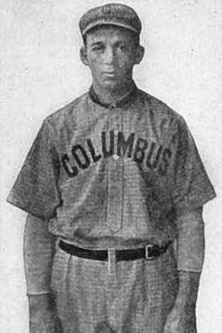
- Pitcher
- Born: February 22, 1881; Champaign, Illinois, U.S.
- Died: January 17, 1945 (aged 63); Cedar Rapids, Iowa, U.S.
- Batted: Right Threw: Right

MLB debut
- September 22, 1911, for the St. Louis Cardinals

Last MLB appearance
- September 28, 1911, for the St. Louis Cardinals

MLB statistics
- Games pitched: 2
- Innings pitched: 10
- Earned run average: 2.70
- Stats at Baseball Reference

Teams
- St. Louis Cardinals (1911)

Roy Radebaugh (February 22, 1881 – January 17, 1945) was an American Major League Baseball pitcher. Radebaugh played for the St. Louis Cardinals in 1911. In 2 career games, he had a 0–0 record with a 2.70 ERA. He batted and threw right-handed.

Radebaugh was born in Champaign, Illinois, and died in Cedar Rapids, Iowa.
