= Jack Reis =

American baseball player (1891–1939)

- Pitcher
- Born: June 14, 1891; Carthage, Ohio, U.S.
- Died: July 20, 1939 (aged 48); Cincinnati, Ohio, U.S.
- Batted: Right Threw: Right

MLB debut
- September 9, 1911, for the St. Louis Cardinals

Last MLB appearance
- October 4, 1911, for the St. Louis Cardinals

MLB statistics
- Games played: 3
- Innings pitched: 9.1
- Earned run average: 0.96
- Stats at Baseball Reference

Teams
- St. Louis Cardinals (1911)

Harrie Crane "Jack" Reis (June 14, 1891 – July 20, 1939) was an American pitcher in Major League Baseball. He played for the St. Louis Cardinals in 1911.
