= Wally Smith (footballer, born 1874) =

English footballer

Personal information
- Full name: Walter Alfred Smith
- Date of birth: 1874
- Place of birth: Lincoln, England
- Date of death: 14 November 1958 (aged 83–84)
- Place of death: Leigh-on-Sea, England
- Height: 5 ft 6 in (1.68 m)
- Position: Inside left

Senior career*
Years	Team	Apps	(Gls)
- Blue Star (Lincoln)
- Grantham Avenue
1900–1903	Lincoln City	90	(21)
1903–1904	Small Heath	0	(0)
1904–1906	Newark		
1906–1907	Brighton & Hove Albion	36	(5)
1907–1908	Norwich City		
1908–1909	Southend United		
- Lincoln Liberal Club
- Sutton Junction
- Mansfield Mechanics
- Mansfield Town
- * Club domestic league appearances and goals

Walter Alfred Smith (1874 – 14 November 1958) was an English footballer who made 90 appearances in the Football League for Lincoln City. He played as an inside left.

Born in Lincoln, Lincolnshire, Smith played local football in the Lincoln area before joining Lincoln City. He scored 23 goals from 99 appearances in senior competition, the last of which was at the end of the 1902–03 season. He joined Second Division club Small Heath, but never made a competitive appearance, and went on to play for Midland League club Newark, Southern League clubs Brighton & Hove Albion, Norwich City and Southend United, and other non-league teams. Smith died in Leigh-on-Sea, Essex, in 1958.
