= Pete Standridge =

American baseball player (1891–1963)

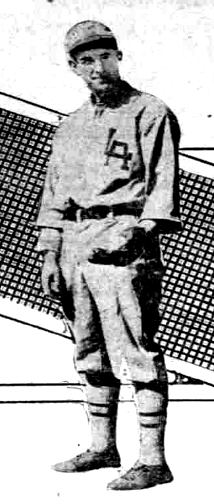
- Pitcher
- Born: April 25, 1891; Black Diamond, Washington, U.S.
- Died: August 2, 1963 (aged 72); San Francisco, California, U.S.
- Batted: Right Threw: Right

MLB debut
- September 19, 1911, for the St. Louis Cardinals

Last MLB appearance
- October 2, 1915, for the Chicago Cubs

MLB statistics
- Win–loss record: 4–1
- Earned run average: 3.85
- Strikeouts: 45
- Stats at Baseball Reference

Teams
- St. Louis Cardinals (1911); Chicago Cubs (1915)

Alfred Peter Standridge (April 25, 1891 – August 2, 1963) was an American pitcher in Major League Baseball. He played for the St. Louis Cardinals and Chicago Cubs. He was later the player/manager of the Edmonton Eskimos in the Western Canada League in 1920.
