= Wally Smith (baseball) =

American baseball player (1888–1930)

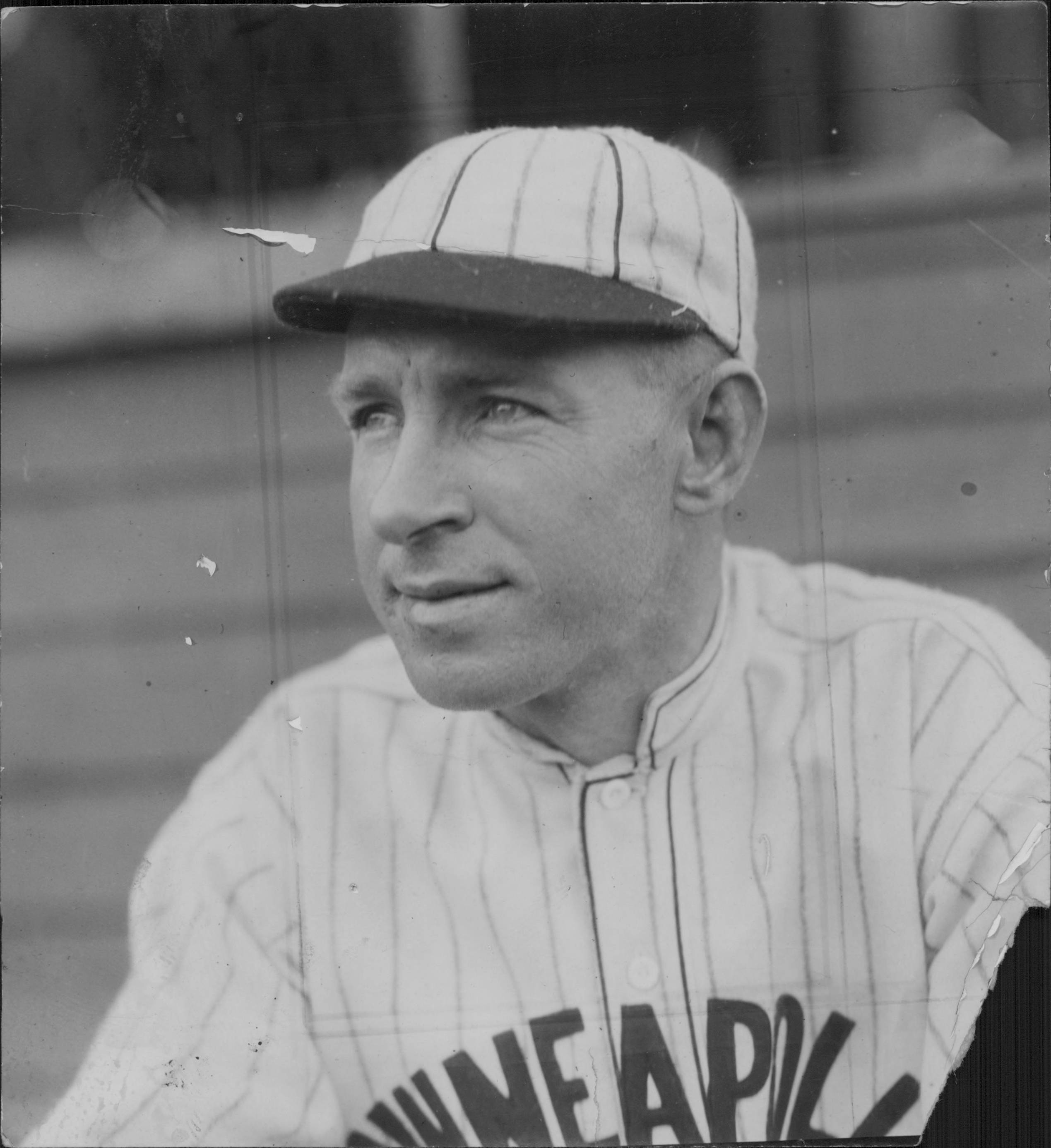
- Smith in a Minneapolis Millers uniform
- Infielder
- Born: March 13, 1888; Philadelphia, Pennsylvania, U.S.
- Died: June 10, 1930 (aged 42); Florence, Arizona, U.S.
- Batted: Right Threw: Right

MLB debut
- April 17, 1911, for the St. Louis Cardinals

Last MLB appearance
- October 7, 1914, for the Washington Senators

MLB statistics
- Games played: 201
- At bats: 584
- Hits: 117
- Batting average: .229
- Stats at Baseball Reference

Teams
- St. Louis Cardinals (1911–1912); Washington Senators (1914)

Wallace Henry Smith (March 13, 1888 – June 10, 1930) was an American professional baseball player. He was an infielder in the major leagues for three seasons during 1911–1914. He was later the player-manager of the St. Joseph Saints in the Western League in 1922 and 1923.

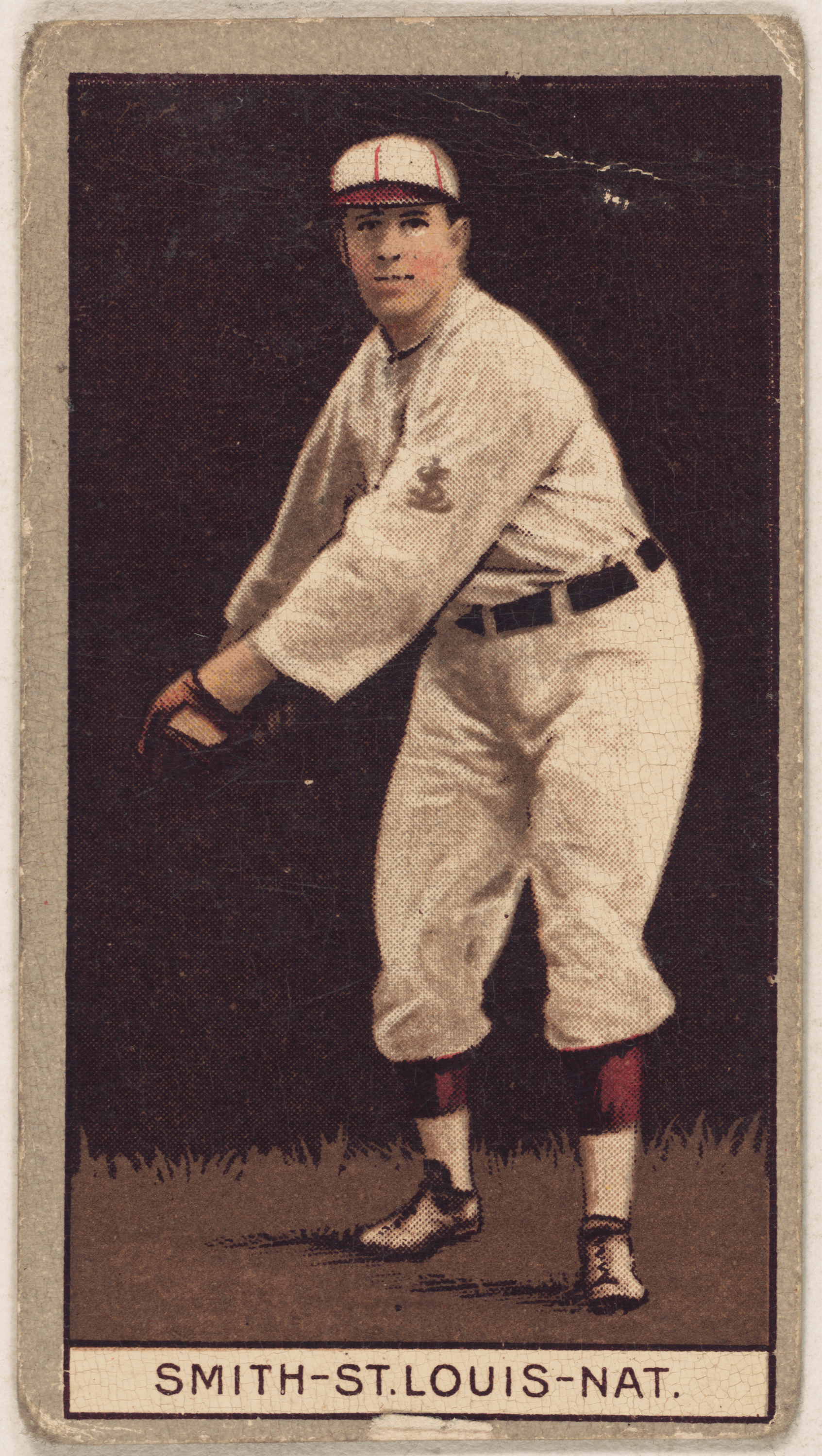
Smith on an American Tobacco Company card

== Sources ==
- Career statistics from Baseball Reference · Baseball Reference (Minors) · Retrosheet · Baseball Almanac
