= Waterloo Microbes =

- 1904–1906; (1895, 1904–1911, 1913–1917); Waterloo, Iowa

Minor league affiliations
- Class: Independent (1895); Class D (1904–1909); Class B (1910–1911); Class D (1913–1917)
- League: Eastern Iowa League (1895); Iowa State League (1904–1907); Central Association (1908–1909); Illinois-Indiana-Iowa League (1910–1911); Central Association (1913–1917)

Major league affiliations
- Team: None

Minor league titles
- League titles (3): 1907; 1908; 1914

Team data
- Name: Waterloo Indians (1895); Waterloo Microbes (1904–1906); Waterloo Cubs (1907); Waterloo Lulus (1908–1909); Waterloo Boosters (1910–1911); Waterloo Jays (1913–1915); Waterloo Shamrocks (1916); Waterloo Lions (1917)
- Ballpark: West End Grounds (1895, 1904–1909); Red Cedar Park (1908–1917)

The Waterloo Microbes were a minor league baseball team based in Waterloo, Iowa. The "Microbes" played as members of the Class D level Iowa State League from 1904 to 1907, winning the 1907 league championship.

After beginning minor league play as a member of the 1895 Eastern Iowa League, Waterloo teams also played as members of the Central Association (1908–1909), Illinois-Indiana-Iowa League (1910–1911) and Central Association (1913–1917), winning league championships in 1908 and 1914.

In the era, Waterloo teams hosted their minor league home games at both the West End Grounds (1895, 1904–1909) and Red Cedar Park (1908–1917).

Baseball Hall of Fame member Rube Marquard played for the Waterloo Microbes.

== History ==
=== 1895: Expelled from Eastern Iowa League ===
Waterloo first hosted minor league play in 1895, when the Waterloo "Indians" team was formed. The new Waterloo team became charter members of the eight-team, independent Eastern Iowa League. Waterloo joined the Burlington Colts, Cedar Rapids Rabbits, Clinton Bridegrooms, Dubuque Giants, Galesburg Trotters, Ottumwa Brownies and Rock Island Tri-Cities teams in league play.

After beginning play, the 1895 Eastern Iowa league had a tumultuous season, as, three teams were "expelled" from the league, with one of the team being expelled twice and another team folding. Waterloo was one of the three teams expelled from the league. On June 14, 1895, both the Clinton Bridegrooms and the Rock Island Tri-Cities teams were expelled from the Eastern Iowa League. Next, on June 25, 1895, the Galesburg Trotters team was folded . On July 4, 1895, the Clinton Bridegrooms were allowed to rejoin the Eastern Iowa League. However, on July 8, 1895, just four days after being reinstated, the Clinton Bridegrooms were expelled from the league for a second time, along with the Waterloo Indians, who were expelled from the Eastern Iowa League the same day. Leading up to their expulsion from the league, Waterloo had compiled a 1895 season record of 21–25, managed to that point by Mike Lawrence.

In the final standings, after Waterloo's expulsion, the Dubuque Giants (66–31), finished in first place in the Eastern Iowa League, which ended the season with four teams. Dubuque won the Eastern Iowa League championship by winning both halves of the league's planned split season schedule, so no playoff was held. Dubuque ended the season 11.0 games ahead of the second place Burlington Colts.

The Eastern Iowa League did not return to minor league play in 1896 and permanently disbanded after the 1895 season was completed on August 25, 1895.

On August 30, 1895, after the Eastern Iowa League season ended, both Dubuque and Burlington continued minor league play in a new league. The two teams immediately joined the Class B level Western Association as expansion teams and were incorporated into the league. The Waterloo team did not continue play in 1895.

After their 1895 season ended in their expulsion from the Eastern Iowa League, Waterloo did not host another minor league team for nine seasons.

=== 1904 to 1907: Waterloo Microbes / Iowa State League ===
Waterloo resumed minor league play in 1904, when the Waterloo "Microbes" were formed. The team became charter members of the Iowa State League. The Iowa State League had the formal name as the "Iowa League of Professional Baseball Clubs". Waterloo joined the newly formed league, which was formed as an eight-team, Class D level league, consisting entirely of franchised based in Iowa. The Microbes joined the Boone Coal Miners, Burlington River Rats, Fort Dodge Gypsum Eaters, Keokuk Indians, Marshalltown Grays, Oskaloosa Quakers and Ottumwa Snappers teams in beginning Iowa State League play on May 6, 1904.

Waterloo being known by the unique "Microbes" nickname is paralleled by the Chicago Cubs franchise being referred to by the nickname in select newspapers during the era. Waterloo next was known by the "Cubs" nickname as well.

In their first Iowa State League season, the Microbes ended the 1904 season as the league runner up. Waterloo ended the season with a record of 64–43 to finish in second place. The Microbes were managed by James Myers, who led the team to a record of 50–36 in his tenure before being replaced by Charles Cole. Waterloo finished 14-7 playing under Cole and no playoffs were held. In the final standings, Waterloo finished 6.5 games behind the first place Ottumwa Snappers in the final standings.

The Microbes continued play in the eight-team Class D level Iowa State League in the 1905 season and finished next to last. Waterloo ended the season seventh place, playing the season under managers Harry Meek and Frank Lohr. With a final record of 56–69, Waterloo ended the season 21.0 games behind the first place Ottumwa Snappers in the final standings, as Ottumwa won their second consecutive league championship, playing under their namesake manager Snapper Kennedy. After his departure from the Microbes, Waterloo player-manager Hank Meek went to Boone as a player to finish the season and won the Iowa State League batting title, hitting .320.

Iowa native and Grinnell College graduate Charlie Frisbee became the Waterloo player-manager in 1906. After beginning his minor league career in 1896 at age 22, Frisbee played in the major leagues for the 1899 Boston Beaneaters and the 1900 New York Giants as a player, posting a .315 batting average in 26 career games, with his major league career shortened by poor fielding in the outfield and a knee injury. Frisbee had ended the 1905 season serving as the third manager of the year for the Burlington Flint Hills, having lost both of his parents in 1905. After beginning the 1906 season as the player-manager for Waterloo, he was claimed Burlington as a player during the season but did not play for them. Frisbee batted .288 in 24 games and 73 at bats for Waterloo. At age 32, his baseball career ended after his release from Waterloo.

The Microbes continued play and Waterloo finished in seventh place in the 1906 Iowa State League. Compiling a record of 48–76, the Microbes finished next to last in the eight-team Class D level league, playing the season under managers Charlie Frisbee and his replacement as manager, Ernest Anklam. Waterloo finished the season 36.0 games behind the first place Burlington Pathfinders, managed by Ned Egan, in the final standings.

Born in Germany, Ernest Anklam was a second baseman who was in his third season with Waterloo. In 1906, at age 26, Anklam batted .214 for Waterloo in 109 games and 384 at bats.

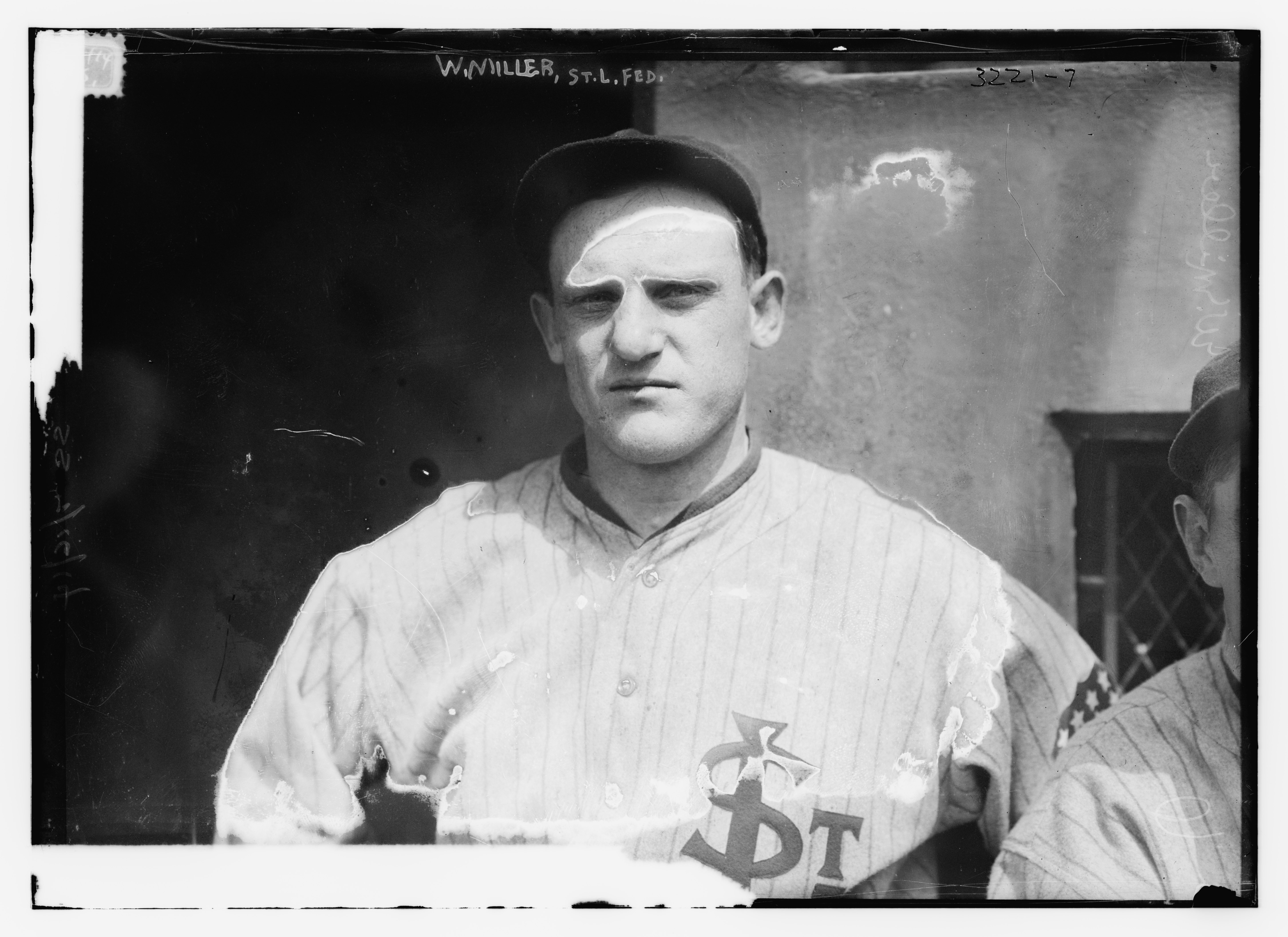
(1914) Ward Miller, St. Louis Terriers. Ward played for Waterloo in 1906, in his first professional season, batting .270.

At age 21, outfielder Ward Miller made his professional debut with Waterloo in 1906 after graduating from Northern Illinois University, hitting .278 in 70 games. In eight seasons playing with the Pittsburgh Pirates (1909), Cincinnati Reds (1909–1910), Chicago Cubs (1912–1913), St. Louis Terriers (1914–1915) and St. Louis Browns (1916–1917), Miller batted .278 with an OBP of .375 and 128 stolen bases in 769 career games.

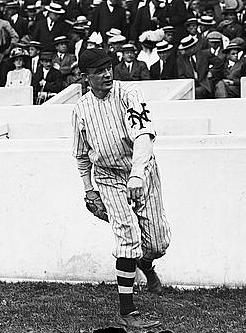
(1912) Baseball Hall of Fame member Rube Marquard, New York Giants. Marquard pitched for Waterloo in his first professional seasons after stowing away on a freight train to reach Waterloo for a tryout with the team.

In 1907 Baseball Hall of Fame member Rube Marquard pitched again for Waterloo in his second professional season. Marquard compiled a record of 23–13 with a 2.01 earned run average (ERA) and led the league in victories. After serving for a few years as a batboy for his hometown Cleveland Naps as a youth, Marquard was recommended to Waterloo for a professional tryout and stowed away on freight trains to reach Waterloo for his tryout in 1906, as he had no money to travel. After a successful tryout Marquard had left the Waterloo team after a dispute with manager Charlie Frisbee over an advance on his salary so he could eat. He had made three successful appearances for the team without any compensation. Marquard made his major league debut in 1908 with the New York Giants, embarking on his 18-season major league career with the Giants, Brooklyn Dodgers, Cincinnati Reds and Boston Braves. Marquard was inducted into the Baseball Hall of Fame in 1971.

At age 30, Frank Boyle became the manager for Waterloo in 1907, beginning a five-season tenure with the franchise that produced two league championships. Previously, Boyle had spent the 1904 to 1906 seasons in the league as the manager of the Fort Dodge Gypsumites, moving to Waterloo after the Fort Dodge franchise was folded following the 1906 season. Boyle managed in the minor leagues thorough the 1925 season, compiling 1233 wins.

After two consecutive seventh-place finishes, Waterloo won the Iowa State League championship in 1907. The franchise continued play in the Iowa State League with a new nickname as the Microbes became known as the "Cubs" for the 1907 season. The Cubs dominated the league with a record of 76–45 and finished in first place in their first season under manager Frank Boyle. Waterloo finished 4.0 games ahead of the second place Burlington Pathfinders in the final standings and 42.0 games ahead of the last place Keokuk Indians.

Iowa native Harry Gaspar first pitched for Waterloo in 1907, compiling an 18–9 record at age 24 in his second professional season. Gaspar returned to Waterloo for the 1908 season and had a notwworthy season.

The Iowa State League was renamed following Waterloo's championship in 1907. The "Iowa State League" did not return to play until reorganizing for a final season in 1912 without a Waterloo franchise.

=== 1908 & 1909: Waterloo Lulus / Central Association ===
Having expanded with franchises outside of Iowa, the Iowa State League changed names in 1908 and became the known as the Central Association. Waterloo also had a new nickname, as the 1908 Waterloo "Lulus" became a charter member of the newly named league. Waterloo joined the Class D level league with the six other teams other that played with them in the 1907 Iowa State League. One new franchise joined in forming the new league. Waterloo joined the Burlington Pathfinders, Jacksonville Lunatics (Jacksonville, Illinois), Keokuk Indians, Oskaloosa Quakers, Ottumwa Packers and the Quincy Gems (Quincy, Illinois), all who had been members of the 1907 Iowa State League. The Kewanee Boilermakers based in Kewanee, Illinois, were a new franchise replacing the Marshalltown Snappers. The new Central Association began their league schedule on May 7, 1908.

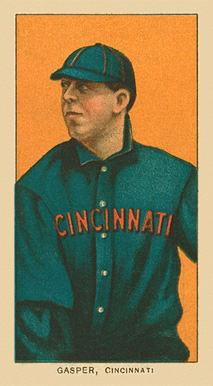
(1909) Harry Gaspar, Cincinnati Reds, baseball card. In his second season with Waterloo, Gaspar had a 32–4 record and a league leading 2.17 ERA in 1908, as Waterloo won their second consecutive championship.

In their first season of play in the newly formed league, the Waterloo Lulus won their second consecutive league championship in the 1908 Central Association. With no playoffs held, Waterloo ended the season schedule 4.5 games ahead of the second place Burlington Pathfinders in the final league standings. Waterloo ended their championship season with a final record of 88–37, while Burlington finished with a normally dominant 83–41 record and the Quincy Gens were in third place 16.5 games behind Waterloo, with last place Ottumwa finishing 41.5 games behind in the eight-team league. No playoffs were held, which was common in the era. Manager Frank Boyle remained in Waterloo, leading Waterloo to a second consecutive league championship.

In his second season with the team, pitcher Harry Gaspar returned to Waterloo for the 1908 season and had a sensational season in helping the Lulus to the championship. Gaspar led the league in wins with a 32–4 record and a league leading 2.17 ERA. After Waterloo's season ended, Gaspar made his major league debut with the Cincinnati Reds in 1909 and remained with the Reds through the 1912 season, before his major league career ended. Gaspar compiled a 2.69 career ERA in 143 games with a 46–48 career record and 14 saves in the major leagues. Gaspar operated a photography business called Gaspar Studio in Le Mars, Iowa and he ran the business full time when his pitching career began to wane following the 1912 season. Gaspar later co-owned and managed the Gaspar-Anderson Bowling Alleys in Santa Ana, California, where he died in 1940.

In defending their league championships from the two prior seasons, the 1909 Waterloo Lulus placed fifth in the eight-team Class D level Central Association. Playing the season under returning manager Frank Boyle, the Lulus had a final record of 64–69 to finish in fifth place in the Central Association final standings. No playoffs were held and first place Burlington finished just 1.0 game ahead of the second place Hannibal Cannibals (83–53) and 10.5 games ahead of fifth place Waterloo in the standings.

A native of Marshalltown, Iowa, pitcher Maury Kent played for Waterloo in 1909, pitching to an 18–16 record at age 23. Kent later pitched in the major leagues before continuing a career in collegiate coaching. Prior to joining Waterloo, Kent had also played football and graduated from the University of Iowa in 1907 and had coached the Iowa Hawkeyes baseball team in 1908. Following his baseball season with Waterloo, Kent became the football coach and baseball coach of the Carlton College teams in 1909 through 1913. In 1912 and 1913, he pitched for the Brooklyn Dodgers, appearing in 23 games total. After ending his baseball career in 1914, Kent resumed collegiate coaching. He was the head basketball coach of the Iowa Hawkeyes men's basketball team (1913–1918), Iowa State Cyclones men's basketball (1920–1921) and Northwestern Wildcats men's basketball teams (1922–1927). He overlapped his basketball coaching with coaching baseball at Iowa, Iowa State and Northwestern. In between, Murray also coached the Wisconsin Badgers baseball team in 1919 and 1920.

Following the 1909 season, the Waterloo franchise left the Class D level Central Association and joined another league at the higher-Class B level. The Monmouth, Illinois based Monmouth Browns were formed and replaced Waterloo in the Class D level 1910 Central Association.

=== 1910 & 1911: Waterloo Boosters / Class B level Illinois–Indiana–Iowa League ===
Waterloo left the Central Association for the 1910 season and became members the eight-team, Class B level Illinois–Indiana–Iowa League league in 1910, replacing the Decatur Commodores franchise in the league. Waterloo became known as the "Boosters." In the era, Class B was the equivalent of today's Class AA level. The returning Bloomington Bloomers, Danville Speakers, Davenport Prodigals, Dubuque Dubs, Peoria Distillers, Rock Island Islanders and Springfield Senators teams joined with Waterloo in beginning the league schedule on May 4, 1910. The Illinois–Indiana–Iowa League was commonly referred to by the shortened Three-I League.

On June 9, 1910, Waterloo turned a triple play in a 5–1 victory over the Springfield Senators. Shortstop Bill Leard and first baseman Grover Beiter 1B completed the play in the game at Waterloo.

In their first season of play in the higher-level league, the Waterloo Boosters ended the Illinois–Indiana–Iowa League season in fourth place. Joining the Class B level league, The Boosters finished the 1910 season with a record of 72–67, managed by their returning manager Frank Boyle. The Boosters finished 7.5 games behind first place Springfield Senators in the final standings.

In their final season playing under manager Frank Boyle, the 1911 Waterloo Boosters placed seventh in the Illinois–Indiana–Iowa League. Ending the season with a record of 59–76, Waterloo ended the season 9.5 games behind the first place Peoria Distillers in the eight-team league.

Following the completion of the 1911 season, the Waterloo Boosters franchise was replaced by the Decatur Commodores in the Class B level Illinois–Indiana–Iowa League. After their exit from the Three-I League, Waterloo did not field a minor league team in 1912, before Waterloo then rejoined their former Class D level league in 1913.

=== 1913 to 1916: Return to Class D level Central Association ===
After not fielding a team in 1912, Waterloo rejoined the eight-team Class D level Central Association in 1913, becoming known as the Waterloo "Jays." With their membership, the Waterloo Jays replaced the Galesburg Pavers in the league. The Waterloo Jays joined the Burlington Pathfinders, Cedar Rapids Rabbits, Keokuk Indians, Kewanee Boilermakers, Monmouth Browns, Muscatine Wallopers and Ottumwa Packers teams as the league schedule began play on April 30, 1913.

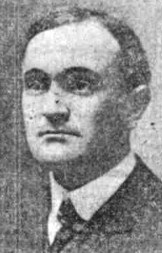
(1903) Doc Andrews, Portland Browns. Andrews was the player-manager for Waterloo from 1913 to 1915, leading the Microbes to the 1914 championship.

With the Waterloo team returning to minor league play, Jay "Doc" Andrews became the Waterloo Jays' manager in 1913 at age 39. Becoming the player-manager for Waterloo, Andrews had last managed the 1911 Kewanee Boilermakers, when he hit .348 for Kewanee before remaining with the Boilermakers as a player in 1912. Andrews was mostly a pinch hitter in his playing tenure with Waterloo.

Pitcher Jesse Tannehill played for Waterloo in 1913 at age 38. With Waterloo, Tannehill did not pitch and batted .232 in 46 games playing the outfield. As a major league pitcher, Tannehill won 197 games against 117 losses with a career ERA of 2.80. Tannehill pitched for the Cincinnati Reds (1894), Pittsburgh Pirates (1897–1902), New York Highlanders (1903), Boston Red Sox (1904–1908), Washington Senators (1908–1909) and Cincinnati Reds (1911) in his major league pitching career. Tannehill had continued playing for minor league teams as an outfielder after his pitching career was ended due to a series of arm injuries. In 1914, after his season with Waterloo, Tannehill became the player-manager of the Portsmouth Truckers of the Virginia League and later he became a coach with the Philadelphia Phillies.

In their return to play in the Class D level league in 1913, the Waterloo Jays finished in last place. The Jays ended the 1913 Central Association season with a record of 53–71 to finish in eighth place under player-manager Doc Andrews. In the eight-team league, Waterloo ended the season 18.0 games behind the first place Ottumwa Packers, who were managed by future Waterloo manager Ned Egan.

At age 30, catcher Bruce Evans played for Waterloo in 1914. Evans began his playing career in the minor leagues in 1904 and would play the 1916 season in the Kansas City All Nations touring team. Evans batted .279 in 74 games for Waterloo in 1914.

The 1914 Waterloo Jays went from last place to first place. Waterloo became the Central Association champion, one season after finishing in eighth place in the eight-team league. Managed by the returning Jay "Doc" Andrews, the Jays ended the season with a final record of 78–51. Finishing in first place, Waterloo ended the season 2.5 games ahead of the second place Burlington Pathfinders and 28.5 games ahead of the eighth place Galesburg Pavers in the final standings.

As defending league champions, the 1915 Waterloo Jays ended the Central Association season in seventh place. The Jays began the season under the returning Doc Andrews as manager before Andrews was replaced by player Eddie Brennan as manager. The Jays ended the season with a record of 52–74 and finished 32.5 games behind the first place Burlington Pathfinders in the league standings. A catcher Eddie Brennan took over as the Waterloo manager during the 1915 season, and at age 29 Brennan batted .205 in 103 games for Waterloo. Paddy Siglin of Waterloo won the Central Association batting title, hitting .322 on the season. During the season, Siglin was purchased from Waterloo by the Pittsburgh Pirates and made his major league debut on September 12, 1915.

Pitcher Tom Drohan, played for Waterloo in 1914 and 1915, after having made his major league debut with the 1913 Washington Senators. Drohan had a lengthy tenure of pitching in the league. In 1911, Drohan pitched for the Central Association's Kewanee Boilermakers, with a record of 19–10. In 1912 with Kewanee he had a record of 24–6. In 1913 Tom Drohan pitched in the major leagues with the Washington Senators. He then returned to the Central Association in 1914 with the Waterloo Jays and went 15–7 that season and 14–17 for Waterloo in 1915. Following his two seasons with Waterloo, Drohan pitched for the Central Association's Clinton Pilots in 1916, where his brother James Drohan was the manager.

Tom Drohan, played for Waterloo in both 1914 and 1915. Drohan had made his major league debut with the 1913 Washington Senators before joining Waterloo. In 1911, Drohan pitched for the Central Association's Kewanee Boilermakers, with a record of 19–10. In 1912 with Kewanee he had a record of 24–6. In 1913 Tom Drohan pitched in the major leagues with the Washington Senators. He then returned to the Central Association in 1914 with the Waterloo Jays and went 15–7 for Waterloo that season and 14–17 in 1915. Drohan next pitched for the Clinton Pilots in 1916.

In 1916, Eddie Brennan returned as the player-manager for Waterloo, as the team became known as the "Shamrocks" in continuing play in the eight-team Class D level Central Association. The Waterloo Shamrocks ended the season in fifth place. Waterloo ended the season with a final record of 58–63, finishing 18.0 games behind the first place Marshalltown Ansons. In 49 games as a player, manager Eddie Brennan batted .242.

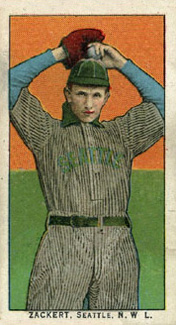
(1911) George Zackert, Seattle Giants baseball card. Zackert pitched for Waterloo teams in the 1907, 1909, 1915 and 1916 seasons.

At age 31, George Zackert pitched his final minor league season for Waterloo in 1916. Zackert had also pitched for Waterloo teams in the 1907, 1909 and 1915 seasons. Zackert compiled a 18–10 record with a 2.15 ERA in 1916, pitching 251 innings in 36 games. In the 1911 and 1912 seasons, Zackert pitched briefly for the St. Louis Cardinals.

=== 1917: Final Central Association season ===
Ned Egan was named as the Waterloo manager for the 1917 season, as the team became known as the Waterloo "Lions." The 1917 season with Waterloo was his final season. Eagan came to Waterloo after managing the 1916 Muscatine Muskies, who finished in last place after 34 Muscatine wins were reversed by the league. Egan had been in the Central Association as a manager since the league began in 1908, winning four league championships the Burlington Pathfinders and Ottumwa Speedboys. Egan managed sixteen total seasons in the minor leagues through the 1917 season with the Waterloo Lions when he was 39. Following his final season with Waterloo, Ned Egan died on May 6, 1918, at age 40 in Chicago, Illinois after being signed to manage the 1918 [Milwaukee Brewers. Due to his successes in the minor leagues, Egan was nicknamed as the "Connie Mack of the minors." Egan was found dead in his room at the Grand Pacific Hotel having been despondent over his ill health. Egan had sustained a major back injury from a collision while ice skating near his home in Minnesota. The injury left him unable to manage and he had resigned his 1918 managerial position and 3-year contract with the Milwaukee Brewers.

Third baseman Ralph Miller played for Waterloo both the in 1916 and 1917 seasons. After hitting .250 for Waterloo in 1916, Miller batted .308 For the Lions in 90 games in 1917, before being acquired by the Class B level Fort Wayne Chiefs for 18 games to finish the season. Miller first played for the Philadelphia Phillies in the major leagues and played for the 1924 World Series champion Washington Senators, with his final major league appearances occurring during the World Series, where he had 2 RBIs in four games during the series.

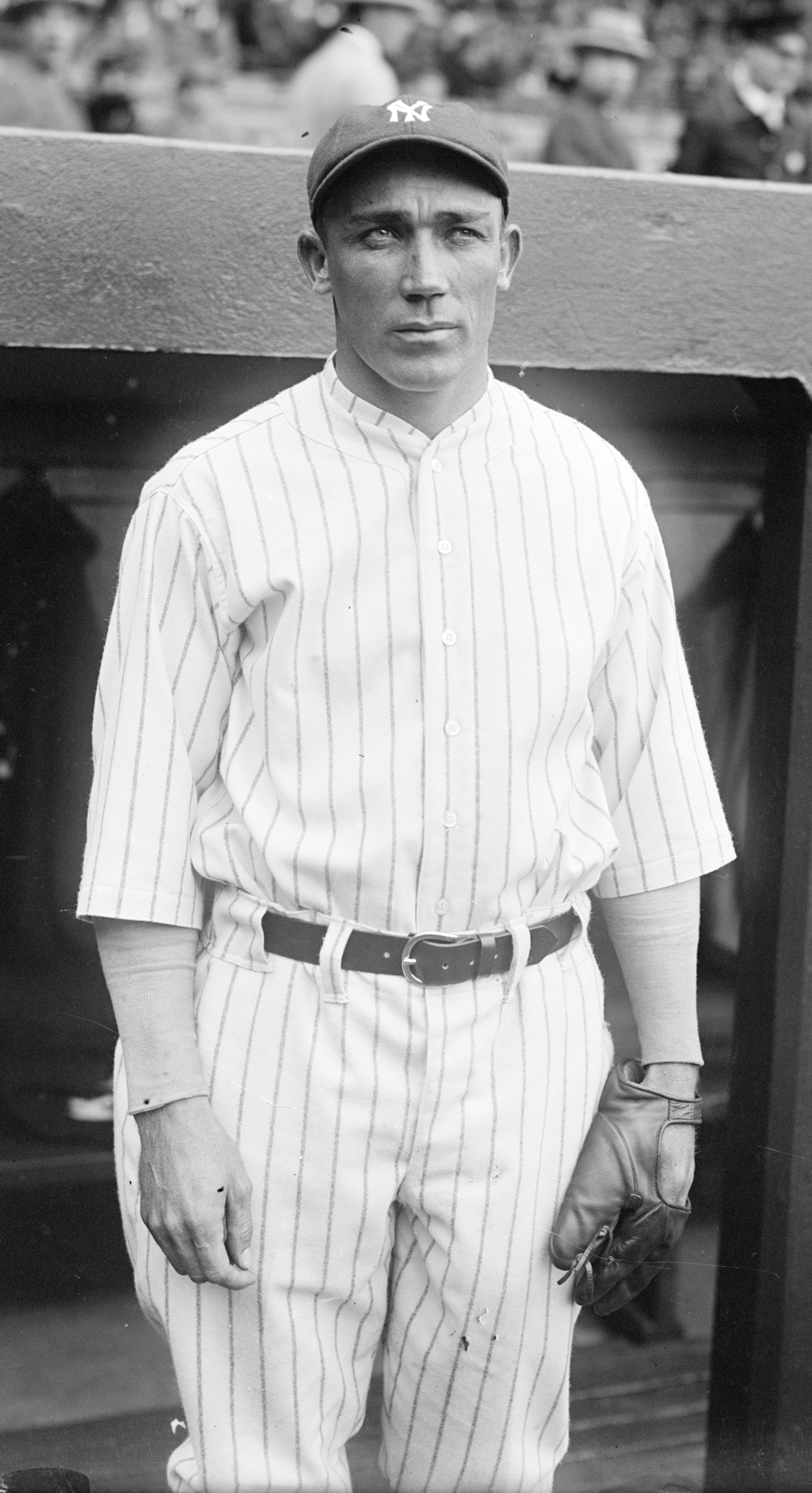
(1925) Ben Paschal, New York Yankees. Paschal played for Waterloo in their partial 1917. He compiled a .309 batting average and .857 OPS in his major league career.

Outfielder Ben Paschal played for the Waterloo Lions in 1917, batting .230 in 23 games before finishing the season with the Muskegon Muskies. Paschal had played briefly with the 1915 Cleveland Indians, appearing in 9 games for Cleveland at age 19. Paschal played on the 1928 World Series champion New York Yankees and also appeared in the 1926 World Series with the Yankees. In eight major league seasons with Cleveland, the Boston Red Sox (1920) and the Yankees (1924–1929), Paschal compiled a .309 batting average and .857 OPS in 364 career games. With the Yankees, Paschal was a backup to Baseball Hall of Fame outfielders Babe Ruth and Earle Combs as well as Bob Meusel and was cited as a poor fielder. When the Yankees wore uniform numbers for the first time in 1929, Paschal was issued number 25 as the final man on the New York roster.

Waterloo became known as the "Lions" in 1917, and the team played a shortened season, as the Central Association folded on August 7, 1917, before the completion of the league schedule. In the era before every team had a formal nickname, the 1917 Waterloo team was also referred to as the "Loons." During the season, the Central Association experienced great volatility among its member teams, as the Dubuque Dubs franchise moved Charles City, Iowa to become the Charles City Tractorites on July 4, 1917. Both the Clinton Pilots and La Crosse Infants teams folded on July 17, 1917. Finally, the Cedar Rapids Rabbits moved to Clear Lake, Iowa on July 27, 1910, finishing the season as the Clear Lake Rabbits. After the Central Association lost two teams and had two others relocate, the league schedule was ended prematurely on August 7, 1917, with permission from the National Association. At the time the league folded, the Lions had compiled a record of 50–42 to finish in third place among the six remaining teams. Playing the shortened season under manager Ned Egan, Waterloo finished 11.0 games behind the first place Marshalltown Ansons in the final standings.

After the folding of the Central Association in 1917, Waterloo next hosted minor league baseball in 1922 when the Waterloo Hawks began a tenure of play as members of the Class D level Mississippi Valley League.

== The ballparks ==
From 1895 to 1909, Waterloo hosted minor league home games at the West Side Grounds.

In 1908, Waterloo began playing some home games at Red Cedar Park. The team moved to the ballpark exclusively in 1910. The Red Cedar Park hosted Waterloo minor league games through 1932. The ballpark was located at West Mullan Avenue and Commercial Street in Waterloo, Iowa.

== Timeline ==
Year(s)	# Yrs.	Team	Level	League	Ballpark
1895	1	Waterloo Indians	Independent	Eastern Iowa League	West End Grounds
1904–1906	3	Waterloo Microbes	Class D	Iowa State League	West End Grounds
1907	1	Waterloo Cubs	Class D	Iowa State League	West End Grounds
1908–1909	2	Waterloo Lulus	Class D	Central Association	West End Grounds
1910–1911	2	Waterloo Boosters	Class B	Illinois-Indiana-Iowa League	Red Cedar Park
1913–1915	3	Waterloo Jays	Class D	Central Association	Red Cedar Park
1916	1	Waterloo Shamrocks	Class D	Central Association	Red Cedar Park
1917	1	Waterloo Lions	Class D	Central Association	Red Cedar Park

== Year–by–year records ==
Year	Record	Finish	Manager	Playoffs/notes
1895	21–25	NA	Mike Lawrence	Expelled July 8
1904	64–43	2nd	James Myers (50–36) / Charles Cole (14–7)	No playoffs held
1905	56–69	7th	Harry Meek / Frank Lohr	No playoffs held
1906	48–76	7th	Charlie Frisbee / Ernest Anklam	No playoffs held
1907	76–45	1st	Frank Boyle	No playoffs held League champions
1908	88–37	1st	Frank Boyle	No playoffs held League champions
1909	64–69	5th	Frank Boyle	No playoffs held
1910	72–67	4th	Frank Boyle	No playoffs held
1911	59–76	7th	Frank Boyle	No playoffs held
1913	53–71	8th	Jay "Doc" Andrews	No playoffs held
1914	78–51	1st	Doc Andrews	No playoffs held League champions
1915	52–74	7th	Doc Andrews / Eddie Brennan	No playoffs held
1916	58–63	5th	Eddie Brennan	No playoffs held
1917	50–42	3rd	Ned Egan	League folded August 7 No playoffs held

== Notable alumni ==
- Rube Marquard (1906–1907) Inducted Baseball Hall of Fame, 1971
- Bob Clemens (1911)
- John Donahue (1916)
- Tom Drohan (1914)
- Mutz Ens (1916)
- Bruce Evans (1914)
- Patsy Flaherty (1916)
- Charlie Frisbee (1906, MGR)
- Ed Gagnier (1905)
- Harry Gaspar (1907–1908)
- Tom Hess (1904)
- Herbert Hill (1913–1914)
- Fred Hofmann (1916)
- Jesse Hoffmeister (1905)
- Billy Kelsey (1906)
- Maury Kent (1909)
- Ed Kinsella (1914)
- Bill Leard (1910)
- Adrian Lynch (1917)
- Ike McAuley (1913–1914)
- Guy McFadden (1895)
- Lee Magee (1907–1908)
- Benny Meyer (1904)
- Ralph Miller (1916–1917)
- Ward Miller (1906)
- George Orme (1915–1916)
- Red Ormsby (1914)
- Ed Pabst (1895)
- Ben Paschal (1917)
- Harry Patton (1910)
- Bugs Raymond (1904)
- Ray Rolling (1909)
- Hank Severeid (1909)
- Paddy Siglin (1913–1914)
- Jesse Tannehill (1913) NL ERA leader
- Bill Wagner (1914)
- Bull Wagner (1909)
- George Zackert (1907–1908 1915–1916)

== See also ==
- Waterloo Indians players
- Waterloo Microbes players
- Waterloo Cubs players
- Waterloo Lulus players
- Waterloo Boosters players
- Waterloo Jays players
- Waterloo Shamrocks players
- Waterloo Lions players
