= Oskaloosa Quakers =

Minor league baseball team in Iowa, US

- 1904–1908; Oskaloosa, Iowa

Minor league affiliations
- Class: Class D (1904–1908)
- League: Iowa State League (1904–1907); Central Association (1908)

Major league affiliations
- Team: None

Minor league titles
- League titles (0): None

Team data
- Name: Oskaloosa Quakers (1904–1908)
- Ballpark: Unknown (1904–1908)

The Oskaloosa Quakers were a minor league baseball team based in Oskaloosa, Iowa. From 1904 to 1908, the "Quakers" played as members of two Class D level leagues; the Iowa State League from 1904 to 1907 and the 1908 Central Association. The Quakers were the only minor league team hosted in Oskaloosa.

== History ==
The 1904 Oskaloosa Quakers began minor league baseball play as charter members of the eight–team, Class D level Iowa State League. The league was formally known as the "Iowa League of Professional Baseball Clubs." The Boone Coal Miners, Burlington River Rats, Fort Dodge Gypsum Eaters, Keokuk Indians, Marshalltown Grays, Ottumwa Standpatters and Waterloo Microbes joined Oskaloosa as charter members.

The Oskaloosa use of the "Quakers" derives from local culture and history. Quakers roots are strong in Oskaloosa, as the local William Penn University was founded by the Quaker based Religious Society of Friends in 1873.

The 1904 Oskaloosa Quakers finished their first season of play with record of 38–69, placing seventh in the eight–team Iowa State League. The Oskaloosa managers were William Filley and Red Donahue. The Quakers had total home season attendance of 16,620, an average of 311 per game.

The 1904 Iowa State League inaugural standings were led by the Ottumwa Snappers (70–36), followed by the Waterloo Microbes (64–43), Marshalltown Grays (60–49) Keokuk Indians (58–50), Ft. Dodge Gypsum Eaters (57–52, Boone Coal Miners (50–61), Oskaloosa Quakers (38–69) and Burlington River Rats (36–73). Oskaloosa finished 32.5 games behind the first place Ottumwa Snappers.

Continuing play in 1905, Oskaloosa placed fourth in the Iowa State League final standings, finishing 10.0 games behind the first place Ottumwa Snappers. Playing under manager Howdy Cassiboinehe, the Quakers had a record of 65–56. The home attendance for the 1905 season was 23,256.

The 1906 Oskaloosa Quakers were runners–up in the Iowa State League standings. With a record of 75–49, Oskaloosa placed second in the eight–team Iowa State League, ending the season 9.0 games behind the champion Burlington Pathfinders. The Quakers were managed by Ham Patterson in 1906. On September 16, 1906, the Quakers' Fred Steele pitched a no–hitter against the Waterloo Microbes, as Oskaloosa won the game 1–0.

In the 1907 Iowa State League standings, Oskaloosa finished in third place. The league would change names after the 1907 season. Managed again by Ham Peterson, the Oskaloosa Quakers ended the season with a 70–55 record, finishing 9.5 games behind the Iowa State League champion Waterloo Cubs. The 1907 Oskaloosa season home attendance was 22,585.

The Oskaloosa Quakers played their final season in 1908. Before the 1908 season, the Iowa State League changed its name to the Central Association, remaining as a Class D level league with eight teams, seven of whom had played in the Iowa State League. The Quakers finished with a 1908 final regular season record of 51–75. Oskaloosa placed sixth in the Central Association League standings. Playing the season under managers Snapper Kennedy and Tay Kensel, the Quakers finished 37.5 games behind the first place Waterloo Lulus. Following the 1908 season, the Oskaloosa franchise folded. Oskaloosa was replaced by the Hannibal Cannibals in the 1909 Central Association.

Oskaloosa, Iowa has not hosted another minor league team.

== The ballpark ==
The name of the Oskaloosa Quakers' home minor league ballpark name is not known. The Edmundson Park site and the current Keating Jaycee Park were both in existence during the era. Today, Keating Jaycee Park is located at the intersection of South I Street and 4th Avenue West, Oskaloosa, Iowa.

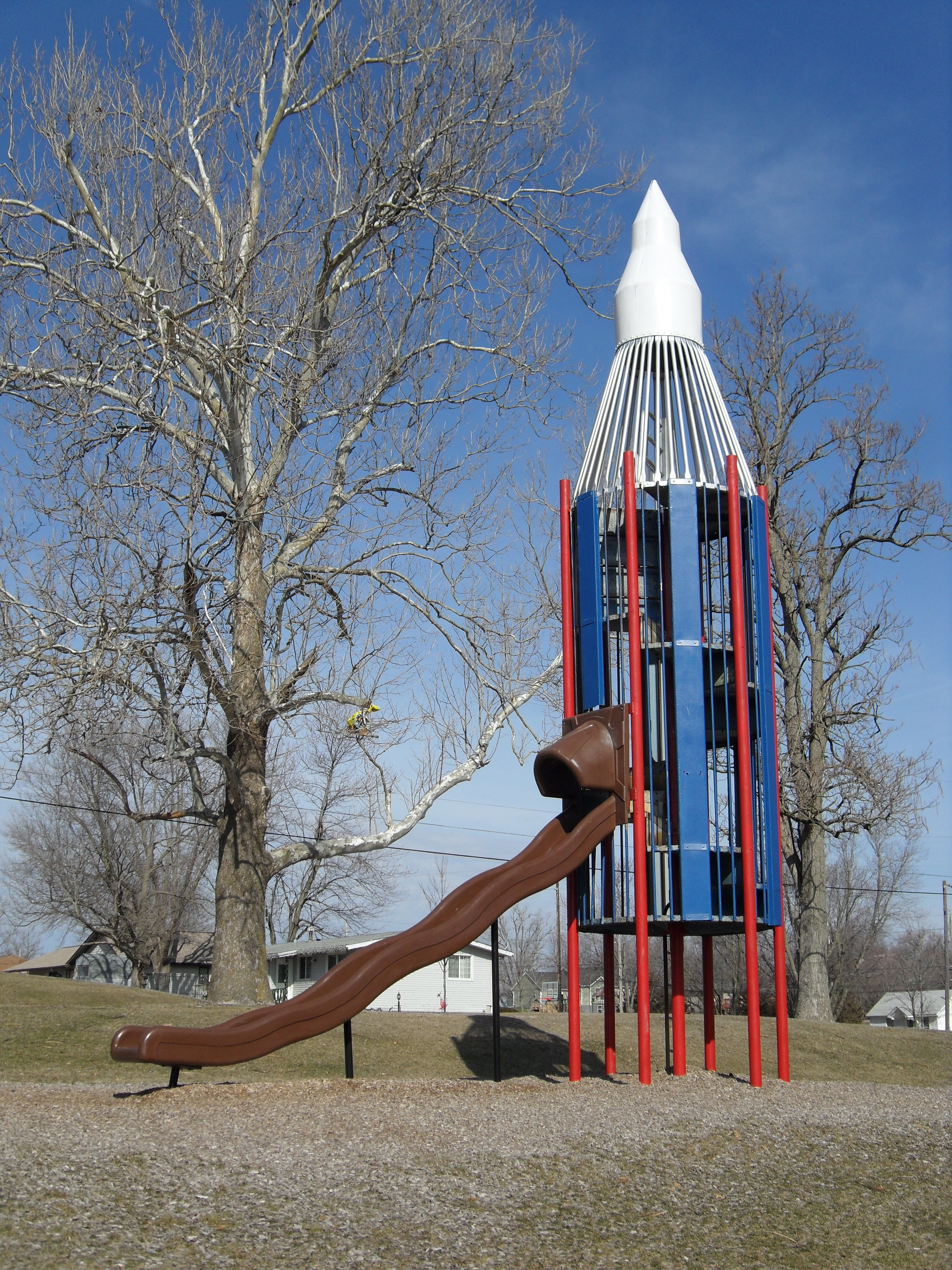
(2013) Edmundson Park. Oskaloosa, Iowa

== Timeline ==
Year(s)	# Yrs.	Team	Level	League
1904–1907	4	Oskaloosa Quakers	Class D	Iowa State League
1908	1	Oskaloosa Quakers	Class D	Central Association

== Year-by-year records ==
Year	Record	Finish	Manager	Playoffs
1904	38–69	7th	William Filley / Red Donahue	No playoffs held
1905	64–56	4th	Howard Cassibone	No playoffs held
1906	75–49	2nd	Ham Patterson	No playoffs held
1907	70–55	3rd	Ham Patterson	No playoffs held
1908	51–75	6th	Snapper Kennedy / Taylor Kensel	No playoffs held

== Notable alumni ==
- Paddy Baumann (1908)
- Dad Clarke (1905)
- Red Donahue (1904, MGR)
- Red Fischer (1907–1908)
- Jesse Hoffmeister (1906)
- Tom Hess (1905)
- Snapper Kennedy (1908, MGR)
- Maury Kent (1908)
- Wally Mattick (1906–1907)
- Ham Patterson (1904–1907, MGR)
- Clay Perry (1905)
- Jim Scott (1907)
- Joe Zalusky (1904)

== See also ==
- Oskaloosa Quakers players
