= Iowa State League =

- Classification: Class D (1904–1907); Independent (1912)
- Sport: Minor League Baseball
- First season: 1904
- Folded: 1912
- Replaced by: Central Association
- President: Frank S. Norton (1904-1905); L.S. Peckham (1906-1907); D.M. Conroy (1912); James Williams (1912)
- No. of teams: 15
- Country: United States of America
- Most titles: 2 Ottumwa Snappers (1904–1905)
- Related competitions: Southwest Iowa League; Illinois–Indiana–Iowa League

The Iowa State League was a minor league baseball league that played from 1904 to 1907 and again in 1912. The Class D level league had franchises based in Illinois and Iowa. The Ottumwa Snappers franchise won league championships in 1904 and 1905. In 1908, the Iowa State League evolved to become the Central Association.

== History ==
The Iowa State League began play in 1904 as an eight-team Class D level minor league in and around Iowa, United States. The league played four seasons and ceased operations following the 1907 season. Seven of the eight 1907 Iowa State League teams formed the Central Association in 1908. The Iowa State League had the formal name as the Iowa League of Professional Baseball Clubs.

The Iowa State League reformed in 1912 as an Independent league. Estherville defeated Fort Dodge in the league playoffs to claim the championship. The league permanently folded after the season.

== Cities represented ==
- Boone, Iowa – Boone Coal Miners (1904), Boone Greyhounds (1905), Boone Miners (1906)
- Burlington, Iowa – Burlington River Rats (1904), Burlington Flint Hills (1905), Burlington Pathfinders (1906–1907)
- Clear Lake, Iowa – Clear Lake Fish Eaters (1912)
- Clinton, Iowa – Clinton Miners (1906)
- Emmetsburg, Iowa – Emmetsburg (1912)
- Estherville, Iowa – Estherville (1912)
- Fort Dodge, Iowa – Fort Dodge Gypsum Eaters (1904), Fort Dodge Gypsumites (1905–1906), Fort Dodge Boosters (1912)
- Jacksonville, Illinois – Jacksonville Lunatics (1907)
- Keokuk, Iowa – Keokuk Indians (1904–1907)
- Marshalltown, Iowa – Marshalltown Grays (1904–1905), Marshalltown Brownies (1906), Marshalltown Snappers (1906)
- Mason City, Iowa – Mason City Cementmakers (1912)
- Oskaloosa, Iowa – Oskaloosa Quakers (1904–1907)
- Ottumwa, Iowa – Ottumwa Snappers (1904–1905), Ottumwa Champs (1906), Ottumwa Packers (1907)
- Quincy, Illinois – Quincy Gems (1907)
- Waterloo, Iowa – Waterloo Microbes (1904–1906), Waterloo Cubs (1907)

== Standings & statistics ==
=== 1904 to 1907 ===
1904 Iowa State League
schedule

Team standings	W	L	PCT	GB	Attend	Managers
Ottumwa Snappers	70	36	.660	-	17,630	Snapper Kennedy
Waterloo Microbes	64	43	.598	6½	18,695	James Myers / Charles Cole
Marshalltown Grays	60	49	.550	11.½	23,117	Robert Warner
Keokuk Indians	58	50	.537	13	15,741	Tom Hackett
Ft. Dodge Gypsum Eaters	57	52	.523	14½	13,582	Frank Boyle
Boone Coal Miners	50	61	.450	22½	16,581	Thomas Reynolds / Walter Holcomb; O.P. DePew
Oskaloosa Quakers	38	69	.355	32½	16,620	William Tilley / Red Donahue
Burlington River Rats	36	73	.330	35½	21,352	F.L. Sullivan / George Stovall; Bob Black

Player statistics
Player	Team	Stat	Tot	Player	Team	Stat	Tot
Snapper Kennedy	Ottumwa	BA	.325	Louis Schaub	Ottumwa	W	23
Snapper Kennedy	Ottumwa	Hits	142	Louis Schaub	Ottumwa	SO	298
Joe Beaver	Ottumwa	Runs	76	Louis Schaub	Ottumwa	Pct	.767; 23-7
Al Spencer	Ottumwa	Runs	76				

1905 Iowa State League
schedule

Team standings	W	L	PCT	GB	Attend	Managers
Ottumwa Snappers	74	45	.621	-	22,261	Snapper Kennedy
Ft. Dodge Gypsumites	73	49	.599	2½	19,270	Frank Boyle
Boone Greyhounds	65	54	.546	9	19,588	Frank Haller
Oskaloosa Quakers	65	56	.537	10	22,256	Howard Cassiboine
Keokuk Indians	59	62	.488	16	18,931	Ned Egan
Marshalltown Grays	55	66	.454	20	NA	Bobby Warner
Waterloo Microbes	56	69	.448	21	19,754	Harry Meek / Frank Lohr
Burlington Flint Hills	37	83	.368	37½	26,635	Rusty Owens / Thomas Reynolds; Charlie Frisbee

Player statistics
Player	Team	Stat	Tot	Player	Team	Stat	Tot
Harry Meek	Waterloo/Boone	BA	.320	Harry Corns	Boone	W	25
Harry Meek	Waterloo/Boone	Hits	152	Melvin Blexurd	Keokuk	SO	207
John Bassey	Boone	Runs	83	Fred Steel	Oskaloosa	Pct	.857; 18-3
Red Fisher	Boone	Runs	83				

1906 Iowa State League
schedule

Team Standings	W	L	PCT	GB	Managers
Burlington Pathfinders	83	39	.680	-	Ned Egan
Oskaloosa Quakers	75	49	.605	9	Ham Patterson
Fort Dodge Gypsumites	68	49	.581	12½	Frank Boyle
Marshalltown Brownies	65	55	.542	17	Rollo Brown
Keokuk Indians	53	67	.442	24	Pat McAndrews
Boone Miners/Clinton Miners	46	70	.397	34	William Wooley / Pat Ryan; Harold Johnson
Waterloo Microbes	48	76	.387	36	Charlie Frisbee / Ernest G. Anklam
Ottumwa Champs	44	77	.364	38½	William Niles / William Everett

Boone moved to Clinton July 14.

Player statistics
Player	Team	Stat	Tot	Player	Team	Stat	Tot
Bill Davidson	Ft. Dodge	BA	.344	Frank Shaw	Oscaloosa	W	29
Cy Neighbors	Burlington	Hits	161	Joe Bills	Keokuk	SO	209
Cy Neighbors	Burlington	Runs	96	Frank Dick	Marshalltown	Pct	.857; 18-3

1907 Iowa State League
schedule

Team Standings	W	L	PCT	GB	Attend	Managers
Waterloo Cubs	79	45	.637	-	27,992	Frank Boyle
Burlington Pathfinders	77	51	.602	4	43,420	Ned Egan
Oskaloosa Quakers	70	55	.560	9½	22,585	Ham Patterson
Jacksonville Lunatics	63	61	.508	16	29,448	Frank Belt
Marshalltown Snappers	62	61	.504	16½	14,992	Snapper Kennedy
Quincy Gems	61	66	.480	19½	37,000	Harry Hofer
Ottumwa Packers	51	74	.408	28½	24,974	Jack Corbett
Keokuk Indians	39	89	.305	42	20,760	Cy Black / Charles Yeager

Player statistics
Player	Team	Stat	Tot	Player	Team	Stat	Tot
John House	Burlington	BA	.308	Frank Green	Burlington	W	28
John House	Burlington	Hits	158	Fred Steel	Oscaloosa	Pct	.817; 9-2
John House	Burlington	Runs	91				

=== 1912 ===
1912 Iowa State League
schedule

Team Standings	W	L	PCT	GB	Managers
Mason City Cementmakers	38	27	.585	-	Frank Barber
Fort Dodge Boosters	34	25	.576	1	Connie Collins
Estherville	28	22	.560	2½	Harry Welch
Emmetsburg	24	38	.387	12½	Ed Smithson
Clear Lake Fish Eaters	11	24	.314	NA	Dick Wells / M. Bacon

Clear Lake folded July 14
Playoffs: Estherville 4 games, Fort Dodge 1.
