= Estherville (baseball) =

- 1912; Estherville, Iowa

Minor league affiliations
- Class: Independent (1912)
- League: Iowa State League (1912)

Major league affiliations
- Team: None

Minor league titles
- League titles (1): 1912
- Conference titles (1): 1912

Team data
- Name: Estherville (1912)
- Ballpark: Riverside Park (1912)

The Estherville team was a minor league baseball team based in Estherville, Iowa. In 1912, the Estherville team played the season as members of the Independent level Iowa State League, winning the league championship. Estherville was without a formal nickname, common in the era, Estherville hosted home minor league games at Riverside Park.

== History ==
Estherville, Iowa first hosted a minor league baseball team in 1912 and captured a championship in their only season of play. The Estherville team became a member of the 1912 Independent level Iowa State League, which was reformed as a five–team league. Other members joining Estherville in the 1912 Iowa State League were Clear Lake Fish Eaters, Emmetsburg (baseball), Fort Dodge Boosters and Mason City Cementmakers.

In their first season of play Estherville finished in third place in the overall league standings. Estherville ended the 1912 season with a 28–22 record in the overall Iowa State League final standings, playing the season under manager Harry Welch. The Iowa State League played a split–season schedule, with the winners of each half meeting in a playoff. Estherville won the second–half title after the Fort Dodge Boosters won the first–half. During the season, the Clear Lake Fish Eaters team folded on July 12, with an 11–24 record, leaving the league with four teams. In the overall final regular season standings, Estherville finished 2.5 games behind the first place Mason City Cementmakers (38–27), followed by the Fort Dodge Boosters (34–25) and ahead of Emmetsburg (24–38). In the 1912 Iowa State League Finals, Estherville defeated the Fort Dodge Boosters 4 games to 1 in the Finals to capture the championship.

The Iowa State League permanently folded after the 1912 season. Estherville has not hosted another minor league team.

== The ballpark ==
Estherville hosted 1912 minor league home games at Riverside Park. Riverside Park is still in use as a public park, located along the banks of the Des Moines River. Riverside Park is located on the 100 block of East 1st Street in Estherville, Iowa.

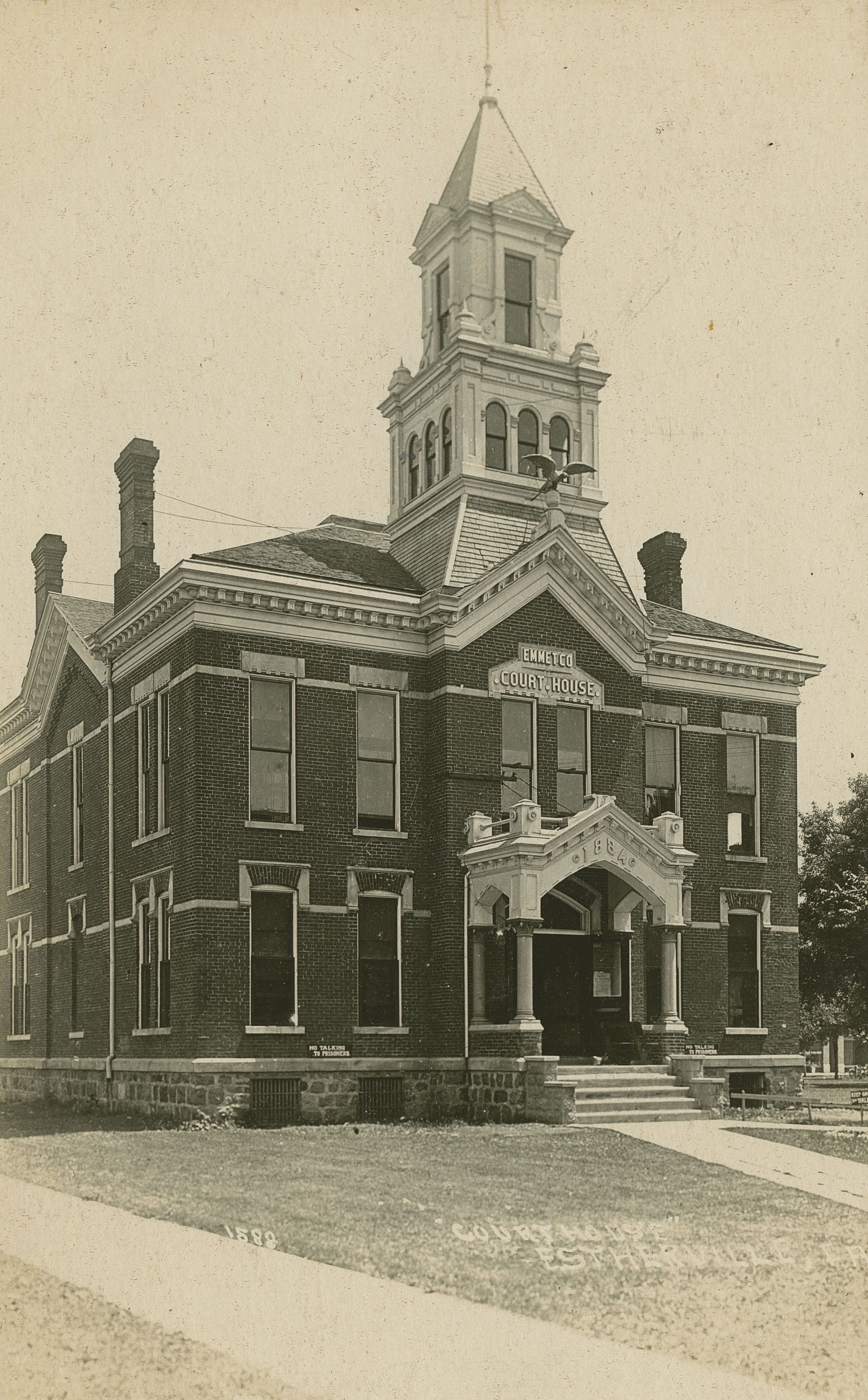
(1935) Emmet County Courthouse. Estherville, Iowa.

== Year–by–year record ==
Year	Record	Finish	Manager	Playoffs/Notes
1912	28–22	3rd	Harry Welch	League champions

== Notable alumni ==
- Exact roster information for the 1912 Estherville team is unknown.
