= Central Association =

- Formerly: Iowa State League
- Classification: Class C (1908–1917); Class D (1947–1949)
- Sport: Minor League Baseball
- First season: 1908
- Folded: 1949
- President: M. E. Justice (1908–1916); John F. Ford (1917); Frank Hern (1947–1948); Lee A. Thomas (1949)
- No. of teams: 30
- Country: United States of America
- Most titles: 3 Ottumwa Speedboys (1911–1913)
- Related competitions: Iowa State League; Illinois–Indiana–Iowa League

The Central Association was an American minor league baseball league. The Central Association began play in 1908, evolving from the 1907 Iowa State League. The Central Association played continuously through 1917 before folding. The league reformed in 1947, operating as a Class C level league from 1947 to 1949, with major league affiliates for most teams.

Baseball Hall of Fame members Grover Cleveland Alexander (Galesburg), Jake Beckley (Hannibal), Burleigh Grimes (Ottumwa) and Sam Rice (Galesburg and Muscatine) are league alumni.

== History ==
=== 1908 to 1917 Central Association ===
The Central Association formed in 1908 with charter members: Burlington Pathfinders (Burlington, Iowa), Jacksonville Lunatics (Jacksonville, Illinois), Keokuk Indians (Keokuk, Iowa), Oskaloosa Quakers (Oskaloosa, Iowa), Ottumwa Packers (Ottumwa, Iowa), Quincy Gems (Quincy, Illinois) and the Waterloo Lulus (Waterloo, Iowa). All had been members of the 1907 Iowa State League the previous season. A new team in Kewanee, Illinois, the Kewanee Boilermakers, joined as the eighth team.

In 1909, the Oskaloosa Quakers franchise folded and the Hannibal Cannibals (Hannibal, Missouri) moved from the Illinois–Missouri League. In 1910, Jacksonville moved to the Northern Association and Waterloo moved to the Illinois–Indiana–Iowa League. The Galesburg Pavers (Galesburg, Illinois) and Monmouth Browns (Monmouth, Illinois) joined after having left the Illinois–Missouri League. For the 1911 season, Quincy moved to the Illinois–Indiana–Iowa League and the Muscatine Camels (Muscatine, Iowa) formed and joined the league.

For 1913, Galesburg and Hannibal folded, with the Cedar Rapids Rabbits (Cedar Rapids, Iowa), and Waterloo Jays (Waterloo, Iowa) forming to join the league. In 1914, Kewanee and Monmouth folded while the Clinton Pilots (Clinton, Iowa) and Marshalltown Ansons (Marshalltown, Iowa) formed and joined the league. Ottumwa moved to Rock Island, Illinois, as the Rock Island Islanders and then again to Galesburg, as the Galesburg Pavers.

In 1915, Galesburg folded and the Mason City Claydiggers (Mason City, Iowa) formed and joined the league. The Clinton team folded during the season. The league also threw out several wins by Keokuk (1), Marshalltown (5), Waterloo (1), and Clinton (40) after the fact.

Keokuk folded in 1916, while the Clinton Pilots rejoined and the Fort Dodge Dodgers (Fort Dodge, Iowa) formed and joined the league. Burlington moved to become the Ottumwa Packers on July 20, and Muscatine also forfeited 34 wins in 1916.

In the final season, 1917, Muscatine and Ottumwa folded. The Dubuque Dubs in Dubuque, Iowa and the La Crosse Infants (La Crosse, Wisconsin) formed and joined the league. Dubuque moved to Charles City, Iowa on July 4 to become the Charles City Tractorites. Cedar Rapids moved to Clear Lake, Iowa on July 27, finishing the season as the Clear Lake Rabbits. Clinton and La Crosse both folded before the end of the season on July 17. After the season, the league, and all teams in it, folded.

=== 1947 to 1949 Central Association ===
In 1947, a new league of the same name was created with major league affiliations. The Clinton Cubs (Chicago Cubs) in Clinton, Iowa; Hannibal Pilots (St. Louis Browns), Hannibal, Missouri; Rockford Rox (Cincinnati Reds), Rockford, Illinois; Keokuk Pirates (Pittsburgh Pirates), Keokuk, Iowa; Burlington Indians (Cleveland Indians), Burlington, Iowa, and the Moline A's, (Philadelphia A's) Moline, Illinois were the charter members of the reformed league.

In 1948, the Moline A's moved to Kewanee, Illinois to become the Kewanee A's in mid-season. In 1949, the Hannibal Pilots folded and the Cedar Rapids Rockets of Cedar Rapids, Iowa formed to join the league. Kewanee captured the 1949 championship. After the 1949 season, Cedar Rapids joined the Illinois–Indiana–Iowa League, and the rest of the teams, and the league itself, folded.

== Cities represented ==
- Burlington, Iowa: Burlington Pathfinders (1908–1916); Burlington Indians (1947–1949)
- Cedar Rapids, Iowa: Cedar Rapids Rabbits (1913–1917); Cedar Rapids Rockets (1949)
- Charles City, Iowa: Charles City Tractorites (1917)
- Clear Lake, Iowa: Clear Lake Rabbits (1917)
- Clinton, Iowa: Clinton Pilots (1914–1917); Clinton Cubs (1947–1948); Clinton Steers (1949)
- Dubuque, Iowa: Dubuque Dubs (1917)
- Fort Dodge, Iowa: Fort Dodge Dodgers (1916–1917)
- Galesburg, Illinois: Galesburg Pavers (1910–1912); Galesburg Pavers (1914)
- Hannibal, Missouri: Hannibal Cannibals (1909–1912); Hannibal Pilots (1947–1948)
- Jacksonville, Illinois: Jacksonville Lunatics (1908); Jacksonville Braves (1909)
- Keokuk, Iowa: Keokuk Indians (1908–1915); Keokuk Pirates (1947–1949)
- Kewanee, Illinois: Kewanee Boilermakers (1908–1913); Kewanee A's (1948–1949)
- LaCrosse, Wisconsin: La Crosse Infants (1917)
- Marshalltown, Iowa: Marshalltown Ansons (1914–1917)
- Mason City, Iowa: Mason City Claydiggers (1915–1917)
- Moline, Illinois: Moline A's (1947–1948)
- Monmouth, Illinois: Monmouth Browns (1910–1913)
- Muscatine, Iowa: Muscatine Camels (1911); Muscatine Wallopers (1912–1913); Muscatine Buttonmakers (1914); Muscatine Muskies (1915–1916)
- Oskaloosa, Iowa: Oskaloosa Quakers (1908)
- Ottumwa, Iowa: Ottumwa Packers (1908–1910); Ottumwa Speedboys (1911–1912); Ottumwa Packers (1913–1914); Ottumwa Packers (1916)
- Rockford, Illinois: Rockford Rox (1947–1949)
- Quincy, Illinois: Quincy Gems (1908); Quincy Vets (1909–1910)
- Rock Island, Illinois: Rock Island Islanders (1914)
- Waterloo, Iowa: Waterloo Lulus (1908–1909); Waterloo Jays (1913–1915); Waterloo Shamrocks (1916); Waterloo Loons (1917)

== Standings & statistics ==
=== 1908 to 1917 ===
1908 Central Association

Team standings	W	L	PCT	GB	Managers
Waterloo Lulus	88	37	.704	–	Frank Boyle
Burlington Pathfinders	83	41	.669	4½	Ned Egan
Quincy Gems	73	55	.570	16½	Harry Hofer
Keokuk Indians	57	68	.456	31	Frank Belt
Jacksonville Lunatics	56	69	.448	32	Harry Berte
Oskaloosa Quakers	51	75	.398	37½	Snapper Kennedy / Taylor Kensel
Kewanee Boilermakers	48	79	.378	41	Harry Busse / Andy Steveson / William Connors
Ottumwa Packers	48	80	.375	41½	Billy Earle / Chuck Fleming

Player statistics
Player	Team	Stat	Tot	Player	Team	Stat	Tot
John House	Burlington	BA	.306	Harry Gaspar	Waterloo	W	32
Charles Rose	Burlington	Hits	146	Harry Gaspar	Waterloo	SO	2.17
Al Linderbeck	Quincy	Runs	75	Harry Gaspar	Waterloo	Pct	.889; 32–4
Al Linderbeck	Quincy	HR	10				

1909 Central Association

Team standings	W	L	PCT	GB	Attend	Managers
Burlington Pathfinders	83	51	.620	–	36,884	Ned Egan
Hannibal Cannibals	83	53	.610	1	30,130	Bert Hough / Ben Prout
Keokuk Indians	80	57	.584	4½	42,029	Frank Belt
Kewanee Boilermakers	73	61	.544	10	31,228	William Connors
Waterloo Lulus	64	69	.481	18½	33,756	Frank Boyle
Quincy Vets	62	73	.459	21½	45,527	Louis Cook / Harry Hofer / Fred Bennett
Jacksonville Braves	46	84	.354	35	26,908	Harry Berte
Ottumwa Packers	48	91	.345	37½	35,576	Hugh Shannon / Arthur Owens

Player statistics
Player	Team	Stat	Tot	Player	Team	Stat	Tot
Fred Fenney	Ottum/Burl	BA	.300	Collis Spencer	Burlington	W	27
George Manush	Burlington	Hits	149	Joe Vyskocil	Hannibal	SO	209
George Manush	Burlington	Runs	91	Burleigh Grimes	Ottum/Kew	Pct	.742; 23–8
Al Linderbeck	Quincy	HR	10				
H.W. Gray	Jacksonville	HR	10				

1910 Central Association
schedule

Team standings	W	L	PCT	GB	Attend	Managers
Quincy Vets	88	50	.638	–	37,213	Bade Myers
Ottumwa Packers	80	57	.584	7½	37,000	Ned Egan
Hannibal Cannibals	77	60	.562	10½	28,547	Bill Prout / Bill Forney
Galesburg Pavers	69	67	.507	18	35,031	Bert Hough
Keokuk Indians	67	70	.493	20½	28,160	Frank Belt
Monmouth Browns	62	72	.459	24	25,000	Lew Drill
Burlington Pathfinders	56	81	.409	31½	25,043	Phil Geier
Kewanee Boilermakers	49	91	.350	40	26,307	William Connors / Ted Price

Player statistics
Player	Team	Stat	Tot	Player	Team	Stat	Tot
Dan Kerwin	Hannibal	BA	.331	Charles Fanning	Galesburg	W	30
Thomas Owens	Quincy	Hits	148	Charles Fanning	Galesburg	SO	320
Don Senno	Ottumwa	Runs	84	Charles Fanning	Galesburg	Pct	.714; 30–12
Thomas Owens	Quincy	HR	9	Bill Donahue	Quincy	HR	9

1911 Central Association
schedule

Team standings	W	L	PCT	GB	Managers
Ottumwa Speedboys	87	41	.680	–	Ned Egan
Burlington Pathfinders	81	44	.648	4½	Richard Rohn
Galesburg Pavers	66	63	.512	21½	Bert Hough
Keokuk Indians	64	64	.500	23	Frank Belt
Kewanee Boilermakers	59	67	.468	27	Jay Andrews
Monmouth Browns	59	69	.461	28	Claude Starke
Muscatine Camels	48	80	.375	39	Harry C. Blake / Lou Walters; Pearl Holycross
Hannibal Cannibals	45	81	.357	41	Jake Beckley

Player statistics
Player	Team	Stat	Tot	Player	Team	Stat	Tot
Pearl Holycross	Muscatine	BA	.361	Ray Boyd	Ottumwa	W	30
Taylor Kensel	Ottumwa	Hits	163	Ray Boyd	Ottumwa	Pct	.811; 30–7
George Watson	Burlington	Runs	108	A.J. Ahring	Muscatine	SB	79
Don Senno	Ottumwa	HR	14				

1912 Central Association

Team standings	W	L	PCT	GB	Attend	Managers
Ottumwa Speedboys	79	50	.612	–	23,000	Ned Egan
Kewanee Boilermakers	74	51	.592	3	19,000	George Pennington / Art Queisser
Burlington Pathfinders	73	53	.579	4½	25,000	Richard Rohn
Monmouth Browns	71	55	.563	6½	18,000	Bert Hough / Jack Corbett; R.L. Noven
Hannibal Cannibals	67	61	.523	11½	NA	Eddie Herr / Ed Painter
Galesburg Pavers	61	67	.477	17½	18,000	Ducky Eberts
Keokuk Indians	49	76	.392	28	17,000	Art Queisser / Bill Proutt
Muscatine Wallopers	33	94	.260	45	22,000	Ed Coleman / Bill Kreig / Joe Wall / Bill Clayton

Player statistics
Player	Team	Stat	Tot	Player	Team	Stat	Tot
George Manush	Ottumwa	BA	.375	Bert Dunn	Ottumwa	W	26
Harry Shanley	Muscatine	Hits	176	Joe Sloan	Keokuk	SO	197
Harry Ellis	Burlington	Runs	100	Tom Drohan	Kewanee	Pct	.800; 24–6
John Sullivan	Ottumwa	HR	21				

1913 Central Association

Team standings	W	L	PCT	GB	Managers
Ottumwa Packers	72	54	.571	–	Ned Egan
Muscatine Wallopers	68	54	.557	2	Frank Boyle
Monmouth Browns	64	62	.508	8	Bert Hough
Keokuk Indians	62	63	.496	9½	George Manush
Burlington Pathfinders	63	66	.488	10½	Richard Rohn
Cedar Rapids Rabbits	59	65	.476	12	Belden Hill
Kewanee Boilermakers	59	65	.476	12	George Pennington / Frank Richardson
Waterloo Jays	53	71	.427	18	Jay Andrews

Player statistics
Player	Team	Stat	Tot	Player	Team	Stat	Tot
Dave Milligan	Cedar Rapids	BA	.320	George Zackert	Muscatine	W	22
Harry Ellis	Burlington	Hits	156	George Zackert	Muscatine	SO	230
Harry Ellis	Burlington	Runs	100	George Zackert	Muscatine	Pct	.759; 22–7
Elmer Jacobs	Burlington	SO	230				

1914 Central Association

Team standings	W	L	PCT	GB	Managers
Waterloo Jays	78	51	.605	–	Jay Andrews
Burlington Pathfinders	75	53	.586	2½	Tom Hayden / George Manush
Muscatine Buttonmakers	72	53	.576	4	Frank Boyle
Clinton Pilots	67	61	.523	10½	Bert Hough
Cedar Rapids Bunnies	64	60	.516	11½	Belden Hill
Keokuk Indians	52	76	.406	25½	Spencer Abbott / Harry Sweet
Marshalltown Ansons	52	76	.406	25½	Frank Richardson
Ottumwa Packers / Rock Island Islanders / Galesburg Pavers	49	79	.373	28½	Ned Egan

Ottumwa moved to Rock Island July 17. The National Association did not allow the Central Association to place a franchise in the territory of the Three-I League, so Rock Island was moved to Galesburg July 24.

Player statistics
Player	Team	Stat	Tot	Player	Team	Stat	Tot
Paddy Siglin	Waterloo	BA	.322	Fred Miller	Burlington	W	23
John Singleton	Burlington	Hits	158	George Zackert	Muscatine	SO	305
Walt Meinert	Burlington	Runs	94	W. Halper	Cedar Rapids	Pct	.722; 13–5

1915 Central Association

Team standings	W	L	PCT	GB	Managers
Burlington Pathfinders	81	38	.681	–	Richard Rohn
Muscatine Muskies	63	57	.525	18½	Ned Egan / Jess Runser
Keokuk Indians	51	52	.495	22	Frank Boyle
Mason City Claydiggers	58	63	.479	24	Harry Bay
Cedar Rapids Rabbits	54	62	.466	25½	James Hamilton / Jack Herbert
Marshalltown Ansons	46	67	.407	32	Frank Richardson / Bob Lynch
Waterloo Jays	52	74	.413	32½	Jay Andrews / Eddie Brennan
Clinton Pilots	13	69	.159	NA	George Manush

Clinton disbanded in mid-season.
Wins taken away: Clinton 40, Keokuk 18, Marshalltown 5, Waterloo 1.

Player statistics
Player	Team	Stat	Tot	Player	Team	Stat	Tot
Bill Collins	Cedar Rapids	BA	.337	Grover Baichley	Burlington	W	23
Walt Meinert	Burlington	Hits	137	Dick Blunk	Burlington	W	23
Walt Meinert	Burlington	Runs	97	Grover Baichley	Burlington	Pct	.697; 23–10
Harmon Hagmon	Burlington	Hits	137	Grover Baichley	Burlington	SO	310
Cliff Lee	Muscatine	HR	9				
Lyle Sours	Muscatine	HR	9				

1916 Central Association

Team standings	W	L	PCT	GB	Managers
Marshalltown Ansons	77	50	.606	–	Frank Boyle
Clinton Pilots	73	51	.589	2½	Jim Drohan / Larry Brown
Cedar Rapids Rabbits	62	64	.492	14½	Jack Herbert / Billy Collins
Burlington Pathfinders / Ottumwa Packers	62	64	.492	14½	Richard Rohn / George Boelzle
Waterloo Shamrocks	58	67	.464	18	Eddie Brennan
Mason City Claydiggers	50	76	.397	26½	Harry Bay
Fort Dodge Dodgers	41	86	.323	36	Paul Turgeon / Babe Towne
Muscatine Muskies	45	44	.506	NA	Ned Egan

Burlington moved to Ottumwa July 20.
Muscatine forfeited 34 wins.

Player statistics
Player	Team	Stat	Tot	Player	Team	Stat	Tot
Babe Ellison	Muscatine	BA	.361	Dick Blunk	Ottumwa	W	24
Babe Ellison	Muscatine	Hits	178	H. W. Flanagan	Muscatine	SO	266
Charles Reinhart	Muscatine	Runs	104	Ken Penner	Marshalltown	ERA	1.41
Albert Durham	Musca/Marsh	HR	18				

1917 Central Association

Team standings	W	L	PCT	GB	Managers
Marshalltown Ansons	64	34	.653	–	Frank Boyle
Mason City Claydiggers	54	38	.587	7	Dan O'Leary
Waterloo Loons	50	42	.543	11	Ned Egan
Cedar Rapids Rabbits / Clear Lake Rabbits	39	52	.429	21½	W. Collins / Jay Andrews / Harry Shanley
Dubuque Dubs / Charles City Tractorites	40	54	.426	22	George Hughes
Fort Dodge Dodgers	37	57	.394	25	Charley Stis
Clinton Pilots	40	33	.548	NA	Larry Brown
La Crosse Infants	29	43	.403	NA	Mike Malloy / Jay Andrews

Dubuque moved to Charles City July 4; Clinton & La Crosse disbanded July 17; Cedar Rapids moved to Clear Lake July 27.
Season ended August 7 with National Association permission.

Player statistics
Player	Team	Stat	Tot	Player	Team	Stat	Tot
Bing Miller	Clinton	BA	.337	Red Torkelson	Marshalltown	W	20
Bing Miller	Clinton	Hits	106	Frank Ulch	La Cros/Cedar	ERA	1.25
Joe Wilkes	Clin/Charl	Runs	69				
John Mokan	Ft. Dodge	HR	9				

=== 1947 to 1949 ===
1947 Central Association
schedule

Team standings	W	L	PCT	GB	Attend	Managers
Clinton Cubs	73	51	.589	–	59,553	Robert Peterson
Hannibal Pilots	69	56	.552	4½	40,490	Herb Nordquist
Rockford Rox	68	57	.544	5½	67,938	Cyril Pfeifer
Keokuk Pirates	61	64	.488	12½	44,332	Frank Oceak
Burlington Indians	52	72	.419	21	37,138	Paul O'Dea
Moline A's	51	74	.408	22.5	27,479	Elwood Wheaton

Playoffs: Clinton 3 games, Rockford 2; Hannibal 3 games, Keokuk 1.
Finals: Clinton 4 games, Hannibal 1.

Player statistics
Player	Team	Stat	Tot	Player	Team	Stat	Tot
Edward Wiltsee	Clinton	BA	.387	Charles Funk	Hannibal	W	19
Roy Sievers	Hannibal	Hits	159	Charles Funk	Hannibal	SO	145
Roy Sievers	Hannibal	Runs	121	Stan Wnetrzak	Clinton	ERA	1.72
Roy Sievers	Hannibal	RBI	141	Roy Sievers	Hannibal	HR	34

1948 Central Association
schedule

Team Standings	W	L	PCT	GB	Attend	Managers
Clinton Cubs	79	47	.627	–	53,133	Nelson Burbrink / Lee Eilbracht
Burlington Indians	68	62	.523	13	70,359	Paul O'Dea / Ski Melillo / Bruno Haas
Hannibal Pilots	67	62	.519	13½	41,124	Walter DeFreitas
Keokuk Pirates	61	67	.477	19	54,694	Phil Seghi
Rockford Rox	56	72	.438	24	43,133	Cyril Pfeifer / Paul O'Dea
Moline A's / Kewanee A's	53	74	.417	26½	38,088	Joe Glenn

Moline (17–25) moved to Kewanee June 18.
Playoffs: Clinton 4 games, Burlington 2; Keokuk 4 games, Hannibal 1.
Finals: Clinton 4 games, Keokuk 0.

Player Statistics
Player	Team	Stat	Tot	Player	Team	Stat	Tot
Gus Bell	Keokuk	BA	.319	Ronald McLeland	Hannibal	W	18
Billy Klaus	Clintonl	Hits	167	Calvin Howe	Clinton	W	18
Elzer Marx	Clinton	Runs	108	Wesley Carr	Clinton	SO	163
Dwight Maxhimer	Clinton	RBI	105	Merrill Merkle	Hannibal	SO	163
John Tanner	Keokuk	HR	23	Ronald McLeland	Hannibal	ERA	2.39

1949 Central Association
schedule

Team Standings	W	L	PCT	GB	Attend	Managers
Burlington Indians	81	48	.628	–	57,915	Lloyd Brown
Keokuk Pirates	74	54	.578	6½	38,931	Charlie Hargreaves
Kewanee A's	68	60	.531	12½	29,482	Harold Hoffman
Cedar Rapids Rockets	63	67	.485	18½	84,185	Packy Rogers
Clinton Steers	61	65	.484	18½	35,764	Adolph Matulis / Joe Blake
Rockford Rox	38	91	.295	43	19,304	Robert Dill / Fred Lietz

Playoffs: Cedar Rapids 3 games, Burlington 0; Kewanee 3 games, Keokuk 0.
Finals: Kewanee 4 games, Cedar Rapids 2.

Player Statistics
Player	Team	Stat	Tot	Player	Team	Stat	Tot
Harry Minor	Keokuk	BA	.350	Walter Rush	Burlington	W	16
John Miller	Kewanee	Hits	158	John Graney	Clinton	SO	164
George Sopko	Keokuk	Runs	120	Harry Pritz	Keokuk	ERA	1.32
John Tanner	Cedar Rapids	RBI	121				
John Tanner	Cedar Rapids	HR	37				

Playoffs: Cedar Rapids beat Burlington 3 games to 0; Kewanee beat Keokuk 3 games to 0.
Finals: Kewanee defeated Cedar Rapids 4 games to 2.
