= Boone, Iowa minor league baseball history =

Boone, Iowa minor league baseball teams
- 1904–1906; Boone, Iowa

Minor league affiliations
- Class: Class D (1904–1906)
- League: Iowa State League (1904–1906)

Major league affiliations
- Team: None

Minor league titles
- League titles (0): None

Team data
- Name: Boone Coal Miners (1904); Boone Greyhounds (1905); Boone Miners (1906)
- Ballpark: Unknown (1904–1906)

Minor league baseball teams were based in Boone, Iowa from 1904 to 1906. Boone teams played exclusively as members of the Class D level Iowa State League, changing the team's nickname in each of their three seasons of minor league play.

== History ==
Minor league baseball play in Boone, Iowa began in 1904. The Boone Coal Miners began minor league baseball play as charter members of the eight–team Class D level Iowa State League. The league was formally known as the "Iowa League of Professional Baseball Clubs." The Burlington River Rats, Fort Dodge Gypsum Eaters, Keokuk Indians, Marshalltown Grays, Oskaloosa Quakers, Ottumwa Snappers and Waterloo Microbes teams joined Boone as charter league members.

The Boone use of the "Coal Miners" moniker corresponds to local industry in the era. Numerous coal mines were located in the region from the 1870's through the 1950s.

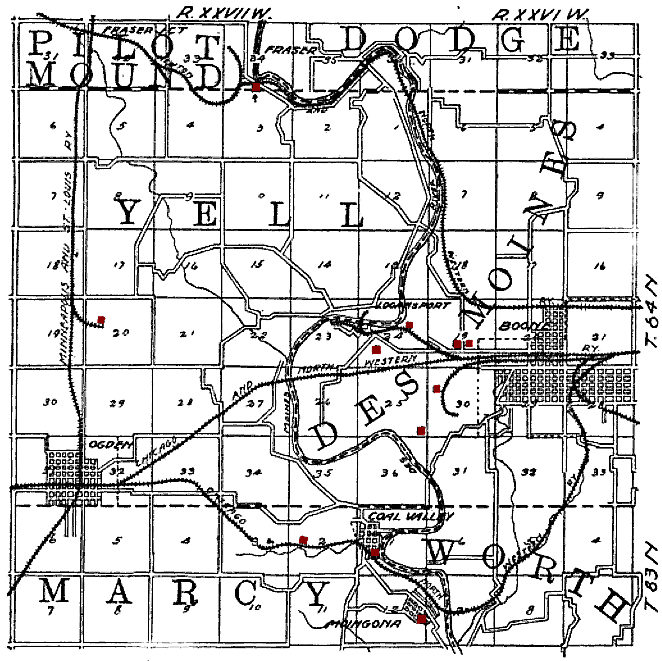
(1909) Boone County mine locations.

In their first season of play, the 1904 Boone Coal Miners finished in sixth place in the Iowa State League final standings. Compiling a record of 50–61, Boone was managed by Thomas Reynolds, Walter Holcomb and O.P. DePew. The Coal Miners finished 22.5 games behind the first place Ottumwa Snappers, as the league held no playoffs.

The complete 1904 Iowa State League inaugural standings were led by the Ottumwa Snappers (70–36), followed by the Waterloo Microbes (64–43), Marshalltown Grays (60–49) Keokuk Indians (58–50), Ft. Dodge Gypsum Eaters (57–52), Boone Coal Miners (50–61), Oskaloosa Quakers (38–69) and Burlington River Rats (36–73).

Continuing play in the 1905 Iowa State League, the Boone Greyhounds placed third in the Iowa State League final standings. The Greyhounds finished with a 65–54 to place third, playing the season under manager Frank Haller. Boone ended the season 9.0 games behind the first place Ottumwa Snappers in the eight–team league. Pitcher Harry Corns of Boone led the Iowa State League with 25 wins

Boone played their final minor league season in 1906, relocating during the season. The Boone Miners relocated to Clinton, Iowa on July 12, 1906, finishing the season as the Clinton Miners. Boone had a record of 25–33 at the time the franchise relocated. After compiling a 21–37 record while based in Clinton, the team finished with an overall record of 46–70 to place sixth. Managed by William Wooley, Pat Ryan and Harold Johnson, the Boone/Clinton team finished 34.0 games behind the first place Burlington Pathfinders in the final standings. Clinton did not return to play in the 1907 Iowa State League and were replaced by the Quincy Gems.

Boone, Iowa has not hosted another minor league team.

== Ballpark ==
The name of the Boone home minor league ballpark is not directly referenced.

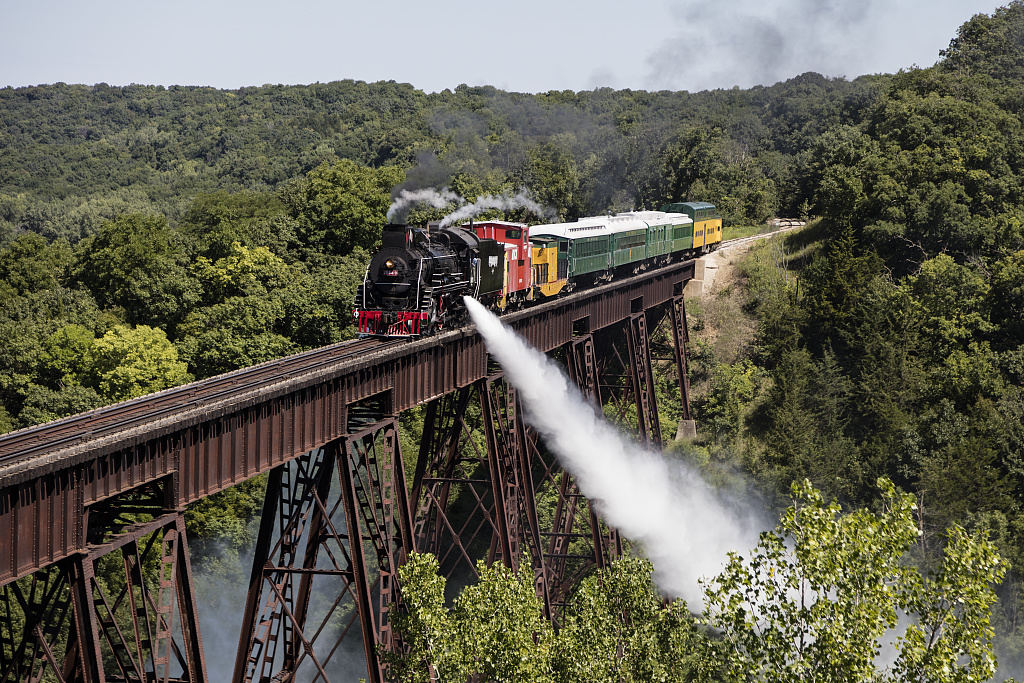
(2016) Steam train, Bass Point Creek Bridge. Boone, Iowa

== Timeline ==
Year(s)	# Yrs.	Team	Level	League
1904	1	Boone Coal Miners	Class D	Iowa State League
1905	1	Boone Greyhounds	Class D	Iowa State League
1906	1	Boone Miners	Class D	Iowa State League

== Year–by–year records ==
Year	Record	Finish	Manager	Playoffs
1904	50–61	6th	Thomas Reynolds / Walter Holcomb / O.P. DePew	No playoffs held
1905	65–54	3rd	Frank Haller	No playoffs held
1906	46–70	6th	William Wooley / Pat Ryan / Harold Johnson	Team (25–33) moved to Clinton July 14

== Notable alumni ==
- Jimmy Archer (1904) Canadian Baseball Hall of Fame
- Red Fisher (1905)
- Rube Geyer (1905)
- Ivan Howard (1905)
- Ollie Johns (1904)

== See also ==
- Boone Coal Miners players
- Boone Greyhounds players
