= Fort Dodge, Iowa minor league baseball history =

Fort Dodge, Iowa minor league baseball teams
- 1904–1917; (1904–1906, 1912, 1916–1917); Fort Dodge, Iowa

Minor league affiliations
- Class: Class D (1904–1906); Independent (1912); Class D (1916–1917)
- League: Iowa State League (1904–1906, 1912); Central Association (1915–1917)

Major league affiliations
- Team: None

Minor league titles
- League titles (0): None
- Wild card berths (1): 1912

Team data
- Name: Fort Dodge Gypsum Eaters (1904); Fort Dodge Gypsumites (1905–1906); Fort Dodge Boosters (1912); Fort Dodge Dodgers (1916–1917)
- Ballpark: Riverside Park (1912, 1916–1917)

Minor league baseball teams were based in Fort Dodge, Iowa, playing various seasons between 1904 and 1917. Fort Dodge teams played as members of the Class D level Iowa State League from 1904 to 1906 and in 1912, before joining the Central Association from 1916 to 1917. Fort Dodge hosted home minor league games at Riverside Park.

Today, the Fort Dodge "Dodgers" nickname is used by Fort Dodge Senior High School.

== History ==
Fort Dodge was home to numerous semi–pro baseball teams prior to the minor league teams beginning play. The Fort Dodge Fort Brands played in the 1903 season against area teams. A Fort Dodge team called "Company G" played indoor baseball in 1904.

=== Iowa State League 1904–1906, 1912 ===
Minor league baseball play began in Fort Dodge in 1904, when the Fort Dodge Gypsum Eaters became charter members of the eight–team Iowa State League. The gypsum references in the Fort Dodge team monikers refer to the strong gypsum industry in Fort Dodge.

In their first season of play, the Gypsum Eaters ended the 1904 season with a record of 57–52, placing fifth in the Iowa State League, playing the season under manager Frank Boyle, who would manage the team for three seasons. The 1904 Iowa State League Final standings included the champion Ottumwa Snappers 70–36, Waterloo Microbes 64–43, Marshalltown Grays 60–49, Keokuk Indians 58–50, Fort Dodge Gypsum Eaters 57–52,Boone Coal Miners 50–61, Oskaloosa Quakers 38–69 and Burlington River Rats 36–73. Home season attendance for Fort Dodge was 13,582, an average of 249 per game.

The franchise was renamed to the Fort Dodge Gypsumites for the 1905 the Iowa State League season. The team held a naming contest prior to the 1905 season. Over thirty names were submitted, and it was noted that "Gypsumites" was "appropriate and unique" to Fort Dodge, due to the local industry. The name was submitted by L.A. Thorson. The Fort Dodge Gypsumites finished their 1905 season with a record of 73–49, finishing in second place in the regular season standings, 2.5 games behind the champion Ottumwa Snappers. Frank Boyle again served as manager. Season attendance was 19,270, an average of 316 per home game.

The 1906 Fort Dodge Gypsumites placed third in the Iowa State League final standings. The Gypsumites finished with a 68–49 record, 6.5 games behind the first place Burlington Pathfinders, playing under manager Frank Boyle. The Fort Dodge franchise folded from the Iowa State League following the 1906 season.

In 1912, the Fort Dodge Boosters returned the city to minor league play as franchise became members the Independent level five–team Iowa State League. The Boosters ended the 1912 season with a record of 34–25, placing second in the Iowa State League, 1.0 game behind the first place Mason City Cementmakers. Conrad Collins was the 1912 manager. In the playoffs, the Estherville, Iowa team defeated the Fort Dodge Boosters 4 games to 1. The Iowa State League folded after the 1912 season.

=== Central Association 1916–1917 ===
The Fort Dodge Dodgers became members of the 1916 Class D level Central Association, as the Iowa State League changed names. The Fort Dodge Dodgers finished the 1916 season with a 41–83 record, placing seventh in the Central Association standings. Fort Dodge finished seventh place because the eighth place Muscatine Muskies were forced to forfeit 34 wins, dropping the Muscatine team into last place. Paul Turgeon and Babe Towne were the 1916 managers, as Fort Dodge finished 36.0 games behind the first place Marshalltown Ansons.

The 1917 Fort Dodge Dodgers placed sixth in their final season of play. On July 8, 1917, Fort Dodge pitcher Ted Turner pitched a losing no–hitter against the Charles City Tractories as Fort Dodge lost the game 1–0. Fort Dodge ended the 1917 Central Association season with a record of 37–57 record under manager Charley Stis. Fort Dodge was last in the standings as the Clinton Pilots and La Crosse Infants folded during the season. The Dodgers were 25.0 games behind the first place Marshalltown Ansons in the final standings. The Central Association season ended early on August 7, 1917. The league then folded following the 1917 season.

Fort Dodge has not hosted another minor league team.

Today, the Fort Dodge "Dodgers" moniker is still in use by the Fort Dodge Senior High School athletic teams.

In 2018, a reassembled team called the "Fort Dodge Gypsum Eaters" paid homage to the 1904 Fort Dodge team. The team played an exhibition game at the Field of Dreams, near Dyersville, Iowa. Fort Dodge played against a travelling team from the United Kingdom and Ireland Baseball Federation.

In 2019, Fort Dodge gained a collegiate summer baseball franchise, who adopted a close moniker to early Fort Dodge minor league teams. The Fort Dodge Gypsum Miners began play in the Pioneer Collegiate Baseball League, with home games played at Patterson Field and coached by Connor McLeod.

== The ballpark ==
The Fort Dodge minor league teams are noted to have played home games at Riverside Park. Post card pictures from the era indicate the ballpark was located in a residential area along the river next to a bridge and articles mention "Riverside Park" as the baseball park. Today, Riverside Park in Fort Dodge is a public park located at the Kenyon Road bridge & Avenue B, along the banks of the Des Moines River in Fort Dodge, Iowa.

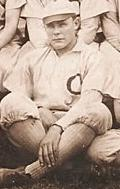
Babe Towne, Fort Dodge manager.

== Timeline ==
Year(s)	# Yrs.	Team	Level	League	Ballpark
1904	1	Fort Dodge Gypsum Eaters	Class D	Iowa State League	Riverside Park
1905–1906	2	Fort Dodge Gypsumites	Class D	Iowa State League	Riverside Park
1912	1	Fort Dodge Boosters	Independent	Iowa State League	Riverside Park
1916–1917	2	Fort Dodge Dodgers	Class D	Central Association	Riverside Park

== Year–by–year records ==
Year	Record	Finish	Manager	Playoffs
1904	57–52	5th	Frank Boyle	No playoffs held
1905	73–49	2nd	Frank Boyle	No playoffs held
1906	68–49	3rd	Frank Boyle	No playoffs held
1912	34–25	2nd	Conrad Collins	Lost in Finals
1916	41–83	7th	Paul Turgeon / Babe Towne	No playoffs held
1917	37–57	6th	Charley Stis	No playoffs held

== Notable alumni ==
- Lee Dashner (1916)
- Bill Davidson (1905–1906)
- John Eubank (1904–1905)
- Red Fisher (1906)
- Shags Horan (1916)
- Earl Howard (1916)
- Joe Kostal (1906)
- Johnny Mokan (1917)
- Roy Sanders (1916)
- Charley Stis (1917, MGR)
- George Tomer (1917)
- Babe Towne (1916, MGR)
- Joe Zalusky (1904)

== See also ==
- Fort Dodge Dodgers players
- Fort Dodge Gypsum Eaters players
- Fort Dodge Gypsumites players

no
