= Mason City Claydiggers =

- 1912–1917; (1912, 1915–1917); Mason City, Iowa

Minor league affiliations
- Class: Independent (1912); Class D (1915–1917)
- League: Iowa State League (1912); Central Association (1915–1917)

Major league affiliations
- Team: None

Minor league titles
- League titles (0): None
- Conference titles (1): 1912

Team data
- Name: Mason City Cementmakers (1912); Mason City Claydiggers (1915–1917)
- Ballpark: Hanford Park (1912, 1915–1917)

The Mason City Claydiggers were a minor league baseball team based in Mason City, Iowa. The "Claydiggers" played as members of the Class D level Central Association from 1915 to 1917. In 1912, Mason City "Cementmakers" played their first minor league season as a member of the independent Iowa State League and won the league pennant.

The Mason City teams hosted minor league home games at Hanford Park.

== History ==
Beginning in 1902, Mason City hosted numerous semi–pro teams in the years before minor league baseball, playing as the "Hubs" and "Claydiggers."

Minor league baseball began in Mason City with the 1912 Mason City Cementmakers, who joined the Independent level Iowa State League.

The Mason City Cementmakers won the 1912 Iowa State League pennant. Mason City finished with a record of 38–27, placing first overall in the five–team Iowa State League final standings under manager Frank Barber. Mason City finished ahead of the Fort Dodge Boosters (34–25), Estherville, Iowa (28–22), Emmetsburg (24–38) and Clear Lake Fish Eaters (11–24) in the overall standings. However, Mason City did not play in the playoffs as the league played a split season schedule and Mason City did not win either of the half seasons. The Iowa State League permanently folded after the 1912 season.

In 1915, Mason City returned to minor league play. The Mason City Claydiggers began play as members of the Class D level Central Association, replacing the Galesburg Pavers franchise in the league. Mason City hosted the league opener at Mason City on May 6, 1915, where the Claydiggers were defeated 2–0 by the Muscatine Muskies. In attendance for the opener were Iowa Governor George W. Clark, Adjutant General Guy E. Logan and Central Association President M. E.Justice. Mason City Mayor Truman Potter threw out the first pitch.

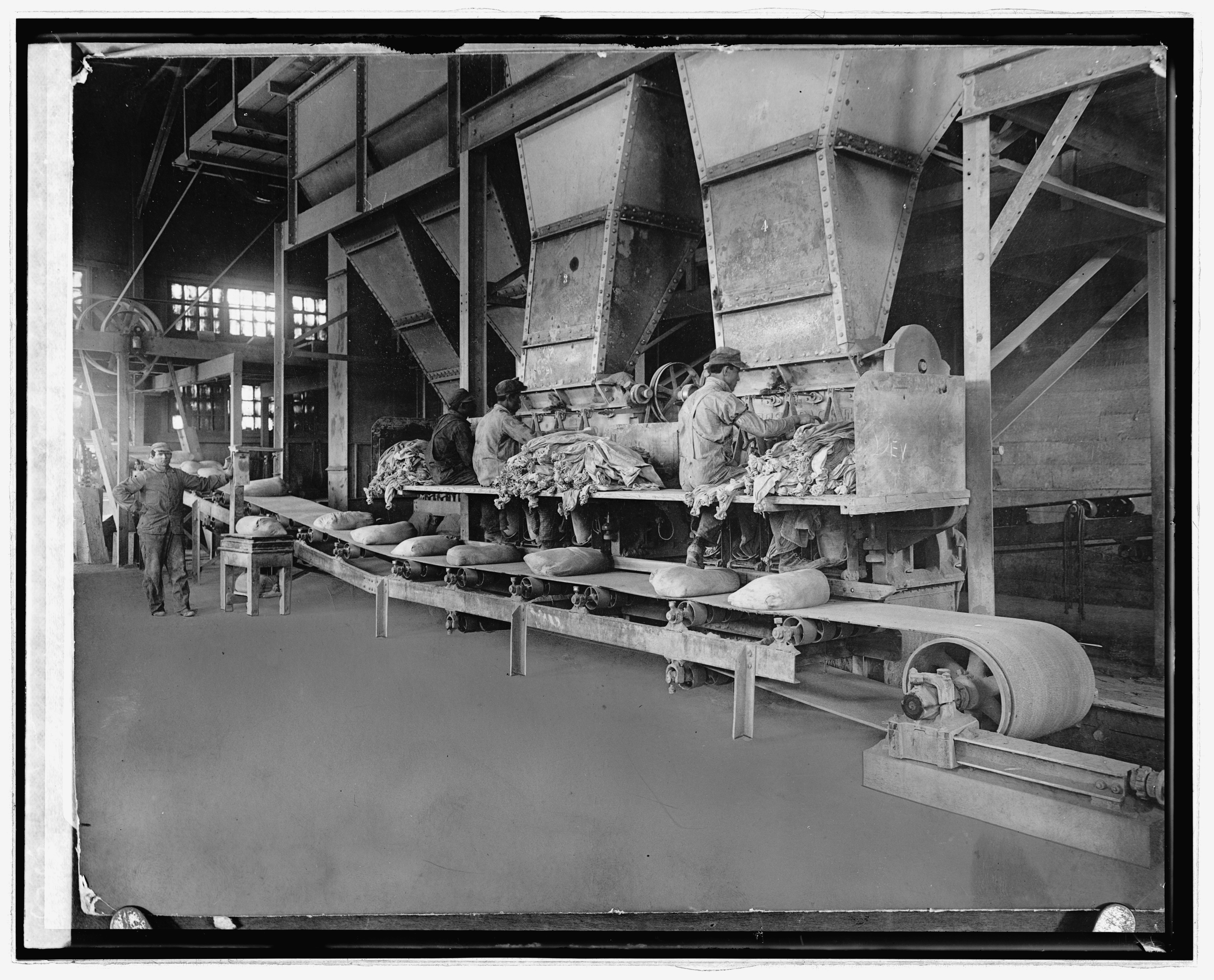
(1910) Sacking machines, Portland Cement Co. Mason City, Iowa

In their first season of play in the Central Association, the Mason City Claydiggers ended with a record of 58–63, finishing in fourth place in the regular season standings, playing the season under manager Harry Bay. The 1915 league standings were led by the first place Burlington Pathfinders (81–38), followed by the Muscatine Muskies (63–57), Keokuk Indians (51–52), Mason City Claydiggers (58–63), Cedar Rapids Rabbits (54–62), Marshalltown Ansons (46–67), Waterloo Jays (52–74) and Clinton Pilots (13–69). Mason City finished 24.0 games behind the first place Burlington team.

The Mason City Claydiggers finished in sixth place in the eight–team Central Association in 1916. Mason City had a record of 50–73 under returning manager Harry Bay, finishing 26.5 games behind the first place Marshalltown Ansons.

The 1917 season was the final one for the early Central Association. The league folded after the 1917 season and reformed in 1947. The 1917 Claydiggers finished with a 54–38 record, placing second in the Central Association, playing the season under manager Dan O'Leary. Mason City finished 7.0 games behind the first place Marshalltown Ansons. The league received permission and ceased play on August 7, 1917. The league did not return to play in 1918.

Mason City was without minor league baseball until 1994. The Mason City Bats played as members of the Independent level four–team Great Central League. The Bats finished with a record of 19–41, placing fourth in the standings in the league's only season of play.

== The ballpark ==
Mason City teams played home minor league games at Hanford Park. After the Claydiggers folded, the grandstands were disassembled, and the lumber was used for projects at the local fairgrounds. Hanford Park was located at the southwest corner of Pierce Avenue & Highway 106 in Mason City.

== Timeline ==
Year(s)	# Yrs.	Team	Level	League	Ballpark
1912	1	Mason City Cementmakers	Independent	Iowa State League	Hanford Park
1915–1917	3	Mason City Claydiggers	Class D	Central Association	Hanford Park

== Year–by–year records ==
Year	Record	Finish	Manager	Playoffs/Notes
1912	38–27	1st	Frank Barber	Did not qualify
1915	58–63	4th	Harry Bay	No playoffs held
1916	50–73	6th	Harry Bay	No playoffs held
1917	54–38	2nd	Dan O'Leary	No playoffs held

== Notable alumni ==
- Harry Bay (1915–1916, MGR)
- Eddie Brown (1915–1917)
- Bill Burwell (1917)
- Clarence Garrett (1915–1916)
- Harry Lunte (1916)

== See also ==
- Mason City Claydiggers players
