= Maury Kent =

American baseball and football coach (1885-1966)

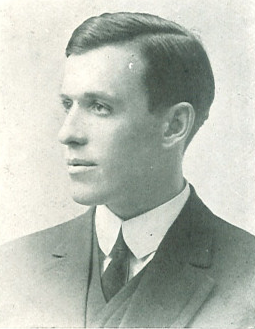
- Kent from 1916 Hawkeye

Biographical details
- Born: September 17, 1885; Marshalltown, Iowa, U.S.
- Died: April 19, 1966 (aged 80); Iowa City, Iowa, U.S.

Playing career

Football
- 1904–1907: Iowa

Baseball
- 1907: Marshalltown Snappers
- 1908: Oskaloosa Quakers
- 1909: Waterloo Lulus
- 1910: Ottumwa Packers
- 1911: Birmingham Barons
- 1912–1913: Brooklyn Dodgers
- 1912–1913: Toronto Maple Leafs
- 1914: Memphis Chickasaws
- Position: Pitcher (baseball)

Coaching career (HC unless noted)

Football
- 1909–1912: Carleton
- c. 1915: Iowa (assistant)
- 1921: Iowa State
- c. 1926: Northwestern (assistant)
- c. 1944: Iowa (assistant)

Basketball
- 1909–1913: Carleton
- 1913–1918: Iowa
- 1920–1921: Iowa State
- 1922–1927: Northwestern

Baseball
- 1908: Iowa
- c. 1910: Carleton
- 1914–1918: Iowa
- 1919–1920: Wisconsin
- 1921–1922: Iowa State
- 1923–1928: Northwestern
- 1942–1943: Northwestern

Head coaching record
- Overall: 24–7–2 (football); 96–122 (basketball); 112–145–3 (baseball)

Baseball career
- Pitcher
- Batted: Right Threw: Right

MLB debut
- April 15, 1912, for the Brooklyn Dodgers

Last MLB appearance
- July 18, 1913, for the Brooklyn Dodgers

MLB statistics
- Win–loss record: 5–5
- Earned run average: 4.66
- Strikeouts: 25
- Stats at Baseball Reference

Teams
- Brooklyn Trolley Dodgers/Dodgers (1912–1913)

Maurice Allen Kent (September 17, 1885 – April 19, 1966) was a collegiate head coach in three different sports. He coached baseball at Iowa, Wisconsin, Iowa State and Northwestern between 1908 and 1943. Kent was the head basketball coach at Iowa, Iowa State, and Northwestern between 1913 and 1927. And he coached football at Carleton College and Iowa State.

Kent graduated from the University of Iowa in 1908. He pitched for the Brooklyn Dodgers during the 1912 and 1913 baseball seasons.

== Head coaching record ==
=== Football ===
Year	Team	Overall	Conference	Standing	Bowl/playoffs
Carleton (Independent) (1909–1912)
1909	Carleton	4–1–1			
1910	Carleton	6–0			
1911	Carleton	6–1			
1912	Carleton	4–1–1			
Carleton:		20–3–2			
Iowa State Cyclones (Missouri Valley Intercollegiate Athletic Association) (1921)
1921	Iowa State	4–4	3–4	6th	
Iowa State:		4–4	3–4		
Total:		24–7–2			
