= Tom Hess =

Tom Hess may refer to:

- Tom Hess (baseball)
- Tom Hess (bowler)

== See also ==
- Thomas B. Hess, American art editor and curator
