= Emmetsburg (baseball) =

Emmmetsburg (baseball)
- 1912; Emmetsburg, Iowa

Minor league affiliations
- Class: Independent (1912)
- League: Iowa State League (1912)

Major league affiliations
- Team: None

Minor league titles
- League titles (0): None

Team data
- Name: Emmetsburg (1912)
- Ballpark: Harrison Park (1912)

The Emmetsburg team was a minor league baseball team based in Emmetsburg, Iowa. In 1912, the Emmetsburg team was without a formal nickname, common in the era and played the season as members of the Independent level Iowa State League, placing fourth in their only season of minor league play. Emmetsburg hosted minor league home games at Harrison Park.

== History ==
Emmetsburg, Iowa gained a minor league baseball team in 1912, when the "Emmetsburg" team became a charter member of the 1912 Iowa State League, which had reformed as a five–team Independent level league. Other members joining Emmetsburg in the 1912 Iowa State League were Clear Lake Fish Eaters, Estherville, Iowa. Fort Dodge Boosters and Mason City Cementmakers teams.

Beginning play on May 23, 1912, with home games at Harrison Park, Emmetsburg finished the 1912 season with a 24–38 record, placing fourth in the Iowa State League final standings, playing the season under manager Ed Smithson. The Clear Lake Fish Eaters team folded on July 12, with an 11–24 record, before the completion of the regular season, leaving the league with four teams.

In the overall final regular season standings, Emmetsburg finished 12.5 games behind the first place Mason City Cementmakers (38–27) and followed the Fort Dodge Boosters (34–25) and Estherville (28–22). The Iowa State League played a split season schedule, with the winners of each half meeting in a playoff. Estherville defeated Fort Dodge in the Finals to capture the championship. The Iowa State League folded permanently after the 1912 season.

Emmetsburg has not hosted another minor league team.

== The ballpark ==
Emmetsburg played home games at Harrison Park. Harrison Park is still in use today and is located at Main Street & Call Street in Emmetsburg, Iowa.

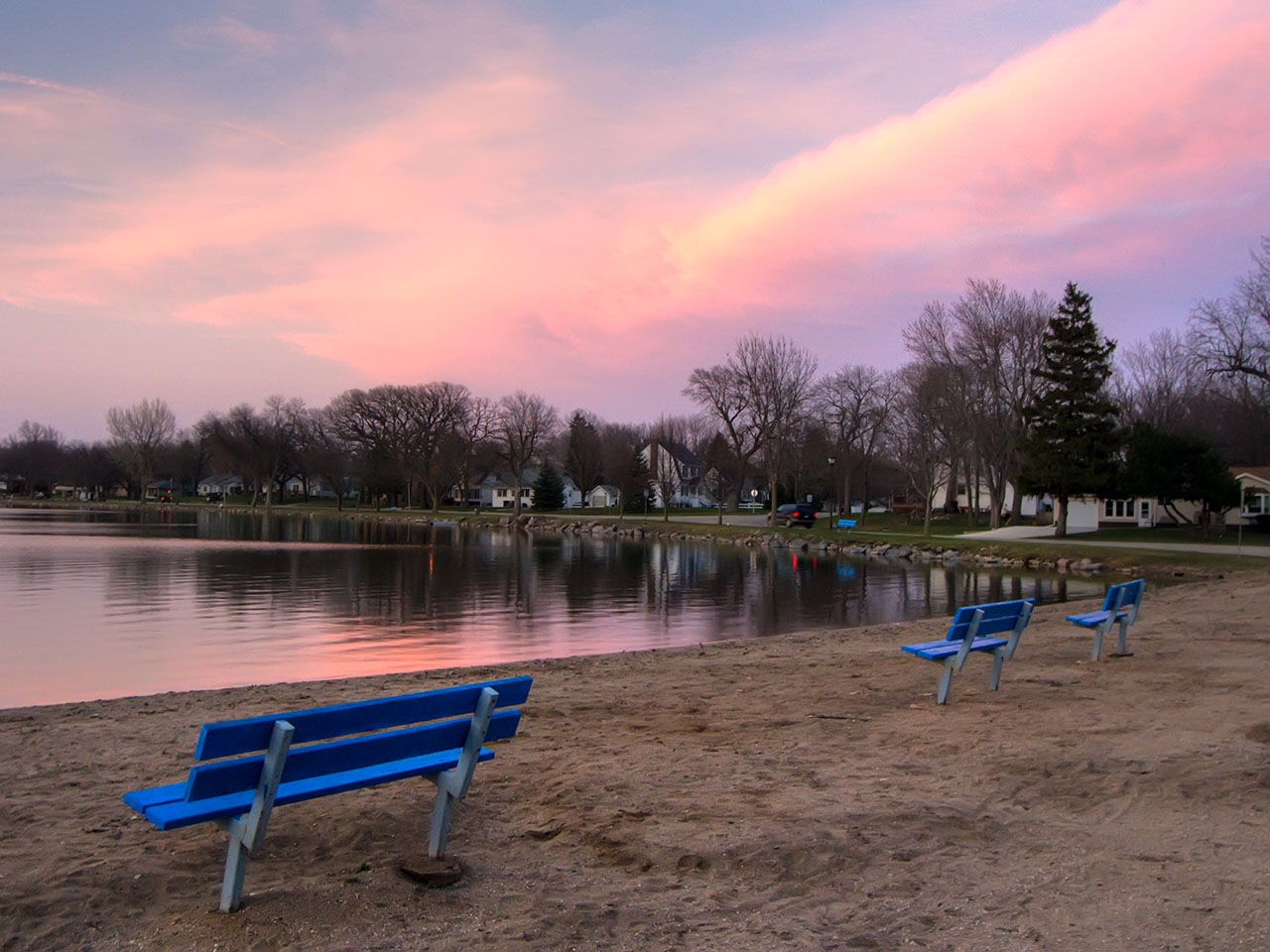
(2008) Five Island Lake at sunset. Emmetsburg, Iowa.

== Year–by–year record ==
Year	Record	Finish	Manager	Playoffs/notes
1912	24–38	4th	Ed Smithson	Did not qualify

== Notable alumni ==
- Exact roster information for the 1912 Emmetsburg team is unknown.
