= Paddy Siglin =

American baseball player (1891–1956)

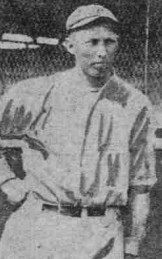
- Second baseman
- Born: September 24, 1891; Aurelia, Iowa, U.S.
- Died: August 5, 1956 (aged 64); Oakland, California, U.S.
- Batted: Right Threw: Right

MLB debut
- September 12, 1914, for the Pittsburgh Pirates

Last MLB appearance
- September 30, 1916, for the Pittsburgh Pirates

MLB statistics
- Games played: 23
- Batting average: .180
- Runs batted in: 2
- Stats at Baseball Reference

Teams
- Pittsburgh Pirates (1914–1916)

Wesley Peter "Paddy" Siglin (September 24, 1891 – August 5, 1956) was an American second baseman in Major League Baseball. He played parts of three seasons for the Pittsburgh Pirates and also spent 14 seasons in various minor leagues. Siglin was 5 feet 10 inches (1.78 m) tall and weighed 160 pounds (73 kg).

== Career ==
Siglin was born in Aurelia, Iowa, in 1891. He started his professional baseball career in 1913 with the Central Association's Waterloo Jays. After batting .227 during his first season, Siglin was hitting .320 in July 1914 when he was purchased by the Pittsburgh Pirates. He made his major league debut on September 12 of that year.

Siglin appeared in 23 MLB games from 1914 to 1916, and he went 9 for 56 (.180) at the plate. In 1917, he moved west to join the Pacific Coast League's Oakland Oaks. He spent one season with Oakland, one with the Salt Lake City Bees, and then two with the Portland Beavers, never hitting above .283.

After the 1920 season, the Beavers traded Siglin to the Salt Lake City Bees for Marty Krug. While reporting the trade, The Deseret News noted that, "Due to his personal inclinations to the Salt Lake club, it is very likely that Siglin will play a much better game for Salt Lake than he did for Portland."

Siglin proved the newspaper correct, as he immediately had the best offensive season of his career in 1921. He set career-highs in hits (270), doubles (67), home runs (22), batting average (.344), slugging percentage (.522), and total bases (409), and he led all PCL players in hits, doubles, home runs, and total bases. Siglin had another solid performance in 1922, batting .316 with 16 home runs and leading the league with 60 doubles and a .972 fielding percentage at second base.

Siglin then spent three years with the Sacramento Senators. His batting average went down from .303 in 1923 to .256 in 1925. He played one more season after that before retiring from professional baseball.

Overall, Siglin had 2,264 hits in his 14-year minor league career. In addition to being a good hitter and fielder, he was a leader on the baseball diamond and served as the captain of the Portland Beavers when he played for them. He could also be aggressive when he had to. Former PCL umpire Beans Reardon once said:

I had a fistfight with Paddy Siglin during a game in San Francisco ... The newspaper the next day carried three big pictures of the fight. One of them showed me landing a punch on Paddy's nose. Another one showed him beating on the back of my neck.

Siglin died in Oakland, California, in 1956 and was buried in Santa Clara Mission Cemetery.
