= Harry Gaspar =

American baseball player (1883–1940)

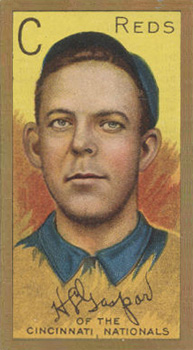
- Pitcher
- Born: April 28, 1883; Kingsley, Iowa, U.S.
- Died: May 14, 1940 (aged 57); Orange, California, U.S.
- Batted: Right Threw: Right

MLB debut
- April 17, 1909, for the Cincinnati Reds

Last MLB appearance
- June 20, 1912, for the Cincinnati Reds

MLB statistics
- Win–loss record: 46–48
- Earned run average: 2.69
- Strikeouts: 228
- Stats at Baseball Reference

Teams
- Cincinnati Reds (1909–1912)

Harry Lambert Gaspar (April 28, 1883 – May 14, 1940) was an American professional baseball player. He was a right-handed pitcher over parts of four seasons (1909–1912) with the Cincinnati Reds. For his career, he compiled a 46–48 record in 143 appearances, with a 2.69 earned run average and 228 strikeouts.

In 1909, pitching for the Waterloo Lulus of the Class D level Central Association, Gaspar helped the Lulus to the championship as he led the Central Association in wins with a 32–4 record and a league leading 2.17 ERA. Gaspar made his major league debut with the Cincinnati Reds in 1909, after his Central Association season.

During his major league career, Gaspar operated a photography business called Gaspar Studio in Le Mars, Iowa. Later, Gaspar later co-owned and managed the Gaspar-Anderson Bowling Alleys in Santa Ana, California, where he died in 1940.

Gaspar was born in Kingsley, Iowa, and later died in Orange, California at the age of 57.

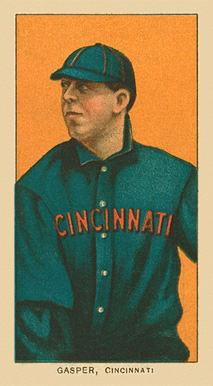
Harry Gaspar, T206 card from the 1909 Cincinnati Reds

== See also ==
- List of Major League Baseball annual saves leaders
