= Red Ormsby =

American baseball umpire (1895-1962)

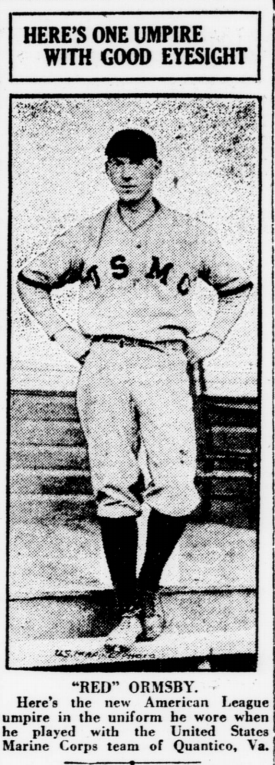
- Ormsby with the Marines
- Born: Emmet Thomas Ormsby; April 3, 1895; Chicago, Illinois, U.S.
- Died: October 11, 1962 (aged 67); Chicago, Illinois, U.S.
- Occupation: Umpire
- Years active: 1923–1941
- Employer: American League

Emmet Thomas "Red" Ormsby (April 3, 1895 – October 11, 1962) was an American professional baseball umpire who worked in the American League from 1923 to 1941. Ormsby umpired 2,537 major league games in his 19-year career, in addition to working in the 1935 Major League Baseball All-Star Game, and in four World Series (1927, 1933, 1937, and 1940).

== Pitching career ==
Ormsby began his baseball career in 1913 as a pitcher in the Wisconsin–Illinois League. He posted a 14–13 win-loss record while playing for the Green Bay Bays. In 1914, he pitched for Green Bay, Waterloo, and Omaha. He then served in the Marines during World War I.

== Umpiring career ==
In 1921, Ormsby started his umpiring career in the Illinois–Indiana–Iowa League. He moved on to the Western League in 1922, before being hired by the American League in 1923. In 1927, he required a police escort from the field in Philadelphia after a foul ball ruling on a blast hit by Ty Cobb. Fans rioted after Cobb and Al Simmons were both ejected from the game. At a 1929 Philadelphia-Cleveland game, Ormsby sustained a concussion when was hit in the head by a glass bottle intended for another umpire.

During a Browns-White Sox contest in 1935, Ormsby was indirectly responsible for the start of Hall of Fame umpire Jocko Conlan's time as an arbiter. Ormsby was overcome by the heat during the game and injured White Sox player Conlan was asked to assume umpiring duties.

In December 1941, Ormsby was placed on the retired list with a pension. He had been in declining health for the last three years of his career.

== Later life ==
After his umpiring career, he worked as a scout for the Chicago White Sox from 1946 to 1949. He also worked with a county sheriff's department and was secretary on the Chicago Liquor License Appeal Board. He died on October 11, 1962, while raking leaves at his Chicago home.

== External Sources ==
- Red Ormsby at SABR Bio Project
