= Tom Drohan =

American baseball player

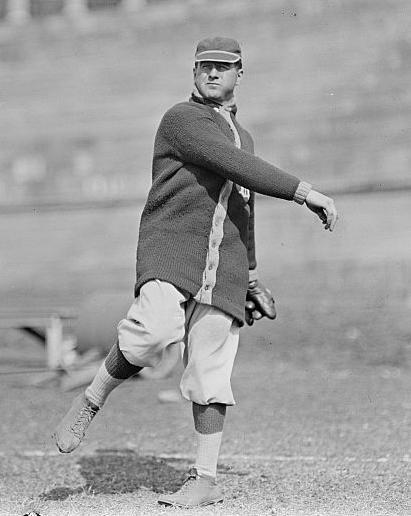
- Pitcher
- Born: August 26, 1887; Fall River, Massachusetts, U.S.
- Died: September 17, 1926 (aged 39); Kewanee, Illinois, U.S.
- Batted: Right Threw: Right

MLB debut
- May 1, 1913, for the Washington Senators

Last MLB appearance
- May 16, 1913, for the Washington Senators

MLB statistics
- Games played: 2
- Innings pitched: 2
- Earned runs: 2
- Stats at Baseball Reference

Teams
- Washington Senators (1913)

Thomas F. Drohan (August 26, 1887 – September 17, 1926) was an American professional baseball pitcher from 1908 to 1917. He played one season in Major League Baseball for the Washington Senators. Drohan was 5 feet, 10 inches tall and weighed 175 pounds.

== Career ==
Drohan was born in Fall River, Massachusetts, in 1887. He started his professional baseball career in 1908. That season, he had a win–loss record of 11–12 in the Central League. In 1911, Drohan joined the Central Association's Kewanee Boilermakers and was the team's top pitcher, with a record of 19–10. The following season, he improved to 24–6. He won 17 of 19 games at one point and was pitching so well that Kewanee received a number of offers from other clubs to buy him. He pitched a no-hitter against Hannibal on August 29, winning 4–0. The following year, Sporting Life wrote that he was a "natural pitcher" and "considered an unusually good prospect."

Drohan was drafted by the American League's Washington Senators in the 1912 rule 5 draft. He appeared in two games for them in May 1913, allowing two earned runs in two innings pitched. Soon afterwards, Washington released him. The Cleveland Naps claimed Drohan off waivers, but he never pitched for Cleveland, and his major league career was over. He then returned to the Central Association in 1914. He spent most of the season with the Waterloo Jays and went 15-7 for Waterloo. The following year, his record dropped to 14–17. Drohan then joined the Clinton Pilots in 1916 and went 9–6 with a 2.34 earned run average. He stayed in the Central Association for one more campaign in 1917 before his professional baseball career ended.

Overall, Drohan pitched in 220 minor league baseball games and had a career win-loss record of 101–76. He died in Kewanee, Illinois – the site of his former glory – in 1926 and was buried in Pleasant View Cemetery.
