= Joe Zalusky =

American athlete and coach (1881–1970)

Biographical details
- Born: March 30, 1881; Minneapolis, Minnesota, U.S.
- Died: November 7, 1970 (aged 89); Minneapolis, Minnesota, U.S.

Playing career

Football
- 1902: Knox (IL)

Baseball
- 1904: Oskaloosa Quakers
- 1904: Fort Dodge Gypsum Eaters
- 1906: Rock Island Islanders
- Position: Halfback

Coaching career (HC unless noted)

Football
- 1904–1910: Penn (IA)

Baseball
- 1906: Penn (IA)

Administrative career (AD unless noted)
- 1904–1906: Penn (IA)

Head coaching record
- Overall: 19–8–5 (football); 0–2 (baseball)

Joseph William Zalusky (March 30, 1881 – November 7, 1970) was an American minor league baseball player and an American football player and coach. He served as the head football coach at Penn College—now known as William Penn University—in Oskaloosa, Iowa from 1904 to 1910, compiling a record of 19–8–5. As a college football player at Knox College in Galesburg, Illinois, he was part of a 1902 squad that beat Northwestern, Kansas, and Notre Dame in three consecutive games.
