= Pioneer Collegiate Baseball League =

- Most recent season or competition: 2019
- Sport: Baseball, Collegiate summer baseball
- Founded: 2017
- No. of teams: 4
- Countries: United States
- Most recent champion: Bancroft Bandits (2019)
- Most titles: Bancroft Bandits, Albert Lea Lakers, Storm Lake Whitecaps (1)

The Pioneer Collegiate Baseball League was a collegiate summer baseball league based in Iowa, comprising teams of the top college players from North America and beyond. Players in the league must have college eligibility remaining, or be graduating seniors in order to participate. Players are not paid, so as to maintain their college eligibility.

== History ==
PCBL formed in the summer of 2017 with five member teams competing. Teams play a 32-game regular season beginning in June followed by a league playoff.

Carroll Merchants finished season one with the best regular season record and swept their way to the championship game eliminating Bancroft Bandits in two games. Second place Storm Lake Whitecaps needed three games in their semifinal series against Sioux Falls Gold to advance then won the first league championship by defeating Carroll 8-5.

Albert Lea pitcher Ben Madison of Central Baptist College (NAIA) became the first PCBL player drafted by a Major League Baseball team when the San Francisco Giants selected him in the 2018 MLB draft.

Expansion came in January 2019 when it was announced a team would be placed in Fort Dodge. The team was later named the Gypsum Miners. The Albert Lea Lakers were disbanded by the league owner two days before the 2019 playoffs and were denied the chance to compete in the playoffs. The Bancroft Bandits would go on to win the 2019 league championship over the Carroll Merchants 7-5 in one 9 inning game. Michael Keeran was the head coach of both the 2018 Lakers and 2019 Bandits championship teams.

== Teams ==
PCBL teams at end of 2019
Team	Location	Stadium	First season
Bancroft Bandits	Bancroft, Iowa	Bancroft Memorial Park	2017
Carroll Merchants	Carroll, Iowa	Merchants Park	2017
Fort Dodge Gypsum Miners	Fort Dodge, Iowa	Patterson Field	2019
Storm Lake Whitecaps	Storm Lake, Iowa	Memorial Field	2017

=== Former teams ===
- Albert Lea Lakers (2017-2019)
- Peak Prospects (2018-2019)
- Sioux Falls Gold (2017)

== Champions ==
PCBL champions
Season	Champion	Runner-up	Result
2017	Storm Lake Whitecaps	Carroll Merchants	8-5
2018	Albert Lea Lakers	Storm Lake Whitecaps	2-0 (best-of three)
2019	Bancroft Bandits	Carroll Merchants	7-5
