= Clear Lake Fish Eaters =

- 1912; (1912, 1917); Clear Lake, Iowa

Minor league affiliations
- Class: Independent (1912); Class D (1917)
- League: Iowa State League (1912); Central Association (1917)

Major league affiliations
- Team: None

Minor league titles
- League titles (0): None

Team data
- Name: Clear Lake Fish Eaters (1912); Clear Lake Rabbits (1917)
- Ballpark: Clear Lake City Ball Park (1912, 1917)

The Clear Lake Fish Eaters were a minor league baseball team based in Clear Lake, Iowa. The Clear Lake Fish Eaters played a partial season as members of the Independent level Iowa State League in 1912, folding before the end of the season.

The 1917 Clear Lake "Rabbits" became members of the Class D level Central Association during the season when the Cedar Rapids Rabbits relocated for the final five games of the season

The Clear Lake teams hosted home minor league games at the Clear Lake City Ball Park. The ballpark site is still in use as a public park.

== History ==
Clear Lake, Iowa first began minor league baseball play in 1912, when the Clear Lake Fish Eaters became members of the 1912 Iowa State League. The league had reformed as a five–team Independent League, playing a split–schedule. The Emmetsburg, Estherville, the Fort Dodge Boosters, and Mason City Cementmakers teams joined Clear Lake in beginning league play on may 23, 1912. The Fish Eaters finished the with a record of 11–24 in the first–half standings, playing under managers Dick Wells and M. Bacon. Clear Lake played two games in the second–half before the franchise folded on July 12, 1914. The Iowa State League folded permanently after the 1914 season.

In 1917, Clear Lake resumed minor league play during the season. The Clear Lake Rabbits became members of the Class D level Central Association. On July 24, 1917, the Central Association member Cedar Rapids Rabbits moved to Clear Lake with a 38–48 record. Based in Clear Lake the team compiled a 1–4 record in finishing the remainder of the season. The Cedar Rapids/Clear Lake team ended the season with an overall record of 39–52. The Rabbits placed fourth in the Central Association standings, playing the season under managers Bill Collins, Doc Andrews and Doc Shanley.

The Central Association folded after the 1917 season. Clear Lake, Iowa has not hosted another minor league team.

== The ballpark ==
Both Clear Lake teams played at Clear Lake City Ball Park. The ballpark was located within the City Park, located on the lakefront and near downtown. City Park is still in use today as a public park. The address of the ballpark was 1st Avenue North & North 3rd Street, Clear Lake, Iowa.

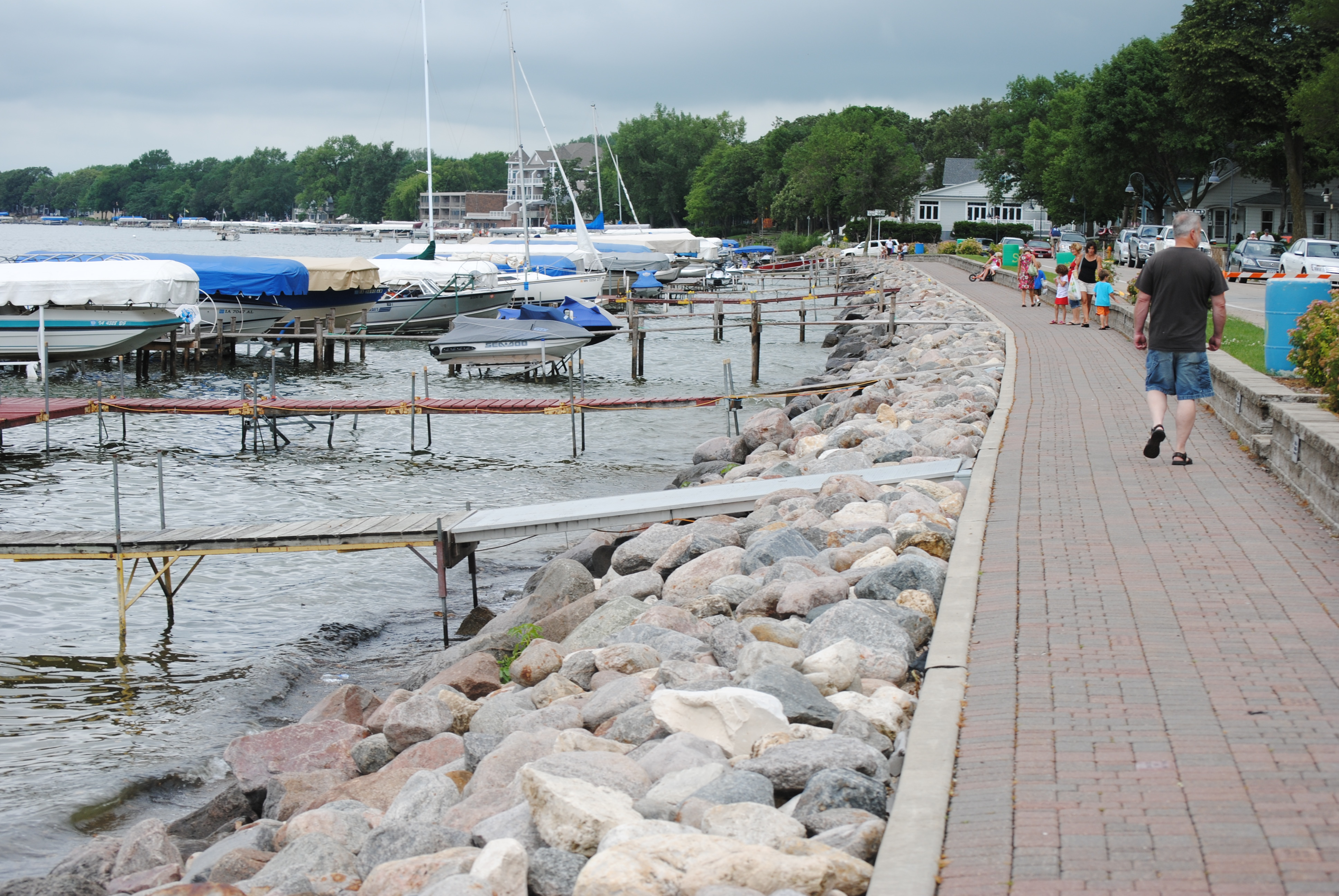
(2010) Clear Lake Waterfront. Clear Lake, Iowa

== Timeline ==
| Year(s) | # Yrs. | Team | Level | League | Ballpark |
|---|---|---|---|---|---|
| 1912 | 1 | Clear Lake Fish Eaters | Independent | Iowa State League | Clear Lake City Ball Park |
| 1917 | 1 | Clear Lake Rabbits | Class D | Central Association | Clear Lake City Ball Park |

== Year-by-year records ==
| Year | Record | Finish | Manager | Notes |
|---|---|---|---|---|
| 1912 | 11–24 | NA | Dick Wells / M. Bacon | Clear Lake disbanded July 14 |
| 1917 | 39–52 | 4th | Warren Collins / Doc Andrews / Harry Shanley | Cedar Rapids (38–48) moved to Clear Lake July 27 |

== Notable alumni ==
- Bill Collins (1917)
- Ray French (1917)
- Walt Meinert (1917)
- Doc Shanley (1917)

== See also ==
- Clear Lake Rabbits players
