= Tom Hess (baseball) =

American baseball player (1875–1945)

- Catcher
- Born: August 15, 1875; Brooklyn, New York, U.S.
- Died: December 15, 1945 (aged 70); Albany, New York, U.S.
- Batted: Unknown Threw: Right

MLB debut
- June 6, 1892, for the Baltimore Orioles

Last MLB appearance
- June 6, 1892, for the Baltimore Orioles

MLB statistics
- Batting average: .000
- Home runs: 0
- Runs batted in: 0
- Stats at Baseball Reference

Teams
- Baltimore Orioles (1892)

Thomas Hess (born Thomas Heslin August 15, 1875 – December 15, 1945) was an American professional baseball catcher who played one season in Major League Baseball. He made his major league debut on June 6, 1892, and it would prove to be his last appearance as well. He would go on to play for multiple minor league teams.

== Professional career ==
=== 1892 season ===
Hess began his professional career with the Baltimore Orioles of the National League in 1892. On June 6, he played his only game at the major league level and didn't obtain a hit in two at-bats. This was his only season in Major League Baseball. On June 14, he was released by the Orioles.

=== 1901–1911 seasons ===
After a nine year absence from professional baseball, Hess joined the non-affiliated Class-C Albany Senators of the New York State League during the 1901 season. In 98 games, he batted .293 with 108 hits in 368 at-bats. The next season, 1902, Hess played 85 games with Albany and batted .230 with 72 hits in 313 at-bats. Hess began playing for the non-affiliated Independent Portland Browns during the Pacific Coast League's's inaugural season in 1903. In 56 games, Hess batted .260 with 54 hits, seven doubles baseball, and one triple in 208 at-bats. In 1904, Hess played for both the Class-D Waterloo Microbes and the Class-A Sioux City Soos. With the Microbes, Hess batted .100 in 16 games. He later played for the Soos where he hit .223 with 21 hits in 25 games. He began to play for the Class-D Oskaloosa Quakers of the Iowa League of Professional Baseball Clubs in 1905. With the Quakers, Hess batted .209 with 43 hits in 61 games. In 1906, Hess returned to Sioux City, Iowa to play for the renamed Sioux City Packers of the Western League where in 78 games he hit .245 with 64 hits in 261 at-bats. In 1907, he began to play for the Class-C Galveston Sand Crabs of the Texas League. In 1908, Hess played for both the Class-D Winston-Salem Twins, and the Class-B Wilkes-Barre Barons. With the Twins, Hess batted .320 with 16 hits in 17 games. After his move to the Barons, he batted .224 with 11 hits in 17 games. The next season, 1909, Hess played for the Class-B Elmira Colonels where he batted .189 with 10 hits in 23 games. He sat out during the 1910 season, and returned to professional play during the 1911 joining the Class-D Hamilton Kolts of the Canadian League where he batted .293 with 29 hits, three doubles, and one triple in 28 games.
