= George Tomer =

American baseball player (1895-1984)

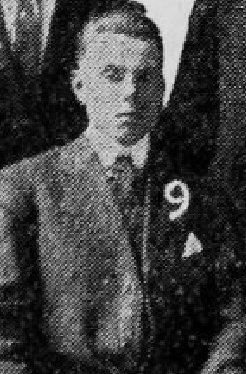
- Pinch hitter
- Born: November 26, 1895; Perry, Iowa, U.S.
- Died: December 15, 1984 (aged 89); Perry, Iowa, U.S.
- Batted: Left Threw: Right

MLB debut
- September 17, 1913, for the St. Louis Browns

Last MLB appearance
- September 17, 1913, for the St. Louis Browns

MLB statistics
- Games: 1
- At bats: 1
- Hits: 0
- Stats at Baseball Reference

Teams
- St. Louis Browns (1913)

George Clarence Tomer (November 26, 1895 – December 15, 1984) was an American Major League Baseball player who pinch hit for the St. Louis Browns in 1913. Tomer had a 13-year Minor League career following his one Major League game. He was also a player-manager for the Kalamazoo Celery Pickers and the Marshalltown Ansons.
