= George Zackert =

American baseball player (1884–1977)

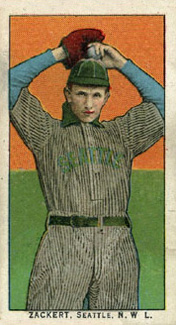
- Pitcher
- Born: December 24, 1884; St. Joseph, Missouri, U.S.
- Died: February 18, 1977 (aged 91); Burlington, Iowa, U.S.
- Batted: Left Threw: Left

MLB debut
- September 22, 1911, for the St. Louis Cardinals

Last MLB appearance
- July 17, 1912, for the St. Louis Cardinals

MLB statistics
- Win–loss record: 0–2
- Earned run average: 11.88
- Strikeouts: 6
- Stats at Baseball Reference

Teams
- St. Louis Cardinals (1911–1912)

George Carl Zackert (December 24, 1884 – February 18, 1977) nicknamed "Zeke", was an American professional baseball pitcher. He played parts of two seasons in Major League Baseball for the St. Louis Cardinals (1911–1912).

During the baseball offseason, Zackert worked as a harnessmaker in St. Joseph, Missouri.
