= Charlie Frisbee =

American baseball player (1874–1954)

- Outfielder
- Born: February 2, 1874; Dows, Iowa, U.S.
- Died: November 7, 1954 (aged 80); Iowa Falls, Iowa, U.S.
- Batted: Switch Threw: Right

MLB debut
- June 22, 1899, for the Boston Beaneaters

Last MLB appearance
- May 13, 1900, for the New York Giants

MLB statistics
- Batting average: .315
- Home runs: 0
- Runs batted in: 23
- Stats at Baseball Reference

Teams
- Boston Beaneaters (1899); New York Giants (1900)

Charles Augustus Frisbee (February 2, 1874 – November 7, 1954) was an American outfielder in Major League Baseball. He played for the Boston Beaneaters and the New York Giants of the National League in 1899 and 1900. He went to college at Grinnell College.
