= Ham Patterson =

American baseball player (1877–1945)

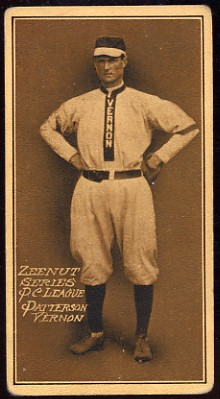
- First baseman / Outfielder
- Born: October 13, 1877; Belleville, Illinois, U.S.
- Died: November 25, 1945 (aged 68); Swansea, Illinois, U.S.
- Batted: Right Threw: Right

MLB debut
- May 18, 1909, for the St. Louis Browns

Last MLB appearance
- August 30, 1909, for the Chicago White Sox

MLB statistics
- Batting average: .192
- Home runs: 0
- Runs batted in: 5
- Stats at Baseball Reference

Teams
- St. Louis Browns (1909); Chicago White Sox (1909)

Hamilton Patterson (October 13, 1877 – November 25, 1945) was an American first baseman and outfielder in Major League Baseball. He played for the St. Louis Browns and Chicago White Sox. His younger brother, Pat Patterson (baseball), born 19 years later, would have a brief career in Major League baseball as well.
