= Jesse Hoffmeister =

American baseball player (1872–1933)

- Third baseman
- Born: June 1872; Toledo, Ohio, U.S.
- Died: January 14, 1933 (aged 60); Des Moines, Iowa, U.S.
- Batted: Unknown Threw: Right

MLB debut
- July 24, 1897, for the Pittsburgh Pirates

Last MLB appearance
- October 2, 1897, for the Pittsburgh Pirates

MLB statistics
- Batting average: .309
- Home runs: 3
- Runs batted in: 36
- Stats at Baseball Reference

Teams
- Pittsburgh Pirates (1897)

Jesse H. Hoffmeister (June 1872 – January 14, 1933) was an American Major League Baseball player who played infield in 1897. He would play for the Pittsburgh Pirates. Hoffmeister had a strong season at the plate but his defense was atrocious with a .792 fielding percentage.

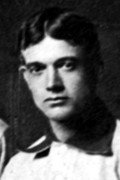
