= La Crosse Blackhawks =

- 1905–1942; (1905-1913, 1917, 1926, 1940-1942); La Crosse, Wisconsin

Minor league affiliations
- Previous classes: Class D (1917, 1926, 1940–1942); Class C (1913); Class D (1912); Class C (1911); Class D (1905–1910)
- Previous leagues: Wisconsin State League (1940–1942); Wisconsin-Illinois League (1926); Central Association (1917); Northern League (1913); Minnesota-Wisconsin League (1909–1912); Wisconsin-Illinois League (1908); Wisconsin State League (1905–1907)

Major league affiliations
- Previous teams: St. Louis Cardinals (1942)

Minor league titles
- League titles: 1940

Team data
- Previous names: La Crosse Blackhawks (1940–1942); La Crosse Boosters (1926); La Crosse Infants (1917); St. Paul Colts/La Crosse Colts (1913); La Crosse Outcats (1909–1912); La Crosse Pinks (1908); La Crosse Badgers (1907); La Crosse Pinks (1905–1906)

The La Crosse Blackhawks was the final moniker of the minor league baseball teams based in La Crosse, Wisconsin. La Crosse teams played under various names between 1905 and 1942. The La Crosse teams played as members of the Wisconsin State League (1940–1942), Wisconsin-Illinois League (1926), Central Association (1917), Northern League (1913), Minnesota-Wisconsin League (1909–1912), Wisconsin-Illinois League (1908) and Wisconsin State League (1905–1907).

The La Crosse Blackhawks were an affiliate of the St. Louis Cardinals in 1942.

Major League Baseball players Jeff Pfeffer, Bill Schardt, Doc Watson and Jack Zalusky played for La Crosse teams.
