= Snapper Kennedy =

American baseball player

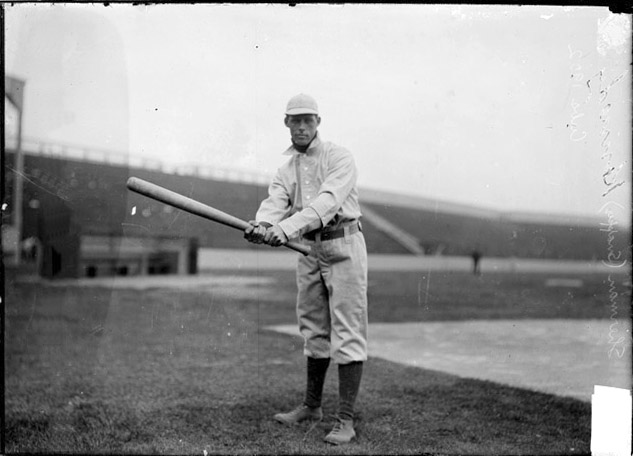
- Outfielder
- Born: November 1, 1878; Conneaut, Ohio, U.S.
- Died: July 31, 1945 (aged 66); Pasadena, Texas, U.S.
- Batted: Both Threw: Right

MLB debut
- May 1, 1902, for the Chicago Orphans

Last MLB appearance
- May 1, 1902, for the Chicago Orphans

MLB statistics
- Batting average: .000
- Home runs: 0
- Runs batted in: 0
- Stats at Baseball Reference

Teams
- Chicago Orphans (1902)

Sherman Montgomery Kennedy (November 1, 1878 – July 31, 1945) was an American professional baseball player. He was an outfielder for one season (1902) with the Chicago Orphans. In his career, he collected no hits in 5 at bats.

He was born in Conneaut, Ohio and died in Pasadena, Texas at the age of 66.
