= Red Fisher (baseball) =

American baseball player (1887-1940)

- Left fielder
- Born: June 22, 1881; At sea, Atlantic Ocean
- Died: January 31, 1940 (aged 58); Louisville, Kentucky, U.S.
- Batted: Both Threw: Right

MLB debut
- April 21, 1910, for the St. Louis Browns

Last MLB appearance
- June 30, 1910, for the St. Louis Browns

MLB statistics
- Batting average: .125
- Home runs: 0
- Runs batted in: 3
- Stats at Baseball Reference

Teams
- St. Louis Browns (1910)

John Gustave "Red" Fisher (June 22, 1881 – January 31, 1940) was an American Major League Baseball left fielder who played in 1910 with the St. Louis Browns.
