= Marshalltown Ansons =

- 1914–1928; (1914–1917, 1922–1928); Marshalltown, Iowa

Minor league affiliations
- Previous classes: Class D (1904–1907, 1914–1917, 1922–1928)
- Previous leagues: Iowa State League (1904–1907); Central Association (1914-1917); Mississippi Valley League (1922–1928)

Major league affiliations
- Previous teams: None

Minor league titles
- League titles: 2 1916, 1917

Team data
- Name: Marshalltown Grays (1904–1905) Marshalltown Brownies (1906); Marshalltown Snappers (1907); Marhsalltown Ansons (1914–1917, 1922–1928)
- Ballpark: Marshall County Fairgrounds (1914–1917, 1922–1928)

The Marshalltown Ansons were a minor league baseball team that played in the Central Association from 1914 to 1917 and in the Mississippi Valley League from 1922 to 1928. They were located in Marshalltown, Iowa.

== History ==
The team was named for Henry Anson and his son, Baseball Hall of Fame inductee Cap Anson (b. 1852). Henry Anson helped lay out the city of Marshalltown in its inception and is recognized as the patriarch of the city. Cap Anson was a legendary baseball figure who was born and raised in Marshalltown. The Ansons were key in the growth of baseball in the city, as Cap, his father Henry and his brother Sturgis Anson all played for the local team, the Marshalltown Stars. At the age of 15, Cap played second base, with Henry Anson at third base, Adrian's brother Sturgis in center field, as the Marshalltown Stars won the Iowa state championship in 1868.

In 1871, the Rockford Forest City club with pitcher, Al Spalding (Spalding Sporting Goods), came to Marshalltown to play the Marshalltown Stars. After the series, all three of the Ansons were offered professional contracts by Rockford and while Henry and Sturgis turned Rockford down, Cap accepted and began his storied professional baseball career.

The Marshalltown Ansons played in the Central Association (1914-1917) after being preceded by the Marshalltown Grays, Brownies and Snappers of the Iowa State League (1904–1907). The Ansons won Central Association Championships in 1916 and 1917 before the league folded after the 1917 season.

The Marshalltown Ansons were founding members of the Mississippi Valley League in 1922, joining the Cedar Rapids Bunnies, Dubuque Climbers, Ottumwa Cardinals, Rock Island Islanders and Waterloo Hawks in the new six-team league. The league added the Moline Plowboys and Burlington Bees in 1924. After finishing 2nd in 1922, with a 73-55 record, the Ansons finished 4th, 6th twice, 7th twice and 8th in their remaining seasons. The Marshalltown Ansons folded after the 1928 season and were replaced by the Davenport Blue Sox in the 1929 Mississippi Valley League.

== The ballpark ==
The Marshalltown Ansons played their home games at the Marshall County Fairgrounds with the ballpark located off of East Main Street in Marshalltown. Today, the fairgrounds are called the Central Iowa Fairgrounds, located at 1308 East Olive Street, Marshalltown, Iowa, 50158.

== Year-by-year records ==
Year	Record	Finish	Manager	Playoffs
1914	52-76	7th	Frank Richardson	No playoffs held
1915	46-67	6th	Frank Richardson / Bob Lynch	No playoffs held
1916	77-50	1st	Frank Boyle	No playoffs held League Champs
1917	64-34	1st	Frank Boyle	No playoffs held League Champs
1922	73-55	2nd	Frank Boyle	No playoffs held
1923	48-78	6th	Frank Boyle	No playoffs held
1924	43-78	8th	Jack Lacy / Frank Boyle	No playoffs held
1925	55-70	7th	Frank Boyle	No playoffs held
1926	41-79	7th	E.F. Lane / Casey Coffin / Dike Brannigan / Dan O'Leary	No playoffs held
1927	65-54	4th	Jim Shollenberger	No playoffs held
1928	58-65	6th	Jim Shollenberger / George Tomer / Ken Diamond	No playoffs held

== Notable alumni ==
- Andy Bednar (1926)
- Como Cotelle (1927)
- Ferd Eunick (1916-1917)
- Frank Gregory (1922)
- Frank Jude (1914)
- Frank Harter (1914)
- Owen Kahn (1927)
- Cliff Lee (1916-1917)
- Buzz Murphy (1915, 1917)
- George Payne (1917)
- Ken Penner (1916)
- Ray Pepper (1927)
- Goldie Rapp (1915)
- Jack Richardson (1914-1915)
- Brad Springer (1925-1926)
- Ray Shook (1914)
- Phil Slattery (1914-1916)
- Ray Starr (1927)
- George Tomer (1927-1928)
- Red Torkelson (1916-1917)
