= Henderson Gamecocks =

- 1929–1931; Henderson, North Carolina

Minor league affiliations
- Class: Class C (1929–1931)
- League: Piedmont League (1929–1931)

Major league affiliations
- Team: None

Minor league titles
- League titles (0): None
- Conference titles (1): 1930

Team data
- Name: Henderson Bunnies (1929); Henderson Gamecocks (1930–1931)
- Ballpark: Lassiter Park (1929–1931)

The Henderson Gamecocks were a minor league baseball team based in Henderson, North Carolina. From 1929 to 1931, Henderson teams played exclusively as members of the Class C level Piedmont League, winning the 1930 pennant. The 1929 team was known as the "Henderson Bunnies," in reference to manager Bunny Hearn. The Bunnies and the Gamecocks hosted minor league home games as Lassiter Park.

== History ==
Henderson, North Carolina first hosted league baseball play in 1929. The Henderson Bunnies became members of the six–team Class C level Piedmont League. The Durham Bulls, Greensboro Patriots, High Point Pointers, Salisbury-Spencer Colonials, and Winston-Salem Twins joined Henderson as 1929 league members. The Henderson franchise replaced the Raleigh Capitals in league play.

Beginning Piedmont League play on April 24, 1929, the Henderson Bunnies placed fifth in the six–team Piedmont League regular season standings. The Bunnies ended the regular season with a record of 54–85, playing under manager and "Bunnies" namesake Bunny Hearn. On May 24, 1929, Hearn was replaced as manager by Lewis Murphy. Other managers during the season were Guy Winston and Lee Gooch. Henderson finished 32.5 games behind the first place Durham Bulls in the final Piedmont League regular season standings. The Bunnies did not qualify for the two–team playoffs won by the Greensboro Patriots.

Continuing in their second season of play, the team became known as the Henderson "Gamecocks" and won the 1930 Piedmont League pennant. The Gamecocks placed first in the six–team Piedmont League regular season standings, ending the regular season with a record of 78–63, playing under manager Jimmy Teague. Henderson finished 9.0 games ahead the second place Durham Bulls in the Piedmont League regular season standings and qualified for the two–team playoff. The Durham Bulls defeated the Henderson 4 games to 3 in the Finals.

In their final season of play, the 1931 Henderson Gamecocks played in the eight–team Class C level Piedmont League, which expanded in 1931 adding the Asheville Tourists and Charlotte Hornets franchises. The Gamecocks ended their final season in seventh place. With a record of 51–82, playing under managers Jimmy Teague and Mack Arnette, the Gamecocks finished 42.5 games behind the first place Charlotte Hornets in the final regular season standings. Henderson did not qualify for the two–team playoff, won by the Charlotte Hornets. The Piedmont League was elevated to a Class B level league following the 1931 season.

The Henderson Gamecocks did not return to play in 1932 and the team was replaced in the 1932 eight-team Piedmont League by the Wilmington Pirates franchise.

Henderson, North Carolina has not hosted another minor league team.

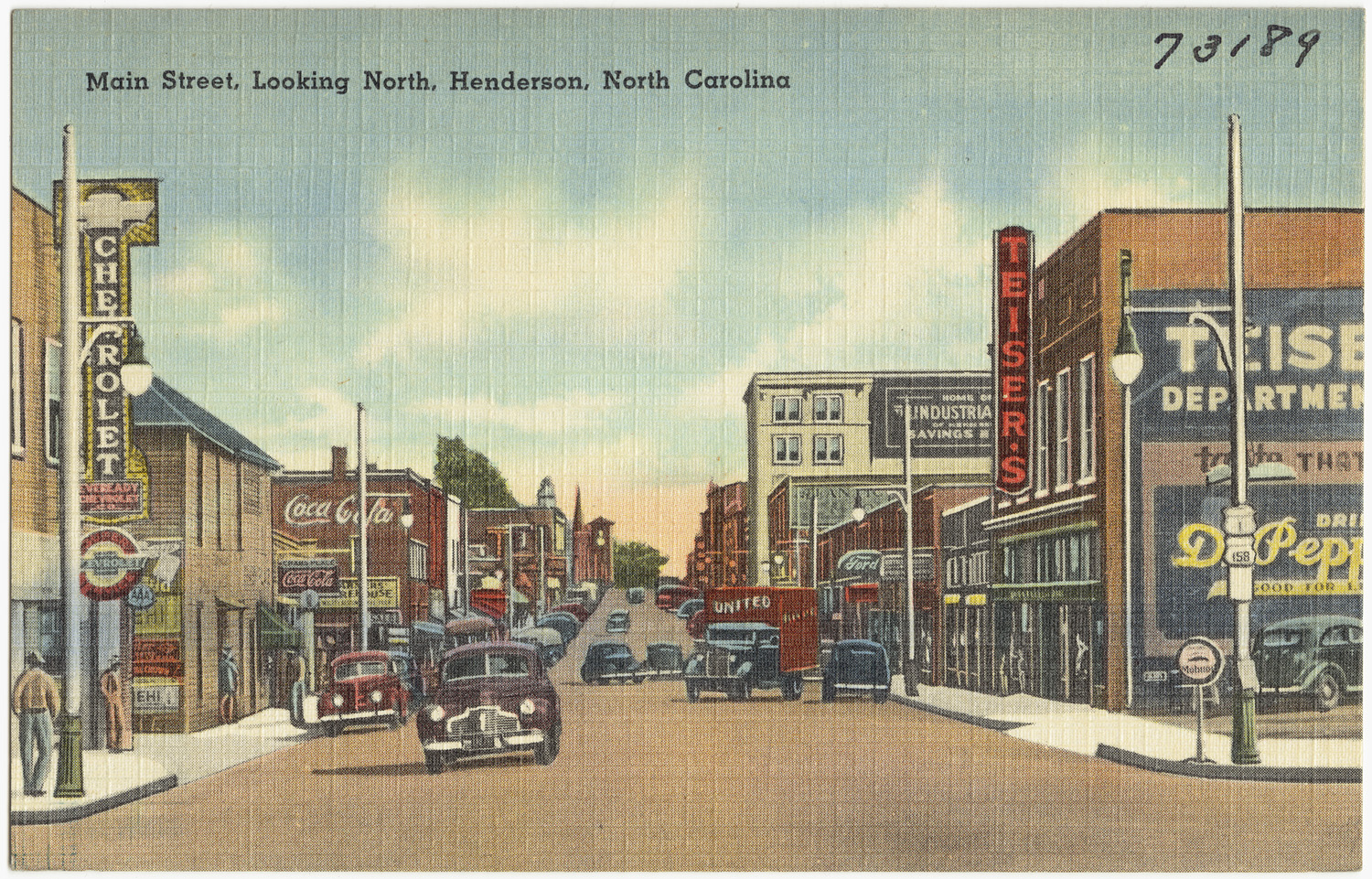
(1930) Main street, looking North. Henderson, North Carolina

== The ballpark ==
The Henderson Bunnies and Gamecocks teams hosted home minor league home games at Lassiter Park. It was reported the ballpark had a capacity of 3,000.

== Timeline ==
Year(s)	# Yrs.	Team	Level	League	Affiliate	Ballpark
1929	1	Henderson Bunnies	Class C	Piedmont League	None	Lassiter Park
1930–1931	2	Henderson Gamecocks	Class C	Piedmont League	None	Lassiter Park

== Year–by–year records ==
Year	Record	Finish	Manager	Playoffs/Notes
1929	54–85	5th	Bunny Hearn / Guy Winston / Lewis Murphy / Lee Gooch	Did not qualify
1930	78–63	1st	Jimmy Teague	League pennant Lost in Finals
1931	51–82	7th	Jimmy Teague / Mack Arnette	Did not qualify

== Notable alumni ==
- Larry Boerner (1929)
- Cap Clark (1931)
- Lee Gooch (1929, MGR)
- Bunny Hearn (1929, MGR)
- Carl Husta (1929)
- John Jones (1929–1930)
- Ike Kahdot (1930–1931)
- Joe Poetz (1930)
- Eddie Wilson (1930)
- Mutt Wilson (1930)
- Hank Winston (1930)
- Henderson Bunnies players
- Henderson Gamecocks players
