= High Point Furniture Makers =

- 1920–1922; (1920–1932); High Point, North Carolina

Minor league affiliations
- Class: Class D (1920); Class C (1921–1932)
- League: Piedmont League (1920–1932)

Major league affiliations
- Team: New York Giants (1932)

Minor league titles
- League titles (0): None
- Conference titles (2): 1922; 1928
- Wild card berths (0): None

Team data
- Name: High Point Furniture Makers (1920–1922); High Point Pointers (1923–1932)
- Ballpark: Welch Field (1920–1928); Willis Park (1929–1932)

The High Point Furniture Makers were a minor league baseball team based in High Point, North Carolina. From 1920 to 1932, High Point teams played exclusively as members of the Class C level Piedmont League, winning league pennants in 1922 and 1928. The team became known as the High Point "Pointers" in 1923.

High Point hosted minor league games at two different ballparks in the era. The team played at Welch Field from 1920 to 1928, before moving to Willis Park in 1929 through 1932.

In 1932, High Point hosted two separate teams in the Piedmont League, the second playing as a New York Giants minor league affiliate.

The "Furniture Makers" nickname corresponded to the large furniture manufacturing industry in High Point in the era.

== History ==
=== 1920 to 1922: Piedmont League / High Point Furniture Makers ===
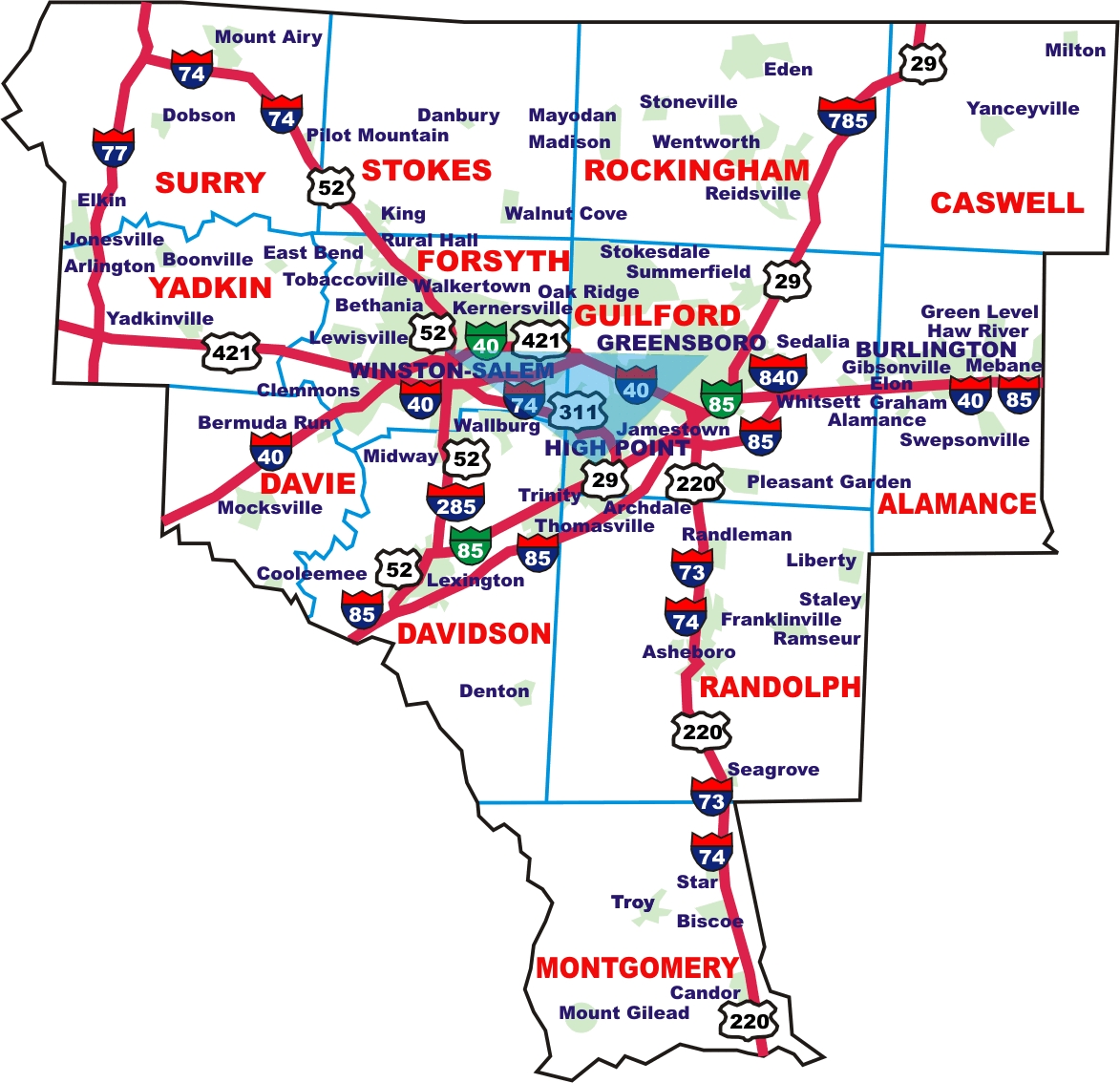
Major roads and cities within the Piedmont Triad and adjoining area. The blue triangle highlights the "Triad," including High Point.

High Point, North Carolina first hosted league baseball play in 1920, when the High Point "Furniture Makers" became charter members of the six–team Class D level Piedmont League. The Danville Tobacconists, Durham Bulls, Greensboro Patriots, Raleigh Nats and Winston-Salem Twins teams joined with High Point to begin league play on April 21, 1920.

The Piedmont League was named for the region, as the league member teams were located in the Piedmont plateau and Piedmont Triad regions in the eastern United States.

The High Point use of the "Furniture Makers" nickname corresponds with local history and the manufacturing industry in the era of the baseball team. High Point has a lengthy history as a being a hub for the furniture manufacturing industry. High Point has been called the "Furniture Making capital of America." Today, there are over 100 furniture stores and outlets in High Point.

Founded in 1909, today, the High Point Market furniture showcase is held twice annually with over 11 million square feet (1 km^{2}) 2,000 exhibitors and utilizes 180 buildings. The event highlights retail vendors and pays homage to the city's furniture making history in the process. Between 70,000 and 80,000 attendees attend each session and the market has contributed an estimated $6.7 billion to the area's economy in its history.

(2001) Giant chest of drawers, High Point, North Carolina.

As a symbol of the furniture making industry in High Point, the World's Largest Chest of Drawers was constructed in 1926. At 32 feet tall, the chest of drawers is still standing today as a landmark in High Point. They are located at 508 Hamilton Street in High Point.

High Point hired Bill Piere as manager during the 1920 season, Pierre had managed both the Lakeland Highlanders of the Florida State League and the Augusta Dollies of the South Atlantic League in 1919. Following his stint with the Furniture Makers, Pierre later became a major league scout for the Detroit Tigers, signing Don Bryant among others.

Beginning Piedmont League play on April 21, 1920, the High Point furniture makers placed third in the six–team Piedmont League regular season standings. The High Point franchise began hosting home minor leagues at Welch Field. The Furniture Makers ended the regular season with a record of 57–57, playing the season under managers Dick Miller and Bill Pierre. High Point finished 9.0 games behind the first place Greensboro Patriots in the final Piedmont League regular season standings. The Furniture Makers did not qualify for the two–team playoffs won by the Greensboro over the second place Raleigh Nats. High Point pitcher Jess "Rube" Eldridge led the Piedmont League with a 1.35 ERA.

Player/manager Dick Miller hit .282 with 4 home runs in 56 games for High Point in 1920. Miller ended the season playing for the Wilson Bugs of the Class B level Virginia League, where he hit .366 in 44 games. Miller remained with Wilson for the next two seasons, which were the last of his minor league career.

Pitching for the Furniture Makers at age 31, Rube Eldridge was a native of Elkin, North Carolina, who began his professional career in 1909. The left-handed Eldridge compiled a 13–6 record with his 1.36 ERA pitching for High Point in 1920, also pitching briefly for the Columbus Senators and Charlotte Hornets in 1920. Eldridge would pitch for High Point through 1925 before returning in 1927. Eldridge was nicknamed "The Duke of Spero." On July 16, 1920, High Point purchased Eldridge from Charlotte for cash.

On July 20, 1920, Eldridge made his debut with High Point, pitching the Furniture Makers to a doubleheader victory over Raleigh 3-1 and 1–0 in winning both games. On August 7, 1920, Eldridge pitched a seven-hit 1–0 shutout against the Greensboro Patriots. after the game, Eldridge was sold to the Columbus Senators, a move effective at the end of the Piedmont League. High Point revelated that the team received an amount that "greatly" exceeded $999 in the transaction.

Left-handed pitcher Raleigh Aitchison played for the Furniture Makers in 1921. In his final season of professional play as a player at age 33, Aitchison was attempting to comeback after having been away from the game due to a condition called an “ulcerated jaw.” Atchison compiled a 1–3 record with a 6.84 ERA, pitching in 6 games for the Pointers.

Continuing in their second season of play, the High Point Furniture Makers placed second in the 1921 Piedmont League pennant. The Furniture makers placed first in the six–team Piedmont League regular season standings, as the league was upgraded to become a Class C level league. ending the regular season with a record of 65–55, playing under returning manager Bill Pierre. High Point finished 3.0 games behind the first place Raleigh Red Birds in the Piedmont League regular season standings and qualified for the two–team playoff as the league played a split season schedule. The Greensboro Patriots defeated the High Point 4 games to 1 in the Finals. First baseman Red Holt of High Point led the Piedmont League with both 26 home runs and 118 RBI. High Point pitcher Thomas Day led the Piedmont League in winning percentage, with a .875 mark and a 14–2 record.

At age 30, player/manager Hardin Herndon played in 118 games for High Point, hitting .286. A first baseman, Herndon played for the Class D level Lindale Pepperells in 1921 before joining High Point as manager. Herndon began a four-season tenure as the High Point player/manager.

In their final season as the Furniture Makers, High Point won the league pennant. The 1922 Furniture Makers continued play and won the 1922 Piedmont League pennant, as eight–team Piedmont League played a split season schedule. With a record of 70–55, playing under manager Hardin Herndon, the Furniture Makers finished 2.5 games ahead of the second place Durham Bulls in the final regular season standings. High Point qualified for the two–team playoff, be winning the first half pennant in the split season schedule. The Second half pennant was won Durham. In the final, Durham defeated 4 games to 3.

Rube Eldridge compiled a 26–9 record with a 2.76 ERA pitching for High Point in 1922, throwing 296 innings on the season.

=== 1923 and 1924: Piedmont League / High Point Pointers ===
In 1923, the franchise became known under the High Point "Pointers" nickname. The Pointers continued High Point's membership in the six–team Class C level Piedmont League. The Danville Tobacconists, Durham Bulls, Greensboro Patriots, Raleigh Capitals, and Winston-Salem Twins teams joined High Point as the 1923 Piedmont league continued play.

As defending champions, High Point ended the 1923 season in third place in the overall Piedmont League final standings. High Point ended the Piedmont League regular season with record of 65–58, managed by the returning Hardin Herndon. The Pointers finished 9.0 games behind the first place Danville Tobacconists in the overall standings. High Point did not qualify for the playoff, as Greensboro won the first half pennant in the split season schedule and Danille won the second half pennant. In the final, Danville defeated Greensboro. Player/manager Hardin Herndon batted .288, while playing in 76 games for High Point. John Kane of High Point had 189 total hits on the season to lead the Piedmont League. Rube Eldridge compiled a 27–10 record with a 3.79 ERA pitching for High Point in 1923. His 27 wins led the Piedmont league.

Second place in 1924 six-team Piedmont league Record of 71–52 returning manager Hardin Herndon No playoffs held, 4.5 games behind the first place Durham Bulls. Player/manager Harry Herndon hit .284 with 14 home runs and 31 doubles in 119 games. Arnold Townsend of High Point hit 27 home runs with 102 RBI to lead the Piedmont League in both categories, while Loren Thrasher led the league with both 160 hits and 93 runs scored.

On August 2, 1924, Rube Eldridge quit the High Point team on. On August 11, 1924, Eldridge says he did not quit the High Point team and turned down an offer of $400 a month from a high-level independent team in Mt. Carmel, Pennsylvania.

=== 1925 and 1926: Relocations with Danville ===
The High Point Pointers continued play in the Class C level Piedmont League in 1925, before the franchise relocated during the season, On June 18, 1925, the Pointers had compiled a record of 18–32, when the team moved to Danville, Virginia and finished the season as the Danville Leafs. The team had a 40–35 record while based in Danville and was managed by Hardin Herndon and Lloyd Smith during the season. Despite being replaced as manager, Hardin Herndon remained with the team for the entire season, hitting .301 in 118 games with 14 home runs at age 33. Ending the season with an overall record of 58–67 overall and in third place, High Point/Danville finished 18.5 games behind first place Winston-Salem Twins in the overall standings. In the split season schedule of the league the Durham Bulls won the first half pennant and Winston-Salem won the second half pennant. Durham then won in the final over the Twins in seven games.

The Piedmont League began the 1926 season without a High Point team, as the Danville Leafs continued play in the Piedmont league, which played a split season schedule. However Danville would return to High Point during the season. On May 12, 1926, the Danville Leafs had compiled a 11–10 record when the franchise relocated back to High Point, 11 months after leaving their former host city. After compiling a 63–41 record while based in High Point, the team ended the season with an overall record of 74–51. The Pointers finished in second place, while playing the season under manager Bob Higgins in both locations. High Point/Danville finished just 1.0 game behind the first place Greensboro Patriots in the overall standings. However, with the split season schedule, High Point did not qualify for the playoff as Durham won the first half of the split season schedule and third place Durham Bulls (73–71) won the second half pennant. Greensboro the defeated Durham in the final.

In 1926, Pointers pitcher Ray Phelps compiled a 27–8 record pitching in 40 games for High Point, at age 22. He led the Piedmont league both wins and strikeouts with 151. Phelps played a partial season in returning to High Point in 1927 before beginning a three-season tenure pitching with the Jacksonville Tars. In 1930, Phelps made his major league debut with the Brooklyn Dodgers.

High Point player (and future manager) Dan Boone won the 1926 Piedmont League batting title, hitting .399. Boone also hit 28 home runs and 214 total hits on the season while playing exclusively at first base. Boone's 117 RBI and 112 runs scored also led the Piedmont League. Boone had been a pitcher in the major leagues from 1919 to 1923, with the Philadelphia Athletics, Detroit Tigers and Cleveland Indians compiling an 8–13 record in 42 games.

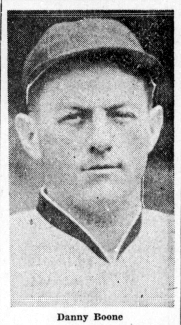
(1928) Dan Boone, newspaper. Boone served as the player/manager for High Point from 1926 to 1931. As a player for High Point, Boone batted .419 in 1928 and hit 46 home runs in 1929. He won four league batting championships.

=== 1927 to 1931: Piedmont League ===
The 1927 Piedmont League was a Class C level league and played the season as a six team league with split season schedule. High Point ended the season in fifth place in the overall league standings. High Point ended the season with a record of 62–82 playing the season under managers Pop Kitchens (34–33), Specs Smith (3–11) and Dan Boone (25–38). The Pointers ended the season 22.0 games behind the first place Rocky Mount Buccaneers in the overall standings. the Raleigh Capitals won the first half of the split season schedule, and the Salisbury-Spencer Colonials won the second half, Salisbury then defeated Raleigh in the final. High Point's Moose Clabaugh won the Piedmont League batting title, hitting .363 with a league leading 187 total hits, along with 21 home runs. One season earlier, Clabaugh had hit 62 home runs in 1926 while playing with the Tyler Trojans in the East Texas League, setting a minor league record before ending the season playing in the major leagues for the Brooklyn Robins. The right field foul pole was at 250 feet in the Tyler ballpark.

At age 32, player/manager Dan Boone began five season tenure as the High Point player/manager, hitting .342 in 18 games with 12 home runs and 27 doubles while playing in the outfield. Did not qualify

At age 37, Rube Eldridge pitched his final season for High Point in 1927, ending the season with a 15–12 record, pitching in 27 games. After his High Point tenure ended, Eldridge pitched in the minor leagues through 1934, winning an estimated 285 games in his minor league career.

The 1928 High Point pointers tied for the Piedmont League pennant. High Point ended the season with a record of 83–52, tied with Winston-Salem Twins, who finished 82–51. The Pointers advanced to the league finals, playing under returning player/manager Dan Boone, who led the team with a noteworthy season. High Point lost in the Piedmont League finals to the Winston-Salem, 4 games to 3.

Player/manager Daniel Boone won the P1edmont League Triple Crown in 1928, hitting .419 with 38 home runs and 131 RBI and leading the league in all three categories, while playing in 128 games. Boone hit 11 triples and 40 doubles with 198 total hits on the season.

Beginning Piedmont League play on April 24, 1929, the Pointers placed fifth in the six–team Piedmont League regular season standings. High Point finished 19.5 games behind the first place Durham Bulls in the final Piedmont League regular season standings. The Pointers did not qualify for the two–team playoffs won by the second place Greensboro Patriots over Durham. High Point pitcher Howell Conklin led the Piedmont League with 160 strikeouts.

At age 33, player/manager Daniel Boone hit a league leading 46 home runs while batting .372 to win the Piedmont League batting title for the third time. Boone also led the league with 116 runs scored and 191 total hits, while playing in 140 games in 1929.

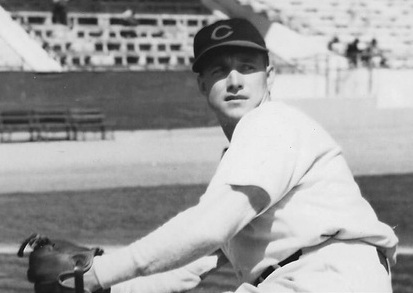
Bucky Walters, Cincinnati Reds. Walters played his first professional season with High Point playing 3B and pitching. After beginning his career as an infielder, Walter became an MVP pitcher in the major leagues.

Bucky Walters played third base for High Point in 1929, in his first professional season, hitting .296 with 7 home runs while playing in 90 games. He also pitched in 16 games for High Point, with a 6.08 ERA and a 5–6 record. He would not pitch again for five seasons. Walters first made the major leagues as a position player, before returning for an extensive career as a pitcher. After playing another minor league season following his season with High Point, Walters broke into the majors as a third baseman for the Boston Braves in 1931.

The Philadelphia Phillies obtained Walters from the Boston Red Sox on June 14, 1934. After playing 80 games at third base, he was converted into a pitcher at age 25. Walters debuted as pitcher for Philadelphia on September 24, 1934, pitching two perfect innings against the Brooklyn Dodgers. After his successful relief appearance, the Phillies gave him a start six days later against the Boston Braves, where he pitched five innings and gave up one run.

In 1939, pitching with the Cincinnati Reds, Walters won the pitching Triple Crown, leading the National League with 27 victories, a 2.29 ERA, and 137 strikeouts. Walters won the Most Valuable Player award that season, in which he also batted .325 with 16 RBI.

Walters helped the Cincinnati Reds win the 1940 World Series. Pitching in Game 2 against the Detroit on October 3, 1940, Walters pitched a complete game in a 5-3 Reds victory. Four days later, Walters evened the Series for the Reds in Game 6 with a complete game, five-hitter and another shutout in a 4–0 win. He also became the first pitcher in 14 years to hit a home run in the World Series, with his 8th inning home run in Game 6.

In his 16-season major league pitching career, Walters had a career 198–160 won–lost record with 1,107 strikeouts and a 3.30 ERA in 3,104 innings and 428 appearances, with a 1.34 WHIP. Walters threw 242 complete games and 42 shutouts during his career.

The 1930 High Point pointers finished the season in last place, as the Piedmont League was one of only two Class C level leagues that played in 1930, along with the Middle Atlantic League. The Pointers placed sixth in the six–team Piedmont League regular season standings. High Point ended the regular season with a record of 64–76, playing under returning player/manager Dan Boone. High Point finished 13.5 games behind the first place Henderson Gamecocks in the Piedmont League regular season standings. With their last place finish, High Point did not qualify for the two–team playoff won by the second place Durham Bulls over Henderson in seven games. Pitcher Richard Durham of High Point led the Piedmont League with 22 wins on the season.

Playing in 128 games, player/manager Dan Boone won the league batting title for the fourth time, hitting .385. Boone also hit 25 home runs and 46 doubles on the season, his final full season with High Point.

The 1931 High Point Pointers again finished the season last place as the Piedmont League expanded to become an eight–team Piedmont League. The league added the Asheville Tourists and Charlotte Hornets franchises after the South Atlantic League folded following the 1930 season. The Pointers player manager Dan Boone left the team after the pointers began the season with a 31–59 record. With a record of 39–81, playing the remainder of the season under managers Hobe Brummitt (6–18) and Tom Young (2–14), the Pointers finished 42.5 games behind the first place Charlotte Hornets in the final regular season standings. With their eighth-place finish, High Point did not qualify for the two–team playoff, won by the Charlotte over the second place Raleigh Capitals.

At age 21, Fred Sington ended his first professional season playing for High Point, hitting .340 in 12 games after beginning the 1931 season with the Jackson Senators of the Class D level Cotton States League. Singleton had just graduated college, where he was a two-time All America tackle for the Alabama Crimson Tide football teams. The team "Singleton Soaring Award" is named in his honor. Singleton was elected to the College Football Hall of Fame in 1955. In baseball, following his season with High Point, Singleton played in the major leagues with the Washington Senators and Brooklyn Dodgers from 1934 to 1939, before his career was interrupted by military service during World War II.

in 73 games with High Point, player//manager Daniel Boone hit .388 with 20 home runs. Boone played the end of the season with the York White Roses of the Class B level New York-Penn League, hitting .348 in 48 games. In 1932, Boone became the player/manager of the Charleston Senators of the Middle Atlantic League, where his two-season tenure marked the last seasons of his professional career.

=== 1932 Piedmont League: Two teams in one season ===
The 1932 Piedmont League continued play as an eight-team Class C level league. By the end of the 1932 season, High Point had hosted two separate teams in the league during the season.

The High Point Pointers began the 1932 season continuing their league membership, playing as members of the eight-team Piedmont League alongside the Asheville Tourists, Charlotte Hornets, Durham Bulls (Philadelphia Phillies affiliate), Greensboro Patriots (St. Louis Cardinals), Raleigh Capitals, Wilmington Pirates (Boston Red Sox) and the Winston-Salem Twins (New York Giants). On July 7, 1932, the High Point Pointers team disbanded, along with the Asheville Tourists franchise, leaving the Piedmont League with six remaining teams. High Point had compiled a 33–39 record when the team folded, playing under manager Buddy Tanner to that point.

High Point later regained a second league team before the conclusion of the 1932 season. On August 20, 1932, the Winston-Salem Twins franchise moved to High Point, where the team remained for the remainder of the season and High Point hosted their second "Pointers" team in the Piedmont League. The Twins were a minor league affiliate of the New York Giants and had a record of 18–28 at the time of their relocation to High Point. After compiling a record of 50–38 while based in High Point, the Winston-Salem/High Point team ended the season with a final record of 58–66. Their final record left the Pointers team in third place, playing the season under Harry Wilke, who managed the team in both locations. Parker Perry played for the team in both the Winston=Salem and High Point locations, hitting 19 home runs to lead the Piedmont League.

For player/manager Harry Wilke, the 1932 season was his final season in professional baseball at age 31. Wilke had played in the major leagues for the 1927 Chicago Cubs.

Hank Leiber hit .362 with the 1932 Winston-Salem/High Point team in the Piedmont League season. Leiber made his major league with the New York Giants in April 1933. Leiber was named to three All-Star teams in his major league career.

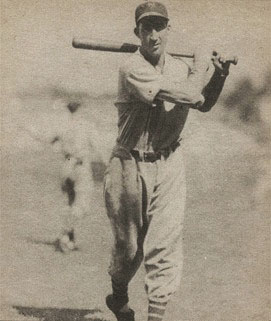
(1940) Harry Danning, New York Giants, baseball card. Danning played for High Point in 1932 and hit .313, before beginning his major league career in 1932. Danning was a four-time major league All-star catcher.

Catcher Harry Danning played for the Winston-Salem/High Point team in 1932, hitting .313 with 4 home runs in 50 games. Danning had signed a $150-a-month contract to begin his professional career. Danning made his major league debut with the New York Giants in 1933. Danning was selected for the National League All-Star team in four consecutive years from 1938 to 1941. He was on the 1933 World Series champion New York Giants team that defeated the Washington Senators in the 1933 World Series, and appeared in the pennant-winning clubs that were defeated by the New York Yankees in the 1936 and 1937 World Series. On June 15, 1940, Danning hit for the cycle in a game against the Pittsburgh Pirates. On October 14, 1940, Danning and his wife lost twins who were born prematurely.

Following the 1942 season, Danning entered military service during World War II and never resumed his playing career. Danning served at the Long Beach Army Air Field, until he received a medical discharge in June 1945 due to arthritis in both of his knees.

In 1933, the Piedmont League continued play as a six-team league but without a High Point franchise. Despite relocating the previous season, the Winston-Salem Twins resumed play as members of the 1933 Piedmont League, but the High Point did not. The High Point Pointers were replaced by the Richmond Colts franchise, who joined the Piedmont League after their tenure as members of the Eastern League ended when that league folded following the 1932 season.

High Point, North Carolina next hosted minor league baseball in 1948. That season, High Point partnered with neighboring Thomasville, North Carolina to form the High Point-Thomasville Hi-Toms, which continued the Thomasville Dodgers membership in the Class D level North Carolina State League. The Hi-Toms were a Boston Braves affiliate, beginning a five-season tenure in the league.

== The ballparks ==
Beginning in 1920, High Point hosted home minor league games at Welch Field. The ballpark was located at Hay Street & Kivett Drive in High Point. Welch Field was privately owned and also hosted football practices in the era.

In 1929, the High Point Pointers began hosting minor league home games at Willis Park. The ballpark was located on Burton Road in the era. The ballpark also hosted the High Point Red Sox of the Negro Leagues. in the 1933 season, the ballpark hosted a game between Winston-Salem and Greensboro on August 20. Greensboro served as the home team, winning the game by the score of 4–1 behind pitcher Rube Eldridge. On January 6, 1935, an afternoon fire with a “mysterious origin” destroyed the grandstand at Willis Park. Two other sets of bleachers were not destroyed. The ballpark owner was W.T. Willis.

== Timeline ==
Year(s)	# Yrs.	Team	Level	League	Affiliate	Ballpark
1920	1	High Point Furniture Makers	Class D	Piedmont League	None	Welch Field
1921–1922	2	High Point Furniture Makers	Class C	Piedmont League	None	Welch Field
1923–1928	6	High Point Pointers	Class C	Piedmont League	None	Welch Field
1929–1932	4	High Point Pointers	Class C	Piedmont League	None	Willis Park
1932 (2)	0.5	High Point Pointers	Class C	Piedmont League	New York Giants	Willis Park

== Year–by–year records ==
Year	Record	Finish	Manager	Playoffs/Notes
1920	57–57	3rd	Dick Miller / Bill Pierre	Did not qualify
1921	65–55	2nd	Bill Pierre	Lost League Finals
1922	70–55	1st	Hardin Herndon	Won first half pennant Lost League Finals
1923	65–58	3rd	Hardin Herndon	Did not qualify
1924	71–52	2nd	Hardin Herndon	No playoffs held
1925	58–67	3rd	Hardin Herndon / Lloyd Smith	Team (18–32) moved to Danville June 18; Did not qualify
1926	74–51	2nd	Bob Higgins	Danville (11–10) moved to High Point May 12; Did not qualify
1927	62–82	5th	Pop Kitchens (34–33) / Specs Smith (3–11); Dan Boone (25–38)	Did not qualify
1928	83–52	1st (tie)	Dan Boone	Tied for league pennant Lost League Finals
1929	67–72	4th	Dan Boone	Did not qualify
1930	64–76	6th	Dan Boone	Did not qualify
1931	39–91	8th	Dan Boone (31–59) / Hobe Brummitt (6–18); Tom Young (2–14)	Did not qualify
1932 (1)	33–39	NA	Buddy Tanner	Team disbanded July 7
1932 (2)	50–38	3rd	Harry Wilke	Winston-Salem (18–28) moved to High Point August 20; Did not qualify

== Notable alumni ==
- Fred Sington (1931) Inducted College Football Hall of Fame (1955)
- Jose Acosta (1928)
- Bill Akers (1926)
- Ángel Aragón (1925–1926)
- Raleigh Aitchison (1921)
- Cliff Bolton (1927–1928)
- Dan Boone (1927–1931, MGR)
- Moose Clabaugh (1927)
- Harry Danning (1932) 4x MLB All-Star
- Skipper Friday (1925)
- Sid Graves (1930)
- Bob Higgins (1926, MGR)
- Goldie Holt (1931)
- Red Holt (1921)
- John Jones (1931)
- Doc Land (1931)
- Tom Lanning (1930–1931)
- Hank Leiber (1930) 3x MLB All-Star
- Wes Livengood (1931)
- Joe Malay (1931)
- Guy Morton (1930–1931)
- Tim Murchison (1931)
- Herbert Murphy (1921)
- Scott Perry (1927)
- Ray Phelps (1926–1927)
- Jack Salveson (1931)
- Fred Sington (1930–1931)
- Scottie Slayback (1931)
- Al Smith (1932) MLB All-Star
- Walter Stephenson (1931)
- Tip Tobin (1931)
- Ira Townsend (1931)
- Pat Veltman (1931)
- Bob Vines (1928)
- Bucky Walters (1929) Cincinnati Reds Hall of Fame
- Johnny Watson (1931)
- Hal Weafer (1930)
- Bill Whaley (1931)
- Harry Wilke (1932, MGR)
- Pep Young (1929)

== See also ==
- High Point Furniture Makers players
- High Point Pointers players
