= Eddie Wilson (baseball) =

American baseball player (1909-1979)

- Right fielder
- Born: September 7, 1909; Hamden, Connecticut, U.S.
- Died: April 11, 1979 (aged 69); Hamden, Connecticut, U.S.
- Batted: Left Threw: Left

MLB debut
- June 22, 1936, for the Brooklyn Dodgers

Last MLB appearance
- October 2, 1937, for the Brooklyn Dodgers

MLB statistics
- Batting average: .317
- Home runs: 4
- Runs batted in: 33
- Stats at Baseball Reference

Teams
- Brooklyn Dodgers (1936–1937)

Edward Francis Wilson (September 7, 1909 – April 11, 1979) was an American professional baseball player. He played parts of two seasons in Major League Baseball for the Brooklyn Dodgers in 1936 and 1937, primarily as a right fielder.

== Playing career ==
=== Amateur career ===
Wilson was a triple threat athlete at Hillhouse High School in New Haven, Connecticut starring in football, basketball and baseball, captaining both football and baseball teams in his senior year. Emmons Chick Bowens, renowned football, basketball and baseball coach at Hillhouse High, considered Eddie to be one of the most accomplished all-around athletes to come out of Connecticut. He went on to play college ball at College of the Holy Cross.

=== Minor leagues ===
Wilson broke into professional baseball at 19 in the Eastern League with the New Haven Profs. He also appeared in the International League for Baltimore in 8 games that season, batting .290. The next season, he batted .313 for the Henderson Gamecocks of the Piedmont League where he was an All-Star.

Wilson played for Springfield in 1933 in the Mid-Atlantic League, where he hit .337 and had 25 stolen bases in 30 attempts. Overall, he had 66 home runs and 620 RBI during his minor league career, which lasted from 1929 to 1941.

=== Major leagues ===
In his major league career, Wilson had 72 hits, 39 runs, 12 doubles, 2 triples, 4 home runs, 33 RBI and 4 stolen bases.

== Personal life ==
Wilson volunteered for service in the Merchant Marines during World War II and was a school teacher.

Wilson died in 1979 at age 69, and is buried at St. Lawrence Cemetery in West Haven, Connecticut.
