= George Scherger =

American baseball player, coach, and manager

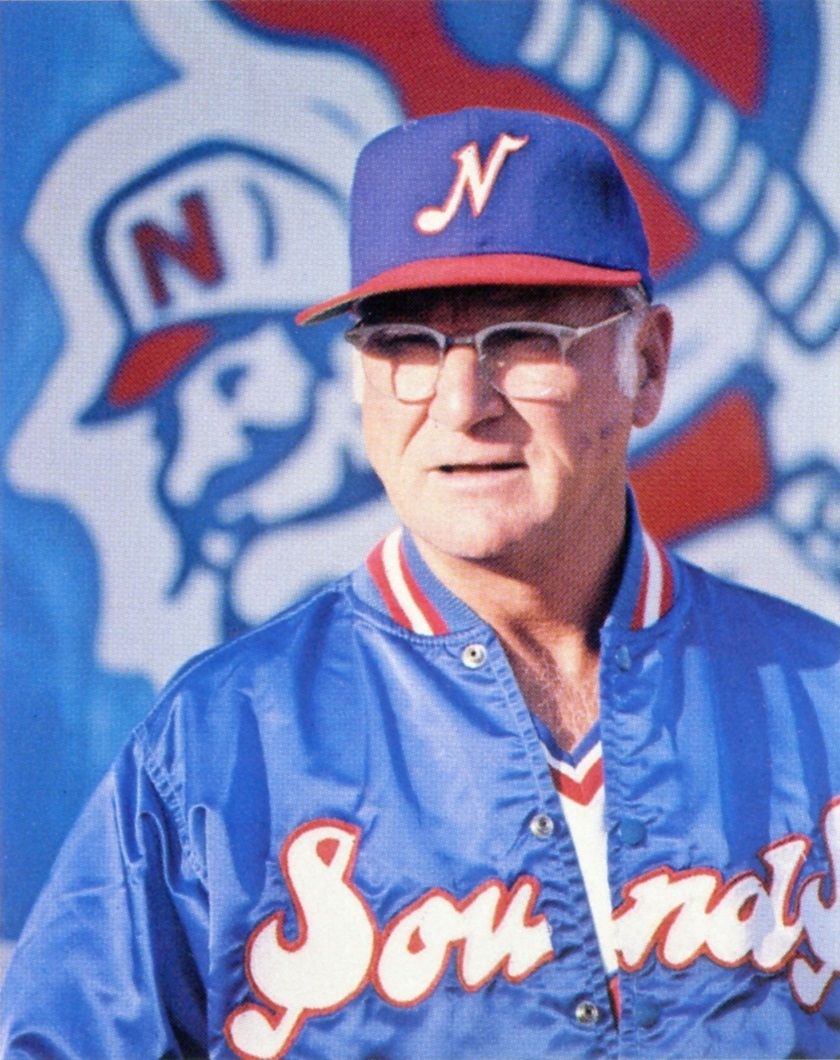
- Scherger with the Nashville Sounds in 1979
- Coach
- Born: November 10, 1920; Dickinson, North Dakota, U.S.
- Died: October 13, 2011 (aged 90); Charlotte, North Carolina, U.S.
- Batted: Right Threw: Right
- Stats at Baseball Reference

Teams
- Cincinnati Reds (1970–1978, 1983–1986)

Career highlights and awards
- 2× World Series champion (1975, 1976)

George Richard Scherger (November 10, 1920 – October 13, 2011) was an American professional baseball player, coach, and manager.

He played as an infielder for 19 seasons in the Brooklyn/Los Angeles Dodgers minor league organization, serving as a player-manager for the last ten. He then spent 19 years in the Cincinnati Reds system. He managed Reds' farm clubs for six seasons and served on the major league coaching staff for 13 seasons.

== Early life ==
Scherger was born on November 10, 1920, in Dickinson, North Dakota. His family later moved to Buffalo, New York. There, he played football, basketball, and baseball at St. Joseph's Collegiate Institute from which he graduated in 1940.

== Playing career ==
After high school, Scherger signed with the Brooklyn Dodgers. He made his professional debut in 1940 as a second baseman with the Superior Blues of the Class D Northern League. He also played that season for the Class D Newport Dodgers. His 1941 and 1942 seasons were spent with the Class D Olean Oilers and Kingsport Dodgers, respectively. Scherger enlisted in the United States Army during World War II, which placed him in charge of the gymnasium at Fort Bragg.

Scherger returned to play in 1946 for the Class B Danville Dodgers of the Illinois–Indiana–Iowa League. Through four years of competition, he held a .258 batting average with 285 hits, 42 doubles, 17 triples, and 5 home runs. In 1947, the Dodgers made Scherger player-manager of the Kingston Dodgers, a Class D team competing in the North Atlantic League. The team would win the league pennant, but Scherger was transferred to the Thomasville Dodgers (Class D, North Carolina State League) midseason. His 1948 campaign with the Olean Oilers (Class D, Pennsylvania–Ontario–New York League) was, offensively, Scherger's best of his career. He hit .324 with 161 hits, 49 doubles, 6 triples, and 3 home runs. He then spent two years (1949–50) with the Trois-Rivières Royals (Class C, Canadian–American League). He led his 1951 Ponca City Dodgers (Class D) to win the Kansas-Oklahoma-Missouri League pennant. After two years with the Santa Barbara Dodgers (Class C, California League), Scherger managed the Newport News Dodgers (Class B, Piedmont League) to win the 1954 playoff championship and the 1955 regular season pennant. He played his final season in 1956 with the Cedar Rapids Raiders of the Illinois–Indiana–Iowa League.

Scherger left baseball after 1956, choosing to settle with his family in Charlotte, North Carolina, where he worked in a supermarket.

== Managerial career ==
In 1961, Scherger returned to the Dodgers organization as manager of their Class D Panama City Fliers in the Alabama–Florida League. He managed the Ozark/Andalusia Dodgers of the same circuit in 1962. He was skipper of the Salisbury Dodgers (Class A, Western Carolinas League) in 1963 and 1964, where he was awarded back-to-back Manager of the Year Awards and won the league championship in 1964. After the 1965 campaign with the St. Petersburg Saints (Class A, Florida State League), Scherger left baseball again, sitting out the 1966 season.

After 19 years with the Dodgers, Scherger joined the Cincinnati Reds organization in 1967. He managed the Florida State League's Tampa Tarpons and the Reds' Florida Instructional League team in both 1967 and 1968. Cincinnati farm director Sheldon "Chief" Bender placed Scherger in charge of their minor league spring training camp in 1969. During the season, he led their rookie-level Gulf Coast League Reds and continued to lead the winter league team as well.

When Sparky Anderson was named manager of the Reds for the 1970 season, Scherger was hired as bench coach. As the playing skipper of the Class C Santa Barbara Dodgers in 1953, Scherger was Anderson's first manager in pro baseball. He continued on Anderson's Cincinnati staff for nine years, later serving as first base coach and at third. During that time, the Reds won five National League West Division titles, four National League pennants, and two World Series. Reds general manager Dick Wagner dismissed the entire coaching staff after the 1978 season.

Scherger was then assigned to the Double-A Nashville Sounds of the Southern League. He led the team to win the league championship and was selected to coach the 1979 Southern League All-Star team. He returned to Class A Tampa in 1980, and led the Double-A Waterbury Reds of the Eastern League in 1981. In 1982, he managed the Triple-A Indianapolis Indians of the American Association. The Indians won the championship, and Scherger won the Sporting News Minor League Manager of the Year Award.

Scherger joined the Reds' major league staff after the 1982 season. He continued as bench coach for manager Russ Nixon for four years until retiring after the 1986 season. He was described by former Reds' star and manager Pete Rose as the "smartest baseball mind in the world". He briefly returned to manage Nashville, now at Triple-A in the American Association, in 1988, but retired for good after only one game.
