= Piedmont League =

American minor league baseball league

- Classification: Class D (1920); Class C (1921–1931); Class B (1932–1955)
- Sport: Baseball
- First season: 1920
- Folded: 1955
- No. of teams: 22
- Country: United States

The Piedmont League was a minor league baseball league that operated from 1920 through 1955. The league operated principally in the Piedmont plateau region in the eastern United States.

== Cities represented ==
The following cities hosted teams that were members of the Piedmont League (in alphabetical order):

- Asheville, North Carolina: Asheville Tourists (1931–1932; 1934–1942); (formerly of the South Atlantic League, 1924–1930)
- Charlotte, North Carolina: Charlotte Hornets (1931–1935); (formerly of the South Atlantic League, 1919–1930; 1937–1942, moved to the Tri-State League, 1946–1953, the South Atlantic League, 1954–1963, and the Southern League, (1964–1971)
- Colonial Heights, Virginia & Petersburg, Virginia: Colonial Heights-Petersburg Colts (1954)
- Columbia, South Carolina: Columbia Sandlappers (1934)
- Danville, Virginia: Danville Tobacconists (1920–1924); Danville Leafs (1925–1926)
- Durham, North Carolina: Durham Bulls (1920–33; 1936–1943)
- Greensboro, North Carolina: Greensboro Patriots (1920–1926; 1928–1934); Greensboro Red Sox (1941–1942)
- Hagerstown, Maryland: (formerly of the Interstate League, 1950–1952); Hagerstown Braves (1953); Hagerstown Packets (1954–1955)
- Henderson, North Carolina: Henderson Bunnies (1929); Henderson Gamecocks (1930–1931)
- High Point, North Carolina: High Point Furniture Makers (1920–1922); High Point Pointers (1923–1932)
- Lancaster, Pennsylvania: Lancaster Red Roses (1954–1955)
- Lynchburg, Virginia: Lynchburg Cardinals (1943–1955)
- Newport News, Virginia: Newport News Dodgers (1944–1955)
- Norfolk, Virginia: Norfolk Tars (1934–1955)
- Portsmouth, Virginia: Portsmouth Truckers (1935); Portsmouth Cubs (1936–1952); Portsmouth Merrimacs (1953–1955)
- Raleigh, North Carolina: Raleigh Nats (1920); Raleigh Red Birds (1921); Raleigh Capitals (1922–1928; 1930–1932)
- Richmond, Virginia: Richmond Colts (1933–1953)
- Roanoke, Virginia: Roanoke Red Sox (1943–1950); Roanoke Ro-Sox (1951–1953)
- Rocky Mount, North Carolina: Rocky Mount Buccaneers (1927) (moved to the Eastern Carolina League, 1928–1929); Rocky Mount Red Sox (1936–1940)
- Salisbury, North Carolina & Spencer, North Carolina: Salisbury Colonials (1925); Salisbury-Spencer Colonials (1926–1929)
- Sunbury, Pennsylvania: Sunbury Redlegs (1955)
- Wilmington, North Carolina: Wilmington Pirates (1932–1935)
- Winston-Salem, North Carolina: Winston-Salem Twins (1920–1933; 1937–1942)
- York, Pennsylvania: York White Roses (1953–1955); (formerly of the Interstate League, 1943–1952)

== Standings & statistics ==
=== Years 1920 to 1955 ===
==== 1920 Piedmont League ====
Team standings	W	L	PCT	GB	Managers
Greensboro Patriots	69	51	.575	-	Charlie Carroll
Raleigh Nats	67	53	.558	2½	Joe Ward
High Point Furniture Makers	57	57	.500	9	Dick Miller / Bill Pierce
Winston-Salem Twins	56	65	.463	13½	Bill Shumaker / Eddie Brennan / Jim Kelly
Danville Tobacconists	54	65	.454	14½	J. Moore / Rebel Williams
Durham Bulls	53	65	.449	15	Frank Manush

Playoff: Greensboro 4 games, Raleigh 3

==== 1921 Piedmont League ====
Team standings	W	L	PCT	GB	Managers
Raleigh Red Birds	68	52	.567	-	Joe Ward
High Point Furniture Makers	65	55	.542	3	Bill Pierce
Greensboro Patriots	64	58	.525	5	Charlie Carroll
Winston-Salem Twins	62	58	.517	6	Charles Clancy
Durham Bulls	57	64	.471	11½	Frank Manush
Danville Tobacconists	46	75	.380	22½	Herb Murphy / Pat Devereaux

Playoff: Greensboro 4 games, High Point 1

==== 1922 Piedmont League ====
Team standings	W	L	PCT	GB	Managers
High Point Furniture Makers	70	55	.560	-	Hardin Herndon
Durham Bulls	69	58	.543	2	Lee Gooch
Winston-Salem Twins	66	59	.528	4	Charles Clancy
Greensboro Patriots	60	63	.488	9	Charlie Carroll
Raleigh Capitals	60	66	.476	10½	Vern Duncan
Danville Tobacconists	50	74	.403	17½	Tom Abbott

Playoff: Durham 4 games, High Point 3, one tie

==== 1923 Piedmont League ====
Team standings	W	L	PCT	GB	Managers
Danville Tobacconists	74	50	.597	-	Herb Murphy
Greensboro Patriots	66	58	.532	8	Charlie Carroll
High Point Pointers	66	58	.532	8	Hardin Herndon
Winston-Salem Twins	59	64	.480	14½	Bill Leard / Mike Fuhry
Raleigh Capitals	57	67	.460	17	Vern Duncan
Durham Bulls	49	74	.398	24½	Bill Pierre / Lee Gooch

Playoff: Danville 4 games, Greensboro 0

==== 1924 Piedmont League ====
Team standings	W	L	PCT	GB	Managers
Durham Bulls	74	46	.617	-	Bill Pierre / Art Bourg
High Point Pointers	71	52	.577	4½	Hardin Herndon
Greensboro Patriots	61	59	.508	13	Charlie Carroll
Winston-Salem Twins	59	62	.488	15½	Bill Jackson
Danville Tobacconists	53	67	.442	21	Herb Murphy
Raleigh Capitals	45	77	.369	30	Vern Duncan

==== 1925 Piedmont League ====
Team standings	W	L	PCT	GB	Managers
Winston-Salem Twins	77	49	.611	-	Charlie Carroll
Durham Bulls	68	58	.540	9	Art Bourg
Greensboro Patriots	61	63	.492	15	Lee Gooch / Hardin Herndon / Dick Smith
High Point Pointers / Danville Leafs	58	67	.464	18½	Lloyd Smith / Hardin Herndon
Raleigh Capitals	57	69	.452	20	Hardin Herndon / Charles Doak
Salisbury Colonials	54	69	.439	21½	Patsy O'Rourke / Red Stewart / Rowdy Elliott

High Point (18-32) moved to Danville June 18.
Playoff: Durham 4 games, Winston-Salem 3

==== 1926 Piedmont League ====
Team standings	W	L	PCT	GB	Managers
Greensboro Patriots	86	60	.589	-	Lee Gooch
Danville Leafs / High Point Pointers	85	61	.582	1	Bob Higgins
Durham Bulls	73	71	.507	12	Art Bourg / Lew McCarty
Salisbury-Spencer Colonials	69	75	.479	16	Moose Marshall
Winston-Salem Twins	64	81	.441	21½	Cy Chisholm / Crawford Gray; Red Irby / Walt Christensen; Art Bourg
Raleigh Capitals	57	86	.399	27½	Runt Marr / Bennie Allen / Charlie Carroll / Cy Chisholm; Vern Duncan

Danville (11-10) moved to High Point May 12.
Playoff: Greensboro 4 games, Durham 1

==== 1927 Piedmont League ====
Team standings	W	L	PCT	GB	Managers
Rocky Mount Buccaneers	84	60	.583	-	Lee Gooch
Salisbury-Spencer Colonials	83	62	.572	1½	George Whiteman
Winston-Salem Twins	79	64	.552	4½	Charles McMillan
Raleigh Capitals	77	70	.524	7½	Al Watt
High Point Pointers	62	82	.431	22	Pop Kitchens / Jay Smith / Dan Boone
Durham Bulls	48	95	.336	35½	Lew McCarty / Barney Cleveland / Possum Whitted

Playoff: Salibury-Spencer 3 games, Raleigh 2

==== 1928 Piedmont League ====
Team standings	W	L	PCT	GB	Managers
Winston-Salem Twins	82	51	.617	-	Bunny Hearn
High Point Pointers	83	52	.615	-	Dan Boone
Greensboro Patriots	76	56	.576	5½	Charlie Carroll
Salisbury-Spencer Colonials	61	74	.452	22	George Whiteman
Raleigh Capitals	56	74	.431	24½	Jim Viox; Henry Dawson / Stump Edington
Durham Bulls	40	91	.305	41	Possum Whitted

Playoff: Winston-Salem 4 games, High Point 3

==== 1929 Piedmont League ====
Team standings	W	L	PCT	GB	Managers
Durham Bulls	85	51	.625	-	Possum Whitted
Greensboro Patriots	83	54	.606	2½	Charlie Carroll
Winston-Salem Twins	77	63	.550	10	George Whiteman
High Point Pointers	67	72	.482	19½	Dan Boone
Henderson Bunnies	54	85	.388	32½	Bunny Hearn / Lew Murphy; Lee Gooch / Guy Winston
Salisbury Colonials	48	89	.350	37½	Jess Altenburg

Playoff: Greensboro 4 games, Durham 1

==== 1930 Piedmont League ====
Team standings	W	L	PCT	GB	Managers
Henderson Gamecocks	78	63	.553	-	Jim Teague
Durham Bulls	71	68	.511	6	Possum Whitted
Greensboro Patriots	70	71	.496	8	Everett Booe / Hobe Brummitt / Clay Hopper
Winston-Salem Twins	70	71	.496	8	Hal Weafer / Claude Joyner / Charlie Carroll / Johnny Brock
Raleigh Capitals	68	72	.486	9½	Pat Haley
High Point Pointers	64	76	.457	13½	Dan Boone

Playoff: Durham 4 games, Henderson 3

==== 1931 Piedmont League ====
Team standings	W	L	PCT	GB	Managers
Charlotte Hornets	100	37	.730	-	Guy Lacy
Raleigh Capitals	86	50	.630	13½	Odie Strain
Greensboro Patriots	81	56	.591	19	Johnny Kane
Asheville Tourists	66	67	.496	32	Ray Kennedy / Bobby Hipps
Durham Bulls	56	72	.438	39½	Possum Whitted
Winston-Salem Twins	55	79	.410	43½	Bunny Hearn / Stuffy McCrone
Henderson Gamecocks	51	82	.383	47	Jim Teague
High Point Pointers	39	91	.300	57½	Dan Boone / Hobe Brummitt / Thomas Young

Playoff: Charlotte 4 games, Raleigh 2

==== 1932 Piedmont League ====
Team standings	W	L	PCT	GB	Managers
Charlotte Hornets	80	53	.602	-	Guy Lacy
Greensboro Patriots	76	59	.563	5	Fred Myers
Winston-Salem Twins / High Point Pointers	68	66	.507	12½	Harry Wilke
Raleigh Capitals	65	71	.478	16½	Odie Strain
Wilmington Pirates	62	77	.446	21	Hal Weafer / Tweet Walsh
Durham Bulls	56	77	.421	24	Possum Whitted
Asheville Tourists	35	33	.515	NA	Joe Guyon
High Point Pointers	33	39	.458	NA	Buddy Tanner

Asheville and High Point disbanded July 7; Winston-Salem moved to High Point August 20
Playoff: Greensboro 4 games, Charlotte 3

==== 1933 Piedmont League ====
Team standings	W	L	PCT	GB	Managers
Greensboro Patriots	90	48	.652	-	Eddie Dyer / Bob Rice
Charlotte Hornets	80	61	.567	11½	Johnny Dobbs / Guy Lacy
Richmond Colts	73	68	.518	18½	Jack Onslow
Wilmington Pirates	70	68	.507	20	Blackie Carter
Durham Bulls	65	76	.461	26½	Bob Murray / Bill Skiff
Winston-Salem Twins	42	99	.298	49½	Jim Poole / Art Bourg

==== 1934 Piedmont League ====
Team standings	W	L	PCT	GB	Managers
Norfolk Tars	89	49	.645	-	Bill Skiff
Charlotte Hornets	87	51	.630	2	Tommy Taylor
Wilmington Pirates	64	74	.464	25	Blackie Carter / Harry McCurdy
Richmond Colts	60	78	.435	29	Ed Hendee / Charles Wade
Columbia Sandlappers / Asheville Tourists	55	78	.414	31½	Bill Laval / Possum Whitted
Greensboro Patriots	56	81	.409	32½	Bob Rice

Playoff: Norfolk 4 games, Charlotte 2

==== 1935 Piedmont League ====
Team standings	W	L	PCT	GB	Managers
Asheville Tourists	75	62	.547	-	Billy Southworth
Wilmington Pirates	69	65	.5149	4½	Harry McCurdy / Riley Parker
Richmond Colts	70	66	.5147	4½	Ed Rommel
Norfolk Tars	67	70	.489	8	Bill Skiff
Portsmouth Truckers	67	72	.482	9	Pip Koehler
Charlotte Hornets	62	75	.453	13	Frank O'Rourke

Playoff: Richmond 4 games, Asheville 2

==== 1936 Piedmont League ====
Team standings	W	L	PCT	GB	Managers
Norfolk Tars	93	50	.650	-	Johnny Neun
Durham Bulls	79	63	.556	13½	John Gooch
Richmond Colts	76	66	.535	16½	George Farrell / Frank Rodgers
Rocky Mount Red Sox	74	69	.517	19	Specs Toporcer
Portsmouth Cubs	66	77	.462	27	Pip Koehler
Asheville Tourists	40	103	.280	53	Billy Southworth

Playoffs: Norfolk 3 games, Richmond 0; Durham 3 games, Rocky Mount 1
Finals: Norfolk 3 games Durham 0

==== 1937 Piedmont League ====
Team standings	W	L	PCT	GB	Managers
Asheville Tourists	89	50	.640	-	Hal Anderson
Norfolk Tars	83	53	.610	4½	Johnny Neun
Portsmouth Cubs	75	62	.547	13	Elmer Yoter
Richmond Colts	72	66	.522	16½	Eddie Mooers
Durham Bulls	68	69	.496	20	Paul O'Malley
Rocky Mount Red Sox	67	75	.472	23½	Nemo Leibold
Charlotte Hornets	66	75	.468	24	Lee Head / Bill Rodgers / Alex McColl
Winston-Salem Twins	35	105	.250	54½	Alvin Crowder / Pepper Rhea; Phil Lundeen / Walt VanGrofski

Playoffs: Norfolk 3 games, Richmond 1; Portsmouth 3 games, Asheville 2
Finals Norfolk 3 games, Portsmouth 0

==== 1938 Piedmont League ====
Team standings	W	L	PCT	GB	Managers
Norfolk Tars	84	52	.618	-	Ray White
Charlotte Hornets	84	53	.613	½	Calvin Griffith
Rocky Mount Red Sox	70	64	.522	13	Herb Brett
Portsmouth Cubs	69	67	.507	15	Dick Luckey
Richmond Colts	66	72	.478	19	Lance Richbourg
Durham Bulls	64	71	.474	20½	Bill Hughes
Asheville Tourists	63	75	.457	22	Hal Anderson
Winston-Salem Twins	46	92	.333	39	Walt VanGrofski / Joe Prerost

Playoffs: Charlotte 3 games, Portsmouth 2; Rocky Mount 3 games, Norfolk 1
Finals: Charlotte 4 games, Rocky Mount 3

==== 1939 Piedmont League ====
Team standings	W	L	PCT	GB	Managers
Asheville Tourists	89	55	.618	-	Hal Anderson
Durham Bulls	75	65	.536	12	Oscar Roettger
Rocky Mount Red Sox	70	67	.511	15½	Herb Brett
Richmond Colts	70	71	.496	17½	Lance Richbourg
Portsmouth Cubs	66	71	.482	19½	James Keesey
Norfolk Tars	66	71	.482	19½	Ray White
Charlotte Hornets	68	74	.479	20	Calvin Griffith
Winston-Salem Twins	54	84	.391	32	Charles Clancy / Alvin Crowder

Playoffs: Asheville 3 games, Richmond 0; Rocky Mount 3 games, Durham 1
Finals: Asheville 4 games, Rocky Mount 2

==== 1940 Piedmont League ====
Team standings	W	L	PCT	GB	Managers
Richmond Colts	77	59	.566	-	Eddie Phillips
Asheville Tourists	75	60	.556	1½	Tommy West
Rocky Mount Red Sox	75	61	.551	2	Heinie Manush
Durham Bulls	73	62	.541	3½	Oscar Roettger
Charlotte Hornets	68	65	.511	7½	Calvin Griffith
Norfolk Tars	66	71	.482	11½	Ray White
Portsmouth Cubs	59	78	.431	18½	Ray Brubaker / Arthur McHenry
Winston-Salem Twins	48	85	.361	27½	Eddie Moore / Ray Brubaker

Playoffs: Rocky Mount 4 games, Asheville 2; Durham 4 games, Richmond 3
Finals: Durham 4 games, Rocky Mount 2

==== 1941 Piedmont League ====
Team standings	W	L	PCT	GB	Managers
Durham Bulls	84	53	.613	-	Bruno Betzel
Portsmouth Cubs	75	65	.536	10½	Don Curry
Greensboro Red Sox	71	66	.518	23½	Heinie Manush
Norfolk Tars	71	68	.511	24½	Eddie Sawyer
Richmond Colts	67	71	.486	28	Eddie Phillips
Charlotte Hornets	65	70	.481	28½	Calvin Griffith
Asheville Tourists	64	76	.457	31	Henry Cullop
Winston-Salem Twins	54	82	.397	39	Jake Atz

Playoffs: Greensboro 4 games, Portsmouth 0; Durham 4 games, Norfolk 1
Finals: Durham 4 games, Greensboro 0

==== 1942 Piedmont League ====
Team standings	W	L	PCT	GB	Managers
Greensboro Red Sox	78	53	.595	-	Heinie Manush
Portsmouth Cubs	80	55	.593	-	Tony Lazzeri
Richmond Colts	74	60	.552	5½	Ben Chapman
Charlotte Hornets	70	62	.530	8½	Harry Smythe
Durham Bulls	65	70	.481	15	Bruno Betzel
Asheville Tourists	61	77	.442	20½	Bill DeLancey
Norfolk Tars	57	79	.419	23½	Buzz Boyle
Winston-Salem Twins	52	81	.391	27	Jack Tighe /Al Unser

Playoffs: Greensboro 4 games, Charlotte 0; Portsmouth 4 games, Richmond 3
Finals: Greensboro 4 games, Portsmouth 2

==== 1943 Piedmont League ====
Team standings	W	L	PCT	GB	Managers
Portsmouth Cubs	90	40	.692	-	Milt Stock
Richmond Colts	72	57	.558	17½	Larry Kinzer
Norfolk Tars	66	63	.512	23½	Thomas Kain
Roanoke Red Sox	62	68	.477	28	Heinie Manush
Lynchburg Cardinals	54	74	.422	35	Ollie Vanek
Durham Bulls	44	86	.338	46	Bruno Betzel

Playoffs: Portsmouth 4 games, Roanoke 1; Norfolk 4 games, Richmond 0
Finals: Norfolk 4 games, Portsmouth 2

==== 1944 Piedmont League ====
Team standings	W	L	PCT	GB	Managers
Lynchburg Cardinals	80	60	.571	-	George Ferrell
Portsmouth Cubs	72	67	.518	7½	Bill Steinecke / Jimmie Foxx
Norfolk Tars	72	68	.514	8	Garland Braxton
Richmond Colts	67	72	.482	12½	Ben Chapman / Taylor Sanford
Roanoke Red Sox	66	73	.475	13½	Eddie Popowski
Newport News Dodgers	61	78	.439	18½	Jake Pitler

Playoffs: Portsmouth 4 games, Norfolk 3; Lynchburg 4 games, Richmond 2, one tie
Finals: Lynchburg 4 games, Portsmouth 3

==== 1945 Piedmont League ====
Team Standings	W	L	PCT	GB	Managers
Norfolk Tars	83	57	.593	-	Garland Braxton
Richmond Colts	76	60	.559	5	Frank Rodgers
Newport News Dodgers	69	69	.500	13	Jake Pitler
Portsmouth Cubs	67	69	.493	14	Ival Goodman
Roanoke Red Sox	67	71	.486	15	Eddie Popowski
Lynchburg Cardinals	52	88	.371	31	George Ferrell / Zip Payne

Playoffs: Portsmouth 4 games. Norfolk 3; Richmond 4 games, Newport News 0
Finals: Portsmouth 4 games, Richmond 0

==== 1946 Piedmont League ====
Team standings	W	L	PCT	GB	Managers
Roanoke Red Sox	89	51	.636	-	Eddie Popowski
Portsmouth Cubs	83	57	.593	6	Gene Hasson / Ace Parker
Newport News Dodgers	76	64	.543	13	John Fitzpatrick
Norfolk Tars	71	69	.507	18	Thomas Kain
Richmond Colts	60	80	.429	29	Ray Berres
Lynchburg Cardinals	41	99	.293	48	Wes Ferrell / Emmitt Mueller

Playoffs: Newport News 4 games, Portsmouth 0; Roanoke 4 games, Norfolk 2
Finals: Newport News 4 games, Roanoke 2, one tie.

==== 1947 Piedmont League ====
Team standings	W	L	PCT	GB	Managers
Roanoke Red Sox	90	49	.647	-	Pinky Higgins
Norfolk Tars	69	70	.496	21	Buddy Hassett
Portsmouth Cubs	69	71	.493	21½	Gene Hasson
Richmond Colts	68	71	.489	22	Bob Lotshaw
Lynchburg Cardinals	63	76	.453	27	Jack McLain / Vernon Mackie
Newport News Dodgers	59	81	.421	31½	John Fitzpatrick

Playoffs: Roanoke 4 games, Richmond 1; Norfolk 4 games, Portsmouth 0
Finals: Roanoke 4 games, Norfolk 3

==== 1948 Piedmont League ====
Team standings	W	L	PCT	GB	Managers
Lynchburg Cardinals	80	58	.580	-	Vernon Mackie
Newport News Dodgers	72	67	.518	8½	Roy Schalk
Portsmouth Cubs	71	69	.507	10	Ace Parker
Roanoke Red Sox	65	73	.471	15	Pinky Higgins
Norfolk Tars	65	75	.464	16	Earl Bolyard
Richmond Colts	64	75	.460	16½	Charles George

Playoffs: Lynchburg 4 games, Roanoke 3; Newport News 4 games, Portsmouth 3
Finals: Newport News 4 games, Lynchburg 0

==== 1949 Piedmont League ====
Team standings	W	L	PCT	GB	Managers
Lynchburg Cardinals	77	62	.554	-	Pug Griffin / Vernon Mackie
Portsmouth Cubs	74	66	.529	3½	Skeeter Scalzi
Richmond Colts	71	68	.511	6	Vince Smith
Roanoke Red Sox	71	69	.507	6½	Red Marion
Norfolk Tars	68	72	.486	9½	Earl Bolyard / Frank Novosel
Newport News Dodgers	58	82	.414	19½	Roy Schalk

Playoffs: Lynchburg 4 games, Roanoke 3; Portsmouth 4 games, Richmond 2
Finals: Lynchburg 4 games, Portsmouth 2

==== 1950 Piedmont League ====
Team standings	W	L	PCT	GB	Managers
Portsmouth Cubs	83	54	.606	-	Skeeter Scalzi
Roanoke Red Sox	81	58	.583	3	Red Marion
Lynchburg Cardinals	76	61	.555	7	Whitey Kurowski
Richmond Colts	63	76	.453	21	Vince Smith
Norfolk Tars	58	82	.414	26½	Frank Novosel
Newport News Dodgers	55	85	.393	29½	Al Campanis / Bud Methany

Playoffs: Portsmouth 4 games, Richmond 0; Roanoke 4 games, Lynchburg 1
Finals: Roanoke 4 games, Portsmouth 3

==== 1951 Piedmont League ====
Team standings	W	L	PCT	GB	Managers
Norfolk Tars	81	58	.583	-	Mayo Smith
Richmond Colts	77	63	.550	4½	Billy Herman / Roy Allen
Newport News Dodgers	75	66	.532	7	Clay Bryant
Portsmouth Cubs	74	67	.525	8	Reggie Otero
Lynchburg Cardinals	64	75	.460	17	Skeeter Scalzi
Roanoke Ro-Sox	49	91	.350	32½	Walter Millies

Playoffs: Norfolk 4 games, Portsmouth 1; Richmond 4 games, Newport News 2
Finals: Norfolk 4 games, Richmond 2

==== 1952 Piedmont League ====
Team standings	W	L	PCT	GB	Managers
Norfolk Tars	96	36	.727	-	Mayo Smith
Portsmouth Cubs	71	64	.526	26½	Reggie Otero
Richmond Colts	69	66	.511	28½	Tom O'Connell
Lynchburg Cardinals	64	66	.492	31	James Brown / Harold Olt
Roanoke Ro-Sox	59	74	.444	37½	Owen Scheetz
Newport News Dodgers	41	94	.304	56½	Ray Hathaway

Playoffs: Richmond 4 games, Norfolk 1; Portsmouth 4 games, Lynchburg 2
Finals: Richmond 4 games, Portsmouth 2

==== 1953 Piedmont League ====
Team standings	W	L	PCT	GB	Managers
Norfolk Tars	81	51	.614	-	Mickey Owen
Hagerstown Braves	78	53	.595	2½	Dutch Dorman / Jimmy Zinn / Billy Jurges
Newport News Dodgers	80	56	.588	3	Stan Wasiak
Portsmouth Merrimacs	72	63	.533	10½	Bob Ankrum
York White Roses	59	70	.457	20½	Mark Christman / Bill Enos / George Hausmann
Lynchburg Cardinals	55	77	.417	26	Richard Landis / John Sullivan
Richmond Colts	45	86	.344	35½	Charles Letcha
Roanoke Ro-Sox	39	53	.424	NA	Elmer Yoter

Roanoke withdrew July 24.
Playoffs: Norfolk 4 games, Portsmouth 1; Newport News 4 games, Hagerstown
Finals: Norfolk 4 games, Newport News 1.

==== 1954 Piedmont League ====
Team Standings	W	L	PCT	GB	Managers
Norfolk Tars	87	53	.621	-	Skeeter Scalzi
Newport News Dodgers	76	63	.547	10½	George Scherger
York White Roses	72	67	.518	14½	George Staller
Portsmouth Merrimacs	71	69	.507	16	Alex Monchak / Pepper Martin
Hagerstown Packets	66	74	.471	21	Paul Campbell / Zeke Bonura
Lynchburg Cardinals	63	77	.450	24	Roland LeBlanc
Lancaster Red Roses	62	78	.443	25	Kemp Wicker / Lena Blackburne / Buddy Walker
Colonial Heights-Petersburg Colts	62	78	.443	25	Johnny Vander Meer

Playoffs: Portsmouth 4 games, Norfolk 2; Newport News 4 games, York 0.
Finals: Newport News 4 games, Portsmouth 3

==== 1955 Piedmont League ====
Team standings	W	L	PCT	GB	Managers
Newport News Dodgers	77	52	.597	-	George Scherger
Lancaster Red Roses	72	54	.571	3½	Hank Biasatti
York White Roses	64	65	.496	13	George Staller
Portsmouth Merrimacs	64	66	.492	13½	Ken Guettler
Lynchburg Cardinals	64	67	.489	14	George Kissell
Hagerstown Packets	58	65	.472	16	Johnny Welaj
Sunbury Redlegs	47	80	.370	29	Virgil Stallcup / Dutch Dorman
Norfolk Tars	37	34	.521	NA	Al Evans / Alton Brown / Bill Herring

Norfolk withdrew July 14
Playoffs: Portsmouth 3 games, Newport News 1; Lancaster 3 games, York 1
Finals Lancaster 3 games, Portsmouth 2.

== Champions ==
The following teams were champions of the Piedmont League:

Year	Team
1920	Greensboro Patriots
1921	Greensboro Patriots
1922	Durham Bulls
1923	Danville Tobacconists
1924	Durham Bulls
1925	Durham Bulls
1926	Greensboro Patriots
1927	Salisbury-Spencer Colonials
1928	Winston-Salem Twins
1929	Greensboro Patriots
1930	Durham Bulls
1931	Charlotte Hornets
1932	Greensboro Patriots
1933	Greensboro Patriots
1934	Norfolk Tars
1935	Richmond Colts
1936	Norfolk Tars
1937	Norfolk Tars
1938	Charlotte Hornets
1939	Asheville Tourists
1940	Durham Bulls
1941	Durham Bulls
1942	Greensboro Red Sox
1943	Norfolk Tars
1944	Lynchburg Cardinals
1945	Portsmouth Cubs
1946	Newport News Dodgers
1947	Roanoke Red Sox
1948	Newport News Dodgers
1949	Lynchburg Cardinals
1950	Roanoke Red Sox
1951	Norfolk Tars
1952	Richmond Colts
1953	Norfolk Tars
1954	Newport News Dodgers
1955	Lancaster Red Roses

== Hall of Fame alumni ==
- Yogi Berra (1943, Norfolk)
- Whitey Ford (1948, Norfolk)
- Jimmie Foxx (1944, Portsmouth, MGR)
- Hank Greenberg (1930, Raleigh)
- Whitey Herzog (1951, Norfolk)
- Tony Lazzeri (1942, (Portsmouth, MGR)
- Buck Leonard (1953, Portsmouth)
- Heinie Manush (1940, Rocky Mount; 1941-1942, Greensboro; 1943, Roanoke)
- Johnny Mize (1930-1931, 1933, Greensboro)
- Phil Rizzuto (1938, Norfolk)
- Brooks Robinson (1955, York)
- Red Schoendienst (1943, Lynchburg)
- Duke Snider (1944-1945, Newport News)
- Billy Southworth (1935-1936, Asheville, MGR)
- Early Wynn (1938-1940, Charlotte)
