= Portsmouth Cubs =

- 1936–1952; (1935–1955); Portsmouth, Virginia

Minor league affiliations
- Class: Class B (1935–1955)
- League: Piedmont League (1935–1955)

Major league affiliations
- Team: Chicago Cubs (1935–1938); Philadelphia Phillies (1939–1940); Chicago Cubs (1941–1947)

Minor league titles
- League titles (1): 1945
- Conference titles (3): 1942; 1943; 1950
- Wild card berths (14): 1937; 1938; 1941; 1944; 1945; 1946; 1947; 1948; 1949; 1951; 1952; 1953; 1954; 1955

Team data
- Name: Portsmouth Truckers (1935); Portsmouth Cubs (1936–1952); Portsmouth Merrimacs (1953–1955)
- Ballpark: Sewanee Stadium (1935–1940); Frank Lawerence Stadium (1941–1955)

The Portsmouth Cubs were a minor league baseball team based in Portsmouth, Virginia. From 1935 to 1955, Portsmouth teams played exclusively as members of the Class B level Piedmont League, which was one of few minor leagues that continued play during World War II. Portsmouth qualified for the Piedmont League playoffs 17 times in 21 seasons, capturing the 1945 league championship, winning league pennants in 1942, 1943 and 1950 while advancing to the league Finals on ten separate occasions. For three seasons, the team became known as the Portsmouth "Merrimacs," beginning in 1953.

The Portsmouth Cubs played as a minor league affiliate of the Chicago Cubs from 1935 to 1938 and the Philadelphia Phillies in 1939 and 1940, before a second stint with the Chicago Cubs from 1941 to 1947.

Portsmouth hosted minor league games at two different ballparks in the era. The team played at Sewanee Stadium from 1935 to 1940, before moving full time to City Park / Frank Lawrence Stadium in 1941.

Baseball Hall of Fame member Buck Leonard played for Portsmouth in 1953 in his final professional season at age 45, hitting .333 for Portsmouth. Baseball Hall of Fame members Tony Lazzeri (1942) and Jimmie Foxx (1944) managed the Portsmouth Cubs, both leading their teams to the league Finals.

== History ==
Portsmouth had an early history of semi-professional baseball, hosting the Piedmont Manufacturing Baseball Team in a textile league as early as 1889. Portsmouth first hosted minor league baseball in 1895, when the Portsmouth Truckers played the season as members of the Class B level Virginia State League. In 1928, the Portsmouth Truckers ended a 16-season tenure as members of the Virginia League and immediately preceded the Piedmont League membership teams.

=== 1935 Piedmont League / Portsmouth Truckers ===
After the Virginia League folded following the 1928 season, Portsmouth, Virginia next hosted minor league baseball play in 1935, The Portsmouth minor league franchise was reformed after a six-season absence and the Truckers became members of the six–team Class B level Piedmont League. (Class B was the equivalent of today's Class AA level league). The Asheville Tourists, Charlotte Hornets, Norfolk Tars, Richmond Colts and Wilmington Pirates teams joined with the Portsmouth "Truckers" in beginning league play on April 25, 1935. The new Portsmouth franchise replaced the Greensboro Patriots in the Piedmont League.

Founded in 1920, the Piedmont League was named for the region, as the league member teams were located in the Piedmont plateau and Piedmont Triad regions in the eastern United States.

The new Portsmouth franchise was owned by local Portsmouth businessman Frank Lawerence. Lawrence first began his baseball administrative career when he became the owner of the 1913 Portsmouth Truckers. Lawerence owned each of the subsequent Portsmouth minor league teams through their tenure of Piedmont League play, ending in 1955.

The Truckers played the 1935 season as a minor league affiliate of the Chicago Cubs, beginning a lengthy partnership between Chicago and Portsmouth. Portsmouth hosted home games at Sewanee Stadium, which would remain as their primary home ballpark from 1935 thorough the 1941 season. In their first season of play in the Piedmont League, Portsmouth ended the season with a record of 67–72. The Truckers ended the regular season in fifth place, playing under manager Pip Koehler and finishing 9.0 games behind the first place Asheville Tourists in the final overall standings. Portsmouth did not qualify for the Piedmont League final playoff, as the league played a split season schedule in 1935. Asheville won the first half pennant, and third place Richmond won the second half pennant. Richmond then defeated Asheville in the final.

=== 1936 to 1938 Piedmont League: Portsmouth Cubs ===
In 1936, Portsmouth continued play as a Chicago Cubs affiliate in the six-team Class B level Piedmont League and became known by a new nickname. The Portsmouth "Cubs" ended the season in fifth place, as the league abandoned the split season schedule and adopted a four-team playoff following the completion of the regular season. Portsmouth became known as the "Cubs" and were known by the Cubs nickname for the next 17 seasons. With a final record of 66–77, Portsmouth was managed by returning manager Pip Koehler and finished 27.0 games behind the first place Norfolk Tars in the final regular season standings. With their fifth-place finish, Portsmouth did not qualify for the four-team playoffs, which was won by Norfolk.

The Piedmont league expanded to become an eight-team league in the 1937 season, adding the Rocky Mount Red Sox and Winston-Salem Twins teams to the Class B level league. Portsmouth qualified for the four-team Piedmont League playoffs for the first time. The Cubs ended the regular season in third place after finishing with a record of 75–62, while playing the under manager Elmer Yoter. Portsmouth finished 13.0 games behind the first place Asheville Tourists. In the playoffs, Portsmouth defeated Asheville 3 games to 2 in the first round. In the final, Portsmouth lost to the Norfolk Tars, who swept Portsmouth in three games in the best of five game series and won their second consecutive league title. Pitcher Harry Brecheen of Portsmouth led the Piedmont League with 185 strikeouts.

After having played with the Philadelphia Athletics in 1936 following his graduation from Washington College, outfielder Bill Nicholson played for Portsmouth in 1937. At age 22, Nicholson batted .310 with 20 home runs and 92 RBI and a .909 OPS in 121 games for Portsmouth after having played with Philadelphia during spring training. Nicholson became a five-time Major League All-Star after he then spent the 1937 and 1938 seasons in the minor leagues before joining the Chicago Cubs in 1939. Nicholson led the Chicago Cubs in home runs for eight consecutive seasons. In his 16-year major league career, Nicholson compiled a lifetime .268 batting average with 235 home runs and 948 RBI, while playing in 1,677 career major league games.

Infielder Eddie Stanky first played for the Portsmouth Cubs in 1937 and continued with the team through 1939. Stanky was a three-time All-Star in the major leagues as a player, playing 11 seasons and retiring with a lifetime .410 OBP in the major leagues. Following his major league playing career, Stanky managed the St. Louis Cardinals (1952–1955), Chicago White Sox (1966–1968) and Texas Rangers (1977).

Ace Parker was a Portsmouth, Virginia native who won 16 varsity letters at Woodrow Wilson High School participating in football, basketball, baseball, track and field and golf. Parker played his first season of professional baseball for his native Portsmouth team in 1937, at age 25. Parker would later become a player/manager for Portsmouth. Playing third base, the multi-sport athlete batted .243, hitting 4 home runs in 21 games for the Cubs. Parked made his major league debut with the Philadelphia Athletics in 1937, following his short stint with Portsmouth. Parker played in 38 games for the Athletics after his stint with Portsmouth. Following the baseball season, Parker played his first season in the National Football League in the fall of 1937. A future hall of fame football player, Parker was a quarterback, halfback and defensive back in football, He had been selected by the football Brooklyn Dodgers with the 13th pick in the 1937 NFL draft after having played collegiately at Duke.

The 1938 Piedmont League continued play as a Class B eight-team league and Portsmouth qualified for the playoffs for the second consecutive season. Portsmouth ended the regular season in fourth place with a 69–67 record. Playing the season under manager Dick Luckey, the Cubs finished 15.0 games behind the first place Norfolk Tars in the final regular season standings. Portsmouth lost in first round of the four-team playoffs to the eventual champion Charlotte Hornets 3 games to 2.

Pitcher Bud Tinning played briefly for Portsmouth in 1938 at age 32. Tinning had injured his arm in 1935 while pitching for the St. Louis Cardinals and was attempting a comeback from the injury. He played his final professional season in 1939.

=== 1939 & 1940 Piedmont League: Philadelphia Phillies affiliate ===
The Portsmouth Cubs continued play in the eight-team Piedmont League in 1939, as the franchise became a minor league affiliate of the Philadelphia Phillies. Despite the affiliate change, the Portsmouth team continued to be known as the "Cubs." Portsmouth ended the 1939 season with a final record of 66–71. The Cubs ended the regular season in a fifth-place tie with the Norfolk Tars, who had an identical record. Playing the season under manager Jim Keesey, the Cubs finished 19.5 games behind the first place Asheville Tourists. With their fifth-place finish, Portsmouth did not qualify for the four-team playoffs won by Asheville. Portsmouth's Floyd Yount won the Piedmont League batting title, hitting .350 while also leading the league with 175 total hits. Portsmouth Pitcher Ray Clark won 20 games to lead the Piedmont League.

After playing the 1938 season, with Philadelphia Athletics, Ace Parker returned to Portsmouth for the 1938 season. Playing in 116 games, Parker batted .303 with an .889 OPS hitting 16 home runs for the Cubs. In the fall of 1938, Parker also led the National Football League with 865 passing yards while playing for the Brooklyn Dodgers (NFL) team, finishing ahead of Sammy Baugh.

Portsmouth did not qualify for the 1940 Piedmont League playoffs after the conclusion of the eight-team league's regular season. Continuing as a Philadelphia Phillies minor league affiliate, Portsmouth ended the season in seventh place. The Cubs finished with a final record of 59–78, while playing the season under managers Ray Brubaker (19–26) and Art McHenry (40–52). Ending the regular season 18.5 games behind the first place Richmond Colts, Portsmouth did not qualify for the four-team playoffs that were won by the fourth place Durham Bulls. Pitcher Max Wilson of Portsmouth won 20 games, to lead the Piedmont League. Following his season with Portsmouth, Wilson made his major league debut with the Philadelphia Phillies near the end of the 1940 major league season.

=== 1941 to 1947 Piedmont League World War II play: Chicago Cubs affiliate ===
In 1941, Portsmouth continued Piedmont League play and returned to being a minor league affiliate of the Chicago Cubs. The Piedmont League continued play during the 1941 season as an eight-team Class B level league and Portsmouth finished as the league runner-up in the regular season. 75–65 second place manager Don Curry, 10.5 games behind the first place Durham Bulls. In the four-team playoffs, Portsmouth lost in first round to the Greensboro Red Sox 4 games to 2, as the Durham Bulls defeated Greensboro in the final to win the league championship. One season after winning 20 games, left-hander Max Wilson compiled a 19–9 record with a 2.39 ERA on the season for Portsmouth. Following the 1941 season Wilson's professional baseball career was interrupted by his service with the U.S. Navy during World War II, from 1941 to 1945.

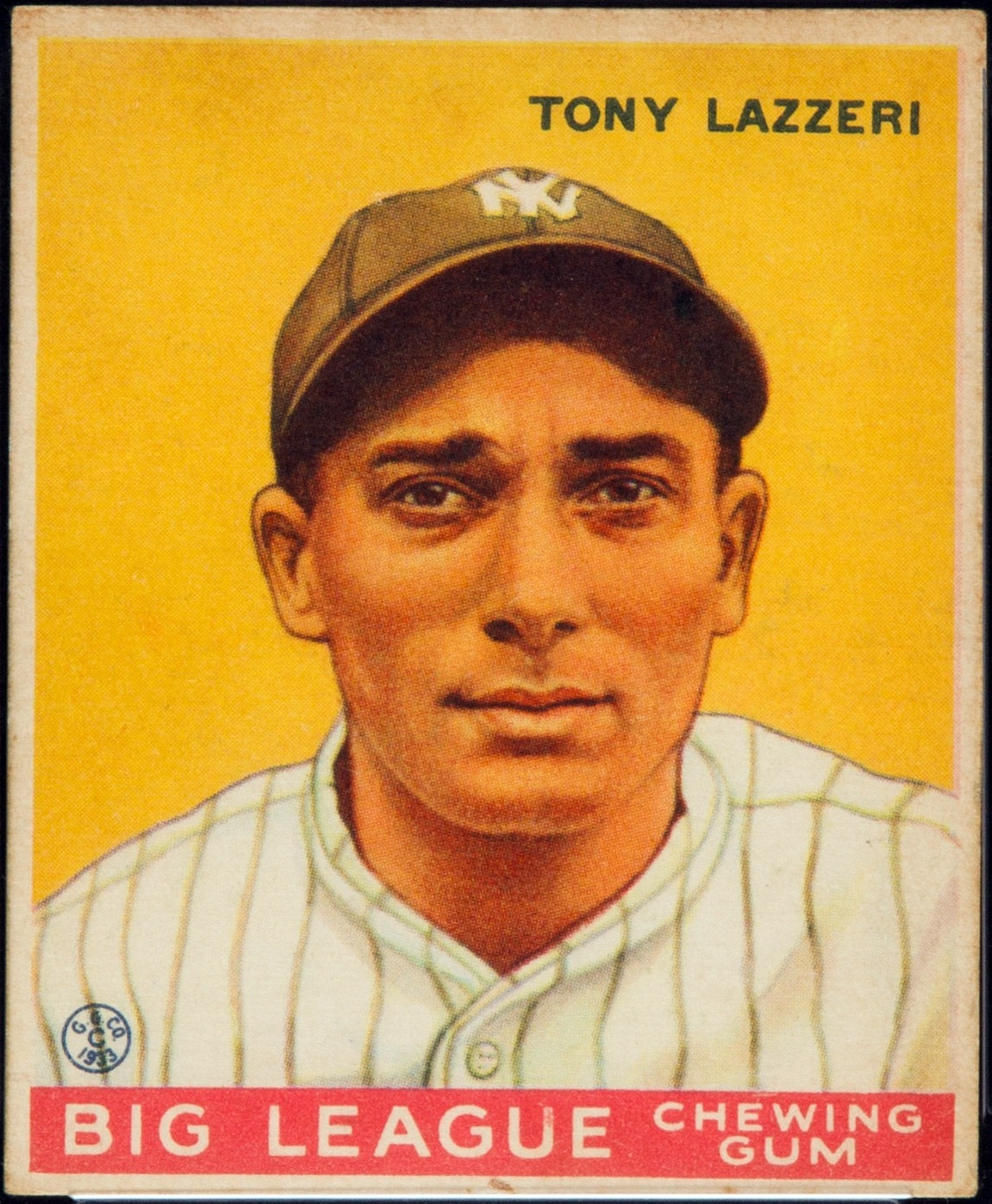
(1933) Baseball Hall of Fame member Tony Lazzeri, New York Yankees. Goudey baseball card. Lazzeri was the player/manager for Portsmouth in 1942, leading the team to the league pennant.

At age 38, Baseball Hall of Fame member Tony Lazzeri became Portsmouth's player/manager in 1942. Lazzeri Came to Portsmouth after playing the 1941 season for the San Francisco Seals team of the Pacific Coast League. Lazzeri was working at a Defense Plant in San Francisco at the time of his hiring by Portsmouth on December 28, 1941. Lazzeri was the second baseman for the New York Yankees from 1926 to 1937, playing alongside Babe Ruth, Lou Gehrig, Lefty Gomez and Joe DiMaggio and winning five world series championships, while accumulating seven seasons with over 100 RBI. Lazzeri died in August 1946 at the age of 42 of a heart attack. He was elected to the Baseball Hall of Fame in 1991.

The 1942 minor league season was affected by the onset of World War II, but the Piedmont League continued play and the Portsmouth Cubs won the league pennant. The eight-team Piedmont League was one of 31 leagues to begin the 1942 season, with five leagues folding before the conclusion of the season. Portsmouth ended the season in a virtual tie for first place after their record of 80–55 (.593) tied for first place with the Greensboro Red Sox, who had a 78–53 record (.595). The two teams finished 5.5 games ahead of the third place Richmond Colts after their virtual tie, The Portsmouth Cubs played the season Baseball Hall of Fame member Tony Lazzeri. In the first round of the four-team playoffs, Portsmouth defeated the Richmond Colts in seven games. The Cubs then lost in the league final 4 games to 2 to Greensboro. Pitcher Woody Johnson of Portsmouth led the Piedmont League with 167 strikeouts. Player/manager Tony Lazzeri hit .242 for Portsmouth in 310 at bats over 98 games.

The 1943 Portsmouth Cubs won their second consecutive Piedmont League pennant, finishing first in the final regular season standings. Playing during World War II, the Piedmont League was one of just nine minor leagues that played the 1943 season and only 62 cities hosted teams. While continuing play, the Piedmont League reduced teams in 1943 to become a six-team league. The Durham Bulls, Lynchburg Cardinals, Norfolk Tars, Richmond Colts and Roanoke Red Sox teams partnered with Portsmouth to continue league play after the Asheville Tourists and Winston-Salem Twins teams folded. Ending the season with a final record of 90–40 the Cubs finished in first place. Playing the season under manager Milt Stock, Portsmouth finished 17.5 games ahead of the second place Richmond Colts in the final standings. In the first round of the playoffs, Portsmouth defeated the Roanoke Red Sox, managed by Baseball Hall of Fame member Heinie Manush, 4 games to 1. Portsmouth advanced in the playoffs and lost the championship series to the Norfolk Tars 4 games to 2 in the final. Portsmouth pitcher Irv Stein had 24 wins, to lead the Piedmont League. The right-handed Stein also had a 1.85 ERA on the season, pitching 260 innings in 31 games for Portsmouth at age 32.

Portsmouth Cubs team owner Frank Lawerence was named as the "Minor League Executive of the Year" by The Sporting News in 1943. On June 16, 1944, a "Frank Lawrence Night" was held at the ballpark in Portsmouth. Virginia Governor Colgate Darden was in attendance and presented Frank Lawrence with a scroll of the 1943 Sporting News award.

Catcher Bill Steinecke was named manager of the Portsmouth Cubs to begin the 1944 season. Steineke had first joined Portsmouth as a player in 1939 and remained with the team through the 1944 season. Steineke played in the major leagues with the 1931 Pittsburgh Pirates after beginning his profession career in 1925 with the Rock Island Islanders of the Class D level Mississippi Valley League. Steinecke's first managerial position was in 1937, where he was the player/manager for the Jacksonville Tars of the Class B level Sally League. Steineke continued to serve as a minor league manager through 1964, his 40th season in professional baseball. In 1958, Steineke was the manager of the McCook Braves of the Nebraska State League, and was a key character in Pat Jordan's memoir, A False Spring. Steineke continued to serve as a baseball scout until his death in 1986.

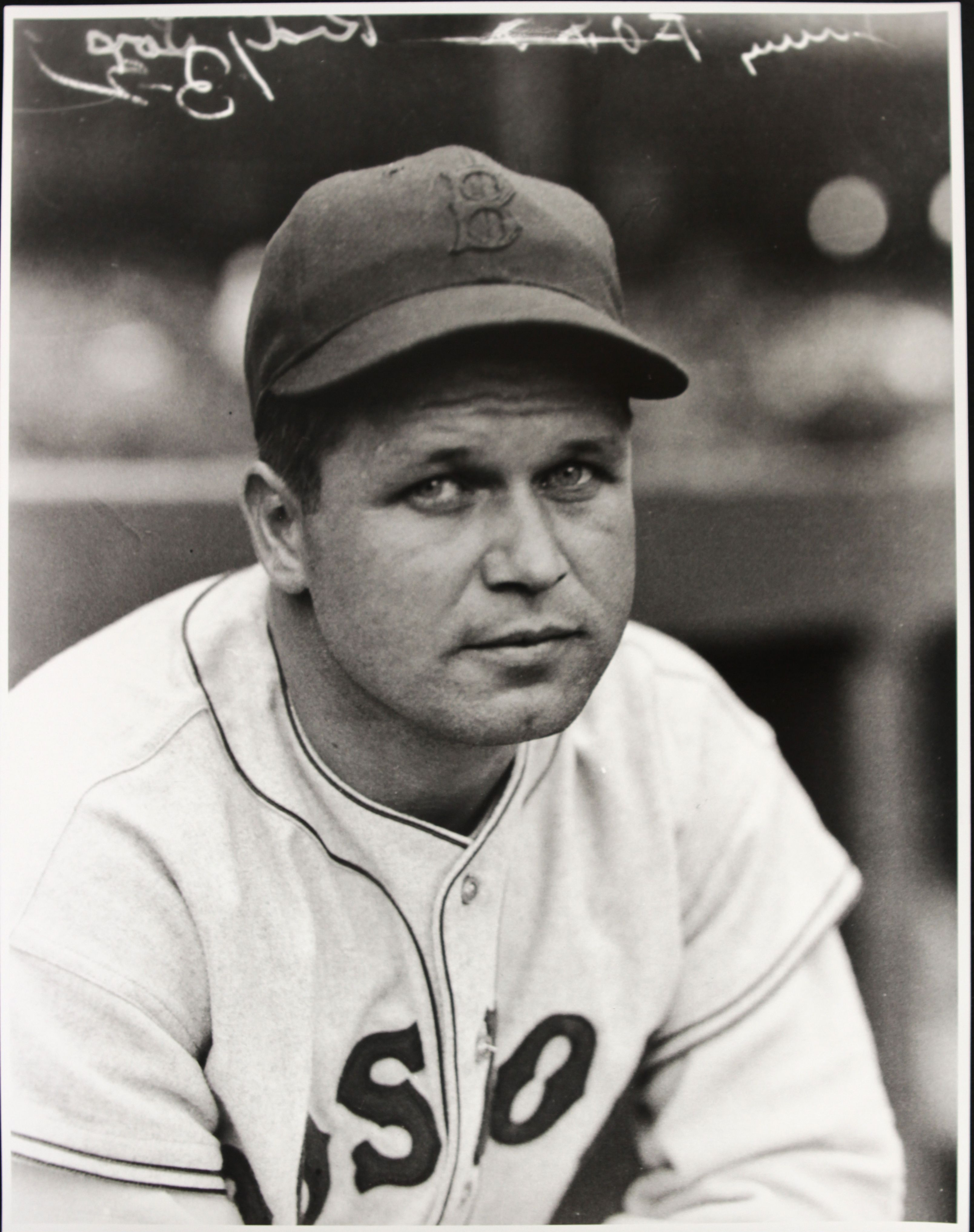
(1937) Baseball Hall of Fame member Jimmy Foxx, Boston Red Sox. Foxx managed the 1944 Portsmouth Cubs for the end of the season, leading the team to the playoff finals. Foxx also pitched a complete game victory for the team in an emergency situation.

With another future hall of fame member joining the team their manager during the season, Portsmouth advanced to the Piedmont League finals in 1944. The Piedmont League continued minor league play as a six-team League in the 1944 season. as the league was one of 10 minor leagues to play in 1944 due to the ongoing World War II. Ending the season in second place with a 72–67 record, Portsmouth began the season playing under manager Bill Steinecke. Led by Steinke, the team had compiled a record of 64–56 when he was replaced as manager by Baseball Hall of Fame member Jimmie Foxx. Foxx finished the season managing Portsmouth after being assigned to the team by their major league affiliate Chicago Cubs. Portsmouth ended the regular season 7.5 games behind the first place Lynchburg Cardinals. In the first round of the four-team playoffs, Portsmouth defeated the Norfolk Tars in seven games to advance. Portsmouth again lost in the league finals, falling to Lynchburg in seven games. Pitcher Natilla Jiménez of Portsmouth led the Piedmont league with both a 1.51 ERA and a .750 win percentage with his 15–5 record.

Jimmie Foxx joined Portsmouth as the manager during the 1944 season, after having been away from professional baseball in the 1943 season. In 1944, at age 36, Foxx had volunteered for military service during World War II, but he was rejected due to a sinus condition. Foxx then returned to play a handful of games as a player-coach for the Chicago Cubs (he had 20 at bats) before becoming the interim manager of Portsmouth to finish out the season. He was offered the position by the Cubs to manage their affiliate team. Foxx made an appearance as a pitcher for Portsmouth, throwing a complete game six-hitter with eight strikeouts and earning the win. Following his stint with Portsmouth, Foxx returned to his major league playing career in 1945 and played his final season for the Philadelphia Phillies. Foxx retired following the 1945 season with a .325 lifetime batting average, 2,646 hits, and 534 home runs and 1,922 RBI.

Portsmouth won the 1945 Piedmont League championship in the six-team league. The 1945 minor league baseball a season saw total 12 minor league circuits form for the season, with World War II continuing., In their championship season, the Portsmouth Cubs qualified for the four-team playoffs by ending the Piedmont League season in fourth place with a losing record. With a final record of 67–69, the Cubs played the season under manager Ival Goodman and finished 14.0 gamed behind the first place Norfolk Tars. In the first round of the four-team playoffs, the Cubs began their championship run by defeating Norfolk 4 games to 3 in the best of seven game series. In the final, Portsmouth won the Piedmont League championship by sweeping the Richmond Colts 4 games to 0. Elwood Grantham of Portsmouth hit 12 home runs and was the co-leader for home runs in the Piedmont League.

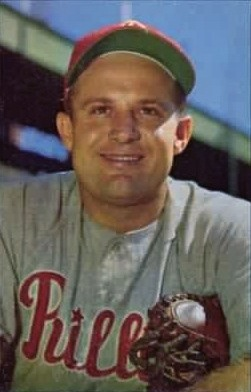
(1953) Smoky Burgess, Philadelphia Athletics. Burgess played for the 1945 Portsmouth Cubs until May 1945, when he enlisted for military service during World War II.

In his second professional season at age 18, Smoky Burgess played for Portsmouth in 1945, batting .344 while playing in 12 games. His time with Portsmouth was interrupted by military service, as Burgess enlisted in the U.S. Army at Fort Bragg at the end of May 1945 and missed the remainder of the 1945 season. While serving in the U.S. Army during World War II, Burgess was injured in a military automobile incident in Germany, that injured his throwing shoulder. After the injury, Burgess returned to baseball with the Fayetteville Cubs and won the 1947 Tri-State League batting championship with a .387 batting average. Burgess then led the Southern Association with a .386 average in 1948. A member of the Cincinnati Reds Hall of Fame and a 9-time major league All-Star, Burgess made his major league debut with the Chicago Cubs in 1949 and began an 18-season major league career, playing through 1967.

In the 1946 season, minor league baseball saw 46 leagues form following the conclusion of World War II. With the Piedmont League continuing play as a six-team Class B level league, the Portsmouth Cubs team finished in second place, while remaining as a Chicago Cubs minor league affiliate. Portsmouth ended the regular season with a 83–57 record, managed during the season by both Gene Hasson and Ace Parker. The Cubs finished 6.0 games behind the first place Roanoke Red Sox in the regular season standings and qualified for the four-team playoffs. The Cubs lost in first round of the playoffs, being swept by the eventual champion Newport News Dodgers team in four games in the best of seven series. Portsmouth player/manager Ace Parker won the Piedmont League batting title, hitting .331 on the season. Portsmouth's Paul Varner scored 133 runs to lead the league in that category. Following his baseball season with Portsmouth, Ace Parker played his final professional football season, playing quarterback for the football New York Yankees.

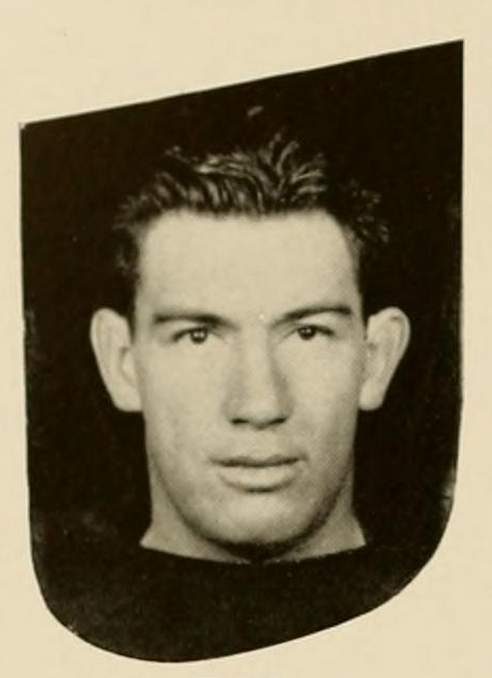
(1936) Ace Parker. A Portsmouth native, Parker was a player/manager for the Cubs in 1946 and 1948, while also playing in the National Football League. Parked played for Portsmouth in 6 different seasons beginning in 1937 and won the 1946 Piedmont League batting title. Parker was inducted into the Pro Football Hall of Fame in 1972.

Player/manager Ace Parker was a native of Portsmouth and was a two-sport athlete, also playing as a football quarterback. Parker played his final National Football League season with the New York Yankees in the fall of 1946 following his season with Portsmouth. Parker was named the Most Valuable Player of the NFL in 1940 and was inducted into the Pro Football Hall of Fame in 1972. Parker died in Portsmouth in 2013, at the age of 101.

The 1947 season was the final season that Portsmouth played as a Chicago Cubs minor league affiliate and the Cubs team drew 154,026 for the season. Portsmouth ended the Piedmont League regular season in third place in the six-team Class B level league. The Cubs had a 69–71 regular season record, playing under returning manager Gene Hasson, and finished 21.5 games behind the first place Roanoke Red Sox, who won their second consecutive league pennant. The Cubs lost in first round of the playoffs, being swept in four games by the Norfolk Tars. Roanoke defeated Norfolk in the final to win the league championship. Vern Shetler of Portsmouth hit 20 home runs to lead the Piedmont League. Shetler hit .291 with 116 RBI and a .870 OPS on the 1947 season, playing at age 28.

=== 1948 to 1952 Piedmont League: Portsmouth Cubs ===
The Piedmont League continued play in the 1948 season as six team league. Portsmouth had no minor league affiliate for the first time in the Class B level Piedmont League play and the franchise would play as an unaffiliated team through 1955. The Cubs ended the season with a final record of 71–69, finishing in third place as Ace Parker returned as Portsmouth/s player/manager in his third consecutive season with the team. Portsmouth ended the season 10.0 games behind the first place Lynchburg Cardinals while drawing 108,591 fans on the season. The Cubs were defeated in first round of the four-team playoffs, losing to the eventual champion Newport News Dodgers in seven games. Pitcher Lou Ciola of Portsmouth led the Piedmont League with a 1.69 ERA, while future baseball Hall of Fame member Whitey Ford of Norfolk led the league with 171 strikeouts. Following his season as Portsmouth's manager, in 1949 Parker became the player-manager of the Durham Bulls of the Class B level Carolina League. Parker would become the baseball coach and his alma mater, Duke University, leading the 1953 Duke Blue Devils baseball team to the 1953 College World Series.

The Portsmouth Cubs continued play in the 1949 Piedmont League, with the league remaining as a Class B level, six team league. Portsmouth ended the regular season as the runner-up in the final standings. The Cubs ended the season with a record of 74–66 to earn their second-place finish, playing the season under manager Skeeter Scalzi. Portsmouth finished 3.5 games behind the first place Lynchburg Cardinals, who won their second consecutive pennant. In the first round of the four-team playoffs, Portsmouth defeated the Richmond Colts 4 games to 2 and advanced to the league finals for the sixth time in Piedmont League play. In the final series, Lynchburg defeated the Cubs 4 games to 2. to win the league championship. Pitcher Angelo Nardello of Portsmouth won 20 games to lead the Piedmont League.

Skeeter Scalzi became the Portsmouth Cubs player/manager in 1949 and remained in that role in returning to the team in 1950. After a brief major league playing career, Scalzi played 17 seasons of minor league baseball and served as a minor league manager for 12 seasons. Scalzi had been a player/manager for the Hopkinsville Hoppers in 1947 in his first manager role, before joining the 1948 Fayetteville Cubs, a Chicago Cubs minor league affiliate, for his second player/manager dual position at age 35. With Scalzi as player/manager, the Fayetteville Cubs captured the 1948 Tri-State League championship.

With Scalzi returning as manager, the Portsmouth Cubs won the 1950 Piedmont league pennant. Portsmouth drew 106,858 fans in their first-place season. Portsmouth ended the season in first place in the six-team league, ending with an 83–54 record, while finishing 3.0 games ahead of the second place Roanoke Red Sox and 29.5 games ahead of the sixth place Newport News Dodgers in the final regular season standings. The Cubs played the season under returning manager Skeeter Scalzi. In the first round of the playoffs, the Cubs swept the Richmond Colts in four games. Advancing to the league finals for the seventh time, Portsmouth was defeated by Roanoke 4 games to 3 in the best of seven game series. Portsmouth pitcher Earl Mossor won 20 games to lead the Piedmont League, while his teammate Duke Markell led the league with 219 strikeouts. Red Treadway of Portsmouth had 177 total hits, most in the Piedmont League. In 1951, Treadway became the player/manager of the Suffolk Goobers in the Virginia League. Treadway came to Portsmouth during the 1949 season after serving as the player/manager of the 1949 Visalia Cubs of the California League, a Chicago Cubs affiliate team before being fired on June 25, 1949. Treadway hit .324 with a .387 OBP for Portsmouth in 1950.

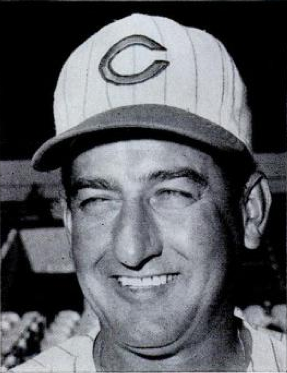
(1963) Reggie Otero, third base coach Cincinnati Reds. Otero played for Portsmouth from 1948 to 1952 and served as player/manager in 1951 and 1952.

Portsmouth qualified for the playoffs in the 1951 Piedmont League season, as the unaffiliated Cubs continued play in the six-team Class B level league. Portsmouth was led player/manager Reggie Otero and ended the season with a record of 74–67 to finish in fourth place, ending the season 8.0 games behind the first place Norfolk Tars in the final regular season standings. The Cubs lost in first round of the four-team playoffs, defeated by eventual champion Norfolk 4 games to 1. Portsmouth's Ken Guettler hit 30 home runs to lead the Piedmont League, while also leading the league with 116 RBI and 114 runs scored. Pitcher James Barnhardt of Portsmouth led the league with a 2.53 ERA.

Portsmouth player/manager Reggie Otero had played in the major leagues with the 1945 Chicago Cubs. He played with the Los Angeles Angels of the Pacific Coast League in 1946 and 1947 seasons. In 1948 Otero joined the Portsmouth Cubs, where he would play for the next five years, while serving as player/manager in 1951 and 1952. In his five seasons with Portsmouth, Otero hit over .300 four times with a high of .353 and had 4 home runs and 312 RBI.

With a memorable season from Ken Guettler in 1952, the Portsmouth Cubs ended the Piedmont League regular season as the league runner up and advanced to the finals. The 1952 season was the final season the team was known as the "Cubs." Portsmouth compiled a record of 71–6, finishing in second place under returning player/manager Reggie Otero. Portsmouth finished 26.5 games behind the first place Norfolk Tars, who ended the regular season with a record of 96–36 and finished 56.5 games ahead of the sixth place Newport News Dodgers. In the first round of the four-team Piedmont League playoffs, Portsmouth defeated the Lynchburg Cardinals to advance. Advancing to the Piedmont League playoff finals for the eighth time the Cubs were defeated by the Richmond Colts 4 game to 2 after Richmond had pulled an upset over Norfolk in their first round series. Portsmouth's Ken Guettler won the Triple Crown in the Piedmont league. Guettler hit 28 home runs with 104 RBI to lead the Piedmont League in both categories, while also winning the league batting title, hitting .334 on the season.

Following the 1952 season, manager Reggie Otero played for the 1953 Springfield Cubs (International League) and hit .171 for Springfield before retiring as a player. Ortero then managed the Havana Sugar Kings from 1954 to 1956. Managing in the Venezuelan League, Otero he led the Industriales de Valencia to three league consecutive championships from 1956 to 1959 and then led the Leones del Caracas to four titles (1962, 1964, 1967 and 1968). His seven championships are the most in the league's history. Otero served as a coach for the Cincinnati Reds from 1959 to 1965 and the Cleveland Indians in 1966. In 1967, Otero became a special assignment scout, working for Cleveland Indians and the Los Angeles Dodgers into the 1980s.

=== 1953 to 1955 Piedmont League: Portsmouth Merrimacs ===
The 1953 Piedmont League continued play as an eight-team Class B level league, adding the Hagerstown Braves and York White Roses franchises to the league. The newly named Portsmouth "Merrimacs" continued their league membership, along with the returning members of the eight-team league, the Lynchburg Cardinals, Newport News Dodgers, Norfolk Tars, Richmond Colts and Roanoke Ro-Sox.

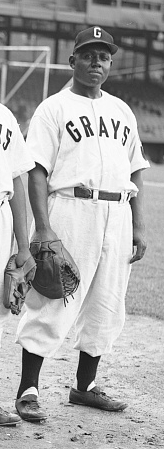
(1947) Baseball Hall of Fame member Buck Leonard, Homestead Grays. At age 45, Leonard played for the 1953 Portsmouth Merrimacs, hitting .333 in 10 games.

Portsmouth continued play at Frank Lawrence Stadium in the 1953 season. The Merrimacs ended the regular season with a record of 72–63 to finish the season in fourth place, managed by Bob Ankrum. Portsmouth ended the regular season 10.5 games behind the first place Norfolk Tars and qualified for the four-team playoffs. Portsmouth lost to eventual champion Norfolk in first round of the Piedmont League playoffs 4 game to 1. Portsmouth's Ken Guettler led the Piedmont League in home runs for the third consecutive season, hitting 30 home runs for the season.

Baseball Hall of Fame member Buck Leonard played for the 1953 Portsmouth Merrimacs in his final professional season after a career in the Negro Leagues. Playing for the Merrimacs at age 45, Leonard batted .333 in 10 games and 46 at bats for Portsmouth. Leonard was at his home in Rocky Mount, North Carolina, when he was recruited and signed with Portsmouth during the Piedmont League season. In 1955, at age forty-eight, Leonard hit 13 home runs while hitting .312 in 62 games with the Durango team of the Central Mexican League in his final season of professional baseball.

Charlie Peete played for Portsmouth in 1953 and 1954. Pete was drafted by the United States Army in 1952 during the Korean War and served in Asia mainly with the Special Services Division. Peete was honorably discharged in 1953 after 15 months of service. Following his military discharge, Peete signed with the Portsmouth Merrimacs, becoming the first African-American to play in the Piedmont League following the 1946 breaking of the baseball color line. With the 1953 Merrimacs, Peete batted .275 in 125 games for Portsmouth. In 1954, Peete batted .311 with 17 home runs and was named to the Piedmont League All-Star team. Portsmouth owner Frank Lawrence spoke highly of Peete in a Sporting News profile of Peete in March 1955, predicting that Peete would have a successful major league career. In 1956, Peete was projected as the centerfielder for the St. Louis Cardinals. Peete decided to play winter baseball in preparation, and was traveling from playing in Cuba to join the Valencia, Venezuela based Navegantes del Magallanes team in the Venezuelan Professional Baseball League on November 27, 1956. Peete, his wife, and their three small children were on board Linea Aeropostal Flight 253 when the plane crashed into Avila Mountain near Caracas, Venezuela, leaving no survivors of the 25 people on board the flight. Peete was 27 years old.

in the 1954 season, the eight-team Class B level Piedmont League was one of 36 minor league circuits to begin the season. The 1954 Portsmouth Merrimacs qualified for the playoffs. The Merrimacs ended the regular season in fourth place, finishing with a 71–69 record, playing the seasons under managers Alex Monchak (50–47) and Pepper Martin (21–22). Led by Martin at the end of the season, Portsmouth finished 16.0 games behind the first place Norfolk Tars, who won their fourth consecutive Piedmont League pennant. In the first round of the playoffs, the Merrimacs upset pennant winning Norfolk, winning the series 4 games to 2. Portsmouth then lost in the Piedmont League finals in their ninth finals appearance. The Newport News Dodgers defeated the Merrimacs 4 games to 3 in the best of seven game series to win the league championship. Portsmouth's Charles Peete compiled 170 total hits for the season, leading the Piedmont League. Portsmouth drew 44,506 fans on the season, as Norfolk was the only league team to draw over 100,000 fans with 129,918.

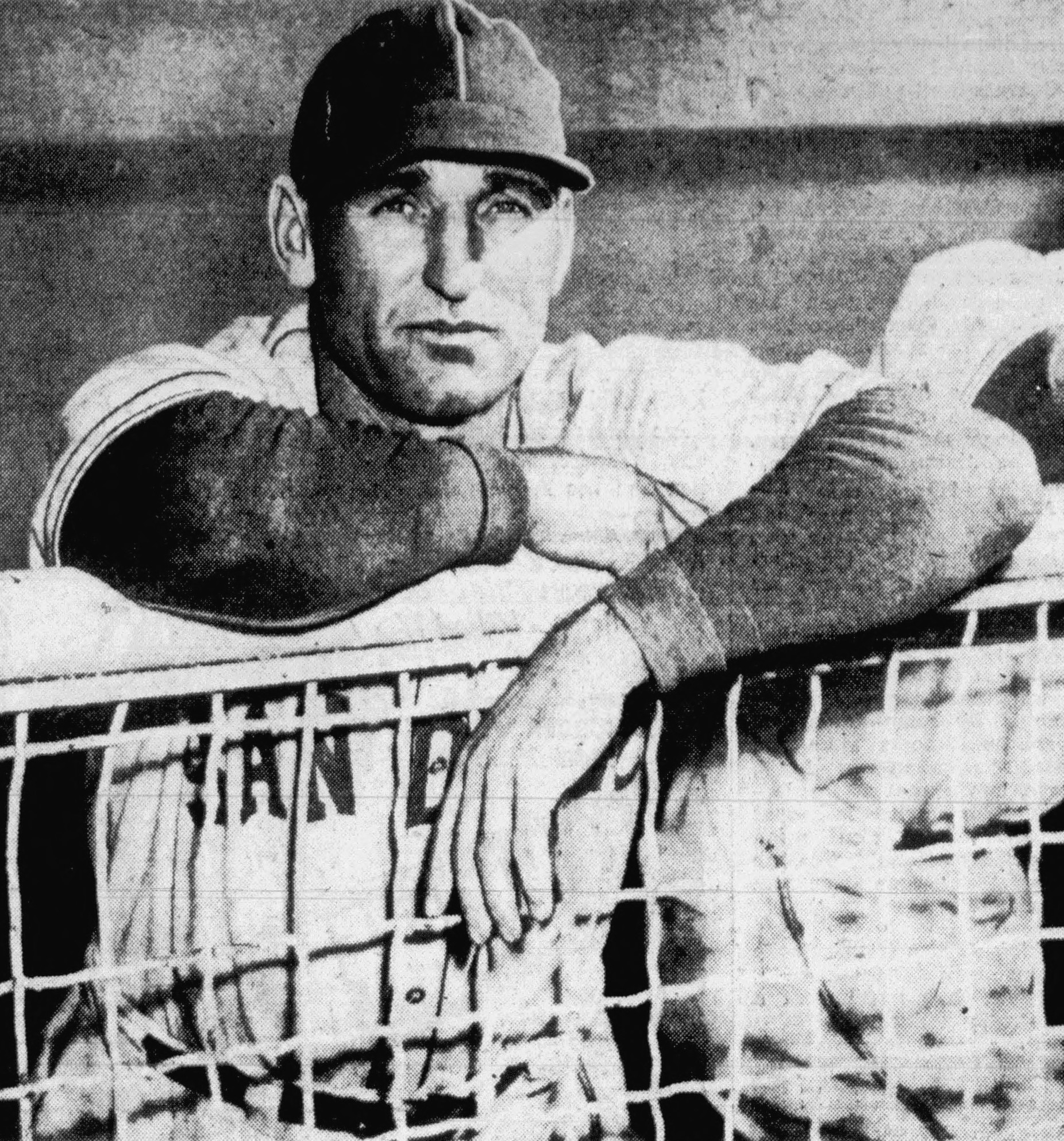
(1946) Pepper Martin, player-manager, San Diego Padres of the Pacific Coast League. Martin managed the Portsmouth Merrimacs in 1954, leading the team to the Piedmont League finals.

A member of the St. Louis Cardinals Hall of Fame, Pepper Martin had become a controversial minor league manager following his lengthy major career in which he was a four- time all-star selection and played on the 1931 and 1944 World Series champion Cardinals teams. In 1945 and 1946, Martin was the player-manager for the San Diego Padres of the Pacific Coast League. In July 1945 it was reported that Martin slapped one of his pitchers in a disagreement. Martin moved to become the player-manager for the 1947 Greenville Spinners in the South Atlantic League. In 1949, Martin was managing the Miami Sun Sox of the Florida International League when he was fined and suspended for the remainder of the season for choking an umpire. In August 1951, Martin was arrested by police after a Sun Sox game for going into the stands and punching a spectator in Lakeland, Florida. He next managed the Miami Beach Flamingos of the Florida International League in 1952. He led the Flamingos to a 103–49 record In 1953, he became the manager of the Fort Lauderdale Lions, remaining in the Florida International League and leading the team to the league title. After spending a portion of the 1954 season with the Portsmouth Merrimacs, Martin became a coach with the Chicago Cubs in 1955.

The 1955 season was the final season for the Piedmont League and Portsmouth team advanced to the playoff final series for the tenth time., Ending the regular season with a record of 64–66, the Merrimacs finished in fourth place. With Ken Guettler serving as Portsmouth's player/manager, the Merrimacs ended the season 13.5 games behind the first place Newport News Dodgers and qualified for the playoffs. In the first round of the four-team playoffs, Portsmouth upset the pennant winning Newport News, defeating the Dodgers 3 games to 1 to advance. In the final games of the Piedmont League, Portsmouth lost in their tenth appearance in the league finals, as the Lancaster Red Roses defeated the Merrimacs 3 games to 2 in the best of five series. Portsmouth's player/manager Ken Guettler led the Piedmont League in home runs for the fourth time, hitting with 41 home runs and also leading the league with 113 RBI. Portsmouth drew 36,702 for their season home games and Norfolk led the league in home attendance with 68,596.

The Piedmont League permanently folded following the 1955 season, officially disbanding on February 27, 1956. After a four-season hiatus, Portsmouth next hosted minor league baseball in 1961, when the Portsmouth-Norfolk Tides team was formed and began play as members of the South Atlantic League. The Tides franchise relocated from Portsmouth to neighboring Norfolk, Virginia, in 1970 and become the Tidewater Tides of the International League. The franchise evolved into today's Class AAA level Norfolk Tides.

== The ballparks ==
=== Sewanee Stadium: 1935 to 1940 ===
The Portsmouth teams played minor league baseball home games at Sewanee Stadium from 1935 to 1941. The stadium was also home to professional football, hosting the Portsmouth Cubs (coached by Ace Parker in 1937) and Portsmouth Sewanees football teams of the Dixie League between 1936 and 1942. Sewanee Stadium was built in 1921. Portsmouth still played a few baseball games each season at Sewanee Stadium after Lawrence Stadium was constructed. The ballpark had field dimensions of (Left, Center, Right): 290–385–335. In 1933, the ballpark hosted the Portsmouth Revels of the Negro Leagues with Baseball Hall of fame member Buck Leonard on the roster. In the era, Sewanee Stadium was located near the corner of Washington Street and Lincoln Street in Portsmouth, Virginia.

=== Portsmouth Stadium / Frank Lawrence Stadium: 1941 to 1955 ===
After Portsmouth Stadium was constructed in 1936 to host both baseball and football, the Portsmouth Cubs split time playing between the two ballparks. Beginning with the 1941 season, Portsmouth teams began to play mainly at Lawrence Stadium. Originally named Portsmouth Stadium, the stadium was later named for Frank Lawrence, who was the owner of the Portsmouth Cubs and Merrimacs teams in the era. Lawrence helped to lead the efforts to build the new ballpark, which had a construction cost of $250,000.

Frank Lawrence often leased Lawrence Stadium to Joe Lewis, a former Negro leagues player. Lewis would organize exhibitions with Negro league teams such as the Indianapolis Clowns, Kansas City Monarchs and the Homestead Grays, with Hall of Famer Josh Gibson to play at the ballpark. Josh Gibson reportedly hit a home run at Lawrence Stadium that cleared the football press box and landed on Glasgow Street, traveling an estimated 585 feet. Gibson's Homestead Grays teammate, Hall of Fame member Buck Leonard, played for Portsmouth in 1953.

Portsmouth Stadium / Frank Lawerence stadium was located at Queens Street & Jamestown Avenue in Portsmouth, Virginia. After the baseball/football field bleachers were demolished in 1992, today, the site hosts the athletic facilities for I. C. Norcom High School, which opened in 1997.

== Timeline ==
Year(s)	# Yrs.	Team	Level	League	Affiliate	Ballpark
1935	1	Portsmouth Truckers	Class B	Piedmont League	Chicago Cubs	Sewanee Stadium
1936–1938	3	Portsmouth Cubs	Class B	Piedmont League	Chicago Cubs	Sewanee Stadium
1939–1940	6	Portsmouth Cubs	Class B	Piedmont League	Philadelphia Phillies	Sewanee Stadium
1941–1947	4	Portsmouth Cubs	Class B	Piedmont League	Chicago Cubs	Frank Lawerence Stadium
1948–1952	5	Portsmouth Cubs	Class B	Piedmont League	None	Frank Lawerence Stadium
1953–1955	3	Portsmouth Merrimacs	Class B	Piedmont League	None	Frank Lawerence Stadium

== Year–by–year records ==
Year	Record	Finish	Manager	Playoffs/Notes
1935	67–72	5th	Pip Koehler	Did not qualify
1936	66–77	5th	Pip Koehler	Did not qualify
1937	75–62	3rd	Elmer Yoter	Lost League Finals
1938	69–67	4th	Dick Luckey	Lost in 1st round
1939	66–71	5th (tie)	Jim Keesey	Did not qualify
1940	59–78	7th	Ray Brubaker (19–26) / Art McHenry (40–52)	Did not qualify
1941	75–65	2nd	Don Curry	Lost in 1st round
1942	80–55	2nd	Tony Lazzeri	Lost League Finals
1943	90–40	1st	Milt Stock	Won league pennant Lost League Finals
1944	72–67	2nd	Bill Steinecke (64–56) / Jake Levy / Jimmie Foxx	Lost League Finals
1945	67–69	4th	Ival Goodman	League champions
1946	83–57	2nd	Gene Hasson / Ace Parker	Lost in 1st round
1947	69–71	3rd	Gene Hasson	Lost in 1st round
1948	71–69	3rd	Ace Parker	Lost in 1st round
1949	74–66	2nd	Skeeter Scalzi	Lost League Finals
1950	83–54	1st	Skeeter Scalzi	Won league pennant Lost League Finals
1951	74–67	4th	Reggie Otero	Lost in 1st round
1952	71–64	2nd	Reggie Otero	Lost League Finals
1953	72–63	4th	Bob Ankrum	Lost in 1st round
1954	71–69	4th	Alex Monchak (50–47) / Pepper Martin (21–22)	Lost League Finals
1955	64–66	4th	Ken Guettler	Lost League Finals

== Notable alumni ==
- Jimmie Foxx (1944, MGR) Inducted Baseball Hall of Fame, 1951
- Tony Lazzeri (1942, MGR) Inducted Baseball Hall of Fame, 1991
- Buck Leonard (1953) Inducted Baseball Hall of Fame, 1972
- Ace Parker (1937, 1939, 1941, 1947; 1946, 1948, MGR) Inducted Pro Football Hall of Fame, 1972
- Earl Allen (1937–1938)
- Jim Asbell (1935)
- Stew Bowers (1940)
- Harry Brecheen (1937) 2× MLB All-Star; St. Louis Cardinals Hall of Fame
- Ralph Brickner (1950)
- Ray Brubaker (1940, MGR)
- Red Bullock (1937)
- Smoky Burgess (1945) 9× MLB All-Star; Cincinnati Reds Hall of Fame
- Hank Camelli (1937)
- Frank Campos (1944–1945, 1948)
- Lou Ciola (1947–1948)
- Jorge Comellas (1943, 1948)
- Como Cotelle (1940)
- Chet Covington (1939, 1948)
- Buddy Crump (1935)
- Manuel Cueto (1938)
- Bill Donovan (1937–1939)
- Art Evans (1939)
- George Eyrich (1949)
- Stu Flythe (1937)
- Ted Fritsch (1944) Green Bay Packers Hall of Fame
- Charlie Frye (1940)
- Ramón García (1951–1952)
- Cecil Garriott (1942)
- Greek George (1952)
- Ival Goodman (1945, MGR)
- Lou Grasmick (1945, 1949)
- Ken Guettler (1955, MGR)
- Don Hasenmayer (1950–1951)
- Gene Hasson (1946–1947, MGR)
- George Hennessey (1945)
- Snake Henry (1935–1936)
- Bill Herring (1935–1936)
- Kirby Higbe (1935–1936) 2× MLB All-Star
- Gordie Hinkle (1936)
- Red Howell (1944)
- Johnny Hutchings (1936)
- Natilla Jiménez (1944)
- Jim Keesey (1939, MGR)
- Stan Keyes (1939)
- Pip Koehler (1935–1936, MGR)
- Guy Lacy (1935)
- Tom Lanning (1935)
- Brooks Lawrence (1953) MLB All-Star; Cincinnati Reds Hall of Fame
- Glenn Liebhardt (1938)
- Hod Lisenbee (1941)
- Wes Livengood (1941–1942)
- Danny Lynch (1950)
- Duke Markell (1950)
- Pepper Martin (1954, MGR) 4× MLB All-Star; St. Louis Cardinals Hall of Fame
- Len Matarazzo (1954)
- Carmen Mauro (1945)
- Minnie Mendoza (1955)
- Bud Metheny (1949–1950)
- Al Monchak (1937; 1954, MGR)
- Danny Morejón (1954)
- Earl Mossor (1949–1950)
- Bill Nicholson (1937) 5× MLB All-Star
- Rube Novotney (1945)
- Paul O'Dea (1941)
- Tony Ordeñana (1943, 1948)
- Reggie Otero (1948; 1951–1952, MGR)
- Jack Owens (1943)
- Roy Partee (1942)
- Ted Pawelek (1948–1949)
- Jim Pearce (1947)
- Charlie Peete (1953–1954)
- Leon Pettit (1938)
- Pep Rambert (1950)
- Armando Roche (1952)
- Buck Rogers (1939–1940)
- Jack Russell (1942) MLB All-Star
- Jack Sanford (1955)
- Skeeter Scalzi (1949–1950, MGR)
- Hank Schenz (1941–1942)
- Phil Seghi (1941)
- Eddie Stanky (1937–1939) 3× MLB All-Star
- Irv Stein (1943)
- Bill Steinecke (1939–1943; 1944, MGR)
- Milt Stock (1943, MGR)
- Ed Sudol (1942)
- Bud Tinning (1938)
- Red Treadway (1949–1950)
- Hal Wagner (1937) 2× MLB All-Star
- Rube Walker (1945)
- Al Williams (1935)
- Max Wilson (1939–1941, 1949)
- Johnnie Wittig (1937)
- Elmer Yoter (1937, MGR)
- Eddie Yount (1938–1939)

== See also ==
- Portsmouth Cubs players
- Portsmouth Merrimacs players
- Portsmouth Truckers players

== See also ==
- Portsmouth, Virginia minor league baseball history
- List of NFL MVP awards
