= Carmen Mauro =

American baseball player (1926–2003)

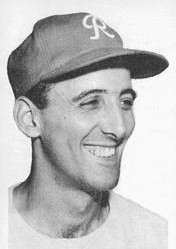
- Outfielder
- Born: November 10, 1926; Saint Paul, Minnesota, U.S.
- Died: December 19, 2003 (aged 77); Carmichael, California, U.S.
- Batted: Left Threw: Right

MLB debut
- October 1, 1948, for the Chicago Cubs

Last MLB appearance
- September 27, 1953, for the Philadelphia Athletics

MLB statistics
- Batting average: .231
- Home runs: 2
- RBI: 33
- Stats at Baseball Reference

Teams
- Chicago Cubs (1948, 1950–1951); Brooklyn Dodgers (1953); Washington Senators (1953); Philadelphia Athletics (1953)

Carmen Louis Mauro (November 10, 1926 – December 19, 2003) was an American professional baseball outfielder. He played all or part of four seasons in Major League Baseball between 1948 and 1953.

== Biography ==
Seventeen-year-old Mauro was signed as an amateur free agent by the Chicago Cubs before the 1944 season. The young outfielder was farmed out to the Lockport Cubs of the Class D Pennsylvania–Ontario–New York League (PONY League), where he appeared in 89 games and hit .294. Carmen spent his first five seasons in the minors, hitting over .300 twice: first in 1945, in a split season with the class B Hagerstown Owls and the Portsmouth Cubs, hitting .305 with 6 homers; secondly in 1947, when he hit .308 for the Des Moines Bruins of the class A Western League.

Mauro got about as late a season call-up as a man could get when the parent Chicago Cubs brought him to Wrigley Field on October 1, 1948. He appeared in three games, picking up one hit in five at-bats, his first big league hit being an inside-the-park homer off Murry Dickson of the St. Louis Cardinals. He spent two full seasons with the Cubs, hitting .227 in 1950 but only .172 in 1951. The Cubbies traded him to the Brooklyn Dodgers for Toby Atwell in December, who sent the 25-year-old Mauro to the International League for his career year, hitting .327 with eleven homers in 140 games for the Montreal Royals in 1952.

Mauro started out 1953 with the Dodgers, getting into only eight games before being taken off waivers by the Washington Senators in May, and then again off waivers by the Philadelphia Athletics in June. He managed to hit an aggregate .255 for the season, his last in the bigs, finishing his four-year big league career with a .231 average and two home runs in 456 plate appearances.

He spent five more years in the minors, almost all in the Pacific Coast League with the Seattle Rainiers, ending a 14-year minor league career in 1958 with a .295 average and 84 home runs. When his playing days were over, he earned a bachelor's degree and a master's degree in education at the University of Washington and served as the Huskies' head baseball coach from 1961 to 1963. From 1964 until his retirement in 1986 he taught, directed student services and coached baseball at Cuesta Junior College in San Luis Obispo, California. An accomplished pianist, organist and accordionist, he was honored with the establishment of a Carmen Mauro Music Scholarship at Cuesta in 1990. He died at 77 on December 19, 2003, in Carmichael, California.
