= Samantha, Alabama =

- Unincorporated community
- Location within Alabama Location within the United States
- Coordinates: 33°25′20″N 87°36′19″W
- Country: United States
- State: Alabama
- County: Tuscaloosa
- Elevation: 394 ft (120 m)
- Time zone: UTC-6 (Central (CST))
  - Summer (DST): UTC-5 (CDT)
- ZIP code: 35482
- Area codes: 205, 659
- GNIS feature ID: 157010

Samantha is an unincorporated community in Tuscaloosa County, Alabama, United States. Samantha is located along U.S. Route 43, 14.8 miles (23.8 km) north of Tuscaloosa. Samantha has a post office with ZIP code 35482. Samantha was named in honor of the wife of the first postmaster, Sylvester Monroe Cowden.

== Notable people ==
- Dan Boone, Major League Baseball pitcher
- Ike Boone, Major League Baseball player
