= Lou Ciola =

American baseball player (1922-1981)

- Pitcher
- Born: September 6, 1922; Norfolk, Virginia, US
- Died: October 18, 1981 (aged 59); Austin, Minnesota, US
- Batted: Right Threw: Right

MLB debut
- July 25, 1943, for the Philadelphia Athletics

Last MLB appearance
- September 28, 1943, for the Philadelphia Athletics

MLB statistics (through 1943)
- Win–loss record: 1–3
- Earned run average: 5.56
- Strikeouts: 7
- WHIP: 1.603
- Stats at Baseball Reference

Teams
- Philadelphia Athletics (1943)

Louis Alexander Ciola (1922–1981) was an American Major League Baseball pitcher. He played for the Philadelphia Athletics during the 1943 season.

== Playing career ==
With World War II raging, and many of baseball's top stars enlisted in military service, teams like the Philadelphia A's were in need of talent to fill out their rosters. Lou Ciola made his major league debut in relief of Roger Wolff in a 5–0 loss to the Detroit Tigers. Ciola came in with the A's down 5-0. He would pitch a scoreless inning, earning no decision. While Ciola did not strike a batter out in his debut, he did work a 1-2-3 inning. First, he got Tigers pitcher Dizzy Trout to hit into a ground out at first base. This was followed by Bobby Estalella hitting a grounder to A's shortstop Joe Hoover for out number two. After walking Dick Siebert, Ciola retired Hal Wagner on a ground out to first. In making his debut, Ciola became the fifth player from the University of Richmond to make it to the major leagues, following Clarence Berger, Tom Miller, Jack Sanford, and Porter Vaughan.

Ciola would appear in 12 games overall, mostly in relief, but earning an occasional start. He struggled badly in losses to the Cleveland Indians and Chicago White Sox. However, in what would be his final major league appearance, Ciola pitched a complete game 8–3 win over the St. Louis Browns and in the process, earning his first and only win in his major league career.

Ciola made his Major League debut despite never spending a day in the minor leagues. Ciola would miss the next two seasons due to military commitments. Returning to Philadelphia, Ciola pitched for their Single A team, the Savannah Indians in the Sally League. After drawing his outright release at the end of 1946, Ciola hooked on the next year for the Chicago Cubs. Ciola pitched two years in the Cubs chain for the Portsmouth Cubs of the Piedmont League. At the end of the 1948 season, Ciola was drafted by the St. Louis Cardinals in the minor league draft. He would spend the rest of his career in the minor leagues for the Cardinals, mainly at the lower levels. Only reach, did he come close to reaching the majors once again. He pitched one game for the Rochester Red Wings, the Triple A club for the Cardinals. He pitched one game, and allowed one hit, one run, one earned run, while walking two batters in his only appearance for the Wings. He was demoted to Double-A Houston on the Texas league, and Ciola never again got close to the major leagues.

Ciola mainly played at the Single A level. No longer a prospect, Ciola mainly served as a veteran arm and mentor to other pitchers and pitching prospects in the minor leagues. At the age of 31, Ciola played his final season of baseball, going 7–5 with a 3:06 E.R.A. for the Omaha Cardinals of the Western League.
