= Dan Boone (baseball) =

American baseball player (1895–1968)

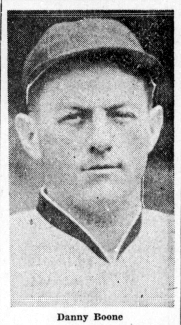
- Pitcher
- Born: January 19, 1895; Samantha, Alabama, U.S.
- Died: June 11, 1968 (aged 73); Tuscaloosa, Alabama, U.S.
- Batted: Right Threw: Right

MLB debut
- September 10, 1919, for the Philadelphia Athletics

Last MLB appearance
- October 6, 1923, for the Cleveland Indians

MLB statistics
- Win–loss record: 8–13
- Earned run average: 5.10
- Strikeouts: 25
- Stats at Baseball Reference

Teams
- Philadelphia Athletics (1919); Detroit Tigers (1921); Cleveland Indians (1922–1923)

James Albert "Dan" Boone (January 19, 1895 – June 11, 1968) was an American professional baseball pitcher. He played in Major League Baseball (MLB) from 1919 to 1923 for the Philadelphia Athletics, Detroit Tigers, and Cleveland Indians. His younger brother, Ike, also played in the major leagues from 1922 to 1932.

== History ==
Boone reached the majors in 1919 with the Philadelphia Athletics, spending one year with them before moving to the Detroit Tigers (1921) and Cleveland Indians (1922–1923).In a four-season career, he posted an 8–13 record with 25 strikeouts and a 5.10 earned run average in 162 1/3 innings pitched, including four complete games and two shutouts.

In 1926, while playing for the High Point Pointers of the Class C level Piedmont League, Dan Boone batted .399 with 28 home runs and 214 total hits on the season while playing exclusively at first base. At age 32, in 1927, Boone began five season tenure as the High Point Pointers player/manager, hitting .342 in 18 games with 12 home runs and 27 doubles while playing in the outfield. Playing in 128 games, in 1928 as the player/manager for High Point, Boone hit .419 with 38 home runs 11 triples and 40 doubles on 198 total hits on the season. At age 33, continuing as the High Point player/manager, Boone hit 46 home runs while batting .372 in 140 games in 1929. Playing in 128 games, while serving as the High Point Pointers player/manager, Boone hit .385 with 25 home runs and 46 doubles on the 1930 season, his final full season with High Point.

In the 1931 season, Boone played in 73 games with High Point, serving as their player/manager. Boone hit .388 with 20 home runs and then played the end of the season with the York White Roses of the Class B level New York-Penn League, hitting .348 in 48 games. In 1932, Boone became the player/manager of the Charleston Senators of the Middle Atlantic League, where his two-season tenure with Charleston marked the last seasons of his professional career.

Boone died in Tuscaloosa, Alabama, at the age of 73.
