= Bunny Hearn =

American baseball player (1891–1959)

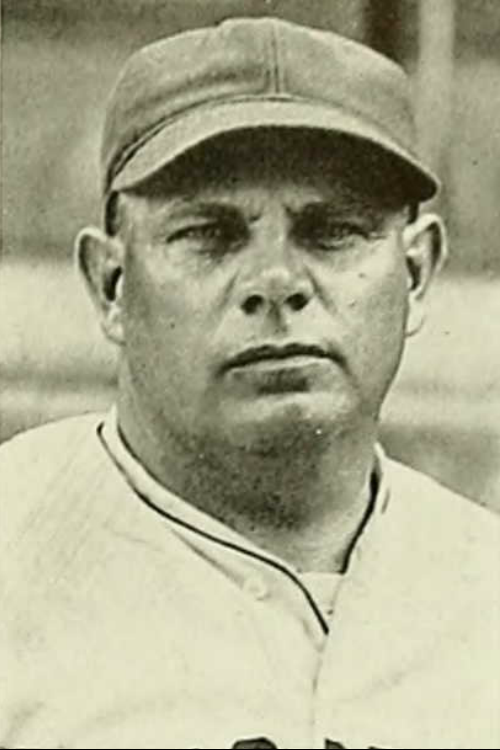
- Hearn, c. 1938
- Pitcher
- Born: May 21, 1891; Chapel Hill, North Carolina, U.S.
- Died: October 10, 1959 (aged 68); Wilson, North Carolina, U.S.
- Batted: Left Threw: Left

MLB debut
- September 17, 1910, for the St. Louis Cardinals

Last MLB appearance
- July 2, 1920, for the Boston Braves

MLB statistics
- Win–loss record: 13–24
- Strikeouts: 111
- Earned run average: 4.91
- Stats at Baseball Reference

Teams
- St. Louis Cardinals (1910–11); New York Giants (1913); Pittsburgh Rebels (1915); Boston Braves (1918, 1920)

Charles Bunn "Bunny" Hearn (May 21, 1891 – October 10, 1959) was an American Major League Baseball pitcher, Major League scout, and minor league, semi-pro and college-level manager.

== Biography ==
He was born on May 21, 1891, in Chapel Hill, North Carolina.

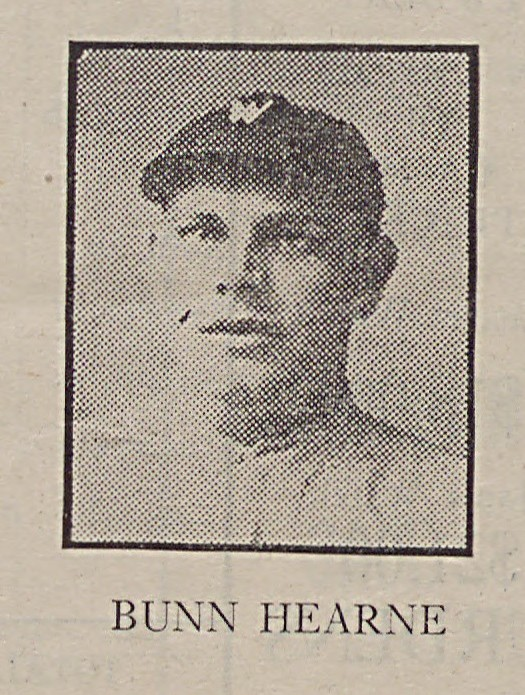
Hearn as a minor league pitcher in 1923.

Hearn attended Elon College and what is now Mississippi State University. His 109 strikeouts in 1910 was an Elon single-season record that stood for 67 years.

In the minor leagues, Hearn won 22 games for the 1916 New London Planters. The 1916 squad was named one of the one hundred greatest teams in minor league history by the official Minor League Baseball website.

During his Major League career, Hearn played for the St. Louis Cardinals, the New York Giants, the Federal League Pittsburgh Rebels, and the Boston Braves. He compiled a record of 13–24 over six seasons. He was later a scout for the Boston Red Sox.

Following the 1913 season, Hearn was a member of John McGraw's world touring team. At a game in London, Hearn explained the various grips pitchers used on the ball to King George V. Later in life, he would often brag that he taught the King of England how to throw a curve.

In 1928, Hearn was a part-owner, manager, and pitcher for the Piedmont League team in Winston-Salem that won the title.

During the 1930s, Hearn managed teams in the semi-professional Coastal Plain League including the Kinston Eagles who won the league championship in 1935.

Hearn served as head coach of the North Carolina Tar Heels in 1917 and 1918, and again from 1932 to 1946. He compiled a record of 214–133–2 while in Chapel Hill. Hearn's Tar Heels won six Southern Conference titles and two Ration League titles.

He died on October 10, 1959, in Wilson, North Carolina

== Legacy ==
Hearn was inducted into the North Carolina Sports Hall of Fame in 1993, the American Baseball Coaches Association Hall of Fame in 1966, and the Elon Sports Hall of Fame in 1975.

== Sources ==
- BR page
- BR minors
- NC Sports Hall bio
- New London team
- Gaunt, Robert (1997). We Would Have Played Forever: The Story of the Coastal Plain Baseball League. Baseball America, Inc. ISBN 0-945164-02-5.
