= Harry Wilke =

American baseball player (1900–1991)

- Third baseman
- Born: December 14, 1900; Cincinnati, Ohio, U.S.
- Died: June 21, 1991 (aged 90); Hamilton, Ohio, U.S.
- Batted: Right Threw: Right

MLB debut
- May 12, 1927, for the Chicago Cubs

Last MLB appearance
- May 14, 1927, for the Chicago Cubs

MLB statistics
- Games played: 3
- At bats: 9
- Hits: 0
- Stats at Baseball Reference

Teams
- Chicago Cubs (1927)

Henry Joseph Wilke (December 14, 1900 – June 21, 1991) was an American third baseman in Major League Baseball. He played for the Chicago Cubs in 1927.
