= Newport News Dodgers =

- 1944–1955; Newport News, Virginia

Minor league affiliations
- Previous classes: Class B
- Previous leagues: Piedmont League (1944-1955)

Major league affiliations
- Previous teams: Brooklyn Dodgers (1944-1955)

Minor league titles
- League titles: 3 (1946, 1948, 1954)

The Newport News Dodgers were a minor league baseball affiliate of the Brooklyn Dodgers from 1944 to 1955. They played in the Piedmont League and were based in Newport News, Virginia. The teams played at Peninsula War Memorial Stadium on Pembroke Avenue in Hampton, Virginia from 1948 to 1955. The stadium was built by Brooklyn Dodgers president Branch Rickey. Previously, Newport News teams played at Builders' Park on Warwick Road (1944–1947) and prior to that at a ballpark on Wickham Avenue on the East End of Newport News. The Piedmont League folded after the 1955 season, ending Newport News' franchise.

Newport News won Piedmont League championships in 1946, 1948, and 1954.

== Notable Newport News alumni ==
- Gil Hodges (1946) inducted Baseball Hall of Fame, 2022
- Duke Snider (1944) inducted Baseball Hall of Fame, 1980
- Chuck Connors (1946) actor
- Roger Craig (1951, 1954)
- Billy Hunter (1949) MLB All-Star
- Clem Labine (1944, 1947) two-time MLB All-Star
- Bob Lillis (1951, 1953)
- Danny Ozark (1948)
- Johnny Podres (1951) four-time MLB All-Star; 1955 World Series Most Valuable Player; 1956 NL earned run average leader
- Ed Roebuck (1950)
- Larry Sherry (1955) 1959 World Series Most Valuable Player
- Norm Sherry (1951, 1954)
- Stan Williams (1955) two-time MLB All-Star
