= John Jones (baseball) =

American baseball player (1901-1956)

- Outfielder
- Born: May 13, 1901; Coatesville, Pennsylvania
- Died: November 3, 1956 (aged 55); Baltimore, Maryland
- Batted: Left Threw: Left

MLB debut
- September 26, 1923, for the Philadelphia Athletics

Last MLB appearance
- August 20, 1932, for the Philadelphia Athletics

MLB statistics
- Batting average: .200
- Home runs: 0
- Runs Batted In: 1
- Stats at Baseball Reference

Teams
- Philadelphia Athletics (1923, 1932)

John William Jones, nicknamed "Skins" (May 13, 1901 – November 3, 1956), was a Major League Baseball outfielder. He was born in Coatesville, Pennsylvania, USA and attended Penn State University. He died at the age of 55 in Baltimore, Maryland, and was buried in Fairview Cemetery in Coatesville.

As a baseball player, Jones was 5'11" and 185 pounds. He threw and batted left-handed. He made his big league debut on September 26, 1923 at the age of 22 with the Philadelphia Athletics. He played in only that game in 1923, going 1 for 4 with a RBI and a strikeout. Jones would have to wait about nine years before he got to play in the Majors again-the next time he saw Major League action was in 1932 at the age of 31. That season, he collected one hit in six at-bats (over four games) and he struck out three times. Overall, Jones hit .200 in 10 career at-bats.

Jones played his final Major League game on August 20, 1932.

== Sources ==
- Career statistics from Baseball Reference
