= Lee Gooch =

American baseball player (1890–1966)

- Outfielder
- Born: February 23, 1890; Oxford, North Carolina, U.S.
- Died: May 18, 1966 (aged 76); Raleigh, North Carolina, U.S.
- Batted: Right Threw: Right

MLB debut
- August 17, 1915, for the Cleveland Indians

Last MLB appearance
- June 28, 1917, for the Philadelphia Athletics

MLB statistics
- Batting average: .295
- Home runs: 1
- Runs scored: 4
- Stats at Baseball Reference

Teams
- Cleveland Indians (1915); Philadelphia Athletics (1917)

Lee Currin Gooch (February 23, 1890 – May 18, 1966) was an American Major League Baseball outfielder who played for two seasons. He played for the Cleveland Indians in 1915 and the Philadelphia Athletics in 1917. Gooch also served as the head baseball coach at Duke University in 1919 and at Wake Forest University from 1949 to 1950.
