= LaSalle Blue Sox =

- 1914; LaSalle, Illinois

Minor league affiliations
- Class: Class D (1914)
- League: Illinois-Missouri League (1914)

Major league affiliations
- Team: None

Minor league titles
- League titles (0): None

Team data
- Name: LaSalle Blue Sox (1914)
- Ballpark: Hegeler Park* (1914)

The LaSalle Blue Sox were a minor league baseball franchise based in LaSalle, Illinois and LaSalle County, Illinois, In 1914, the Blue Sox played as members of the Class D level Illinois-Missouri League, finishing in fourth place before the league folded following the season.

== History ==
LaSalle first hosted minor league baseball in 1914, when the LaSalle "Blue Sox" began play as members of the six–team Class D level Illinois–Missouri League. LaSalle and the new Ottawa, Illinois based franchise replaced the Canton Chinks and Pekin Celestials franchises in the league.

The Champaign-Urbana Velvets, Kankakee Kanks, Lincoln Abes, Ottawa Indians and Streator Boosters teams joined with LaSalle in beginning league play on May 13, 1914. 1914 would be the final season for the Illinois–Missouri League, which was first formed in 1908.

On May 20, 1914, Lincoln defeated LaSalle in a game at LaSalle by the score of 2–1. Player/manager John Fitzpatrick was the third basemen for LaSalle in the loss.

The LaSalle Blue Sox finished in fourth place in 1914, as the Illinois–Missouri league lost two teams during the season. On July 3, 1914, the Lincoln Abes had a record of 32–15 and were in first place when they disbanded along with the Kankakee Kanks. The Champaign Velvets eventually captured the 1914 championship, with LaSalle finishing last among the remaining four teams, when the season ended on August 9, 1914. The LaSalle Blue Sox franchise completed the season with a record of 26-60, playing under managers Anthony Hinley and LaSalle native John Fitzpatrick.

John Fitzpatrick was a native of LaSalle and had an extensive career as a coach/manager following his playing career. As a player, Fitzpatrick played in 1,933 games over 21 seasons (1924–41; 1944–46) as a minor league player, batting .288, but never received a promotion to the major leagues. At one point is his career, he went one and a half years without striking out. Fitzpatrick served as a coach for the Pittsburgh Pirates from 1953 to 1955 and the Milwaukee Braves from 1958 to 1959. He managed minor league teams intermittently beginning in 1936 through 1966. Fitzpatrick hit .261 playing in 79 games as player/manager for LaSalle.

The final standings were led by the Champaign–Urbana Velvets, who finished with a 62–27 record, followed by the Ottawa Indians (47–38), Streator Boosters (40–48) and the La Salle Blue Sox (26–60), who ended the season 25½ games behind Champaign–Urbana. As the Lincoln Abes (32–15) and Kankakee Kanks (14–33) had folded, they were not counted in the final standings. The Illinois–Missouri League permanently folded after the 1914 season.

LaSalle, Illinois has not hosted another minor league team.

== The ballpark ==
The name of the home minor league ballpark for the LaSalle Blue Sox is not directly referenced. Hegeler Park was in use in the era. The park land was donated by the Hegeler family in the early 1900s. Still in use today as the city's largest public park containing ballfields and other amenities, Hegeler Park is located on St. Vincent Avenue between Maple Road and McArthur Road in LaSalle, Illinois.

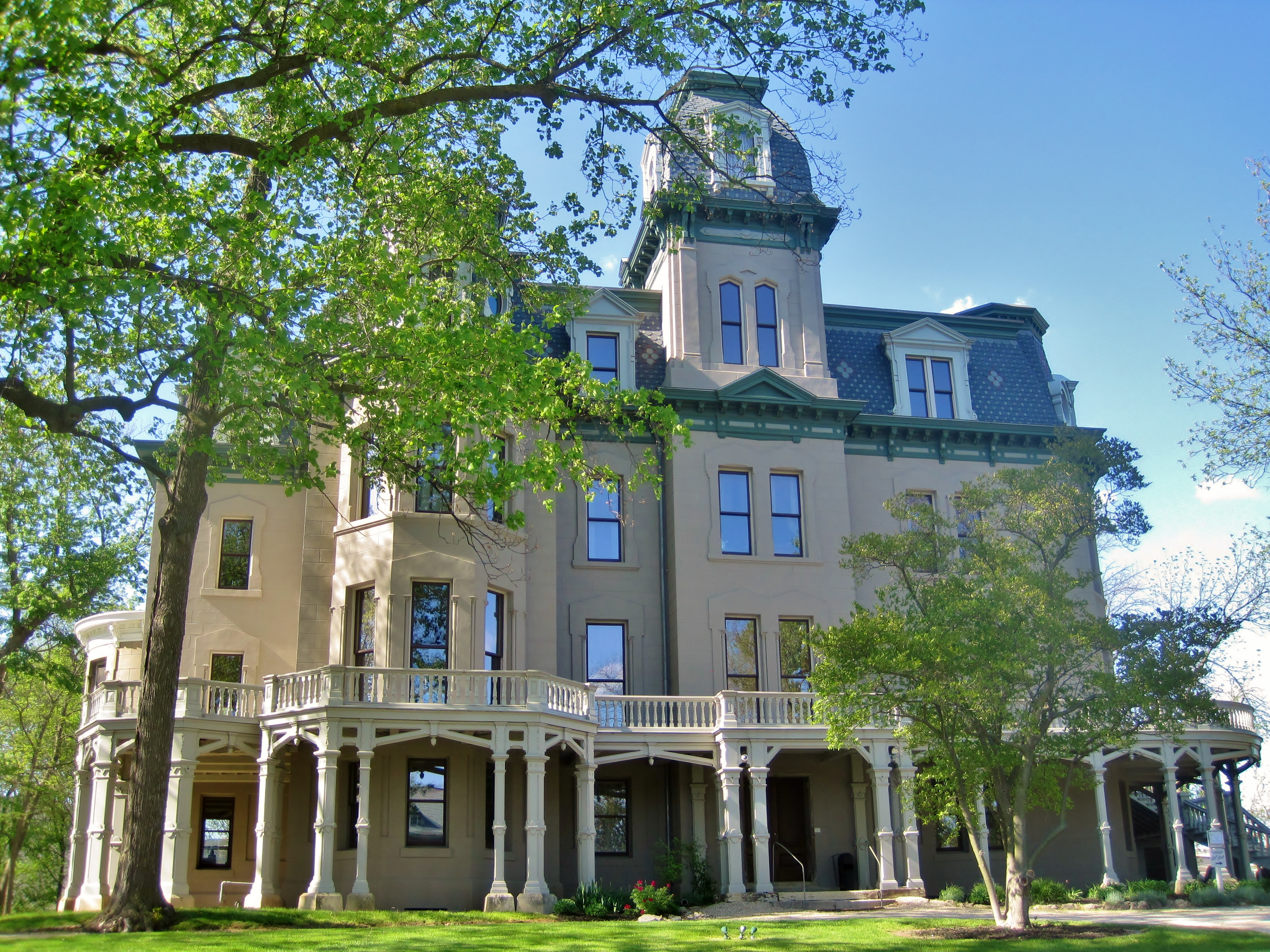
(2013) Hegeler Carus Mansion. LaSalle, Illinois. In the early 1900's, the Hegeler family donated the land for a namesake public park in LaSalle that is still in use today with ballfields.

== Year-by-year record ==
Year	Record	Finish	Manager	Playoffs/Notes
1914	26–60	4th	Anthony Hinley / John Fitzpatrick	No playoffs held

== Notable alumni ==
- Harry Barton (1914)
- John Fitzpatrick (1914, MGR)
- Bill Ludwig (1914)

== See also ==
- LaSalle Blue Sox players
