= Streator Boosters =

- 1912–1915; Streator, Illinois

Minor league affiliations
- Class: Class D (1912–1915)
- League: Illinois-Missouri League (1912–1914); Bi-State League (1915)

Major league affiliations
- Team: None

Minor league titles
- League titles (1): 1915

Team data
- Name: Streator Speedboys (1912); Streator Boosters (1913–1915)
- Ballpark: Streator City Park (1912–1915)

The Streator Boosters were a minor league baseball team based in Streator, Illinois. Beginning play as the Streator "Speedboys" in 1912, Streator teams played as members of the Class D level Illinois-Missouri League from 1912 to 1914 and the Bi-State League in 1915, winning the 1915 league championship. Streator hosted minor league home games at Streator City Park.

== History ==
The Streator Speedboys began minor league baseball play, joining the 1912 Class D level Illinois-Missouri League. In their first season of play, Streator finished the regular season with a 46–65 record, placing last in the six–team Illinois–Missouri League standings and finishing the season 21.0 games behind the first place Lincoln Abes. The Speedboys played the season under Manager Jake Leuter. Streator finished behind the Lincoln Abes 70–47, Pekin Celestials 61–55, Canton Highlanders 57–56, Clinton Champs/Kankakee Kanks 56–56 and the Champaign-Urbana Velvets 53–64 in the standings. Streator played their home games at Streator City Park.

In their second season, the renamed Streator Boosters continued play in the 1913 Illinois–Missouri League. Streator placed fourth in the league with a record of 30–57, as two league teams folded during the season. Bob Coyle and Bob Kahl were the 1913 Streator managers. Streator ended the season 29.0 games behind the first place Lincoln Abes after both Pekin and Canton folded on July 19, 1913. Streator's Roy Phillips led the league with 13 home runs and teammate E.H. Kennedy had led league hitters with 92 total hits.

The 1914 Streator Boosters ended the Illinois–Missouri League regular season with a record of 40–48. Streator placed third in the Illinois–Missouri League standings, playing under managers John Ray and Henry Seebach. The Illinois–Missouri League saw the Lincoln Abes and Kankakee Kanks fold on July 3, 1914, ending the season with four teams as Streator finished 21.0 games behind the first place Champaign-Urbana Velvets. The Illinois–Missouri League permanently folded after the 1914 season.

After the demise of the Illinois–Missouri League, the 1915 Streator Boosters became charter members of the short–lived Class D level Bi-State League and won a championship in a shortened season. The Aurora Foxes, Elgin Watch Makers, Freeport Pretzels, Ottawa Indians and Racine Belles joined Streator in the six-team league. On July 7, 1915, Streator was in first place with a 30–18 record when the Bi–State League permanently folded. Jack Herbert was the manager as Streator finished 1½ games ahead of second place Racine. Booster player Eddie Wise led the league with 5 home runs.

The Bi-State League did not return to play in 1915. Streator has not hosted another minor league team following the 1915 Streator Boosters.

== The ballpark ==
Streator minor league teams played home games at Streator City Park. The Streator City Park is still in use today as a public park, located in the 200 block of North Park Street in Streator, Illinois.

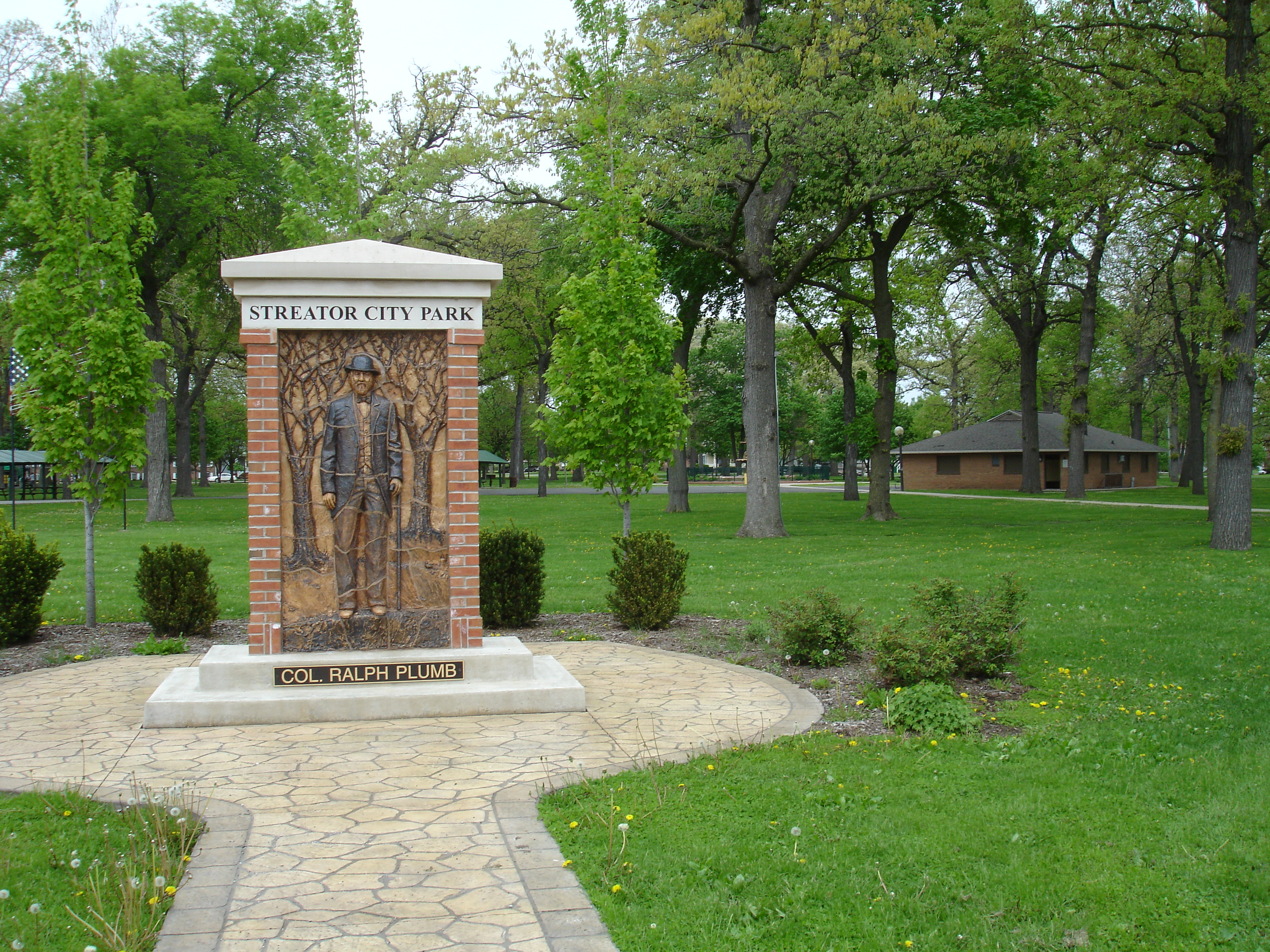
(2008) Streator City Park. Streator, Illinois.

== Timeline ==
Year(s)	# Yrs.	Team	Level	League	Ballpark
1912	1	Streator Speedboys	Class D	Northern Association	Streator City Park
1913–1914	2	Streator Boosters	Class D	Northern Association	Streator City Park
1915	1	Streator Boosters	Class D	Bi-State League	Streator City Park

== Year–by–year records ==
Year	Record	Finish	Manager	Playoffs/Notes
1912	46–65	6th	Jack Leute	No playoffs held
1913	30–57	4th	Bob Coyle / Nick Kahl	No playoffs held
1914	40–48	3rd	John Ray / Heine Seebach	No playoffs held
1915	30–18	1st	Jack Herbert	League folded July 7 League champions

== Notable alumni ==
- Shags Horan (1915)
- Bill Ludwig (1914)
- George Orme (1915)
- Tom Sheehan (1913)
- Dan Tipple (1912)

== See also ==
- Streator Boosters players
- Streator Speedboys players
