= Beardstown Infants =

- 1909–1910; Beardstown, Illinois

Minor league affiliations
- Class: Class D (1909–1910)
- League: Illinois-Missouri League (1909–1910)

Major league affiliations
- Team: None

Minor league titles
- League titles (0): None

Team data
- Name: Beardstown Infants (1909–1910)
- Ballpark: Schmoldt Park (1909–1910)

The Beardstown Infants were a minor league baseball team based in Beardstown, Illinois. In 1909 and 1910, the Infants played as members of the Class D level Illinois-Missouri League, hosting home games at Schmoldt Park.

== History ==
In 1909, Beardstown began hosting minor league play when the Beardstown "Infants" became members of the Class D-level Illinois-Missouri League. Joining Beardstown in the six–team league were the Canton Chinks, Galesburg Boosters, Macomb Potters, Monmouth Browns and Pekin Celestials teams. Pekin and Beardstown were new franchises for the league, replacing the Hannibal Cannibals and Havana Perfectos.

The "Infants" nickname was about the team being a new team and a youthful team.

In their first season of play, the 1909 Beardstown Infants finished as the runner–up in the Illinois–Missouri League. With a regular season record of 77–52, Beardstown placed second in the six–team Illinois–Missouri League standings, playing the season under manager Harry Riggons. Beardstown finished just 1.0 game behind the first place Monmouth Browns in the final league standings. No playoffs were held. Beardstown's Andy Lotshaw led the 1909 Illinois–Missouri League with a .329 average, 146 hits, 14 triples and 72 runs scored. Beardstown notably had three 20–game winners in Merle Spaide (23–9), Cecil Weisenberger (21–14) and C.E. Pettit (20–11).

The 1910 Beardstown Infants returned to play, but the franchise relocated before the end of the Illinois–Missouri League season. When the Class D level Northern Association folded on July 19, 1910, the city of Jacksonville, Illinois was left without a team. The Beardstown Infants filled the vacancy and moved to Jacksonville on July 21, 1910 with a 38–26 record. The Jacksonville Jacks resumed play and the team had an overall record of 44–36 in the Illinois–Missouri League when the franchise folded on August 17, 1910. The Macomb Potters disbanded from the Illinois–Missouri League on the same day. The 1910 Beardstown/Jacksonville managers were Jack Corbett and Pants Rowland.

Manager Jack Corbett is credited with inventing the modern bases with base stems that are now used in baseball. Corbett's name is still incorporated into the logo on major league bases. Pants Rowland later managed the Chicago White Sox to the 1917 World Series Championship. Rowland may have managed the 1910 team only upon relocating to Jacksonville.

The 1910 Beardstown Infants were the last minor league team hosted in Beardstown, Illinois.

== The ballpark ==
The Beardstown Infants played home games at Schmoldt Park. The park is still in use today as a public park with baseball fields. The ballpark was located at North Bay & Wall Streets in Beardstown, Illinois.

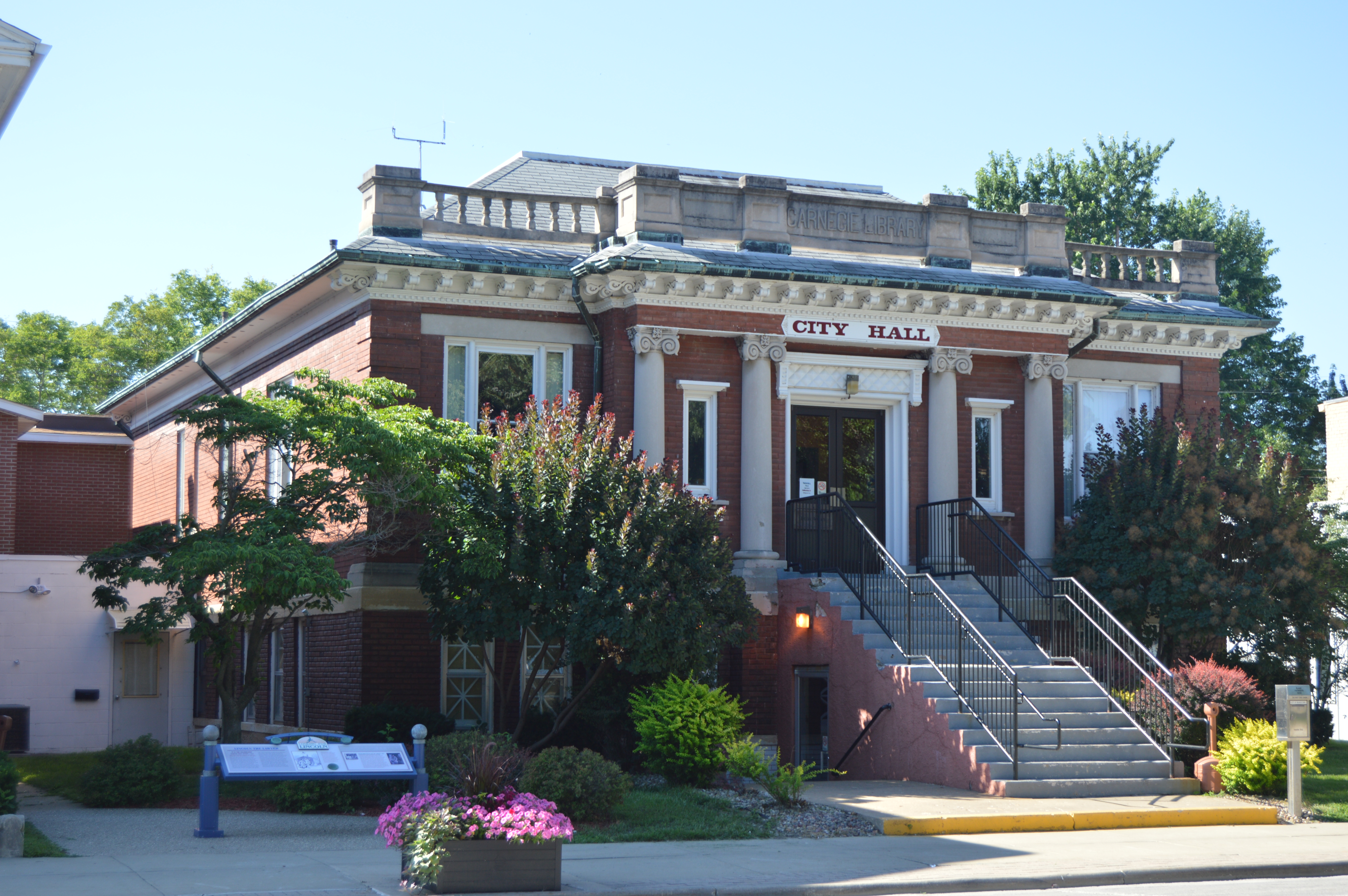
(2014) Beardstown, Illinois Carnegie Library built 1903

== Timeline ==
Year(s)	# Yrs.	Team	Level	League	Ballpark
1909–1910	2	Beardstown Infants	Class D	Illinois-Missouri League	Schmoldt Park

== Year-by-year records ==
Year	Record	Finish	Manager	Playoffs/Notes
1909	77–52	2nd	Harry Riggons	None held
1910	44–36	5th	Jack Corbett / Pants Rowland	Beardstown (38–26) moved to Jacksonville July 21; Team folded August 17

== Notable alumni ==
- Fred Kommers (1909)
- Moxie Meixell (1910)
- Pants Rowland (1910, MGR)

== See also ==
- Beardstown Infants players
