= Illinois–Indiana League =

- Classification: Independent (1889, 1892)
- Sport: Minor League Baseball
- First season: 1889
- Folded: 1892
- Replaced by: Illinois-Iowa League
- President: J.W. Irwin (1889); A.S. Miller (1889); W.W. Kent (1892)
- No. of teams: 13
- Country: United States of America
- Most titles: 1 Terre Haute (1889); Joliet Convicts (1892)

The Illinois–Indiana League or Two–I League was based in Illinois and Indiana and refers the name of two different baseball circuits in Minor league baseball which operated in 1889 and 1892. The league was renamed to the Illinois-Iowa League in 1890 and 1891.

== Cities represented/Teams ==
1889

* Bloomington, Indiana	Bloomington Blues
*Danville, Illinois	Danville Browns
* Decatur, Illinois	Decatur
* Lafayette, Indiana	Lafayette
* Logansport, Indiana/Champaign-Urbana, Illinois	Logansport/Champaign-Urbana Clippers
* Terre Haute, Indiana	Terre Haute

1892

* Aurora, Illinois/Peoria, Illinois	Aurora Indians/Peoria Distillers
* Evansville, Indiana	Evansville
* Jacksonville, Illinois	Jacksonville Lunatics
* Joliet, Illinois	Joliet Convicts
* Quincy, Illinois	Quincy Ravens
* Rock Island, Illinois/Moline, Illinois	Rock Island-Moline Twins
* Rockford, Illinois	Rockford Hustlers
* Terre Haute, Indiana	Terre Haute Hottentots

== Standings & statistics ==
1889 Illinois–Indiana League

Team standings	W	L	PCT	GB	Managers
Terre Haute	20	4	.833	–	William Schneider
Danville Browns	14	13	.519	7½	Harry Smith
Bloomington Blues	5	5	.500	NA	Von Elleau
Decatur	0	10	.000	NA	NA
Logansport / Champaign-Urbana Clippers	NA	NA	NA	NA	F.L. Bills
Lafayette	NA	NA	NA	NA	Rafferty / Alex McFarlan

Bloomington disbanded June 15; Decatur was dropped June 16.; Logansport disbanded and was replaced by Champaign–Urbana.
Finals: Terre Haute 4 games, Danville 0, one tie.

1892 Illinois-Indiana League - schedule

Team standings	W	L	PCT	GB	Managers
Joliet Convicts	55	27	.671	–	Billy Murray
Rockford Hustlers	46	38	.549	10	Hugh Nicol
Rock Island-Moline Twins	37	42	.468	16½	Harry Sage
Jacksonville Lunatics	30	57	.345	27½	Jack Pettiford / Guy Hecker
Evansville Hoosiers	30	20	.600	NA	Albert Schellhase / Jack Wentz
Peoria Distillers / Aurora Indians	26	27	.491	NA	Mike Trost
Terre Haute Hottentots	25	27	.481	NA	George Brackett / Charles Flynn
Quincy Ravens	12	23	.343	NA	Bill Whitrock / John Godar / Samuel Levesque

Peoria (17–8) moved to Aurora May 31; Aurora disbanded July 5; Quincy disbanded June 24; Evansville disbanded July 8; Terre Haute disbanded July 10.

Player statistics
Player	Team	Stat	Tot	Player	Team	Stat	Tot
Fred Underwood	Rockford	BA	.282	Bumpus Jones	Joliet	W	24
Ed Wiswell	Rockford	Runs	77	George Nicol	Rockford	SO	230
Gene Moriarty	Evansville/Jacksonville	Hits	91	Ernest Beam	Terre Haute	ERA	0.91
Gene Moriarty	Evansville/Jacksonville	HR	13	Bumpus Jones	Joliet	PCT	.857 24–4

== Sources ==
- Baseball Reference Encyclopedia and History
