= Havana Perfectos =

- 1908; Havana, Illinois

Minor league affiliations
- Class: Class D (1908)
- League: Illinois-Missouri League (1908)

Major league affiliations
- Team: None

Minor league titles
- League titles (0): None

Team data
- Name: Havana Perfectos (1908)
- Ballpark: Riverside Park (1908)

The Havana Perfectos were a minor league baseball franchise based in Havana, Illinois. In 1908, the Perfectos played as charter members of the Class D level Illinois-Missouri League, finishing in third place in their only season of play. Havana hosted minor league home games at Riverside Park.

== History ==
Minor league baseball began in Havana, Illinois in 1908. The Havana "Perfectos" became charter members of the six–team Class D level Illinois-Missouri League. The Canton Chinks, Galesburg Hornets, Hannibal Cannibals, Macomb Potters and Monmouth Browns franchises joined Havana as charter members of the league.

After beginning league play on May 12, 1908, Havana placed third in the 1908 Illinois–Missouri League final standing. The Perfectos ended the season with a 58–60 record, playing under managers Mike Sampson and Fred Kommers. Havana finished 10.0 games behind the first place Hannibal Cannibals in the final Illinois–Missouri League standings. The six–team league standings were headed Hannibal (68–49), followed by the Macomb Potters (66–53), Havana Perfectos (58–60), Canton Chinks (56–61), Monmouth Browns (55–62) and Galesburg Hornets (50–67).

Havana player/manager Fred Kommers won the Illinois–Missouri League batting championship with a .349 average and the home run title, hitting 11. Kommers also led the league with 153 total hits and 75 runs scored.

The Havana Perfectos folded following the 1908 season. The Hannibal franchise also left the league and the two teams and were replaced by the Pekin Celestials and Beardstown Infants in the 1909 Illinois–Missouri League.

Havana, Illinois has not hosted another minor league team.

== The ballpark ==
The Havana Perfectos hosted home minor league home games at Riverside Park. Today, Riverside Park is still in use as a public park. The park is located at 100 West Main Street at the Illinois River, Havana, Illinois.

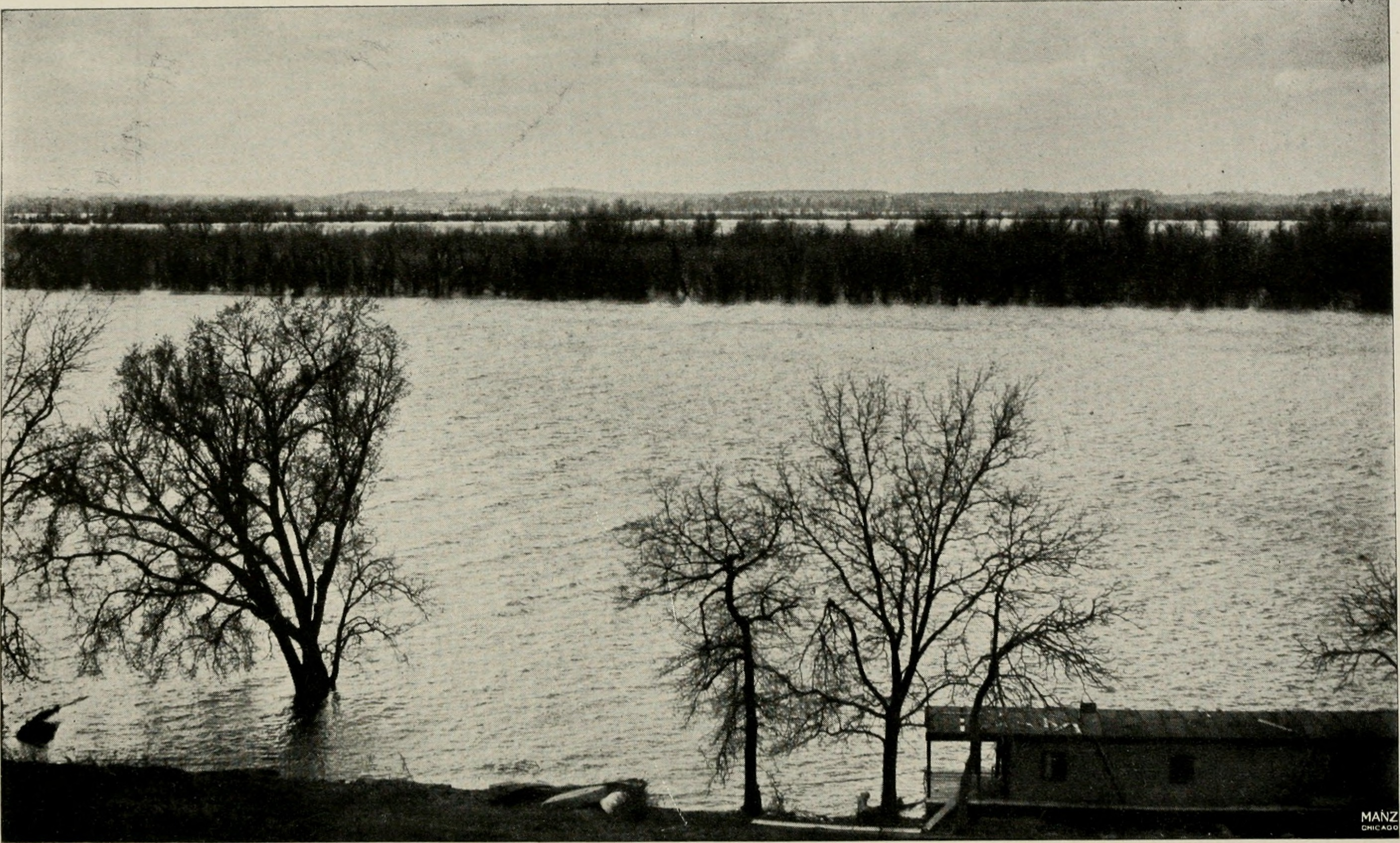
(1904) Havana, Illinois riverfront

== Year–by–year record ==
Year	Record	Finish	Manager	Playoffs/Notes
1908	58–60	3rd	Mike Sampson / Fred Kommers	No playoffs held

== Notable alumni ==
- Fred Kommers (1908, MGR)
- Havana Perfectos players
