= Ottawa, Illinois, minor league baseball history =

Ottawa, Illinois minor league baseball teams
- 1890–1915; (1890–1891, 1914–1915); Ottawa, Illinois

Minor league affiliations
- Class: Independent (1890–1891) Class D (1914–1915)
- League: Illinois-Iowa League (1890–1891); Illinois-Missouri League (1914); Bi-State League (1915)

Major league affiliations
- Team: None

Minor league titles
- League titles (0): None

Team data
- Name: Ottawa Pirates (1890); Ottawa Modocs (1891); Ottawa Indians (1914–1915)
- Ballpark: Lincoln–Douglas Park (1914–1915)

Minor league baseball teams were based in Ottawa, Illinois in various seasons between 1890 and 1915. Ottawa minor league teams played as members of the Illinois-Iowa League in 1890 and 1891, Illinois-Missouri League in 1914 and the Bi-State League in 1915. Ottawa hosted home minor league games at Lincoln–Douglas Park.

== History ==
Minor league baseball began with the 1890 Ottawa Pirates, who played as charter members of the eight–team Illinois-Iowa League, an Independent league. Ottawa ended the 1890 season with a record of 58–50, placing fourth in the Illinois–Iowa League, playing the season under managers James Hillery, William Sinon and Bert Merrifield. The Pirates finished 8.5 games behind the first place Ottumwa Coal Palace Kings in the final standings.

The Ottawa Modocs continued play in the eight–team 1891 Illinois–Iowa League League. The Modocs ended the 1891 season with a record of 53–49, placing fourth in the Illinois–Iowa League standings. Playing under manager Jack Remsen, Ottawa finished 13.0 games behind first place Quincy. The Ottumwa Coal Palaces, Cedar Rapids Canaries, Davenport Pilgrims and Aurora Maroons franchises all folded before the season concluded, leaving the league with just four teams. The Quincy Ravens (65–35), Joliet Giants (62–48) and Rockford Hustlers (54–46) finished ahead of the Modocs in the final standings. The Ottawa franchisee did not return to the 1892 Illinois-Iowa League.

After a hiatus, minor league baseball returned to Ottawa in 1914. The Ottawa Indians became members of the six–team Class D level Illinois–Missouri League. The Indians finished the 1914 season with a record of 47–38, placing second in the Illinois–Missouri League, ending the season 13.0 games behind the first place Champaign Velvets. Chuck Fleming served as manager. Ottawa finished in the final standings with Champaign-Urbana Velvets (62–27), Streator Boosters (40–48) and LaSalle Blue Sox (26–60). The Kankakee Kanks (14–33) and Lincoln Abes (32–15) both folded from the league on July 3, 1914, and the Illinois-Missouri League permanently folded after the 1914 season.

The Ottawa Indians continued play in a new league in 1915 and were the final Ottawa minor league team. Ottawa became charter members of the 1915 the six-team Bi-State League, which formed as a Class D level league. The league permanently folded on July 7, 1915, during its only season of play with Ottawa in last place. Ottawa ended the 1915 season with a record of 20–35 and placed sixth in the Bi–State League standings when the league folded. Louis Ehrgott served as manager, as Ottawa finished in the standings with the Aurora Foxes (25–27), Elgin Watch Makers (27–26), Freeport Pretzels (23–29), Racine Belles (30–20) and Streator Boosters (30–18). The Bi-State League folded after the 1915 season.

Ottawa, Illinois has not hosted another minor league team.

== The ballpark ==
Ottawa teams were noted to have played minor league home games at Lincoln–Douglas Park. The park was named for Ottawa being the site of the first of the 1858 Lincoln–Douglas debates, held at Washington Square Park. Washington Park is on the National Register of Historic Places. Today, the site has historical markers and is located at East 600 Utica Drive, Ottawa, Illinois.

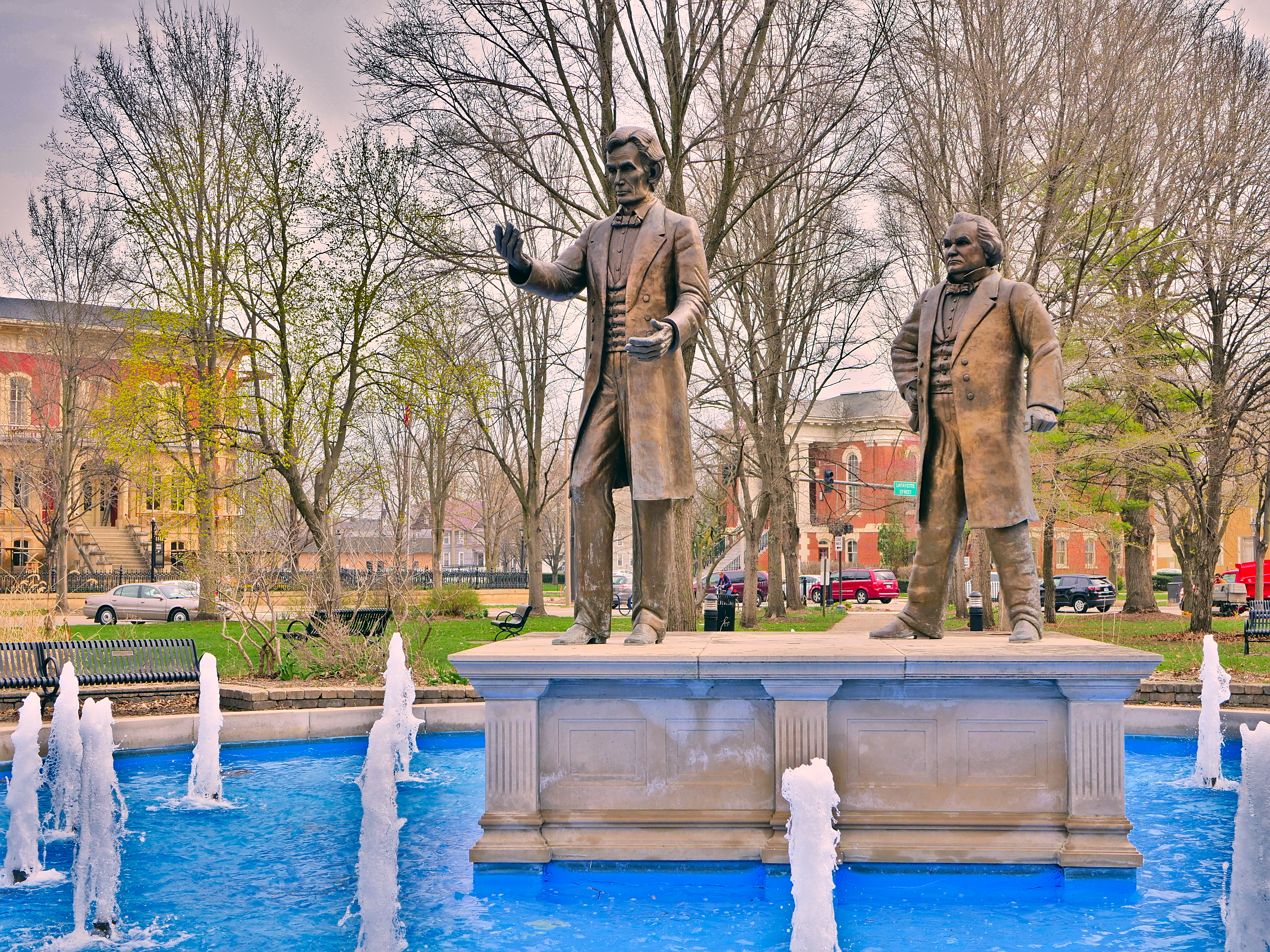
(2019) Lincoln vs Douglas Debate Memorial - Washington Park. National Register of Historic Places. Ottawa Illinois

== Timeline ==
Year(s)	# Yrs.	Team	Level	League
1890	1	Ottawa Pirates	Independent	Illinois-Iowa League
1891	1	Ottawa Modocs	Independent	Illinois-Iowa League
1914	1	Ottawa Indians	Class D	Illinois-Missouri League
1915	1	Ottawa Indians	Class D	Bi-State League

== Year–by–year records ==
Year(s)	Record	Place	Managers	Playoffs/Notes
1890	58–50	4th	James Hillery / William Sinon / Bert Merrifield	No playoffs held
1891	53–49	4th	Jack Remsen	No playoffs held
1914	47–38	2nd	Chuck Fleming	No playoffs held
1915	20–35	6th	Louis Ehrgott	No playoffs held

== Notable alumni ==
- Fritz Clausen (1890)
- Bill Geiss (1890–1891)
- Charlie Gray (1890)
- Frank Hankinson (1891)
- Charlie Jaeger (1914)
- Ed Keas (1891)
- Henry Killeen (1891)
- George Lyons (1914–1915)
- Jack Remsen (1891, MGR)
- Joe Wright (1890)

== See also ==
Ottawa Indians players
Ottawa Modocs players
