= George Kaiserling =

American baseball player (1893-1918)

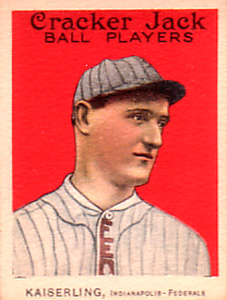
- Pitcher
- Born: May 12, 1893; Steubenville, Ohio, U.S.
- Died: March 2, 1918 (aged 24); Steubenville, Ohio, U.S.
- Batted: Right Threw: Right

MLB debut
- April 20, 1914, for the Indianapolis Hoosiers

Last MLB appearance
- October 3, 1915, for the Newark Peppers

MLB statistics
- Win–loss record: 32–25
- Strikeouts: 150
- Earned run average: 2.68
- Stats at Baseball Reference

Teams
- Indianapolis Hoosiers/Newark Peppers (1914–1915)

George Kaiserling (May 12, 1893 – March 2, 1918) was an American Major League Baseball pitcher. Born and raised in Steubenville, Ohio, he played in the Federal League in 1914 for the Indianapolis Hoosiers, moving with them to New Jersey in 1915 where they became the Newark Peppers. Kaiserling won 17 games for pennant-winning Indianapolis in 1914 and finished seventh in the Federal League with a 2.24 earned run average (ERA) in 1914. After pitching for a minor league team in 1916, he contracted tuberculosis the following year, dying of the disease at age 24 in 1918.

== Early life ==
George Kaiserling was born on May 12, 1893, in Steubenville, Ohio, to Fred and Johanna Kaiserling, who had immigrated from Germany. Fred supported the family's eight children by working for a steelmaking company as a millhand, while Johanna focused on raising the children. Little is known of Kaiserling's early life, but the 1910 United States census reports that he still lived with his family in Steubenville and had not married. Later, when he registered for World War I, he indicated on his draft card that he was married; however, no marriage certificate has ever surfaced.

== Professional career ==
=== Early minor league career (1910–1913) ===
==== Class D (1910–1911) ====
Kaiserling began playing baseball professionally in 1910 with the Great Bend Millers of the Class D Kansas State League. A 17-year-old pitcher, his age was 5.8 years below that of the average player at that position in the league. He had a 12–12 record in 30 games for the team, which finished in fourth place.

In 1911, Kaiserling pitched for two Class D teams in Illinois, splitting the season between the Lincoln Abes and the Clinton Champs of the Illinois–Missouri League. His statistics with the teams are incomplete.

==== South Bend Benders (1912) ====
Kaiserling showed up at spring training with the South Bend Benders of the Class B Central League in 1912. Though he would turn 19 in May, he was nearly seven years younger than the average Central League pitcher. Daunted at spring training because 12 pitchers were competing for roster spots, he asked to be released so the Champaign Velvets of the Illinois–Missouri League could sign him. The request was denied; Harry Arndt, the player-manager of the Benders, was impressed by Kaiserling's talent. The pitcher made the team but struggled early in the season. In May, the Benders attempted to option him to the Muskegon Speeders of the Michigan State League. This time, it was Kaiserling who refused to go, risking suspension by begging to rejoin the ballclub. He had stayed behind in South Bend while the team went on a road trip in which it lost most of its games, and Arndt decided to give Kaiserling another chance, revoking the option when the team returned on May 14.

For the rest of the season, Kaiserling played better. He hit his only professional home run that June, setting a record with the longest home run hit in Zanesville, Ohio. By August, fans and reporters considered him a league star, bestowing him with the nickname, "Der Kaiser" (or "The Emperor", in English). In 29 games, he had an 11–16 record and a 4.75 earned run average (ERA) in 220 innings pitched. The Benders only won 41 games total while losing 88, finishing with a .318 winning percentage.

==== Indianapolis (1913) ====
Before the 1913 season, the Indianapolis Indians of the Class AA American Association purchased Kaiserling's contract, hoping the pitcher could help them improve off of a last-place finish in 1912. The team was in second place through the first month of the 1913 season but fell to seventh in May. Kaiserling pitched inconsistently. After one start, in which he allowed only two hits, he asked for a salary increase; however, he gave up six runs before even recording an out in his next start. Frustrated by Kaiserling's lack of focus on conditioning and learning how to pitch, the Indians sold his contract to the San Francisco Seals of the Class AA Pacific Coast League on July 26. In 27 games for the Indians, he had a 5–7 record and a 5.94 ERA.

Kaiserling never pitched for the Seals, though. Instead, he joined the Indianapolis Hoosiers. He was able to do this because the Hoosiers were members of the outlaw Federal League, playing at the minor league level in their first year of existence. Not a party to baseball's National Agreement of 1903, the Federal League had no reciprocal duty to honor the contracts of teams outside its league. Indianapolis had the league's best record at the time they acquired Kaiserling, and manager Bill Phillips hoped the pitcher could help them in the pennant race.

On August 17, Kaiserling held the St. Louis Terriers to one run on four hits in a 4–1 win. Ten days later, he also allowed just four hits and a run in a 3–1 win over the Pittsburgh Stogies. Appearing in eight games for the Hoosiers, he had a 5–2 record and a 2.66 ERA as Indianapolis won the pennant. Offensively, he hit at least two triples during the season.

Wanting a playoff series, the Federal League decided to have the Hoosiers play a postseason series against an All-Star team composed of players from the other five teams in the league. Though it was originally scheduled to be a best-of-five series, several rainy days caused the league to turn it into a best-of-three instead. The first two games of the series, scheduled to go only seven innings because of fears of bad weather, were played on September 22. In the opener, Kaiserling allowed only four hits in a 2–0 shutout. Impressed by his performance, Phillips let him start the second game. Kaiserling had another shutout going through six innings but gave up three hits and a run in the seventh; however, Indianapolis still clinched the series with a 4–1 victory. After the season, Phillips convinced Kaiserling to pursue a rigid offseason conditioning program.

=== Major league career (1914–1915) ===
==== Indianapolis Hoosiers (1914) ====
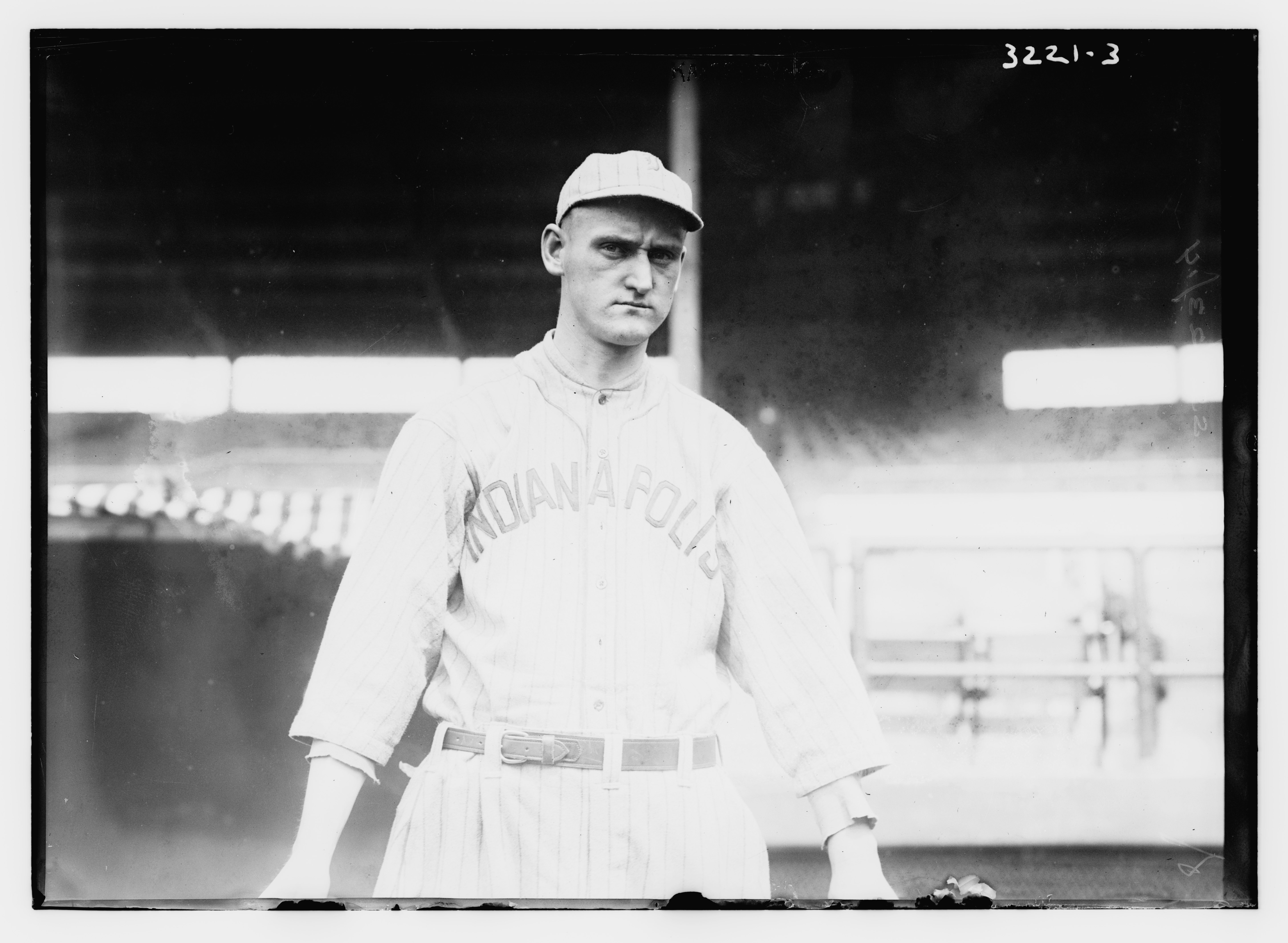
Kaiserling with Indianapolis in 1914

In 1914, Kaiserling reached the major leagues for the first time, as the Federal League rose to the major league level in direct competition with organized baseball's American League (AL) and National League (NL). His start against the Kansas City Packers on April 20 is considered his major league debut; Kaiserling earned the victory in a 7–2 triumph. Used only seven times in the early part of the season, he had a 1–1 record through June 10, as the Hoosiers were in only seventh place in the eight-team league.

Starting on June 11, Kaiserling won five starts in a row, going 7–1 overall from June 11 through July 19. The last game of the stretch, against St. Louis, was what baseball historian Frank Russo called "his personal highlight of the season"; Kaiserling limited the Terriers to one hit in a 3–0 victory. The Hoosiers had moved into first place on a 15-game winning streak from June 11 through 24.

By September, the Hoosiers were in a close battle with the Chicago Federals for the pennant. Kaiserling went 3–3 for the rest of the season as the race remained close. Chicago led on October 5, but Indianapolis took the lead the next day, clinching the Federal League pennant when the season ended on October 8. In 37 games (33 starts) for Indianapolis, Kaiserling had a 17–11 record, a 3.11 ERA, 75 strikeouts, and 72 walks in 275 1/3 innings pitched. His 2.9 Wins Above Replacement (WAR) ranked ninth among Federal League pitchers, his .630 winning percentage ranked sixth, and his 2.354 walks per nine innings pitched ranked eighth. He led the Federal League with 17 hit batsmen. This prompted The Washington Times, in reference to the ongoing war in Europe, to quip, "When looking for gunners how did Wilhelm of Germany miss Kaiserling of the Hoosiers, who hit 17 batters last season?"

==== Newark Peppers (1915) ====
Despite winning the pennant, the Hoosiers struggled financially. After the season, co-owner Harry Ford Sinclair bought out his partners and moved the team to Newark, New Jersey, where it became known as the Newark Peppers. Kaiserling initially held out for more money, then signed his contract for the 1915 season on December 14, 1914. At 1915 spring training, the Indianapolis News observed that he had "rounded to form faster than the other hurlers." He was one of 176 major leaguers featured in the 1915 Cracker Jack baseball card set.

Kaiserling won his first three games of 1915, including an April 25 game against the Buffalo Blues in which he pitched all 14 innings of a 2–1 triumph. He had only a 1–3 record in May, though the victory was a shutout of the Pittsburgh team (now known as the Rebels) on May 18. His sacrifice fly against Pete Henning of the Packers contributed a run on June 25 in a 6–1 victory.

With the Peppers in the pennant race, Kaiserling pitched in 14 games in September. Only six were starts, but he pitched in games on back-to-back days on four separate occasions. He allowed just two hits on September 19 in a 4–0 shutout of the Packers, one day after taking the loss to them in relief. His record hovered around .500 all year, but on October 3, in his last start of the season, he gave up seven runs (six earned) to the Baltimore Terrapins, falling to 14–15 with the loss. Newark finished the season with 80 wins, 72 losses, and 3 ties, only good enough for fifth place in the league but a mere six games behind the pennant-winning Chicago Whales.

In 41 games (29 starts) for the Peppers, Kaiserling had 75 strikeouts and 73 walks in 261 1/3 innings. His 2.24 ERA, described by Russo as "stingy", was good for seventh in the league. Kaiserling's 3.0 WAR was tenth among Federal League pitchers, his five shutouts were tied with seven others for fourth, and his 0.034 home runs per nine innings pitched was decimal points behind Eddie Plank's similar total.

=== Later minor league career (1916–1917) ===
==== Toledo Iron Men (1916) ====
The Federal League ceased operations after the 1915 season. The rights to Kaiserling and many of the other players were made available for AL and NL teams to bid on, but none of these organizations acquired him. Various reports tied Kaiserling to the Indianapolis Indians and the Detroit Tigers, but it was the Toledo Iron Men of the American Association who signed him on March 7, 1916. Pitching their second game of the season on April 19, Kaiserling picked up the victory in a 3–1 triumph over the Milwaukee Brewers. He also won his last start, besting pennant-winning Louisville by a 9–2 score on September 30. In 36 games, Kaiserling had a 10–13 record in 240 innings pitched for sixth-place Toledo.

==== Chattanooga Lookouts (1917) ====
Kaiserling was acquired by the Chattanooga Lookouts of the Class AA Southern Association in 1917. However, he was forced to give up pitching after contracting tuberculosis. He died of the disease in Steubenville on March 2, 1918, at the age of 24. Kaiserling was buried at the city's Union Cemetery two days later.

== Physical appearance and playing style ==
Kaiserling was 6 feet 0 inches (1.83 m) tall and weighed 175 pounds (79 kg). Strongly built, he looked older than he was. He threw right-handed, batting the same way.

The South Bend Tribune nicknamed Kaiserling the "King of the Spitball" while he was with the Benders. Phillips was impressed with how Kaiserling could throw the spitball and the knuckleball. Using these, Kaiserling could fool the hitters as they tried to guess where his pitches would end up. However, Phillips also said in 1914 that Kaiserling needed to better exploit the hitters' weaknesses and keep base runners from getting too large a lead on the base paths. He thought experience would aid Kaiserling in these areas.
