= Illinois–Missouri League =

American minor baseball league

- Classification: Class D (1908–1914)
- Sport: Minor League Baseball
- First season: 1908
- Folded: 1914
- President: A. E. Blain (1908–19110); R.E. Rollins (1911); Charles A. Cline (1912–1914)
- No. of teams: 17
- Country: United States of America
- Most titles: 2 Lincoln Abes (1912–1913)
- Related competitions: Central Association

The Illinois–Missouri League was an American minor league baseball league. The Class D league began operations in 1908, and continued through 1914 with teams located in Illinois and Missouri. The Lincoln Abes won consecutive league titles in 1912–1913. Baseball Hall of Fame members Grover Cleveland Alexander (1909 Galesburg Boosters) and Ray Schalk (1911 Taylorville Christians) are league alumni.

== Cities represented: 1908–1914 ==
- Beardstown, IL: Beardstown Infants (1909–1910)
- Canton, IL: Canton Chinks (1908–1911); Canton Highlanders (1912); Canton Chinks (1913)
- Champaign, IL & Urbana, IL: Champaign-Urbana Velvets (1911); Champaign Velvets (1912–1914)
- Clinton, IL: Clinton Champs (1910–1912)
- Galesburg, IL: Galesburg Hornets (1908); Galesburg Boosters (1909)
- Hannibal, MO: Hannibal Cannibals (1908), moved to Central Association
- Havana, IL: Havana Perfectos (1908)
- Jacksonville, IL: Jacksonville Jacks (1910)
- Kankakee, IL: Kankakee Kanks (1912–1914)
- LaSalle, IL: LaSalle Blue Sox (1914)
- Lincoln, IL: Lincoln Abes (1910–1914)
- Macomb, IL: Macomb Potters (1910)
- Monmouth, IL: Monmouth Browns (1908–1909), moved to Central Association
- Ottawa, IL: Ottawa Indians (1914)
- Pekin, IL: Pekin Celestials (1909–1913)
- Streator, IL: Streator Speedboys (1912); Streator Boosters (1913–1914)
- Taylorville, IL: Taylorville Christians (1911)

== Standings and statistics ==
1908 Illinois–Missouri League
The league was formed. Newly formed teams in Canton, Illinois, Galesburg, Illinois, Hannibal, Missouri, Havana, Illinois, Macomb, Illinois, and Monmouth, Illinois were the charter cities in the league.

| Team standings | W | L | PCT | GB | Managers |
|---|---|---|---|---|---|
| Hannibal Cannibals | 68 | 49 | .581 | – | Bert Hough |
| Macomb Potters | 66 | 53 | .555 | 3 | Jap Wagner |
| Havana Perfectos | 58 | 61 | .487 | 11 | Mike Sampson / Fred Kommers |
| Canton Chinks | 56 | 61 | .479 | 12 | Rodney Turner / Charles Murphy |
| Monmouth Browns | 55 | 62 | .470 | 13 | Robert Hyde / Charles Karnell |
| Galesburg Hornets | 50 | 67 | .427 | 18 | Clyde Horne / Andy Mueller; John Grogan / Jerry Smith |

Player statistics
| Player | Team | Stat | Tot | Player | Team | Stat | Tot |
|---|---|---|---|---|---|---|---|
| Fred Kommers | Havana | BA | .349 | Henry Rossback | Galesburg | W | 21 |
| Fred Kommers | Havana | Runs | 75 | Charles Fanning | Canton | SO | 200 |
| Fred Kommers | Havana | Hits | 153 | Curly Curtis | Macomb | Pct | .714; 15–6 |
| Fred Kommers | Havana | HR | 11 | | | | |

1909 Illinois–Missouri League
Hannibal left the to join the American Association. The Havana Perfectos folded. The Beardstown Infants and Pekin Celestials joined the league.

| Team Standings | W | L | PCT | GB | Managers |
|---|---|---|---|---|---|
| Monmouth Browns | 77 | 50 | .606 | – | Jack Corbett |
| Beardstown Infants | 77 | 52 | .597 | 1 | Harry Riggons |
| Pekin Celestials | 73 | 57 | .562 | 5½ | Doug Jeffries / Harry Horton; Walter Diehl |
| Macomb Potters | 63 | 67 | .485 | 15½ | Orville Wolfe |
| Canton Chinks | 51 | 79 | .392 | 27½ | Harry Lloyd |
| Galesburg Boosters | 47 | 83 | .362 | 31½ | W.C. Dithridge |

Player statistics
| Player | Team | Stat | Tot | Player | Team | Stat | Tot |
|---|---|---|---|---|---|---|---|
| Andy Lotshaw | Beardstown | BA | .329 | Homer Hargrove | Monmouth | W | 27 |
| Andy Lotshaw | Beardstown | Runs | 72 | Joe Jenkins | Pekin | W | 27 |
| Andy Lotshaw | Beardstown | Hits | 146 | Charles Fanning | Canton | SO | 249 |
| Cy Forsythe | Pekin | HR | 7 | Homer Hargrove | Monmouth | Pct | .750; 27–9 |
| Will Johnston | Monmouth | HR | 7 | | | | |
| Fred Johnson | Canton | HR | 7 | | | | |

1910 Illinois–Missouri League
The teams from Galesburg and Monmouth joined the Central Association. The Clinton Champs and Lincoln Abes joined the league. Beardstown moved to Jacksonville, Illinois on July 21, and folded with Macomb on August 17. schedule

| Team standings | W | L | PCT | GB | Managers |
|---|---|---|---|---|---|
| Pekin Celestials | 66 | 47 | .584 | – | William Hickey / Bill Dithridge |
| Clinton Champs | 58 | 57 | .504 | 9 | Monte McFarland / Claude Suttles; Charles Cline |
| Canton Chinks | 55 | 62 | .470 | 13 | Elmer Smith / M. McDonald |
| Lincoln Abes | 43 | 71 | .377 | 23½ | James Novacek / Bill Salliard |
| Macomb Potters | 50 | 43 | .538 | NA | Stewart |
| Beardstown Infants / Jacksonville Jacks | 44 | 36 | .550 | NA | Jack Corbett / Pants Rowland |

Beardstown (38–26) moved to Jacksonville July 21; Jacksonville disbanded August 17; Macomb disbanded August 17.

Player statistics
| Player | Team | Stat | Tot | Player | Team | Stat | Tot |
|---|---|---|---|---|---|---|---|
| Cy Forsythe | Pekin | BA | .380 | Joe Jenkins | Pekin | W | 27 |
| Walter Diehl; Charles O'Berta | Pekin; Macomb/Lincoln | Runs | 72; 72 | Joe Jenkins | Pekin | SO | 242 |
| Will Lindberg | Clinton | Hits | 138 | Joe Jenkins | Pekin | Pct | .771; 27–8 |
| Al Dean | Pekin/Clinton | HR | 5 | | | | |

1911 Illinois–Missouri League
New teams in Champaign-Urbana Velvets and Taylorville Christians joined the league. schedule

| Team standings | W | L | PCT | GB | Managers |
|---|---|---|---|---|---|
| Clinton Champs | 74 | 55 | .574 | – | Claude Suttles |
| Pekin Celestials | 72 | 55 | .567 | 1 | Jack Herbert |
| Champaign-Urbana Velvets | 66 | 60 | .524 | 6½ | John Thiery / Fred Donovan |
| Canton Chinks | 60 | 62 | .492 | 10½ | Fred "Blackie" Wilson |
| Lincoln Abes | 59 | 64 | .480 | 12 | Conley / Bill Salliard / James Brady / Charles Vaught; Jack Corbett |
| Taylorville Christians | 47 | 82 | .364 | 27 | Fred Donovan / Joe Adams; R.M. "Oscar" Denney |

Player statistics
| Player | Team | Stat | Tot | Player | Team | Stat | Tot |
|---|---|---|---|---|---|---|---|
| Andy Lotshaw | Canton | BA | .355 | Joab McManus | Canton | W | 32 |
| Will Lindberg | Clinton | Runs | 94 | Joab McManus | Canton | SO | 243 |
| Andy Lotshaw | Canton | Hits | 160 | Fred Marks | Clinton | Pct | .727; 24–9 |
| Andy Lotshaw | Canton | HR | 29 | | | | |

1912 Illinois–Missouri League
Taylorville folded. The Streator Speedboys joined the league. The Champaign–Urbana Velvets changed their name to the Champaign Velvets. Clinton moved to Kankakee, Illinois on May 16 with a 2–5 record; thereafter, they went 54–51 as the Kankakee Kanks. schedule

| Team standings | W | L | PCT | GB | Managers |
|---|---|---|---|---|---|
| Lincoln Abes | 70 | 47 | .598 | – | Louis Ehrgott |
| Pekin Celestials | 61 | 55 | .526 | 8½ | Jack Herbert |
| Canton Highlanders | 57 | 56 | .504 | 11 | Unknown |
| Clinton Champs / Kankakee Kanks | 56 | 56 | .500 | 11½ | Claude Suttles / Fred "Blackie" Wilson |
| Champaign Velvets | 53 | 64 | .453 | 17 | Chuck Fleming |
| Streator Speedboys | 46 | 65 | .414 | 21 | Jack Leuter |

Player statistics
| Player | Team | Stat | Tot | Player | Team | Stat | Tot |
|---|---|---|---|---|---|---|---|
| Polly Wolfe | Lincoln | BA | .374 | Clarence Vaught | Lincoln | W | 22 |
| Polly Wolfe | Lincoln | Runs | 89 | Fred Witte | Champaign | SO | 211 |
| Polly Wolfe | Lincoln | Hits | 164 | N. Entrich | Champaign | Pct | .786; 11–3 |
| Andy Lotshaw | Canton | HR | 11 | | | | |

1913 Illinois–Missouri League
Canton and Pekin folded on July 10, before the end of the season. The league instituted a split–season schedule. The playoff system developed in which the best record of the first–half of the season would play the best record of the second–half of the season. schedule

| Team standings | W | L | PCT | GB | Managers |
|---|---|---|---|---|---|
| Lincoln Abes | 57 | 26 | .686 | – | Louis Ehrgott |
| Champaign Velvets | 53 | 32 | .623 | 5 | Fred "Blackie" Wilson |
| Kankakee Kanks | 35 | 51 | .407 | 23½ | Red Kelly |
| Streator Boosters | 30 | 57 | .345 | 29 | Bob Coyle / Nick Kahl |
| Pekin Celestials# | 23 | 26 | .469 | NA | Jack Herbert |
| Canton Chinks | 20 | 26 | .435 | NA | Ted Raines |

Playoff: Lincoln won the first half, Lincoln & Champaign tied for the second half. Lincoln was awarded the championship when Champaign refused to play off the second half tie.

Player statistics
| Player | Team | Stat | Tot | Player | Team | Stat | Tot |
|---|---|---|---|---|---|---|---|
| Fred Dang | Lincoln | BA | .412 | Clarence Vaught | Lincoln | W | 21 |
| Dick Higgins | Lincoln | Runs | 65 | Clarence Vaught | Lincoln | SO | 166 |
| A.J. Holtzhouser | Kankakee | Hits | 118 | Ernest Hook | Lincoln | Pct | .889; 16–2 |
| Roy Phillips | Streator | HR | 13 | | | | |

1914 Illinois–Missouri League
The LaSalle Blue Sox and Ottawa Indians formed and joined the league. Kankakee and Lincoln both folded on July 3, before the season ended. schedule

| Team standings | W | L | PCT | GB | Managers |
|---|---|---|---|---|---|
| Champaign Velvets | 62 | 27 | .696 | – | Fred "Blackie" Wilson |
| Ottawa Indians | 47 | 38 | .553 | 13 | Chuck Fleming |
| Streator Boosters | 40 | 48 | .454 | 21½ | John Ray / Heinie Seebach |
| LaSalle Blue Sox | 26 | 60 | .302 | 34½ | Tony Hinley / John Fitzpatrick |
| Lincoln Abes | 32 | 15 | .681 | NA | Louis Ehrgott |
| Kankakee Kanks | 14 | 33 | .301 | NA | Ted Raines / Harry Randall / Gene Connelly / William Hinley |

Lincoln & Kankakee disbanded July 3.
Ottawa and Streator left the league to join the Bi-State League. The teams in Champaign and LaSalle folded, and the league itself folded.

Player statistics
| Player | Team | Stat | Tot | Player | Team | Stat | Tot |
|---|---|---|---|---|---|---|---|
| Andy Lotshaw | Champaign-Urbana | BA | .320 | Grover Baichley | Champaign-Urbana | W | 15 |
| Chuck Fleming | Ottawa | Runs | 68 | Grover Baichley | Champaign-Urbana | SO | 174 |
| Andy Lotshaw | Champaign-Urbana | Hits | 108 | Grover Baichley | Champaign-Urbana | Pct | .938; 15–1 |
| Andy Lotshaw | Champaign-Urbana | HR | 10 | | | | |

== External references ==
- Sumner, Benjamin Barrett. Minor League Baseball Standings:All North American Leagues, Through 1999. Jefferson, N.C.:McFarland. ISBN 0-7864-0781-6
