= Aurora, Illinois, minor league baseball history =

Aurora, Illinois minor league baseball teams
- 1888–1915; (1888, 1890–1892, 1895, 1910–1912, 1915); Aurora, Illinois

Minor league affiliations
- Class: Independent (1888, 1890–1891) Class F (1892) Class B (1895) Class D (1910) Class C (1911–1912) Class D (1915)
- League: Interstate League (1888); Illinois-Iowa League (1890–1892); Western Interstate League (1895); Wisconsin-Illinois League (1910–1912); Bi-State League (1915)

Major league affiliations
- Team: None

Minor league titles
- League titles (1): 1907

Team data
- Name: Aurora (1888); Aurora Hoodoos (1890); Aurora Maroons (1891); Aurora Indians (1892); Aurora (1895); Aurora Islanders (1910); Aurora Blues (1911–1912); Aurora Foxes (1915)
- Ballpark: Driving Park (1890–1892); Hurds Island Park (1890–1891); Fox River Park (1910–1912, 1915)

Minor league baseball teams were based in Aurora, Illinois, in various seasons between 1888 and 1915.

Playing under numerous nicknames, Aurora teams played as members of the Interstate League in 1888, Illinois-Iowa League from 1890 to 1892, Western Interstate League in 1895, Wisconsin-Illinois League from 1910 to 1912 and Bi-State League in 1915, winning the 1907 league championship.

Baseball Hall of Fame member Casey Stengel played for the 1911 Aurora Blues, leading the Wisconsin-Illinois League in hitting.

The Aurora teams hosted home minor league games at the Driving Park, Hurds Island Park and Fox River Park.

== History ==
Aurora first hosted a minor league baseball team when the Aurora team played as members of the 1888 Interstate League. Playing in the four–team league with Aurora were the Bloomington Reds, Peoria Reds and Terre Haute Hoosiers. The league records and 1888 standings are unknown.

Aurora rejoined minor league baseball play when the 1890 Aurora Hoodoos joined the Illinois-Iowa League, an Independent league. Aurora played their home games at both the Driving Park and Hurds Island Park. The Hoodoos finished the 1890 season with a 52–54 record, placing fifth in the eight–team league under manager Tim Manning. Aurora finished 13½ games behind the first place Ottumwa Coal Palace Kings in the final standings.

In 1891, the Aurora Maroons continued play in the Illinois-Iowa League, but disbanded during the season. On June 17, 1891, the Maroons had a record of 11–27 when the franchise disbanded. Aurora was managed by Harry Smith, Ed Wiswell and Tim Manning. After Aurora folded, Tim Manning became manager of the league member Joliet Giants, leading them to a second-place finish.

Aurora briefly rejoined the 1892 Class F level Illinois-Iowa League before disbanding. After beginning the season without a team, the Peoria Distillers relocated to Aurora on May 31, 1892, and became the Aurora Indians. The 1892 team had a 17–8 record in Peoria and a 9–19 record in Aurora, playing under manager Mike Trost in both locations. The Aurora Indians disbanded on July 5, 1892, with a 26–27 overall record.

In 1895, Aurora played as members of the Class B level Western Interstate League. Aurora finished the season with a 2–12 record and in fourth place playing under manager William McDowell. Aurora was 8½ games behind first place Terre Haute Hottentots in the final standings. The league began the season with six teams and ended the season playing with four. The Western Interstate League folded after the 1895 season.

After a fifteen–year absence, Aurora became members on the 1910 Wisconsin-Illinois League, a Class D level league, beginning play at Fox River Park. The Aurora Islanders finished with a 43–81 record under managers Snapper Kennedy and Edward Jacobson, placing eighth and last in the eight–team league. The Islanders finished 33.0 games behind the champion Appleton Papermakers.

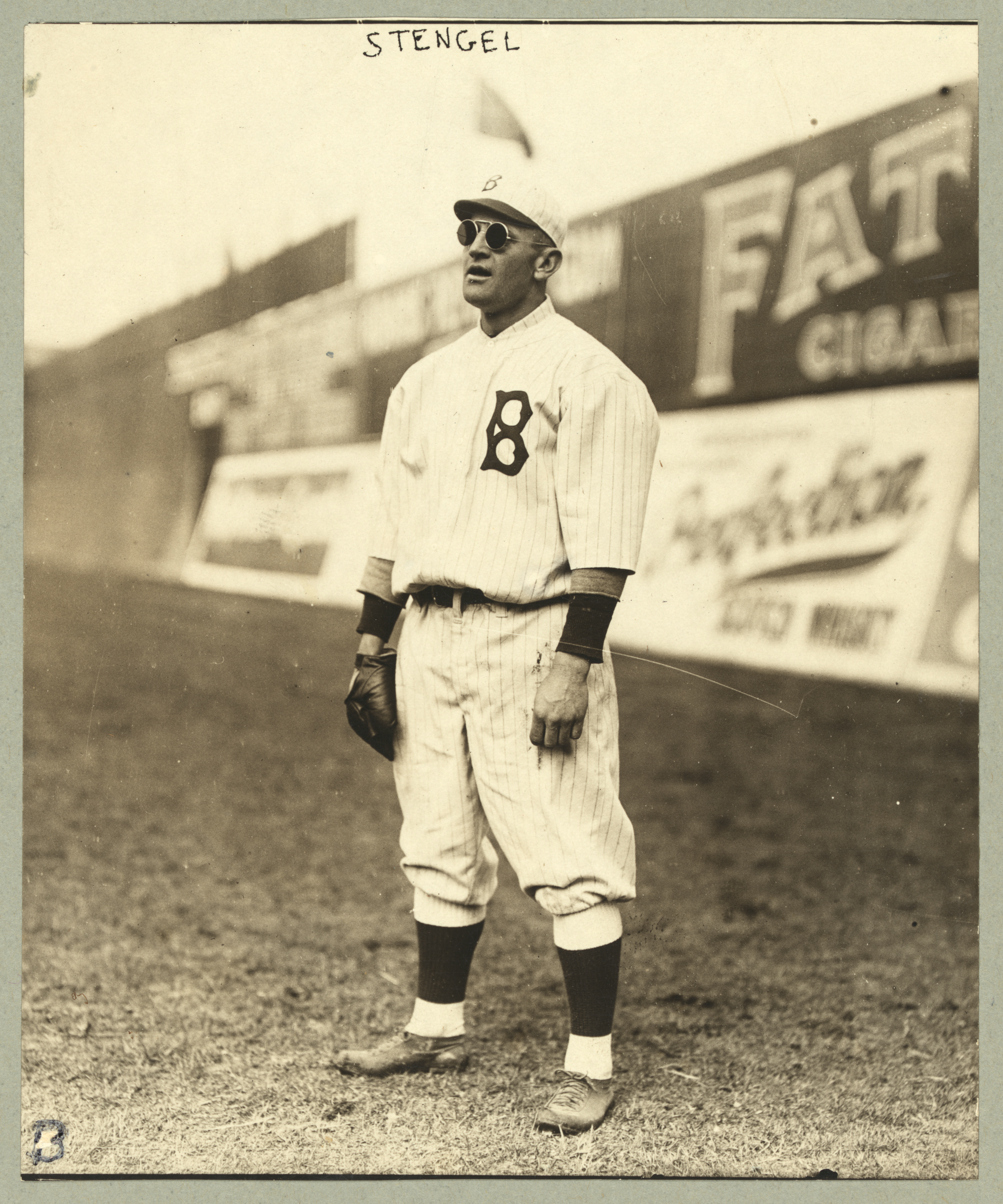
(1915) Baseball Hall of Fame member Casey Stengel, Brooklyn Dodgers. Stengel won the league batting title while playing for Aurora in 1912.

The 1911 Aurora Blues continued play in the Wisconsin–Illinois League as the league became a Class C level league in 1911. The Blues finished with a record of 56–57 record and in seventh place. Playing under manager Al Tebeau, the Blues finished 20.0 games behind the first place Rockford Wolverines in the final standings. On May 18, 1911, Earl Daniels, pitching for Aurora threw a no-hitter in a 2–0 victory over the Green Bay Bays. Daniels' Blues teammate Len Madden also threw a no–hitter over the Green Bay Bays in 1911, defeating them 3–0 on August 4, 1911. Future Hall of Fame member Casey Stengel played for Aurora in 1911. Stengel won the Wisconsin-Illinois League batting title, hitting .352, while adding 50 Stolen bases and 27 outfield assists.

Aurora manager Al Tebeau was instrumental in bringing Casey Stengel to the 1911 Aurora Blues, having ties to the Kansas City Blues, Stengel's hometown team. Tabeau previously ran a saloon and hotel in Montgomery, Illinois, becoming a manager of the baseball franchise in Joliet, Illinois before moving to the Aurora Blues. Stengel had been assigned to the Aurora Blues after trying out for their counterpart, the Kansas City Blues. This, after Stengel had begun his professional career in playing for the Kankakee Kays, Shelbyville Grays and Maysville Rivermen in 1910. Brooklyn Dodgers scout Larry Sutton took a train from nearby Chicago to see Stengel play for Aurora on numerous occasions, eventually signing Stengel to a contract. Stengel made his major league debut in 1912.

The Aurora use of the "Blues" moniker reportedly corresponded with the color of the team uniforms. The earlier use "Maroons" moniker was said to have been adopted under the same circumstance.

In 1912, the Aurora Blues continued play and placed seventh. The Blues ended the season with a record of 54–80 in the Wisconsin–Illinois League standings, playing under managers Guy Dickey and Tom Asmussen. Aurora finished 34.0 games behind the first place Oshkosh Indians in the final standings. The Aurora franchise folded after the 1912 season, replaced by the Milwaukee Creams franchise in the 1913 Wisconsin-Illinois League.

In Aurora's final season of minor league play, the 1915 Aurora Foxes became members of the six–team Class D level Bi-State League. The Foxes had a 25–27 record and were in fourth place under manager Clarence Marshall, when the team disbanded on July 5, 1915. The Foxes were 7.0 games behind the first place Streator Boosters, as the entire Bi-State League disbanded on July 7, 1915. The league disbanded because the neighboring Elgin Watch Makers franchise had joined Aurora in disbanding on July 5, 1915, and the league could not continue without the two teams.

Aurora has not hosted another minor league franchise.

== The ballparks ==
The Aurora minor league teams first hosted home games at Driving Park. Aurora teams played at the ballpark from 1890 to 1892, likely playing Sunday games at the ballpark. The Driving Park later became known as Aurora Downs. The ballpark was located between Pennsylvania Avenue and Lake Street (Route 31) in Aurora, Illinois.

In 1890 and 1891, Aurora was noted to also have played some home games at Hurds Island Park. The ballpark, which also hosted football games, was located on Hurds Island, which lies on the Fox River.

Aurora minor league teams reportedly played home games at Fox River Park in the seasons from 1910 to 1915. First called Riverview Park, the site contained an amusement park and became known as Fox River Park in 1910. The baseball park was located at the south end of the park.

== Timeline ==
Year(s)	# Yrs.	Team	Level	League	Ballpark
1888	1	Aurora	Independent	Interstate League	Driving Park
1890	1	Aurora Hoodoos	Independent	Illinois-Iowa League	Driving Park
1891	1	Aurora Maroons	Independent	Illinois-Iowa League	Driving Park
1892	1	Aurora Indians	Class F	Illinois-Iowa League	Driving Park
1895	1	Aurora	Class B	Western Interstate League	Hurd Island Park
1910	1	Aurora Islanders	Class D	Wisconsin-Illinois League	Fox River Park
1911–1912	2	Aurora Blues	Class C	Wisconsin-Illinois League	Fox River Park
1915	1	Aurora Foxes	Class D	Bi-State League	Fox River Park

== Year-by-year records ==
Year	Record	Place	Manager	Playoffs/notes
1888	00–00	NA	NA	1888 records unknown
1890	52–54	5th	Tim Manning	No playoffs held
1891	11–27	NA	Harry Smith / Ed Wiswell; Tim Manning	Team disbanded July 17
1892	26–27	NA	Mike Trost	Moved from Peoria May 31; Team disbanded July 5
1895	2–12	4th	William McDowell	No playoffs held
1910	43–81	8th	Snapper Kennedy / Edward Jacobson	No playoffs held
1911	56–57	7th	Al Tebeau	No playoffs held
1912	54–80	7th	Guy Dickey / Tom Asmussen	No playoffs held
1915	24–26	5th	Clarence Mitchell	League disbanded July 7

== Notable alumni ==
- Casey Stengel (1911) Inducted Baseball Hall of Fame, 1966
- Tom Asmussen (1912, MGR)
- Kirtley Baker (1891)
- Warren Wallace Beckwith (1895)
- Gus Creely (1891)
- Billy Crowell (1890)
- Frank Donnelly (1892)
- Danny Friend (1890)
- Bo Hanley (1911)
- Hunkey Hines (1890)
- John Houseman (1892)
- Bumpus Jones (1890-1891)
- Snapper Kennedy (1910, MGR)
- Bob Langsford (1892)
- Harry Mace (1892)
- Len Madden (1911)
- Tim Manning (1890-1891, MGR)
- Al Mays (1892)
- Frank Millard (1890)
- Billy Murray (1892)
- Parson Nicholson (1892)
- Chick Pedroes (1890)
- Charlie Pickett (1915)
- Cy Pieh (1912)
- Crazy Schmit (1891)
- Mike Trost (1892, MGR)

== See also ==
- Aurora Blues players
- Aurora Indians players
- Aurora Islanders players
- Aurora Maroons players
- Aurora (minor league) players
