= Gus Williams (outfielder) =

American baseball player (1888–1964)

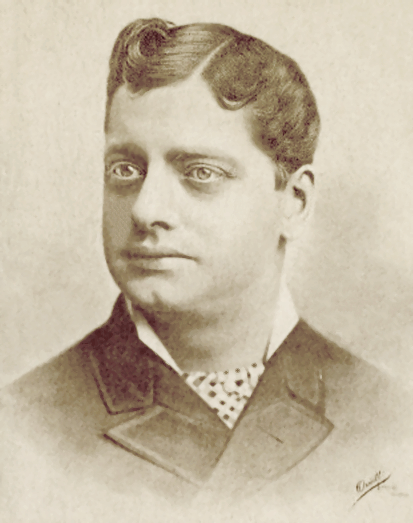
- Williams as a member of the St. Louis Browns, c. 1911–15.
- Outfielder
- Born: May 7, 1888; Omaha, Nebraska, U.S.
- Died: April 16, 1964 (aged 75); Sterling, Illinois, U.S.
- Batted: Left Threw: Left

MLB debut
- April 12, 1911, for the St. Louis Browns

Last MLB appearance
- June 18, 1915, for the St. Louis Browns

MLB statistics
- Batting average: .263
- Home runs: 12
- Runs batted in: 147
- Stats at Baseball Reference

Former teams
- Lincoln Railsplitters (minor league) (1909); Monmouth Browns (minor league) (1909–1910)

Teams
- St. Louis Browns (1911–1915)

August Joseph Williams Jr. (May 7, 1888 – April 16, 1964), known also as "Gloomy" Gus Williams, was an American professional baseball player whose career spanned 10 seasons, five of which were spent in Major League Baseball (MLB) with the St. Louis Browns (1911–1915). Over his major league career, Williams batted .263 with 171 runs scored, 367 hits, 58 doubles, 31 triples, 12 home runs, 147 runs batted in (RBIs), and 95 stolen bases in 410 games played.

Williams career started out in 1909 with the Monmouth Browns of the Class-D Illinois–Missouri League. After playing in the minor leagues for two seasons, Williams made his major league debut in 1911. He had another stint in the majors in 1912. In 1913, Williams served as the Browns regular outfielder. He was a dead-ball era power hitter for the Browns, ranking in the top-10 amongst American League hitters in home runs during the 1913 and 1914 seasons. He led the league in strikeouts in 1914. Williams would make his last appearance in the major leagues during the 1915 season. He would go on to play in the minors with the Toronto Maple Leafs (1915), Nashville Volunteers (1916), Louisville Colonels (1917), and Indianapolis Indians (1918). In the minors, he compiled a career batting average of .293 with 838 hits in 759 games played. Williams also played semi-professional baseball after leaving the professional circuit. He batted and threw left-handed. During his baseball career, Williams stood at 6 feet (180 cm) and weighed 185 pounds (84 kg).

== Early life ==
Gus Williams was born on May 7, 1888, in Omaha, Nebraska, to August Sr. and Clara Williams of Indiana and Illinois, respectively. The two had four other children, Frank, Ross, Reed, and Weston. August Williams Sr., whose parents hailed from Germany, was a fire chief in Omaha. Gus Williams had five siblings; sisters Mamie, Carie, Louisa, and Theresia; and brother Harry. Harry would go on to play two seasons with the New York Yankees (1913–14). For much of his adolescent life, he worked in a meat packing plant in Omaha. In 1908, Williams tried out with the Lincoln Railsplitters as a pitcher. He was turned away from their training camp after he was too "wild". Later in 1908, he signed with the minor league Marion Diggers of the Class-D Ohio State League, again as a pitcher. However, Williams joined a semi-professional league and did not play with the Marion club.

== Professional career ==
=== Early minor league career (1909–1910) ===
In 1909, Williams signed with the minor league Lincoln Railsplitters, who he had tried out with a year before. Lincoln then farmed Williams out to the Monmouth Browns of the Class-D Illinois–Missouri League from 1909–1910. He was used as a pitcher for the Browns until June when manager John Corbett converted Williams to an outfielder. In September, a scout from the St. Louis Browns saw Williams play and reported back to the team's management that they should sign him. He was drafted later that month by the Browns in Major League Baseball's (MLB) rule 5 draft. The Browns had to pay Monmouth US$300 in accordance with the draft, but the Lincoln club contested the transaction, since Williams's contract was still owned by the Railsplitters. The National Commission ruled that Lincoln should receive the compensation from the Browns, since Williams was still under contract with them. Williams finished the season with the Monmouth club. He compiled a .327 batting average with 64 hits, 10 doubles, 15 triples, and two home runs. Williams finished the season first in the Illinois–Missouri League in slugging percentage (.555), tied for first in triples, and fourth in batting average.

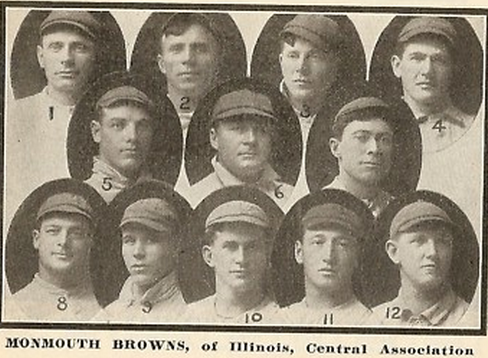
Williams (labeled 2) was a member of the 1910 Monmouth Browns.

Williams again played with the Monmouth Browns in 1910, who were now members of the Class-D Central Association. In July, as a member of the Monmouth club, Williams hit a home run during an exhibition game against the MLB Chicago Cubs, which ended in the Cubs favor by a score of 5–to–4. By the end of the season, Williams had compiled a .290 batting average with 138 hits, 30 doubles, 11 triples, and seven home runs in 128 games played. Amongst league batters, he was second in triples, third in total bases (211), and fourth in slugging percentage (.443). After the season, the St. Louis Browns stated their intent for Williams to make his MLB debut during the 1911 season.

=== St. Louis Browns (1911–1915) ===
During spring training in 1911, Williams played with the St. Louis Browns. He made his MLB debut on April 12, against the Cleveland Naps. In that game, he had three hits, which included two doubles, in three at-bats. With the Browns that season, he batted .269 with one run scored, seven hits, three doubles, and four runs batted in (RBIs) in nine games played. He was assigned to the Omaha Rourkes of the Class-A Western League in mid-May. In July, Williams was benched due to poor play. The Lincoln Evening News stated that Williams had trouble hitting curveballs. On the season, Williams batted .303 with 149 hits 26 doubles, 15 triples, and 10 home runs in 128 games played. He was third in the league in home runs; and was tied for fifth in triples, and slugging percentage (.478).

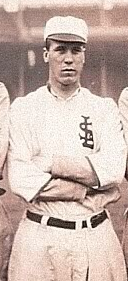
Williams broke into the majors in 1911, playing with the St. Louis Browns until the 1915 season.

Williams joined the Montgomery Rebels of the Class-A Southern Association at the start of the 1912 season. On June 17, Williams quit the Montgomery club after he stated it was too hot to play baseball in the area. He returned to his home-town of Omaha, where he played during the 1911 season where he asked the team for a contract. John Dobbs, the president of the Rebels telegraphed Williams at his home in Omaha that Montgomery would raise his salary if he returned to the team. However, Williams stated he did not want to return to the Montgomery team that season. In 57 games played with the Rebels that season, he batted .286 with 54 hits. Williams joined the St. Louis Browns in July. Williams made his MLB season debut on July 27, against the New York Highlanders. In that game, he got one hit, a double, in three at-bats. In August, Williams replaced Heinie Jantzen as the Browns every-day outfielder. Williams's first career MLB home run came on September 27, against Chicago White Sox pitcher Frank Lange. During the next game on September 28, Williams hit his second career home run, also against Frank Lange. On the season, he batted .292 with 32 runs scored, 63 hits, 13 doubles, seven triples, two home runs, 32 RBIs, and 18 stolen bases in 64 games played.

In 1913, Williams played his first full season in the majors. During spring training that season, he reportedly exceeded the expectations of St. Louis Browns manager George Stovall. In May, a syndicated column "Ball and Bat Notes" had a section calling Williams "one of the best fielders in the country". Williams batted .273 with 72 runs scored, 147 hits, 21 doubles, 16 triples, five home runs, 51 RBIs, and 31 stolen bases in 148 games played. Amongst American League batters, Williams was second in strikeouts (87); tied for fourth with Ty Cobb in triples; tied for fifth with Rube Oldring, and Danny Moeller in home runs; tied for sixth with Oldring in at-bats per home runs (107.6), and eighth in extra base hits (42).

"Take a look at Gus Williams of the St. Louis Browns. He is the sort of batter fans like to see step to the plate, for when he hits hard, and the ball goes a long distance if he lands on it. Gus specializes in extra base hits. Bunting does not interest him very much. He wants to see how far the ball will go, and he swings at it with all his might. Once he gets to first Williams has an ambition to continue moving, and he is one of the ten best base stealers in the American League."

—American Press Association: September 11, 1914

Williams re-signed with the St. Louis Browns in March 1914. The Browns feared that Williams would sign with a Federal League team, since it was reported in February that he was in talks with the Kansas City Packers, however he continued his tenure with St. Louis. Williams led the American League in batting average until the beginning of June. At one point in the season, Williams was sustaining a .452 batting average, with Sam Crawford, and Shoeless Joe Jackson trailing behind that. On June 26, The Washington Post reported that Williams hit one of the longest home runs ever at Sportsman's Park. Sportswriter Charles Bartlett stated that St. Louis manager Branch Rickey was the reason for Williams success that year, writing: "Branch Rickey is the man who made a star of Gus Williams. Who ever heard of [Williams] playing the brand of ball he's been exhibiting this year". In July, Williams went into a slump, causing manager Rickey to position him at the sixth spot in the Browns batting order. On the season, Williams batted .253 with 51 runs scored, 126 hits, 19 doubles, six triples, four home runs, 47 RBIs, and 35 stolen bases. He led American League hitters in strikeouts that season (120). Williams was also tied for seventh with Howie Shanks, Marty Kavanagh, Tris Speaker, and Jimmy Walsh in home runs; and tied for ninth with Donie Bush, and Ty Cobb in stolen bases.

In late-February 1915, Williams re-signed with the St. Louis Browns, and reported to their spring training in Texas. Browns manager Branch Rickey stated before the start of the season that he expected Williams to have a more productive season then 1914. The Kingston Daily Freeman called Williams the "best bad ball player" that season. With St. Louis that season, he batted .202 with 15 runs scored, 24 hits, two doubles, two triples, one home run, 11 RBIs, and 11 stolen bases in 45 games played. He made his last MLB appearance on June 18.

=== Later career (1915–1918) ===
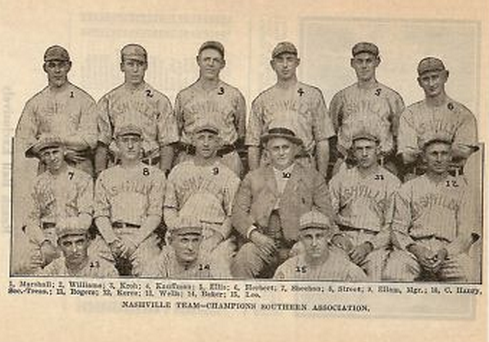
Williams (labeled 2) signed with the Nashville Volunteers in 1916, leading them to the Southern Association Championship that year.

On August 21, 1915, the St. Louis Browns traded Williams to the minor league Toronto Maple Leafs of the Double-A International League in exchange for a pitcher to be named later. On the season with Toronto, Williams batted .285 with 97 hits, 15 doubles, nine triples, and eight home runs in 90 games played. He finished the seasons fifth in the International League in home runs. After the season, Williams wrote Rowdy Elliott, the manager of the Oakland Oaks, requesting a chance to try out for the team. Elliott said that he was not interested in another left-handed hitter, as he already had outfielders Rube Gardner and Robert Middleton, who were also left-handed. Before the start of the 1916 season, Williams signed with the Nashville Volunteers of the Class-A Southern Association. The Volunteers won the Southern Association Championship that year. As a member of the winning team, Williams received a cash reward, and supply of cake from a local Atlanta bakery. With the Volunteers, he batted .298 with 156 hits, 33 doubles, 13 triples, and five home runs in 138 games played. Williams led the league in doubles, was second in hits, tied for second with Joe Harris in total bases (230), and tied for third with Ham Hyatt in triples.

At the end of the 1916 season, Williams was selected by the Double-A Louisville Colonels of the American Association in the minor league draft. He played the entire 1917 season with the Colonels, batting .279 with 161 hits, 29 doubles, 24 triples, and seven home runs in 148 games played. Williams led the American Association in triples; was fifth in doubles; and tied for fifth with Dave Altizer, Johnny Beall, Ray Demmitt, Cozy Dolan, and Fred Nicholson in home runs. After the season, Louisville traded Williams, along with Red Corriden, to the Indianapolis Indians, who like the Colonels were members of the American Association. Williams batted in the lead-off spot in the Indians batting order. He primarily played right field for the Indians. The Indians were in talks with the St. Louis Cardinals to send Williams back to the majors, but negotiations fell through, resulting in him staying in Indianapolis. On the season, Williams batted .279 with 19 hits, four doubles, and three triples in 17 games played. That season would prove to be his last in professional baseball.

== Later life ==
In July 1918, Williams signed with the semi-professional Allegheny Steel team, based out of Pittsburgh. By 1930, Williams was living in Sterling, Illinois, with his wife Hazel, and their two daughters. Williams and his wife worked out of their own office as chiropractors. In 1942, Williams was working for a Stewart Warner in Sterling. Williams died on April 16, 1964, at the age of 75 in Sterling. He was buried at Calvary Cemetery in Sterling.
