= Monmouth, Illinois, minor league baseball history =

Monmouth, Illinois minor league baseball history
- 1889–1913; (1889–1890, 1908–1913); Monmouth, Illinois

Minor league affiliations
- Class: Independent (1889–1890); Class D (1908–1913)
- League: Central Interstate League (1889); Illinois-Iowa League (1890); Illinois-Missouri League (1908–1909); Central Association (1910–1913)

Major league affiliations
- Team: None

Minor league titles
- League titles (1): 1909

Team data
- Name: Monmouth (1889); Monmouth Maple Cities (1890); Monmouth Browns (1908–1913)
- Ballpark: 11th Street Park (1908–1913)

Minor league baseball teams were based in Monmouth, Illinois in various seasons between 1889 and 1913. Monmouth teams played as members of the Central Interstate League in 1889, Illinois-Iowa League in 1890, Illinois-Missouri League from 1908 to 1909 and Central Association from 1910 to 1913. Monmouth won the 1909 Illinois-Missouri League championship and hosted home games at the 11th Street Park.

== History ==
Semi–pro and amateur baseball was popular in Monmouth, with early baseball teams playing in various leagues. In 1888, the Monmouth Athletic Association was incorporated and designed to support local baseball efforts.

Mommouth first hosted minor league baseball in 1889. Monmouth fielded a team in the 1889 Central Interstate League, consisting of Indiana, Illinois and Iowa teams. The league featured the Burlington Babies, Davenport Hawkeyes, Evansville Hoosiers, Peoria Canaries, Quincy Black Birds and Springfield Senators, who joined Monmouth in the eight–team league. The standings and statistics for 1889 are unknown.

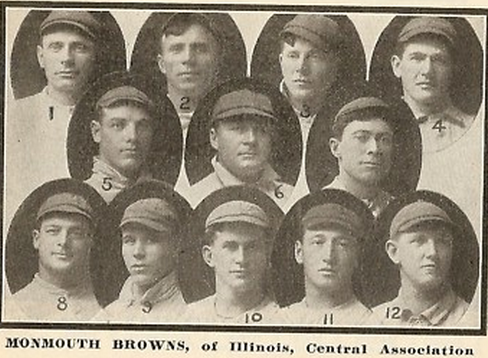
1910 Monmouth Browns

In 1890 the Monmouth Maple Cities joined the new Illinois-Iowa League as a charter member. Monmouth began play along with the Aurora Hoodoos, Cedar Rapids Blackbirds, Dubuque Giants, Joliet Convicts, Ottawa Pirates, Ottumwa Coal Palaces and Sterling Blue Coats. The league did not allow Sunday games. Monmouth placed 2nd with a 64–48 record in 1890, finishing 4.5 games behind 1st place Ottumwa, playing under manager John Halpin. The Monmouth franchise folded from the league after the 1890 season and were replaced in the eight–team league by the Quincy Ravens in 1891.

In 1908, the Monmouth Browns were founded. The Browns joined the newly formed Class D level Illinois-Missouri League as charter members. Monmouth Mayor John S. Brown was instrumental in the forming of the Illinois–Missouri League and the Monmouth use of the "Browns" team moniker was in tribute to John Brown.

The Monmouth Browns finished with a 55–62 record to place fifth in the 1908 Illinois-Missouri League. The Browns were managed by Robert Hyde and Charles Karnell. Other charter members of the 1908 six–team league were the Canton Chinks (56–61), Galesburg Hornets (50–67), Hannibal Cannibals (68–49), Havana Perfectors (58–61) and Macomb Potters (66–53). Mommouth finished 13.0 games behind first place Hannibal in the final standings.

The Monmouth Browns captured the 1909 Illinois-Missouri League Championship with Gus Williams, an outfielder, as a batting league leader (with Williams being among the league batting leaders again in 1910 also playing for Monmouth). Managed by Jack Corbett, the Monmouth Browns placed first in the Illinois-Missouri League with a 77–50 record in the six–team league. The Browns finished 1.0 game ahead of the second place Beardstown Infants as the league had no playoffs following the regular seasons. Monmouth drew 23,000 for the season, 362 per game. On September 19, 1909, Browns pitcher Notley Jones threw a no–hitter in a 2–0 victory over the Galesburg Boosters.

In 1910, the Monmouth Browns left the Illinois–Missouri League after winning the championship to become members of the eight–team Class D level Central Association. Monmouth finished with a record of 62–72, placing sixth in 1910. Monmouth played alongside the Burlington Pathfinders (56–81), Galesburg Pavers (69–67), Hannibal Cannibals (77–60), Keokuk Indians (67–70), Kewanee Boilermakers (49–91), Ottumwa Packers (80–57) and Quincy Vets (88–50) in league play. Monmouth was managed by Lew Drill in 1910 and finished 24.0 games behind the first place Quincy Vets in the final standings. Season attendance for the Monmouth Browns was 25,000.

Monmouth placed sixth and finished with a 59–69 record in the 1911 Central Association. The Browns were managed by Claude Stark and finished 28.0 games behind the Ottumwa Speedboys.

In 1912, the Monmouth Browns finished with a 71–55 record, placing fourth under managers Bert Hough, Jack Corbett and R.L. Noven. Finishing 6½ games behind the first place Ottumwa Speedboys in the Central Association standings. Monmouth drew 18,000 fans in 1912, an average of 286 per game.

In their final season, the 1913 Monmouth Browns placed third in the eight–team Central Association final standings. Monmouth ended the season with a 64–62 record, playing under manager Bert Hough. The Browns finished 8.0 games behind the first place Ottumwa Packers. The Monmouth franchise permanently folded after the 1913 season.

Monmouth, Illinois has not hosted another minor league team.

== The ballpark ==
The Monmouth Browns were noted to have played minor league home games at 11th Street Park from 1908 to 1913. The ballpark was built by the city of Monmouth in 1907, spearheaded by Mayor John S. Brown. The ballpark was located in the 700 block of 11th Street, along the rail line. Today, the site houses the Birchwood Apartments.

== Timeline ==
Year(s)	# Yrs.	Team	Level	League
1889	1	Monmouth	Independent	Central Interstate League
1890	1	Monmouth Maple Cities	Independent	Illinois-Iowa League
1908–1910	3	Monmouth Browns	Class D	Illinois-Missouri League
1913–1915	3	Monmouth Browns	Class D	Central Association

== Year–by–year record ==
Year(s)	Record	Place	Managers	Playoffs/Notes
1889	00–00	NA	NA	Stats unknown for 1889
1890	64–48	2nd	John Halpin	No playoffs held
1908	55–62	5th	Robert Hyde	No playoffs held
1909	77–50	1st	Jack Corbett	League champions
1910	62–72	6th	Lew Drill	No playoffs held
1911	59–69	6th	Claude Starke	No playoffs held
1912	71–55	4th	Bert Hough; Jack Corbett / R.L. Noven	No playoffs held
1913	64–62	3rd	Bert Hough	No playoffs held

== Notable alumni ==
- Dad Clark (1910)
- Fritz Clausen (1890)
- Bill Collins (1890)
- Gus Creely (1890)
- Billy Crowell (1890)
- Lew Drill (1910, MGR)
- Charlie Gessner (1889)
- Irv Higginbotham (1910)
- Bert Inks (1890)
- Bumpus Jones (1890)
- Lou Lowdermilk (1908)
- Moxie Meixell (1909)
- Gene Moriarty (1890)
- Dutch Schliebner (1913)
- Hosea Siner (1908–1910)
- Gus Williams (1909–1910)
- Bill Zies (1890)

== See also ==
- Monmouth Browns players
- Monmouth (minor league baseball) players
