= Grover Baichley =

American baseball player (1889-1956)

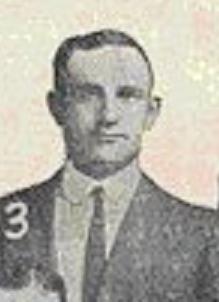
- Baichley with the Burlington Pathfinders, ca. 1916.
- Pitcher
- Born: December 10, 1889; Toledo, Illinois, U.S.
- Died: June 28, 1956 (aged 66); San Jose, California, U.S.
- Batted: Right Threw: Right

MLB debut
- August 24, 1914, for the St. Louis Browns

Last MLB appearance
- September 4, 1914, for the St. Louis Browns

MLB statistics
- Win–loss record: 0–0
- Earned run average: 5.14
- Strikeouts: 3
- Stats at Baseball Reference

Teams
- St. Louis Browns (1914)

Grover Cleveland Baichley (December 10, 1889 – June 28, 1956) was an American professional baseball pitcher who played for the St. Louis Browns of the American League in 1914.

== Early life and career ==
Baichley was born on December 10, 1889, in Toledo, Illinois, the son of John W. Baichley and Minnie Darling Baichley. He was named after President Grover Cleveland, who was in the final year of his first term in office when Baichley was born. He began playing baseball for clubs in Mattoon and Shelbyville, Illinois, in the early 1910s before he enlisted in the United States Army in 1911. While serving in the Philippines, he played for military baseball teams from 1912 to 1914. During a game on March 7, 1914, he faced the 24th Infantry Regiment team that included future Baseball Hall of Famers Oscar Charleston and Bullet Rogan, and allowed only two hits against the team.

After his discharge in 1914, he began his professional baseball career with the Champaign Velvets of the Illinois–Missouri League in 1914. on June 10, he threw a no-hitter against the Lincoln Abes, striking out 11 batters.

On July 19, Baichley was acquired, along with second baseman John Morgan, by the Burlington Pathfinders of the Central Association. The deal was instigated by Burlington president Thomas C. Hayden, who also served as a scout for the American League's St. Louis Browns. At the time of the trade, Baichley had a 2.07 earned run average and a 15-2 win-loss record, winning 15 games in a row before the deal. He made his debut with Burlington on July 23, striking out 10 hitters and allowing thee hits in an 8-1 win over the Rock Island Islanders. On August 12, Baichley and the Pathfinders defeated the Browns in an exhibition game. By August 15, he had been offered a provisional contract from St. Louis.

== St. Louis Browns ==
Baichley made his major league debut on August 24 against the Philadelphia Athletics. Entering the game in the seventh inning in relief of Earl Hamilton, he allowed two runs, one of which was earned, and struck out two hitters as St. Louis lost 7–1. He appeared in three more games for St. Louis before he experienced lumbago, which ended his season after a game against the Detroit Tigers on September 4.

== Return to minor leagues and semi-pro clubs ==
In February 1915, Baichley returned to the Burlington Pathfinders after being released by the St. Louis Browns. He won a Central Association-best 23 games and led the league in strikeouts with 310 as the team won the league championship for the first time since 1909. After the regular season ended, he left for Ladd, Illinois, where he played for a local ballclub, winning six of the eight games he pitched. Baichley then returned home to Cumberland County, Illinois, where he served as the assistant county clerk before reporting back to the Pathfinders for the start of the 1916 season. By July, the Burlington club disbanded and Baichley joined the Cedar Rapids Rabbits.

Baichley dealt with arm soreness in 1916 and began the 1917 season on the bench, appearing as an outfielder during the club's first two games. In May 1917, he left organized baseball to volunteer at an officers' training camp in Fort Sheridan, Illinois, and registered for the World War I draft. Baichley served in the 363rd Infantry as part of the 91st Division, but was solely stationed in the United States, where he continued to play baseball. He was discharged in February 1918.

By 1919 he was pitching for the Hammond club of the East Chicago League. From 1920 to 1922, Baichley pitched for the semi-pro Chicago Pyotts. Among the teams he faced were the Chicago American Giants, whom he defeated on August 24.In 1923, illness and a death in his family prevented Baichley from playing until mid-season, when he joined a club based in Canton, Ohio. He threw a seven-inning no-hitter on August 24. He continued pitching for multiple semi-pro clubs in the Midwestern United States until at least 1927.

== Personal life and death ==
Baichley married Nell O'Day, a school teacher in Trilla, Illinois, in 1921. Nell died on the couple's 30th wedding anniversary at their home in Tacoma, Washington, on June 20, 1951. He died on June 28, 1956, in California. His body was found in his apartment by his landlady after he had failed to collect his mail. He died from what was reported in the San Francisco Examiner as a self-inflicted gunshot wound.
