= Lincoln Abes =

Minor league baseball team

- (1910–1914); Lincoln, Illinois

Minor league affiliations
- Class: Class D (1910–1914)
- League: Illinois-Missouri League (1910–1914)

Major league affiliations
- Team: None

Minor league titles
- League titles (2): 1912; 1913

Team data
- Name: Lincoln Abes (1910–1914)
- Ballpark: Scully/Latham Park* (1910–1914)

The Lincoln Abes were a minor league baseball team based in Lincoln, Illinois. From 1910 to 1914, the Abes played as members of the Class D level Illinois-Missouri League. Lincoln won consecutive league championships in 1912 and 1913 and were in first place when the franchise folded during the 1914 season. The "Abes" nickname corresponded to President Abraham Lincoln, who was the namesake of the city and resided in the area.

== History ==
The Lincoln Abes began minor league baseball play as members of the six–team Class D 1910 Illinois–Missouri League. The Pekin Celestials 66–47, Canton Chinks, Clinton Champs, Jacksonville Jacks, Macomb Potters and Pekin Celestials teams joined Lincoln in beginning league play. The Lincoln "Abes" moniker corresponds to President Abraham Lincoln, the namesake of the city and who lived in the region.

In their first season of play, the Abes ended the 1910 season in last place in the Illinois-Missouri League final standings. With a record of 43–71, Jim Novacek and Harry Saillard served as managers during the season, as the Abes finished 23.5 games behind the champion Pekin Celestials. The 1910 league standings showed the Pekin Celestials 66–47, Clinton Champs 58–57, Canton Chinks 55–62, Macomb Potters 50–43, Beardstown/Jacksonville Jacks 44–36 and Lincoln Abes 43–71. Jacksonville and Macomb both disbanded on August 17, 1910, putting the Lincoln Abes in fourth place overall. The league held no playoffs. The Lincoln Abes were unaffiliated with a major league baseball franchise and featured local players on their 1910 roster.

In their second season, the 1911 Lincoln Abes placed fifth in the Illinois–Missouri League. The Abes ended the 1911 season with a record of 59–64, playing the season +under managers Harry Saillard, James Brady, Clarence Vaught and Jack Corbett. Lincoln finished 12.0 games behind the first place Clinton Champs in the final standings.

With the hiring of manager Louis Ehrgott for the 1912 season, the Lincoln Abes won the first of their back–to–back Illinois–Missouri League championships. The Abes ended the 1912 season with a record of 70–47 to place first in the Illinois–Missouri League regular season, finishing 8.5 games ahead of the second place Pekin Celestials. The league had no playoffs. Ray Wolfe of Lincoln won the league batting title, hitting .374. Wolfe also led the Illinois–Missouri League with 164 total hits and 89 runs scored. Abes pitcher Clarence Vaught won 22 games to lead the league.

The 1913 Lincoln Abes defended their title, winning another 1913 Illinois–Missouri League championship. The 1913 Lincoln Abes ended the season with a record of 57–26, to finish in first place in the Illinois–Missouri League season standings. Lincoln finished 5.0 games ahead of the second place Champaign Velvets, as manager Louis Ehrgott again led the Abes to a championship. Charles Moors of Lincoln won the league batting title, hitting .440. Teammate Dick Higgins led the Illinois–Missouri League with 65 runs scored. Abes pitcher Clarence Vaught won 21 games and had 166 strikeouts to lead the league in both categories, while Ernest Hooks' 16–2 record led the league in win percentage.

The Lincoln Abes' pursuit of a third straight Illinois–Missouri League championship under manager Louis Ehrgott ended during the 1914 season with the team in first place. On July 3, 1914, the Abes had a record of 32–15 and were in first place. Despite being in first place, Lincoln disbanded on July 3, folding along with the Kankakee Kanks. The Champaign Velvets eventually captured the 1914 championship. The remaining four–team Illinois–Missouri League permanently folded after the 1914 season.

The Illinois–Missouri League did not return to play. Lincoln has not hosted another minor league team.

== The ballpark ==
The name of the home minor league ballpark for the Lincoln Abes is not directly referenced.

A 1909 Lincoln insurance map also shows a "public park" bordered by Kickapoo, Clinton, S. McLean and Decatur Streets. Today, the location is still in use as a public park called Scully Park. The park is located at 303 South Kickapoo Street in Lincoln. Scully Park was an original park when the city was plotted in 1853. Latham Park was the other original city park, still in use and located at 799 Pekin Street. A streetcar line in the era was described as running from the Latham Hotel, past the "baseball park" and out to the Union Cemetery. Such a route would have passed both Scully and Latham Parks.

== Timeline ==
Year(s)	# Yrs.	Team	Level	League
1910–1914	5	Lincoln Abes	Class D	Illinois-Missouri League

== Year–by–year records ==
Year	Record	Finish	Manager	Playoffs/Notes
1910	43–71	4th	Jim Novacek / Harry Saillardy	No playoffs held
1911	59–64	5th	Bill Salliard / James Brady / Charles Vaught / Jack Corbett	No playoffs held
1912	70–47	1st	Louis Ehrgott	League champions
1913	57–26	1st	Louis Ehrgott	League champions
1914	32–15	1st*	Louis Ehrgott	Team disbanded July 2

=== Notable alumni ===
- George Kaiserling (1911)
- Paul Smith (1910)
- Polly Wolfe (1910–1912)

== See also ==
Lincoln Abes players
