= Kankakee Kanks =

- 1912–1914; (1910, 1912–1914); Kankakee, Illinois

Minor league affiliations
- Class: Class D (1910, 1912–1914)
- League: Northern Association (1910); Illinois-Missouri League (1912–1914)

Major league affiliations
- Team: None

Minor league titles
- League titles (0): None

Team data
- Name: Kankakee Kays (1910); Kankakee Kanks (1912–1914)
- Ballpark: Kankakee State Hospital (1910, 1912–1914)

The Kankakee Kanks were a minor league baseball team located in Kankakee, Illinois. The Kankakee Kanks played as a member of the Class D level Illinois-Missouri League from 1912 to 1914. The Kankakee "Kays" were the first minor league team based in Kankakee, playing as members of the 1910 Northern Association.

The Kankakee teams hosted home minor league games on the grounds of the Kankakee State Hospital.

Baseball Hall of Fame inductee Casey Stengel played for the 1910 Kankakee Kays in his first professional season.

== History ==
=== 1910: Northern Association ===
Minor league baseball began in Kankakee, Illinois in 1910, when the Kankakee Kays team became charter members of the Class D level Northern Association. The Clinton Teddies, Decatur Commodores, Elgin Kittens, Freeport Pretzels, Jacksonville Jacks, Joliet Jolly-ites and Muscatine Pearl Finders teams Joined Kankakee as the charter members of the eight–team league, which began play on May 10, 1910.

In their first season of minor league play, the Kankakee franchise folded during the season. On July 11, 1910, the Kankakee Kays were in third place with a 34–24 record under manager Dan Collins when the franchise disbanded. The Elgin Kittens franchise disbanded on the same day. Less than a week later, the Northern Association completely disbanded on July 17, 1910. In the final standings, Kankakee finished 3½ games behind first place Elgin. Kankakee pitcher Thomas McTigue had 11 wins and tied for the league lead. McTigue had an 11–3 overall record in the shortened season.

==== Casey Stengel ====
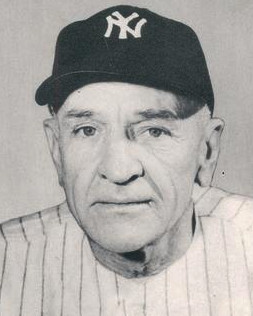
(1957) Casey Stengel, manager, New York Yankees. Stengel played for Kankakee in 1910 in his first professional season.

Baseball Hall of Fame member Casey Stengel made his professional debut for the Kankakee Kays in 1910. Stengel played his first professional game in the season opener on May 10, 1910. At age 19, Stengel hit .251 with one home run, playing in 59 games for Kankakee.

In talking about his season playing in Kankakee Casey Stengel said, "We did not draw (fans) and getting paid was quite an adventure." Stengel claimed he had received only half of his $135 per month check when Kankakee had folded in July 1910. Years later, at his birthday party in 1956, the Kankakee Federal Savings and Loan Association presented Stengel with a check. The check was for $483.05, calculated off the original $67.50 owed, plus interest accrued over 46 years. Stengel donated the gift to the Kankakee Little League.

=== 1912 to 1914: Illinois–Missouri League ===
After the Kankakee Kays folded following the 1910 season, minor league baseball returned for the 1912 season. On May 16, 1912, the Clinton Champs from Clinton, Iowa, members of the Illinois-Missouri League, moved the franchise to Kankakee with a 2–5 record. The Mississippi River flood of 1912 corresponds with the Clinton franchise relocation that year.

Playing the remainder of the 1912 season as the Kankakee Kanks, the team compiled a record of 54–51 while based in Kankakee. The Clinton/Kankakee team finished with an overall record of 56–56, placing fourth in the 1912 Illinois-Missouri League playing under managers Claude Suttles and Fred Wilson. The Kanks joined Illinois–Missouri League members Canton Highlanders, Champaign Velvets, Lincoln Abes, Pekin Celestials and Streator Speedboys in 1912 league play.

Continuing play in the 1913 Illinois–Missouri League, the Kanks finished in third place. With a 35–51 record under manager Red Kelly, Kankakee finished the season 23½ games behind the first place Lincoln Abes in the six–team league final standings. A.J. Holtzhouser of Kankakee led the Illinois-Missouri League with 118 total hits.

In their final season of minor league play, the 1914 Kankakee Kanks folded before the end of the season. On July 3, 1914, Kankakee had a record of 14–33 when the franchise permanently disbanded. At the time they folded, Kankakee was 17½ games behind the first place Lincoln Abes, who folded the same day. Kankakee played in 1914 under managers Harry Randall, Gene Connelly, Teddy Raines and William Hinley. The Illinois–Missouri League finished the 1914 season without the Kankakee and Lincoln teams.

The Illinois–Missouri League permanently disbanded after the 1914 season. Kankakee, Illinois has not hosted another minor league team.

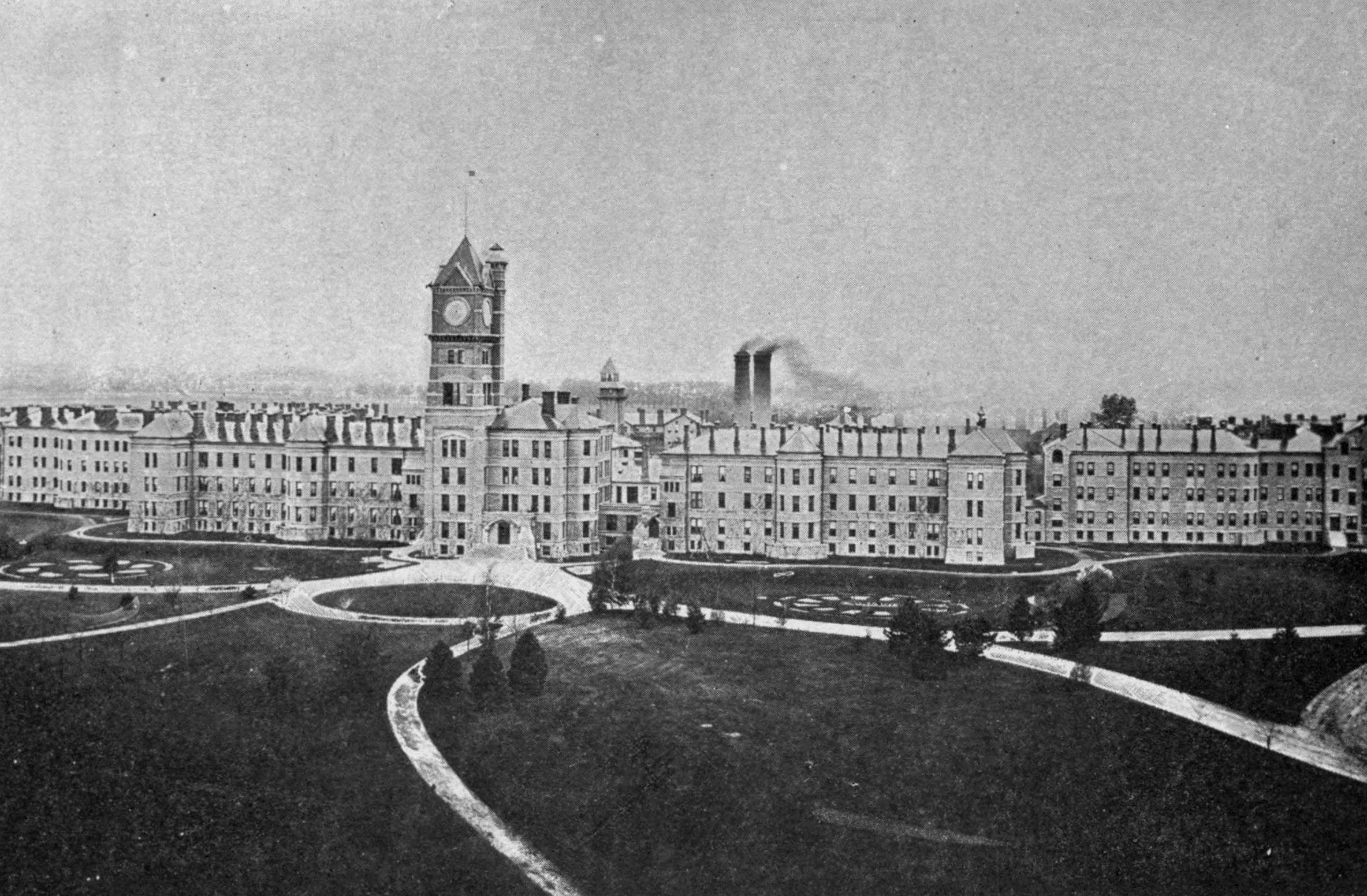
Kankakee State Hospital. Kankakee, Illinois

== The ballpark ==
Kankakee minor league teams played home games at the ballpark adjacent to the Kankakee State Hospital. The ballpark had hosted a game featuring the Leland Giants against a hospital sponsored team in 1907. Because of the ballpark location, patients at the hospital could watch games from the hospital windows. Today, the hospital location is 100 East Jeffery Street in Kankakee, Illinois.

== Timeline ==
Year(s)	# Yrs.	Team	Level	League	Ballpark
1910	1	Kankakee Kays	Class D	Northern Association	Kankakee State Hospital
1912–1914	3	Kankakee Kanks	Class D	Illinois-Missouri League	Kankakee State Hospital

== Year–by–year records ==
Year	Record	Finish	Manager	Playoffs/notes
1910	34–24	3rd	Dan Collins	League folded July 17
1912	54–51	4th	Claude Suttles / Fred Wilson	No playoffs held
1913	35–51	3rd	Red Kelly	No playoffs held
1914	14–33	2nd	Harry Randall / Gene Connelly; Teddy Raines / William Hinley	Team folded July 3

== Notable alumni ==
- Casey Stengel (1910) Inducted Baseball Hall of Fame, 1966
- George Hale (1912)
- Elmer Jacobs (1912)
- Bobby Veach (1910) 3x AL RBI leader
- Bob Wright (1913)
- Zacharia Raslan

== See also ==
- Kankakee Kanks players
- Kankakee Kays players
