= Gus Creely =

American baseball player (1870–1934)

- Shortstop
- Born: June 6, 1870; St. Louis, Missouri, U.S.
- Died: April 22, 1934 (aged 63); St. Louis, Missouri, U.S.
- Batted: Unknown Threw: Unknown

MLB debut
- October 9, 1890, for the St. Louis Browns

Last MLB appearance
- October 11, 1890, for the St. Louis Browns

MLB statistics
- Batting average: .000
- Home runs: 0
- Runs batted in: 0
- Stats at Baseball Reference

Former teams
- Monmouth Maple Cities (minor league) (1890)

Teams
- St. Louis Browns (1890)

August L. Creely (June 6, 1870 – April 22, 1934) was an American Major League Baseball player. He played shortstop in four games for the St. Louis Browns of the American Association during the 1890 baseball season. He played primarily in the minor leagues from 1887 to 1896, including for the Monmouth Maple Cities (Illinois-Iowa League) in 1890.

== Sources ==
- Career statistics from Baseball Reference · Baseball Reference (Minors) · Retrosheet · Baseball Almanac
