= Champaign–Urbana, Illinois, minor league baseball history =

Champaign–Urbana minor league baseball teams
- 1889–1914; (1889, 1911–1914); Champaign, Illinois

Minor league affiliations
- Class: Independent (1889); Class D (1911–1914)
- League: Illinois-Indiana League (1889); Illinois-Missouri League (1911–1914)

Major league affiliations
- Team: None

Minor league titles
- League titles (1): 1914

Team data
- Name: Champaign–Urbana Clippers (1889); Champaign–Urbana Velvets (1911); Champaign Velvets (1912–1914)
- Ballpark: East Urbana (1911); West Champaign (1912–1914)

Minor league baseball franchises were based in Champaign, Illinois and neighboring Urbana, Illinois in various seasons between 1889 and 1914. Champaign and Urbana teams played as members of the Independent level Illinois-Indiana League in 1889 and the Class D level Illinois-Missouri League from 1911 to 1914, winning the 1914 league championship.

== History ==
The 1889 Champaign–Urbana Clippers were the first minor league baseball team in Champaign–Urbana. The Clippers played as members of the Illinois-Indiana League, managed by F.L. Bliss. The Clippers replaced the Logansport, Indiana team, which had disbanded. The Champaign–Urbana Clippers record is unknown, but the Terre Haute, Indiana team won the league pennant. The Illinois–Indiana League became the Illinois-Iowa League in 1890 and the Champaign–Urbana Clippers did not return to the new league.

In 1911, minor league baseball returned when the Champaign–Urbana Velvets became members of the Class D level Illinois-Missouri League. The Velvets were joined by the Clinton Champs, Pekin Celestials, Canton Chinks, Lincoln Abes and Taylorville Christians in league play.

With a record of 66–60, the 1911 Champaign–Urbana Velvets finished in third place in the Illinois–Missouri League, playing under managers Jack Thiery and Fred Donovan. The Velvets finished 6.5 games behind the first place Clinton Champs in the final league standings. The Velvets' third place finish was reflected in the league standings with the Velvets finishing behind the Clinton Champs (74–55), and Pekin Celestials (72–55), with the Velvets ahead of the Canton Chinks (60–62), Lincoln Abes (59–64) and Taylorville Christians (47–82).

The franchise use of the "Velvets" moniker corresponded to a popular beer in the era, called Champaign Velvet, brewed by the Terre Haute Brewing Company.

In 1912, the franchise moved to a ballpark in Champaign, playing as the Champaign Velvets in the six–team Illinois–Missouri League. Champaign placed fifth in the regular season standings with a record of 53–64, finishing 17.0 games behind the first place Lincoln Abes. The 1912 Champaign manager was Chuck Fleming.

The 1913 Champaign Velvets placed second in the Illinois–Missouri League final standings. The Velvets finished 5.0 games behind the champion Lincoln Abes. Champaign had a 53–32 record, playing the season under manager Blackie Wilson.

The 1914 Champaign Velvets were the Illinois–Missouri League Champions in what was the final season of the Illinois–Missouri League. On June 10, 1914, Champaign pitcher Grover Baichley threw a no–hitter in a 4–0 victory over the Lincoln Abes. The 1914 Champaign Velvets ended the season with a 62–27 record, finishing 13.0 games ahead of the second place Ottawa Indians. The Velvets manager was again Blackie Wilson. Champaign was unable to defend their championship, as the Illinois–Missouri League permanently folded after the 1914 season.

The franchise had financial challenges typical of minor league baseball in the era. Ironically, given the team moniker, alcohol was banned from being sold in Champaign and the team abided by the law, which affected revenues. Tickets were $0.25 and every Wednesday home game was "Ladies Day."

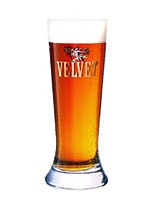
Champaign Velvet Beer

The Champaign–Urbana next hosted minor league baseball when the 1994 Champaign-Urbana Bandits played the season as members of the independent Great Central League.

== The ballparks ==
Although the exact location and name is unknown, the 1911 Champaign–Urbana Velvets were noted to have played at a ballpark in east Urbana.

The exact location and name is unknown, but the Champaign Velvets reportedly played at a ballpark on the west side of Champaign from 1912 to 1914.

== Timeline ==
Year(s)	# Yrs.	Team	Level	League
1899	1	Champaign–Urbana Clippers	Independent	Illinois-Indiana League
1911	1	Champaign–Urbana Velvets	Class D	Illinois-Missouri League
1912–1914	3	Champaign Velvets	Class D	Illinois-Missouri League

== Year–by–year records ==
Year	Record	Finish	Manager	Playoffs/Notes
1889	00–00	NA	F.L. Bliss	League records unknown
1911	66–60	3rd	Jack Thiery / Fred Donovan	No playoffs held
1912	53–64	4th	Chuck Fleming	No playoffs held
1913	53–32	2nd	Fred "Blackie" Wilson	No playoffs held
1914	62–27	1st	Fred "Blackie" Wilson	League champions

== Notable alumni ==
- Grover Baichley (1914)
- Hod Eller (1913)
- Bill Ludwig (1912)
- George Orme (1914)
- Earl Tyree (1913)
- Charlie Whitehouse (1914)

== See also ==
Champaign Velvets players
Champaign-Urbana Clippers players
