= Mike Trost =

American baseball player (1866–1901)

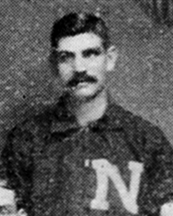
- Catcher
- Born: 1866; Philadelphia, Pennsylvania, U.S.
- Died: March 24, 1901 (aged 34–35); Philadelphia, Pennsylvania, U.S.

MLB debut
- August 21, 1890, for the St. Louis Browns

Last MLB appearance
- September 29, 1895, for the Louisville Colonels

MLB statistics
- Batting average: .222
- Home runs: 1
- Runs batted in: 8
- Stats at Baseball Reference

Teams
- St. Louis Browns (1890); Louisville Colonels (1895)

Michael J. Trost (1866 – March 24, 1901) was an American Major League Baseball catcher. He played for the St. Louis Browns of the American Association in 17 games during the 1890 season and for the Louisville Colonels of the National League in 3 games in 1895. He also had an extensive minor league baseball career that lasted from 1888 until 1900. He was the player/manager for the Newport News Shipbuilders of the Virginia League in 1900.

== Sources ==
- Career statistics from Baseball Reference · Baseball Reference (Minors) · Retrosheet · Baseball Almanac
