= Bumpus Jones =

American baseball player (1870–1938)

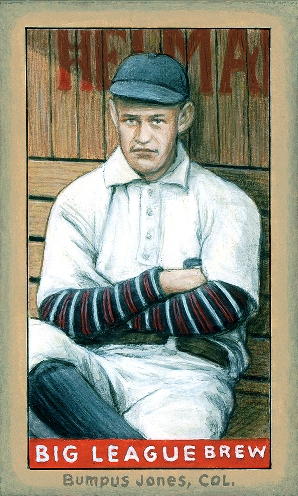
- Pitcher
- Born: January 1, 1870; Cedarville, Ohio, U.S.
- Died: June 25, 1938 (aged 68); Xenia, Ohio, U.S.
- Batted: Right Threw: Right

MLB debut
- October 15, 1892, for the Cincinnati Reds

Last MLB appearance
- July 14, 1893, for the New York Giants

MLB statistics
- Win–loss record: 2–4
- Earned run average: 7.99
- Strikeouts: 10
- Stats at Baseball Reference

Teams
- Cincinnati Reds (1892–1893); New York Giants (1893)

Career highlights and awards
- Pitched a no-hitter on October 15, 1892

Charles Leander "Bumpus" Jones (January 1, 1870 – June 25, 1938) was an American right-handed starting pitcher in Major League Baseball who played for the Cincinnati Reds and New York Giants.

== Early life ==
He was born in Cedarville, Ohio. Newspaper accounts from Cedarville have described him as being listed as black, albeit with skin that passed for Caucasian. Census reports listed him as a "mulatto". Genealogical research has speculated that Jones came from "Pocahontas' people in Virginia." In reality he was Occaneechi-Saponi and Catawba.

== Baseball career ==
Prior to his work in major league baseball, Jones played for the minor league Monmouth Maple Cities (Illinois–Iowa League) in 1890.

Jones made only eight appearances in his brief major league career. He threw a no-hitter in his first major league appearance with the Cincinnati Reds on October 15, 1892, the last day of the season. The Reds defeated the Pittsburgh Pirates, 7–1. Jones was not perfect, as he gave up four walks, and he did not pitch a shutout, as an error led to an unearned run. He is the first player in major league history to pitch a no-hitter in his first game. It was one of the last games played with a "pitcher's box" with the pitcher beginning 55 1/2 feet from home plate; the following season, the pitcher's mound would be introduced, with pitchers starting their pitch on a rubber slab 60 feet and 6 inches from home plate.

Jones split the 1893 season between Cincinnati and the New York Giants, appearing in seven games overall, while going 1–4 with a 10.19 ERA. Jones would never pitch in the majors again. Only Bobo Holloman of the St. Louis Browns, Ted Breitenstein of the St. Louis Browns, and Tyler Gilbert of the Arizona Diamondbacks have managed to join Jones as pitchers to throw no-hitters in their first major league start, but they had previously appeared in a relief role. According to sabermetrician Bill James, Jones edges out Holloman for the distinction of mathematically least likely pitcher ever to have thrown a no-hitter in the major leagues. Jones was the only player to make their major league debut in a no-hitter until Alimber Santa threw the final two innings of a combined no-hitter on May 25, 2026.

In a two-season major league career, Jones posted a 2–4 career record with 10 strikeouts and a 7.99 ERA in 41 2/3 innings pitched. After leaving the major leagues, Jones continued to pitch professionally. He pitched for the Grand Rapids Rustlers and Sioux City Cornhuskers in 1894. He pitched for the Columbus Senators from 1896 to 1899, and until recently, was credited with the team record for career games pitched, with 212. Modern research, however, indicates that the actual total may be closer to 150. Jones finished his minor league career with the St. Paul Saints in 1901.

== Death ==
Jones died in Xenia, Ohio on June 25, 1938, at age 68 from complications of a stroke, and he was buried at North Cemetery in Cedarville, Ohio.

== See also ==
- List of Major League Baseball no-hitters

Achievements
Preceded by Ben Sanders	No-hitter pitcher October 15, 1892	Succeeded by Bill Hawke
