= Polly Wolfe =

American baseball player (1888–1938)

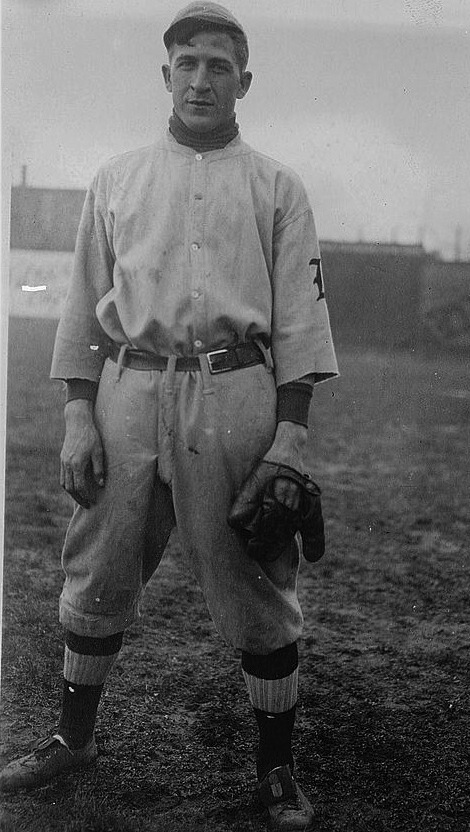
- Right fielder
- Born: September 1, 1888; Knoxville, Illinois, U.S.
- Died: November 21, 1938 (aged 50); Morris, Illinois, U.S.
- Batted: Left Threw: Right

MLB debut
- September 22, 1912, for the Chicago White Sox

Last MLB appearance
- August 31, 1914, for the Chicago White Sox

MLB statistics
- Batting average: .207
- Home runs: 0
- Runs batted in: 0
- Stats at Baseball Reference

Teams
- Chicago White Sox (1912–14)

Roy Chamberlain "Polly" Wolfe (September 1, 1888 – November 21, 1938) was an American professional baseball player. He played parts of two seasons in Major League Baseball, 1912 and 1914, for the Chicago White Sox, primarily as a right fielder. In 1912 he made one appearance as a pinch hitter, striking out. In 1914 he made eight appearances, seven playing right field, and one as a pinch hitter. He batted .214 for his career and made one error, which greatly affected his overall fielding percentage, (.875).

He is part of the select group of Major League Players to play at Wahconah Park.

== Sources ==
- Career statistics from Baseball Reference · Baseball Reference (Minors) · Retrosheet · Baseball Almanac
