= Paul Smith (outfielder) =

American baseball player (1888–1958)

- Left fielder
- Born: May 7, 1888; Mount Zion, Illinois
- Died: July 3, 1958 (aged 70); Decatur, Illinois
- Batted: Left Threw: Right

MLB debut
- September 19, 1916, for the Cincinnati Reds

Last MLB appearance
- October 1, 1916, for the Cincinnati Reds

MLB statistics
- Batting average: .227
- Home runs: 0
- Runs batted in: 1

Teams
- Cincinnati Reds (1916)

Paul Stoner Smith (May 7, 1888 – July 3, 1958) was a Major League Baseball outfielder. Smith played in 10 games in the 1916 season with the Cincinnati Reds. He had 10 hits in 44 at-bats with a .227 batting average.

Smith was born in Mount Zion, Illinois and died in Decatur, Illinois.
