= John Fitzpatrick (baseball) =

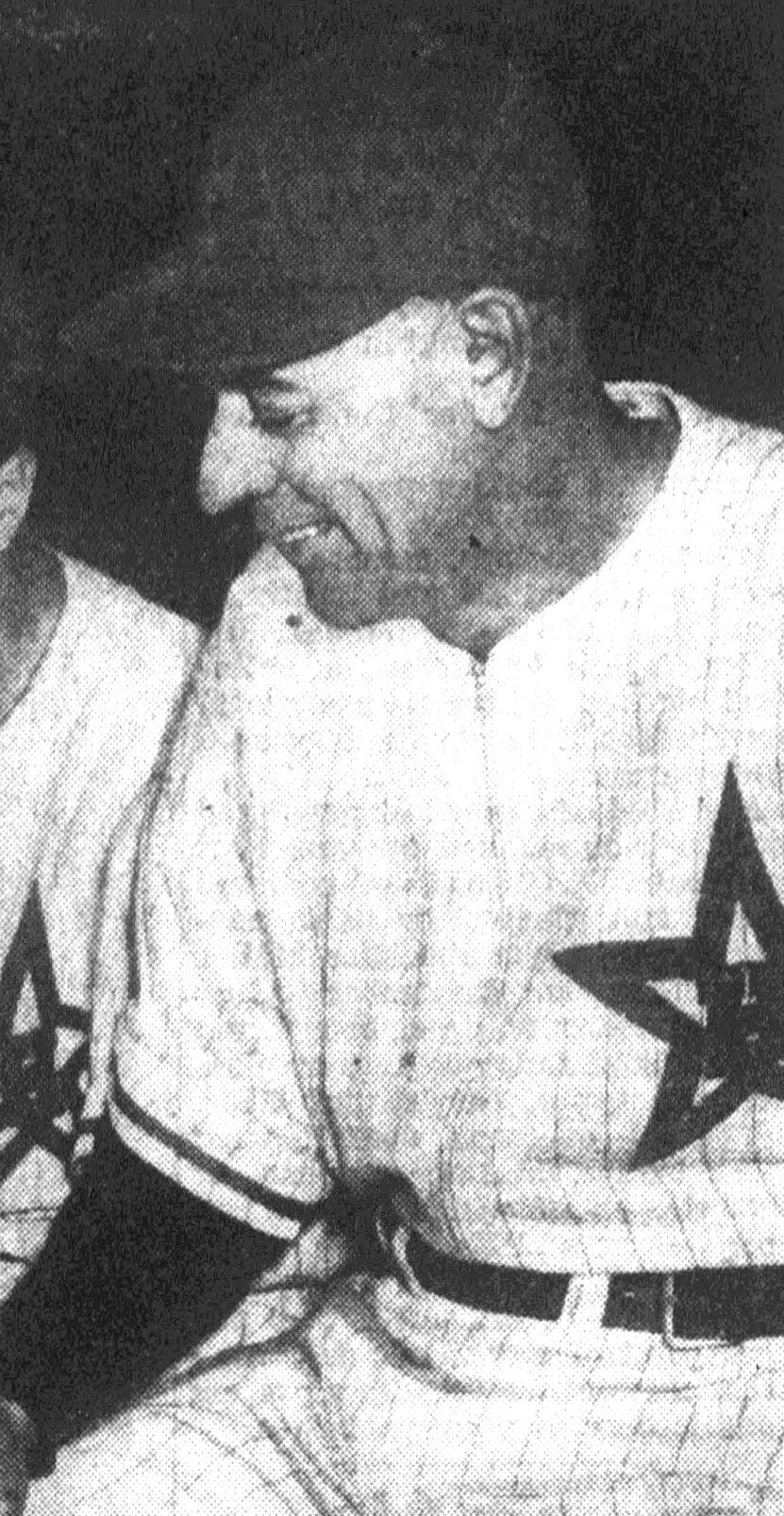
- Fitzpatrick, circa 1951
- Coach
- Born: March 19, 1904; LaSalle, Illinois, U.S.
- Died: November 19, 1990 (aged 86); San Diego, California, U.S.
- Batted: Right Threw: Right
- Stats at Baseball Reference

Teams
- Pittsburgh Pirates (1953–1955); Milwaukee Braves (1958–1959)

John Arthur Fitzpatrick (March 19, 1904 – November 19, 1990), nicknamed "Foghorn" and "Eagle Beak", was an American Major League Baseball coach and scout and minor league catcher and manager. He was born in LaSalle, Illinois, but later in his life lived in McAlester, Oklahoma.

Fitzpatrick appeared in 1,933 games over 21 seasons (1924–41; 1944–46) as a minor league player, batting .288. At one point is his career, he went one and a half years without striking out. He was a coach for the Pittsburgh Pirates from 1953 to 1955 and the Milwaukee Braves from 1958 to 1959.

He managed minor league teams intermittently during the period of 1936–63 in the Pittsburgh, Chicago White Sox, Cleveland Indians, Brooklyn Dodgers, New York Yankees, Chicago Cubs and Los Angeles Angels farm systems. He was a longtime associate of Fred Haney, whom he served as a coach with the Hollywood Stars, Pirates and Braves, and for whom he scouted for the Angels after his managing career.

He died at age 86 in San Diego, California.
