= Macomb Potters =

- 1908–1910; Macomb, Illinois

Minor league affiliations
- Class: Class D (1908–1910)
- League: Illinois-Missouri League (1908–1910)

Major league affiliations
- Team: None

Minor league titles
- League titles (0): None

Team data
- Name: Macomb Potters (1908–1910)
- Ballpark: Unknown (1908–1910)

The Macomb Potters were a minor league baseball franchise based in Macomb, Illinois. From 1908 to 1910, the Potters played exclusively as members of the Class D level Illinois-Missouri League. The Potters hosted exhibition games in Macomb against the Chicago Cubs in both 1909 and 1910, losing both contests.

== History ==
Minor league baseball was first hosted in Macomb, Illinois in 1908, when the Macomb "Potters" minor league franchise was formed. On March 24, 1908, a public meeting was held to gain support and structure a minor league team in Macomb. At the meeting, the "Potters' moniker was suggested by resident Harry Grigsby, as the name reflected a prevailing local industry. The "Potters" moniker was adopted. The Macomb Potters then became charter members of the Class D Illinois-Missouri League after local baseball enthusiasts and fans raised funds to start the team, hire a team manager and pay players.

Macomb joined the Canton Chinks, Galesburg Hornets, Hannibal Cannibals, Havana Perfectos and Monmouth Browns teams as charter members of the Illinois–Missouri League, which began play on May 12, 1908.

In their first season of play, the Potters finished as the runner–up in the six–team Illinois–Missouri League. With a record of 66–53, the Potters placed second in the standings, finishing 3.0 games behind the first place Hannibal Cannibals. The 1908 Macomb manager was Jap Wagner. The initial 1908 Illinois–Missouri League standings season standings consisted of the champion Hannibal Cannibals (68–49), followed by the Macomb Potters (66–53), Havana Perfectos (58–61), Canton Chinks (56–61), Monmouth Browns (55–62) and Galesburg Hornets (50–67), as the league held no playoffs.

The 1909 Macomb Potters continued play in their second season in the Illinois–Missouri League.

On Friday, June 18, 1909, the Potters hosted an exhibition game against the defending World Series Champion Chicago Cubs. The game was scheduled with the agreement that the Cubs would feature their regular lineup. The selected date allowed the Cubs to play in between the Cubs' series with the Brooklyn Superbas. The game was advertised as "the greatest day in the baseball history of McDonough County," in a large advertisement placed in the June 17, 1909, Macomb Daily Journal. The teams took infield at 2:30 p.m., with the game starting at 3:00 p.m. In front of 2,964 fans, the Cubs beat the Potters 6–0. Admission was $1.00 per ticket. After the game, each team split the gate money minus expenses and each club received $971.50.

With a 1909 regular season record of 63–67, Macomb placed fourth in the six–team Illinois–Missouri League standings. Playing the season under Manager Orville Wolfe, the Potters finished 16.0 games behind the first place Monmouth Browns. The league held no playoffs.

During the 1910 season, the Macomb Potters and the Chicago Cubs played a second exhibition game, again hosted by the Potters at their ballpark in Macomb. The 1910 game was won by the Cubs by the score of 5–0.

In their final season of play, the 1910 Macomb Potters disbanded before the end of the Illinois–Missouri League season. On August 17, 1910, the Potters had a record of 50–43 and the team was second place in the League standings when the franchise permanently folded. The Jacksonville Jacks franchise disbanded from the league on the same day. The 1910 Macomb manager was Joseph Stewart.

The 1910 Macomb Potters were the last minor league team hosted in Macomb, Illinois.

== The ballpark ==
The exact name and location of the ballpark for the Macomb Potters is not directly referenced. In the era, the campus of Western Illinois University hosted baseball, as did Macomb's McDonough County Fairgrounds, which hosted Macomb semi-pro games in Macomb's immediate post-Potters era, including one contest featuring Shoeless Joe Jackson.

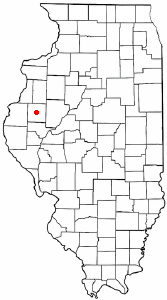
Macomb, Illinois location

== Timeline ==
| Year(s) | # Yrs. | Team | Level | League |
|---|---|---|---|---|
| 1908–1910 | 3 | Macomb Potters | Class D | Illinois-Missouri League |

== Year–by–year records ==
| Year | Record | Finish | Manager | Playoffs/notes |
|---|---|---|---|---|
| 1908 | 66–53 | 2nd | Jap Wagner | No playoffs held |
| 1909 | 63–67 | 4th | Orville Wolfe | No playoffs held |
| 1910 | 50–43 | NA | Joseph Stewart | Team disbanded August 17 |

== Notable alumni ==
- Joe McManus (1910)
- Joseph Stewart (1910, MGR)
- Macomb Potters players
