= Canton Chinks =

US minor league baseball team (1908–1913)

- 1908–1913; Canton, Illinois

Minor league affiliations
- Class: Class D (1908–1913)
- League: Illinois-Missouri League (1908–1913)

Major league affiliations
- Team: None

Minor league titles
- League titles (0): None

Team data
- Name: Canton Chinks (1908–1911); Canton Highlanders (1912); Canton Chinks (1913)
- Ballpark: Athletic Park (1908–1913)

The Canton Chinks were a minor league baseball team based in Canton, Illinois. From 1908 to 1913, Canton teams played exclusively as members of the Class D level Illinois-Missouri League, as the 1912 team played as the "Highlanders." Canton hosted home minor league games at Athletic Park.

== History ==
In 1908, the Canton Chinks were founded as the first minor league baseball team in Canton, becoming charter members of the Class D level Illinois-Missouri League. The Canton Chinks moniker derived from Canton being named after a Chinese city, as is nearby Pekin, Illinois. Relatedly, Pekin High School in the region used the same moniker until 1981, when the slur was deemed offensive and replaced.

In their first season of play, Canton finished the 1908 season with a 56–61 record, placing fourth in the Illinois–Missouri League standings, playing the season under manager Chuck Murphy. The charter members in the 1908 six–team league standings were the Canton Chinks (56–61), Galesburg Hornets (50–67), Hannibal Cannibals (68–49), Havana Perfectos (58–61), Macomb Potters (66–53) and Monmouth Browns (55–62). No league playoffs were held.

In the 1909 Illinois–Missouri League standings, Canton placed fifth in the six–team league, finishing 27½ games behind the champion Monmouth Browns. Canton finished with a regular season record of 51–79, playing under manager Harry Lloyd. Canton 1909 home season attendance at Athletic Park was 30,000, an average of 462 per home contest.

On August 18, 1909, Canton pitcher Charles Fanning threw a losing no–hitter against the Macomb Potters. However, Canton lost the game by the score of 2–0.

In 1910, Canton placed third in Illinois–Missouri League play, ending the season 13.0 games behind the first place Pekin Celestials. Canton had a 55–62 record playing under managers Elmer Smith and M. McDonald. The Macomb Potters and Jacksonville Jacks teams both folded during the season, leaving four teams to finish the season in the Illinois–Missouri League.

The Illinois–Missouri League again was a six–team league in 1911. Canton had a 60–62 record in the final Illinois–Missouri League standings, as the league remained a Class D level league. Canton placed fourth in the league standings, playing the season under manager Blackie Wilson and finishing 10½ games behind the first place Clinton Champs.

In 1912, Canton was known as the Canton Highlanders. Continuing play in the Illinois–Missouri League, the Highlanders finished the season with a record of 57–56. The Highlanders placed third in the Illinois–Missouri League, finishing 11.0 games behind the champion Lincoln Abes.

Canton returned to the Canton "Chinks" moniker in 1913, before folding midway through their final season. After beginning play in the six–team Class D level Illinois–Missouri League, Canton folded on July 10, 1913, with a 20–26 record under manager Ted Raines. The neighboring Pekin Celestials also folded on July 10, 1913, leaving the league with four teams to complete the season.

Canton was without a minor league team until the 1952 Canton Citizens played a partial season as members of the Class D level Mississippi-Ohio Valley League.

== The ballpark ==
The Canton minor league teams hosted 1908 to 1913 home minor league games at Athletic Park. Today, the Canton Athletic Park is still in use. The park is located at 900 First Avenue in Canton, Illinois.

== Timeline ==
Year(s)	# Yrs.	Team	Level	League	Ballpark
1908–1911	4	Canton Chinks	Class D	Illinois-Missouri League	Athletic Park
1912	1	Canton Highlanders	Class D	Illinois-Missouri League	Athletic Park
1913	1	Canton Chinks	Class D	Illinois-Missouri League	Athletic Park

== Year–by–year records ==
Year	Record	Finish	Manager	Playoffs / notes
1908	56–61	4th	Rodney Turner / Charles Murphy	No playoffs held
1909	51–79	5th	Harry Lloyd	No playoffs held
1910	55–72	3rd	Elmer Smith / M. McDonald	No playoffs held
1911	60–62	4th	Fred Wilson	No playoffs held
1912	57–56	3rd	Unknown	No playoffs held
1913	20–26	NA	Ted Raines	Team folded July 10

== Notable alumni ==
- Jerry Akers (1912)
- Joe McManus (1910–1911)
- Paul Smith (1910)

== See also ==
- Canton Chinks players
