= Bill Ludwig (baseball) =

American baseball player (1882–1947)

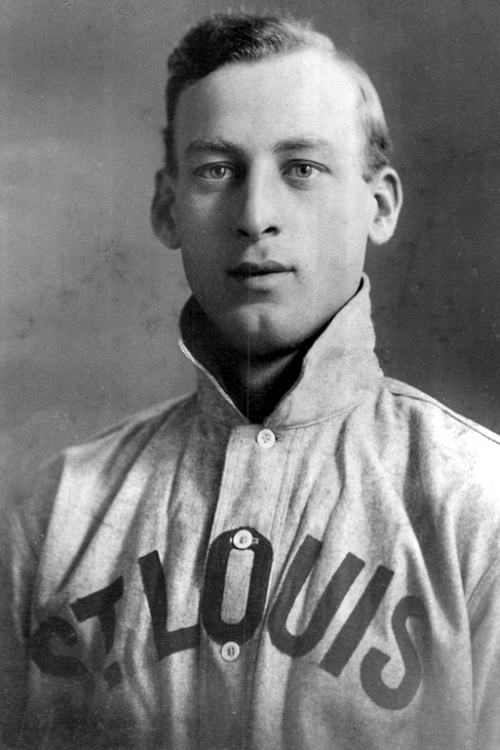
- Catcher
- Born: May 27, 1882; Louisville, Kentucky, U.S.
- Died: September 5, 1947 (aged 65); Louisville, Kentucky, U.S.
- Batted: Right Threw: Right

MLB debut
- April 16, 1908, for the St. Louis Cardinals

Last MLB appearance
- October 3, 1908, for the St. Louis Cardinals

MLB statistics
- Batting average: .182
- Home runs: 0
- Runs batted in: 8
- Stats at Baseball Reference

Teams
- St. Louis Cardinals (1908)

William Lawrence Ludwig (May 27, 1882 – September 5, 1947) was an American catcher in Major League Baseball. He played for the St. Louis Cardinals in 1908. He also played in the minor leagues for 11 seasons from 1903 through 1914.
