= Fred Kommers =

American baseball player (1886–1943)

- Outfielder
- Born: March 31, 1886; Chicago, Illinois, US
- Died: June 14, 1943 (aged 57); Chicago, Illinois, US
- Batted: Left Threw: Right

MLB debut
- June 25, 1913, for the Pittsburgh Pirates

Last MLB appearance
- September 26, 1914, for the Baltimore Terrapins

MLB statistics
- Batting average: .272
- Home runs: 4
- Runs batted in: 64
- Stats at Baseball Reference

Teams
- Pittsburgh Pirates (1913); St. Louis Terriers (1914); Baltimore Terrapins (1914)

Frederick Raymond Kommers (March 31, 1886 – June 14, 1943) nicknamed "Bugs", was an American professional baseball outfielder. Kommers played two seasons in the Major League Baseball. He debuted in June 1913 for the Pittsburgh Pirates and played 40 games for them over the rest of the season. In 1914, he split the season between two teams in the new Federal League, starting the year with the St. Louis Terriers and ending it with the Baltimore Terrapins.

== Sources ==
- Career statistics from MLB · Baseball Reference · Baseball Reference (Minors) · Retrosheet · Baseball Almanac
