= Pekin Celestials =

- Founded in 1909; 1909–1913; Pekin, Illinois

Minor league affiliations
- Class: D
- League: Illinois–Missouri League

Team data
- Manager: Walter Diehl; Harry Horton; Doug Jeffries; Will Dithridge; William Hickey; Jack Herbert

The Pekin Celestials were an Illinois–Missouri League baseball team based in Pekin, Illinois, USA that played from 1909 to 1913.

In their very first season, the Celestials had four different managers. Two future major league baseball players played for them that year as well: Cecil Coombs and Mike Prendergast. Coombs played for them in 1910 as well. In 1911 and 1912, future big leaguers Jim Bluejacket and Patsy McGaffigan played for the Celestials. 1913 is the only year in which no known future big league players played for the Celestials.
