= Staunton Speakers =

- 1907–1908; Staunton, Illinois

Minor league affiliations
- Class: Class D (1908)
- League: Eastern Illinois League (1908)

Major league affiliations
- Team: None

Minor league titles
- League titles (1): 1908

Team data
- Name: Staunton Speakers (1908)
- Ballpark: Sporting Park (1908)

The Staunton Speakers were a minor league baseball team based in Staunton, Illinois in 1908. The Staunton Speakers played briefly as members of the Class D level Eastern Illinois League, which folded during the 1908 season. After relocating from Danville, Illinois, Staunton captured the Eastern Illinois League championship in the shortened season, hosting home games at Sporting Park.

== History ==
On July 17, 1908, the Danville Speakers franchise of the Class D level Eastern Illinois League moved to Staunton after compiling a record of 42–18 while based in Danville. The newly named "Staunton Speakers" joined the Charleston Evangelists, Mattoon Giants, Pana Coal Miners, Paris Parisians, Shelbyville Queen Citys, Taylorville Tailors and Vincennes Alices in the eight–team league.

After beginning league play in 1907, it was reported by the Associated Press that the Eastern Illinois League teams in Charleston, Mattoon, Pana and Paris were supported, “in great part from saloon interests.” This would soon affect Staunton and the other league members, as local prohibition soon occurred in the league cities.

During the 1908 Eastern Illinois League season, an evangelical movement led by former major league player Billy Sunday promoted a ballot item on April 7, 1908, that sought to abolish alcohol in the region. After the election, six of the Eastern Illinois League’s eight franchise cities had voted to become dry. After the elections, the league began to suffer financially, as Sunday games and financial support from saloons were eliminated. Affected by finances, the Charleston Evangelists and Mattoon Giants both folded on June 30, 1908, leaving six teams remaining in the Eastern Illinois League. On July 17, 1908, the Pana Coal Miners relocated to Linton, Indiana and the Danville Speakers moved to Staunton, Illinois in efforts to remain viable. Danville had a record of 42–18 at the time they relocated to Staunton.

After relocation, Staunton’s new team opened the second half of the season with a 6–1 win at Mattoon on Friday, July 17, 1908. In the Staunton home opener, a week later, some 600 fans, including the league president, were on hand for a 5–0 win over Linton. Home games at Sporting Park in Staunton began at 3:45PM and admission was .25 cents.

On August 20, 1908, the Shelbyville franchise folded with a record of 52–43. With five remaining teams, the Eastern Illinois League permanently folded on the same date.

When the Eastern Illinois League folded, the Danville/Staunton team was in first place with an overall record of 65–27, after compiling a 23–9 record in Staunton. The team played under manager Bill Dittridge in both cities. Staunton was followed by the Taylorville Tailors (56–39), Shelbyville Queen Citys (52–43), Vincennes Alices (47–48), Paris Parisians (43–48) and Pana Coal Miners/Linton (25–70) teams in the final league standings. The Charleston Evangelists (37–37) and Mattoon Giants (32–45) dissolved before the league folded.

Staunton, Illinois has not hosted another minor league team.

== The ballpark ==
Staunton played home minor league games at No. 6 Sporting Park. The ballpark was reportedly located in the southeastern portion of Staunton, Illinois.

Macoupin County Illinois and Stanunton, map location

== Year-by-year record ==
Year	Record	Finish	Manager	Playoffs/Notes
1908	65–27	1st	Bill Dittridge	Danville (42–18) moved to Staunton July 17; Team and league folded August 20; League champions

== Notable alumni ==
- Milo Netzel (1908)
- Ed Zmich (1908)
- Staunton Speakers players

== External references ==
- Team - Baseball Reference
