= Vincennes Alices =

- 1903–1913; (1896, 1903–1906, 1908, 1910–1911, 1913); Vincennes, Indiana

Minor league affiliations
- Class: Independent (1896); Class D (1903–1906, 1908, 1910–1911, 1913)
- League: Kentucky-Indiana League (1896); Kentucky-Illinois-Tennessee League (1903–1906); Eastern Illinois League (1908); Kentucky-Illinois-Tennessee League (1910–1911, 1913)

Major league affiliations
- Team: None

Minor league titles
- League titles (3): 1905; 1906; 1910
- Wild card berths (1): 1905

Team data
- Name: Vincennes (1896); Vincennes Alices (1903); Vincennes Reds (1904); Vincennes Alices (1905–1906 1908, 1910); Vincennes Hoosiers (1911); Vincennes Alices (1913)
- Ballpark: Columbia Park

The Vincennes Alices were a minor league baseball team based in Vincennes, Indiana.

After the "Vincennes" team was briefly a member of the 1896 Kentucky-Indiana League, the "Alices" played as members of the Class D level Kentucky-Illinois-Tennessee League in the league's seasons of play between 1903 and 1913, with one season in the 1908 Eastern Illinois League. The Alices won three league championships in 1905, 1906 and 1910. The Vincennes team played single seasons known as the "Reds" (1904) and Hoosiers" (1911).

The "Alices" nickname corresponds with the popular 1900 novel, Alice of Old Vincennes, the story of which was based in the city.

In the era, Vincennes hosted home minor league games at Columbia Park.

== History ==
=== 1903 to 1906 KITTY League ===
Minor league baseball in Vincennes, Indiana began in 1896. The "Vincennes" team briefly joined the Kentucky–Indiana League as members before folding. The league itself had folded and then restarted on June 22, 1896, with the Vincennes team as a league member on the restart. The Vincennes franchise quickly folded, and the Hopkinsville, Madisonville and Washington teams were added before the league restarted on July 1, 1896, without Vincennes.

In 1903, minor league baseball returned when the Vincennes "Alices" became charter members of the eight–team Class D level Kentucky–Illinois–Tennessee League, which was known informally as the KITTY League. The Cairo Egyptians, Clarksville Villagers, Henderson Hens, Hopkinsville Hoppers, Jackson Railroaders, Owensboro Distillers and Paducah Chiefs teams joined Vincennes in the newly formed league. The league began play on May 21, 1903.

The use of the "Alices" nickname corresponds with a popular book in the era, "Alice of Old Vincennes." The novel was written in 1900 by author Maurice Thompson. The setting in the novel was based in Vincennes, Indiana during the American Revolutionary War. Popular in the era of the minor league team, It was the tenth bestselling book in the United States in 1900, and the second best selling book in 1901. A native of the region, Maurice Thompson died in 1901, shortly after the publication of the book, at age 56. The "Alices" nickname was later given to the Vincennes Lincoln High School teams, beginning in 1923 and continues today.

In the first season of play in the new league, the Alices did not finish the league schedule. On June 22, 1903, Vincennes folded. At the time the team folded the Alices had a 11–18 record, playing the season under managers Harry Chaney and Jack Tuite. Owensboro also disbanded during the season and the Cairo Egyptians won the league championship.

Despite folding the previous season, the Vincennes "Reds" returned to play the 1904 six–team Class D level Kentucky–Illinois–Tennessee League and ended the season in last place. The Alices placed sixth in the Kentucky–Illinois–Tennessee League standings and compiled a record of 50–73, playing the season under managers Bill Popp and Luke Duffy. The Paducah Indians won the league championship and finished 23.5 games ahead of last place Vincennes.

In 1905, the Vincennes "Alices" continued Kentucky–Illinois–Tennessee League play and improved to finish as the league runner up, before winning a playoff for the championship. The Alices had a record of 65–41 under manager Eddie Kolb. With permission from the National Association, the league halted play on August 17, 1905, due to the Yellow Fever epidemic. The Paducah Indians were in first place, 4.5 games ahead of second place Vincennes when the league halted play. After the league stopped play, Vincennes and Paducah played a series for the championship. Vincennes defeated Paducah 7 games to 6 to win the Kentucky–Illinois–Tennessee title.

In the 1906 season, the Vincennes Alices again won the Kentucky–Illinois–Tennessee League championship in the six-team league. Vincennes won the league championship with a record of 79–49, led by returning manager Eddie Kolb. The Alices finished 9.0 games behind the second place Jacksonville Jacks in the final standings, as the league held no playoffs. Vincennes pitcher Hub Perdue led the league with 25 wins and 260 strikeouts and Phil Chenault had a 14–6 record.

=== 1908 Eastern Illinois League ===
After not playing in 1907, Vincennes joined the Class D level Eastern Illinois League in 1908 as the league expanded from six teams to eight teams. The Alices joined the Charleston Evangelists, Danville Speakers, Linton Coal Miners, Mattoon Giants, Pana Coal Miners, Paris Parisians, Shelbyville Queen Citys, Staunton Speakers and Taylorville Tailors teams in league play

The Alices ended their 1908 season with a 47–48 record and in second place, playing the season under managers Harry Lloyd and Orville Wolfe. Vincennes finished 19.5 games behind the first place Staunton Speakers in the final standings of the eight-team league. Vincennes pitcher Chet Carmichael had a league-leading 16–4 record. The Eastern Illinois league folded following the 1908 season.

=== 1910 to 1913 KITTY League ===
After not fielding a minor league team in 1909, the Vincennes Alices resumed play in 1910, as the Kentucky–Illinois–Tennessee League reformed. Vincennes joined the Clarksville Volunteers, Harrisburg Merchants, Hopkinsville Hoppers, McLeansboro Miners and Paducah Indians teams in the reformed league.

In returning to the Class D level Kentucky–Illinois–Tennessee League, the Vincennes Alices were the league champions. Vincennes placed first in the six-team standings, with a 64–54 record. Led by manager John Nairn, the Alices ended the season 7.5 games ahead of the second place Clarksville Volunteers team. Lyman Johnson led the league with both 20 victories and 182 strikeouts. Vincennes player/manager John Nairn led the league with a .285 batting average, teammates Arista DeHaven scored 54 runs and Walter Jantzen had 99 hits to top the league.

The Vincennes "Hoosiers" continued play as the 1911 Kentucky–Illinois–Tennessee League as expanded to become an eight-team league. On June 20, 1911, the McLeansboro Miners, with a 19–15 record moved to Henderson. The Hens placed third in the eight–team league with an overall record of 46–43. The team finished 12.0 games behind the first place Hopkinsville Hoppers. Miles Bradshaw and Stelle managed the McLeansboro/Henderson team in 1911.

Vincennes did not return to the 1912 Kentucky–Illinois–Tennessee League as the league reduced to a six-team league, won by the Clarksville Rebels in the six–team league.

Continuing Kentucky–Illinois–Tennessee League play, the league expanded into an eight-team league in 1913. The Vincennes Alices finished in a distant last place. With a record of 34–92, the team placed eighth in the standings under managers Ollie Pickering, Bob Anderson, William McAndrews and John Nairn. The Alices finished 45.5 games behind the champion Paducah Chiefs.

In 1914, the Kentucky–Illinois–Tennessee League reduced to six teams and the Vincennes franchise did not return to the league.

Vincennes next hosted minor league baseball in 1950. Following the 1949 season, the Belleville Stags of the Mississippi–Ohio Valley League moved to Vincennes and the Vincennes Citizens began play.

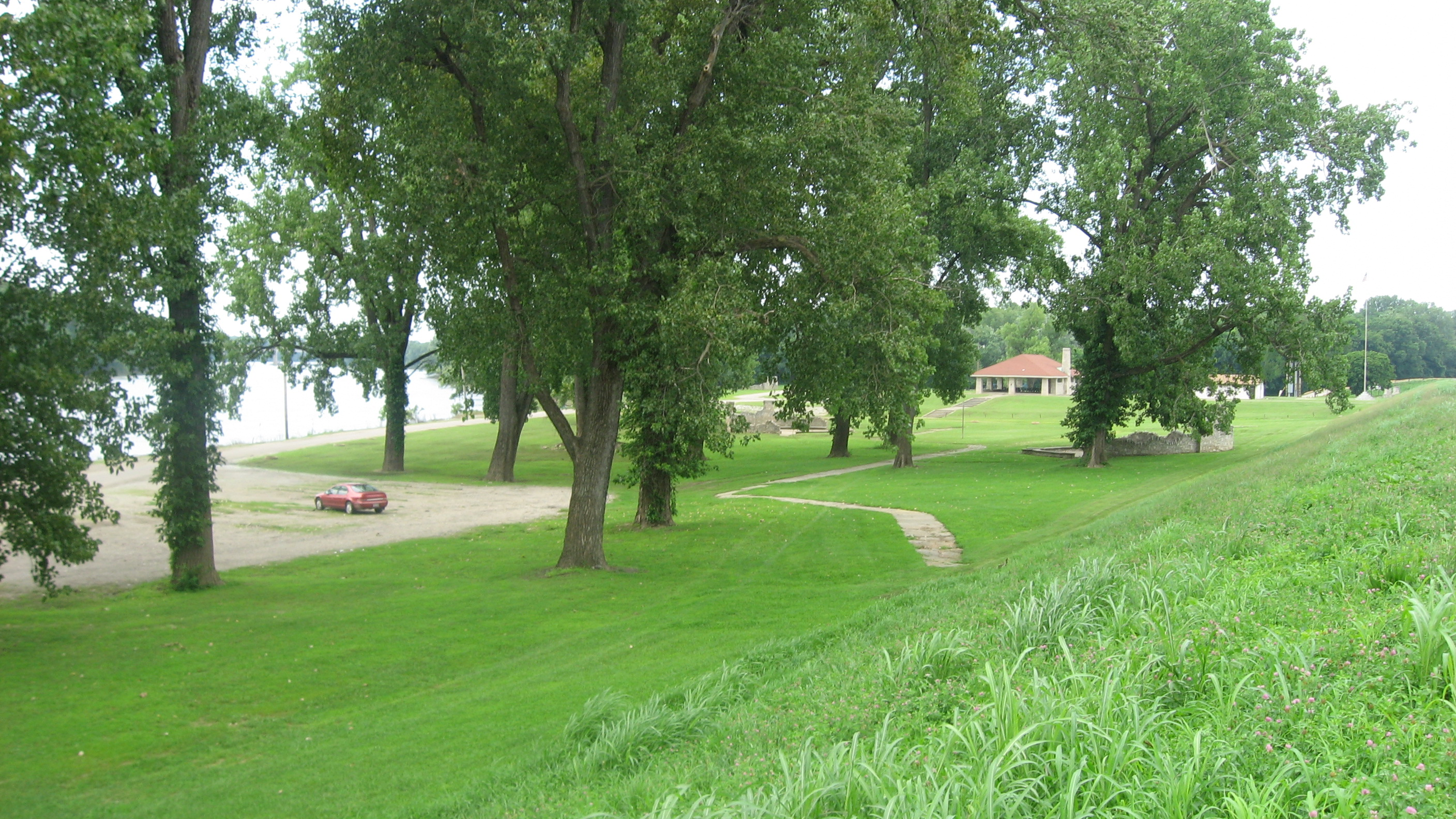
(2013) Kimmell Park. National Register of Historic Places. Vincennes, Indiana.

== The ballpark ==
Vincennes hosted minor league home games at Columbia Park, which was adjacent to Riverside Park in the era. The park sites were renamed to Kimmell Park in 1938. Today, Kimmel Park is still in use as a public park and has been listed on the National Register of Historic Places.

== Timeline ==
Year(s)	# Yrs.	Team	Level	League	Ballpark
1896	1	Vincennes	Independent	Kentucky-Indiana League	Columbia Park
1903	1	Vincennes Alices	Class D	Kentucky-Illinois-Tennessee League	Columbia Park
1904	1	Vincennes Reds	Class D	Kentucky-Illinois-Tennessee League	Columbia Park
1905–1906	2	Vincennes Alices	Class D	Kentucky-Illinois-Tennessee League	Columbia Park
1908	1	Vincennes Alices	Class D	Eastern Illinois League	Columbia Park
1910	1	Vincennes Alices	Class D	Kentucky-Illinois-Tennessee League	Columbia Park
1911	1	Vincennes Hoosiers	Class D	Kentucky-Illinois-Tennessee League	Columbia Park
1913	1	Vincennes Alices	Class D	Kentucky-Illinois-Tennessee League	Columbia Park

== Year–by–year records ==
Year	Record	Finish	Manager	Playoffs/notes
1896	00–00	NA	NA	League began play June 21; Team folded July 1
1903	11–18	NA	Harry Chaney / Jack Tuite	Team folded June 22
1904	50–73	6th	Bill Popp / Luke Duffy	No playoffs held
1905	65–41	2nd	Eddie Kolb	No playoffs held
1906	79–49	1st	Eddie Kolb	League champions No playoffs held
1908	47–48	4th	Harry Lloyd / Orville Wolfe	League folded August 20
1910	64–54	1st	John Nairn	League champions No playoffs held
1911	72–59	4th	Harry Hoyt	No playoffs held
1913	34–92	8th	Ollie Pickering Bob Anderson / William McAndrews / John Nairn	No playoffs held

== Notable alumni ==
- Zinn Beck (1908)
- Chet Carmichael (1908)
- Jim Duggan (1905)
- Charlie French (1905–1906)
- Harry Glenn (1910–1911)
- Clyde Goodwin (1904)
- Ed Hug (1904)
- Heinie Jantzen (1910–1911)
- Eddie Kolb (1905–1906)
- Hub Perdue (1905–1906)
- Ollie Pickering (1911; 1913, MGR)

== See also ==
- Vincennes Alices players
- Vincennes Citizens players
- Vincennes Hoosiers players
