= Taylorville Tailors =

- 1907–1908; (1907–1908, 1911); Taylorville, Illinois

Minor league affiliations
- Class: Class D (1907–1908, 1911)
- League: Eastern Illinois League (1907–1908); Illinois-Missouri League (1911)

Major league affiliations
- Team: None

Minor league titles
- League titles (0): None

Team data
- Name: Taylorville Tailors (1907–1908); Taylorville Christians (1911)
- Ballpark: Manners Park* (1907–1908, 1911)

The Taylorville Tailors were a minor league baseball team based in Taylorville, Illinois. The Tailors teams played as members of the Class D level Eastern Illinois League in 1907 and 1908. Following the folding of the Eastern Illinois League, the 1911 Taylorville "Christians" played the season as members of the Class D level Illinois-Missouri League.

== History ==
The 1907 Taylorville Tailors began minor league play as charter members of the Eastern Illinois League. The league was formed under league president L. A. G. Shoaff as a six–team, Class D level league. The 1908 Spalding Guide indicated the league was founded in Pana, Illinois and the league's "godfather" was Joe Adams, also known as "Old Wagon Tongue," who would later manage the 1911 Taylorville team. In 1907 the league teams had a salary limit of $600 for their rosters. The Centralia White Stockings, Charleston Broom Corn Cutters, Mattoon Giants, Pana Coal Miners and Shelbyville Queen Citys joined Taylorville as charter members of the league.

After beginning league play on May 12, 1907, the Taylorville Tailors finished the 1907 Eastern Illinois League season in third place in the six–team league. The Tailors finished with a 60–58 record under managers Phil Ketter and Billy Ryan. Ketter led the Eastern Illinois league in hitting (.284) and in hits with 111. Taylorville finished 14.0 games behind the first place Mattoon Giants in the final Eastern Illinois League standings.

Taylorville continued play in the 1908 Eastern Illinois League, but the league folded during the season. An evangelical movement led by former major league player Billy Sunday promoted a ballot item on April 7, 1908, that sought to abolish alcohol in the region. After the election, six of the Eastern Illinois League’s eight franchise cities voted to become dry and the league began to suffer financially, as Sunday games and support from saloons were eliminated. Affected by finances, the Charleston Evangelists and Mattoon Giants folded on June 30, 1908, leaving six teams. On July 17, 1908, the Pana Coal Miners relocated to Linton, Indiana and the Danville Speakers moved to Staunton, Illinois in efforts to remain viable. On August 20, 1908, the Shelbyville franchise folded, and the Eastern Illinois League permanently folded on the same date. Playing under managers Walter Diehl and Billy Ryan, Taylorville was in second place with a 56–39 record, 10.5 games behind the first place Staunton team when the league permanently folded.

Taylorville returned a team to minor league baseball play in 1911, when the "Taylorville Christians" became members of the Class D level Illinois-Missouri League and finished last in their only season of play. The Christians ended the season with a 47–82 record to place sixth in the six–team league. Taylorville finished 27.0 games behind the first place Clinton Champs, playing their final season under managers Fred Donovan, Joe Adams and Oscar Denny.

The Taylorville franchise did not return to the Illinois-Missouri league in 1912. Taylorville, Illinois has not hosted another minor league team.

== The ballpark ==
The name of the Taylorville home minor league ballpark is not directly referenced. Since the late 1850's, the Manners Park site has served as a public park in Taylorville and was in use in the era. Manners Park is still in use today, with "several ballfields." The park is located at 18 Manners Park Road in Taylorville, Illinois.

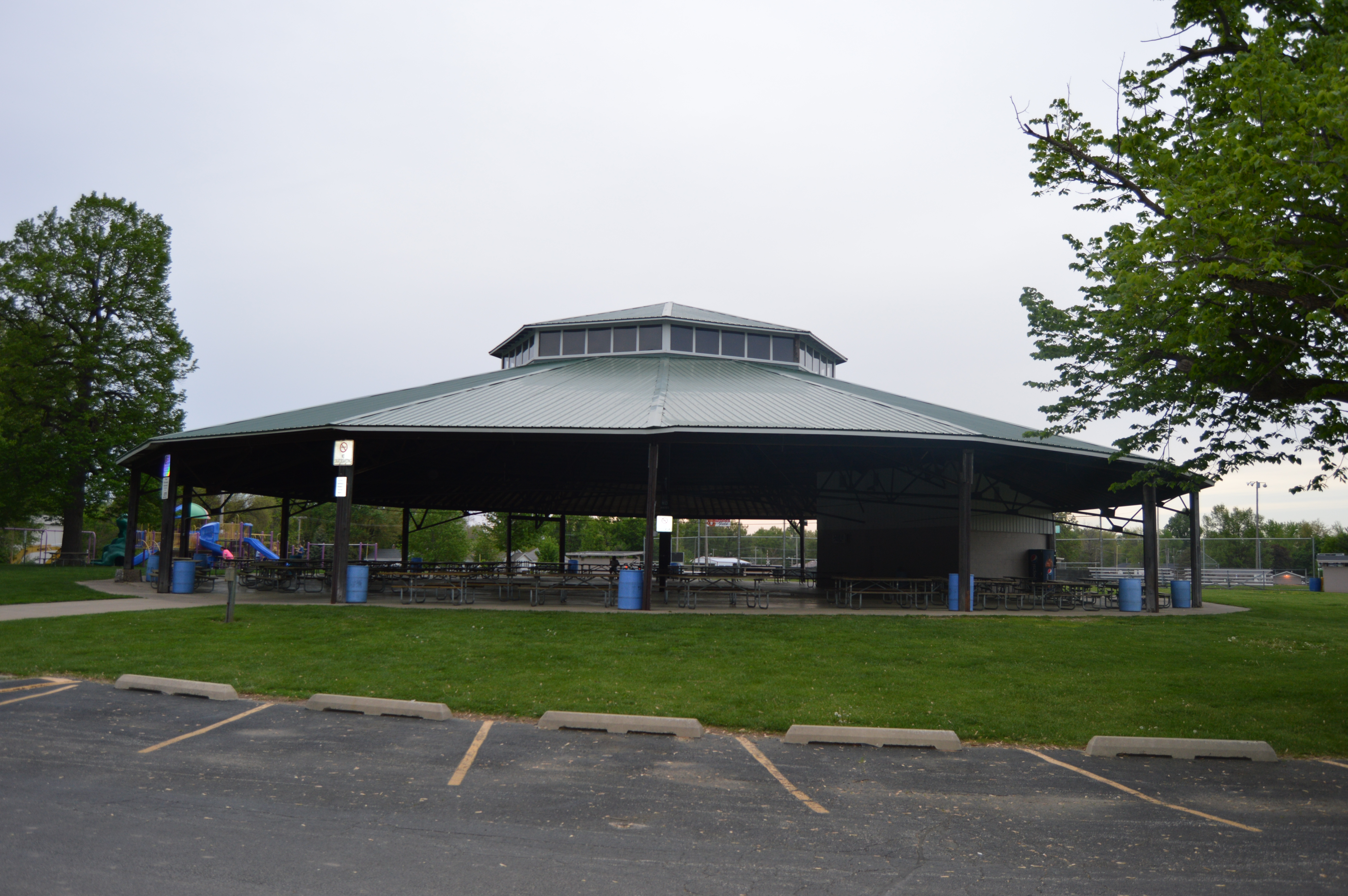
(2014) Chautauqua Auditorium, Manners Park. National Register of Historic Places. Taylorville, Illinois

== Timeline ==
Year(s)	# Yrs.	Team	Level	League
1907–1908	2	Taylorville Tailors	Class D	Eastern Illinois League
1911	1	Taylorville Christians	Class D	Illinois-Missouri League

== Year–by–year records ==
Year	Record	Finish	Manager	Playoffs/Notes
1907	60–58	3rd	Phil Ketter / Billy Ryan	No playoffs held
1908	56–39	2nd	Walter Diehl / Billy Ryan	League folded August 20
1911	47–82	6th	Fred Donovan / Joe Adams / Oscar Denny	No playoffs held

== Notable alumni ==
- Joe Adams (1911, MGR)
- Coonie Blank (1911)
- Fred Donovan (1911)
- Elmer Johnson (1908)
- Phil Ketter (1907, MGR)
- Art Phelan (1908)
- Ray Schalk (1911)

== See also ==
Taylorville Tailors players
Taylorville Christians players

== External references ==
- Taylorville - Baseball Reference
