= Eastern Illinois League =

The Eastern Illinois League was a Class-D league in Minor League Baseball that existed during the 1907 and 1908 baseball seasons. The league president as of 1907 was L. A. G. Shoaff. According to the 1908 Spalding Guide, the league got its start in Pana, IL and the league's "godfather" was Joe Adams, also known as "Old Wagon Tongue." In 1907, teams had a salary limit of $600.

== Cities represented ==
- Centralia, Illinois: Centralia White Stockings (1907)
- Charleston, Illinois: Charleston Broom Corn Cutters (1907); Charleston Evangelists (1908)
- Danville, Illinois: Danville Speakers (1908)
- Linton, Indiana: Linton (1908)
- Mattoon, Illinois: Mattoon Giants (1907-1908)
- Pana, Illinois: Pana Coal Miners (1907-1908)
- Paris, Illinois: Paris Colts (1907); Paris Parisians (1908)
- Shelbyville, Illinois: Shelbyville Queen Citys (1907-1908)
- Staunton, Illinois: Staunton Speakers (1908)
- Taylorville, Illinois: Taylorville Tailors (1907-1908)
- Vincennes, Indiana: Vincennes Alices (1908)

== Standings & statistics ==
=== 1907 Eastern Illinois League ===
President: Charles Welvert / L.A.G. Schoaff

Team standings	W	L	PCT	GB	Managers
Mattoon Giants	74	24	.627	--	Hank O'Day
Charleston Broom Corn Cutters	71	49	.592	4	Nig Langdon
Taylorville Tailors	60	58	.508	14	Phil Ketter / Mike Ryan
Centralia White Stockings / Paris Colts	51	67	.432	23	Red Kelly / Bob Shaw
Pana Coal Miners	51	70	.421	24½	Joe Adams
Shelbyville Queen Citys	50	69	.420	24½	J.B. Young

Centralia (6-27) moved to Paris June 20.

Player	Team	Stat	Tot
Phil Ketter	Taylorville	BA	.284
Bill Bartley	Charleston	Runs	51
Phil Ketter	Taylorville	Hits	111
Andy Lotshaw	Charleston	HR	10
Grover Lowdermilk	Mattoon	W	33
Grover Lowdermilk	Mattoon	SO	458
Grover Lowdermilk	Mattoon	ERA	0.93

=== 1908 Eastern Illinois League ===
President: L.A.G. Schoaff

Team standings	W	L	PCT	GB	Managers
Danville Speakers / Staunton	65	27	.707	--	W.C. Dithridge
Taylorville Tailors	56	39	.589	10½	Mike Ryan
Shelbyville Queen Citys	52	43	.547	14½	Joe Adams
Vincennes Alices	47	48	.495	19½	Pop Lloyd
Paris Parisians	43	48	.473	21½	Erickstone / Eckson / Dan Jenkins / Skipper Roberts
Pana Coal Miners / Linton	25	70	.263	41½	Sunday Hawker / Nig Langdon / Butts
Mattoon Giants	32	45	.416	NA	Lefty Russell / George Kizer
Charleston Evangelists	37	37	.500	NA	Kid Madden

Pana (18-44) moved to Linton July 17, for the second half.
Danville (42-18) moved to Staunton July 17, for the second half.
Charleston and Mattoon disbanded July 30.
Shelbyville disbanded August 20, causing the league to disband.

Player	Team	Stat	Tot
Art Ahring	Charleston	BA	.355
Tom Fleming	Dan/Sta	Runs	57
Buck Stanley	Paris	Hits	93
Andy Biltz	Shelbyville	HR	6
Ralph Grimes	Dan/Sta	W	19
Joe Jenkins	Par/Pan/Sta	SO	139
Chet Carmichael	Vincennes	Pct	.800; 16-4

== Sources ==
The Encyclopedia of Minor League Baseball:Second Edition.
