= 1902 St. Louis Cardinals season =

Major League Baseball season

1902 St. Louis Cardinals
- League: National League
- Ballpark: League Park
- City: St. Louis, Missouri
- Record: 56–78 (.418)
- League place: 6th
- Owners: Frank Robison and Stanley Robison
- Managers: Patsy Donovan

The 1902 St. Louis Cardinals season was the team's 21st season in St. Louis, Missouri and its 11th season in the National League. The Cardinals went 56–78 during the season and finished sixth in the National League.

== Regular season ==
Due to the loss of Bobby Wallace and Jesse Burkett to the St. Louis Browns, the Cardinals went from a team with 76 wins and 64 losses in 1901 to a team that finished 1902 with 56 wins and 78 defeats.

=== Season standings ===
National League
Team	W	L	Pct.	GB	Home	Road
Pittsburgh Pirates	103	36	.741	—	56‍–‍15	47‍–‍21
Brooklyn Superbas	75	63	.543	27½	45‍–‍23	30‍–‍40
Boston Beaneaters	73	64	.533	29	42‍–‍27	31‍–‍37
Cincinnati Reds	70	70	.500	33½	35‍–‍35	35‍–‍35
Chicago Orphans	68	69	.496	34	31‍–‍38	37‍–‍31
St. Louis Cardinals	56	78	.418	44½	28‍–‍38	28‍–‍40
Philadelphia Phillies	56	81	.409	46	29‍–‍39	27‍–‍42
New York Giants	48	88	.353	53½	24‍–‍44	24‍–‍44

=== Record vs. opponents ===
1902 National League record Sources:
Team	BSN	BRO	CHC	CIN	NYG	PHI	PIT	STL
Boston	—	8–12	11–9	11–9	16–3	11–9–1	6–14–1	10–8–3
Brooklyn	12–8	—	12–8	12–8	10–10	13–6	6–14–1	10–9–2
Chicago	9–11	8–12	—	12–8–1	10–10–4	10–10	7–13	12–5–1
Cincinnati	9–11	8–12	8–12–1	—	14–6	13–7	5–15	13–7
New York	3–16	10–10	10–10–4	6–14	—	6–12	6–13–1	7–13
Philadelphia	9–11–1	6–13	10–10	7–13	12–6	—	2–18	10–10
Pittsburgh	14–6–1	14–6–1	13–7	15–5	13–6–1	18–2	—	16–4
St. Louis	8–10–3	9–10–2	5–12–1	7–13	13–7	10–10	4–16	—

=== Roster ===
1902 St. Louis Cardinals
Roster
Pitchers: Joe Adams; Clarence Currie; Wiley Dunham; Jim Hackett; Chappie McFarland; Ed Murphy; Mike O'Neill; Alex Pearson; Bill Popp; Bob Wicker; Stan Yerkes	Catchers: Jack O'Neill; Jack Ryan; Art Weaver; Infielders: Roy Brashear; Jack Calhoun; John Farrell; Fred Hartman; Doc Hazleton; Rudy Kling; Otto Krueger; John Murphy; Art Nichols; Otto Williams	Outfielders: George Barclay; Patsy Donovan; Homer Smoot	Manager: Patsy Donovan

== Player stats ==
=== Batting ===
==== Starters by position ====
Note: Pos = Position; G = Games played; AB = At bats; H = Hits; Avg. = Batting average; HR = Home runs; RBI = Runs batted in

Pos	Player	G	AB	H	Avg.	HR	RBI
C	Jack Ryan	76	267	48	.180	0	14
1B	Roy Brashear	110	388	107	.276	1	40
2B	John Farrell	138	565	141	.250	0	25
3B	Fred Hartman	114	416	90	.216	0	52
SS	Otto Krueger	128	467	124	.266	0	46
OF	Homer Smoot	129	518	161	.311	3	48
OF	George Barclay	137	543	163	.300	3	53
OF	Patsy Donovan	126	502	158	.315	0	35

==== Other batters ====
Note: G = Games played; AB = At bats; H = Hits; Avg. = Batting average; HR = Home runs; RBI = Runs batted in

Player	G	AB	H	Avg.	HR	RBI
Art Nichols	73	251	67	.267	1	31
Jack O'Neill	63	192	27	.141	0	12
Jack Calhoun	20	64	10	.156	0	8
Art Weaver	11	33	6	.182	0	3
Doc Hazleton	7	23	3	.130	0	0
Rudy Kling	4	10	2	.200	0	0
Otto Williams	2	5	2	.400	0	2
John Murphy	1	3	2	.667	0	1

=== Pitching ===
==== Starting pitchers ====
Note: G = Games pitched; IP = Innings pitched; W = Wins; L = Losses; ERA = Earned run average; SO = Strikeouts

Player	G	IP	W	L	ERA	SO
Mike O'Neill	36	288.1	16	15	2.90	105
Stan Yerkes	39	272.2	12	21	3.66	81
Ed Murphy	23	164.0	10	6	3.02	37
Bob Wicker	22	152.1	5	12	3.19	78
Clarence Currie	15	124.2	7	5	2.60	30
Alex Pearson	11	82.0	2	6	3.95	24
Bill Popp	9	60.1	2	6	4.92	20
Jim Hackett	4	30.1	0	3	6.23	7

==== Other pitchers ====
Note: G = Games pitched; IP = Innings pitched; W = Wins; L = Losses; ERA = Earned run average; SO = Strikeouts

Player	G	IP	W	L	ERA	SO
Wiley Dunham	7	38.0	2	3	5.68	15
Chappie McFarland	2	11.0	0	1	5.73	3

==== Relief pitchers ====
Note: G = Games pitched; W = Wins; L = Losses; SV = Saves; ERA = Earned run average; SO = Strikeouts

Player	G	W	L	SV	ERA	SO
Joe Adams	1	0	0	0	9.00	0
