= Shelbyville Queen Citys =

Minor league baseball team (1907–1908)

- 1907–1908; Shelbyville, Illinois

Minor league affiliations
- Class: Class D (1907–1908)
- League: Eastern Illinois League (1907–1908)

Team data
- Ballpark: Forest Park* (1907–1908)

The Shelbyville Queen Citys were a minor league baseball team based in Shelbyville, Illinois. In 1907 and 1908, the Shelbyville Queen Citys played exclusively as members of the Class D level Eastern Illinois League and hosted home games at Forest Park.

== History ==
Minor league baseball began in Shelbyville, when the 1907 Shelbyville "Queen Citys" became charter members of the Eastern Illinois League. The league was formed under the leadership of league president L. A. G. Shoaff as a six-team Class D level league. The 1908 Spalding Guide indicated the league was founded in Pana, Illinois and the league's "godfather" was Joe Adams, also known as "Old Wagon Tongue," who would later manage the Shelbyville team. In 1907, Shelbyville and the other league teams had a salary limit of $600 for their rosters. The Centralia White Stockings, Charleston Broom Corn Cutters, Mattoon Giants, Pana Coal Miners and Taylorville Tailors joined Shelbyville as charter members of the league.

The use of the "Queen Citys" nickname corresponds with Shelbyville being referred to as the "Queen City" in the region.

After beginning league play on May 12, 1907, the Shelbyville Queen Citys finished the 1907 Eastern Illinois League season in last place in the six-team league. The Queen Citys finished with a 50–69 record playing under six managers during the season. Bob Higgins, C.S. Walls, Harry Patton, Kling, Pearl Holycross and Edward Doak all served time as managers of the team. Shelbyville ended the season 24.5 games behind the first place Mattoon Giants in the final Eastern Illinois League standings.

It was reported by the Associated Press that the Eastern Illinois League teams in Charleston, Mattoon, Pana and Paris were supported, “In great part from saloon interests.” This would soon affect Shelbyville and the other league members, as local prohibition would soon occur in the league cities.

Shelbyville continued play in the 1908 Eastern Illinois League but the team folded during the season.

An evangelical movement led by former major league player Billy Sunday promoted a ballot item on April 7, 1908, that sought to abolish alcohol in the region. After the election, six of the Eastern Illinois League’s eight franchise cities voted to become dry and the league began to suffer financially, as Sunday games and support from saloons were eliminated.

Affected by finances, the Charleston Evangelists and Mattoon Giants folded on June 30, 1908, leaving six teams. On July 17, 1908, the Pana Coal Miners relocated to Linton, Indiana and the Danville Speakers moved to Staunton, Illinois in efforts to remain viable. On August 20, 1908, the Shelbyville franchise folded. Andy Biltz of Shelbyville was leading the league in home runs with 6. Shelbyville had a record of 52–43 under manager Joe Adams when the franchise folded. With five remaining teams, the Eastern Illinois League permanently folded on the same date. Shelbyville was in third place, 14.5 games behind the first place Staunton team when the league permanently folded.

The Eastern Illinois League did not return to play in 1909. Shelbyville, Illinois has not hosted another minor league team.

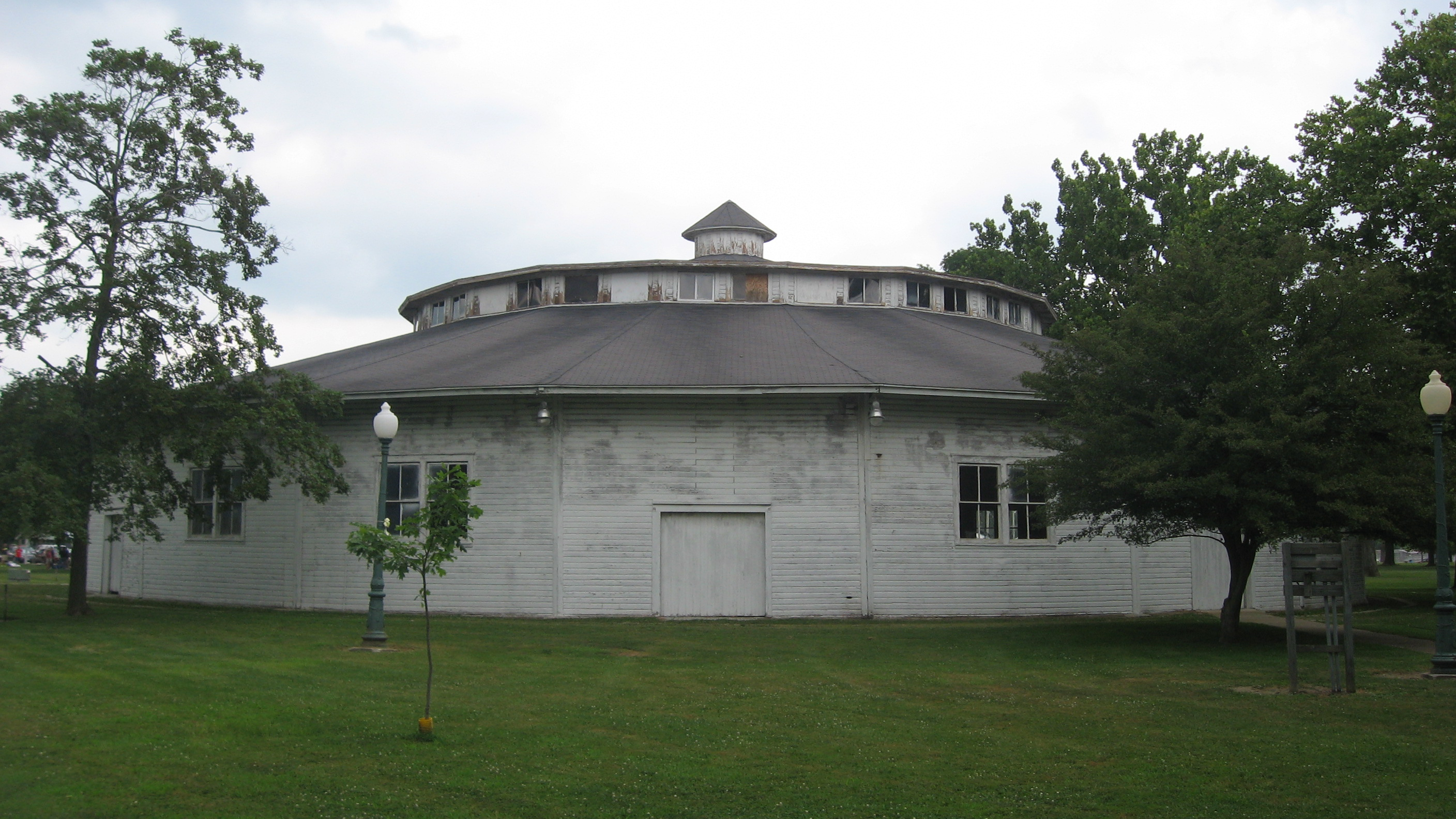
(2013) Shelbyville Chautauqua Auditorium in Forest Park. The icosahedral structure was built in 1903. National Register of Historic Places. Shelbyville, Illinois.

== The ballpark ==
The name of the Shelbyville Queen Citys ballpark is not directly referenced. As the only public park in Shelbyville in the era, Forest Park hosted the public events in the city in the era. Still in use today as a public park, Forest Park was first established in 1857 and has been home to a fairgrounds, a horse racing track, a public pool, an aquarium and other amenities in its existence. The Chautauqua Auditorium is located within Forest Park and is listed on the National Register of Historic Places. Still in use today as a municipal park, with baseball and softball fields, Forest Park is located on North East 9th Street in Shelbyville.

== Timeline ==
Year(s)	# Yrs.	Team	Level	League
1907–1908	2	Shelbyville Queen Citys	Class D	Eastern Illinois League

== Year–by–year records ==
Year	Record	Finish	Manager	Playoffs/Notes
1907	50–69	6th	Bob Higgins / C.S. Walls / Harry Patton / Kling / Pearl Holycross / Edward Doak	No playoffs held
1908	52–43	3rd	Joe Adams	Team and league folded August 20

== Notable alumni ==
- Joe Adams (1908, MGR)
- Cecil Coombs (1907–1908)
- Bob Higgins (1907, player/MGR)
- Lou Lowdermilk (1907)
- Harry Patton (1907)
- Larry Pratt (1907)
- Hosea Siner (1907)

== See also ==
- Shelbyville Queen Citys players
