= Charles M. Conlon =

American photographer (1868–1945)

- Born: November 28, 1868; Albany, New York, U.S.
- Died: June 2, 1945 (aged 76); Troy, New York, U.S.
- Occupation: Baseball photographer

Charles Martin Conlon (November 28, 1868 – June 2, 1945) was an American photographer born in Albany, New York who grew up in the neighboring city of Troy.

Conlon started his career working for New York City newspapers in the early 1900s, as a proof-reader, and took up landscape photography as a hobby. New York Evening Telegram editor John B. Foster, who also produced the annual "Spalding Base Ball Guide", asked Conlon to take photographs of the players for the well known annual. Conlon later wrote in The Sporting News that Foster “came to know about my hobby—taking pictures. He said to me one day, ‘Charley, they need pictures of ball players for the Guide, and there is no reason why you can’t take pictures of the players, as well as landscapes. It will be a good pickup for you, and it will be something for a day off.”

Conlon used a Graflex View camera and large format glass plate negatives before switching to film, in all he created at least 30,000 images over his career that spanned 1904–1941. Most of his archive consisted of thousands of portraits of major league baseball players, however his most famous photo is a fortunate action shot of Ty Cobb sliding into third base at Hilltop Park in 1910, upending the fielder, Jimmy Austin. This photo, and many of his images, of baseball's early stars are instantly recognizable, due to having been frequently reprinted over the years and the subject of several books, trading cards and documentaries. The Cobb photo is considered the first "action" sports photo.

== The Cobb photo ==
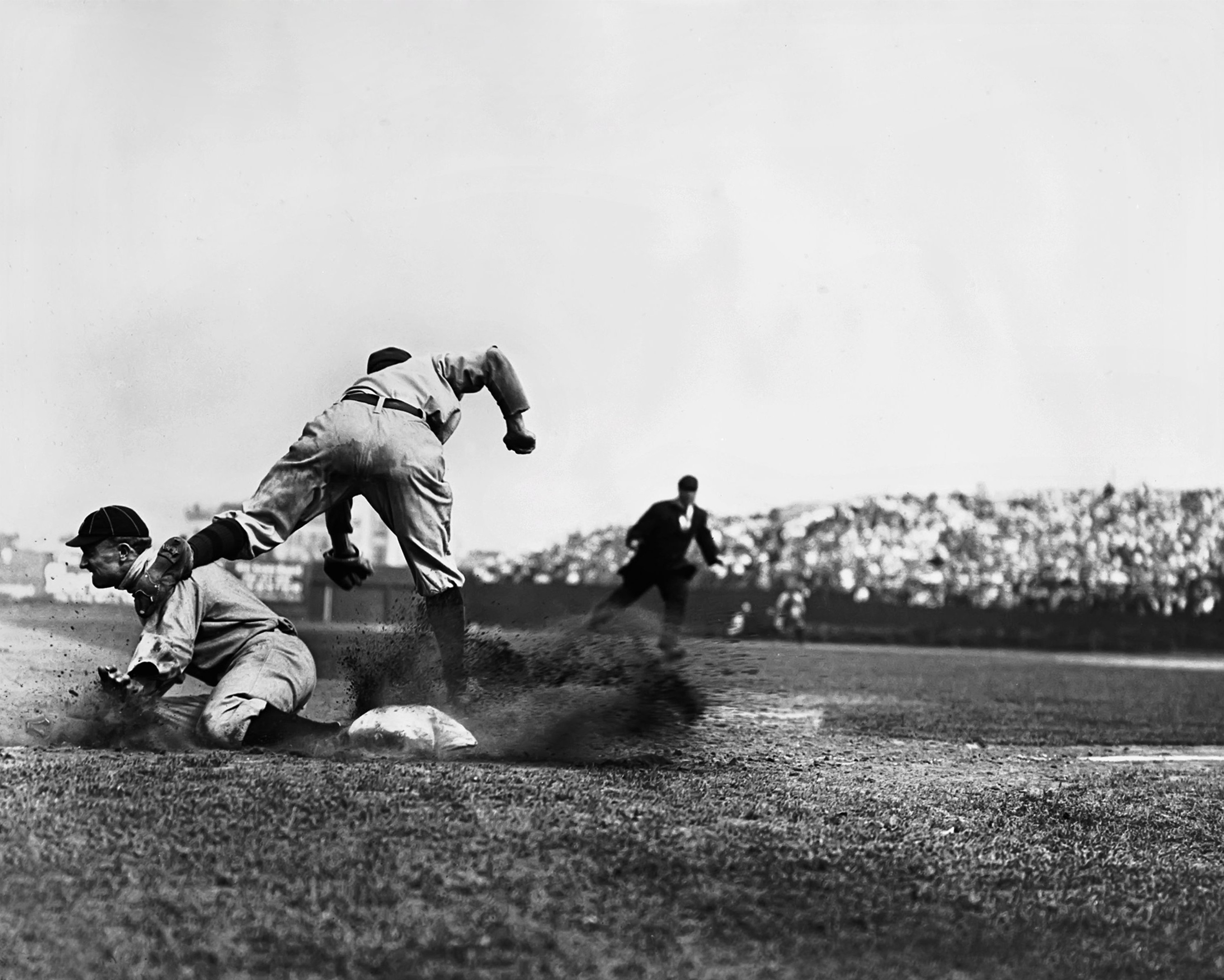
Conlon's most famous picture: Ty Cobb stealing third, sliding into Jimmy Austin

On July 23, 1910, Conlon snapped an action photo of Cobb sliding into third. For publication, the original photo was cropped on the right, taking away almost half of the image. That is the version everyone saw until Baseball's Golden Age: The Photographs of Charles M. Conlon was published in 1993. The excised portion is included and shows more of the right-side bleachers, as well as the left arm of the third base coach.

Conlon was actually on the field, being a common practice of the day, "behind third base, under the hood of a large, tripod-supported Graflex camera". He was positioned to the outfield side of the third base coach's box, in foul territory. Cobb was on second. New York third baseman Jimmy Austin was playing in for a possible sacrifice bunt. Cobb took off for third, directly toward Conlon, but batter Sam Crawford did not get the bunt down. Austin backpedaled to take the throw from the catcher. Cobb tipped Austin over and the throw from catcher Fred Mitchell sailed away into left field. Cobb got up and scored on the throwing error.

Initially, there was a question as to whether Conlon got the shot or not. He changed plates, just to be safe, because he did not remember if he had squeezed the shutter bulb or not, and he knew it had potential to be a great shot. It turned out that he had, it was, and baseball had one of its most iconic images.

Conlon however did not see much of a financial reward from his most famous image. In 1937, Conlon estimated he had received more than 1,000 royalty payments for the famous image, however these all ranged from only a dime to 50 cents. Many of his most famous photos now sell for five figures.

== Later life and death ==
Conlon destroyed possibly thousands of his original glass plate negatives to clear space in his small home, stating in 1937 that "[s]ome years ago, I found that my plates were running me out of the house, so I destroyed hundreds of them. Perhaps it was a mistake, but where would I have kept them? It is possible that had we had a Cooperstown museum at the time, they would have found a haven there."

Conlon retired to his hometown of Troy and died in 1945, predeceased by his wife and having no children or siblings.

== The Sporting News / John Rogers fraud ==
After his death, the archive of 8,300 negatives, less than one third of the total number of images he created, was owned by The Sporting News before it was sold in 2010 to North Little Rock, Arkansas collector and businessman John Rogers. Rogers was arrested on multiple charges including fraud surrounding sports memorabilia and several newspaper and famous photographers' archives, including the Conlon Collection, in 2016 after his home and office was raided in 2013. In December 2015, an Arkansas judge ruled the negatives could be sold to pay off some of the millions of dollars in debt owed by Rogers. The archive, now consisting of 7,462 negatives with no record of where the missing negatives went while in Rogers' possession, was sold by Heritage Auctions in August 2016 for $1,792,500. Rogers was also sued by several newspapers and the family of George Burke for fraud as thousands of original negatives from several archives have come up missing.
