= Pana Coal Miners =

Minor league baseball team (1907–1908)

- 1907–1908; Pana, Illinois

Minor league affiliations
- Class: Class D (1907–1908)
- League: Eastern Illinois League (1907–1908)

Major league affiliations
- Team: None

Minor league titles
- League titles (0): None

Team data
- Name: Pana Coal Miners (1907–1908)
- Ballpark: Kitchell Park (1907–1908)

The Pana Coal Miners were a minor league baseball team based in Pana, Illinois. In 1907 and 1908, the Coal Miners played exclusively as members of the Class D level Eastern Illinois League. Pana hosted home minor league home games at Kitchell Park.

== History ==
Minor league baseball began in Pana, Illinois when the 1907 Pana Coal Miners became charter members of the Eastern Illinois League, which began play as a six–team Class D level league under league president L. A. G. Shoaff. The 1908 Spalding Guide indicated the league was founded in Pana, Illinois and the league's "godfather" was Joe Adams, also known as "Old Wagon Tongue," who would manage Pana.

In 1907, Pana and the other league teams had a salary limit of $600. The Centralia White Stockings, Charleston Broom Corn Cutters, Mattoon Giants, Shelbyville Queen Citys, and Taylorville Tailors joined Pana as the charter members of the league.

The use of the "Coal Miners" nickname corresponds to local industry, as coal mining was prevalent in the Panaarea during the era. The Pana riot, a mine worker conflict, had occurred on April 10, 1899, resulting in seven deaths.

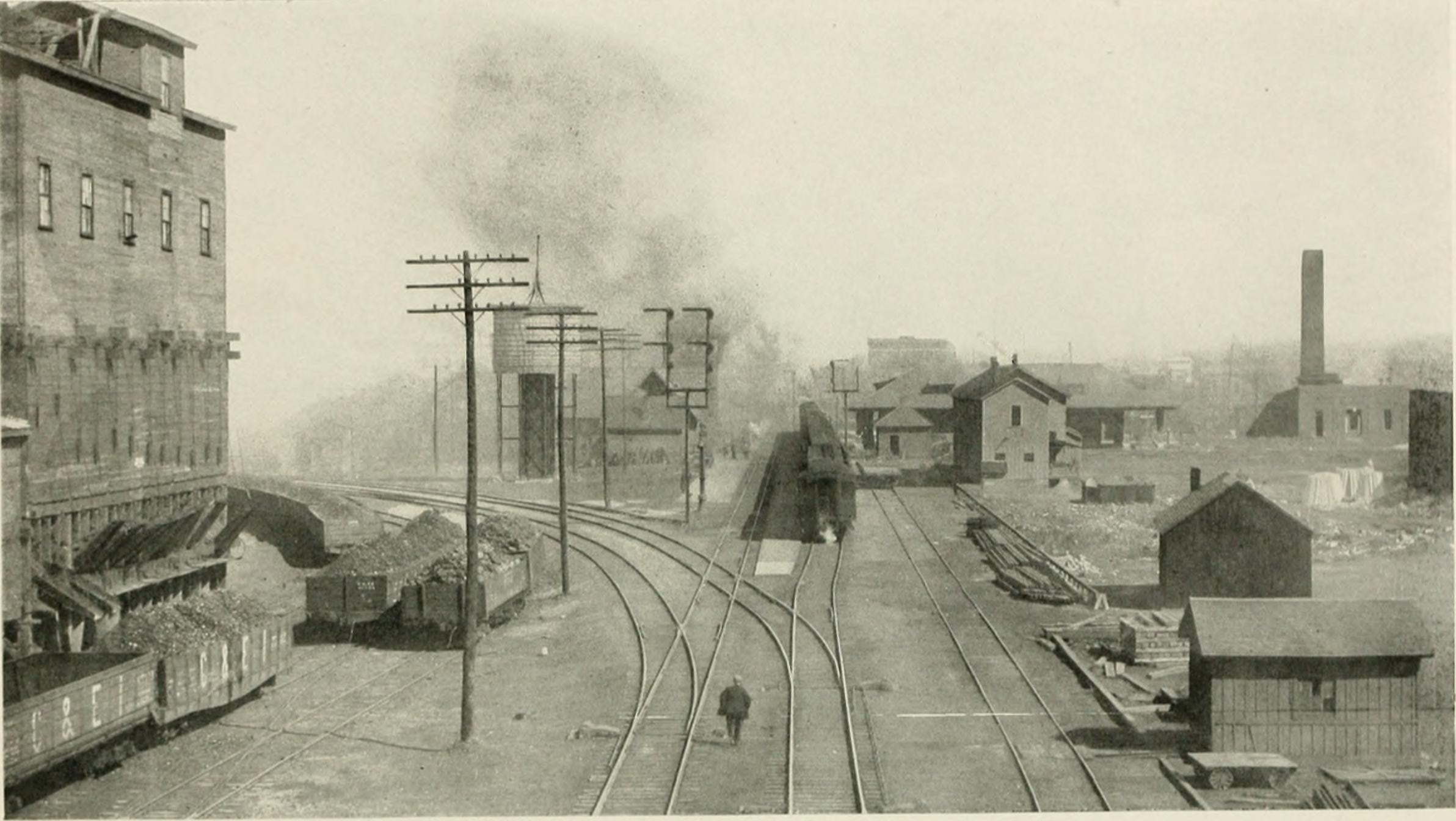
(1913) Railroad yard coal cars. Pana, Illinois

In August 1907, in a series between the Coal Miners and the Mattoon Giants, it was reported in The Sporting Life that Mattoon second baseman Fred Wilson repeatedly punched Pana manager Joe Adams during a dispute. “Wilson put Adams down with a straight jab on the jaw. The manager came up, but another blow in the same place fractured his chewing apparatus,” said the report.

After beginning league play on May 12, 1907, the Pana Coal Miners finished the season in fifth place in the six-team league. The Coal Miners finished with a 51–70 record, playing under Adams. Pana finished 24.5 games behind first place Mattoon.

It was reported by the Associated Press that the Eastern Illinois League teams in Charleston, Mattoon, Pana and Paris were supported, “in great part from saloon interests.”

Pana continued play in the 1908 Eastern Illinois League but relocated during the season.

An evangelical movement led by former major league player Billy Sunday promoted a ballot item on April 7, 1908 that sought to abolish alcohol in the region. After the election, six of the Eastern Illinois League’s eight franchise cities voted to become dry, and the league began to suffer financially as Sunday games and support from saloons was eliminated.

On May 27, 1908, Neil Connaughton of Pana pitched a no-hitter in a 2–1 victory over the Paris Parisians.

The 1908 Pana Coal Miners relocated in what was the final season of play for Pana. On July 17, 1908, the Pana franchise relocated to Linton, Indiana. The Coal Miners had an 18–44 record at the time of the move. After compiling a 7–26 record while based in Linton, the Pana/Linton team finished the season with an overall record of 25–70 under managers A.S. Hawker, Nig Landon, and Al Holycross, placing last of the six remaining league teams.

After the 1908 season, the Eastern Illinois League permanently folded. Pana has not hosted another minor league team.

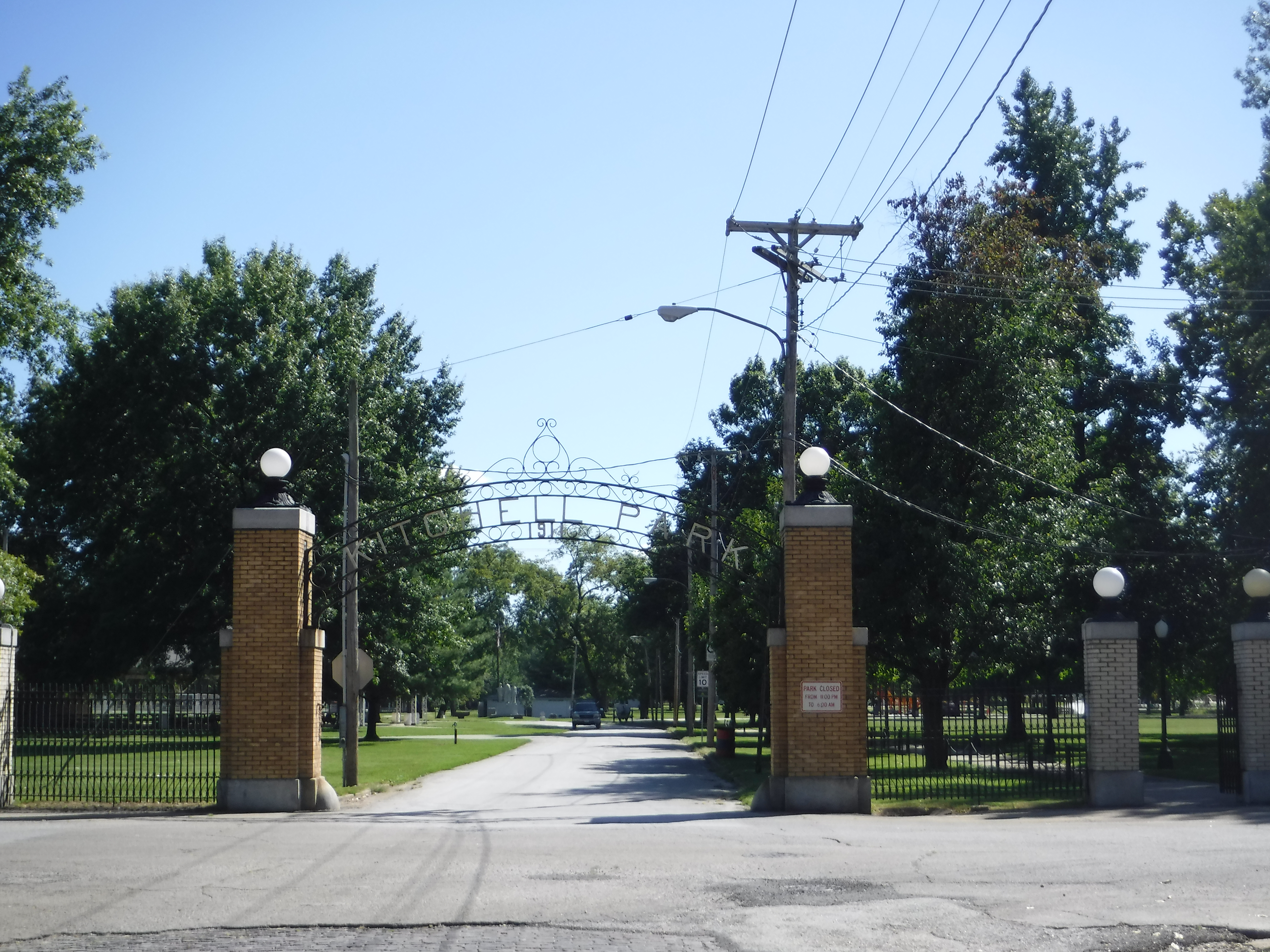
(2018) Entrance to Kitchell Park. National Register of Historic Places. Pana, Illinois

== Ballpark ==
The Pana Coal Miners played home minor league games at Kitchell Park, which is listed on the National Register of Historic Places. Still in use today as a public park with baseball fields and other amenities, Kitchell Park is located at Ninth Street and Kitchell Street in Pana.

== Timeline ==
| Year(s) | # Yrs. | Team | Level | League | Ballpark |
|---|---|---|---|---|---|
| 1907–1908 | 2 | Pana Coal Miners | Class D | Eastern Illinois League | Kitchell Park |

== Year-by-year records ==
| Year | Record | Finish | Manager | Playoffs/notes |
|---|---|---|---|---|
| 1907 | 51–70 | 5th | Joe Adams | None played |
| 1908 | 25–70 | 6th | A.S. Hawker / Nig Landon / Al Holycross | Moved to Linton July 17 (18–44) |

== Notable alumni ==
- Joe Adams (1907, MGR)
- Pana Coal Miners players

== External references ==
- Pana - Baseball Reference
