= Charleston, Illinois, minor league baseball history =

Charleston, Illinois minor league baseball teams
- 1906–1908; Charleston, Illinois

Minor league affiliations
- Class: Class D (1906–1908)
- League: Kentucky–Illinois–Tennessee League (1906); Eastern Illinois League (1907–1908)

Major league affiliations
- Team: None

Minor league titles
- League titles (0): None

Team data
- Name: Mattoon–Charleston Canaries (1906); Charleston Broom Corn Cutters (1907); Charleston Evangelists (1908)
- Ballpark: Urban Park Field (1906–1908)

Minor league baseball teams were based in Charleston, Illinois from 1906 to 1908, known under a different nickname each season. Charleston teams played as members of the Class D level 1906 Kentucky–Illinois–Tennessee League and the Eastern Illinois League in 1907 and 1908. Charleston hosted minor league home games at Urban Park Field.

== History ==
Minor league baseball began in Charleston, Illinois is 1906. The Mattoon–Charleston Canaries began play in the six–team Kentucky–Illinois–Tennessee League, when Mattoon, Illinois partnered with Charleston to field a team. The team founding was headed by the Mattoon City Railway Company, who ran the local interurban rail line. The Mattoon City Railway Company had built an amusement park located between Mattoon and Charleston where the ballpark was located. Mattoon-Charleston manager John Berryhill was hired as the manager/player and was paid $150 for the season. Fred More of Charleston was the teams' managing owner. Fans created the 'Canaries" moniker, after the broomcorn cutters that flooded the region each fall. Per the league structure, the team salary limit was $1,000 per month and the league fee was $400. The local Journal-Gazette newspaper distributed badge buttons that declared it was the place for “base ball news.” The highest reported attendance at the games was over 1,000 for a game against Cairo in May, 1906.

The 1906 Mattoon–Charleston team was a last place team, placing sixth with a 57–74 record under managers Jack McCarthy and Bob Berryhill. The Canaries finished 23.5 games behind the first place Vincennes Alices in the final standings. The Kentucky–Illinois–Tennessee League folded after the 1906 season.

The Kitty League was unable to reorganize for the 1907 season and the Mattoon City Railway Company relinquished ownership of the team to stock companies as efforts to join the new Eastern Illinois League began. The Mattoon–Charleston Canary's management felt that the joint Mattoon-Charleston the team had not drawn well in 1906 due to the merger of the two towns. It was decided to separate and form two teams. Urban Park field was turned over to a Charleston–only team and the baseball equipment was given to a new stock company in Mattoon, for their Mattoon Ball Club. Mattoon and Charleston then created separate teams for 1907.

With the Kentucky–Illinois–Tennessee League folded, the Charleston Broom Corn Cutters became charter members of the 1907 Eastern Illinois League, which began play as a six–team Class D level league. The Centralia White Stockings, Mattoon Giants, Pana Coal Miners, Shelbyville Queen Citys and Taylorville Tailors joined Charleston in the league.

Charleston finished the 1907 Eastern Illinois League standings in second place after beginning league play on May 12, 1907. The Broom Corn Cutters finished the 1907 season with a 71–49 record to place second in the league standings, playing under manager Nig Langdon. Charleston finished 4.0 games behind their new rival, the first place Mattoon Giants. Charleston's Andy Lotshaw led the league in home runs, with 10 and Bill Bartley led the league in Runs, with 51.

On May 22, 1907, Tug Wilson and Dougal McDonald of Charleston pitched a combined no-hitter in a game against the Taylorville Tailors in a 1–0 loss.

It was reported by the Associated Press that the league teams in Charleston, Mattoon, Pana and Paris were supported, “In great part from saloon interests.”

Charleston continued play in the 1908 Eastern Illinois League as the Charleston Evangelists, but folded during the season. The team's "Evangelists" moniker likely was in reference to an evangelical movement led by former major league player Billy Sunday that promoted a ballot item on April 7, 1908, that sought to abolish alcohol in the region. After the election, six of the Eastern Illinois League's eight franchise cities voted to become dry and the league began to suffer financially. Billy Sunday moved his revival to Charleston in April 1908 and began a new crusade against the league teams playing baseball games on Sunday. In what was the final season of play for Charleston, the team folded on June 30, 1908, along with the Mattoon Giants. Art Ahring of Charleston was leading the league with a batting average of .355. The Evangelists had a 37–37 record under managers Herman Walters, Walter Madden and James Kerwin when the franchise permanently folded. The loss of Charleston and Mattoon left the league with six remaining teams. After the 1908 season, the Eastern Illinois League permanently folded.

Charleston, Illinois has not hosted another minor league team.

== The ballpark ==
In 1906, the Mattoon-Charleston Canaries were noted to have begun minor league play at the Urban Park field, which was located within the amusement park built by the Mattoon City Railway Company. The park was located between the two cities along the trolley line that connected Mattoon and Charleston. After the Mattoon team began play in 1907, Charleston took over use of the ballpark. Today, the Charleston Country Club occupies the site. The location of the Charleston Country Club is 8355 Country Club Road, Charleston, Illinois.

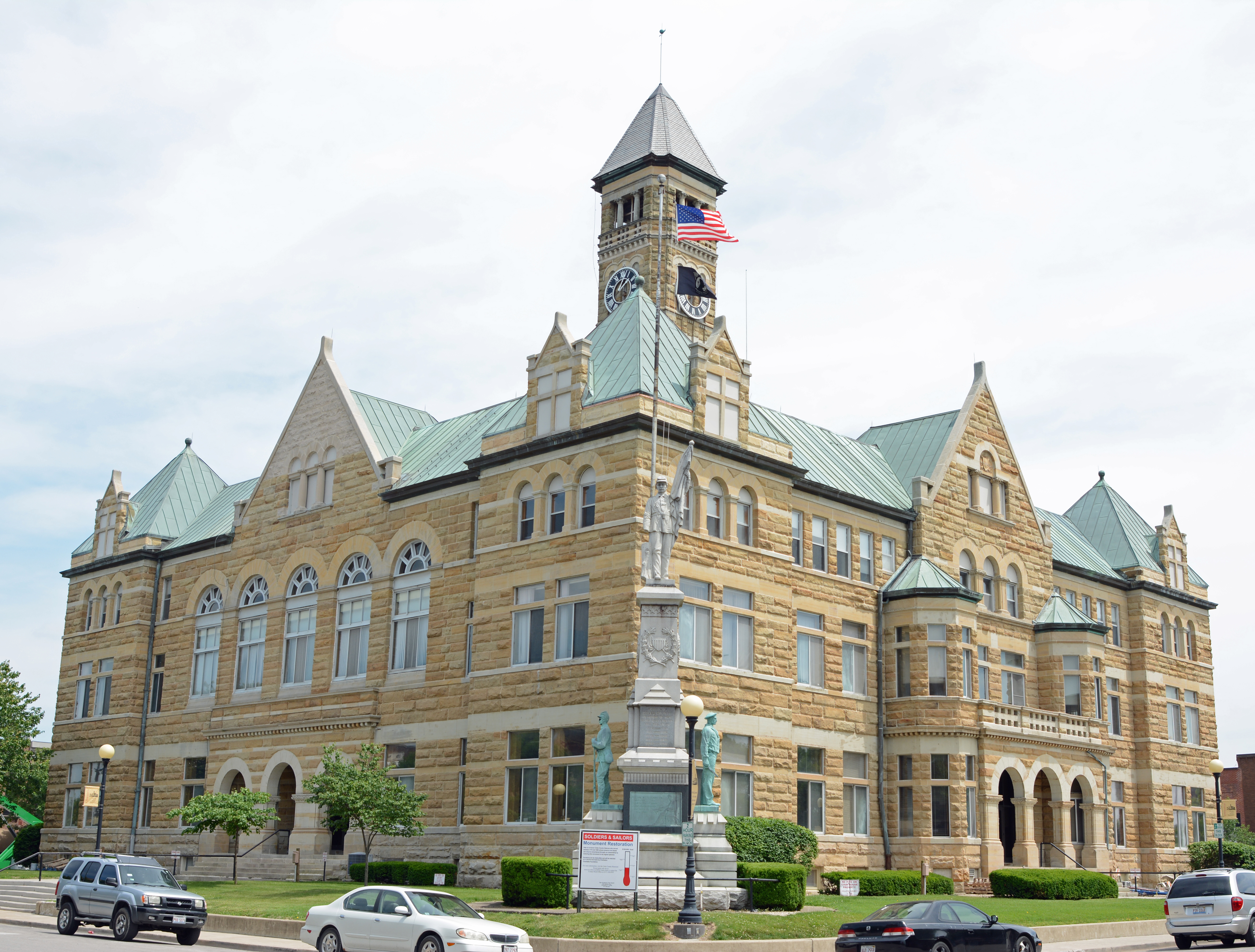
(2015) Coles County courthouse. National Register of Historic Places. Charleston, Illinois

== Timeline ==
Year(s)	# Yrs.	Team	Level	League	Ballpark
1906	1	Mattoon-Charleston Canaries	Class D	Kentucky–Illinois–Tennessee League	Urban Park Field
1907	1	Charleston Broom Corn Cutters	Class D	Eastern Illinois League	Urban Park Field
1908	1	Charleston Evangelists	Class D	Eastern Illinois League	Urban Park Field

== Year–by–year records ==
Year	Record	Finish	Manager	Playoffs / notes
1906	57–74	6th	Jack McCarthy / Bob Berryhill	No playoffs held
1907	71–49	2nd	Nig Langdon	No playoffs held
1908	37–37	NA	Herman Walters / Walter Madden / James Kerwin	Team folded June 30

== Notable alumni ==
- Red Corriden (1907)
- Larry Doyle (1906)
- Rowdy Elliott (1907)
- Bob Higgins (1907)
- Jack McCarthy (1906, MGR)
- Milo Netzel (1907–1908)
- Larry Pratt (1907)

== See also ==
- Charleston Broom Corn Cutters players
- Mattoon-Charleston Canaries players
- Charleston Evangelists players
