= Brown Stockings =

Brown Stockings may refer to various former baseball teams:

- St. Louis Brown Stockings, now St. Louis Cardinals
- Davenport Brown Stockings, now Quad Cities River Bandits
- Worcester Brown Stockings, a.k.a. Worcester Worcesters
