= Crawfordsville Hoosiers =

- 1888; Crawfordsville, Indiana

Minor league affiliations
- Class: Independent (1888)
- League: Central Interstate League (1888)

Major league affiliations
- Team: None

Minor league titles
- League titles (0): None

Team data
- Name: Crawfordsville Hoosiers (1888)
- Ballpark: Unknown (1888)

The Crawfordsville Hoosiers were a minor league baseball team briefly based in Crawfordsville, Indiana, United States, in 1888. The Crawfordsville Hoosiers were charter members of the Independent level Central Interstate League, before relocating to Terre Haute, Indiana during the 1888 season. Baseball Hall of Fame member Bud Fowler played for the Hoosiers.

== History ==
Crawfordsville, Indiana first hosted minor league baseball play in 1888, when the Crawfordsville "Hoosiers" became charter members of the Independent level Central Interstate League. The Bloomington Reds, Danville Browns, Davenport Hawkeyes, Decatur, Dubuque, Lafayette, Peoria Reds and Rockford Rox joined the Crawfordsville Hoosiers as charter members in league play.

On May 1, 1888, the Crawfordsville Hoosiers began league play, with Baseball Hall of Fame member Bud Fowler on the roster, integrating the team. Fowler had previously been signed by the 1888 Lafayette team, but never appeared for the team after issues with his race arose from the team manager and Fowler asked to be released. Fowler then signed with Crawfordsville. Fowler was described in a local newspaper review of the players on the roster as "having graduated from Oberlin College with honors. He is well informed, has traveled extensively and is an absolute teatotaller." Fowler hit .294 for the 1888 season with the Hoosiers.

On July 2, 1888, the Crawfordsville Hoosiers had a 21–21 record, playing under manager Albert Miller, when the franchise relocated to become the Terre Haute Hoosiers. The team ended the season in third place with a 32–26 overall record, finishing 8.0 games behind the first place Davenport Hawkeyes when the league folded for the season on July 27, 1888. Crawfordsville/Terre Haute player A.W. Snyder led the Central Interstate League with 6 home runs.

Crawfordsville, Indiana has not hosted another minor league team.

== The ballpark ==
The name of the Crawfordsville minor league ballpark in 1888 is unknown.

== Year–by–year record ==
Year	Record	Finish	Manager	Notes
1888	32–26	3rd	Albert Miller / J.W. Carroll	Crawfordsville (21–21) moved to Terre Haute July 2 League folded July 27

== Notable alumni ==
- Bud Fowler (1888) Inducted Baseball Hall of Fame, 2022
- Belden Hill (1888)

== See also ==
Crawfordsville Hoosiers players
