= Jerry Harrington =

American baseball player (1868–1913)

- Catcher
- Born: August 12, 1868; Hamden, Ohio, U.S.
- Died: April 16, 1913 (aged 44); Keokuk, Iowa, U.S.
- Batted: Right Threw: Right

MLB debut
- April 30, 1890, for the Cincinnati Reds

Last MLB appearance
- June 19, 1893, for the Louisville Colonels

MLB statistics
- Batting average: .227
- Home runs: 3
- Runs batted in: 73
- Stats at Baseball Reference

Teams
- Cincinnati Reds (1890–1892); Louisville Colonels (1893)

Jeremiah Peter Harrington (August 12, 1868 – April 16, 1913) was an American professional baseball player whose career spanned six seasons, including four seasons in Major League Baseball (MLB). Harrington played the majority of his games in the majors at catcher; however, he did play first base and third base on occasion. In 189 major league games between the Cincinnati Reds and the Louisville Colonels, Harrington batted .227 with 60 runs, 151 hits, 19 doubles, six triples, three home runs, 73 runs batted in (RBIs), and eight stolen bases.

== Early life ==
Harrington was born in Hamden, Ohio, on August 12, 1868. His father was the manager of the Keokuk, Iowa, baseball club in 1885. At the age of 16, Jerry Harrington began to play semi-professional baseball with the Bonaparte, Iowa, team. Two years later, Harrington began to play with the Creston, Iowa, ball club of the Iowa League.

== Professional career ==
In 1888, Harrington began his professional career in the Central Interstate League. That season, he played for the Danville Browns, the Davenport club, and the Decatur club. Harrington continued to play in the Central Interstate League in 1889 with the Davenport Hawkeyes/Monmouth Browns. Harrington made his major league debut on April 30, 1890, with the Cincinnati Reds. In his first season, he batted .246 with 25 runs, 58 hits, seven doubles, one triple, one home run, 23 RBIs, and four stolen bases in 65 games. Lee Allen, author of The Cincinnati Reds, wrote that Harrington and fellow player Billy Rhines were two top prospects when they joined the Reds, although nearly unknown today. It was also said that Harrington could throw out a baserunner from his knees. In 1891, Harrington's second season with the Reds, he batted .228 with 25 runs, 76 hits, 10 doubles, five triples, two home runs, 41 RBIs, and four stolen bases in 92 games. In David L. Porter's Biographical Dictionary of American Sports: Q–Z, it was noted that Rhines, Harrington and fellow Reds teammate Pete Browning received fines and suspensions because of misbehavior outside of baseball. Harrington played his final season with the Reds in 1892. In 22 games, Harrington batted .213 with six runs, 13 hits, one double, and three RBIs. In 1893, Harrington joined the Louisville Colonels, which would prove to be his final season in professional baseball. With the Colonels, Harrington batted .111 with four runs, four hits, one double, and three RBIs in 10 games.

== Later life ==
After his professional baseball career was over, Harrington resided in Keokuk, Iowa. There, Harrington became the assistant chief of police. On April 16, 1913, at the age of 44, Harrington was struck in the head with a beer can and killed by Tom Merritt, described in Lee Allen's book The Cincinnati Reds as a "thug." He was buried at Oakland Cemetery in Keokuk, Iowa.
