= William Popp =

William Popp may refer to:

- William Popp (footballer), Japanese football goalkeeper
- William W. Popp, American diplomat
- Bill Popp, Major League Baseball pitcher

== See also ==
- Willian Popp, Brazilian football striker
