= Joe Adams (baseball) =

American baseball player (1877–1952)

- Pitcher
- Born: October 28, 1877; Cowden, Illinois, U.S.
- Died: October 8, 1952 (aged 74); Montgomery City, Missouri, U.S.
- Batted: Right Threw: Left

MLB debut
- April 26, 1902, for the St. Louis Cardinals

Last MLB appearance
- April 26, 1902, for the St. Louis Cardinals

MLB statistics
- Win–loss record: 0–0
- Earned run average: 9.00
- Strikeouts: 0
- Stats at Baseball Reference

Teams
- St. Louis Cardinals (1902)

Joe Edward "Old Wagon Tongue" Adams (October 28, 1877 – October 8, 1952) was an American Major League Baseball player and minor league manager. He was also known as "Old Wagon Tongue."

A 6'0" pitcher from Cowden, Illinois, Adams appeared in one game for the St. Louis Cardinals on April 26, 1902, at the age of 24. He pitched four innings and allowed nine hits. He also walked two players, hit another, and gave up six runs (four earned), resulting in a career ERA of 9.00. Adams also had two at-bats, but did not reach base either time.

Adams also played semi-pro baseball in both Illinois and Iowa. He later served as a minor league manager, and in 1911 managed future Hall of Famer Ray Schalk in his first professional season with the Taylorville Christians. Adams had previously managed the Pana Coal Miners in 1907 and the Shelbyville Queen Citys in 1908, both in the Eastern Illinois League. According to the 1908 Spalding Guide, Adams was the "godfather" of the Eastern Illinois League, which began in 1907 in Pana.

Besides Shalk, other baseball figures Adams was associated with included Hall of Famer Frank Chance and minor leaguers Bert King and Dick Kinsella. By 1932 Adams owned a restaurant in Jackson, Missouri. Adams died in Montgomery City, Missouri at the age of 74 and is currently buried at Myers Cemetery in Herrick, Illinois.

Adams' nickname of "Wagon Tongue" has been regarded by multiple baseball writers as one of baseball's all-time great nicknames.
