= Hampton W. Wall =

American politician

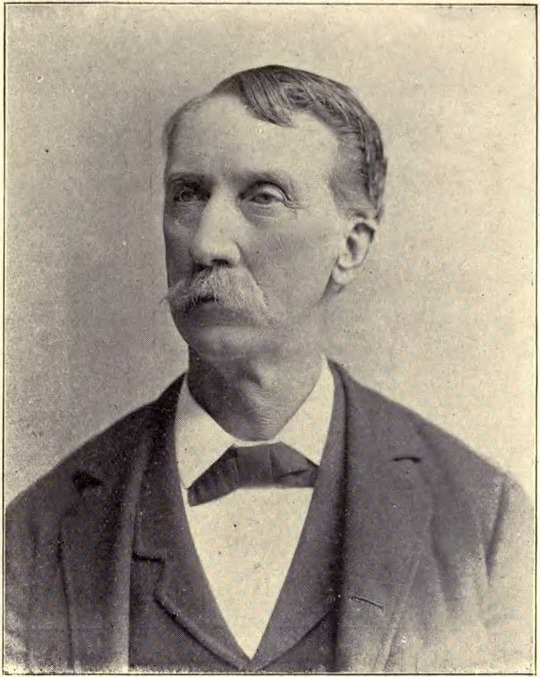
- Born: November 10, 1831; Macoupin County
- Died: April 16, 1898 (aged 66); Staunton
- Occupation: Politician
- Political party: Democratic Party
- Position held: member of the State Senate of Illinois, member of the Illinois House of Representatives

Hampton W. Wall (November 10, 1831 – April 16, 1898) was an American politician and businessman.

== Biography ==
Wall was born on a farm near Staunton, Illinois. He went to the public schools. Wall was a banker and lived in Staunton, Illinois with his wife and family. He served on the Macoupin County Board of Supervisors and as a justice of the peace. Wall served in the Illinois House of Representatives from 1877 to 1881. Wall then served in the Illinois Senate from 1893 to 1897 and was a Democrat. Wall was murdered by a tenant in Staunton, Illinois with a firearm.
