= Lou Rochelli =

American baseball player (1919-1992)

- Second baseman
- Born: January 11, 1919; Staunton, Illinois, U.S.
- Died: October 23, 1992 (aged 73); Victoria, Texas, U.S.
- Batted: Right Threw: Right

MLB debut
- August 25, 1944, for the Brooklyn Dodgers

Last MLB appearance
- August 29, 1944, for the Brooklyn Dodgers

MLB statistics
- Batting average: .176
- Home runs: 0
- Runs scored: 0
- Stats at Baseball Reference

Teams
- Brooklyn Dodgers (1944)

Louis Joseph Rochelli (January 11, 1919 – October 23, 1992) was an American Major League Baseball second baseman who appeared in five games for the Brooklyn Dodgers in 1944. The 25-year-old rookie was a native of Staunton, Illinois.

Rochelli is one of many ballplayers who only appeared in the major leagues during World War II. He played in five consecutive games (August 25-August 29) for the Dodgers, four against the New York Giants at the Polo Grounds and one against the Philadelphia Blue Jays at Ebbets Field. He went 3-for-17 (.176) with 2 walks, a triple, and 2 runs batted in. He handled 27 of 28 chances successfully for a .964 fielding percentage.

Rochelli managed the Dodgers farm system from 1947 to 1958, primarily with the Great Falls Electrics of the Pioneer League.

He died at the age of 73 in Victoria, Texas.
