= Heinie Jantzen =

American baseball player (1890–1948)

- Outfielder
- Born: April 9, 1890; Chicago, Illinois, U.S.
- Died: April 1, 1948 (aged 57); Hines, Illinois, U.S.
- Batted: Right Threw: Right

MLB debut
- June 29, 1912, for the St. Louis Browns

Last MLB appearance
- September 13, 1912, for the St. Louis Browns

MLB statistics
- Batting average: .185
- Home runs: 1
- Runs batted in: 8
- Stats at Baseball Reference

Teams
- St. Louis Browns (1912)

Walter Charles "Heinie" Jantzen (April 9, 1890 – April 1, 1948) was an American baseball player.

Jantzen was born in Chicago in 1890.

He began playing professional baseball in 1910 with the Vincennes Alices in the Kentucky–Illinois–Tennessee League. In 1911, he continued in the minor leagues, playing for Vincennes as well as the Cairo Egyptians.

In 1912, he reached the major leagues, playing for the St. Louis Browns. He appeared in 31 games for the Browns between June 29 and September 13. He was a right fielder and compiled a batting average of .185 with 22 hits, 10 runs, one home run, and one RBI. In his 31 games in right field, he was never charged with an error and finished his career with a perfect 1.000 fielding percentage.

In mid-September 1912, the Browns sent Jantzen to the Montgomery Rebels of the Southern Association. He played for Montgomery during the 1913 and 1914 seasons. Jantzen continued playing professional baseball until 1921, including stints with the Little Rock Travelers of the Southern Association (1915–1916), Chattanooga Lookouts (1916), and Bloomington Bloomers of the Illinois–Indiana–Iowa League (1919–1921).

Jantzen died at age 57 in Hines, Illinois.
