= Davenport Hawkeyes =

- 1888–1889; (1879, 1888–1889, 1891); Davenport, Iowa

Minor league affiliations
- Class: Independent (1879, 1888–1889, 1891); Class A (1888)
- League: Northwestern League (1879); Western Association (1888); Central Interstate League (1888–1889); Illinois-Iowa League (1891)

Major league affiliations
- Team: None

Minor league titles
- League titles (1): 1888

Team data
- Name: Davenport Brown Stockings (1879); Davenport Onion Weeders (1888); Davenport Hawkeyes (1888–1889); Davenport Pilgrims (1891)
- Ballpark: Unknown

The Davenport Hawkeyes were a minor league baseball team based in Davenport, Iowa. In 1888 and 1889, the Hawkeyes were charter members of the independent level Central Interstate League, winning the league's first championship in 1888.

The Hawkeyes were preceded by the first minor league team in Davenport, the 1879 Davenport "Brown Stockings" of the Northwestern League. The Hawkeyes were succeeded by the 1891 Davenport "Pilgrims" of the 1891 Illinois-Iowa League. In 1888, Davenport briefly hosted a second team of the season, the Davenport "Onion Weeders" who finished the season as a member of the Class A level Western Association after the Minneapolis Millers team relocated to Davenport.

In the 1879 season, Baseball Hall of Fame member Bid McPhee played for the Davenport Brown Stockings at age 19.

== History ==
=== 1879 Northwestern League ===
In 1879, the Davenport "Brown Stockings" became the first minor league baseball team based in Davenport, Iowa, when the Brown Stockings became charter members of the four-team independent Northwestern League. The Dubuque Red Stockings, Omaha Green Stockings and Rockford White Stockings teams joined Davenport in league play. The league is acknowledged to be the first minor league with franchises west of the Mississippi River.

The Brown Stockings ended short the Northwestern League season in fourth place. The league season began on May 1, 1879, and ended on July 7, 1879. Davenport ended the season with a record of 5–15, finishing 12.0 games behind the first place Dubuque Red Stockings, as J. W. Green served as manager. The Northwestern League did not return to play in 1880 and reformed in 1883 without a Davenport based franchise.

Baseball Hall of Fame member Bid McPhee played for the 1879 Davenport Brown Stockings at age 19, after having played for the semi-professional Davenport team in 1878. McPhee hit .229 in action limited to 20 games in 1879. In 1880, discouraged by his baseball career, the New York native McPhee remained in the city and secured a job as a bookkeeper in Davenport instead of playing minor league baseball. He then resumed playing baseball in 1881, playing in Akron, Ohio.

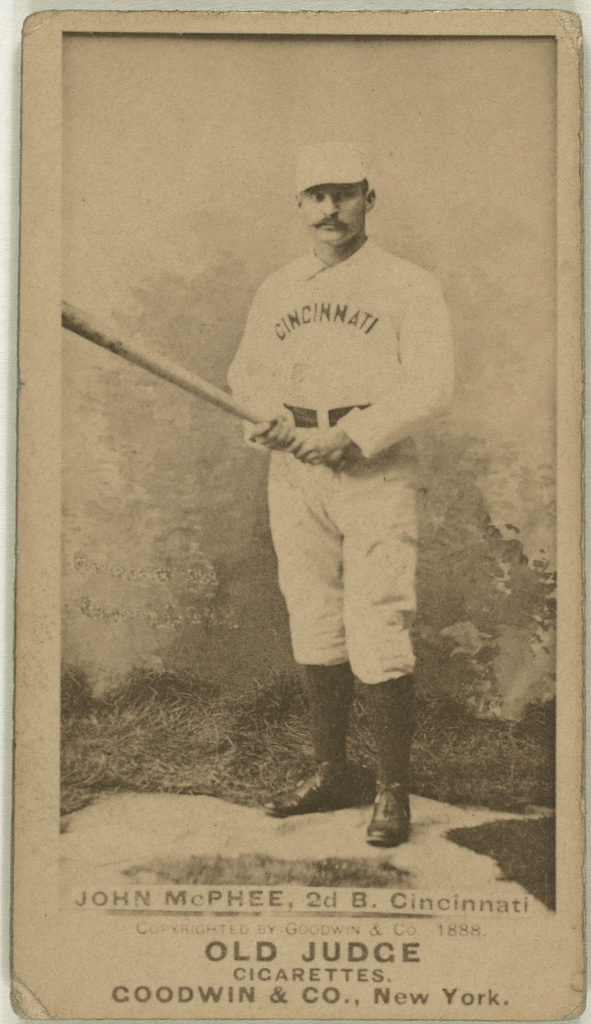
(1888) Bid McPhee, Cincinnati Red Stockings, baseball card. McPhee played for the 1879 Davenport Brown Stockings. McPhee was inducted into the Baseball Hall of Fame

=== Two leagues 1888 & 1889 ===
Davenport resumed minor league baseball play in 1888, when the city hosted two teams during the season and won a championship. To begin the 1888 season, the Davenport "Hawkeyes" franchise became charter members of the eight-team independent level Central Interstate League. The Bloomington Reds, Crawfordsville Hoosiers, Danville Browns, Decatur, Dubuque, Peoria Reds and Rockford Rox teams joined Davenport as charter members in league play, which began on May 1, 1888.

The Davenport "Hawkeyes" team nickname corresponds with the state of Iowa being nicknamed "The Hawkeye State," with the state nickname dating to 1838. The University of Iowa also began using the Hawkeye nickname in the era.

On July 27, 1888, the Davenport Hawkeyes were in first place with a 40–18 record, when the Central Interstate League folded. Playing under manager William Lucas, Davenport finished 3.5 games ahead of the second place Peoria Reds in the final standings of the shortened season. Owen Williams of Davenport led the league with 65 runs scored, while teammate Willard Mains led the Central Interstate League with a 16–4 record.

After the folding of the Central Interstate League on July 27, the vacancy in Davenport gained the city a second team during the 1888 season. On August 18, 1888, the Minneapolis Millers of the Class A level Western Association played their final game before the franchise was sold and relocated to Davenport. The Millers had compiled a 28-52 record while based in Minneapolis. The newly formed Davenport "Onion Weeders" began play in the league on August 25, 1888. Davenport joined the Chicago Maroons, Des Moines Prohibitionists, Kansas City Blues, Milwaukee Brewers, Omaha Omahogs, St. Louis Whites, St. Paul Apostles and Sioux City Cornhuskers teams in league play.

William Lucas remained with the franchise to manage his second Davenport team of the season, as the Davenport Onion Weeders began play in the Western Association. Playing the remainder of the league schedule based in Davenport, the Onion Weeders compiled a 4–21 record while based in Davenport. When the 1888 season ended, the Minneapolis/Davenport team had a combined 32–74 record and placed last in the eight-team Western Association.

Despite folding during the season of the previous year, the Central Interstate League reformed in 1889, with the Davenport Hawkeyes returning to the league. Managed by Bob Allen, Charles Holcaher and Charles Hall, the Hawkeyes folded from six-team league during the season. On September 10, 1889, the Hawkeyes had a 57–45 record when the team folded. Philip Routcliffe of Davenport led the league with 122 runs scored and the Quincy Ravens were the eventual league champions with a 66–50 record. The 1890 Central Interstate League continued play without a Davenport franchise.

The 1889 Hawkeyes team folded after the Davenport team quit the league rather than play road series at Quincy and Springfield. Davenport complained that umpiring was unfair in the Illinois cities. The Central Interstate League played its final season in 1890 without a Davenport franchise.

=== 1891 Illinois-Iowa League ===
In 1891, the Davenport "Pilgrims" became members of the eight-team Illinois-Iowa League in the second season of the league, before disbanding during the season.

George Nicol compiled a 15–8 record with a 1.36 ERA in 23 games, with five shutouts. On Sunday July 19, 1891, Nicol pitched his final game for Davenport in front of a home crowd of 2,000. After the game, Nicol joined the Chicago Colts, and manager Cap Anson, who offered him a $225 a month contract and bought his contract from Davenport for $300.

On July 22, 1891, shortly after Nicol's departure, the Pilgrims folded. Davenport ended their season with a record of 23–38, playing their partial Illinois-Iowa League season under managers Kerken and John Crogan. Davenport did not return as a member of the 1892 Illinois-Iowa League.

Davenport next hosted minor league baseball in 1901, when the Davenport River Rats became charter members of the Illinois-Indiana-Iowa League. Today, Davenport continues hosting minor league play as home to the Quad Cities River Bandits of the Class A level Midwest League.

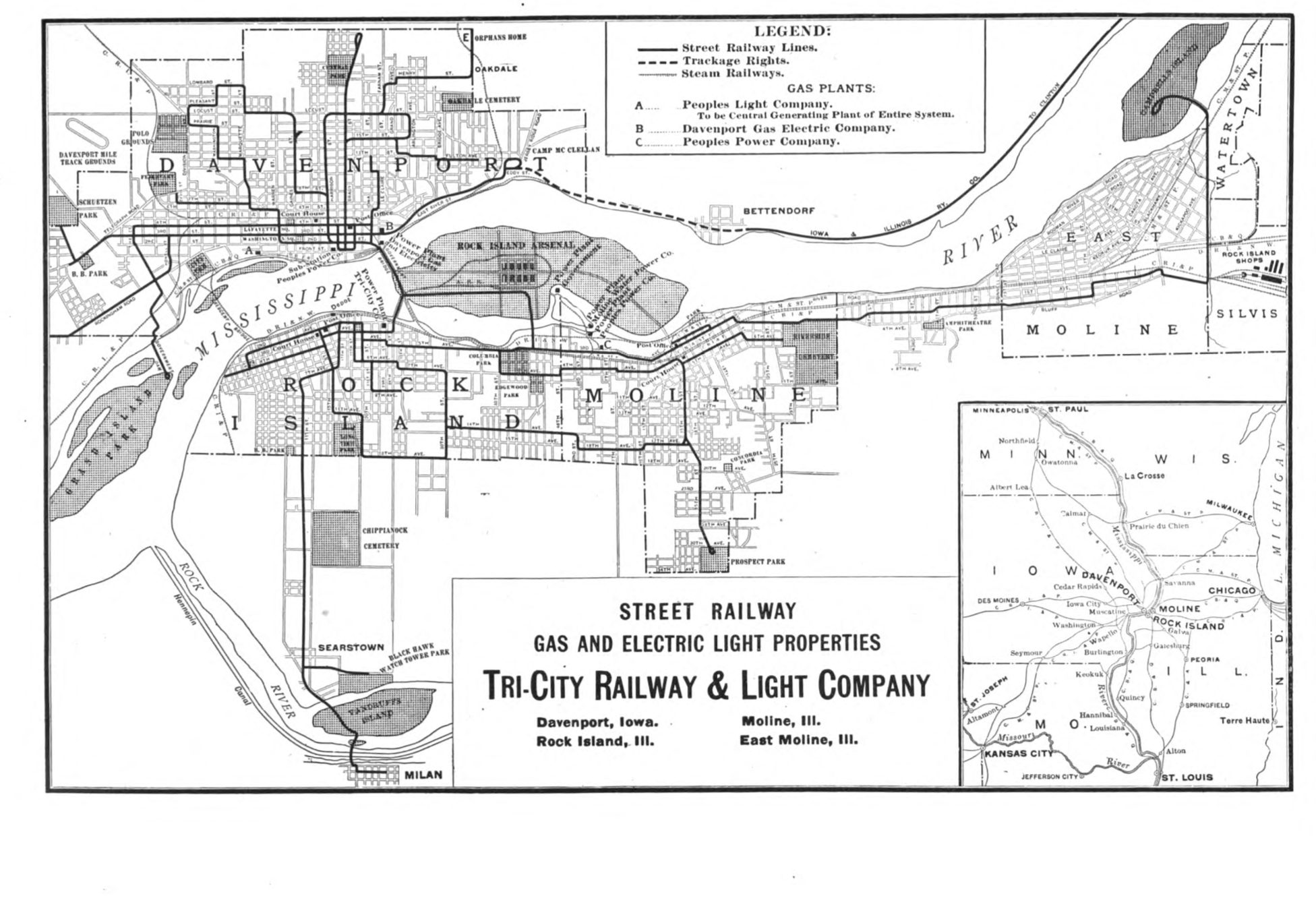
(1907) Map of Tri-City Railway and Light Company, Davenport, Iowa; Rock Island, Illinois; Moline, Illinois and East Moline, Illinois. "Schuetzen Park" and "B.B. Park" are both labeled in the upper left of the map.

== The ballpark(s) ==
The name of the Davenport home minor league ballpark from the 1879 to 1891 seasons is unknown. Early Davenport minor league teams were noted to have played at a ballpark located on the West side of Davenport. Located in West Davenport, Schuetzen Park was in use in the era, having opened in 1870 as a private park with athletic facilities and streetcar access. The pre 1900's Davenport minor league teams were noted to have hosted Sunday games on "Sullivan Island," which is likely Sylvan Island.

== Timeline ==
Year(s)	# Yrs.	Team	Level	League
1879	1	Davenport Brown Stockings	Independent	Northwestern League
1888	1	Davenport Onion Weeders	Class A	Western Association
1888–1889	2	Davenport Hawkeyes	Independent	Central Interstate League
1891	1	Davenport Pilgrims	Independent	Illinois-Iowa League

== Year–by–year records ==
Year	Record	Finish	Manager	Playoffs/notes
1879	5–15	4th	J.W. Green	No playoffs held
1888 (1)	40–18	1st	William Lucas	League folded July 27; League champions
1888 (2)	32–74	8th	William Lucas	Minneapolis (28–52) moved to Davenport August 25; 4–21 record based in Davenport
1889	57–45	NA	Bob Allen / Charles Holcaher; Charles Hall	Team folded September 10
1891	23–38	NA	Kerken / John Crogan	Team folded July 22

== Notable alumni ==
- Bid McPhee (1879) Inducted Baseball Hall of Fame, 2000
- Bob Allen (1889, MGR)
- Charlie Briggs (1888)
- Joe Blong (1879)
- Charlie Bohn (1879)
- Art Croft (1879)
- Pat Deasley (1889)
- Jack Fanning (1889)
- Tom Forster (1888)
- Eddie Fusselback (1889)
- Charlie Gessner (1889)
- Sam Gillen (1891)
- Jerry Harrington (1888-1899)
- James Harris (1891)
- Belden Hill (1891)
- Charlie Hoover (1888)
- Harry Jacoby (1888)
- Heinie Kappel (1889)
- Joe Kappel (1889)
- Rudy Kemmler (1879, 1888)
- Mike Jordan (1891)
- Jerry Kane (1891)
- Andy Knox (1891)
- Chuck Lauer (1889)
- Willard Mains (1888)
- Charlie Mason (1879)
- Ed Mayer (1888)
- Harry McCaffery (1879)
- Al McCauley (1888)
- Trick McSorley (1888)
- Kid Mohler (1891)
- Gene Moriarty (1889)
- Mike Moynahan (1879)
- Connie Murphy (1889)
- George Nicol (1891)
- Sam Nicholl (1889)
- Robert Pender (1889)
- Charlie Reising (1888)
- Billy Rhines (1889)
- Phil Routcliffe (1889)
- Harry Sage (1891)
- Crazy Schmit (1891)
- Ben Stephens (1888)
- Len Stockwell (1879)
- George Treadway (1888)
- Pat Whitaker (1889)
- Guerdon Whiteley (1888)
- Henry Yaik (1889)

== See also ==
- Davenport Brown Stockings players
- Davenport minor league players
- Davenport Hawkeyes players
- Davenport Onion Weeders players
- Davenport Pilgrims players

== See also ==
List of Professional baseball teams based in Davenport, Iowa
