= John B. Foster (baseball) =

American baseball writer, ballclub officer, and sports editor

John Buckingham Foster
- Born: July 16, 1863; New York City, New York, U.S.
- Died: September 29, 1941 (aged 78); New York City, New York, U.S.
- Occupations: Baseball writer, sports editor, ballclub officer
- Writing career
- Notable work: Spalding's Official Base Ball Guide

John Buckingham Foster (July 16, 1863 – September 29, 1941) was an American baseball writer, ballclub officer and sports editor.

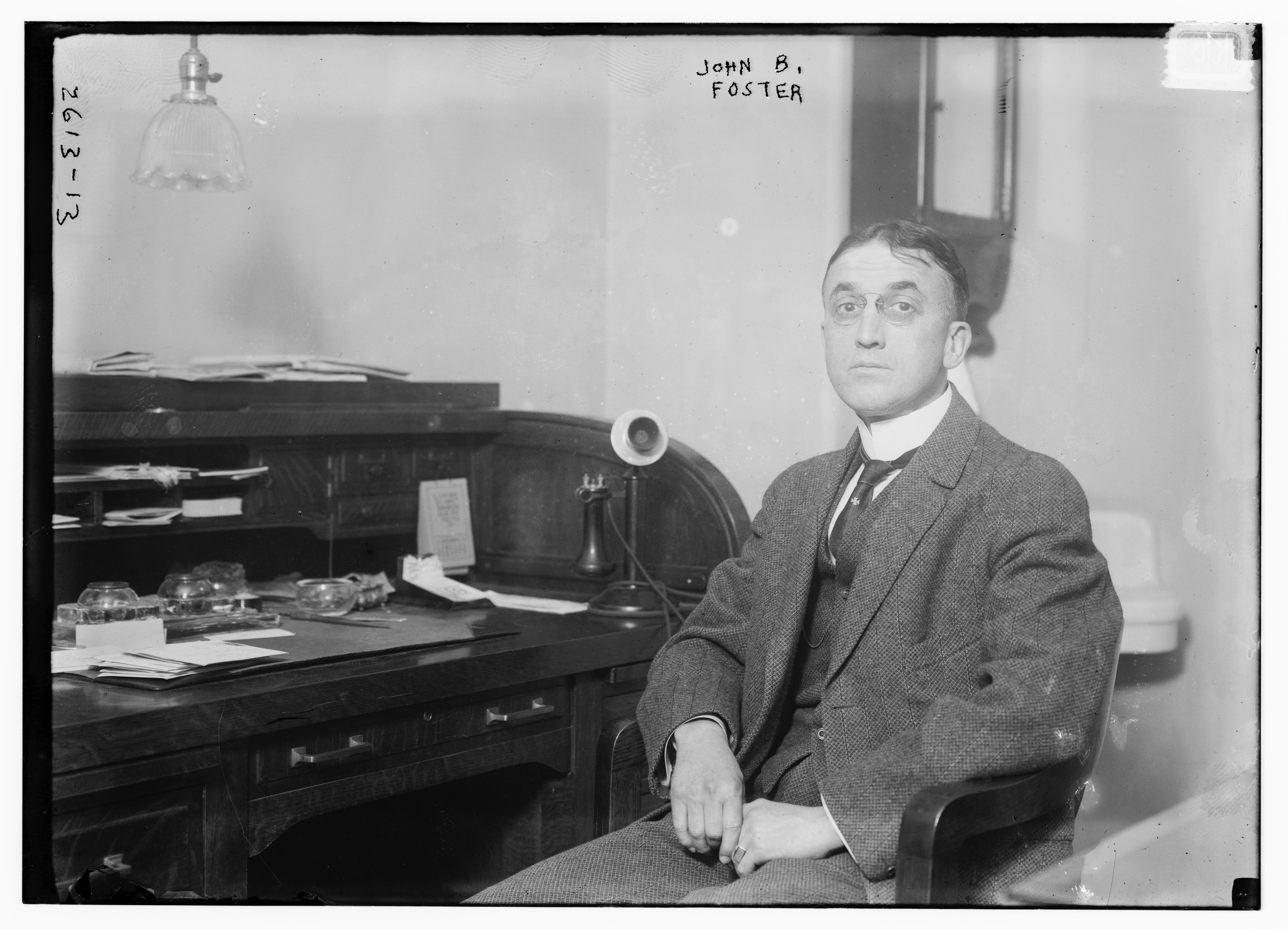

Born in New York City, New York, Foster started his career as sportswriter for the New York World-Telegram. He then joined the New York Giants in 1913, where he worked as secretary of the National League club for the next seven years.

Afterwards, Foster joined the Spalding Company, where he worked as writer and editor of the Spalding's Official Base Ball Guide from the Spalding Athletic Library collection, which offered official Major League Baseball statistics and recaps, along with abbreviated narrative and standings for the minor leagues. The Spalding Company bought out the Reach Baseball Company in 1934, but the two guides continued to be published separately until 1939. Both companies eventually merged into the Spalding-Reach Guide for two more years, before being replaced by The Sporting News Baseball Guide after the 1941 publication.

Foster died in 1941 in New York City at the age of 78.
