= Kitchell Park =

- U.S. National Register of Historic Places
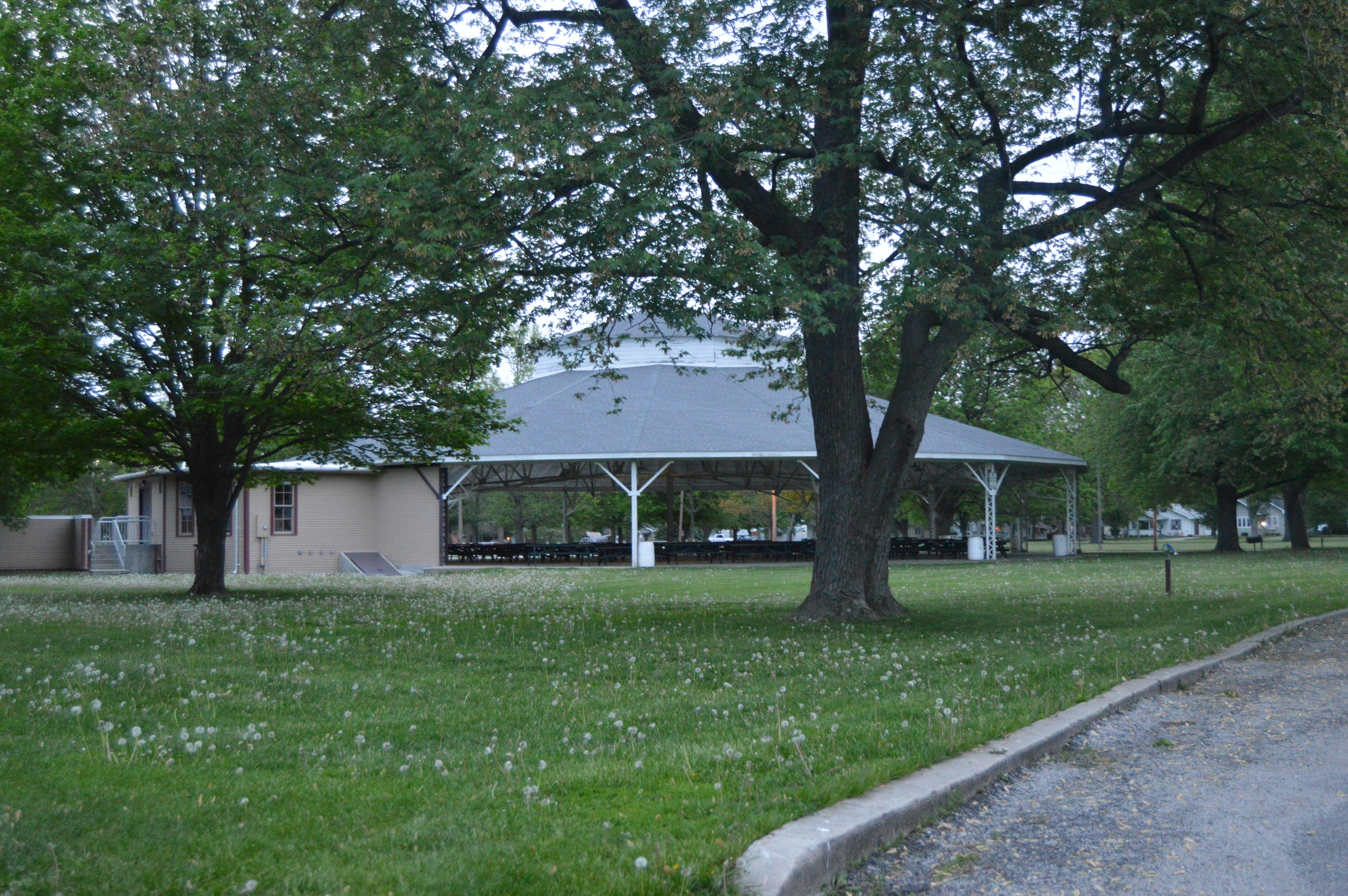
- The Chautauqua pavilion

- Location within Illinois Location within the United States
- Location: Jct. of Ninth and Kitchell Sts., Pana, Illinois
- Coordinates: 39°22′47″N 89°4′45″W
- Area: 40 acres (16 ha)
- Built: 1908
- NRHP reference No.: 92001538
- Added to NRHP: November 5, 1992

Kitchell Park is a park which is listed on the United States National Register of Historic Places. The park is in the city of Pana, Illinois, located in Christian County. A 40-acre (160,000 m^{2}) facility, Kitchell is one of the city's main parks. It was added to the National Register of Historic Places in 1992.

== History ==
Kitchell Park was given to the city of Pana by John W. Kitchell and his wife Mary Little Kitchell in 1908. It is home to several unique and old features. The round Chautauqua Pavilion was built in 1911 and has attracted such speakers as William Jennings Bryan, World War I hero Sergeant York and Billy Sunday among others. The Schuyler Bridge was constructed entirely of concrete in 1910. The park's ornate main gate acted as the entrance booth for the Tri-County Fair which was held on park grounds from 1885 until it moved to its present fairgrounds in 1949. Part of the park's original horse track is still one of the main roads through the park. The story is that Frank James of the Missouri Gang was starter and timekeeper at the track in his later years, after he was pardoned by authorities.

Today the park is home to tennis courts, a disc golf course, softball and baseball diamonds, a swimming pool, playgrounds and a picnic area. The park's auditorium is the result of a deluge, 6.5 inches of rain, that fell on the area in 1910. It was felt that if the pavilion were to survive adequate shelter would need to be provided. At the time of its construction the auditorium was called one of the most modern in the nation with its seating capacity of 3,500 and 35 X 45-foot (14 m) stage. The auditorium was renovated in 1955 through funding from the Pana Lions Club. New paint, a concrete floor and rewiring for the installation of 24 overhead lights were all included in the project.
