= Central Interstate League =

- Classification: Independent (1888–1890)
- Sport: Minor League Baseball
- First season: 1888
- Folded: 1890
- Replaced by: Northern League
- President: William H. Allen (1888); Henderson Ridgely (1889); E.T. McNeally (1890); Fitzpatrick (1890)
- No. of teams: 8
- Country: United States of America
- Most titles: 1 Davenport Hawkeyes (1888); Quincy Ravens (1889); Evansville Hoosiers (1890)

The Central Interstate League was an independent minor league baseball league that operated from 1888 to 1890.

William H. Allen (1888), Henderson Ridgely (1889), E.T. McNeally (1890) and Fitzpatrick (1890) served as the league presidents.

The 1888 Davenport Hawkeyes, 1889 Quincy Ravens and 1890 Evansville Hoosiers won league championships. The league permanently folded following the 1890 season.

== Cities represented ==
- Bloomington, IL: Bloomington Reds 1888
- Burlington, IA: Burlington Babies 1889; Burlington Hawkeyes 1890
- Crawfordsville, IN: Crawfordsville Hoosiers 1888
- Danville, IL: Danville Browns 1888
- Davenport, IA: Davenport Hawkeyes 1888–1889
- Decatur, IL: Decatur 1888
- Dubuque, IA: Dubuque 1888
- Evansville, IN: Evansville Hoosiers 1889–1890
- Galesburg, IL: Galesburg Pavers 1890
- Indianapolis, IN: Indianapolis 1890
- Lafayette, IN: Lafayette 1888
- Peoria, IL: Peoria Reds 1888; Peoria Canaries 1889–1890
- Quincy, IL: Quincy Ravens 1889–1890
- Rockford, IL: Rockford Rox 1888
- Springfield, IL: Springfield Senators 1889
- Terre Haute, IN: Terre Haute Hoosiers 1888, 1890

== Standings & statistics ==
=== 1888 Central Interstate League ===
Team standings	W	L	PCT	GB	Managers
Davenport Hawkeyes	40	18	.690	–	William Henry Lucas
Peoria Reds	38	22	.633	3	Charles Flynn
Crawfordsville Hoosiers / Terre Haute Hoosiers	32	26	.552	8	Albert Miller / J.W. Carroll
Bloomington Reds	26	28	.481	12	Edward Wochner / Cheney; Joseph Farrell
Dubuque	21	18	.538	NA	C.R. McQuade
Decatur / Lafayette	7	30	.189	NA	Michael Hurley / Lawrence McKeon / William McMillen
Danville Browns	15	25	.375	NA	W.C. Johnson
Rockford Rox	11	23	.324	NA	William Allen

Decatur (6–23) transferred to Lafayette June 13.; Rockford disbanded June 26.; Crawfordsville (21–21) transferred to Terre Haute July 2; Danville disbanded Jul 5; Lafayette and Dubuque disbanded July 9.
The league disbanded July 27.

Player statistics
Player	Team	Stat	Tot	Player	Team	Stat	Tot
William Schwartz	Peoria	BA	.389	Matt Keogan	Peoria	W	17
Owen Williams	Davenport	Runs	65	Willard Mains	Davenport	PCT	.800 16–4
William Schwartz	Peoria	Hits	82				
A.W. Snyder	Crawfordsville/Terre Haute	HR	6				

=== 1889 Central Interstate League ===
Team standings	W	L	PCT	GB	Managers
Quincy Ravens	66	50	.569	–	George Brackett
Springfield Senators	65	53	.551	2	Harry Smith / Henderson Ridgely
Burlington Babies	55	62	.470	11½	William Henry Lucas
Peoria Canaries	55	64	.462	12½	Charles Flynn / Charlie Bartson; Charlie Levis
Evansville Hoosiers	51	69	.425	17	Walt Goldsby / Jacob Aydelotte; Doug Crothers
Davenport Hawkeyes	57	45	.559	NA	Charles Holacher / Bob Allen

Davenport disbanded September 10.

Player statistics
Player	Team	Stat	Tot
Allen McCauley	Peoria	BA	.317
Philip Routcliffe	Davenport	Runs	122
Floyd Lauman	Quincy	Hits	132
Lew Whistler	Evansville	HR	22
Philip Routcliffe	Davenport	SB	105

=== 1890 Central Interstate League ===
(aka Western Inter-State League)

Team standings	W	L	PCT	GB	Managers
Evansville Hoosiers	52	32	.619	–	Bill Harrington
Burlington Hawkeyes	48	36	.571	4	Varney Anderson / William Fuller
Terre Haute Hoosiers	42	35	.545	6½	Phil Reccius / Andrew Kolley; George Brackett
Quincy Ravens	41	42	.494	10½	Billy Murray
Peoria Canaries	34	40	.459	13	Michael Hurley / John McCloskey
Galesburg Pavers / Indianapolis	11	43	.204	NA	Charles Powers

Galesburg (6–22) transferred to Indianapolis May 27; the franchise disbanded July 8. No playoffs were held.

Player statistics
Player	Team	Stat	Tot	Player	Team	Stat	Tot
Albert Fisher	Quincy	BA	.309	John Dolan	Evansville	W	25
Frank Shugart	Burlington	Runs	80	Edward Eiteljorge	Evansville	PCT	.724 21–8
Frank Shugart	Burlington	Hits	108				
George McVey	Terre Haute	HR	12				
