= Wiley Dunham =

American baseball player (1877–1934)

- Pitcher
- Born: January 30, 1877; Piketon, Ohio, U.S.
- Died: January 16, 1934 (aged 56); Cleveland, Ohio, U.S.
- Batted: Unknown Threw: Unknown

MLB debut
- May 24, 1902, for the St. Louis Cardinals

Last MLB appearance
- June 21, 1902, for the St. Louis Cardinals

MLB statistics
- Win–loss record: 2–3
- Earned run average: 5.68
- Strikeouts: 15
- Stats at Baseball Reference

Teams
- St. Louis Cardinals (1902)

Henry Houston "Wiley" Dunham (January 30, 1877 – January 16, 1934) was an American professional baseball player. He was a pitcher for one season (1902) with the St. Louis Cardinals. For his career, he compiled a 2–3 record, with a 5.68 earned run average, and 13 strikeouts in 38 innings pitched.

He was born in Piketon, Ohio and died in Cleveland, Ohio at the age of 56.

Buried in Mound Cemetery Piketon, Ohio
