= Chet Carmichael =

American baseball player (1888–1960)

- Pitcher
- Born: January 9, 1888; Muncie, Indiana
- Died: August 22, 1960 (aged 72); Rochester, New York
- Batted: Right Threw: Right

MLB debut
- September 5, 1909, for the Cincinnati Reds

Last MLB appearance
- September 23, 1909, for the Cincinnati Reds

MLB statistics
- Win–loss record: 0–0
- Strikeouts: 2
- Earned run average: 0.00
- Stats at Baseball Reference

Teams
- Cincinnati Reds (1909)

Chester Keller Carmichael was a Major League Baseball pitcher for the 1909–10 Cincinnati Reds.
