= Larry Pratt (baseball) =

American baseball player (1887–1969)

- Catcher
- Born: October 8, 1887; Gibson City, Illinois, U.S.
- Died: January 5, 1969 (aged 81); Peoria, Illinois, U.S.
- Batted: Right Threw: Right

MLB debut
- September 19, 1914, for the Boston Red Sox

Last MLB appearance
- August 17, 1915, for the Newark Pepper

MLB statistics
- Batting average: .193
- Home runs: 1
- Runs batted in: 2
- Stats at Baseball Reference

Teams
- Boston Red Sox (1914); Brooklyn Tip-Tops (1915); Newark Pepper (1915)

Lester John Pratt (October 8, 1887 – January 8, 1969) was an American catcher in Major League Baseball in 1914 and 1915.

== Sources ==
- Career statistics from Baseball Reference · Retrosheet · Baseball Almanac
