= Phil Ketter =

American baseball player (1884-1965)

- Catcher
- Born: April 13, 1884; St. Louis, Missouri, U.S.
- Died: April 9, 1965 (aged 80); St. Louis, Missouri, U.S.
- Batted: Unknown Threw: Right

MLB debut
- May 23, 1912, for the St. Louis Browns

Last MLB appearance
- May 25, 1912, for the St. Louis Browns

MLB statistics
- Games played: 2
- At bats: 6
- Hits: 2
- Stats at Baseball Reference

Teams
- St. Louis Browns (1912)

Philip Ketter (born Philip Ketterer; April 13, 1884 – April 9, 1965) was an American Major League Baseball catcher who played for the St. Louis Browns in 1912.
