= Bill Popp =

American baseball player (1877–1909)

- Pitcher
- Born: June 7, 1877; St. Louis, Missouri, U.S.
- Died: September 5, 1909 (aged 32); St. Louis, Missouri, U.S.
- Batted: Unknown Threw: Right

MLB debut
- April 19, 1902, for the St. Louis Cardinals

Last MLB appearance
- July 21, 1902, for the St. Louis Cardinals

MLB statistics
- Win–loss record: 2–6
- Earned run average: 4.92
- Strikeouts: 20
- Stats at Baseball Reference

Teams
- St. Louis Cardinals (1902)

William Peter Popp (June 7, 1877 – September 5, 1909) was an American Major League Baseball pitcher who played for the St. Louis Cardinals in 1902. He later was a manager in the minor leagues in 1904 with the Vincennes Alices.
