= Staunton, Illinois =

- City
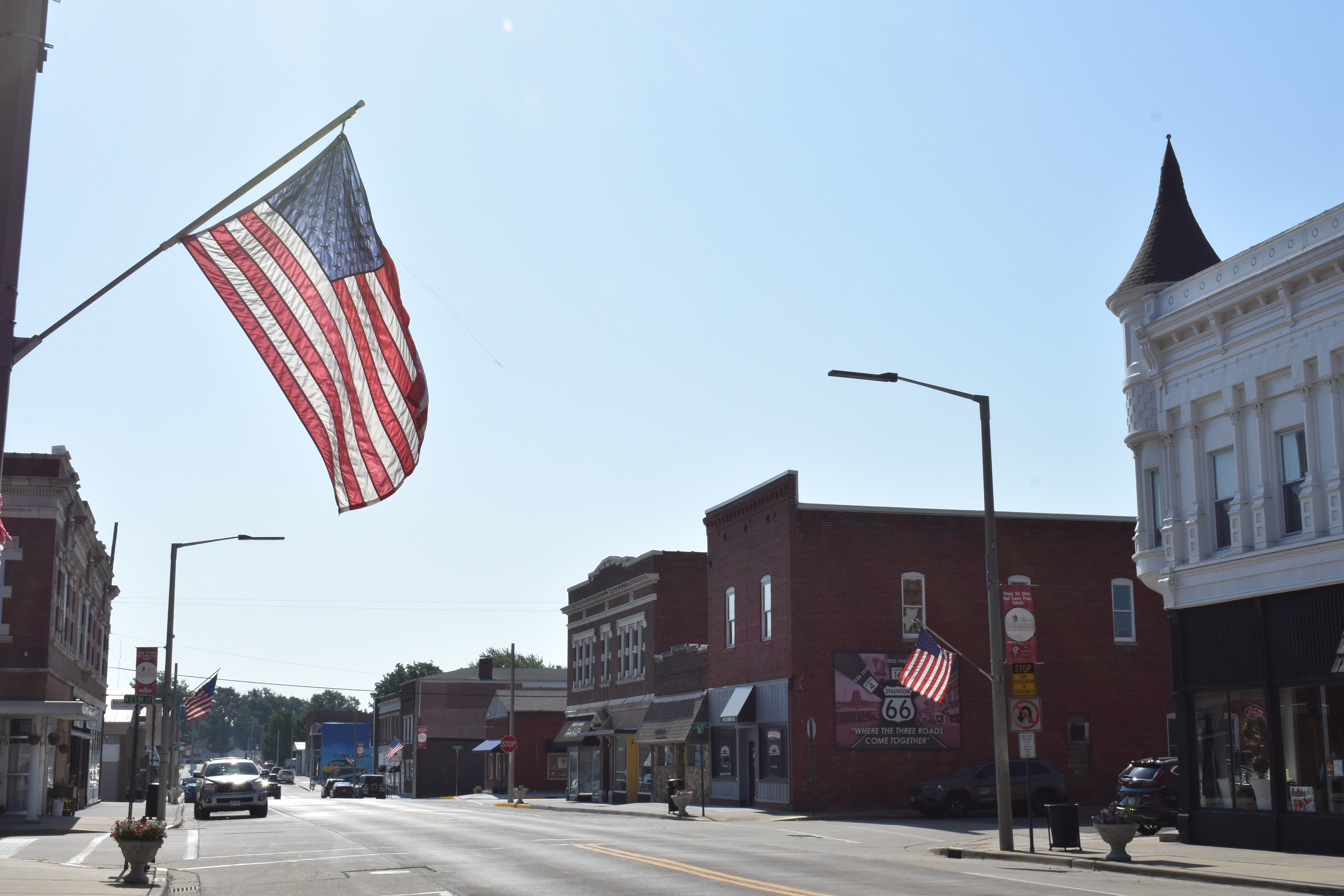
- Downtown Staunton

- Location in Macoupin County, Illinois
- Coordinates: 39°0′40″N 89°47′17″W
- Country: United States
- State: Illinois
- County: Macoupin
- Townships: Staunton, Dorchester

Area
  - Total: 4.01 sq mi (10.38 km^{2})
  - Land: 3.97 sq mi (10.29 km^{2})
  - Water: 0.035 sq mi (0.09 km^{2})
- Elevation: 623 ft (190 m)

Population (2020)
  - Total: 5,054
  - Density: 1,271.8/sq mi (491.04/km^{2})
- Time zone: UTC−6 (CST)
  - Summer (DST): UTC−5 (CDT)
- ZIP code: 62088
- Area code: 618
- FIPS code: 17-72403
- GNIS feature ID: 2395959
- Website: www.cityofstauntonil.com

Staunton is the second largest city in Macoupin County, Illinois, United States. As of the 2020 census, the population was 5,054.

== History ==
=== Name origins ===
A settler named Stanton bought land in the area and donated the land to a nearby village. The village decided to name the town Stanton after the original settler. An application for the town's incorporation was sent to Washington DC where it was approved but misspelled as Staunton due to the name being similar to Staunton, Virginia.

=== Early history ===
In 1817, John Wood became the first colonial settler to settle in what is now downtown Staunton. The town slowly grew and by the town's incorporation in 1859, had a schoolhouse, general store, a doctor's office and a mill. Staunton grew with the introduction of the railroad and a coal mine in the 1860s. New immigrants from Ireland, Germany and Italy moved to Staunton, and the community soon became one of the largest cities in southern Illinois. The Staunton Star-Times started publication in 1878. In 1891, Staunton applied for city status and elected its first mayor, F. E. Godfrey.

==== Coal mining ====
Coal mining characterized the city for nearly a century. Henry Voge opened the first coal mine in 1869 ("The Gin Shaft"). Two large mounds of slag that rise from prairie farmland on the outskirts of Staunton tell much about the history and the present status of the small city. The size of the piles indicates many years of deep shaft coal production, while the weeded erosions indicate the tipples have been idle for years. Mining started here shortly before the Civil War. It ended shortly before World War II. When the shafts were operating, they provided most of the employment in the town.

Staunton Local 755 became the largest coal miners' union in the state. The Labor Temple was built in 1914 by the local union. The front doors of this fine structure opened onto an attractive lobby with a wide stairway to the second floor on the right and a ticket office centered between two entrances to a large auditorium which had a sloping floor, aisles between three sections of comfortable seats and in front a large, well-arranged stage. This auditorium had the first air conditioning system to be found anywhere within 35 miles (56 km) of Staunton. From Tuesday through Sunday it was a theatre showing first-run movies for many years. The musical film Don't Give Up the Ship gave inspiration to local high school students in writing the Staunton High School fight song Don't Give Up the Fight. The first Monday of each month the Miners Union held their meeting there. The other Mondays could be booked for graduations, dramatic or musical productions by local groups, speakers, etc. Upstairs were toilet facilities, several small conference or committee meeting rooms, and a large hall where lodges met and dances and receptions could be held.

The last coal mine in Staunton closed in 1951.

=== 20th century ===
In the 1920s, Staunton accomplished the building of several notable institutions such as Lake Staunton, Staunton Community High School and the Staunton Fire Department. Staunton's population reached at all-time high during the 1920s. In 1941 the treasury department approved for a mural to be painted in the Staunton Post Office. The mural is "Going to Work" (Ralf Henrikson, completed 1941). It was the subject of a documentary, Silver Lining, about federal-sponsored art projects in Illinois during the Great Depression.

In the 1950s, the Illinois Traction system ran its last passenger train through Staunton, leading to a substantial decline in business in the area. Interstate 55 was built in 1956 and bypassed the historic Route 66 that passed through staunton cementing the continued decline of Staunton. In 1959, Staunton celebrated its 100th anniversary.

==== 1918 Staunton Riot ====
Beginning on February 12, 1918, Staunton experienced two days of mob vigilantism and rioting that gained attention nationwide. Two men were tarred and feathered, with scores of others forced to kiss the American flag and sign loyalty pledges. The demonstration was initiated by members of the United Mine Workers, Local Union 755, who decided to "Americanize" the city through vigilante tactics.

The riot began at 9 p.m. at a meeting of Local Union 755 at Labor Temple, where a $100 donation was being ratified to help defend Severino Oberdan from a previous charge of seditious talk that violated the Espionage Act. Oberdan's lawyer, John L. Metzen, had been summoned from Chicago by telegram to attend, but after being barred entrance went to his hotel. After Oberdan was accused of being an organizer for the Industrial Workers of the World, a fight broke out, with twenty members of a newly deputized police force (the "American Vigilantes") charging the hall and handcuffing Oberdan. Metzen was seized from the hotel lobby, and he was clubbed by police before being marched down a dark street where he was stripped and a bucket of tar poured over his head. Both men were driven to the outskirts of Staunton where they were pointed in opposite directions and told not to return.

Working under the direction of the American Protective League, the mob of men and women was reported to be as large as 400 persons, many of whom began storming homes of suspected pro-Germans and IWW supporters. They were dragged from their homes to a stand where, under threat of being tarred, they were forced to kiss the American flag and sign a pledge of loyalty. These actions were continued into the early morning and resumed the next day. More than 100 homes were visited, including that of former County Clerk William C. Seehausen, who was forced to kiss the flag next to a boiling pot of tar. Brothers Harry and John Mlekush were socialists who had flown the red flag from their home, but were forced to replace it with a U.S. flag and sing "The Star-Spangled Banner".

The police did nothing to stop the attacks, claiming citizens were exercising their patriotic duty during a special emergency. Chief of Police Benjamin G. Volentine stated, "No official report of a disturbance has been made to me. The only report I have received is that there are a lot more Americans in Staunton today than there was yesterday." Nine alleged "pro-Germans" were arrested on February 13.

Metzen claimed he had walked naked for three hours before being helped by some farmers who gave him clothing. When he returned to Chicago the Chicago Bar Association moved that he be disbarred for unprofessional conduct. Oberdan made it to Worden, Illinois, where he was treated by a physician. Two months later U.S. Marshal Vincent Y. Dallman reported 82 "German alien enemies" living in Staunton. In May the Staunton Vigilance Corps of the State Council of Defense posted signs that demanded that only English be spoken in public. The German language was also dropped from the curriculum at Zion.

The area press gave enthusiastic support to the actions. The Staunton Star-Times announced that "the members of Local Union 755 [were] to be heartily congratulated on what they accomplished." Other district papers not only supported them but implied that such actions were required elsewhere in the area. The Mt. Olive Herald congratulated the vigilantes and issued a warning: "To Staunton belongs the honor of being first in the county in a real loyalty demonstration...In the future, anyone with pro-German tendencies will do well to keep their mouths shut." The Gillespie News commended the citizens and explained that while "we are not believers in mob violence...under the existing circumstances we are for it, and every man who took part in the Staunton demonstration should be given a medal." The Chicago Tribune commended the crowd for its "zealous Americanism". The governor of Illinois, Frank Orren Lowden, also supported what the local union did. "The people in Staunton who took the ‘Pros to a cleaning are not mobs...They were the best citizens that can be found in the great state of ours."

== Geography ==
Staunton is located in southeastern Macoupin County. Its southern border is the Madison County line. Illinois Route 4 passes through the city as North Edwardsville Street, Hibbard Street, West Pearl Street, and South Hackman Street. Route 4 leads north 21 miles (34 km) to Carlinville, the Macoupin county seat, and south 28 miles (45 km) to Lebanon. U.S. Route 66 once passed through the east side of the city, leading northeast 56 miles (90 km) to Springfield, the state capital, and southwest 43 miles (69 km) to St. Louis. Interstate 55 now passes 2 miles (3 km) east of Staunton, supplanting Route 66.

According to the U.S. Census Bureau, Staunton has a total area of 4.01 square miles (10.39 km^{2}), of which 0.035 square miles (0.09 km^{2}), or 0.87%, are water. The city is drained to the west by tributaries of Ginseng Creek, which leads to Cahokia Creek, a west-flowing direct tributary of the Mississippi River. The easternmost part of the city drains south to tributaries of Silver Creek, part of the Kaskaskia River watershed leading south to the Mississippi.

=== Climate ===
Staunton

Climate chart (precipitation, max. and min. temperature)
J	F	M	A	M	J	J	A	S	O	N	D
75 1 −4	66 1 −3	73 14 −1	209 20 7	116 25 12	134 27 18	51 28 19	129 28 18	98 26 13	107 21 8	61 13 2	100 3 −4
- █ Average max. and min. temperatures in °C
- █ Precipitation totals in mm
Imperial conversion
J	F	M	A	M	J	J	A	S	O	N	D
3 34 25	2.6 34 27	2.9 57 30	8.2 68 45	4.6 77 54	5.3 81 64	2 82 66	5.1 82 64	3.9 79 55	4.2 70 46	2.4 55 36	3.9 37 25
- █ Average max. and min. temperatures in °F
- █ Precipitation totals in inches

== Demographics ==
Historical population
Census	Pop.	Note	%±
1880	1,358		—
1890	2,209		62.7%
1900	2,786		26.1%
1910	5,048		81.2%
1920	6,027		19.4%
1930	4,618		−23.4%
1940	4,212		−8.8%
1950	4,047		−3.9%
1960	4,228		4.5%
1970	4,396		4.0%
1980	4,744		7.9%
1990	4,806		1.3%
2000	5,030		4.7%
2010	5,139		2.2%
2020	5,054		−1.7%
U.S. Decennial Census

=== 2020 census ===
As of the 2020 census, Staunton had a population of 5,054. The median age was 41.3 years. 22.9% of residents were under the age of 18 and 20.8% of residents were 65 years of age or older. For every 100 females there were 91.2 males, and for every 100 females age 18 and over there were 88.6 males age 18 and over.

95.3% of residents lived in urban areas, while 4.7% lived in rural areas.

There were 2,166 households in Staunton, of which 28.4% had children under the age of 18 living in them. Of all households, 44.8% were married-couple households, 18.4% were households with a male householder and no spouse or partner present, and 29.5% were households with a female householder and no spouse or partner present. About 33.3% of all households were made up of individuals and 17.9% had someone living alone who was 65 years of age or older.

There were 2,377 housing units, of which 8.9% were vacant. The homeowner vacancy rate was 2.3% and the rental vacancy rate was 7.3%.

Racial composition as of the 2020 census
Race	Number	Percent
White	4,731	93.6%
Black or African American	13	0.3%
American Indian and Alaska Native	10	0.2%
Asian	25	0.5%
Native Hawaiian and Other Pacific Islander	0	0.0%
Some other race	11	0.2%
Two or more races	264	5.2%
Hispanic or Latino (of any race)	88	1.7%

=== 2010 census ===
As of the census of 2010, there were 5,139 people and 2,258 households in the city. The population density was 1,678.3 inhabitants per square mile (648.0/km^{2}). There were 2,153 housing units at an average density of 943.6 per square mile (364.3/km^{2}). The racial makeup of the city was 97.6% White, 0.3% African American, 0.3% Native American, 0.5% Asian, 0.1% Pacific Islander, 0.01% from other races, and 1.1% from two or more races. Hispanic or Latino of any race were 0.74% of the population.

=== 2000 census ===
In 2000, there were 2,020 households, out of which 32.1% had children under the age of 18 living with them, 53.6% were married couples living together, 11.2% had a female householder with no husband present, and 31.5% were non-families. 28.7% of all households were made up of individuals, and 15.5% had someone living alone who was 65 years of age or older. The average household size was 2.45 and the average family size was 3.00.

In the city, the age distribution of the population showed 25.6% under the age of 18, 8.1% from 18 to 24, 27.4% from 25 to 44, 20.5% from 45 to 64, and 18.5% who were 65 years of age or older. The median age was 38 years. For every 100 females, there were 91.6 males. For every 100 females age 18 and over, there were 84.8 males.

The median income for a Staunton household rose from $35,893 in 2000 to $43,720 in 2010, and the median income for a family was $44,630 at the turn of the millennium. Males had a median income of $35,000 versus $21,121 for females. The per capita income for the city was $16,905. About 4.0% of families and 6.6% of the population were below the poverty line, including 10.0% of those under age 18 and 4.0% of those age 65 or over.

The city reached its peak population in 1920, with a population of 6,027. It suffered a decline until 1950, when it reached 4,047.

=== Population of Staunton and nearby cities and villages ===
	1900	1910	1920	1930	1940	1950	1960	1970	1980	1990	2000
US	76,212,168	92,228,531	106,021,568	123,202,660	132,165,129	150,844,547	179,325,671	203,210,158	226,545,805	248,709,873	281,421,906
Illinois	4,821,550	5,638,591	6,485,280	7,630,654	7,897,241	8,712,176	10,081,158	11,113,976	11,426,596	11,430,602	12,419,293
Staunton	2,786	5,048	6,027	4,618	4,212	4,047	4,228	4,396	4,744	4,806	5,030
Livingston†		1,092	1,365	1,447	1,115	999	964	916	949	928	825
Litchfield	5,918	5,971	6,215	6,612	7,048	7,208	7,330	7,190	7,204	6,883	6,815
Edwardsville	4,157	5,014	5,336	6,235	8,008	8,776	9,996	11,070	12,480	14,579	21,491

†No census data gathered for Livingston in 1900, since it was not yet incorporated.

As the above data shows, Staunton experienced quite robust growth in the early part of the 20th century. Compared to other cities/villages in the area, Staunton has held its own relatively speaking. While standouts such as Edwardsville have continued to experience robust growth even to this day, Staunton's modest growth is favorable when compared to neighboring Livingston.

== Government ==
The city of Staunton is split into four wards in order to maximize efficiency in civic maintenance and representation. The city is divided into its east and west by Union Street and into its north and south by Main Street. The first, second, third, and fourth wards are in the northeast, southeast, southwest, and northwest corners respectively. Each ward is represented on the city council by two alderman, one serving a four-year term, and one serving a two-year term.

== Religion ==
- Lutheran Church established in 1847.
- Catholic Church established in 1867.

== Media ==
The Staunton Star-Times has been Staunton's newspaper since 1878.

== Education ==
In 1993, Staunton High School won the IHSA Basketball championship.

In 2004, Staunton School District absorbed the Livingston Schools District due to declining enrollment in the latter.

Staunton Community Unit Schools provides K-12 education for the city. The school district has one elementary school, one middle school and one high school, Staunton High School.

== Notable people ==
- Harold Brodkey, writer and novelist; born in Staunton
- Bruno Gaido, WWII naval aviation machinist and gunner; born outside of Staunton
- Archibald Hoxsey, American aviation pioneer who worked for the Wright Brothers; born in Staunton
- Henry Keupper, pitcher for the St. Louis Terriers; born in Staunton
- Lou Rochelli, second baseman for the Brooklyn Dodgers; born in Staunton
- Hampton W. Wall, Illinois state legislator and banker; born on a farm near Staunton
