= Paris Parisians (Eastern Illinois League) =

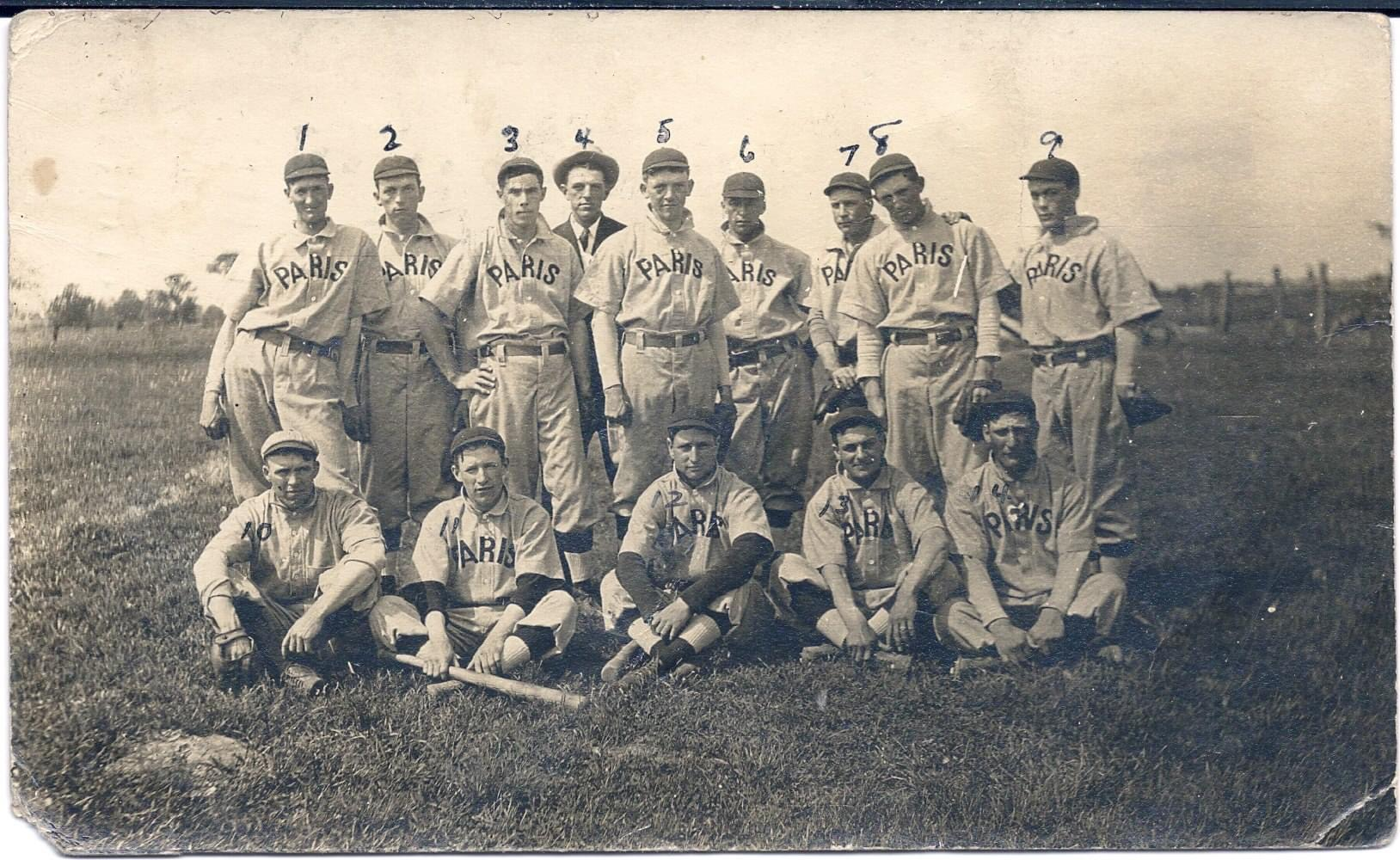
Paris Parisians, 1908

The Paris Parisians were an Eastern Illinois League baseball team based in Paris, Illinois that played during the 1908 season. That season, team executive L. A. G. Schoaff was elected president and secretary of the Eastern Illinois League. The club earned a spot on Sporting Life's "Base Ball Chronology", which according to the periodical was "the complete and concise record of the most wonderful year in the history of the national game." The team's mention on the record was due to an 18-inning match it played against Danville on June 11, which ended in a tie. On June 29, mere weeks after the team's 18-inning affair, the team sold first baseman Charley Staley to the Washington Senators of Major League Baseball's American League.

Paris, Illinois first gained a team in the Eastern Illinois League during the 1907 season when the Paris Colts replaced the Centralia White Stockings. The owners of the previously independent Paris franchise purchased the Centralia franchise and chose to replace all the Centralia players with the Paris players. The franchise finished the 1907 season with a 51-67 won-lost record, 23 games behind the league leading Mattoon Giants. However, after the move to Paris the team played much better and actually had a winning record of 44-41. The team was named the Parisians in 1908.

The Parisians were the last team to play in Paris until 1950, when the Paris Lakers began play.

A separate team of the same name, based in Paris, Tennessee, played in the Kentucky–Illinois–Tennessee League from 1923–1924.
