= Danville, Illinois minor league baseball history =

Danville Baseball Team
- 1888–1982; (1888–1889, 1900, 1906, 1908, 1910–1914, 1922–1932, 1946–1954, 1970–1976, 1982); Danville, Illinois

Minor league affiliations
- Previous classes: Class A (1970–1976, 1982); Class D (1906, 1908, 1951–1954); Class B (1910–1914, 1922–1932, 1946–1950)
- League: Midwest League (1970–1976, 1982)
- Previous leagues: Mississippi–Ohio Valley League (1951–1954); Illinois–Indiana–Iowa League (1910–1914, 1922–1932, 1946–1950); Eastern Illinois League (1908); Kentucky–Illinois–Tennessee League (1906); Central League (1900); Illinois–Indiana League (1889); Central Interstate League (1888)

Major league affiliations
- Previous teams: California Angels (1982); Los Angeles Dodgers (1975–1976); Milwaukee Brewers (1971–1974); New York Giants (1954); Chicago White Sox (1953); Boston Braves (1952); Brooklyn Dodgers (1946–1950); St. Louis Cardinals (1927–1932)

Minor league titles
- League titles: 6 (1927, 1930, 1951, 1954, 1972, 1974)

Team data
- Previous names: Danville Suns (1982); Danville Dodgers (1975–1976); Danville Warriors (1970–1974); Danville Dans (1951–1954); Danville Dodgers (1946–1950); Danville Veterans (1922–1932); Danville Speakers (1908, 1910–1914); Danville Old Soldiers (1906); Danville Champions (1900); Danville Browns (1888, 1889)
- Previous parks: Danville Stadium

Several different minor league ballclubs have been based in the town of Danville, Illinois, fielding teams in 38 seasons between 1888 and 1982 under various monikers. The Danville Suns (1982), Danville Dodgers (1975–1976), Danville Warriors (1970–1974), Danville Dans (1951–1954), Danville Dodgers (1946–1950), Danville Veterans (1922–1932), Danville Speakers (1908, 1910–1914), Danville Old Soldiers (1906), Danville Champions (1900) and Danville Browns (1888, 1889) were the minor league teams. Danville teams played at Soldiers Home Park (1922–1932) and Danville Stadium (1946–1982).

In 1989, the Danville Dans of the collegiate summer league began play in the Prospect League.

== Danville team history ==
The 1888 Danville Browns were the first professional team in Danville, playing in the Central Interstate League and the Illinois–Indiana League in 1889. The Danville Champions played in the Central League in 1900 and the Danville Old Soldiers in the Kentucky–Illinois–Tennessee League in 1906.

The Danville Speakers played in the Eastern Illinois League in 1908 and in the Illinois–Indiana–Iowa League (Three-I League) from 1910 to 1914. Major leaguers Medric Boucher, Cecil Coombs, Bob Fisher, Buck Hopkins, Pete Hildebrand, Hosea Siner, Bert Graham, Rube Sellers, Connie Walsh, Otto Vogel, Walt Devoy and Hod Eller played for the Speakers in its short time in existence under that moniker. They moved to Moline, Illinois and became the Moline Plowboys during the 1914 season.

The Danville Veterans rejoined the Three-I League in 1922–1932, winning league championships in 1927 and 1930. Danville was an affiliate of the St. Louis Cardinals from 1927–1932.

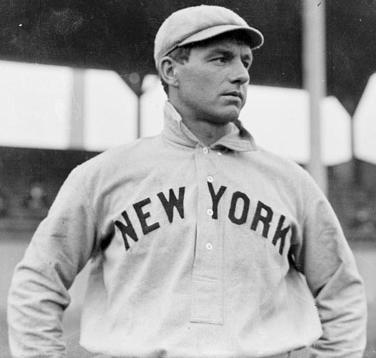
Joe McGinnity, 1946 Baseball Hall of Fame Inductee

After World War II, the Brooklyn Dodgers came to town with their Danville Dodgers affiliate in the Three-I League.

In 1946 the Dodgers looked to have Roy Campanella and Don Newcombe play for the Danville Dodgers. Campanella and Newcombe signed contracts with Danville, but never played there after the idea of integrating received push back. Instead, the players went to the Nashua Dodgers.

After the Dodgers left, the team remained as the Danville Dans, joining the Mississippi–Ohio Valley League and winning the 1951 Championship and later capturing the Midwest League Championship in 1954, reflecting the new league name of the old Mississippi-Ohio Valley League. The Dans were affiliated with the Boston Braves (1952), Chicago White Sox (1953) and New York Giants (1954).

After a period of fifteen seasons without a minor league team, the 1970 Danville Warriors rejoined the Midwest League, playing at Danville Stadium. The Warriors were a co-op club in 1970, before becoming a Milwaukee Brewers affiliate in 1971 and remained a Brewers farm club through 1974. The Warriors experienced their share of success in their five years. They were Southern Division first half champions in 1971 (losing to Quad Cities in the playoffs); won the Southern Division in both halves in 1972, going on to win the Midwest league championship; again won the division first half championship in 1973, beating Decatur in the first round of the playoffs but losing in the championship round to Wisconsin Rapids; and winning the second half division championship in 1974, going on to win the league title by defeating Quad Cities and Appleton in succession.

The Danville Dodgers name was reborn in 1975, when it became a Los Angeles Dodgers farm club for two seasons. The franchise folded after the 1976 season.

The 1982 Danville Suns rejoined the league for one season as an affiliate of the California Angels. The franchise relocated to Peoria, Illinois to become the Peoria Chiefs in 1983. The Danville Dans of the summer collegiate Prospect League have played since 1989, utilizing Danville Stadium.

== Ballparks ==
Danville minor league teams played at Soldiers Home Park from 1922 to 1932. Teams between 1946 and 1982 played at Danville Stadium. Danville Stadium is still in use by today's Danville Dans and is located at 610 Highland Boulevard in Danville, Illinois.

== Danville alumni ==
=== Baseball Hall of Fame alumni ===
- Joe McGinnity (1922) Inducted 1946
- Red Ruffing (1923) Inducted 1967

=== Notable alumni ===
- Dick Schofield (1982)
- Devon White (1982) 7 x GG; 3 x MLB All-Star
- Dave Stewart (1976) MLB All-Star; 1989 World Series MVP; 1990 Roberto Clemente Award; 1987 AL Wins Leader
- Pedro Guerrero (1975) 5 x MLB All-Star; 1981 World Series MVP
- Jerry Augustine (1974)
- Dick Davis (1974)
- Bill Castro (1972-1973)
- Sam Mejias (1972-1973)
- Tom Hausman (1972)
- Sixto Lezcano (1972)
- Charlie Moore (1972)
- Eduardo Rodriguez (1972)
- Pedro Garcia
- Darrell Porter (1971) 4 x MLB All-Star; 1982 World Series MVP
- Gorman Thomas (1971) MLB All-Star; 2 × AL HR Leader (1979, 1982)
- Bill Travers (1971) MLB All-Star
- Cecil Cooper (1970) 5 x MLB All-Star; 1983 Roberto Clemente Award; 2 × AL RBI Leader (1980, 1983)
- Leon Wagner (1954) MLB All-Star; 1962 All-Star Game MVP
- Walt Moryn (1949) MLB All-Star
- Carl Erskine (1947) MLB All-Star; 2 x MLB No-hitter
- Morrie Martin (1947)
- Cal Abrams (1946)
- Toby Atwell (1946) MLB All-Star
- Preston Ward (1946)
- Bill Beckmann (1932)
- Como Cotelle (1930)
- Bob Klinger (1930-1932)
- Ed Heusser (1931) 1944 NL ERA Leader
- Bill DeLancey (1931)
- Billy Myers (1929-1930)
- Ray Starr (1926, 1930) MLB All-Star
- Roger Wolff (1930)
- Hal Smith (1929)
- Ripper Collins (1928) 3 x MLB All-Star; 1934 NL HR Leader
- Tony Cuccinello (1928) 3 x MLB All-Star
- Paul Derringer (1927-1928) 6 x MLB All-Star
- Allyn Stout (1928)
- Hack Miller (1927)
- Heinie Schuble (1927)
- Phil Weintraub (1927)
- Roy Johnson (1925)
- Hick Cady (1924, MGR)
- Harry Rice (1923)
- Hod Eller (1914)
- Frank Huelsman (1900)
- Harry McIntire (1900)
- George Rohe (1900)
- John Grim (1888)
- Jerry Harrington (1888)
