= Mattoon Giants =

The Mattoon Giants were an Eastern Illinois League baseball team based in Mattoon, Illinois, USA, that played from 1907 to 1908. They were managed by Charles O'Day in 1907 and George Kiser in 1908.

The major league pitcher Grover Lowdermilk, who spent nine seasons at the big league level, played for them.
