= Baseball Guides =

There have been several Baseball Guides since the 19th century - the Spalding Guide and Reach Guide were the primary ones for decades. The two merged eventually and then were replaced by the Guides put out by The Sporting News. The main features of the Spalding and The Sporting News Guides have been detailed coverage of minor league results; since the late 1920s they have contained annual statistics for the vast majority of minor leagues. Several Guides have been official publications, such as the Barnes & Company one in 1945 or the Sporting News ones from the late 1940s through early 1990s. In the days when multiple competing guides were used, it is not as clear which guide is being referred to. The Sporting News ceased publication after their Guide following the 2006 edition, leaving the Baseball Almanac as the sole major statistic annual.

== Earliest baseball guides ==
... the Beadle Baseball Guides ... began to appear in 1859 or 1860 and were continued for about twenty years. They were the first continuous series of baseball guides in the world, and contain a huge mass of information relating to the national game that is nowhere else to be found.
