= Burlington Pathfinders =

- 1906–1916; (1889–1890, 1895–1898, 1904–1916); Burlington, Iowa

Minor league affiliations
- Class: Independent (1889–1890, 1895); Class B (1895–1898); Class D (1904–1916)
- League: Central Interstate League (1889–1890); Illinois-Iowa League (1890); Eastern Iowa League (1895); Western Association (1895–1898); Iowa State League (1904–1907); Central Association (1908–1916)

Major league affiliations
- Team: None

Minor league titles
- League titles (3): 1906; 1909; 1915

Team data
- Name: Burlington Babies (1889); Burlington Hawkeyes (1890); Burlington Colts (1895–1897); Burlington Hawkeyes (1898); Burlington River Rats (1904); Burlington Flint Hills (1905); Burlington Pathfinders (1906–1916)
- Ballpark: Athletic Park

The Burlington Pathfinders were a minor league baseball team based in Burlington, Iowa. The Pathfinders played as members of the Class D level Iowa State League from 1906 to 1907 and Central Association from 1908 to 1916, winning league championships in 1906, 1909 and 1916.

The Pathfinders were preceded by Burlington teams that played as members of the Independent Central Interstate League (1889–1890), Illinois-Iowa League (1890) and Eastern Iowa League (1895) before a tenure as members of the Class B level Western Association from 1895 to 1898.

In 1914, the Burlington Pathfinders hosted an exhibition game in Burlington against the St. Louis Browns, winning the game 5-4.

The Burlington Pathfinders and the earlier Burlington teams played home minor league games at Athletic Park in Burlington, which hosted minor league games through 1937.

Two Baseball Hall of Fame members played for Burlington. Bud Fowler played with the 1890 Burlington Hawkeyes. Amos Rusie signed his first professional contract and played with the 1889 Burlington Babies before making his major league debut weeks later.

== History ==
Organized baseball was played in Burlington as early as 1867, when a team called the Burlington Crescents played games against other town teams. Due to large crowds at their games, the city of Burlington was chosen as the site to host a state baseball tournament in 1867.

=== 1889 & 1890: Central Interstate League ===
Burlington first hosted minor league baseball in 1889, when the Burlington "Babies" became members of the six-team Central Interstate League. Burlington joined the Davenport Hawkeyes, Evansville Hoosiers, Peoria Canaries, Quincy Ravens and Springfield Senators teams in beginning league play on April 27, 1889.

Besides being known as the Babies, the 1889 Burlington team, was also called the "Lightweights." The Lightweights nickname was reportedly due to Burlington having numerous players of smaller stature on their roster.

In their first season of minor league baseball play, Burlington named William Henry Lucas as their manager for the 1889 season. Besides four playing appearances as a pitcher in 1887, Lucas was a minor league manager and executive in his baseball field career. He came to Burlington after beginning his managerial career with the Duluth Jayhawks in 1886 and 1887, In 1888, Lucas managed the Davenport Hawkeyes franchise, who played in both the Central Interstate League, which folded during the season with Davenport in first place, and the Western Association to finish the 1888 season. From 1900 to 1910 Lucas served as the founder or president of numerous minor leagues beginning with the 1900 Montana State League and ending with the 1912 Union Association.

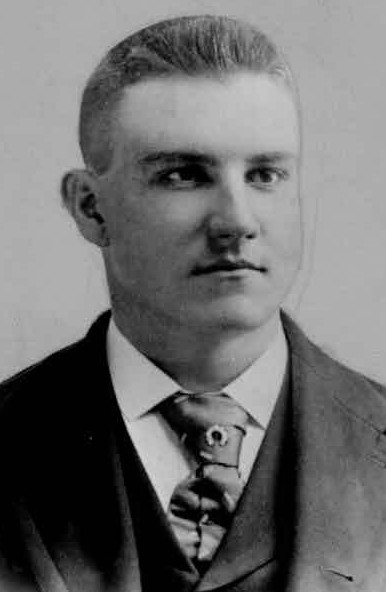
(1890) Amos Rusie, New York Giants. Rusie made his professional debut pitching for Burlington in 1889 and made his major league debut that season. Rusie was inducted into the Baseball Hall of Fame in 1977.

In 1889, at the age of 18, Baseball Hall of Fame member Amos Rusie pitched his first professional games with the Burlington Babies. Rusie joined Burlington after playing semiprofessional baseball and working at a factory in Indianapolis, Indiana. In semiprofessional baseball, Rusie had thrown shutouts against the National League member Boston Beaneaters and Washington Nationals teams in two exhibition games. After the two standout pitching performances, John T. Brush, owner of the National League’s Indianapolis Hoosiers signed Rusie to a professional contract. Frank Bancroft the Indianapolis manager assigned Rusie to Burlington to begin his career. Rusie pitched in four games for Burlington before making his major league debut. Rusie made his major league debut with the Indianapolis Hoosiers on May 9, 1889. Rusie went on to a storied career pitching for the Indianapolis Hoosiers, New York Giants (1890–1898) and briefly with the Cincinnati Reds (1901). Rusie was traded from the Giants to the Reds in 1901 after experiencing arm trouble, hearing damage from a line drive to the head, and other problems in 1898 that kept him out of baseball for two years. Rusie then retired with a career record of 245 wins against 174 losses, with 1,934 strikeouts and a career 3.07 ERA. He was inducted into the Baseball Hall of Fame in 1977.

At age 15, pitcher Willie McGill played for Burlington in 1889. McGill began the 1889 season with the playing in the Central Interstate League with the Evansville Hoosiers. He threw a no-hitter against the Davenport Hawkeyes before losing six straight games and being acquired by Burlington, for whom he pitched for the remainder of the season. After his season with Burlington, the next season, at age 16, Kelly made his major league debut with the 1890 Cleveland Infants. That season he suffered tragedy when his father died that season in a railroad crash while coming to assist his son who had a drinking problem at the time and been arrested for a drunken assault. McGill also pitched Cincinnati Kelly's Killers, St. Louis Browns, Cincinnati Reds, Chicago Colts, St. Louis Browns and the Philadelphia Phillies in his major league career, which ended at the age of 22. McGill attended the University of Notre Dame. Following his playing career, McGill later served as a collegiate baseball coach and athletic trainer for Butler University, University of Illinois and Northwestern University.

In their first season of play, the Burlington Babies ended the 1889 Central Interstate League in third place. Burlington ended the season with a record of 55–62 to achieve their third-place finish in the six-team league. The Burlington manager in their first season was William Henry Lucas. Burlington finished 11.5 games behind the first place Quincy Ravens in the final Central Interstate League standings and no playoffs were held, common in the era.

The Central Interstate League continued play in 1890 with the Burlington "Hawkeyes" remaining as a league member of the six-team league. Burlington became known by the Hawkeyes nickname when the Davenport franchise did not return to the league. The state of Iowa is nicknamed as the Hawkeye State. Burlington was the only Iowa team to play in the 1890 Central Interstate League.

After William Lucas left Burlington and became the manager of the Tacoma Daisies team in the Pacific Northwest League, Burlington's 1890 player-manager Varney Anderson came to Burlington after pitching in 1889 for the major league Indianapolis Hoosiers team. After his season with the Burlington Hawkeyes, Varney later pitched for the Washington Senators in the 1894 and 1895 seasons. Varney had a career record of 9-20 with a 6.16 ERA in 35 major league games.

In their second season of Central Interstate League play, the 1890 Burlington Hawkeyes ended the season as the league runner-up in a shortened season. The Hawkeyes ended their season with an overall record of 48–36, with their second-place finish being led by managers Varney Anderson and William Fuller. The Central Interstate League ended play on August 17, 1890 and Burlington finished 4.0 games behind the first place Evansville Hoosiers in the six-team league final standings. Burlington's Frank Shugart led the Central Interstate League with both 80 runs scored and 108 total hits in the shortened season.

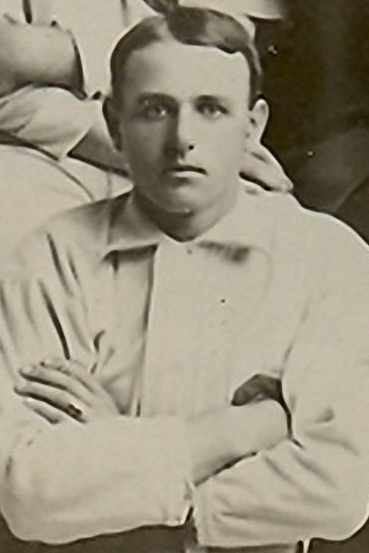
(1890) Frank Shugart, Chicago White Sox. Shugart led the league in hits and runs scored playing for Burlington in 1890. In 1901, he was banned from baseball for an assault on an umpire.

After the season with Burlington ended on August 17, Frank Shugart played the remainder of the 1890 season with the Chicago Pirates. He continued his major league career playing with the Pittsburgh Pirates, St. Louis Browns, Louisville Colonels, Philadelphia Phillies and Chicago White Sox teams through 1901, playing in 745 career games and batting .267. Shugart's major league career ended after an incident on August 21, 1901, in which he punched an umpire in the face. During an argument in a game against the Washington Senators, umpire Jack Haskell had pulled out his watch to give Shugart one minute to get to the bench, but Shugart failed to comply and instead attempted to grab Haskell’s watch away from him. At the same time, teammate Joe Sugden shoved Haskell, and while Haskell was off-balance, Shugart punched him in the face. After being punched, Haskell held Shugart in a headlock before police, players, and spectators intervened. Shugart was arrested by police, jailed and paid a fine. In the aftermath, he became the first American League player to be banned from baseball, which happened because of the incident. On August 23, 1890, American League founder and president Ban Johnson banned Shugart from the American League for life, stating "I have expelled Shugart from the league for life for assaulting Umpire Haskell. No slugging will be permitted in this league in the future while I am president of it, and each man who commits that offense will be expelled forthwith. That is final."

After the folding of the Central Interstate League on August 17, 1890, the Burlington franchise continued their season after joining a new league in September 1890.

=== Second 1890 team: Illinois–Iowa League / Hall of Fame player ===
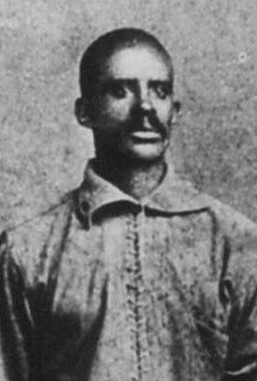
(1885) Bud Fowler, Keokuk Hawkeyes. Fowler played for Burlington in 1890, competing in the Illinois–Iowa League. Fowler batted .322 on the season. Fowler was inducted into the Baseball Hall of Fame in 2022.

After the folding of the Central Interstate League, the Burlington Hawkeyes continued play in a second minor league in 1890 due to a relocation. The Aurora Hoodoos, Cedar Rapids Canaries, Dubuque Giants, Joliet Convicts, Monmouth Maple Cities, Ottawa Pirates, Ottumwa Coal Palaces and Sterling Blue Coats teams began play on May 1, 1890, as charter members of the Illinois-Iowa League without Burlington.

During the season, Sterling had compiled a record of 21–51 when the team moved to Galesburg, Illinois on July 31, 1890. While based in Galesburg, the team had compiled a record of 8–17 while based in that city, when the franchise moved to Burlington on September 4, 1890. The Burlington Hawkeyes team then disbanded on September 10, 1890, and the league ended the season with seven teams. After compiling a 1–4 record while based in Burlington, the Sterling/Galesburg/Burlington team ended the season with an overall record of 30–72. Despite folding before the end of the season, Burlington was given an eighth-place finish in the eight-team league. In the three locations, the team was managed by James Donnelly, Charles Wirsche, Al Weddige, Clarence Hoyt and Varney Anderson.

Baseball Hall of Fame member Bud Fowler played with the 1890 Burlington Hawkeyes during their short tenure in the Illinois-Iowa League. At age 32, Fowler batted .322 on for the 1890 season. Fowler was the first professional black baseball player, beginning his baseball career in 1878, only one year after the first minor league was organized. In the early days of professional baseball there was no official color line. Fowler played in organized baseball with white teams until the color line became established practice. He played until 1904, at age 46. A native of Cooperstown, New York, Fowler was inducted into the Baseball Hall of Fame, located in his hometown, in 2022. Fowler's induction speech was given by Dave Winfield, who said, "Fowler made baseball history today, but he's always been a part of American history."

The Burlington franchise did not return to the 1891 Illinois-Iowa League, replaced in the eight-team league by the eventual champion Quincy Ravens team. The Following the 1890 season, Burlington did not host another minor league team until 1895.

=== 1895: Controversial Eastern Iowa League ===
After a four season hiatus, Burlington returned to minor league play when the 1895 Burlington "Colts" were formed and became members of the eight-team, independent Eastern Iowa League. The Burlington Colts joined the Cedar Rapids Rabbits, Clinton Bridegrooms, Dubuque Colts, Galesburg Trotters, Ottumwa Brownies, Rock Island Tri-Cities and Waterloo Indians teams in league play. The Eastern Iowa League began play on May 10, 1895, as an eight–team league. Playing in the day game era, the local businesses of the home team regularly closed when their team hosted home games.

The 1895 Burlington team was also called the "Spiders" in some references.

Former major league player Paul Hines became the Burlington Colts' player-manager in 1895. Hines had a 20-season major league career through 1891 and he compiled 2,133 hits and a .302 career batting average in 1658 career games, playing for nine different teams. Hines won the Triple Crown in 1878 and a second batting championship in 1879. At age 40, Hines played 21 games at first base for Burlington in 1895.

The 1895 Eastern Iowa league had a tumultuous season in their only season of play. After the season began, three teams were "expelled" from the league. One of the teams was expelled twice and another team folded. On June 14, 1895, both the Clinton Bridegrooms and the Rock Island Tri-Cities teams were expelled from the Eastern Iowa League. The Galesburg Trotters franchise folded on June 25, 1895. After their expulsion from the league, on July 4, 1895 the Clinton Bridegrooms were allowed to rejoin the Eastern Iowa League. However, on July 8, 1895, just four days after being reinstated, the Clinton Bridegrooms were expelled from the league for a second time, along with the Waterloo Indians, who were expelled from the Eastern Iowa League the same day.

In the final standings, Burlington finished in second place, as the Dubuque Colts (66–31) had the best overall record in the Eastern Iowa League, which ended the season with four teams. Dubuque won the Eastern Iowa League championship by winning both halves of the league's split season schedule, so no playoff was held. With an overall record of 52–39, the Burlington Colts ended the season 11.0 games behind Dubuque in their second place finish. Burlington pitcher Jake Weimer led the league with both 18 wins and 148 strikeouts and teammate Leroy Hackett hit 13 home runs and also scored 97 runs to lead the Eastern Iowa League in both categories.

The Eastern Iowa League did not return to minor league play in 1896 and permanently disbanded after the 1895 season was completed on August 25, 1895. The Burlington franchise continued play in a new league to end the 1895 season.

=== 1895 Second team / Western Association ===
On August 30, 1895, after the Eastern Iowa League season ended, the Burlington Colts continued minor league play in a new league. The Burlington Colts joined the Class B level Western Association as an expansion team and were incorporated into the league. The Dubuque Giants franchise of the Eastern Iowa League entered the Western Association with Burlington, creating a ten-team league. Burlington and Dubuque joined the Des Moines Prohibitionists, Jacksonville Jacks, Lincoln Treeplanters, Omaha Omahogs, Peoria Distillers, Quincy Ravens, Rockford Forest City and the St. Joseph Saints teams in completing the final portion of the 1895 season, which ended on September 25, 1895.

Continuing play in their new league with Paul Hines and Bill Krieg serving as managers, the Burlington Colts compiled a 13–13 record in completing the 1895 Western Association season. The Lincoln Tree planters won the league championship and Bill Krieg, who began the season with Rockford won the league batting title, hitting .452 with 237 total hits.

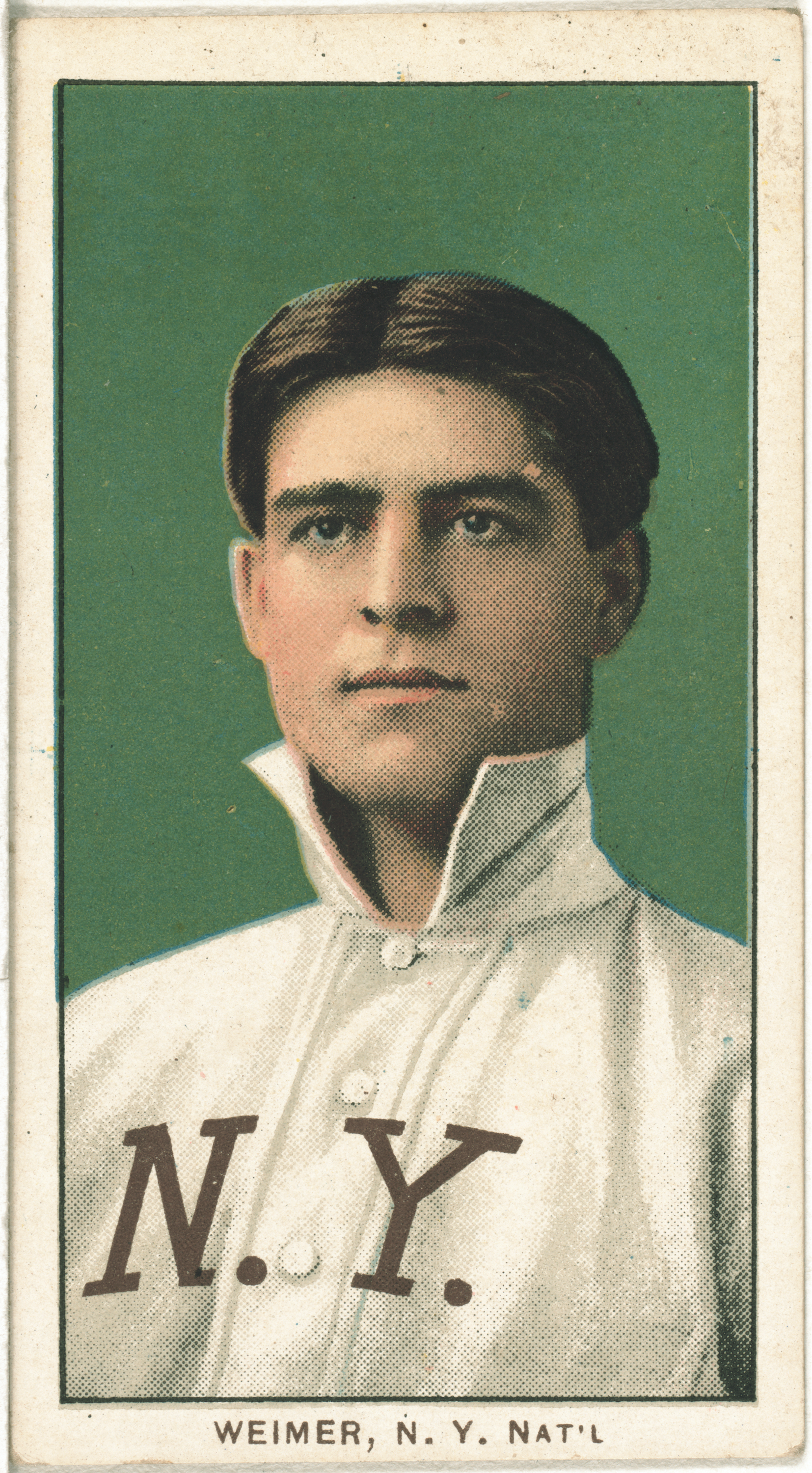
(1909) Pitcher Jake Weimer, New York Giants, baseball card . An Iowa native who pitcher for Burlington in 1895 and 1897, Weimer compiled a major league career ERA of 2.23, ranking 14th all time.

Ottumwa, Iowa native Jake Weimer pitched for Burlington in both 1895 and 1897, beginning his professional career. Although he did not make his major league debut until he was age 29, as Weimer pitched for eight years in the minor leagues, he became one of the top left-handed pitchers in baseball. Weimer's career ERA of 2.23 ranks 14th all-time, just behind Mariano Rivera and Walter Johnson and he is ranked 10th all-time among post-1900 era pitchers. Beginning with the 1903 Chicago Cubs, Weimer had a record of 21–9 with a 2.30 ERA in his 1903 rookie season, following up with a 20–14 record and a 1.91 ERA in 1904 and an 18–12 record with a 2.26 ERA for the 1905 Chicago Cubs. In his major league career, Weimer posted a 97–69 record with 657 strikeouts and a 2.23 ERA in 1472 2/3 innings pitched, while also pitching with the Cincinnati Reds (1906–1908) and New York Giants (1909).

After joining the league to play the final weeks of the 1895 season, both Burlington and Dubuque continued play in 1896 Western Association.

=== 1896 to 1898: Western Association ===
In 1896, the Burington Colts and Dubuque teams continued play as members of the eight team, Class B level Western Association after joining the league at the end of the 1895 season. Burlington and Dubuque continued league play with the Cedar Rapids Bunnies, Des Moines Prohibitionists, Peoria Distillers, Quincy Bluebirds, Rockford Forest City and St. Joseph Saints teams, as the league schedule began on April 23, 1896.

The eight-team Western Association ended their season on August 1, 1896, with Burlington in the lower tier of the league standings. The Burlington Colts were in sixth place with a 28–51 record when the league folded. The Colts ended the season in sixth place in the eight-team league, while playing the season under managers Paul Hines and Bob Caruthers. Burlington finished 28.5 games behind the first place Des Moines Prohibitionists in the final standings, as the league held no playoffs.

In his first professional season, Topsy Hartsel played for the Burlington team in 1897 at age 23. Hartzel played 14-seasons in the major leagues as was an outfielder for the Louisville Colonels (1898–99), Cincinnati Reds (1900), Chicago Orphans (1901) and Philadelphia Athletics (1902–11). Hartzel played o on the 1910 World Series champion Athletics and led the American League in stolen bases and runs scored in 1902. He led the American league in bases on balls five times in his career. In his 14-year career, he played in 1,356-game major league games, and recorded a .276 batting average with 826 runs, 31 home runs, 341 RBI, 247 stolen bases and 837 bases on balls and an OBP of .384.

Before the 1910 World Series, Philadelphia A's manager Connie Mack asked all his players to "take the pledge" not to drink alcohol during the World Series. Hartsel told Mack he needed a drink the night before the final game and Mack told him to do what he thought best, but in these circumstances "if it was me, I'd die before I took a drink." In the clinching Game 5 of the series, Mack chose Hartsel as the leadoff hitter for Philadelphia and he led off the game with a single and stolen base to score a run. In the game he played left field and scored two runs with two stolen bases in the 7-2 victory over the Chicago Cubs at West Side Grounds in Chicago. It was the only game Hartsel played during the series.

Pitcher Frank Kitson played for the 1897 Burlington Colts had compiled a 14–17 record for the Colts when he was promoted to the major leagues. On August 12, 1897, Kitson was purchased from Burlington by the Baltimore Orioles and he immediately joined the roster of major league Orioles. Oriole manager Ned Hanlon arranged for the acquisition of Kitson without having seen him pitch in person. Making his first major league start for Baltimore on May 19, 1898, Kitson threw a complete game shut against the Pittsburgh Pirates. Pitching in 249 major league games with the Baltimore Orioles (1898–1899), Brooklyn Superbas (1900–1902), Detroit Tigers (1903–1905), Washington Senators (1906–1907) and New York Highlanders (1907), Kitson had a career 128–117 record with a 3.18 ERA. As a hitter, he had a career .240 batting average with 4 home runs and 95 RBI.

Despite folding before completing the previous season, the Western Association continued play in 1897 as an eight-team Class B level league. The Burlington Colts team finished the 1897 season in last place. The Colts ended the Western Association season with a final record of 39–85 and ended the season in eighth place. Burlington was managed by Dal Williams and Bob Berryhill. With their last place finish, Burlington finished 44.5 games behind the first place Cedar Rapids Bunnies in the final standings. Louis Lippert of the Burlington Colts had 76 stolen bases to lead the Western Association.

In 1898, the Burlington team was known as the "Hawkeyes," at the franchise continued play in the eight-team Western Association. The Hawkeyes folded before the end of the season. The Burlington Hawkeyes team folded on June 5, 1898. Burlington had a record of 7–17, playing the season under manager Bill Krieg when the team folded. Shortly after Burlington folded, the Cedar Rapids Bunnies folded on June 9, 1898, leaving the Western Association with six remaining teams. When the Rock Island-Moline Islanders team disbanded on June 26, 1898, it caused the Western Association to disband.

=== 1904 to 1907: Iowa State League ===
In 1904, Burlington resumed minor league play, when the Burlington "River Rats" were formed and the team became charter members of the Iowa State League Burlington joined the newly formed league, which was formed as an eight-team, Class D level league, consisting entirely of Iowa based franchises. The River Rats joined the Boone Coal Miners, Fort Dodge Gypsum Eaters, Keokuk Indians, Marshalltown Grays, Oskaloosa Quakers, Ottumwa Snappers and Waterloo Microbes teams in beginning league play on May 6, 1904. The Iowa State League had the formal name as the "Iowa League of Professional Baseball Clubs".

The "River Rats" nickname corresponds to Burlington's location and history as a port on the Mississippi River.

The first Burlington franchise no hitter game was thrown on May 17, 1904. Burlington River Rat pitcher J.H. Mekenson defeated the Ottumwa Snappers 4-0 in the game, striking out 5.

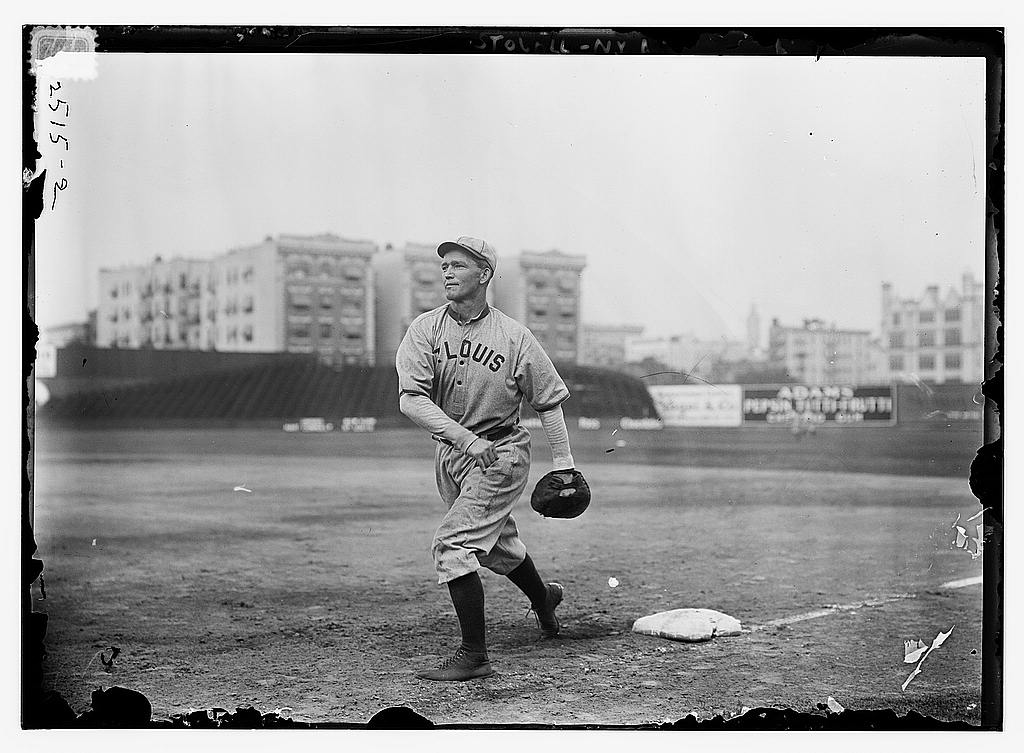
(1904) George Stovall, St. Louis Browns. Stovall was the player-manager for Burlington to begin the 1904 season. He was purchased by the Cleveland Naps from Burlington and began his major league career.

During the 1904 season, Burlington player-manager George Stovall left the team when he was promoted to the major leagues, making his debut on July 4, 1904, playing for the Cleveland Naps. Stovall was batting .300 for Burlington at the time at age 26. Stovall's contact he was sold to Cleveland for a figure reported to be between $700 and $1,000. Stovall subsequently began a tenure as a major league player and then became a manager. Stovall played for the Naps (1904–1911), St. Louis Browns (1912–1913) and the Federal League's Kansas City Packers (1914–1915). Stovall served as a player-manager for each team beginning in 1911. In 1913, Stovall was initially suspended for spitting tobacco juice on umpire Charlie Ferguson after having taken Ferguson's cap and thrown it to the ground. However, American League president Ban Johnson ultimately ordered that Stovall be fired. He was immediately succeeded by Branch Rickey as manager of the Browns.

In their first season of play in the new Iowa State League, the Burlington River Rats ended their 1904 season in last place. Burlington ended the Iowa State League season with a final 36–73 record to finish in eighth place in the eight-team league. The Burlington managers George Stovall, F.L. Sullivan, and Bob Black led the team during the season, as they finished 35.5 games behind the first place Ottumwa Snappers.

Prior to joining Burlington as their manager in 1904, Bob Black was the player-manager for the 1903 Le Mars Blackbirds of the Iowa–South Dakota League. With Le Mars, Black signed Baseball Hall of Fame member Branch Rickey to his first professional baseball contract at age 18. After his playing career ended, Rickey became a manager and then a front office executive, best known for signing Jackie Robinson to the Brooklyn Dodgers while serving as Brooklyn's General Manager.

In 1905, the Burlington team became known as the "Flint Hills." The nickname corresponds to local history. The area now known as Burlington, Iowa, was originally called "Shoquoquon" (Shok-ko-kon), meaning "Flint Hills" by the Sauk and Meskwaki peoples, who gathered flint there, which was used for their for tools and weapons. The Burlington city site was first called Flint Hills in 1833 and was renamed to Burlington in 1844.

The 1905 Burlington Flint Hills finished in last place in the 1905 Iowa State League. In their second consecutive last place finish, Burlington ended the season with a 37–83 record. The Flint Hills managers were Rusty Owens, Tommy Reynolds and Charlie Frisbee as the team finished in eighth place in the eight-team league. Burlington ended the season 37.5 games behind the first place Ottumwa Snappers, who won their second consecutive championship.

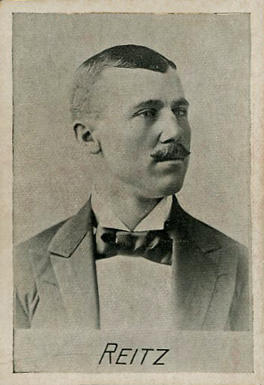
(1894) Heinie Reitz, Baltimore Orioles, baseball card. Reitz played with Burlington in 1905 after playing on three pennant winning teams in Baltimore.

Second basemen Heinie Reitz played for Burlington Flint Hills in 1905 at age 38. Reitz had previously played in the major leagues with the Baltimore Orioles, Washington Senators, and Pittsburgh Pirates, last appearing in a major league game in 1898. Reitz had a career batting average of .292 and an OBP of .363, playing in seven major league seasons. He played on three pennant winning teams in Baltimore, In 1905 with Burlington, Reitz batted .200 in 15 games and 50 at bats.

==== 1906 Pathfinder championship season ====
In 1906, Burlington became known at the "Pathfinders." The Pathfinder is a Burlington nickname. The Burlington High School yearbook is called The Pathfinder.

New Burlington Pathfinder manager Ned Egan began a four-season successful tenure with Burlington in 1906. Eagan came to Burlington after managing the 1905 Keokuk Indians. Egan managed sixteen total seasons in the minor leagues through the 1917 season with the Waterloo Lions when he was 39. Ned Egan died on May 6, 1918, at age 40 in Chicago, Illinois. Egan, who was nicknamed as the "Connie Mack" of the minors, was found dead in his room at the Grand Pacific Hotel having been despondent over his ill health. Egan had sustained a major back injury from a collision while ice skating near his home in Minnesota. The injury had caused him to resign his 1918 managerial position and 3-year contract with the [Milwaukee Brewers.

Led by Ned Egan, the 1906 Burlington Pathfinders went from last place to first place in winning the Iowa State League championship. The Pathfinders ended the season with a record of 83–39 and finished in first place in the final Iowa State League standings, capturing the championship of the eight-team league, as no playoffs were held. In the final standings, Burling was dominant, finishing a full 9.0 games ahead of the second place Oskaloosa Quakers and 38.5 games ahead of the eighth place Ottumwa Champs who went from first place to last place. Burlington's Cy Neighbors led the Iowa State League hitters with both 161 total hits and 96 runs scored.

In the 1907 season, at age 21 Cy Slapnicka, a member of the Cleveland Guardians Hall of Fame, played for Burlington. When his playing career ended after brief pitching tenures with the Chicago Cubs and Pittsburgh Pirates, Slapnicka served as the General Manager of the Cleveland Indians from 1935 to 1940, and then was a major league scout for the Indians through his retirement in 1961. As a scout, Slapnicka signed 31 major league players, including Baseball Hall of Fame members Bob Feller, Bob Lemon, Earl Averill, and Lou Boudreau as well as all-stars Mel Harder, Herb Score and Roger Maris.

At age 18, Lee Magee played for Burlington in 1907, in his first professional season, splitting the season in the league with Burlington and the Waterloo Cubs. After making his major league debut with the 1911 St. Louis Cardinals, Magee played for seven teams in nine seasons. He was briefly the manager of the 1915 Brooklyn Tip-Tops of the Federal League. In 1919, while playing with the Chicago Cubs, Magee and Hal Chase of the Philadelphia Phillies were both accused of fixing a game on August 31, 1919. The pair was indited by the Cook County, Illinois grand jury who were investigating the Black Sox scandal. In response to the inditement the Cubs and president Bill Veeck immediately released Magee. In 1920, Magee filed a lawsuit against the Chicago Cubs for $9,500 in lost wages and claimed to have damning counter evidence which would be the "biggest bomb in baseball history". A jury ruled in favor of the Cubs in the lawsuit on June 9, 1920. Magee never played in professional baseball again.

As the defending champions, the Burlington Pathfinders ended the 1907 Iowa State League season as the league runner-up. The Pathfinders final record of 77–51, left the team in second place under returning manager Ned Egan. In the eight-team Class D level league, Burlington finished 4.0 games behind the first place Waterloo Cubs, while drawing 43,420 fans to lead the league in attendance. John House of Burlington had a strong season for Burlington as he won the league batting title, hitting .308. House also led the Iowa State League with both 158 total hits and 91 runs scored.

Following the completion of the 1907 season, the Iowa State League changed names. Seven of the eight 1907 Iowa State League member teams continued play in 1908 as charter members of the Central Association.

=== 1908 to 1914: Burlington Pathfinders / Central Association ===
The Central Association formed in 1908, with the Burlington Pathfinders as a charter member. Burlington joined the Class D level league with six teams other that played with them in the 1907 Iowa State League. One new franchise joined in forming the new league. Burlington joined the Jacksonville Lunatics, Keokuk Indians, Oskaloosa Quakers, Ottumwa Packers, Quincy Gems and the Waterloo Lulus, all who had been members of the 1907 Iowa State League. The Kewanee Boilermakers based in Kewanee, Illinois, were a new franchise. The Central Association began the league schedule on May 7, 1908.

On May 31, 1908, pitcher Edward Eis of the Burlington Pathfinders threw the second Burlington no-hitter in franchise history in an 8-0 Burlington victory over the Ottumwa Packers. Eis had 5 strikeouts in the game.

In the first season of the newly formed league the Burlington Pathfinders finished the 1908 Central Association season in second place. Burlington was the 1908 runner-up in finishing with a normally dominant 83–41 record, playing the season under returning manager Ned Egan. Burlington ended the season 4.5 games behind the first place Waterloo Lulus, who ended their championship season with a final record of 88–37. No playoffs were held, which was common in the era. John House remained with Burlington in 1908 and won the first batting championship of the Central Association, hitting .306 on the season. Charles Rose of Burlington had 146 total hits, most in the league,

Burlington Pathfinders pitcher Ray Boyd defeated the Jacksonville Lunatics 3–0 and threw the third Burlington no-hitter in the road victory on June 18, 1909. Boyd walked 2 and had 4 strikeouts in the game. At age 22, Boyd threw 329 innings for Burlington in 1909, recording a 23–12 record with a 3.04 ERA on the season. In 1910, after his season with Burlington, Boyd made his major league debut with the St. Louis Browns.

Burlington pitcher Hack Spencer threw the second Burlington no-hitter of the season on September 12, 1909. Playing on the road at the Waterloo Lulus, Spencer walked 2 and struck out 6 batters in the game. Spencer won 27 games for Burlington in 1909, compiling a 27–13 record while throwing 350 innings on the season at age 24.

==== 1909 championship season ====
With Ned Egan managing the team for the final time, the 1909 Burlington Pathfinders won their second Central Association championship. The Pathfinders had a final record of 83–51 to finish in first place in the eight-team Central Association. No playoffs were held and Burlington finished just 1.0 game ahead of the second place Hannibal Cannibals (83–53) in the final standings. Fred Fenney, who played for both Ottumwa and Burlington during the season, won the league batting title, hitting .300. Burlington's George Manush led the league with both 149 total hits and 91 runs scored. Manush would later return to the Burlington team as a manager. Pitcher Collis Spencer of Burlington won 27 games, tops in the Central Association.

After his second championship with Burlington, Ned Egan did not return to Burlington in 1910, as he remained in the league as manager of the rival Ottumwa Packers. Phil Geier replaced Egan and became the Burlington manager in 1910. Geier had played in the major leagues with the Philadelphia Phillies, Cincinnati Reds, Philadelphia Athletics, Milwaukee Brewers and Boston Beaneaters between 1896 and 1904. The managerial position with Burlington was his only season as a manager and the 1910 season was his last season in professional baseball at age 33.

As defending league champions, Burlington Pathfinders ended the 1910 season in next to last place in the eight-team Central Association. Burlington ended season record of 56–81 to finish in seventh place. Playing under new manager Phil Geier, the pathfinders finished 31.5 games behind the first place Quincy Vets in the final standings of the eight-team Class D level league. Ned Egan's Ottumwa Packers finished in second place in 1910.

The 1911 season saw the Burlington improve as the Pathfinders were the Central Association league runner-up to their former manager's team. Burlington had an 81-44 record to finish in second place, playing the season under manager new manager Richard Rohn. The Pathfinders ended the season 4.5 games behind the first place Ottumwa Speedboys (87-41), who were managed by Ned Egan. George Watson of the Burlington Pathfinders scored 108 runs, most in the Central Association.

Manager Richard Rohn began his five-season tenure as the Burlington manager in 1911. Rohn played as a first baseman in the minor leagues from 1901 to 1913. Rohn had managed the 1910 Joplin Miners to the championship of the Western Association, while hitting .322 in 100 games for Joplin before joining Burlington in 1911. Previously, Rohn was a player-manager of the 1905 Sedalia Goldbugs and held the same role for the 1906 Webb City Goldbugs where he had replaced Tom Hayden, the future president of the Burlington franchise.

On June 27, 1912, Burlington pitcher Ralph Bell threw a no-hitter on the road against the Monmouth Browns. In the 12–0 Pathfinders' win, Bell walked 3 and struck out 9 batters in the complete game victory. Bell had won 21 games while pitching with Burlington in 1911 and after his no hit game, with a record of 12–8, he was purchased from Burlington by the Chicago White Sox and made his major league debut on July 16, 1912.

The 1912 Burlington Pathfinders ended their Central Association in third place. The Pathfinders had a record of 73–53 under returning manager Richard Rohn. No playoffs were held. The Pathfinders finished 4.5 games behind the first place Ottawa Speedboys and their manager Ned Egan. Burlington led the eight-team Central Association in home attendance, drawing 25,000. Harry Ellis of Burlington scored 100 runs to lead the Central Association. Doc Shanley batted .370 for Burlington in the 1912 season to finish second behind George Manush of Ottumwa, who hit .375 to lead the Central Association. Shanley was actually leading the league in hitting when he left the team in late August. His contract was purchased by the St. Louis Browns, where he was promoted to begin his major league career.

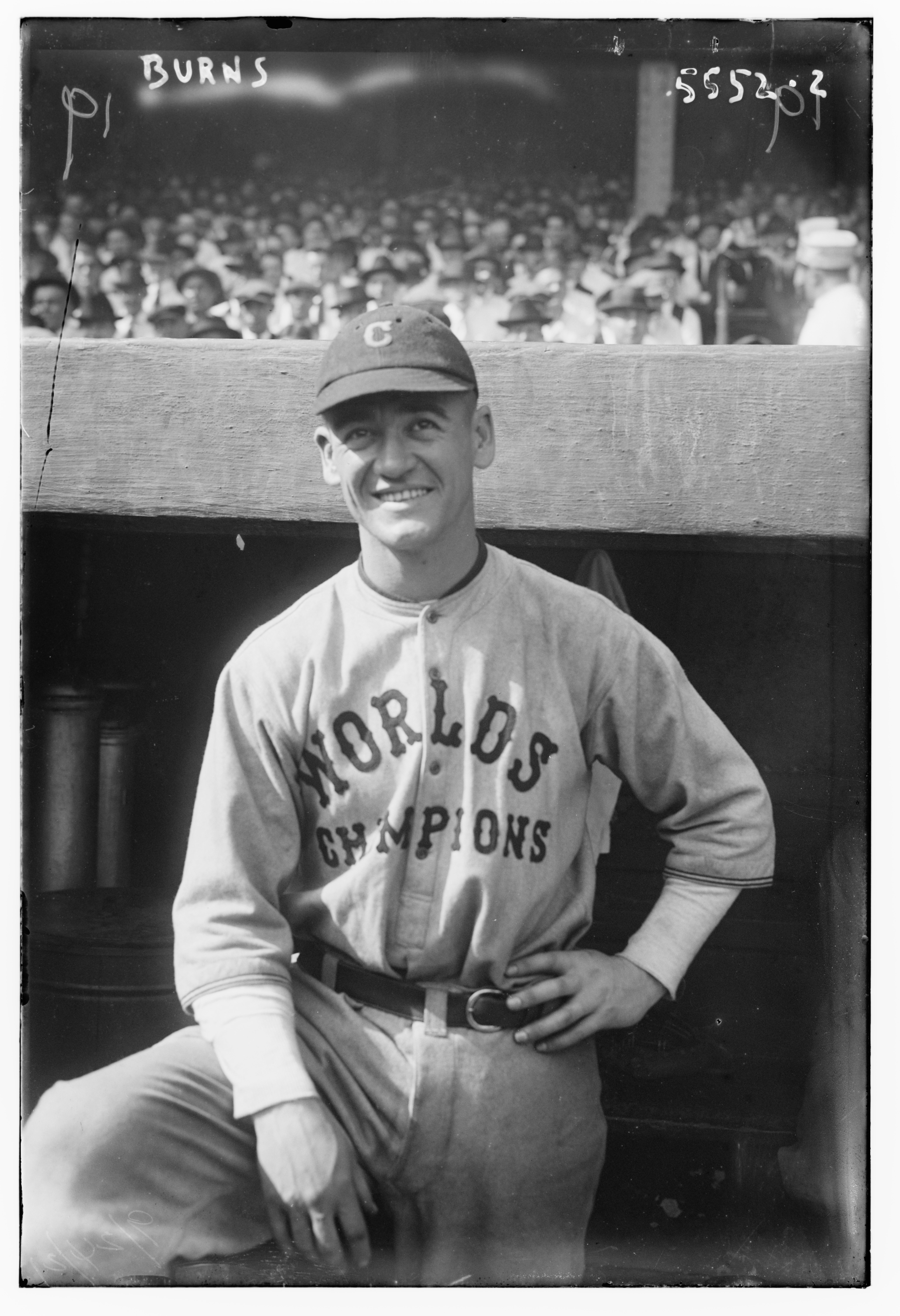
(1921) George Burns, Cleveland Indians. Burns played for Burlington in 1913 in his only minor league season. Burns was the 1926 AL Most Valuable Player and played on three World Series championship teams, retiring as a career .307 hitter.

At age 20, George Burns played for Burlington in 1913 in his first professional season, having signed his first professional contract in 1913 for $150 a month. Later in the 1913 season, Burns was moved to the Class A level Sioux City Packers in the Western Association. In 1914, after his only minor league season, Burns began his major league career at the first baseman for the Detroit Tigers. Burns was the AL 1926 Most Valuable Player playing for the Cleveland Indians, batting .358 and setting a then major league record with 64 doubles. In the era, players could win only one MVP award in their career. Burns retired as career .307 hitter, with 2,018 total hits. His 1,671 games at first base were the most by an AL right-handed player are third in major league history. Burns was on winning teams in the 1920 World Series, 1928 World Series and 1929 World Series.

The 1913 Burlington Pathfinders ended their season in fifth place in the eight-team Central Association final standings and finished under .500. With a record final of 63–66, Burlington continued play under returning manager Richard Rohn and Thomas Hayden. No playoffs held The Pathfinders finished 10.5 games behind of the first place Ottumwa Packers (72–54) and manager Ned Egan. Harry Ellis again led the league with 100 runs scored and also had a league best 156 hits. Burlington pitcher Elmer Jacobs led the league with 230 strikeouts.

Coming off his impressive season with Burlington in 1913, Elmer Jacobs made his major league debut in 1914 with the Philadelphia Phillies, His major league career spanned from 1914 to 1927, hit pitched for the Phillies, Pittsburgh Pirates, St. Louis Cardinals, Chicago Cubs, and Chicago White Sox, winning 50 career games against 81 losses with an ERA of 3.55. In 1926, Jacobs was suspended for 10 days after being caught with foreign substances while on the pitchers mound.

On July 19, 1914, Grover Baichley was acquired by the Burlington Pathfinders from the Champaign Velvets of the Illinois–Missouri League. The deal was completed by Burlington president Thomas C. Hayden, who also served as a scout for the American League's St. Louis Browns. At the time of the trade, Baichley had a 2.07 earned run average and a 15-2 win-loss record, having won 15 games in a row before the deal. He made his debut with Burlington on July 23, against the Rock Island Islanders, striking out 10 and throwing a three-hitter in an 8-1 Burlington victory. On August 12, 1914, Baichley and the Pathfinders defeated the St. Louis Browns in an exhibition game hosted at Burlington. After an undefeated season with Burlington, he was offered a contract by the St. Louis Browns and made his major league debut on August 24, 1914. His major league career was affected by lumbago.

Richard Rohn did not return to Burlington in 1914 and became manager of the Salina Coyotes. George Manush was hired to replace Rohn at age 29. Manush had been the player-manager of the Keokuk Indians in 1913 and had previously played for Burlington. A native of Tuscumbia, Alabama, George Manush was the older brother of Baseball Hall of Fame member Heinie Manush and was one of six Manush brothers to play professional baseball. A professional plumber, George Manush remained as a resident and business owner in Burlington and died in the city at age 37 in 1923 when he was electrocuted in an automobile accident. As a 17 year old, Heine Manush had lived and worked in Burlington with his older brother in George's plumbing business before embarking on his own baseball career.

On September 2, 1914, Burlington Pathfinder pitcher Fred "Lefty" Miller threw a near perfect game. Miller had 0 walks in the game, but an error by the first baseman prevented the perfect game. In the 4–0 Pathfinders' win, Miller struck out 14 batters in the road victory against the Keokuk Indians. At age 27, Miller had a 23–13 record for Burlington in 1914 with a 3.51 ERA, throwing exactly 300 innings on the season. Miller won 22 games in returning to Burlington in 1915.

The 1914 Burlington Pathfinders improved to second place in the eight-team Central Association. The Pathfinders had a final record of 75–53 to finish as the league runner-up in the eight-team league, managed by George Manush. Burlington ended the season 2.5 games behind the first place Waterloo Jays in the final standings. John Singleton of Burlington led the league with 158 total hits, while teammate Walt Meinert scored 94 runs, most in the league. Burlington pitcher Lefty Miller led the league with 23 wins, while teammate George Zackert had a milestone 305 strikeouts, most in the minor leagues.

During the 1914, Central Association season, Ned Egan's Ottumwa Packers team of the Central Association moved to Rock Island, Illinois on July 17, 1914. The National Association did not allow the Central Association to place a franchise in the territory of the Three-I League, so Rock Island then moved to Galesburg, Illinois on July 24, finishing the season in last place.

=== 1915: Final Central Association championship ===
Richard Rohn replaced George Manush and returned as the Burlington manager in 1915, leading the Pathfinders to the Central Association championship. In capturing the league championship the Burlington Pathfinders ended the season in first place with a final record of 81–38. No playoffs were held and Burlington finished a dominant 18.5 games ahead of the second place Muscatine Muskies (63–57). The league ended the season with seven teams after the Clinton Pilots folded during the season.

In the 1915 championship season, Walt Meinert returned to Burlington and scored 97 runs, and tied with his teammate Harmon Hagmon to lead the league in that category. Meinert also led the league with 137 total hits. Burlington's Cliff Lee led the league with 9 home runs. Pitcher Grover Baichley returned to Burlington and had a milestone 310 strikeouts and a 23–10 record.

Cliff Lee later played in the major leagues with the Pittsburgh Pirates, Philadelphia Phillies, Cleveland Indians, and Cincinnati Reds between 1919 and 1926. He had a career .300 batting average with 38 home runs, 216 RBIs, and a .344 on-base percentage in his career.

Pitcher Lefty Miller returned and won 22 games for Burlington in 1915, compiling a 22–10 record with a 2.42 ERA in 313 innings pitched at age 28. Miller did not pitch professionally again after the 1915 championship Burlington season. A Delano, Minnesota native, Miller had graduated from the College of St. Thomas in 1908, playing baseball collegiately with a 28–3 pitching record. Miller graduated from medical school, which he balanced with his baseball career. Miller embarked on a career as a physician after his professional baseball career ended.

=== 1916: Final Central Association season ===
As the defending league champions, the Burlington Pathfinders played their final season in 1916 and relocated during the Central Association campaign. On July 20, 1916, the Burlington Pathfinders had compiled a record of 41–29 playing under Richard Rohen when the team was relocated to Ottumwa, Iowa, finishing the season playing as the Ottumwa Packers. After compiling a record of 21–35 while based in Ottumwa, the team ended the season with an overall record of 62–64 to end the season in fourth place. Richard Rohn was replaced as manager by catcher George Boelzle during the season. The Burlington/Ottumwa team finished 14.5 games behind the first place Marshalltown Ansons in the final standings. During the Central Association season, the last place Muscatine Muskies, managed by Ned Egan, were forced to forfeit 34 wins.

The 1916 season was the only managerial role for George Boelzle in his 16-season minor league professional baseball career.

Neither Burlington, Ottumwa or Muscatine returned to membership in the 1917 Western Association, which folded following the completion of the 1917 season. Burlington next hosted minor league baseball in 1924, when the Burlington Bees were formed and began a lengthy tenure of play as members of the Class D level Mississippi Valley League.

== The ballpark ==
The Burlington Pathfinders and the earlier Burlington teams hosted home minor league games at Athletic Park. The ballpark hosted Burlington minor league home games through 1937.

On August 12, 1914, the Burlington Pathfinders played the St. Louis Browns in an exhibition game hosted at the ballpark in Burlington. Burlington defeated St. Louis by the score of 5-4 in the contest.

The ballpark was located on Summer Street in Burlington. The site was adjacent to the location of today's Southeast Iowa Regional Airport, which began air service in 1929.

== Timeline ==
Year(s)	# Yrs.	Team	Level	League	Ballpark
1889	1	Burlington Babies	Independent	Central Interstate League	Athletic Field
1890 (1)	1	Burlington Hawkeyes	Independent	Central Interstate League	Athletic Field
1890 (2)	1	Burlington Hawkeyes	Independent	Illinois-Iowa League	Athletic Field
1895 (1)	1	Burlington Colts	Independent	Eastern Iowa League	Athletic Field
1895(2)–1897	3	Burlington Colts	Class B	Western Association	Athletic Field
1898	1	Burlington Hawkeyes	Class B	Western Association	Athletic Field
1904	1	Burlington River Rats	Class D	Iowa State League	Athletic Field
1905	1	Burlington Flint Hills	Class D	Iowa State League	Athletic Field
1906–1907	2	Burlington Pathfinders	Class D	Iowa State League	Athletic Field
1908–1916	9	Burlington Pathfinders	Class D	Central Association	Athletic Field

== Year–by–year records ==
Year	Record	Finish	Manager	Playoffs/notes
1889	55–62	3rd	William Henry Lucas	No playoffs held
1890 (1)	48–36	2nd	Varney Anderson / William Fuller	League ended August 17; No playoffs held
1890 (2)	30–72	8th	James Donnelly / Charles Wirsche; Al Weddige / Clarence Hoyt; Varney Anderson	Sterling (21–51) moved to Galesburg July 31; Galesburg (8–17) moved to Burlington September 4; Burlington (1–4) disbanded September 10.
1895 (1)	52–39	2nd	Paul Hines	No playoffs held Schedule ended August 25
1895 (2)	13–13	NA	Paul Hines / Bill Krieg	Joined league August 30
1896	28–51	6th	Paul Hines / Bob Caruthers	League folded August 1
1897	39–85	8th	Dal Williams / Bob Berryhill	No playoffs held
1898	7–17	NA	Bill Krieg	Team folded June 5
1904	36–73	8th	George Stovall / F.L. Sullivan; Bob Black	No playoffs held
1905	37–83	8th	Rusty Owens / Tommy Reynolds; Charlie Frisbee	No playoffs held
1906	83–39	1st	Ned Egan	No playoffs held League champions
1907	77–51	2nd	Ned Egan	No playoffs held
1908	83–41	2nd	Ned Egan	No playoffs held
1909	83–51	1st	Ned Egan	No playoffs held League champions
1910	56–81	7th	Phil Geier	No playoffs held
1911	81–44	2nd	Richard Rohn	No playoffs held
1912	73–53	3rd	Richard Rohn	No playoffs held
1913	63–66	5th	Richard Rohn / Thomas Hayden	No playoffs held
1914	75–53	2nd	Thomas Hayden / George Manush	No playoffs held
1915	81–38	1st	Richard Rohn	No playoffs held League champions
1916	62–64	4th	Richard Rohn / George Boelzle	Burlington (41-29) moved to Ottumwa July 20; No playoffs held

== Notable alumni ==
- Bud Fowler (1890) Inducted Baseball Hall of Fame, 1922
- Amos Rusie (1889) Inducted Baseball Hall of Fame, 1977
- Varney Anderson (1889; 1890, MGR; 1898)
- Grover Baichley (1914–1916)
- Alex Beam (1889)
- Ralph Bell (1911–1912)
- Bob Black (1904, MGR)
- Coonie Blank (1908)
- Charlie Bold (1908)
- Ray Boyd (1909)
- Bill Bradley (baseball) (1897) Cleveland Guardians Hall of Fame
- Curly Brown (1911)
- Joe Burg (1907–1909)
- George Burns (1913) 1926 AL Most Valuable Player
- Harry Burrell (1896)
- Ike Butler (1898)
- Charlie Cady (1889)
- Joe Cantillon (1889)
- Bob Caruthers (1896, MGR; 1898)
- Dad Clark (1910)
- Fritz Clausen (1890)
- Gus Creely (1896)
- Billy Crowell (1890)
- Tom Daly (1906–1907)
- James Donnelly (1890, MGR)
- Dan Dugdale (1897)
- Max Flack (1911)
- Ossie France (1890)
- Charlie Frisbee (1905, MGR)
- Ed Gagnier (1905)
- Phil Geier (1910, MGR)
- Danny Green (1910)
- Frank Gregory (1916)
- Jim Hackett (1895)
- George Hale (1913-1914)
- Topsy Hartsel (1897)
- Ed Hawk (1911–1912)
- Hunkey Hines (1890)
- Paul Hines (1895-1896, MGR) 2x MLB batting title
- George Huff (1896)
- Elmer Jacobs (1913)
- Phil Ketter (1913)
- Walt Kinzie (1889)
- Frank Kitson (1897)
- Charlie Knepper (1897)
- Bill Krieg (1895, 1898 MGR)
- Lee Magee (1907)
- Lou Mahaffey (1896)
- Al Mannassau (1889) Umpire
- Hal Mauck (1890)
- Ed Mayer (1889)
- Tim McCabe (1914)
- Willie McGill (1889)
- Frank McManus (1910)
- Walt Meinert (1914, 1916)
- Danny Moeller (1905)
- Cy Neighbors (1906)
- Charlie Newman (1898)
- Pat O'Connell (1889)
- George Orme (1914)
- Billy Otterson (1889)
- Charlie Reising (1889)
- Heinie Reitz (1905)
- John Richter (1895–1896)
- Bill Rumler (1913)
- Cyclone Ryan (1889)
- Ike Samuels (1897)
- Joe Sargent (1916)
- Jack Scheible (1890)
- Frank Shugart (1890)
- Hal Schwenk (1914)
- Hank Severeid (1909)
- Doc Shanley (1912)
- Sam Shaw (1889)
- Cy Slapnicka (1907) Cleveland Guardians Hall of Fame
- Hack Spencer (1908–1909)
- Ben Stephens (1889–1890)
- George Stovall (1904, MGR)
- Babe Towne (1907)
- Dick Van Zant (1889)
- Joe Visner (1898)
- Bull Wagner (1909)
- Pete Weckbecker (1889–1890)
- Jake Weimer (1895)
- Jack White (1896)
- Cy Wright (1906)

== See also ==
- Burlington Pathfinders
- Burlington Babies players
- Burlington Hawkeyes players
- Burlington Colts players
- Burlington River Rats players
- Burlington Flint Hills players
