= Galesburg minor league baseball history =

Galesburg, Illinois minor league baseball teams
- 1890–1914; (1890, 1895, 1908–1912, 1914); Galesburg, Illinois

Minor league affiliations
- Class: Independent (1890, 1895); Class D (1908–1912, 1914)
- League: Illinois-Iowa League (1890); Central Interstate League (1890); Eastern Iowa League (1895); Illinois-Missouri League (1908–1909); Central Association (1910–1912, 1914)

Major league affiliations
- Team: None

Minor league titles
- League titles (0): None

Team data
- Name: Galesburg (1890); Galesburg Trotters (1895); Galesburg Hornets (1908); Galesburg Boosters (1909); Galesburg Pavers (1910–1912, 1914)
- Ballpark: Willard Field (1890, 1895); Illinois Field (1908–1912, 1914); Lombard College Field (1908–1912, 1914)

Minor league baseball teams were based in Galesburg, Illinois between 1890 and 1914. Galesburg teams played as members of the Central Interstate League and Illinois-Iowa League in 1890, Eastern Iowa League in 1895, the Illinois-Missouri League in 1908 and 1909 and the Central Association from 1910 to 1912 and 1914. Galesburg hosted home games at Willard Field, Illinois Field and Lombard College Field.

Baseball Hall of Fame members Bud Fowler (1890), Grover Cleveland Alexander (1909) and Sam Rice (1912) played for Galesburg teams.

== History ==
Minor league baseball started in Galesburg in 1890, with two teams playing in two leagues.

Galesburg first began play as members of the 1890 Central Interstate League. On May 27, 1890, Galesburg had a record of 6–22, when the Central Interstate League franchise moved to Indianapolis, Indiana. Then, on July 31, 1890, Galesburg gained another team, becoming members of the Illinois-Iowa League when the league member Sterling Blue Coats franchise moved to Galesburg. After an 8–17 record in Galesburg, the Sterling/Galesburg team moved to a third home, in Burlington, Iowa, where the team became the finished the season as the Burlington Hawkeyes. Burlington folded after a handful of games and a 30–72 overall record in the three cities.

Baseball Hall of Fame member Bud Fowler played for the Sterling/Galesburg/Burlington team in 1890, hitting .322 for the season and integrating the team and the Illinois-Iowa League.

In 1895, minor league baseball returned, as the Galesburg Trotters played as members of the Eastern Iowa League. The 1895 season was the only year of play for the independent level league. The 1895 Eastern Iowa League standings were composed of the Burlington Spiders (52–39), Cedar Rapids Rabbits (43–51), Clinton Bridegrooms (11–26), Dubuque Colts (66–31), Galesburg Trotters (13–27), Ottumwa Brownies (49–52), Rock Island Tri-Cities (14–18) and Waterloo Indians (21–25). The Galesburg Trotters franchise disbanded on June 25, 1895, and did not return to league play.

In 1908, the Galesburg Hornets were founded and joined the Class D level Illinois-Missouri League. The Canton Chinks, Hannibal Cannibals, Havana Perfectors, Macomb Potters and Monmouth Browns joined Galesburg as charter members in the six–team league. The Galesburg Hornets had four different managers during the season and finished last in the standings with a record of 50–67.

Galesburg remained in the Illinois-Missouri League in 1909, playing as the Galesburg Boosters. The team again finished last in the six–team league with a 47–83 record.

Then known as "Pete" Alexander, Baseball Hall of Fame pitcher Grover Cleveland Alexander pitched and played some outfield for the 1909 Boosters. On July 22, 1909, Alexander threw a no–hitter against the Canton Chinks in a 2–0 Galesburg victory. At age 22, Alexander was 15–8 with a 1.36 ERA and hit .243 in 107 at bats. Alexander was badly injured when he was struck by a throw while baserunning, ending his 1909 season.

In 1910, the Galesburg franchise continued minor league play and switched leagues. The Galesburg Pavers became members of the eight–team Class D level Central Association, replacing the Waterloo Lulus in the league. The 1910 Pavers finished with a record of 69–67 to place fourth in the final standings.

On June 22, 1910, J.W. Schultz threw a no–hitter for Galesburg against the Monmouth Browns in a 2–1 victory.

The "Pavers" moniker was in reference to local industry. In the era, the Galesburg area was home to numerous brickyards, including the Purington Brickyards.

In 1911, the Galesburg Pavers continued Central Association play. The Pavers finished the season with a record of 66–63 and placed third in the Central Association final standings.

The Pavers finished the 1912 in Central Association season in sixth place with a record of 61–67. On July 14, 1912, Galesburg had a third no–hitter when John Beach of Galesburg pitched a no–hitter against the Muscatine Wallopers in a 1–0 Galesburg victory. The Galesburg Pavers franchise folded after the 1912 season, along with the Hannibal Cannibals. Galesburg drew 18,000 fans for the 1912 season, an average of 281 per game.

In 1912, Baseball Hall of Fame inductee Sam Rice began the season with the Galesburg Pavers, playing in exhibition games. However, Rice left the team when his wife, two children, both of his parents and two sisters were killed in a tornado on April 21, 1912.

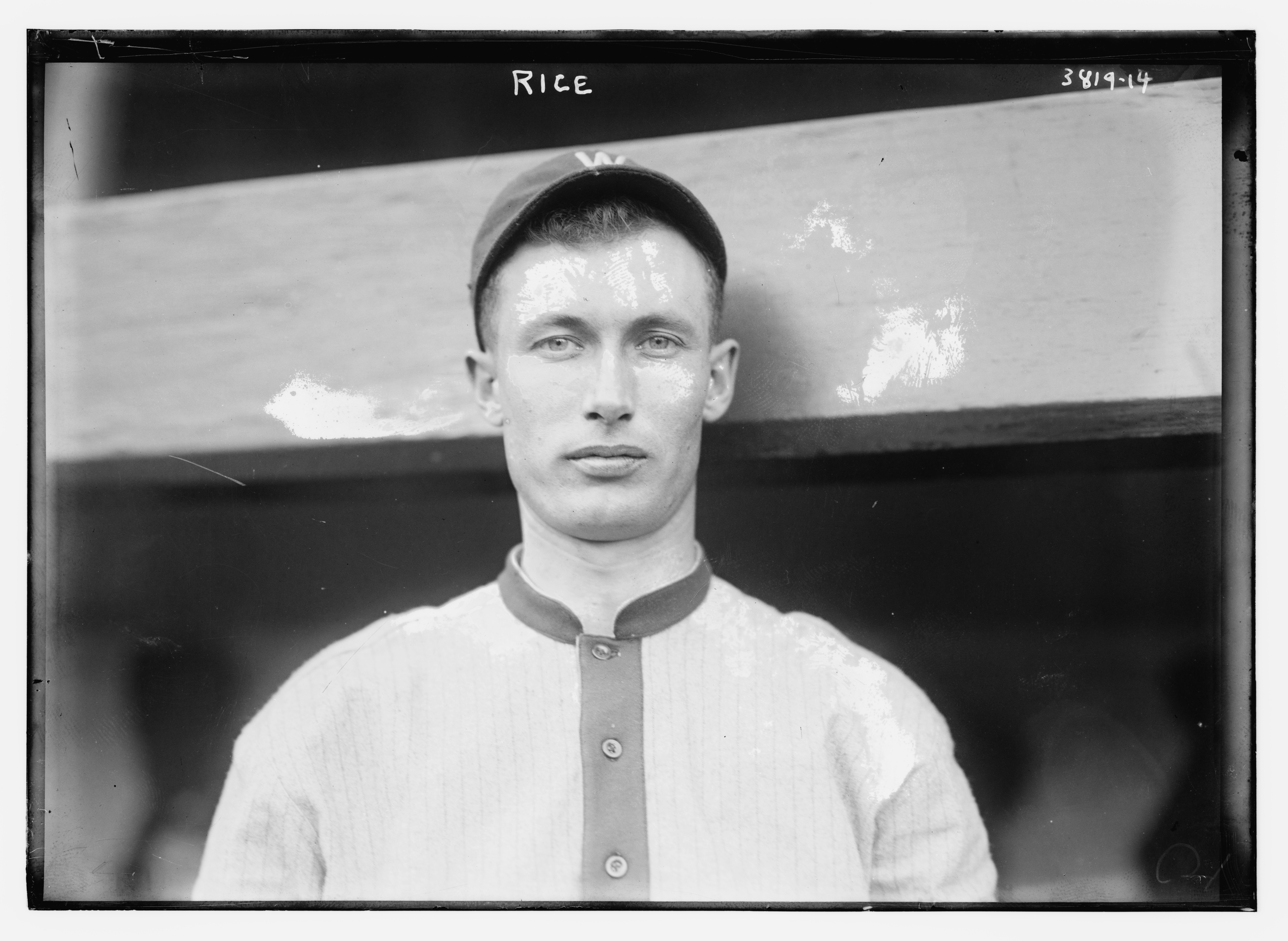
Sam Rice, Washington AL 1916. Rice played with the Galesburg Pavers in 1912, but left the team when his family was killed in a tornado in April, 1912.

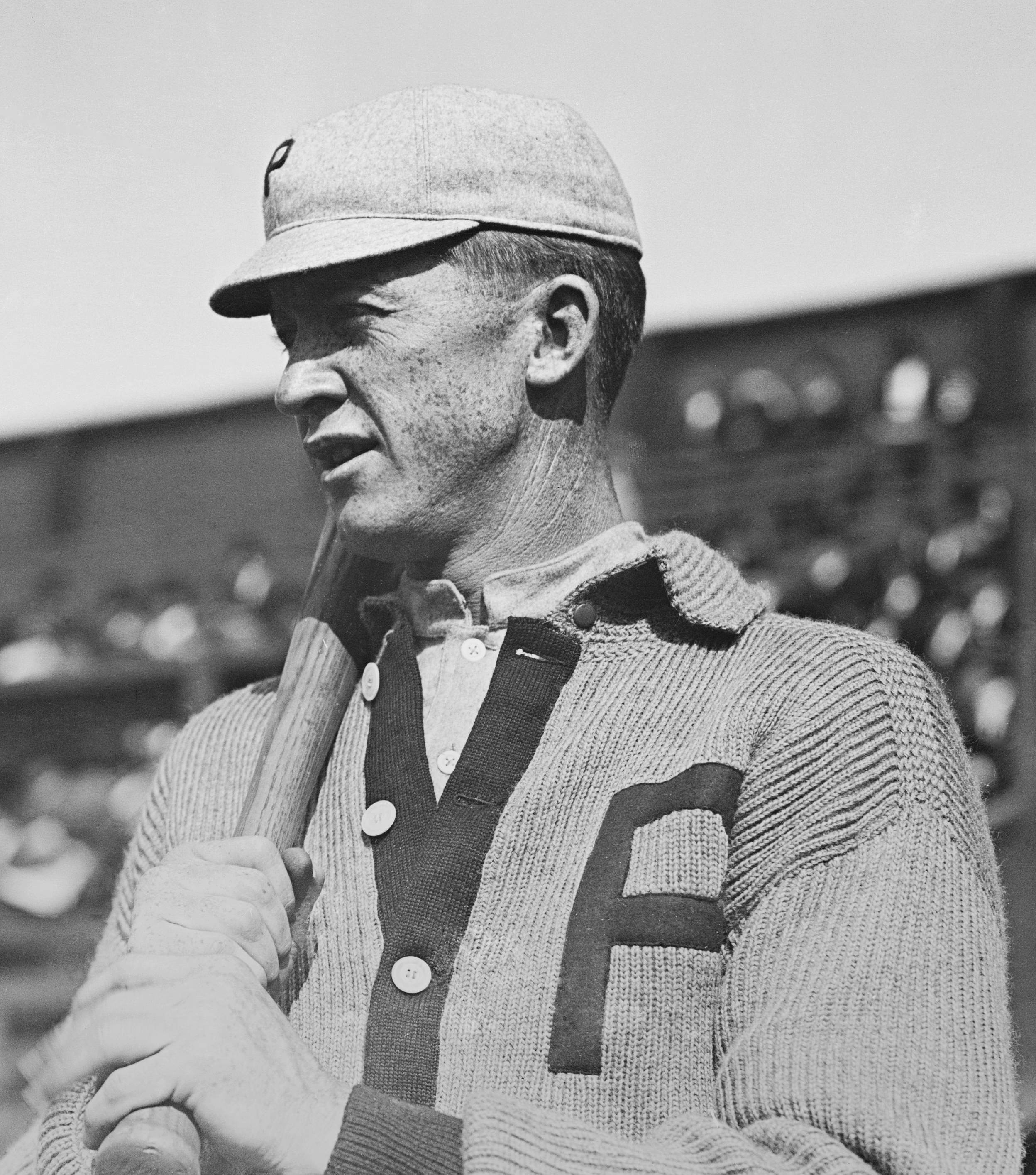
Grover Cleveland Alexander

The Central League administrators met at the conclusion of the 1912 season. It was decided that both the Galesburg and Hannibal teams would be folded. Galesburg was awarded $500 for its players. Galesburg then made a failed attempt to join the 1913 Three-I League.

The Galesburg Pavers made a brief return to the Central Association in 1914. On July 17, 1914, Central Association member Ottumwa Packers moved to Rock Island, Illinois and began play as the Rock Island Islanders. However, on July 24, 1914, after a few games in Rock Island, the franchise was forced to move to Galesburg to play the remainder of the season after losing a territorial dispute with the Three-I League, which had teams nearby the Davenport Blue Sox and Moline Plowboys as members. After finishing the 1914 season in eighth place at 49–79, the Galesburg franchise did not return to the 1915 Central Association.

After the 1914 season, Galesburg, Illinois has not hosted another minor league team.

== The ballparks ==
The pre-20th century Galesburg teams played minor league home games at Willard Field. Willard Field was located on the campus of Knox College in Galesburg. On April 1, 1907, the Chicago White Sox played an exhibition game against Knox College at Willard Field.

The 1908 to 1914 era Galesburg teams hosted home minor league games at Illinois Field. The ballpark was on Monmouth Boulevard, located near the former Admiral Plant, Galesburg, Illinois.

Galesburg teams played some games at the baseball facilities on the campus of Lombard College. The site today is home to Lombard Junior High School, 1220 East Knox St, Galesburg, Illinois.

== Timeline ==
Year(s)	# Yrs.	Team	Level	League	Ballpark
1890 (1)	1	Galesburg	Independent	Central Interstate League	Willard Field
1890 (2)	1	Galesburg	Independent	Illinois-Iowa League	Willard Field
1895	1	Galesburg Trotters	Independent	Eastern Iowa League	Willard Field
1908	1	Galesburg Hornets	Class D	Illinois-Missouri League	Illinois Field
1909	1	Galesburg Boosters	Class D	Illinois-Missouri League	Illinois Field
1910–1912, 1914	4	Galesburg Pavers	Class D	Central Association	Illinois Field

== Notable alumni ==
- Grover Cleveland Alexander (1909) Inducted Baseball Hall of Fame, 1938
- Bud Fowler (1890) Inducted Baseball Hall of Fame, 2022
- Sam Rice (1912) InductedBaseball Hall of Fame, 1963
- Dan Adams (1912)
- Varney Anderson (1890)
- Charlie Bohn (1890)
- Ray Boyd (1908)
- William Burke (1890)
- Fritz Clausen (1890)
- Mutz Ens (1911)
- George Huff (1895)
- Ed Kinsella (1914)
- Fred Kommers (1910)
- Lefty Lorenzen (1914)
- Con Lucid (1890)
- Mike Pendergast (1909)
- Icicle Reeder (1890)
- George Mogridge (1911)
- Eddie Mulligan (1914) King of Baseball Award (1967)
- Ray Rolling (1909)
- Harry Sage (1895, MGR)
- Art Schwind (1912)
- Frank Shugart (1890)
- Cy Slapnicka (1908) Cleveland Guardians Hall of Fame
- John Slagle (1890)
- Len Stockwell (1895)
- Austin Walsh (1911)
- Bill Wilson (1908)
- Polly Wolfe (1911)

== See also ==
Galesburg (minor league baseball) players
Galesburg Boosters players
Galesburg Hornets players
Galesburg Pavers players
