= Ottumwa Packers =

- 1890–1928; (1890–1891, 1895, 1898–1899, 1904–1914, 1916, 1922–1928); Ottumwa, Iowa

Minor league affiliations
- Class: Independent (1890–1891, 1895); Class B (1898–1899); Class D (1904–1914, 1916, 1922–1928)
- League: Illinois-Iowa League (1890–1891); Eastern Iowa League (1895); Western Association (1898–1899); Iowa State League (1904–1907); Central Association (1908–1912, 1913–1914, 1916); Mississippi Valley League (1922–1928)

Major league affiliations
- Team: None

Minor league titles
- League titles (7): 1890; 1904; 1905; 1911; 1912; 1913; 1926

Team data
- Name: Ottumwa Coal Palaces,(1890–1891); Ottumwa Brownies (1895); Ottumwa Giants (1898–1899); Ottumwa Snappers (1904–1905); Ottumwa Champs (1906); Ottumwa Packers (1907–1910); Ottumwa Speedboys (1911–1912); Ottumwa Packers (1913–1914, 1916); Ottumwa Cardinals (1922–1925); Ottumwa Packers (1926–1928)
- Ballpark: Green Street Park (1890–1891, 1895, 1898–1899); Riverside Park (1904–1914, 1916, 1922–1928)

The Ottumwa Packers was the primary name of the minor league baseball teams that played between 1890 and 1928, based in Ottumwa, Iowa. Ottumwa teams played as members of the Illinois-Iowa League (1890–1891), Eastern Iowa League (1895), Western Association (1898–1899), Iowa State League (1904–1907), Central Association (1908–1912, 1913–1914, 1916) and Mississippi Valley League (1922–1928), winning seven league championships.

Baseball Hall of Fame member Burleigh Grimes played for the 1913 Ottumwa Packers.

== History ==
=== History of the nickname ===
Ottumwa was host to multiple minor league teams using a few different names, with the first known squad appearing in 1890 and the last playing in 1928. The Packers nickname, which first appeared in 1907, was the most commonly used.

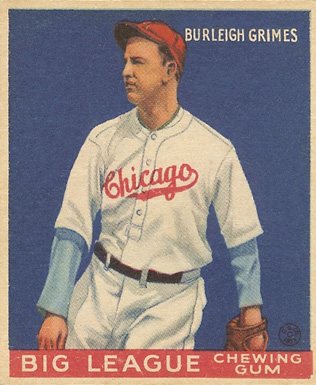
Burleigh Grimes, Goudey card

It was initially used through the 1910 season, when the team changed its name to the Speedboys for 1911 and 1912. It resumed use of the Packers nickname in 1913, using it until the team moved to Rock Island, Illinois to become the Rock Island Islanders partway through the 1914 season.

1915 was the first season since 1900 that Ottumwa did not field a professional team and the first since 1912 that a team called the Packers did not play. However, in the middle of the 1916 season, the Burlington Pathfinders moved to Ottumwa, and the Packers name was once again put into use. The team did not last long, folding following the season.

Minor league baseball returned to Ottumwa in 1922, with the Packers nickname returning in 1926. It was used through 1928, when the last professional team to date was fielded in the city.

=== League championships ===
The Ottumwa Coal Palaces won the Illinois-Iowa League championship in 1890 under Manager Stancliffe. Ottumwa ended the season with a record of 63–43 in the eight–team league, finishing 4.5 games ahead of the 2nd place Monmouth Maple Cities.

The Ottumwa Snappers won back-to-back Iowa State League Championships in 1904 and 1905, both under namesake manager Snapper Kennedy. Ottumwa ended the season with a 70–36 record in 1904, finishing 6.5 games ahead of the 2nd place Waterloo Microbes. In 1905, the Snappers ended the season with a 74–45 record, finishing 2.5 games ahead of the 2nd place Fort Dodge Gypsumites in the eight–team league.

In 1911 and 1912, the Ottumwa Speedboys won back-to-back Central Association Championships, both under Manager Ned Egan, who led the team to a third consecutive championship in 1913, when they played at the Ottumwa Packers. The Speedboys ended the season with a record of 87–41 in 1911, finishing 4.5 games ahead of the 2nd place Burlington Pathfinders. Ottumwa repeated as champions in 1912, compiling a record of 79–50, finishing 3.0 games ahead of the Kewanee Boilermakers.

The Ottumwa Packers won the 1913 championship, their third consecutive Central Association Championship under manager Ned Egan. Baseball Hall of Fame inductee Burleigh Grimes pitched for the 1913 Packers, where he had a 6–2 record with a 1.93 ERA at age 19. The 1926 Packers won the Mississippi Valley League Championship under manager Pat Harkins. In neither year was a league championship series played, however the Packers finished in first both seasons, making them champions.

== The ballparks ==
From 1890 to 1899, Ottumwa teams played minor league home games at Green Street Park. Green Street Park was located at Myrtle Street & Green Street, Ottumwa, Iowa.

Beginning in 1904, Ottumwa teams played at home games at Riverside Park. The ballpark was located on South Wapello Street in the park district.

== Notable alumni ==
- Burleigh Grimes (1913), inducted Baseball Hall of Fame, 1964
- Dan Adams (1913)
- Jim Adams (1891)
- Hal Anderson (1924)
- Varney Anderson (1890)
- Grover Baichley (1916)
- Kirtley Baker (1891)
- Harry Berte (1898)
- Babe Borton (1910)
- Ray Boyd (1910–1911)
- George Burns (1913)
- Hick Cady (1908)
- John Callahan (1899)
- Boileryard Clarke (1890)
- Davey Crockett (1898)
- Fred Curtis (1905)
- Bill Doran (1923, 1925)
- Tim Flood (1898)
- Pop Dillon (1895)
- Tom Drohan (1914)
- Billy Earle (1908)
- Pat Flaherty (1899)
- Ed Gagnier (1905–1906)
- Lou Garland (1925)
- Emil Geiss (1895)
- Frank Gregory (1912–1913, 1916, 1922)
- Jim Hackett (1898)
- Irv Hach (1899)
- Mickey Heath (1923–1924)
- Jesse Hoffmeister (1905–1906)
- George Huff (1895)
- Charlie Jaeger (1910)
- Jimmy Johnston (1910)
- Lou Johnson (1891)
- Bumpus Jones (1891)
- Frank Jude (1922)
- Snapper Kennedy (1904–1905, MGR))
- Maury Kent (1910)
- Ed Kinsella (1914)
- Elmer Klumpp (1927–1928)
- Steve Ladew (1890–1891)
- Lefty Lorenzen (1913–1914)
- Wally Mattick (1923–1925, MGR)
- Harry Maupin (1905)
- Mart McQuaid ((1899)
- Walt Meinert (1916)
- Wally Millies (1928)
- Gene Moore (1928)
- Eddie Mulligan (1914)
- Win Noyes (1911)
- John O'Connell (1898)
- Chick Pedroes (1895)
- Robert Pender (1898)
- Lee Riley (1927)
- Joe Sargent (1916)
- Jack Saltzgaver (1925, 1928)
- Roy Schalk (1928)
- Dutch Schliebner (1913)
- Ossee Schrecongost (1898)
- Hank Severeid (1910)
- Camp Skinner (1928)
- Bill Speas (1928, MGR)
- Ed Spurney (1891)
- Tom Stanton (1899)
- Harry Taylor (1928)
- Fay Thomas (1925)
- Walt Thomas (1910)
- Art Twineham (1890)
- Austin Walsh (1914)
- Buck Washer (1908)
- Jake Weimer (1898–1899)
- Johnny Welch (1925)
- Cy Wright (1916)
- Zeke Wrigley (1910)
- Henry Yaik (1895)
- George Zackert (1908)
- Bill Zies (1891)

== See also ==
- Ottumwa (minor league baseball) players
- Ottumwa Cardinals players
- Ottumwa Champs players
- Ottumwa Coal Palaces players
- Ottumwa Giants players
- Ottumwa Packers players
- Ottumwa Snappers players
- Ottumwa Speedboys players
