= Illinois–Iowa League =

- Formerly: Illinois-Indiana League
- Classification: Independent (1890–1892)
- Sport: Minor League Baseball
- First season: 1890
- Folded: 1892
- President: Sanger Steel (1890–1891); W.W. Kent (1892)
- No. of teams: 18
- Country: United States of America
- Most titles: 1 Ottumwa Coal Palace Kings (1890); Quincy Ravens (1891); Joliet Convicts (1892)
- Related competitions: Illinois-Indiana-Iowa League

The Illinois–Iowa League was a Minor league baseball league which operated in Illinois, Iowa and Indiana from 1890 to 1892.

== History ==
The Illinois–Iowa League began play in 1890 and was nicknamed as the "Two I League". The Aurora Hoodoos, Cedar Rapids Canaries, Dubuque Giants, Joliet Convicts, Monmouth Maple Cities, Ottawa Pirates, Ottumwa Coal Palaces and Sterling Blue Coats began play on May 1, 1890, as charter members.

The Ottumwa Coal Palace Kings(1890), Quincy Ravens (1891) and Joliet Convicts (1892) were the league champions.

== Cities represented ==
- Aurora, IL: Aurora Hoodoos 1890; Aurora Maroons 1891; Aurora Indians 1892
- Burlington, IA: Burlington Hawkeyes 1890
- Cedar Rapids, IA: Cedar Rapids Canaries 1890–1891
- Davenport, IA: Davenport Pilgrims 1891
- Dubuque, IA: Dubuque Giants 1890
- Evansville, IN: Evansville Hoosiers 1892
- Galesburg, IL: Galesburg 1890
- Jacksonville, IL: Jacksonville Lunatics 1892
- Joliet, IL: Joliet Convicts 1890; Joliet Giants 1891; Joliet Convicts 1892
- Monmouth, IL: Monmouth Maple Cities 1890
- Ottawa, IL: Ottawa Pirates 1890; Ottawa Modocs 1891
- Ottumwa, IA: Ottumwa Coal Palaces 1890–1891
- Peoria, IL: Peoria Distillers 1892
- Quincy, IL: Quincy Ravens 1891–1892
- Rock Island, IL/Moline, IL: Rock Island-Moline Twins 1892
- Rockford, IL: Rockford Hustlers 1891–1892
- Sterling, IL: Sterling Blue Coats 1890
- Terre Haute, IN: Terre Haute Hottentots 1892

== Standings and statistics ==
1890 Illinois–Iowa League

Team standings	W	L	PCT	GB	Managers
Ottumwa Coal Palace Kings	68	43	.613	–	Stancliff
Monmouth Maple Cities	64	48	.571	4½	John Halpin
Cedar Rapids Canaries	62	49	.559	6	James Plumb
Ottawa Pirates	58	50	.537	8½	Joe Hillery / William Sinon; Bert Merrifield
Aurora Hoodoos	52	54	.491	13½	Tim Manning
Joliet Convicts	56	59	.487	14	Ed Culbertson / John E. Buckley
Dubuque Giants	53	59	.473	15½	William McCaull / William Lapham
Sterling Blue Coats / Galesburg; Burlington Hawkeyes	30	72	.294	33½	James Donnelly / Charles Wirsche / Al Weddige / Clarence Hoyt / Varney Anderson

Sterling (21–51) moved to Galesburg July 31; Galesburg (8–17) moved to Burlington September 4; Burlington disbanded September 10.

Player statistics
Player	Team	Stat	Tot
Tim Manning	Aurora	BA	.328

1891 Illinois–Iowa League
schedule

Team standings	W	L	PCT	GB	Managers
Quincy Ravens	65	35	.650	–	Billy Murray
Joliet Giants	62	48	.564	8	Bill Moran / Tim Manning
Rockford Hustlers	54	46	.540	11	Hugh Nicol
Ottawa Modocs	53	49	.520	13	Jack Remsen
Ottumwa Coal Palaces	43	52	.453	NA	Fred Orelup
Cedar Rapids Canaries	39	55	.415	NA	James Plumb / John Godar
Davenport Pilgrims	23	38	.377	NA	Kerken / John Crogan
Aurora Maroons	11	27	.289	NA	Harry Smith / Ed Wiswell / Tim Manning

Aurora disbanded June 17.
Davenport disbanded July 22.
Ottumwa and Cedar Rapids disbanded September 2.

Player statistics
Player	Team	Stat	Tot	Player	Team	Stat	Tot
William Dale	Rockford	BA	.345	Peter Daniels	Quincy	W	29
Connie Murphy	Quincy	Runs	97	Harry Burrell	Joliet	SO	195
George Decker	Joliet	Hits	118	Peter Daniels	Quincy	PCT	.744 29–10
Connie Murphy	Quincy	SB	73				

1892 Illinois–Iowa League
schedule

Team Standings	W	L	PCT	GB	Managers
Joliet Convicts	55	27	.671	–	Billy Murray
Rockford Hustlers	46	38	.549	10	Hugh Nicol
Rock Island-Moline Twins	37	42	.468	16½	Harry Sage
Jacksonville Lunatics	30	57	.345	27½	Jack Pettiford / Guy Hecker
Evansville Hoosiers	30	20	.600	NA	Albert Schellhase / Jack Wentz
Peoria Distillers / Aurora Indians	26	27	.491	NA	Mike Trost
Terre Haute Hottentots	25	27	.481	NA	George Brackett / Charles Flynn
Quincy Ravens	12	23	.343	NA	Bill Whitrock / John Godar / Samuel Levesque

Peoria (17–8) moved to Aurora May 31; Aurora disbanded July 5; Quincy disbanded June 24; Evansville disbanded July 8; Terre Haute disbanded July 10.

Player statistics
Player	Team	Stat	Tot	Player	Team	Stat	Tot
Fred Underwood	Rockford	BA	.282	Bumpus Jones	Joliet	W	24
Ed Wiswell	Rockford	Runs	77	George Nicol	Rockford	SO	230
Gene Moriarty	Evansville/Jacksonville	Hits	91	Ernest Beam	Terre Haute	ERA	0.91
Gene Moriarty	Evansville/Jacksonville	HR	13	Bumpus Jones	Joliet	PCT	.857 24–4
