= Eastern Iowa League =

- Classification: Independent (1895)
- Sport: Minor League Baseball
- First season: 1890
- Folded: 1895
- President: Unknown (1890, 1895)
- No. of teams: 8
- Country: United States of America
- Most titles: 1 Dubuque Colts (1895)
- Related competitions: Illinois–Iowa League

The Eastern Iowa League was a minor league baseball league that played in the 1890 and 1895 seasons. The eight–team Independent level Eastern Iowa League consisted of teams based in Iowa and Illinois. The Eastern Iowa League permanently folded following the 1895 season.

== History ==
The Eastern Iowa League was formed for the 1895 season as an Independent level minor league. A league with the same name had operated in 1890 and the teams and statistics of the 1890 league are unknown. The Eastern Iowa League League began play on May 10, 1895, as an eight–team league. The Eastern Iowa League League hosted Iowa franchises from Burlington, Iowa (Burlington Spiders), Cedar Rapids, Iowa (Cedar Rapids Rabbits), Clinton, Iowa (Clinton Bridegrooms), Dubuque, Iowa (Dubuque Colts), Ottumwa, Iowa (Ottumwa Brownies) and Waterloo, Iowa (Waterloo Indians). The Illinois franchises were based in Rock Island, Illinois (Rock Island Tri-Cities) and Galesburg, Illinois (Galesburg Trotters).

After the season began in 1895, two franchises were "expelled" from the league. On June 14, 1895, both the Clinton Bridegrooms and the Rock Island Tri-Cities were expelled from the Eastern Iowa League.

Cedar Rapids turned a triple play in a 6–2 victory over Dubuque on June 18, 1895.

The Galesburg Trotters franchise disbanded on June 25, 1895, and did not return to league play.

After being expelled from the league, the Clinton Bridegrooms were allowed to rejoin the Eastern Iowa League, returning to league play on July 4, 1895.

On July 8, 1895, four days after being reinstated, the Clinton Bridegrooms were expelled from the league for a second time. The Waterloo Indians were also expelled from the Eastern Iowa League on July 8, 1895.

The Dubuque Colts franchise explored joining the Western Association in 1895 and one of the Dubuque directors of the Dubuque club wrote a letter to the Cedar Rapids franchise in an attempt to have Cedar Rapids join them in the move. The teams did not leave the 1895 Eastern Iowa League.

Local businesses regularly closed when Eastern Iowa League teams hosted home games.

The Dubuque Colts (66–31) had the best overall record in the Eastern Iowa League, which ended the season with four teams. Dubuque won the Eastern Iowa League Championship by winning both halves, so no playoffs were held. The rest of the Eastern Iowa League 1895 regular season records were: Burlington Spiders (52–39), Ottumwa Brownies (49–52), Cedar Rapids Rabbits (43–51). The four teams who were didn't finish the season were the Waterloo Indians, who stopped play with a 21–25 record, the Rock Island Tri-Cities (14–18), Galesburg Trotters (13–27) and Clinton Bridegrooms (11–26).

The Eastern Iowa League permanently disbanded after the 1895 season was completed.

== Eastern Iowa League teams: 1895 ==
Team name	City represented	Ballpark	Year
Burlington Hawkeyes (Burlington Spiders)	Burlington, Iowa	Athletic Park	1895
Cedar Rapids Rabbits	Cedar Rapids, Iowa	West End Grounds	1895
Clinton Bridegrooms	Clinton, Iowa	Ringwood Park	1895
Dubuque Colts	Dubuque, Iowa	26th Street Field, Base Ball Grounds	1895
Galesburg Trotters	Galesburg, Illinois	Willard Field	1895
Ottumwa Brownies	Ottumwa, Iowa	Green Street Park	1895
Rock Island Tri-Cities	Rock Island, Illinois	12th Street Grounds, Twin City Park	1895
Waterloo Indians	Waterloo, Iowa	West End Grounds	1895

== Standings & statistics ==
1895 Eastern Iowa League

Team standings	W	L	PCT	GB	Managers
Dubuque Colts	66	31	.680	–	Joe Cantillon / Tom Morrissey
Burlington Hawkeyes	52	39	.571	11	Paul Hines
Ottumwa Brownies	49	52	.485	19	Fred Orelup
Cedar Rapids Rabbits	43	51	.457	21½	John Buchan / Pa Rourke
Waterloo Indians	21	25	.457	NA	Mike Lawrence / Baker
Galesburg Trotters	13	27	.325	NA	Frank DuShane
Rock Island Tri-Cities	14	18	.438	NA	Harry Sage
Clinton Bridegrooms	11	26	.297	NA	George Shugart / Edward Corbett

Player statistics
Player	Team	Stat	Tot	Player	Team	Stat	Tot
Tom Morrissey	Dubuque	BA	.404	Jake Weimer	Burlington	W	18
Leroy Hackett	Burlington	Runs	97	Jake Weimer	Burlington	SO	148
Tom Morrissey	Dubuque	Hits	137	Pop Dillon	Ottumwa	PCT	.714 10–4
Leroy Hackett	Burlington	HR	13				
