= Rock Island Islanders =

- 1892–1937; (1892, 1894–1895, 1898–1899, 1901–1911, 1916–1917, 1920–1932, 1934–1937); Rock Island, Illinois

Minor league affiliations
- Previous classes: Independent (1892); Class A (1894); Independent (1895, 1898–1899); Class D (1901); Class B (1901–1911, 1916–1917, 1920–1921); Class D (1922–1932); Class B (1933); Class A (1934–1937)
- Previous leagues: Illinois–Iowa League (1892); Western Association (1894); Eastern Iowa League (1895); Western Association (1898–1899); Illinois–Indiana–Iowa League (Three-I League) (1901–1911); Central Association (1914); Illinois–Indiana–Iowa League (1916–1917, 1920–1921); Mississippi Valley League (1922–1933); Western League (1934–1937)

Major league affiliations
- Previous teams: Cincinnati Reds (1933); St. Louis Browns (1932)

Minor league titles
- League titles: 5 1894, 1899, 1907, 1909, 1932

Team data
- Previous names: Rock Island Islanders (1898–1899, 1901–1911, 1916–1917, 1920–1932, 1934–1937); Rock Island Tri-Cities (1895); Rock Island-Moline Islanders (1894); Rock Island-Moline Twins (1892)
- Previous parks: 12th Street Grounds (1892, 1894–1895, 1898–1899, 1902–1911, 1916–1917); Douglas Park (1920–1932, 1934–1937)

The Rock Island Islanders was the primary name of the minor league baseball teams based in Rock Island, Illinois, one of the Quad Cities, between 1892 and 1937. Rock Island teams played as members of the Illinois–Iowa League (1892), Western Association (1894), Eastern Iowa League (1895), Western Association (1898–1899), Illinois–Indiana–Iowa League (Three-I League) (1901–1911), Central Association (1914), Illinois–Indiana–Iowa League (1916–1917, 1920–1921), Mississippi Valley League (1922–1933) and Western League (1934–1937).

The Rock Island Islanders were affiliates of the St. Louis Browns in 1932 and Cincinnati Reds in 1933.

Beginning in 1920, Rock Island played home games at Douglas Park, sharing the field with the Rock Island Independents, a charter National Football League franchise.

== History ==
Beginning in 1879, Quad City professional baseball history includes minor League teams based in Davenport, Iowa, Moline, Illinois, Rock Island, Illinois and nearby Kewanee, Illinois. The 1879 Davenport Brown Stockings began minor league play as members of the Northwestern League. Rock Island first fielded a team in the 1894 Western Association and other Rock Island teams played as members of the Western Association 1899), Eastern Iowa League (1895) and Illinois–Iowa League (1892). Rock Island first played 1883 as an Independent League team. The 1892 Rock Island-Moline Twins played in the final season of the Illinois-Iowa League, which folded after the season. In 1894, Rock Island played in the Western Association as the Rock Island-Moline Islanders. Rock Island captured the 1894 Western Association Championship with a record of 72–50. In 1901, the "Rock Island Islanders" began play as charter members of the Illinois–Indiana–Iowa League, along with the Bloomington Blues, Cedar Rapids Rabbits, Davenport River Rats, Decatur Commodores, Evansville River Rats, Rockford Red Sox and Terre Haute Hottentots. Rock Island played in the league until 1921.

The Rock Island Tri-Cities played in the only season of the Eastern Iowa League in 1895, but were expelled from the league on June 14, 1895 (along with the Clinton Bridegrooms) with a 14–18 record. In 1898, playing in the Western Association, the Islanders disbanded after two other teams had already disbanded that season, causing the Western Association to disband on June 26, 1998. In 1899, the Islanders were in first place (28–8), when the Western Association disbanded on June 16, 1899. All the early Rock Island teams were managed by Rock Island native Harry Sage.

The Rock Island Islanders won two Illinois-Indiana-Iowa League Championships in an era without playoffs, finishing 84–47 in 1907 and 90–48 in 1909. Both teams were managed by Jack Tighe.

After the Islanders finished last, with a record of 58–79, in the 1911 Illinois-Indiana-Iowa League. Rock Island was replaced by the Springfield Senators in the 1912 Illinois-Indiana-Iowa League.

With the Rock Island and Davenport hosting teams in this era, in 1914 a third Quad City minor league team was added. The 1914 Moline Plowboys joined the Illinois-Indiana-Iowa League. Moline claimed league championships in 1915, 1921 and 1937. A fourth area minor league team, the nearby Kewanee Boilermakers were members of the Central Association from 1908 to 1913 and 1948 to 1949.

The Rock Island Islanders briefly regained a franchise in 1914, when the Central Association member Ottumwa Packers moved to Rock Island on July 17, 1914. However, on July 24, 1914, after a few games in Rock Island, the franchise was forced to play the remainder of the season in Galesburg, Illinois after the Illinois-Indiana-Iowa League ruled against having a league team placed in the territory of the Moline Plowboys. The team played as the Galesburg Pavers in their remaining 1914 games. Galesburg did not return to play in 1915.

In 1916, the Rock Island Islanders rejoined the Illinois-Indiana-Iowa League, playing alongside the Moline Plowboys and Davenport Blue Sox. Rock Island was in fourth place (36–25) when the Three-I League halted play on July 8, 1917. The league did not return in 1918, with the nation invested in World War I, but resumed in 1919 without Rock Island. The Islanders rejoined the league in 1920 and 1921, finishing in last place in both seasons. Overall, the Islanders played in the Illinois-Indiana-Iowa League from 1901 to 1911, 1916 to 1917 and 1920 to 1921.

Rock Island joined the 1922 Mississippi Valley League as a charter member, joining the league along with the Cedar Rapids Bunnies, Dubuque Climbers, Marshalltown Ansons, Ottumwa Cardinals and Waterloo Hawks teams. The Mississippi Valley League was founded by Rock Island native Michael H. Sexton. Sexton was then president of the National Association of Professional Baseball Leagues, after having served as president of the Illinois-Indiana-Iowa League. The Rock Island Islanders remained as members of the Mississippi Valley for the league's entire existence from 1922 to 1933. The Moline Plowboys joined the Mississippi Valley League in 1923 and the Davenport Blue Sox in 1928.

In 1922, the Islanders were managed by Pro Football Hall of Fame member Jimmy Conzelman, who also played for the 1922 team. Conzelman was a player on the Rock Island Independents pro football team, which also played at Browning Field.

The Rock Island Islanders and Davenport Blue Sox faced each other in the Mississippi Valley League Championship series in 1932 and 1933. Rock Island won the 1932 Championship, defeating Davenport in six games. Davenport defeated the Islanders to win the 1933 Championship in the final season of the Mississippi Valley League.

After joining the Western League in 1934, On July 17, 1935, the Islanders had a record of 19–46 in the Western League standings when the franchise folded . In 1936, the Omaha Robin Hoods of the Western League moved to Rock Island on August 18, 1936 after their ballpark was destroyed by fire. The franchise was known as the "Rock Island Islanders" for the remainder of the 1936 season.

The Rock Island Islanders played their final season in 1937, as both Rock Island and the Davenport Blue Sox teams were both members of the Western League in 1937. The Rock Island Islanders franchise folded permanently on July 7, 1937. The Western League itself then folded after the season.

Rock Island captured league championships in 1894, 1899, 1907, 1909 and 1932.

Rock Island has not hosted another minor league team. Today, the Quad Cities is represented in minor league baseball by the Quad City River Bandits, based in neighboring Davenport, Iowa, with the franchise beginning Midwest League play in 1960.

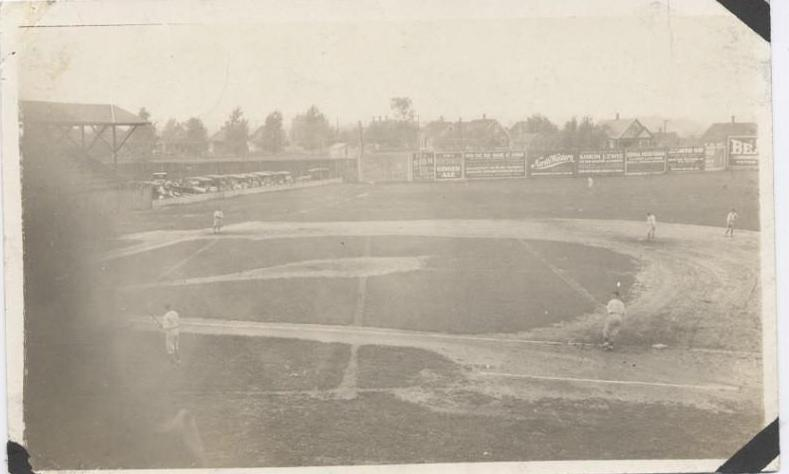
Rock Island Islanders at Douglas Park, 1920

== The ballparks ==
Rock Island teams, until 1917, played home minor league games at the 12th Street Grounds. The ballpark was located on the North end of 12th street, near the railroad tracks in Rock Island, Illinois.

Beginning in 1920, the Islanders hosted minor league home games at Douglas Park. The historic park and ballfield are still in use today.The Quad City 76ers Semi-Pro team is the primary tenant. Notably, Douglas Park also was the site of the first National Football League game on September 26, 1920, hosted by the Rock Island Independents. Douglas Park is located at 18th Avenue & 10th Street, Rock Island, Illinois, 61201.

== Timeline ==
Year(s)	# Yrs.	Team	Level	League	Affiliate
1892	1	Rock Island-Moline Twins	Independent	Illinois-Iowa League	None
1894	1	Rock Island-Moline Islanders	Class A	Western Association	None
1895	1	Rock Island Tri-Cities	Independent	Eastern Iowa League	None
1898–1899	2	Rock Island Islanders	Independent	Western Association	None
1901	1	Rock Island Islanders	Class D	Illinois–Indiana–Iowa League	None
1902–1911; 1916-1917; 1920-1921	14	Rock Island Islanders	Class B	Illinois–Indiana–Iowa League	None
1922–1931	8	Rock Island Islanders	Class D	Mississippi Valley League	None
1932	1	Rock Island Islanders	Class D	Mississippi Valley League	St. Louis Browns
1933	1	Rock Island Islanders	Class B	Mississippi Valley League	Cincinnati Reds
1934–1937	4	Rock Island Islanders	Class A	Western League	None

== Notable alumni ==
- Varney Anderson (1898)
- Harry Bay (1916) 2x AL Stolen Base Leader
- Julio Bonetti (1934–1935)
- Pat Caraway (1927)
- Charlie Case (1903)
- Pug Cavet (1910)
- Jimmy Conzelman (1922, MGR) Pro Football Hall of Fame
- Como Cotelle (1926)
- Bert Cunningham (1892)
- Ed Cushman (1892)
- Johnny Dickshot (1932, 1934)
- Pop Dillon (1898)
- Red Dooin (1899)
- Tommy Heath (1932)
- Hunter Hill (1902)
- Fred Hofmann (1917)
- Al Hollingsworth (1931–1933)
- Charlie Hollocher (1916) 1918 NL Hits Leader
- Joe Hoover (1937)
- Baby Doll Jacobson (1910–1911)
- Si Johnson (1928)
- Arndt Jorgens (1926)
- Harry Kimberlin (1932)
- Bill Krieg (1894)
- Tacks Latimer (1903)
- Glenn Liebhardt (1904)
- Clarence Mitchell (1936)
- Tim O'Rourke (1899)
- Russ Scarritt (1936)
- Boss Schmidt (1903)
- Al Schweitzer (1921)
- Elmer Stricklett (1899)
- Harry Swacina (1909)
- Bill Sweeney (1904–1905)
- Phil Weintraub (1926)
- Butch Weis (1920)
- Paul Zahniser (1937)

== See also ==
- Rock Island (minor league baseball) players
- Rock Island Islanders players
- Rock Island-Moline Islanders players
- Rock Island-Moline Twins players
