= Ralph Bell =

Ralph Bell may refer to:

- Ralph Bell (baseball)
- Ralph Bell (MP)
- Ralph Bell (actor)
