= Joe Sargent =

American baseball player (1893–1950)

- Infielder
- Born: September 24, 1893; Rochester, New York, U.S.
- Died: July 5, 1950 (aged 56); Rochester, New York, U.S.
- Batted: Right Threw: Right

MLB debut
- April 27, 1921, for the Detroit Tigers

Last MLB appearance
- September 25, 1921, for the Detroit Tigers

MLB statistics
- Batting average: .253
- Home runs: 2
- Runs batted in: 22
- Stats at Baseball Reference

Teams
- Detroit Tigers (1921)

Joseph Alexander Sargent (September 24, 1893 – July 5, 1950), nicknamed "Horse Belly," was an American baseball player. He played professional baseball for nine years from 1916 to 1924, including one season in Major League Baseball as a utility infielder for the Detroit Tigers in 1921. He appeared in 66 games, including 24 as a second baseman, 23 as a third baseman, and 19 as a shortstop. He compiled a .253 batting average, a .388 on-base percentage, scored 21 runs and had 22 RBIs for the 1921 Tigers.

== Early years ==
Sargent was born in Rochester, New York, in 1893.

== Professional baseball ==
Sargent began playing professional baseball in the Central Association with the Marshalltown Ansons and Burlington Pathfinders/Ottumwa Packers in 1916 and with the La Crosse Infants in 1917. In 1918, he advanced to the International League in 1918 playing for the Newark Bears and Jersey City Skeeters. He appeared in his final minor league game before being inducted into the Army on July 21, 1918.

Sargent served in the Army in France in the later stages of World War I. He was injured in a gas attack on Armistice Day.

He returned to baseball in 1919 with the Newark Bears, appearing in 124 games as a shortstop. On July 23, 1919, when the Bears played in Sargent's home town of Rochester, a Joe Sargent Day was held at which friends presented him with a gold watch.

In March 1920, Sargent signed with the Buffalo Bisons of the International League. He appeared in 117 games for Buffalo, 83 of them as a third baseman and compiled a .307 batting average.

In January 1921, the Bisons sold Sargent to the Detroit Tigers. He made his major league debut with the Tigers on April 27, 1921, and appeared in 66 games, 19 as the Tigers' starting second baseman, 14 as the starting third baseman, and 11 as the starting shortstop. He compiled a .253 batting average and a .342 on-base percentage with the Tigers. He appeared in his final major league game on September 25, 1921.

Sargent continued to play in the minor leagues for the Portland Beavers in 1922, the Shreveport Gassers in 1923 and 1924, and the Tulsa Oilers in 1924.

== Later years ==
Sargent was married, and he and his wife, Marie, had a son, Joseph Sargent, Jr. After retiring from professional baseball, Sargent "an outstanding bowler and better than average amateur golfer." He won the New York state bowling championship and once rolled three perfect games in a row. He suffered for much of his life from "blinding head pains" resulting from being gassed on Armistice Day while serving in France during World War I. Sargent died in Rochester, New York, in 1950.
