= Doc Shanley =

American baseball player (1889–1934)

- Shortstop
- Born: January 30, 1889; Granbury, Texas, U.S.
- Died: December 13, 1934 (aged 45); St. Petersburg, Florida, U.S.
- Batted: Right Threw: Right

MLB debut
- September 15, 1912, for the St. Louis Browns

Last MLB appearance
- September 24, 1912, for the St. Louis Browns

MLB statistics
- Games played: 5
- At bats: 8
- Hits: 0
- Stats at Baseball Reference

Teams
- St. Louis Browns (1912)

Harry Root "Doc" Shanley (January 30, 1889 – December 13, 1934) was an American Major League Baseball shortstop. He played for the St. Louis Browns in 1912. In 5 career games, he had no hits in 8 at-bats. He batted and threw right-handed.

Before he joined the Browns in 1912, he spent the season with the D-Class Burlington Pathfinders. After hitting .370 for the season to lead the Central Association, his contract was purchased in late August by the Browns. After the season, he continued playing in the minor leagues until 1924.

Shanley was born in Granbury, Texas and died in St. Petersburg, Florida.
