= Hack Spencer =

American baseball player (1885–1969)

- Pitcher
- Born: April 25, 1885; St. Cloud, Minnesota, U.S.
- Died: February 5, 1969 (aged 83); St. Anthony, Minnesota, U.S.
- Batted: Right Threw: Right

MLB debut
- April 18, 1912, for the St. Louis Browns

Last MLB appearance
- April 18, 1912, for the St. Louis Browns

MLB statistics
- Games: 1
- Win–loss record: 0–0
- Earned run average: 0.00
- Stats at Baseball Reference

Teams
- St. Louis Browns (1911)

Fred Calvin "Hack" Spencer (April 25, 1885 – February 5, 1969) was an American professional baseball player. Spencer played for the St. Louis Browns in the 1912 season. In one career game, he pitched in 1.2 innings and gave up two hits and two runs. He batted and threw right-handed.

On September 12, 1909, Spencer threw a no-hitter, pitching for the Burlington Pathfinders of the Class B level Central Association. Playing at the Waterloo Lulus, Spencer walked 2 and struck out 6 batters in the game.

Spencer was born in St. Cloud, Minnesota, and died in St. Anthony, Minnesota.
