= Tim Manning =

English baseball player (1853–1934)

- Second baseman
- Born: December 3, 1853; Henley-on-Thames, England
- Died: June 11, 1934 (aged 80); Oak Park, Illinois, U.S.
- Batted: Right Threw: Right

MLB debut
- May 1, 1882, for the Providence Grays

Last MLB appearance
- July 20, 1885, for the Providence Grays

MLB statistics
- Games played: 200
- runs scored: 99
- Batting average: .189
- Stats at Baseball Reference

Teams
- Providence Grays (1882); Baltimore Orioles (1883–1885); Providence Grays (1885)

Timothy Edward Manning (December 3, 1853 – June 11, 1934) was an English professional baseball player who played mostly as a second baseman in Major League Baseball from 1882 to 1885. He began his career with the Providence Grays in 1882. After his first season, he then played two full seasons, and one partial season for the Baltimore Orioles, before returning to the Grays in his final season. Manning died at the age of 80 in Oak Park, Illinois, and is interred at the Calvary Cemetery in Evanston, Illinois.
