= Bill Krieg =

American baseball player (1859–1930)

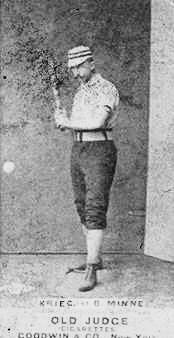
- Catcher / Outfielder / First baseman
- Born: January 29, 1859; Petersburg, Illinois, U.S.
- Died: March 25, 1930 (aged 71); Chillicothe, Illinois, U.S.
- Batted: Right Threw: Right

MLB debut
- April 20, 1884, for the Chicago Browns/Pittsburgh Stogies

Last MLB appearance
- June 15, 1887, for the Washington Nationals

MLB statistics
- Batting average: .237
- Home runs: 4
- Runs batted in: 37
- Stats at Baseball Reference

Teams
- Chicago Browns/Pittsburgh Stogies (1884); Chicago White Stockings (1885); Brooklyn Grays (1885); Washington Nationals (1886–1887)

William Frederick Krieg (January 29, 1859 – March 25. 1930) was an American Major League Baseball player from 1884 to 1887. He won three batting titles in the minor leagues.

== Career ==
Krieg was born in Petersburg, Illinois. He played college baseball at the University of Notre Dame and then started his professional baseball career in 1883, in the Northwestern League. In 1884, Krieg played in the Union Association, which is now considered a "major league." He batted .247. During the following season, he had short stints with four different ballclubs: two minor league teams based in Hartford and the major league Chicago White Stockings and Brooklyn Grays. In 1886, he split time with the Washington Nationals and the Eastern League's Hartford Dark Blues.

Krieg started 1887 with Washington. On opening day, he hit a home run, and in the stands, "hats, umbrellas and canes were thrown into the air and the multitude shouted forth their joy in hilarious manner." However, Krieg batted just .253 in 25 games and was released in midseason. He played his final major league game on June 15. Afterwards, he joined the Northwestern League's Minneapolis Millers and batted .402, which was the second-best total in the circuit.

Krieg played in the Western Association in 1888 and would remain in that league for most of the following decade. In 1889, he batted .326 and then joined Milwaukee in 1890. In 1892, he won his first batting title while playing in Milwaukee. Krieg had a career season with Rockford in 1895. During that campaign, he batted a robust .452, with 237 hits, 14 triples, and 11 home runs to lead the Western Association in all four categories. He won another batting title the following year, at .350. In 1897, he hit .340. In 1898, he became the player-manager for the Burlington Hawkeyes, but his batting average slipped to .297. In 1899, he was player-manager for the Bloomington Blues.

Krieg's playing career ended in 1901, when he was 42 years old. The following season, he managed in the Southern Association and then retired from the game. Early in his career, he had been a catcher, outfielder, and first baseman – he played the majority of his MLB games as a catcher – but he ended up being primarily a first baseman later in his career. Krieg's lifetime minor league batting average was .335, and Bill James considered him to be the best minor league baseball player of the 1880s. By 1905 Krieg was living in Chillicothe, Illinois, where he died in 1930, at the age of 71.
