= John Godar =

American baseball player (1864–1949)

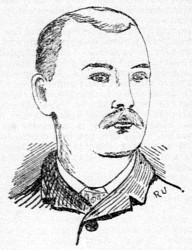
- Right fielder
- Born: October 25, 1864; Cincinnati, Ohio, U.S.
- Died: June 23, 1949 (aged 84); Park Ridge, Illinois, U.S.
- Batted: Right Threw: Right

MLB debut
- July 8, 1892, for the Baltimore Orioles

Last MLB appearance
- July 11, 1892, for the Baltimore Orioles

MLB statistics
- Games played: 5
- Batting average: .214
- Runs scored: 2
- Stats at Baseball Reference

Teams
- Baltimore Orioles (1892)

John Michael Godar (October 25, 1864 – June 23, 1949) was an American professional baseball player who played as an outfielder in the Major Leagues for the 1892 Baltimore Orioles.
