= Ralph Bell (baseball) =

American baseball player (1890–1959)

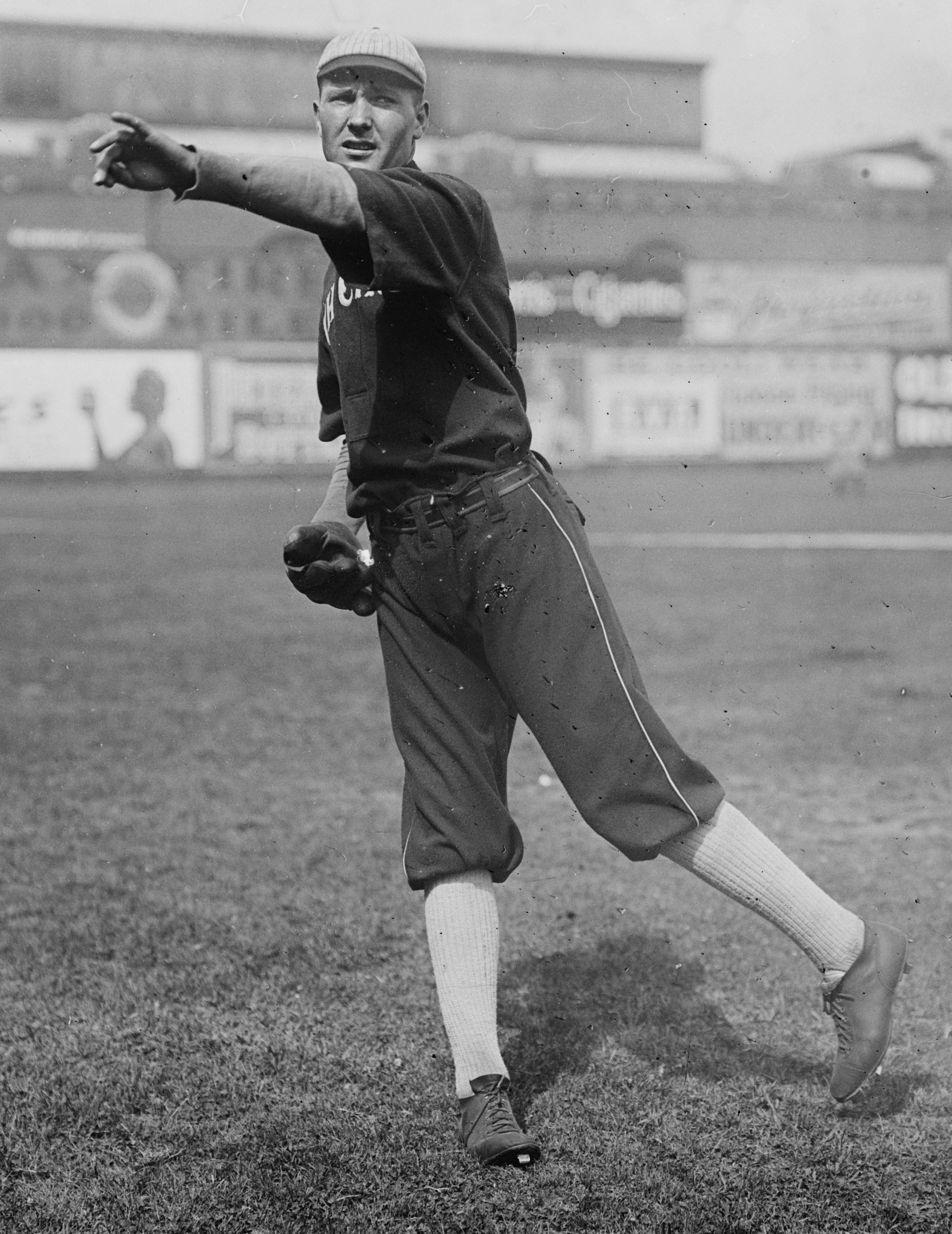
- Bell in 1912
- Pitcher
- Born: November 16, 1890; Argyle, Iowa, U.S.
- Died: October 18, 1959 (aged 68); Burlington, Iowa, U.S.
- Batted: Left Threw: Left

MLB debut
- July 16, 1912, for the Chicago White Sox

Last MLB appearance
- July 22, 1912, for the Chicago White Sox

MLB statistics
- Win–loss record: 0–0
- Earned run average: 9.00
- Strikeouts: 5
- Stats at Baseball Reference

Teams
- Chicago White Sox (1912)

Ralph Albert "Lefty" Bell (November 16, 1890 – October 18, 1959) was an American professional baseball player from 1909 to 1916. A pitcher, he appeared in three Major League Baseball games for the Chicago White Sox in 1912. Bell was 5 feet 11 inches (1.80 m) tall and weighed 170 pounds (77 kg).

== Career ==
Bell was born in Argyle, Iowa, in 1890. With his family, he moved to nearby Kahoka, in Missouri, in his childhood. He started his professional baseball career in 1909. That season, he pitched for two minor league teams and won nine games for each. He was then purchased by the National League's New York Giants and went to spring training with them in early 1910, but he was unable to make the team for the regular season. Instead, Bell spent the 1910 season with the Western Association's Joplin Miners. In 33 games for Joplin, he went 21-7 and led the league in wins. The Miners finished the season in first place with a record of 90-34 and is considered one of the greatest minor league teams of all time.

The following season, Bell pitched for the Central Association's Burlington Pathfinders and won 21 games again. After starting 1912 with a record of 12–8, he was purchased by the Chicago White Sox of the American League. He made three relief appearances for the White Sox in July and allowed six earned runs in six innings. He then returned to the minors. In 1913, while playing for the Northern League's Winona Pirates, Bell set a career-high in wins, with 28. No other pitcher in the league had more than 20. He played for Winona again in 1914 and won 15. He then joined the Northern League's Fargo-Moorhead Graingrowers, and in 1915 he went 22–13 to lead his league in wins for the third and final time.

Bell's professional baseball career ended after the 1916 season. Overall, he went 156–90 in the minor leagues for a career .634 winning percentage. Bell died in Burlington, Iowa, in 1959.
