= Cy Neighbors =

American baseball player (1880–1964)

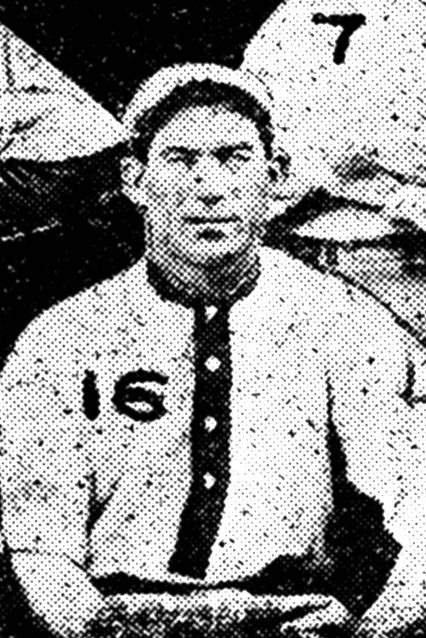
- Outfielder
- Born: September 23, 1880; Fayetteville, Missouri, U.S.
- Died: May 20, 1964 (aged 83); Tacoma, Washington, U.S.
- Batted: Right Threw: Unknown

MLB debut
- April 29, 1908, for the Pittsburgh Pirates

Last MLB appearance
- April 29, 1908, for the Pittsburgh Pirates

MLB statistics
- Games: 1
- At-bats: 0
- Hits: 0
- Stats at Baseball Reference

Teams
- Pittsburgh Pirates (1908)

Cecil Flemon "Cy" Neighbors (September 23, 1880 – May 20, 1964) was an American professional baseball outfielder.

== Playing career ==
Neighbors had played for the minor league Toledo Mud Hens in 1905, and in 1907 he played for Burlington, leading the Iowa State League in hits and runs scored. His one appearance in the major leagues was with the 1908 Pittsburgh Pirates. He played left field, which was player-manager Fred Clarke's position.

In 1910, Neighbors joined the Sioux City Packers, batted .333, and led the Western League in hits, with 206. He also stole 34 bases. The Packers won 108 games and the pennant.

Neighbors later spent five seasons in the Northwestern League. His career ended in 1920.
