= Frank Gregory (baseball) =

American baseball player (1888–1955)

- Pitcher
- Born: July 25, 1888; Spring Valley, Wisconsin, U.S.
- Died: November 5, 1955 (aged 67); Beloit, Wisconsin, U.S.
- Batted: Right Threw: Right

MLB debut
- September 5, 1912, for the Cincinnati Reds

Last MLB appearance
- October 6, 1912, for the Cincinnati Reds

MLB statistics
- Win–loss record: 2–0
- Earned run average: 4.60
- Strikeouts: 4
- Stats at Baseball Reference

Teams
- Cincinnati Reds (1912)

Frank Ernst Gregory (July 25, 1888 – November 5, 1955) was an American professional baseball player. He was a right-handed pitcher for one season (1912) with the Cincinnati Reds. For his career, he compiled a 2–0 record, with a 4.60 earned run average, and four strikeouts in 15 2/3 innings pitched.

He was born in Spring Valley (town), Wisconsin and died in Beloit, Wisconsin at the age of 67.
