= Walt Meinert =

American baseball player

- Right fielder
- Born: December 11, 1890; New York City, New York, U.S.
- Died: November 9, 1958 (aged 67); Decatur, Illinois, U.S.
- Batted: Left Threw: Left

MLB debut
- September 6, 1913, for the St. Louis Browns

Last MLB appearance
- September 12, 1913, for the St. Louis Browns

MLB statistics
- Games played: 4
- At bats: 8
- Hits: 3
- Stats at Baseball Reference

Teams
- St. Louis Browns (1913)

Walter Henry Meinert (December 11, 1890 – November 9, 1958) was an American Major League Baseball right fielder who played for the St. Louis Browns in 1913.
