= Ray Boyd (baseball) =

American baseball player (1887–1920)

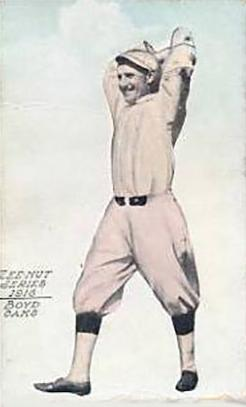
- Pitcher
- Born: February 11, 1887; Hortonville, Indiana, U.S.
- Died: February 11, 1920 (aged 33); Hortonville, Indiana, U.S.
- Batted: Right Threw: Right

MLB debut
- September 24, 1910, for the St. Louis Browns

Last MLB appearance
- October 12, 1911, for the Cincinnati Reds

MLB statistics
- Win–loss record: 2–4
- Earned run average: 3.09
- Strikeouts: 26
- Stats at Baseball Reference

Teams
- St. Louis Browns (1910); Cincinnati Reds (1911)

Raymond C. Boyd (February 11, 1887 – February 11, 1920) was an American professional baseball player. He was a right-handed pitcher over parts of two seasons (1910–11) with the St. Louis Browns, and Cincinnati Reds. For his career, he compiled a 2–4 record, with a 3.09 earned run average, and 26 strikeouts in 58⅓ innings pitched. He died on his 33rd birthday from Spanish flu.

On June 18, 1909, Boyd threw a no-hitter whild pitching for the Burlington Pathfinders in the Class D level Central Association in the 3–0 Burlington victory over the Jacksonville Lunatics, Boyd walked 2 with 4 strikeouts in the contest.
