= Cy Wright =

American baseball player (1893–1947)

- Shortstop
- Born: August 16, 1893; Minneapolis, Minnesota, U.S.
- Died: November 7, 1947 (aged 54); Hines, Illinois, U.S.
- Batted: Right Threw: Right

MLB debut
- June 30, 1916, for the Chicago White Sox

Last MLB appearance
- July 8, 1916, for the Chicago White Sox

MLB statistics
- Games played: 8
- At bats: 18
- Hits: 0
- Stats at Baseball Reference

Teams
- Chicago White Sox (1916)

Ceylon Wright (August 16, 1893 – November 7, 1947) was an American professional baseball player. He played eight games in Major League Baseball for the Chicago White Sox in 1916, all at shortstop.
