= Jim Hackett =

American baseball player (1877–1961)

- First baseman / Pitcher
- Born: October 1, 1877; Jacksonville, Illinois, US
- Died: March 28, 1961 (aged 83); Douglas, Michigan, US
- Batted: Right Threw: Right

MLB debut
- September 14, 1902, for the St. Louis Cardinals

Last MLB appearance
- September 27, 1903, for the St. Louis Cardinals

MLB statistics
- Batting average: .231
- Home runs: 0
- Runs batted in: 40
- Win–loss record: 1–6
- Earned run average: 4.69
- Stats at Baseball Reference

Teams
- St. Louis Cardinals (1902–1903)

James Joseph Hackett (October 1, 1877 – March 28, 1961), nicknamed "Sunny Jim", was an American Major League Baseball player. He played two seasons in the majors for the St. Louis Cardinals. In 1902, he was primarily a pitcher, appearing in 4 games with an 0–3 record at that position. In 1903, he was primarily a first baseman, batting .228, while still appearing in seven games on the mound and going 1–3.

== Sources ==
- Career statistics from Baseball Reference · Baseball Reference (Minors) · Retrosheet · Baseball Almanac
