= Lefty Lorenzen =

American baseball player (1893–1963)

- Pitcher
- Born: January 12, 1893; Davenport, Iowa, U.S.
- Died: March 5, 1963 (aged 70); Davenport, Iowa, U.S.
- Batted: Left Threw: Left

MLB debut
- September 12, 1913, for the Detroit Tigers

Last MLB appearance
- September 12, 1913, for the Detroit Tigers

MLB statistics
- Games pitched: 1
- Earned run average: 18.00
- Innings pitched: 2.0
- Stats at Baseball Reference

Teams
- Detroit Tigers (1913)

Adolph Andreas "Lefty" Lorenzen (January 12, 1893 – March 5, 1963) was an American Major League Baseball pitcher who played in one game for the Detroit Tigers on September 12, 1913. He pitched in two innings, and allowed four hits and four runs.
