= Cy Slapnicka =

American baseball player (1886–1979)

- Pitcher
- Born: March 23, 1886; Cedar Rapids, Iowa, U.S.
- Died: October 20, 1979 (aged 93); Cedar Rapids, Iowa, U.S.
- Batted: Both Threw: Right

MLB debut
- September 26, 1911, for the Chicago Cubs

Last MLB appearance
- August 8, 1918, for the Pittsburgh Pirates

MLB statistics
- Win–loss record: 1–6
- Earned run average: 4.30
- Strikeouts: 13
- Stats at Baseball Reference

Teams
- Chicago Cubs (1911); Pittsburgh Pirates (1918)

Career highlights and awards
- Cleveland Guardians Hall of Fame

Cyril Charles Slapnicka (March 23, 1886 – October 20, 1979) was an American Major League Baseball pitcher and executive. He played for the Chicago Cubs (1911) and Pittsburgh Pirates (1918). His playing career was unusual in that he went almost seven years between major league appearances. He also played 18 years of minor league ball.

In 10 total games pitched Slapnicka had a record of 1–6 with an ERA of 4.30 in 73.1 innings pitched. He started eight games, completed five, and finished two. He also had one save.

His more significant contributions to baseball came when his playing career was over. He was the General Manager of the Cleveland Indians from 1935 to 1940, and then a major league scout for the Indians until he retired in 1961. He signed 31 major league players, including Hall of Famers Bob Feller and Bob Lemon. He resigned as Indians Vice President in September 1941.

Slapnicka died in his hometown of Cedar Rapids, Iowa, at the age of 93.
