= Harry Burrell (baseball) =

American baseball player (1867–1914)

- Pitcher
- Born: May 26, 1867; Bethel, Vermont, U.S.
- Died: December 11, 1914 (aged 47); Omaha, Nebraska, U.S.
- Batted: Unknown Threw: Left

MLB debut
- September 13, 1891, for the St. Louis Browns

Last MLB appearance
- October 3, 1891, for the St. Louis Browns

MLB statistics
- Win–loss record: 4–2
- Earned run average: 4.81
- Strikeouts: 19
- Stats at Baseball Reference

Teams
- St. Louis Browns (1891)

Harry J. Burrell (May 26, 1867 – December 11, 1914) was an American Major League Baseball pitcher and right fielder. He played professionally for the St. Louis Browns of the American Association.

== Biography ==
Burrell was born in Bethel, Vermont. He played major league baseball for one year in 1891. He played his first professional game on September 13, 1891, for the St. Louis Browns. His minor league career continued until 1900.

Burrell died on December 11, 1914, in Omaha, Nebraska. He is interred at Forest Lawn Cemetery in Omaha.
