= Harry Sage =

American baseball player (1864–1947)

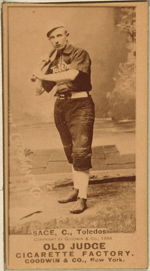
- Catcher
- Born: March 16, 1864; Rock Island, Illinois, U.S.
- Died: May 27, 1947 (aged 83); Rock Island, Illinois, U.S.
- Batted: Right Threw: Right

MLB debut
- April 17, 1890, for the Toledo Maumees

Last MLB appearance
- October 12, 1890, for the Toledo Maumees

MLB statistics
- Batting average: .149
- Home runs: 2
- RBIs: 25
- Stats at Baseball Reference

Teams
- Toledo Maumees (1890)

Harry Sage (March 16, 1864 – May 27, 1947), nicknamed "Doc", was an American Major League Baseball catcher in 1890 for the Toledo Maumees of the American Association. He was a native of Rock Island, Illinois.

In his only major league season, Sage played in 81 out of 132 games for the Maumees. A good defensive catcher, his .948 fielding percentage was above the league average of .925. He was a huge liability at bat, however, hitting a paltry .149 (41-for-275). He managed to contribute some offense, however. He walked 29 times to raise his on-base percentage to .235, scored 40 runs, hit two home runs and drove in 25.

Sage was a minor league manager of the Rock Island Islanders.

Sage died in his hometown of Rock Island, Illinois, at the age of 83.
