= Varney Anderson =

American baseball player (1866-1941)

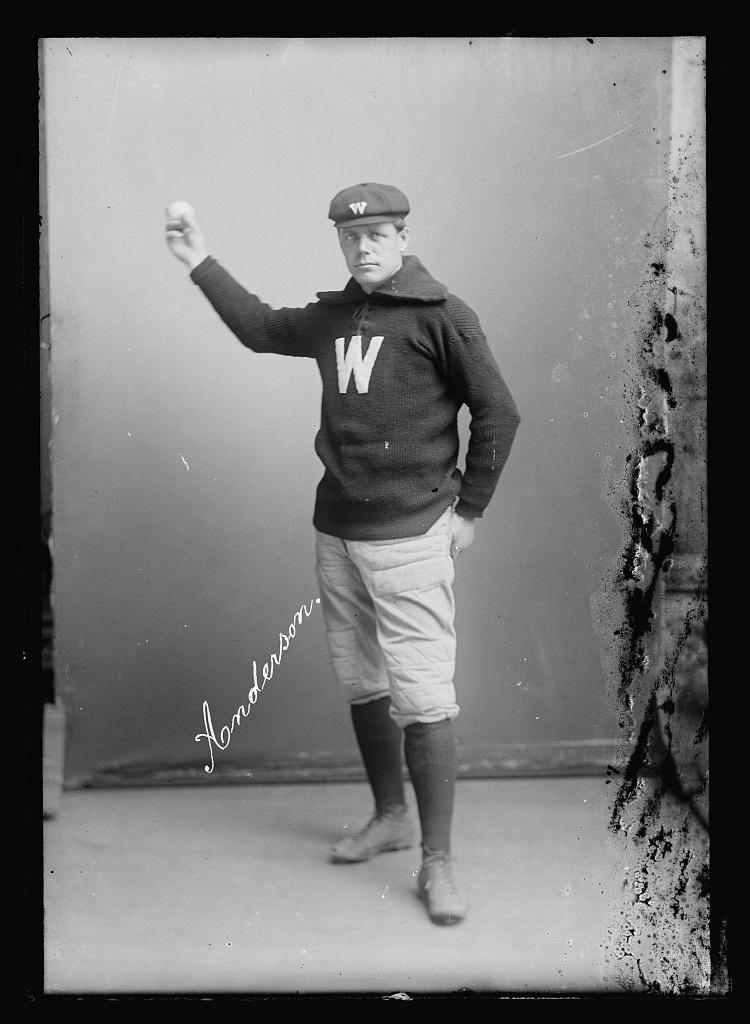
- Anderson, photographed by C. M. Bell Studio
- Pitcher
- Born: June 18, 1866; Geneva, Illinois, U.S.
- Died: November 5, 1941 (aged 75); Rockford, Illinois, U.S.
- Batted: Right Threw: Right

MLB debut
- August 1, 1889, for the Indianapolis Hoosiers

Last MLB appearance
- May 6, 1896, for the Washington Senators

MLB statistics
- Win–loss record: 9-20
- Earned run average: 6.16
- Strikeouts: 41
- Stats at Baseball Reference

Teams
- Indianapolis Hoosiers (1889); Washington Senators (1894–1896)

Varney Samuel "Varn" Anderson (June 18, 1866 – November 5, 1941) was an American Major League Baseball pitcher who played for the Indianapolis Hoosiers and the Washington Senators.

== Professional career ==
=== Early minor league years ===
Anderson played professionally at least as early as 1887 for the minor league Milwaukee Brewers. He split the 1888 season between the Minneapolis Millers and St. Paul Apostles of the Western Association.

=== Indianapolis Hoosiers ===
At the age of 23, Anderson broke into the major leagues with the Indianapolis Hoosiers. In just one season, 1889, Anderson pitched just two games going 0–1 with three strikeouts with a 4.50 ERA in 12 innings pitched.

=== Washington Senators ===
In 1890, Anderson played and managed the non-affiliated Burlington Hawkeyes. For the next three seasons, there is no record of Anderson playing for any major league or minor league team. He finally joined the Washington Senators where in his first year, 1894, Anderson went 0–2 with three strikeouts and a 7.07 ERA in 14 innings pitched.

The next season, 1895, Anderson was used considerably more. He was primarily a starting pitcher but did make a few relief appearances. In 29 games, 25 starts, Anderson went 9–16 with 35 strikeouts, 18 complete games and a 5.86 ERA in 204 2/3 innings pitched.

Anderson's final season with the Senators was in 1896. Anderson went 0–1 with a 13.00 ERA in only two games with nine innings pitched.

Anderson continued playing in the minors in 1897 and 1899 in Rockford, Illinois, and in 1898 for the Rock Island based in St. Joseph, Missouri.

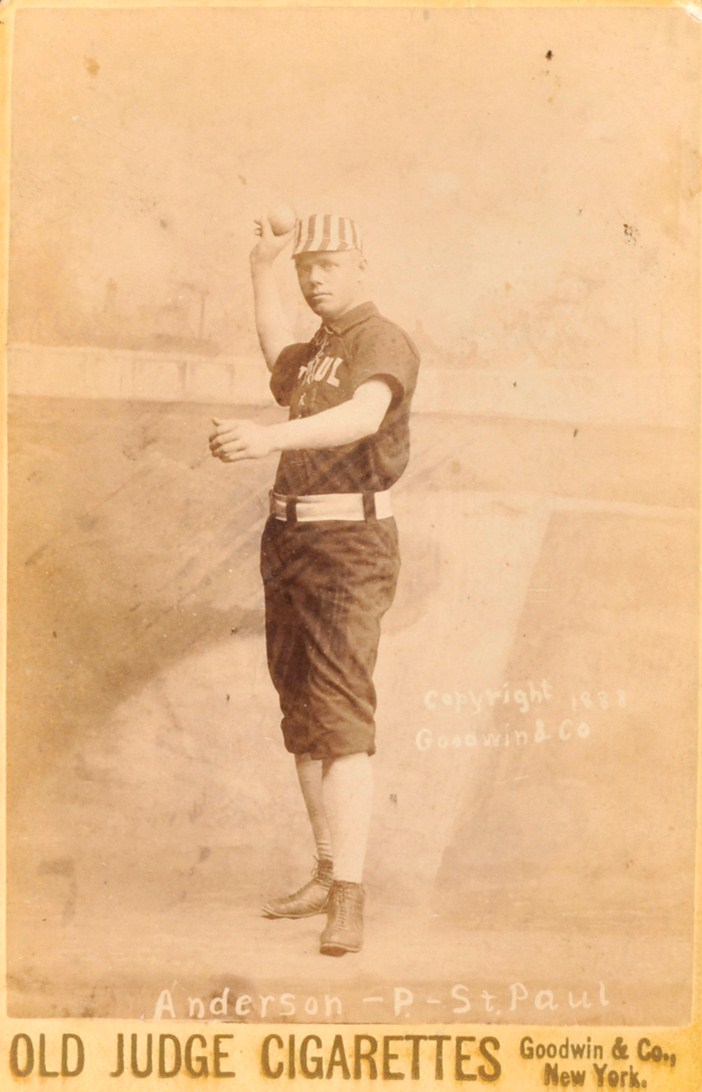

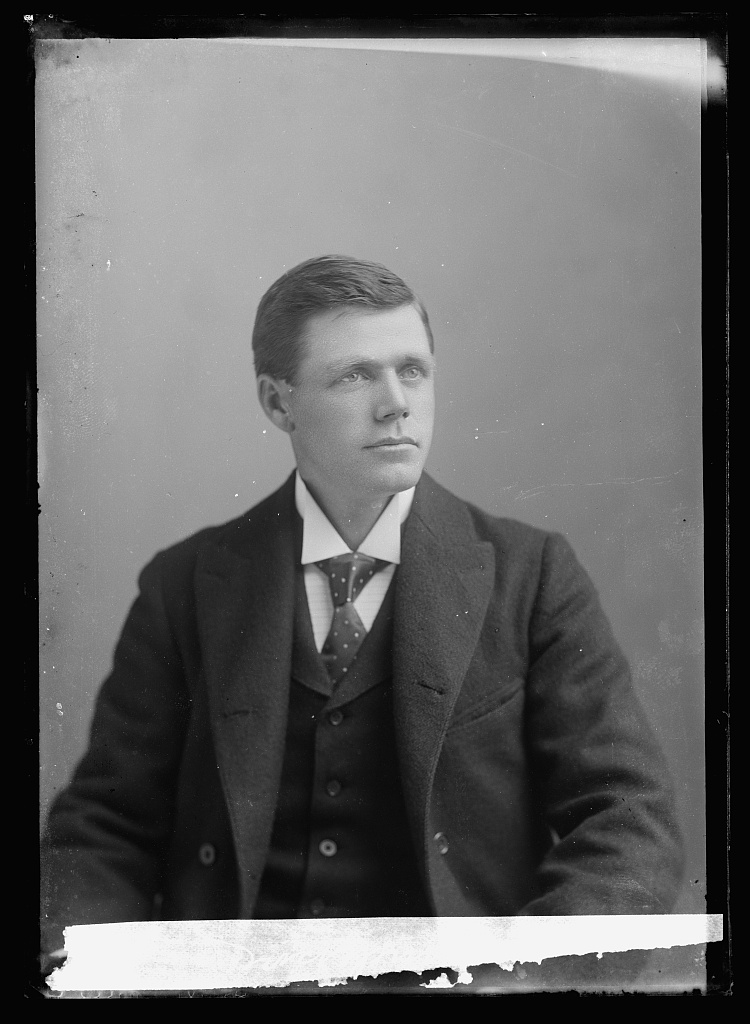

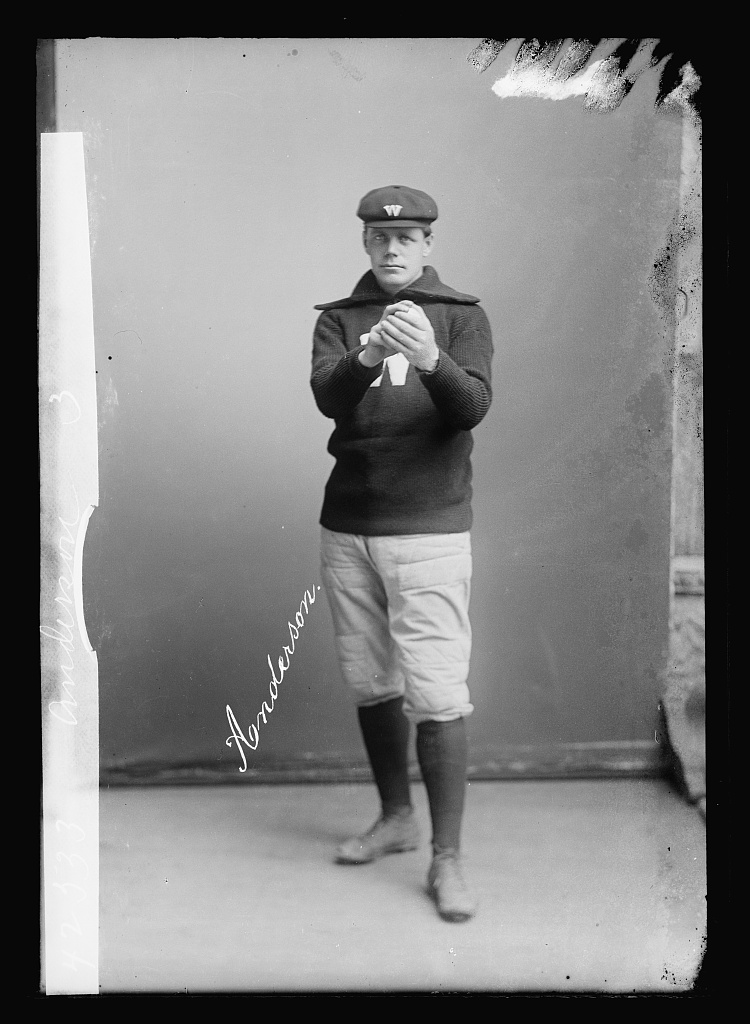

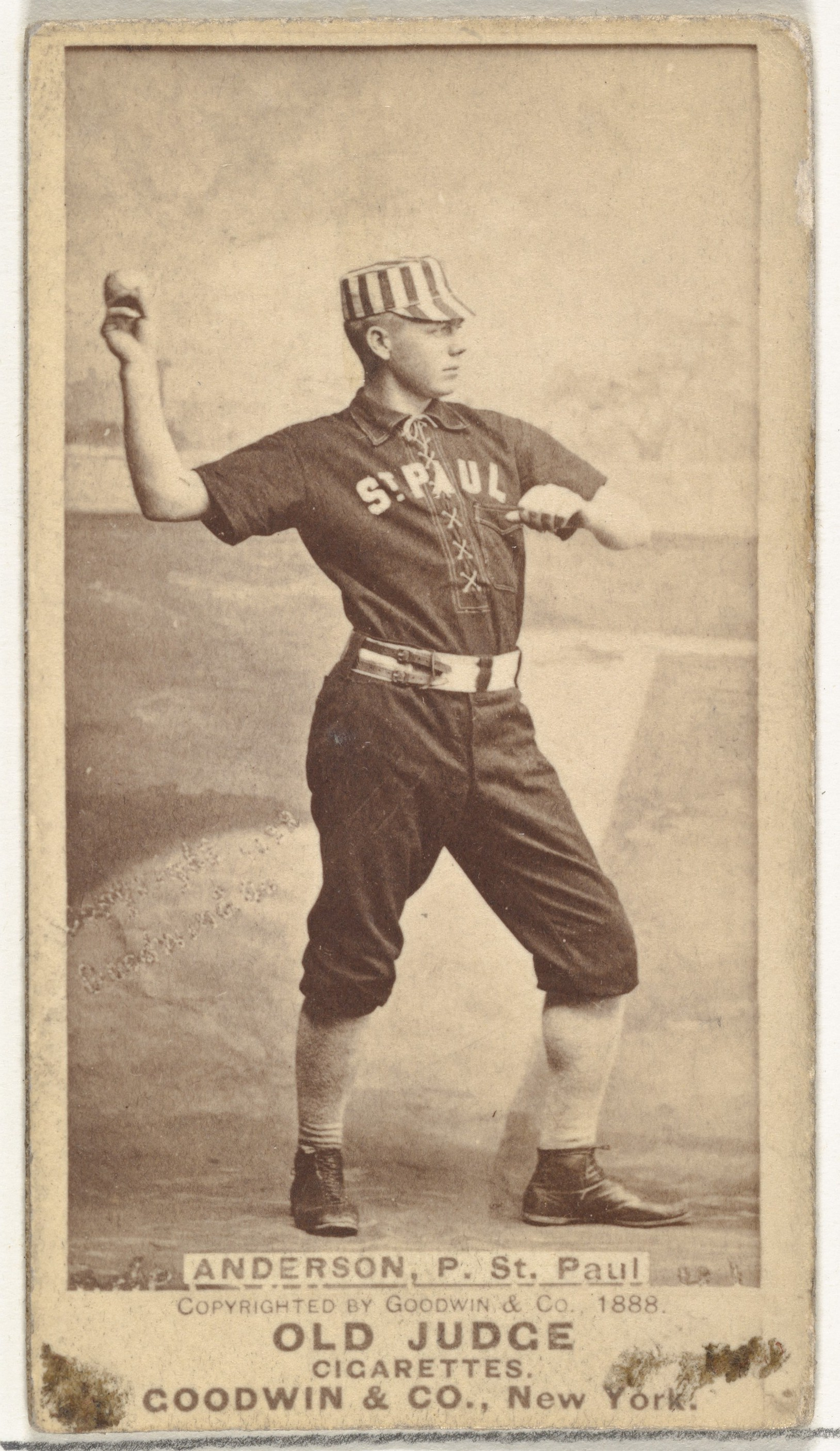
Varney Anderson, 1888
