= Clinton Pilots 1914–1917 =

Clinton Pilots
- 1914–1917; (1895, 1906–1908, 1910, 1914–1917); Clinton, Iowa

Minor league affiliations
- Class: Independent (1895); Class D (1906); Class B (1907–1908); Class D (1910, 1914–1917)
- League: Eastern Iowa League (1895); Iowa State League (1906); Illinois-Indiana-Iowa League (1907–1908); Northern Association (1910); Central Association (1914–1917)

Major league affiliations
- Team: None

Minor league titles
- League titles (0): None

Team data
- Name: Clinton Bridegrooms (1895); Clinton Miners (1906); Clinton Infants (1907–1908); Clinton Teddies (1910); Clinton Pilots (1914–1917)
- Ballpark: Ringwood Park

The Clinton Pilots were a minor league baseball team based in Clinton, Iowa. The Pilots played as members of the Class D level Central Association from 1914 to 1917.

The Pilots were preceded by Clinton teams that played as members of the Independent Class D Eastern Iowa League (1895), Iowa State League (1906), Northern Association (1910) and Class B Illinois-Indiana-Iowa League (1907–1908).

The 1915 Clinton Pilots had 40 victories taken away by the Central Association. In another controversial 1895 season, the Clinton Bridegrooms were expelled from the Eastern Iowa League twice during the season. After first their expulsion, Clinton was allowed back into the league weeks later, only to be quickly expelled from the Eastern Iowa League for a second time during the season.

The Clinton Pilots and the earlier Clinton teams played home minor league games at Ringwood Park in Clinton, which hosted minor league games through 1937.

From 1966 to 1976, the Clinton Midwest League franchise of the era was also known as the Clinton Pilots.

== History ==
=== 1895: Controversial Eastern Iowa League season ===
Clinton began hosting minor league play in 1895, when the Clinton "Bridegrooms" were formed. The new Clinton team became charter members of the eight-team, independent Eastern Iowa League. The Burlington Colts, Cedar Rapids Rabbits, Dubuque Colts, Galesburg Trotters, Ottumwa Brownies, Rock Island Tri-Cities and Waterloo Indians teams in league play. The Eastern Iowa League began play on May 10, 1895, as an eight–team league. Playing in the day game era, the local businesses of the home team regularly closed when their team hosted home games.

The 1895 Eastern Iowa league had a tumultuous season in their only season of play and the Clinton team was a contributor to the storyline. After the season began, three teams were "expelled" from the league. One of the teams was expelled twice and another team folded. On June 14, 1895, both the Clinton Bridegrooms and the Rock Island Tri-Cities teams were expelled from the Eastern Iowa League. The Galesburg Trotters franchise folded on June 25, 1895. After their expulsion from the league, on July 4, 1895 the Clinton Bridegrooms were allowed to rejoin the Eastern Iowa League. However, on July 8, 1895, just four days after being reinstated, the Clinton Bridegrooms were expelled from the league for a second time, along with the Waterloo Indians, who were expelled from the Eastern Iowa League the same day.

The Clinton Bridegrooms ended their volatile 1895 season with compiling a record of 11–26 in before their expulsion. The Bridegroom managers were George Shugart and Edward Corbett. In the final standings, the Dubuque Colts won the championship with a 66–31 record as the Eastern Iowa League finished the season playing with four teams. Dubuque captured the Eastern Iowa League championship by winning both halves of the league's split season schedule, so no playoff was held.

The Eastern Iowa League did not return to minor league play in 1896 and permanently disbanded after the 1895 season was completed on August 25, 1895.

=== 1906: Partial Iowa State League season ===
After an eleven-year hiatus, Clinton next hosted minor league play in 1906, when Clinton resumed play during the season as members of the eight-team Class D level Iowa State League. The Iowa State League began their 1906 season without Clinton as a member. The Boone Coal Miners, Burlington River Rats, Fort Dodge Gypsum Eaters, Keokuk Indians, Marshalltown Grays, Oskaloosa Quakers, Ottumwa Snappers and Waterloo Microbes were the member teams that started league play on May 6, 1908. The Iowa State League had the formal name as the "Iowa League of Professional Baseball Clubs."

Clinton's membership in the Iowa State League began on July 14, 1906, when the Boone Coal Miners franchise moved from Boone, Iowa to Clinton. Boone had compiled a record of 25–33 at the time of the move to Clinton. After the relocation, the team finished the season known as the Clinton "Miners." After compiling a 21–37 record while based in Clinton, the Miners ended the season with an overall record of 46–70. Clinton ended the 1906 Iowa State League season in sixth place in the eight-team league, while playing the season under managers William Wooley, Harold Johnson and Patrick Ryan in the two locations. No playoffs held in the Iowa State League, as the Burlington River Rats ended the season in first place in the final Iowa State League standings, as the rest of the eight-team league franchises remained intact. In the final standings, Clinton finished 34.0 games behind first place Burlington, who had an 83–39 record and finished a full 9.0 games ahead of the second place Oskaloosa Quakers and 38.5 games ahead of the eighth place Ottumwa Champs who went from first place as indicated by their nickname to last place.

Despite joining the league the season prior, the Clinton franchise did not return to membership the 1907 Iowa State League and were replaced by the Quincy Gems. Instead of continuing in the Iowa State League, the Clinton franchise continued play in 1907 in a new league.

=== 1907 & 1908 Illinois–Indiana–Iowa League ===
Leaving the Iowa State League, Clinton continued minor league play in 1907, as the Clinton "Infants" became members of the eight team Class B level (the equivalent of today's Class AA) Illinois–Indiana–Iowa League. The Illinois–Indiana–Iowa League was known commonly as the Three-I League. Clinton replaced the Davenport Knickerbockers team in the league, after Davenport finished in last place the season prior and then folded. The new Clinton team joined with the Bloomington Bloomers, Cedar Rapids Rabbits, Decatur Commodores, Dubuque Dubs, Peoria Distillers, Rock Island Islanders and Springfield Senators teams in beginning the league schedule on May 1, 1907.

Monte McFarland was hired to manage Clinton in 1907. McFarland had pitched in 6 total games for the major league Chicago Colts in 1895 and 1896. As player-manager for Clinton at age 34, McFarland did not pitch and batted .190 in 26 games and 95 at-bats for Clinton. Leaving Clinton during the season, McFarland ended the 1907 season playing 101 games for the Oklahoma City Mets of the Class C level Western Association, hitting .168 in 376 at-bats for the Mets.

Clinton pitcher Harry Stauffer replaced McFarland as manager and compiled a 12–14 record on the season.

In their first season of Illinois–Indiana–Iowa League play, the 1907 Clinton Infants ended the season in sixth place. With a final record of 53–78 record under Monte McFarland, the Infants finished 27½ games behind the first place Rock Island Islanders in the final standings. No league playoffs were held, which was common in the era.

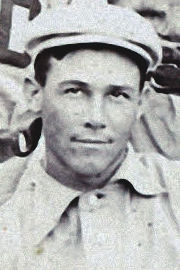
(1899) Charlie Buelow, New York Giants. Buelow was the player-manager for Clinton in 1908

The 1908 Clinton Infants continued play in the eight-team Class B level Illinois–Indiana–Iowa League and finished in last place. The 1908 team was also known as the "Adults." Clinton ended the season with a 55–78 record and in eighth place under managers Harry Stauffer and Charlie Buelow. With their last place finish, Clinton ended the season 25½ games behind the first place Springfield Senators in the final Illinois–Indiana–Iowa League standings.

Harry Stauffer returned to Clinton, beginning the season as player-manager. Stauffer compiled a 2-10 pitching record for Clinton in 14 games before being replaced as manager.

Clinton's 1908 player-manager Charlie Buelow had played in the major leagues with the 1901 New York Giants. Buelow had been a player in 1908 with the Evansville River Rats of the Central League. With Clinton at age 31, Buelow played first base and hit .256 in 135 games with 27 stolen bases. in 1909, Buelow remained in the Illinois–Indiana–Iowa League as he became player-manager of the Dubuque Dubs.

Despite pitching for the last place team, Clinton pitcher Bill Fleet was the 1908 Illinois–Indiana–Iowa League co-league leader with 23 wins on the season. Born in the United Kingdom and pitching for Clinton at age 30, Bill Fleet compiled a 23–12 record in 38 games for the Infants in 1908, on the heels of a 9–20 season while pitching for Clinton the season prior. Fleet pitched his final minor league season with Davenport in 1909.

After their last place finish, Clinton did not return to the 1909 Illinois–Indiana–Iowa League. The Clinton franchise was replaced by the Davenport Prodigals in the eight-team league. Clinton had replaced Davenport in the Illinois–Indiana–Iowa League two seasons earlier.

=== 1910: Clinton Teddies / Northern Association ===
After not fielding a team in the 1909 season, Clinton resumed minor league play in 1910, when the Clinton "Teddies" became charter members of the eight-team Class D level Northern Association. When the Northern Association was formed in the winter of 1909-1910, E.M. Kehoe representing Clinton was named as the vice president of the league and Ted Sullivan was listed as the "magnate" for Clinton. The newly formed Clinton teams joined with the Decatur Commodores, Elgin Kittens, Freeport Pretzels, Jacksonville Jacks, Joliet Jolly-ites, Kankakee Kays and Muscatine Pearl Finders teams as fellow charter members, beginning league play on May 10, 1910.

Besides reflecting the name of their manager, the Clinton Teddies nickname also corresponds to President Theodore "Teddy" Roosevelt who served as the U.S. President through 1909. Roosevelt inspired his namesake Teddie bears stuffed animal, which became prominent in the era.

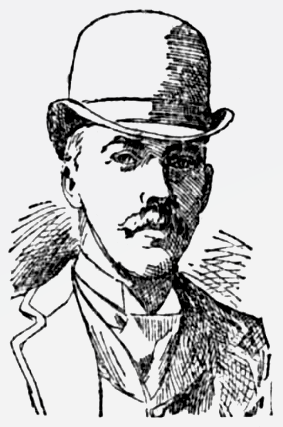
(1893) Ted Sullivan. Sullivan was the manager for the 1910 Clinton Teddies.

Born in Ireland, Ted Sullivan was a former major league player with the 1884 Kansas City Cowboys. Sullivan served as a major league manager for the 1883 St. Louis Cardinals, 1884 St. Louis Maroons/Indianapolis Hoosiers and Kansas City Cowboys and 1888 Washington Nationals. Sullivan then became major league scout and a longtime minor league president, team owner and manager. After his 1910 season with Clinton, Sullivan was hired by the New York Giants to establish their 1911 Spring training site, and then coached the baseball team at St. Louis University in 1911. At age 59, the 1910 season with Clinton was his final season serving as a minor league manager.

On the opening day for the Northern Association on May 10, 1910, Clinton hosted the Elgin Kittens for their home opener. The Kittens were the namesake of their manager Mal Kittridge, who had a 16-season career as a major league catcher. Elgin started the season strongly after the opening game at Clinton.

A longtime minor league player, Hunkey Hines played for Clinton in 1910, in his final minor league season. Hines had played in the major leagues for the 1895 Brooklyn Grooms. In a minor league playing career that started in 1887 with the Milwaukee Cream Citys at age 19, Hines played and managed in his final season in 1910 at age 42. Hines began the 1910 season as the manager of the Joliet team before it relocated. His final playing appearance was a partial game at second base and an 0-1 appearance as a batter.

Playing under manager Ted Sullivan and John Mammen, Clinton folded before the end of the Northern Association, as did the entire league. The 1910 season was Mannens only season as a minor league professional. The Teddies had compiled a 10–39 record when the team folded on June 28, 1910. Besides Clinton folding, the Joliet Jolly-ites moved to Sterling on June 21, Freeport disbanded with Clinton on June 28 and the Elgin and Kankakee franchises both disbanded on July 11, 1910. With four remaining teams, the Northern Association folded on July 19, 1910, with the Muscatine Pearl Finders (37–321) in first place of the remaining league teams after Elgin (37–20) had folded with a better record.

Baseball Hall of Fame member Casey Stengel played with the 1910 Kankakee Kays against Clinton in his first professional season. Clinton hosted Kankakee in Northern Association games from May 25 to May 27 and Clinton played at Kankakee June 16 to June 18, 1910.

The Northern Association never reformed following their partial 1910 season. Clinton did not field a minor league for the next three seasons,

=== 1914 to 1917: Clinton Pilots / Central Association ===
After three seasons without a team, minor league baseball resumed in 1914, when the Clinton "Pilots" were formed and joined the eight-team Class D level Central Association. The new Clinton Pilots team replaced the Monmouth Browns franchise in the league. The new Clinton team joined with the returning Jacksonville Lunatics, Keokuk Indians, Oskaloosa Quakers, Ottumwa Packers, Quincy Gems, Waterloo Lulus, and Kewanee Boilermakers teams The Central Association began the league schedule on May 7, 1914.

The Pilots nickname corresponds with Clinton's geographic location on the Mississippi River. A Mississippi River Pilot is responsible for guiding ships along the Mississippi River.

The Clinton Pilots' manager was Bert Houth. The previous season, Houth had been the manager of the Monmouth Browns franchise in 1913 and remained in the league to manage Clinton in 1914. Hough had been a manager in the Central Association since 1909, when he led the Hannibal Cannibals to the first league championship. Hough then managed the Galesburg Pavers and had managed the Monmouth Browns in both 1912 and 1913.

During the 1914, Central Association season, the Ottumwa Packers franchise remained in the Central Association, but the franchise moved to Rock Island, Illinois on July 17, 1914. In a ruling over the league relocation, the National Association which governed minor league baseball, did not allow the Central Association to place a franchise in the territory of the Three-I League, so Rock Island quickly moved to Galesburg, Illinois on July 24, 1914, finishing the season as the Galesburg Pavers. The rest of the league franchises remained stable during the season.

In their first season in the new league, the 1914 Clinton Pilots ended the season in fourth place in the final standings of the eight-team Central Association. The Pilots finished the season with a record of 67–61 to secure their fourth-place finish under manager Bert Hough. No league playoffs were held. In the final standings, Clinton ended the season 10½ games behind the first place Waterloo Jays in the final standings, and also finished behind second place Burlington and third place Muscatine, as the relocated Ottumwa/Rock Island/Galesburg team finished in last place. The 1914 season was the final season for Bert Hough managed in minor league baseball.

Clinton continued play in the Central Association in 1915 with a new manager. 30-year-old George Manush was hired to be the player-manager for the Clinton Pilots. Previously, Manush had served as the player-manager of the 1913 Keokuk Indians and the player-manager for the Burlington Pathfinders in 1914. George Manush was the older brother of Baseball Hall of Fame member Heinie Manush and two were included in the six Manush brothers to play professional baseball. The family resided in Tuscumbia, Alabama. George Manush remained as a Burlington resident and owned a plumbing business in Burlington. At age 37, George Manush died in Burlington in 1923 when he was electrocuted in an automobile accident. Heine Manush lived and worked with his brother in Burlington as a 17 year old, before beginning his professional baseball career.

With George Manush serving as the Clinton manager in 1915, the team folded before the end of the season after some controversy. In the official final standings, the Burlington Pathfinders ended the season in first place with a final record of 81–38. No playoffs were held and first place Burlington finished 18½ games ahead of the second place Muscatine Muskies (63–57) after the league ended the season with seven teams without the Clinton Pilots who folded during the season. The Clinton Pilots had a 13–69 official record when folding during the season. Their record reflected the Pilots' adjusted record after 40 Clinton wins were thrown out, vacating them from a 53–29 record. Three other league franchises were also penalized, as the Keokuk (18), Marshalltown (5) and Waterloo (1) teams, also had wins vacated, but those three teams remained in play through the end of the season.

Bruce Evans played for Clinton in 1915. Evans had played in the minor leagues since 1904 and would play the 1916 season in the Kansas City All Nations touring team. A catcher, Evans batted .208 in 98 games for Clinton at age 31.

At age 18, Bert Ellison signed with the St. Louis Cardinals in the spring of 1915 and was assigned to Clinton. An Arkansas native, Ellison had attended the University of Arkansas, where he played third base and led the Arkansas Razorbacks baseball team in batting in 1914. In the fall of 1914, Ellison played for the Arkansas Razorbacks football team. Ellison played shortstop for the Pilots compiled a .251 batting average in 112 games in his first professional baseball season. In August 1915, the Detroit Tigers purchased Ellison from the Clinton club. He was assigned for the 1916 season to the Muscatine Muskies, remaining in Central Association. He compiled a .361 batting average in 127 games with the Muskies. In August 1916, the Tigers purchased Ellison's contract from Muscatine. Ellison made his major league debut with the Detroit Tigers at age 19 on September 18, 1916.

Despite folding during the previous season, the Clinton Pilots returned to the Central Association in 1916 and ended the season as the runner-up in the eight-team Class D level league. James Drohan became the Clinton team player-manager at age 38. A pitcher, Drohan had played for Clinton in 1915, compiling a 12-8 record as a pitcher during the previous season. Led by James Drohan, Clinton compiled a 73–51 record in 1916. The Pilots finished 2½ games behind the first place Marshalltown Ansons in the final standings. During the Central Association season, the last place Muscatine Muskies, were forced to forfeit 34 wins.

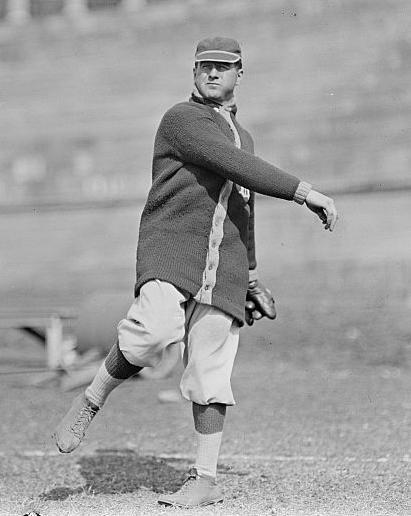
(1913) Tom Drohan, Washington Senators. Drohan pithed for Clinton in 1916, alongside his brother James Drohan, who was the Clinton player-manager.

Manager James Drohan compiled a 12–5 record with a 1.71 ERA in 28 games and 179 innings for the Pilots. His brother Tom Drohan pitched to a 9–6 record with a 2.34 ERA in 26 games.

Tom Drohan, played for Clinton in 1916, after having made his major league debut with the 1913 Washington Senators. At age 28, Tom Drohan was the younger brother of the manager and had a lengthy tenure of pitching in the league. In 1911, Drohan pitched for the Central Association's Kewanee Boilermakers, with a record of 19–10. In 1912 with Kewanee he had a record of 24–6. In 1913 Tom Drohan pitched in the major leagues with the Washington Senators. He then returned to the Central Association in 1914 with the Waterloo Jays and went 15–7 for Waterloo that season and 14–17 in 1915. Drohan then pitched for the Clinton Pilots in 1916 and went 9–6 with a 2.34 earned run average.

The Clinton Pilots played their final season in the 1917 Western Association, folding during the season. The league eventually folded following the completion of the 1917 season. The Pilots team folded on July 17, 1917, along with the La Crosse Infants franchise. At the time their franchise folded, Clinton had compiled a 40–33 record, playing the partial season under manager Larry Brown. After Clinton and La Crosse folded, the Western Association then shortened their season and ended play on August 7, 1917. Despite playing a shortened season, Clinton's Bing Miller won the league batting title, hitting .337. Miller also led the league with 106 total hits.

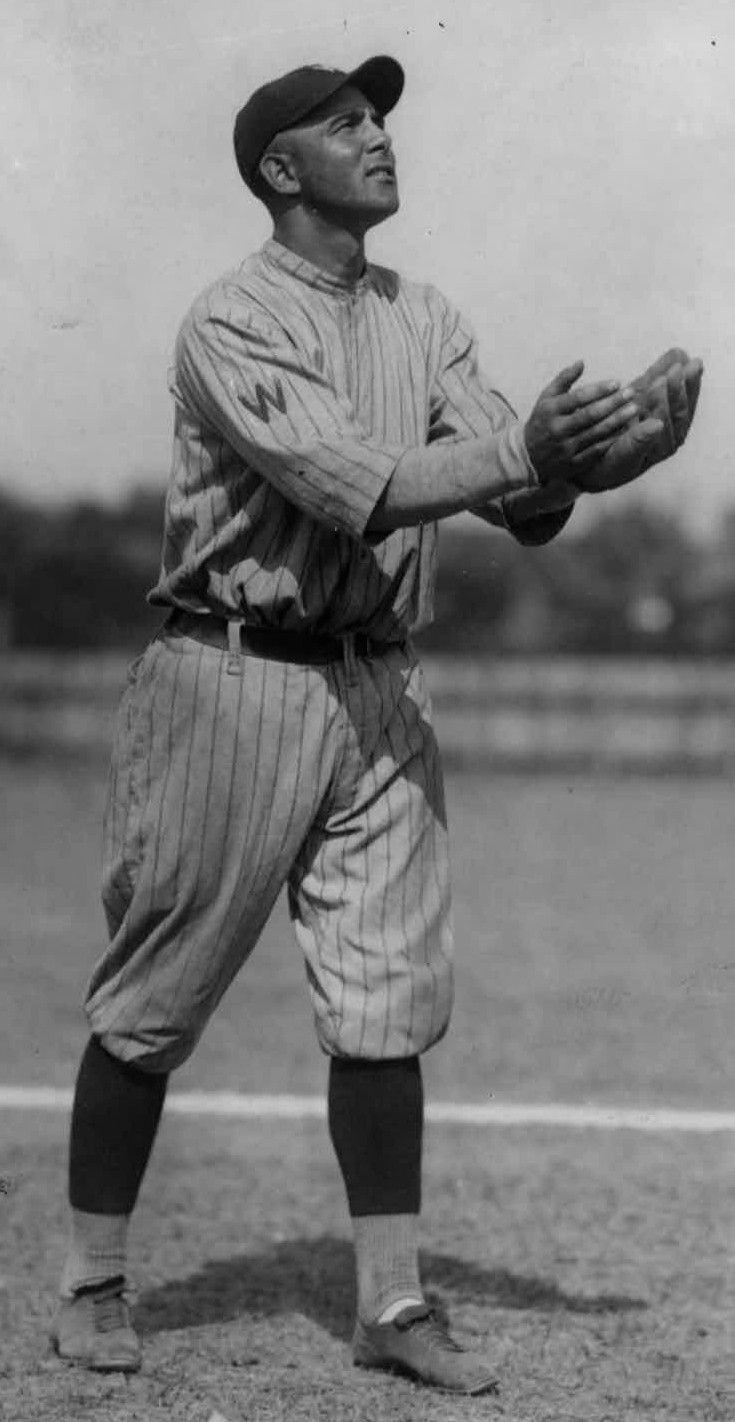
(1921) Bing Miller, Washington Senators. Miller played with the Clinton Pilots in 1914, 1916 and 1917, winning the batting title in 1917.

A native of Vinton, Iowa, Bing Miller played for Clinton in 1914 and 1916 and 1917. A member of the Philadelphia Baseball Wall of Fame, Miller debuted in the major leagues in 1921, at the age of 26 with the Washington Senators and was traded to the Philadelphia Athletics after one season.

With Philadelphia, Miller was the starting right fielder for the Athletics during their era of three consecutive American League pennants. Miller was in the batting orders with three future Baseball Hall of Fame members in Al Simmons, Jimmie Foxx, and Mickey Cochrane.

In his sixteen-year major league career, Miller played with the Washington Senators (1921), Philadelphia Athletics (1922–1926), St. Louis Browns (1926–1927), Philadelphia Athletics (1928–1934) and Boston Red Sox (1935–1936). Miller retired with .311 career batting average, along with 946 runs, 389 doubles, 96 triples, 116 home runs, 993 runs batted in, 127 stolen bases, 383 bases on balls, .359 on-base percentage and .461 slugging percentage. He batted .258 with 17 hits in 18 World Series games. After his playing career ended, Miller was a coach in the American League for 17 years Boston Red Sox (1937), Detroit Tigers (1938–1941), Chicago White Sox (1942–1949) and Athletics (1950–1953).

The Central Association did not return to play in 1918. Clinton next hosted minor league baseball in 1937, when the Clinton Owls were formed and began another tenure of play as members of the Class D level Illinois–Indiana–Iowa League.

The Central Association reformed in 1947, with the Clinton Cubs rejoining the league and winning the first two league championships in the reformed league.

Clinton became a long-time member of the Midwest League, beginning as a charter member of the league in 1956. From 1966 to 1976, the Clinton team was again known as the Pilots.

== The ballpark ==
The Clinton Pilots and the earlier Clinton teams hosted home minor league games at Ringwood Park. The ballpark hosted Clinton minor league home games through 1937. In the era, the Ringwood Park neighborhood was seven blocks of open fields with the ballpark contained within. The park also hosted various circuses in the era.

In 1889, trotting horses were shown at Ringwood Park.

In 1905, the local Clinton baseball team hosted exhibition games featuring the Chicago Union Giants and the Leland’s Chicago Giants of the Negro Leagues.

Ringwood Park hosted the Clinton Independents professional football team home games during the 1919 football season.

At Ringwood Park on July 22, 1909, Buffalo Bill Cody and Pawnee Bill performed a show at the park in which live ammunition was used and spectators were shot.

In 1919, Ringwood Park hosted the Clinton Independents professional football team home games.

The ballpark also hosted the Clinton High School football team in the era. The ballpark was located near the Hawthorne School which closed in 1979. It was constructed in 1894

The ballpark site within Ringwood Park was located at the parcel that is 4th Street & 10th Avenue North in Clinton, Iowa. Today, the site is a residential area.

== Timeline ==
Year(s)	# Yrs.	Team	Level	League	Ballpark
1895	1	Clinton Bridegrooms	Independent	Eastern Iowa League	Ringwood Park
1906	1	Clinton Miners	Class D	Iowa State League	Ringwood Park
1907-1908	2	Clinton Infants	Class B	Illinois–Indiana–Iowa League	Ringwood Park
1910	1	Clinton Teddies	Class D	Northern Association	Ringwood Park
1914–1917	4	Clinton Pilots	Class D	Central Association	Ringwood Park

== Year–by–year records ==
Year	Record	Finish	Manager	Playoffs/notes
1895	11–26	NA	George Shugart / Edward Corbett	Expelled from league June 14 & July 8
1906	46–70	6th	William Wooley / Harold Johnson; Patrick Ryan	No playoffs held Boone (25–33) moved to Clinton
1907	53–78	6th	Monte McFarland / Harry Stauffer	No playoffs held
1908	55–78	8th	Harry Stauffer / Charlie Buelow	No playoffs held
1910	10–39	NA	Ted Sullivan / John Marmen	Team folded June 28
1914	67–61	4th	Bert Hough	No playoffs held
1915	13–69	NA	George Manush	40 victories reversed Team folded
1916	73–51	2nd	James Drohan	No playoffs held
1917	40–33	NA	Larry Brown	Team folded July 17

== Notable alumni ==
- Charlie Buelow (1908, MGR)
- Joe Burg (1907)
- Bill Burwell (1917)
- Davey Crockett (1907–1908)
- Tom Drohan (1916)
- Bert Ellison (1915)
- Bruce Evans (1915)
- Charlie French (1907)
- Hunkey Hines (1910)
- Joe Hovlik (1908)
- Charlie Jaeger (1908)
- Deacon Jones (1914–1916)
- Bill Lelivelt (1907)
- George Lyons (1915)
- Monte McFarland (1907, MGR)
- Bing Miller (1914, 1916–1917) Philadelphia Baseball Wall of Fame
- Dutch Schliebner (1914, 1916)
- Ziggy Sears (1916–1917)
- Ted Sullivan (1910, MGR)
- Carl Vandagrift (1907)
- Jim Walkup (1917)

== See also ==
- Clinton Pilots players
- Clinton Teddies players
- Clinton Infants players
