= Freeport Pretzels =

- 1905–1915; (1905–1910, 1915); Freeport, Illinois

Minor league affiliations
- Class: Class B (1915) Class D (1905–1910, 1915)
- League: Wisconsin State League (1905–1907); Wisconsin-Illinois League (1908–1909); Northern Association (1910); Bi-State League (1915); Illinois-Indiana-Iowa League (1915)

Major league affiliations
- Team: None

Minor league titles
- League titles (1): 1907

Team data
- Name: Freeport Pretzels (1905–1910, 1915); Freeport Comeons (1915)
- Ballpark: Taylor Park (1905–1910, 1915)

The Freeport Pretzels were a minor league baseball franchise based in Freeport, Illinois. Between 1908 and 1915, Freeport teams played as members of the Wisconsin State League (1905–1907), Wisconsin-Illinois League (1908–1909), 1910 Northern Association, 1915 Bi-State League and 1915 Illinois-Indiana-Iowa League. Freeport won the 1907 Wisconsin State League championship and hosted home minor league games at Taylor Park.

The "Pretzels" nickname corresponds to Freeport being known as "Pretzel City." Freeport High School athletic teams later adopted the moniker and use it to this day.

== History ==
The 1905 Freeport Pretzels began minor league baseball play as charter members of six–team Class D level Wisconsin State League, playing home games at the Taylor Park ballfield. The Freeport Pretzels ended their first season of Wisconsin Association play with a record of 54–56, placing third in the Wisconsin State League standings, finishing 14½ games behind the champion LaCrosse Pinks (68–41). Nick Malvern and Bill Moriarty were the 1905 managers. Freeport played the first season of the league with the Beloit Collegians (50–59), Green Bay Colts (47–62), La Crosse Pinks, Oshkosh Indians (60–47) and Wausau Lumberjacks (47–61) teams, all based in Wisconsin.

The "Pretzels" moniker was chosen as reference to Freeport, Illinois being known as the "Pretzel City" beginning about "1885. Freeport High School athletic teams later adopted the "Pretzels" moniker in 1926.

In their second season of minor league play, the Freeport Pretzels continued in the 1906 Wisconsin State League, as the only Illinois based franchise in the league. The Pretzels ended the 1906 season with a 73–43 record, finishing second in the league standings under manager Bill Moriarty. Freeport finished 2.0 games behind the first place LaCrosse Pinks. On July 4, 1906, Freeport pitcher Jack Warhop threw the franchise's first no-hitter in a game that ended in a 0–0 tie against the LaCrosse Pinks. Warhop became a resident of Freeport and died there in 1960. Earlier, Freeport had played an exhibition game against a semi–pro Nebraska Indians team, with Warhop pitching 12 innings against the Pretzels in 2–2 tie. Manager Bill Moriarty immediately signed Warhop to Freeport with a contract for $80 per month. Warhop was 23–7, pitching 293 innings for Freeport in 1906.

The Freeport Pretzels were the 1907 Wisconsin State League champions. Freeport ended the Wisconsin State League regular season with a record of 79–42. Playing under manager Thomas Schoonhoven, Freeport finished 2½ games ahead of the second place Wausau Lumberjacks in the eight–team league. The league had no playoffs, with the regular season first place team winning the championship. On June 6, 1907, Sylvah Darrah threw Freeport's second franchise no-hitter in a 1–0 victory over the LaCrosse Badgers. Jack Warhop had a 30–6 record, while pitching 325.0 innings for the Pretzels in 1907.

In 1908, Freeport continued play as the Wisconsin State League changed names to become the Wisconsin-Illinois League. The name change occurred after the Rockford Reds joined Freeport as Illinois based teams in the league. The 1908 Freeport Pretzels finished with 57–64 record. The Pretzels placed sixth in the eight–team Wisconsin-Illinois League standings under managers Thomas Schoonhoven and F. Rodemyer, 15.0 games behind the champion Wausau Lumberjacks.

The 1909 Freeport Pretzels played their final season in the Wisconsin-Illinois League and finished in last place in the standings. Freeport ended the 1909 season with a record of 45–79 losses, placing eighth. The 1909 managers were Frank Genins and Edward Leewe, as the Pretzels finished 31½ games behind the first place Madison Senators. Freeport did not return to the league following the 1909 season, replaced by the Aurora, Illinois based Aurora Islanders in 1910.

In 1910, the Freeport Pretzels switched leagues and became charter members of the Class D level Northern Association. Freeport joined the league, playing with fellow league members Clinton Teddies, Decatur Commodores, Elgin Kittens, Jacksonville Jacks, Joliet Jolly-ites, Kankakee Kays, Muscatine Pearl Finders and the Sterling Infants. Freeport disbanded before the season was complete. The Freeport Pretzels had a record of 22–25 when Freeport and the Clinton Teddies franchise both disbanded on June 28, 1910. The league disbanded on July 19. Forrest Plass served as 1910 Freeport manager.

After a four-year span between teams, 1915 saw Freeport host two separate minor league teams during the 1915 season. First, the Freeport Pretzels became charter members of the short–lived Class D Bi-State League, featuring five Illinois teams and the Racine Belles. The Streator Boosters were in first place with a 30–19 record when the Bi–State League permanently folded on July 7, 1915, with Freeport in fifth place. Freeport finished 7½ games behind Streator, with a 24–28–1 record playing under manager Doc Cummings.

On July 14, 1915, Freeport quickly gained a second 1915 team in a new league. The Dubuque Dubs of the Class B level Illinois-Indiana-Iowa League relocated to Freeport with a 26–47 record. The team completed the 1915 season schedule playing as the Freeport "Comeons". The Dubuque/Freeport team finished 48–76 overall, placing sixth tied with the Bloomington Bloomers in the eight–team Illinois-Indiana-Iowa League standings. The Comeons finished 26.0 games behind the first place Moline Plowboys, who lost to the Davenport Blue Sox in the Finals. The 1915 Dubuque/Freeport managers were Larry Mullen, Howard Derringer and the returning Doc Cummings. The team "Comeons" moniker was in reference to the "Come on" battle cry phrase, widely used in baseball at the time.

The Freeport franchise did not return to the 1916 Illinois-Indiana-Iowa League and were the last minor league team based in Freeport, Illinois.

== The ballpark ==
The Freeport minor league teams hosted home games at the Taylor Park ballfield. The ballpark was noted to have been located inside a one–mile racetrack that was within Taylor Park. Taylor Park was originally a privately owned park, containing horse racing and baseball facilities, before being acquired by the city of Freeport in 1911. The 74–acre Taylor Park is still in use today, with three ball fields and other public amenities. Taylor Park is located at 900 East Stephenson Street, Freeport Illinois.

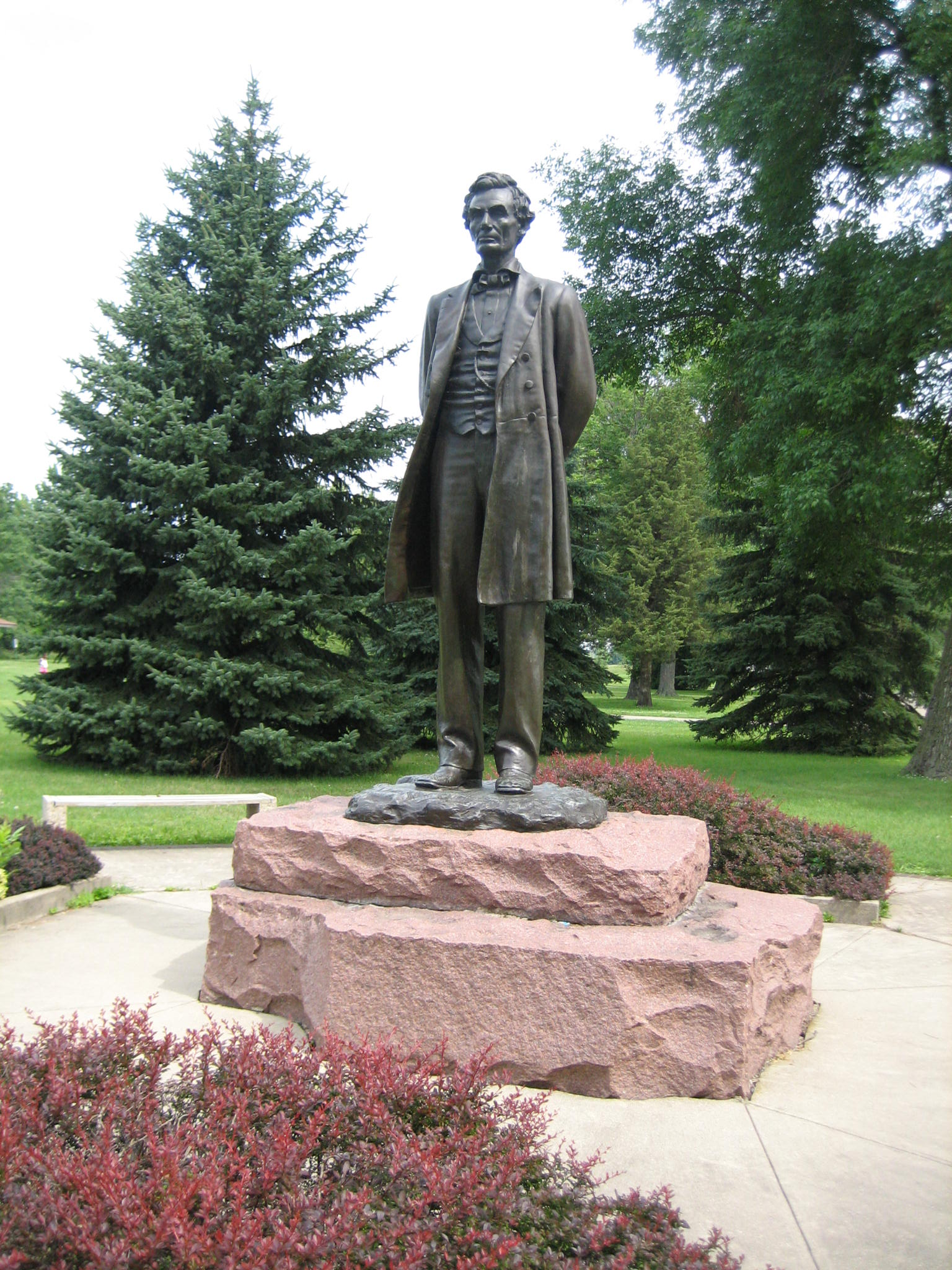
(2007) Lincoln the Debater Statue, Taylor Park. Freeport, Illinois

== Timeline ==
Year(s)	# Yrs.	Team	Level	League	Ballpark
1905–1907	3	Freeport Pretzels	Class D	Wisconsin State League	Taylor Park
1908–1909	2	Freeport Pretzels	Class D	Wisconsin-Illinois League	Taylor Park
1910	1	Freeport Pretzels	Class D	Northern Association	Taylor Park
1915 (1)	1	Freeport Pretzels	Class D	Bi-State League	Taylor Park
1915 (2)	1	Freeport Comeons	Class D	Illinois-Indiana-Iowa League	Taylor Park

== Year-by-year records ==
Year(s)	Record	Place	Manager	Playoffs/Notes
1905	54–56	3rd	Nick Malvern / Bill Moriarty	No playoffs held
1906	73–43	2nd	Bill Moriarty	No playoffs held
1907	79–41	1st	Thomas Schoonhaven	League champions
1908	57–64	6th	Thomas Schoonhaven/F. Rodemeyer	No playoffs held
1909	45–79	8th	Frank Genins	No playoffs held
1910	22–25	NA	Forrest Plass	Team folded June 28
1915 (1)	23–29	5th	Doc Cummings	League folded July 7
1915 (2)	48–76	6th	Larry Mullen / Howard Derringer / Doc Cummings	Dubuque (26–47) moved to Freeport July 14

== Notable alumni ==
- Davey Crockett (1908)
- Cliff Daringer (1915)
- George Disch (1907–1908)
- Harry Gaspar (1907)
- Frank Genins (1909, MGR)
- Billy Kelly (1910)
- Fred Lamlein (1915)
- Lou Lowdermilk (1910)
- Fred Luderus (1909)
- Willie McGill (1905)
- Bill Moriarty (1905–1906, MGR)
- Walter Mueller (1915)
- Offa Neal (1910)
- Frank Schneiberg (1905)
- Shag Shaughnessy (1907)
- John Skopec (1906)
- Jack Warhop (1906–1907)
- Ducky Yount (1909)

== See also ==
- Freeport Pretzels players
