= Northern Association =

- Classification: Class D (1910)
- Sport: Minor League Baseball
- First season: 1910
- Folded: July 19, 1910
- President: C.A. Burton (1910)
- No. of teams: 8
- Country: United States of America
- Most titles: 1 Elgin Kittens (1910)
- Related competitions: Bi-State League

The Northern Association was a Class D level minor league baseball league. The eight-team league had franchises based in Illinois and Iowa. The league began and ended play in 1910, disbanding on July 19, 1910. The Joliet Jolly-ites moved to Sterling on June 21. The Clinton and Freeport teams disbanded on June 28; The Elgin and Kankakee franchises disbanded on July 11.

Baseball Hall of Fame member Casey Stengel and Fritz Maisel were two league players who reached Major League Baseball after playing in the Northern Association.

== Cities represented ==
- Clinton, Iowa: Clinton Teddies 1910
- Decatur, Illinois: Decatur Commodores 1910
- Elgin, Illinois: Elgin Kittens 1910
- Freeport, Illinois: Freeport Pretzels 1910
- Jacksonville, Illinois: Jacksonville Jacks 1910
- Joliet, Illinois: Joliet Jolly-ites 1910
- Kankakee, Illinois: Kankakee Kays 1910
- Muscatine, Iowa: Muscatine Pearl Finders 1910
- Sterling, Illinois: Sterling Infants 1910

== Standings & statistics ==
1910 Northern Association

| Team standings | W | L | PCT | GB | Managers |
|---|---|---|---|---|---|
| Elgin Kittens (Note: Elgin and Kankakee disbanded July 11.) | 37 | 20 | .649 | - | Mal Kittridge |
| Muscatine Pearl Finders | 37 | 21 | .638 | ½ | Lou Walters |
| Kankakee Kays | 34 | 24 | .586 | 3½ | Dan Collins |
| Jacksonville Jacks | 32 | 31 | .508 | 8 | Pants Rowland |
| Decatur Commodores | 30 | 32 | .484 | 9½ | Del Williams / Charles O'Day / McGrew |
| Joliet Jolly-ites / Sterling Infants (Note: Joliet (21-18) moved to Sterling June 21.) | 24 | 34 | .414 | 13½ | Hunkey Hines |
| Freeport Pretzels (Note: Freeport and Clinton disbanded June 28.) | 22 | 25 | .468 | NA | Forrest Plass |
| Clinton Teddies | 10 | 39 | .204 | NA | Ted Sullivan / John Marmen |

The league disbanded July 19.

Player statistics
| Player | Team | Stat | Tot | Player | Team | Stat | Tot |
|---|---|---|---|---|---|---|---|
| Phil Nadeau | Joliet/Sterling | BA | .333 | Pop Eyler | Muscatine | W | 11 |
| Fritz Maisel | Elgin | Runs | 49 | Thomas McTigue | Kankakee | W | 11 |
| Harmony Van Dine | Jacksonville | Hits | 80 | Archie Hickman | Joliet/Sterling | W | 11 |
| Buck Hopkins | Elgin | HR | 7 | Thomas McTigue | Kankakee | Pct | .786; 11-3 |
