= Elgin Watch Makers =

- 1915; (1910, 1915); Elgin, Illinois

Minor league affiliations
- Class: Class D (1910, 1915)
- League: Northern Association (1910); Bi-State League (1915)

Major league affiliations
- Team: None

Minor league titles
- League titles (1): 1910

Team data
- Name: Elgin Kittens (1910); Elgin Watch Makers (1915)
- Ballpark: Trout Park (1910, 1915)

The Elgin Watch Makers were a minor league baseball team based in Elgin, Illinois in 1915. Elgin teams played as members of the Class D level Northern Association in 1910 and Bi-State League in 1915, winning the 1910 league championship. Elgin played as the Elgin "Kittens" in 1910 in a shortened season, with the nickname being a tribute to manager Mal Kittridge. The Elgin minor league teams hosted home games at Trout Park.

== History ==
=== 1910: Northern Association championship ===
Minor league baseball began with the 1910 Elgin Kittens, who played as charter members of the eight–team Class D level Northern Association, which folded during the 1910 season. Elgin joined the Clinton Teddies, Decatur Commodores, Freeport Pretzels, Jacksonville Jacks, Joliet Jolly-ites, Kankakee Kays and Muscatine Pearl Finders in beginning league play on May 10, 1910.

Elgin ended the 1910 shortened season with the best record in the Northern Association.

Elgin pitchers threw two no-hitters during the 1910 season, occurring just weeks apart in May, with both against the Freeport Pretzels. On May 13, 1910, Cy Boothby of Elgin threw the first franchise no–hitter, defeating Freeport 7–2. On May 30, 1910, Earl Wilson threw a no–hitter in defeating the Pretzels 3–0.

The Northern Association folded on July 17, 1910. At the time the league folded, the Kittens had a record of 37–20, finishing first in the standings under player/manager Mal Kittridge. Kittridge was a former player of the nearby Chicago Cubs and was the namesake of the "Kittens" nickname. Elgin had folded on July 11, 1910, on the same day as the Kankee Kays, contributing to the demise of the league. Playing home games at Trout Park, Elgin finished 0.5 game ahead of the second place Muscatine Pearl Finders in the final standings. Fritz Maisel of Elgin led the Northern Association in runs scored with 49 and teammate Buck Hopkins led the league with 7 home runs. The Northern Association did not return to play in 1911.

=== 1915: Bi-State League ===
In 1915 Elgin resumed minor league play when the Elgin "Watch Makers" became charter members of the Bi-State League, which formed as a Class D level league. Elgin began the 1915 season playing with the Aurora Foxes, Freeport Pretzels, Ottawa Indians, Racine Belles and Streator Boosters in the six–team league. The league began play on May 11, 1915.

The use of the "Watch Makers" moniker was in reference to local industry in the era. Elgin, Illinois was home to the Elgin National Watch Company, which was founded in 1863.

The Bi–State League permanently folded on July 7, 1915, during its first season of play. The Watch Makers had a 27–26 record and were in third place in the Bi–State League standings when the league folded. Denny Blake served as manager, as Elgin finished 5.5 games behind the first place Streator Boosters in the final standings. Streator was followed by the Racine Belles (30–20), Elgin Watch Makers (27–26), Aurora Foxes (25–27), Freeport Pretzels (23–29), and Ottawa Indians (20–35) in the standings.

The Bi-State League did not return to play in 1916. Elgin, Illinois has not hosted another minor league team.

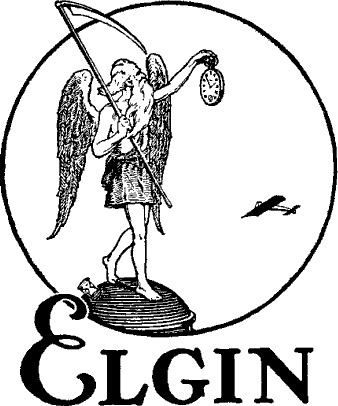
(1914) Elgin National Watch Company Father Time

== The ballpark ==
The Elgin minor league teams reportedly played home games at Trout Park. Today, Trout Park is still in use as a public park with ballfields. It is located at 576 Trout Park Boulevard, Elgin, Illinois.

== Timeline ==
Year(s)	# Yrs.	Team	Level	League	Ballpark
1910	1	Elgin Kittens	Class D	Northern Association	Trout Park
1915	1	Elgin Watch Makers	Class D	Bi-State League	Trout Park

== Year–by–year records ==
Year(s)	Record	Place	Managers	Playoffs/Notes
1910	37–20	1st	Malachi Kittridge	Team folded July 11; League folded July 17; League champions
1915	27–26	3rd	Denny Blake	League folded July 7

== Notable alumni ==
- Bill Burwell (1915)
- Malachi Kittridge (1910, MGR)
- Fritz Maisel (1910) Set MLB record with 74 stolen bases
- Ray Mowe (1910)

== See also ==
- Elgin Kittens players
- Elgin Watch Makers players
