= Bruce Evans =

Bruce Evans may refer to:

- Bruce Evans (baseball), American baseball player
- Bruce Evans (politician) (1925–2012), Australian politician
- Bruce Evans (bishop) (1929–1993), Anglican bishop and author
- Bruce A. Evans (born 1946), American film director
- Bruce R. Evans (born c. 1959), American venture capitalist, corporate director and philanthropist
