= Jacksonville, Illinois, minor league baseball history =

Jacksonville, Illinois minor league baseball teams
- 1892–1910; (1892, 1894–1895, 1900, 1906–1910); Jacksonville, Illinois

Minor league affiliations
- Class: Class F (1892); Class A (1894); Class B (1895); Independent (1900); Class D (1906–1910)
- League: Illinois–Iowa League (1892); Western Association (1894–1895); Central League (1900); Kentucky–Illinois–Tennessee League (1906); Iowa State League (1907); Central Association (1908–1909); Northern Association (1910); Illinois–Missouri League (1910)

Major league affiliations
- Team: None

Minor league titles
- League titles (0): None

Team data
- Name: Jacksonville Lunatics (1892); Jacksonville Jacks (1894–1985); Jacksonville Reds (1900); Jacksonville Jacks (1906); Jacksonville Lunatics (1907–1908); Jacksonville Braves (1909); Jacksonville Jacks (1910)
- Ballpark: League Park (1892, 1894–1895, 1900, 1906–1910)

Minor league baseball teams were based in Jacksonville, Illinois, playing in eight leagues under four nicknames in their seasons of play between 1892 and 1910. Jacksonville teams played as members of the 1892 Illinois–Iowa League, Western Association (1894–1895), 1900 Central League, 1906 Kentucky–Illinois–Tennessee League, 1907 Iowa State League, Central Association (1908–1909), 1910 Northern Association and 1910 Illinois–Missouri League. Jacksonville teams hosted minor league home games exclusively at League Park.

== History ==
Organized early baseball began in Jacksonville in 1865 with the semi–pro Jacksonville Hardins. The Hardins were a semi–pro team assembled by Illinois College student Linus Chandler.

In 1892, minor league baseball began, as the Jacksonville Lunatics joined the eight–team 1892 Illinois–Iowa League. The Lunatics finished with a 30–57 record to place 4th in the league standings as four of the league members folded during the season. Only Jacksonville, the Joliet Convicts, Rockford Hustlers and Rock Island-Moline Twins competed the season as Jacksonville finished 27.0 games behind first place Joilet. The Illinois–Iowa League folded after the season.

In 1894, the Jacksonville Jacks joined the reformed Western Association. The Des Moines Prohibitionists, Lincoln Treeplanters, Omaha Omahogs, Peoria Distillers, Quincy Ravens, Rock Island-Moline Islanders and St. Joseph Saints joined Jacksonville in league play.

Jacksonville finished with a 67–57 record in 1894, placing fourth in the standings, finishing 6.0 games behind the first place Rock Island-Moline Islanders, playing the season under manager Con Strothers. Joe Strauss of Jacksonville led the league with 33 home runs. The Jacksonville Jacks continued play in 1895 and had a record of 33–36 on August 8, 1895, when the franchise moved to nearby Springfield, Illinois. The franchise then moved to Burlington, Iowa and finished the 1895 season as the Burlington Spiders.

In 1900, Jacksonville briefly played as the Jacksonville Reds in the Central League. On May 21, 1900, the nearby Springfield Reds had a record of 4–14 when the franchise moved to Jacksonville. On July 8, 1900, the Jacksonville Reds had an overall record of 15–43 when the team folded.

The 1906 Jacksonville Jacks returned the city to minor league play, when the team became members of the six–team Class D level Kentucky–Illinois–Tennessee League. The Jacks finished the season in second place, playing under manager Frank Belt. Jacksonville ended the season with a 67–58 record, finishing 9.0 games behind the first place Vincennes Alices in the final standings. The Kentucky–Illinois–Tennessee League folded after the 1906 season.

With the Kentucky–Illinois–Tennessee League folded, the Jacksonville Lunatics joined the eight–team 1907 Iowa State League. The Lunatics placed fourth in the standings with a 63–61 record, ending the season 16.0 games behind the first place Waterloo Cubs. Frank Belt continued as Jacksonville manager. On September 11, 1907, Jacksonville pitcher John Roach threw a 7–inning no–hitter against the Ottumwa Packers in a 2–0 Jacksonville victory.

After the Iowa State League changed names, the Jackson Lunatics played 1908 as charter members of the newly named Central Association. The Burlington Pathfinders, Keokuk Indians, Kewanee Boilermakers, Oskaloosa Quakers, Ottumwa Packers, Quincy Gems and Waterloo Lulus joined Jacksonville in league play. The Lunatics finished with a record of 59–69 and ended the season in fifth place in the 1908 Central Association standings. Jacksonville finished 32.0 games behind first place Waterloo, playing under manager Harry Berte. On June 27, 1908, Jacksonville pitcher A.J. Patrick pitched a no–hitter against the Ottumwa Packers in a 4–1 Jacksonville victory.

Jacksonville continued play in the 1909 Central Association, playing as the Jacksonville Braves. The Braves were led by returning manager Harry Berte in 1909. Jacksonville finished with a record of 46–84, to place seventh in the Central Association final standings.

In 1910, the Galesburg Pavers replaced Jacksonville in the Central Association and Jacksonville played 1910 in two other leagues.

The 1910 Jacksonville Jacks began the season as founding members of the Class D level Northern Association. The Clinton Teddies, Decatur Commodores, Elgin Kittens, Freeport Pretzels, Joliet Jolly-ites, Kankakee Kays and Muscatine Pearl Finders joined Jacksonville as charter members.

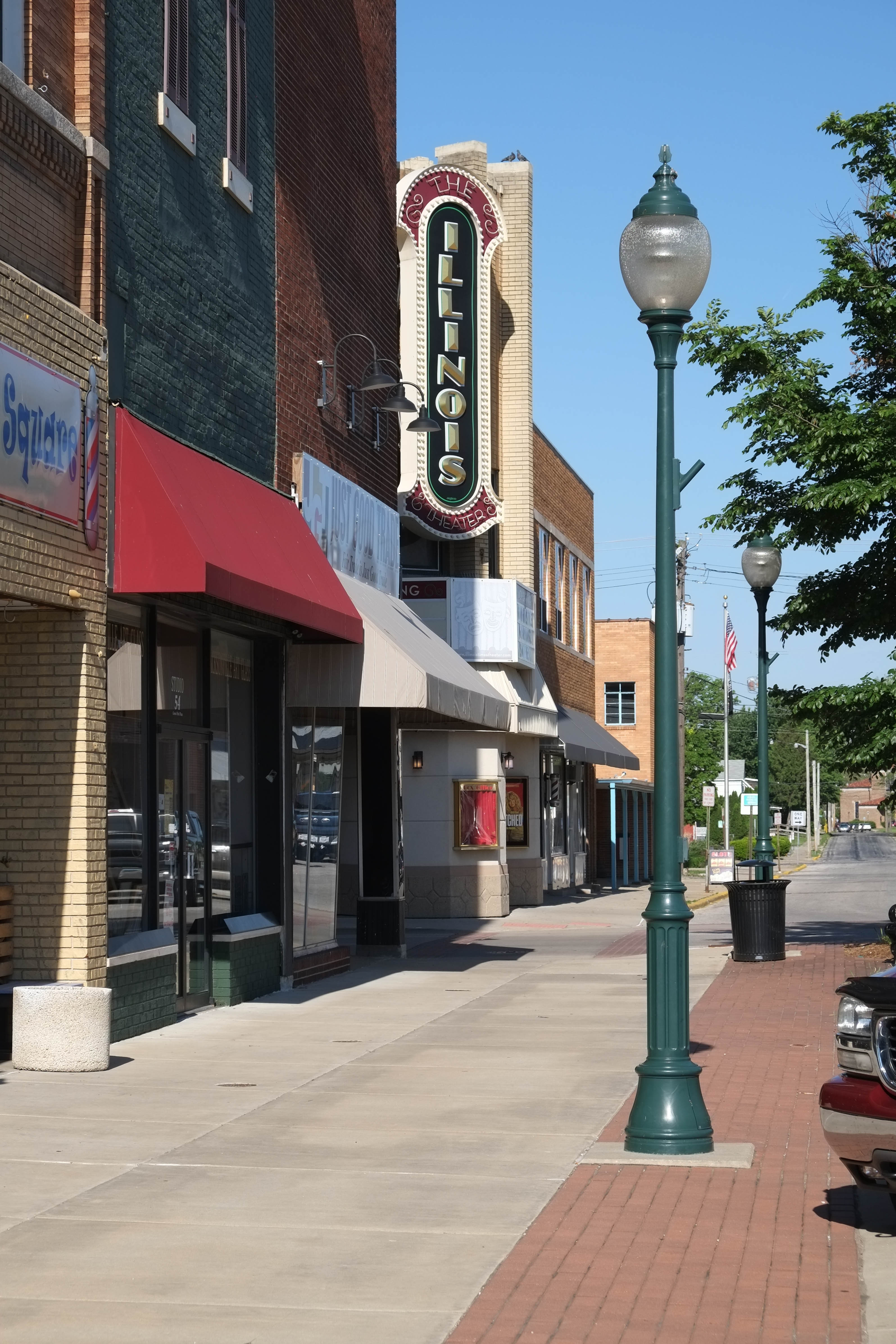
(2017) Jacksonville, Illinois

On May 10, 1910, Baseball Hall of Fame inductee Casey Stengel made his professional debut playing for the Kankakee Kays against the Jacksonville Jacks. The Jacks won 3–2, while Stengel had a hit and stolen base.

On July 19, 1910, the Jacksonville Jacks had a record of 32–31 playing under manager Pants Rowland, when the Northern Association permanently folded. The Freeport, Clinton, Elgin and Kankakee franchises had already folded.

Jacksonville quickly resumed play in 1910, gaining a new team in two days. On July 21, 1910, the Beardstown Infants franchise of the Illinois–Missouri League moved the team to Jacksonville with a 38–26 record. The Jacksonville Jacks resumed play and were 44–36 in the Illinois–Missouri League under managers Jack Corbett and Pants Rowland when the franchise folded again on August 17, 1910.

Minor league baseball has not returned to Jacksonville, Illinois.

== The ballpark ==
Jacksonville minor league teams were referenced to have played home games at League Park. League Park had a capacity of 1,200. The ballpark was located on Finley Street, Jacksonville, Illinois.

== Timeline ==
Year(s)	# Yrs.	Team	Level	League	Ballpark
1892	1	Jacksonville Lunatics	Class F	Illinois–Iowa League	League Park
1894	1	Jacksonville Jacks	Class A	Western Association	League Park
1895	1	Jacksonville Jacks	Class B	Western Association	League Park
1900	1	Jacksonville Reds	Independent	Central League	League Park
1906	1	Jacksonville Jacks	Class D	Kentucky–Illinois–Tennessee League	League Park
1907	1	Jacksonville Lunatics	Class D	Iowa State League	League Park
1908	1	Jacksonville Lunatics	Class D	Central Association	League Park
1909	1	Jacksonville Braves	Class D	Central Association	League Park
1910 (1)	1	Jacksonville Jacks	Class D	Northern Association	League Park
1910 (2)	1	Jacksonville Jacks	Class D	Illinois-Missouri League	League Park

== Notable alumni ==
- Jerry Akers (1906–1909)
- Mack Allison (1907)
- Harry Berte (1906–1907), (1908–1909, MGR)
- Grant Briggs (1892)
- Lew Camp (1892)
- Nick Carter (1900)
- Bob Caruthers (1895)
- Dad Clarke (1892)
- Frank Donnelly (1895, MGR)
- Jim Hackett (1900, MGR) (1906)
- Guy Hecker (1892)
- Charlie Hoover (1894)
- Hi Jasper (1909-1910)
- Ralph Kreitz (1910)
- Michael McDermott (1892)
- Paul Meloan (1908)
- Kid Mohler (1892) Pacific Coast League Hall of Fame
- Gene Moriarty (1892)
- Charlie Newman (1894)
- Billy O'Brien (1895) NL HR Leader
- Doc Parker (1895)
- Toad Ramsey (1892)
- John Roach (1907)
- Pants Rowland (1910, MGR) Manager: 1917 World Series Champion Chicago White Sox
- Jud Smith (1894)
- Cooney Snyder (1894)
- Bill Sowders (1892)
- Joe Strauss (1894)
- Bill Van Dyke (1895)

== See also ==
- Jacksonville Jacks players
- Jacksonville Lunatics players
- Jacksonville Braves players
