= Muscatine, Iowa minor league baseball history =

Muscatine, Iowa minor league baseball teams
- 1910–1916; Muscatine, Iowa

Minor league affiliations
- Class: Class D (1910–1916)
- League: Northern Association (1910); Central Association (1911–1916)

Major league affiliations
- Team: None

Minor league titles
- League titles (0): None

Team data
- Name: Muscatine Pearl Finders (1910); Muscatine Camels (1911); Muscatine Wallopers (1912–1913); Muscatine Buttonmakers (1914); Muscatine Muskies (1915–1916)
- Ballpark: League Field (1910–1916)

Minor league baseball teams were based in Muscatine, Iowa from 1910 to 1916, playing under five different nicknames. Muscatine teams played as members of the 1910 Northern Association and Central Association from 1911 to 1916. Muscatine teams hosted home games at League Field.

Baseball Hall of Fame inductee Sam Rice played for the 1912 Muscatine Wallopers.

== History ==
Minor league baseball began in Muscatine, Iowa when the 1910 Muscatine Pearl Finders became charter members of the Class D level Northern Association. The Muscatine Pearl Finders formed the Northern Association along with the Clinton Teddies, Decatur Commodores, Elgin Kittens, Freeport Pretzels, Jacksonville Jacks, Joliet Jolly-ites and Kankakee Kays as fellow charter members, beginning league play on May 10, 1910.

In their first season of play, the Muscatine Pearl Finders finished in second place as the Northern Association folded during the 1910 season. On July 19, 1910, Muscatine was in second place with a 37–21 record under manager Lou "Roxey" Walters when the Northern Association permanently folded. However, first place Elgin had folded on July 11, 1910, along with the Kanakee Kays.

In 1911, Muscatine became members of the Class D level Central Association, replacing the Quincy Vets in the league. They remained in the league through the 1916 season playing as the Muscatine Camels in 1911, Muscatine Wallopers in 1912 and 1913, Muscatine Buttonmakers in 1914 and Muscatine Muskies in 1915 and 1916.

The 1911 Muscatine Camels placed seventh in the eight–team Central Association. Muscatine finished with a 48–80 record, in the final regular season standings under managers Ed Coleman and Lou Walters. The Camels finished the 1911 season 39.0 games behind the first place Ottumwa Speedboys. Other 1911 Central Association members were the Burlington Cow Boys, Galesburg Pavers, Hannibal Cannibals, Keokuk Indians, Kewanee Boilermakers and Monmouth Browns.

Continuing league play, the 1912 Muscatine Wallopers finished in eighth place, last in the eight–team Central Association. With a final record of 33–94 playing under managers Ed Coleman, Bill Kreig, Joe Wall and William Clayton, Muscatine finished 45.0 games behind the first place Ottawa Speedboys in the final standings. Muscatine had total season home attendance of 22,000.

Baseball Hall of Fame inductee Sam Rice played for the 1912 Muscatine Wallopers, hitting .194 in 62 at bats. Rice's wife, two children, both of his parents and two sisters were killed by a tornado on April 21, 1912. Rice had begun the season with the Galesburg Pavers, but left the team after the tragedy.

The 1913 Muscatine Wallopers finished second in the Central Association. With a 68–54 record under manager Frank Boyle, Muscatine finished 2.0 games behind the Ottumwa Packers in the final standings.

On June 2, 1913, Muscatine Wallopers hosted an exhibition game against the Chicago Cubs. There were 3,000 in attendance at League Field in Muscatine for the exhibition game.

Continuing play in the Central Association, the 1914 Muscatine Buttonmakers placed third in the Central Association with a record of 72–53. Playing under returning manager Frank Boyle, the Buttonmakers finished 4.0 games behind the first place Waterloo Jays in the final eight–team standings. The "Buttonmakers" moniker was a reference to buttonmakers, a Muscatine industry, which had a local strike in 1911 and 1912.

On June 26, 1914, Al Gould of the Muscatine Buttonmakers threw a no-hitter against the Cedar Rapids Bunnies as Muscatine won the game 7–0.

The Muscatine Muskies finished second in the 1915 Central Association standings. With a 63–57 record under managers Ned Egan and Jesse Runser, the Muskies finished 18.0 games behind the first place Burlington Pathfinders in the final standings.

On May 26, 1915, Muscatine Muskies pitcher Sidney Ross threw a no–hitter in a 5–0 win over the Cedar Rapids Rabbits.

The "Muskies" moniker was in reference to the Mascouten tribe which the city was reportedly named after.

In their final season, the 1916 Muscatine Muskies played the season amid controversy. While the Muskies finished in third place with a 45–44 record under manager Ned Egan, but the franchise forfeited 34 of the wins after the season was concluded. The Muscatine franchise did not return to the 1917 Central Association and the league folded after the 1917 season. Muscatine, Iowa has not hosted another minor league franchise.

The current Muscatine High School building opened in 1974 and adopted the Muscatine Muskies moniker.

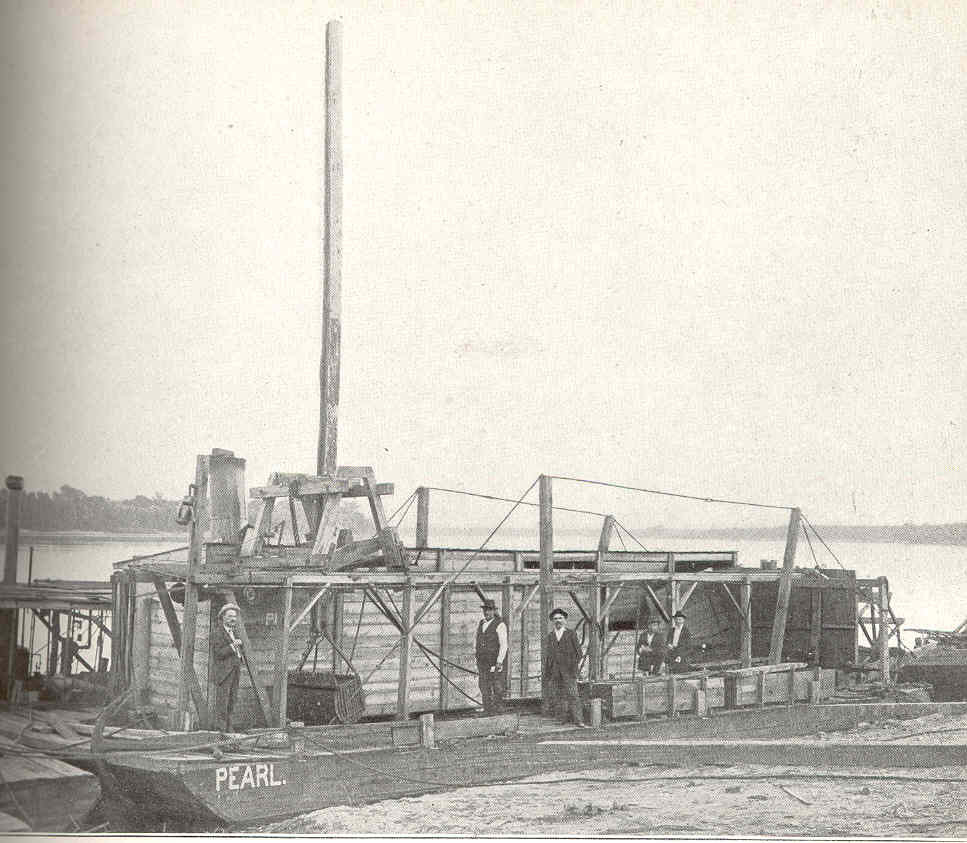
Steam Dredge, specially constructed for the Mussel Fishery, Muscatine, Iowa

== The ballpark ==
Muscatine minor league team played home games at League Field. League Field was constructed in 1910 for the Muscatine Pearl Finders. When the ballpark was first built, legend held that with no money for a lawn mower, cows were used to keep the grass trimmed. The ballpark is still in use today and known as Tom Bruner Field, named to honor a Muscatine High School teacher. Today, the park is home to Muscatine Community College and Muscatine High School baseball teams.

Today, Tom Bruner Field sits within Kent Stein Park. It is located at 2136 Oneida Avenue, Muscatine, Iowa.

== Timeline ==
Year(s)	# Yrs.	Team	Level	League	Ballpark
1910	1	Muscatine Pearl Finders	Class D	Northern Association	League Field (Tom Bruner Field)
1911	1	Muscatine Camels	Class D	Central Association	League Field (Tom Bruner Field)
1912–1913	2	Muscatine Wallopers	Class D	Central Association	League Field (Tom Bruner Field)
1914	1	Muscatine Buttonmakers	Class D	Central Association	League Field (Tom Bruner Field)
1915–1916	2	Muscatine Muskies	Class D	Central Association	League Field (Tom Bruner Field)

== Year–by–year records ==
Year	Record	Finish	Manager	Playoffs / notes
1910	37–21	2nd	Lou Walters	League folded July 11
1911	40–80	7th	Ed Coleman / Lou Walters	No playoffs held
1912	33–94	8th	Coleman / Bill Kreig / Joe Wall / William Clayton	No playoffs held
1913	68–54	2nd	Frank Boyle	No playoffs held
1914	72–53	3rd	Frank Boyle	No playoffs held
1915	63–57	2nd	Ned Egan /Jesse Runser	No playoffs held
1916	45–44	3rd	Ned Egan	No playoffs held Team forfeited 34 wins

== Notable alumni ==
- Sam Rice (1912) Inducted Baseball Hall of Fame, 1963
- Dan Adams (1911)
- Babe Ellison (1916)
- Rags Faircloth (1914)
- Frank Fletcher (1912)
- Frank Foutz (1910)
- Al Gould (1913–1914)
- Ziggy Hasbrook (1913–1916)
- Cliff Lee (1914–1915)
- Ralph McConnaughey (1913)
- Doc Shanley (1915)
- Cy Slapnicka (1910–1911)
- Joe Wall (1912, MGR)
- George Zackert (1913–1915)

== See also ==
- Muscatine Buttonmakers players
- Muscatine Camels players
- Muscatine Muskies players
- Muscatine Wallopers players
