= Sterling Infants =

- 1890–1910; (1890, 1910); Sterling, Illinois

Minor league affiliations
- Class: Independent (1890); Class D (1910)
- League: Illinois-Iowa League (1890); Northern Association (1910)

Major league affiliations
- Team: None

Minor league titles
- League titles: None

Team data
- Name: Sterling Blue Coats (1890); Sterling Infants (1910)
- Ballpark: Sporting Association Grounds (1890, 1910)

The Sterling Infants were a minor league baseball team based in Sterling, Illinois. In 1910, the Sterling Infants played as members of the Class D level Northern Association. Previously, the 1890 Sterling Blue Coats were briefly members of the 1890 Illinois-Iowa League. Both teams played a partial season in their leagues and hosted minor league home games at the Sporting Association Grounds.

Baseball Hall of Fame member Bud Fowler played for the 1890 Sterling Blue Coats, integrating the team and the Illinois–Iowa League.

== History ==
Minor league baseball began in Sterling, Illinois when the 1890 Sterling Blue Coats became members of the 1890 Independent level Illinois-Iowa League. After Sterling began play in the eight–team league, the Blue Coats had a record of 21–51 on July 31, 1890 when the franchise moved to nearby Galesburg, Illinois. On September 4, 1890, the Galesburg Pavers, after compiling an 8–17 record in Galesburg, moved again to Burlington, Iowa to become the Burlington Hawkeyes. In Burlington, the franchise disbanded on September 10, 1890.

The 1890 Sterling/Galesburg/Burlington team finished with a 30–72 overall record when they disbanded. The team was in eighth place in the Illinois-Iowa League standings, finishing 33.5 games behind the first place Ottumwa Coal Palace Kings (63–43). Baseball Hall of Fame member Bud Fowler played for the Sterling/Galesburg/Burlington team in 1890, hitting.322 for the season.

Baseball Hall of Fame member Bud Fowler played for the Sterling/Galesburg/Burlington team. Fowler was the first known African-American to play professional baseball, becoming a pioneer for baseball players. Fowler hit .322 for the season. Playing for the Sterling/Galesburg/Burlington team in 1890, Fowler hit .322 for the season.

In 1910, minor league baseball returned to Sterling during the season. On June 21, 1910, the Joliet Jolly-ites of the Class D level Northern Association relocated to Sterling with a 21–18 record. The Sterling "Infants" played the remainder of the season, having a 3–16 record in Sterling to finish with a 24–34 overall record. The Joliet Jolly-ites/Sterling Infants placed sixth in the Northern Association standings, playing the season under manager Hunkey Hines. The Northern League permanently disbanded on July 19, 1910.

Sterling, Illinois has not hosted another minor league team.

== The ballpark ==
The Sterling Blue Coats and Sterling Infants played home minor league games at the Sporting Association Grounds in Sterling, Illinois. The location of the Sterling Association Grounds ballpark is not known.

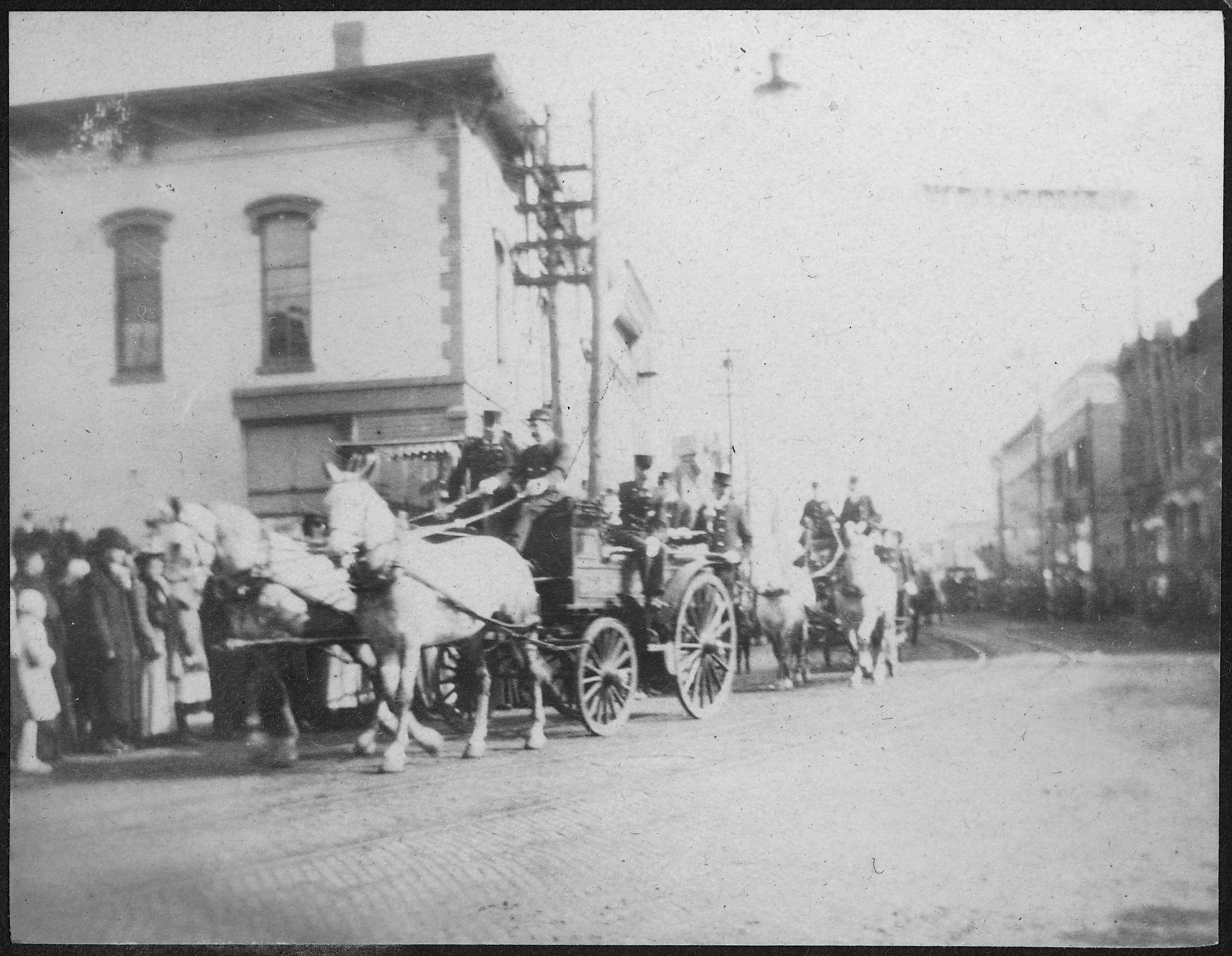
(1907) Parade. Sterling, Illinois

== Timeline ==
Year(s)	# Yrs.	Team	Level	League	Ballpark
1890	1	Sterling Blue Coats	Independent	Illinois-Iowa League	Sporting Association Grounds
1910	1	Sterling Infants	Class D	Northern Association	Sporting Association Grounds

== Year–by–year records ==
Year	Record	Finish	Manager	Playoffs/Notes
1890	30–72	8th	James Donnelly/Charles Wirsche; Al Weddige/Clarence	Moved to Galesburg/Burlington
1910	24–34	6th	Hunkey Hines	Joliet (21–18) moved to Sterling June 21

== Notable alumni ==
- Bud Fowler (1890) Inducted Baseball Hall of Fame, 2021
- Varney Anderson (1890)
- Fritz Clausen (1890)
- James Donnelly (1890, MGR)
- Hunkey Hines (1910, MGR)
- Jack Scheible (1890)

== See also ==
Sterling (minor league baseball) players
