= Kewanee Boilermakers =

- 1908–1913; Kewanee, Illinois

Minor league affiliations
- Class: Class D (1908–1913)
- League: Central Association (1908–1913)

Major league affiliations
- Team: None

Minor league titles
- League titles (0): None

Team data
- Name: Kewanee Boilermakers (1908–1913)
- Ballpark: Terminal Park (1908–1913)

The Kewanee Boilermakers were a minor league baseball team based in Kewanee, Illinois. From 1908 to 1913, the Boilermakers played exclusively as members of the Central Association, hosting home games at Terminal Park. The 1948 Kewanee A's succeeded the Boilermakers in minor league play.

The Boilermakers moniker was adopted and still in use by Kewanee High School.

== History ==
Minor league baseball began in Kewanee, Illinois when the 1908 Kewanee "Boilermakers" became charter members of the Class D level Central Association, with Kewanee fielding a minor league baseball team for the first time. Kewanee was joined by the Burlington Pathfinders, Keokuk Indians, Jacksonville Lunatics, Oskaloosa Quakers, Ottumwa Packers, Quincy Gems and the Waterloo Lulus as charter members in the eight–team league, beginning league play on May 7, 1908.

The Kewanee use of the "Boilermakers" moniker corresponds to local industry. The local Kewanee Boiler Company, was a large manufacturing factory in Kewanee.

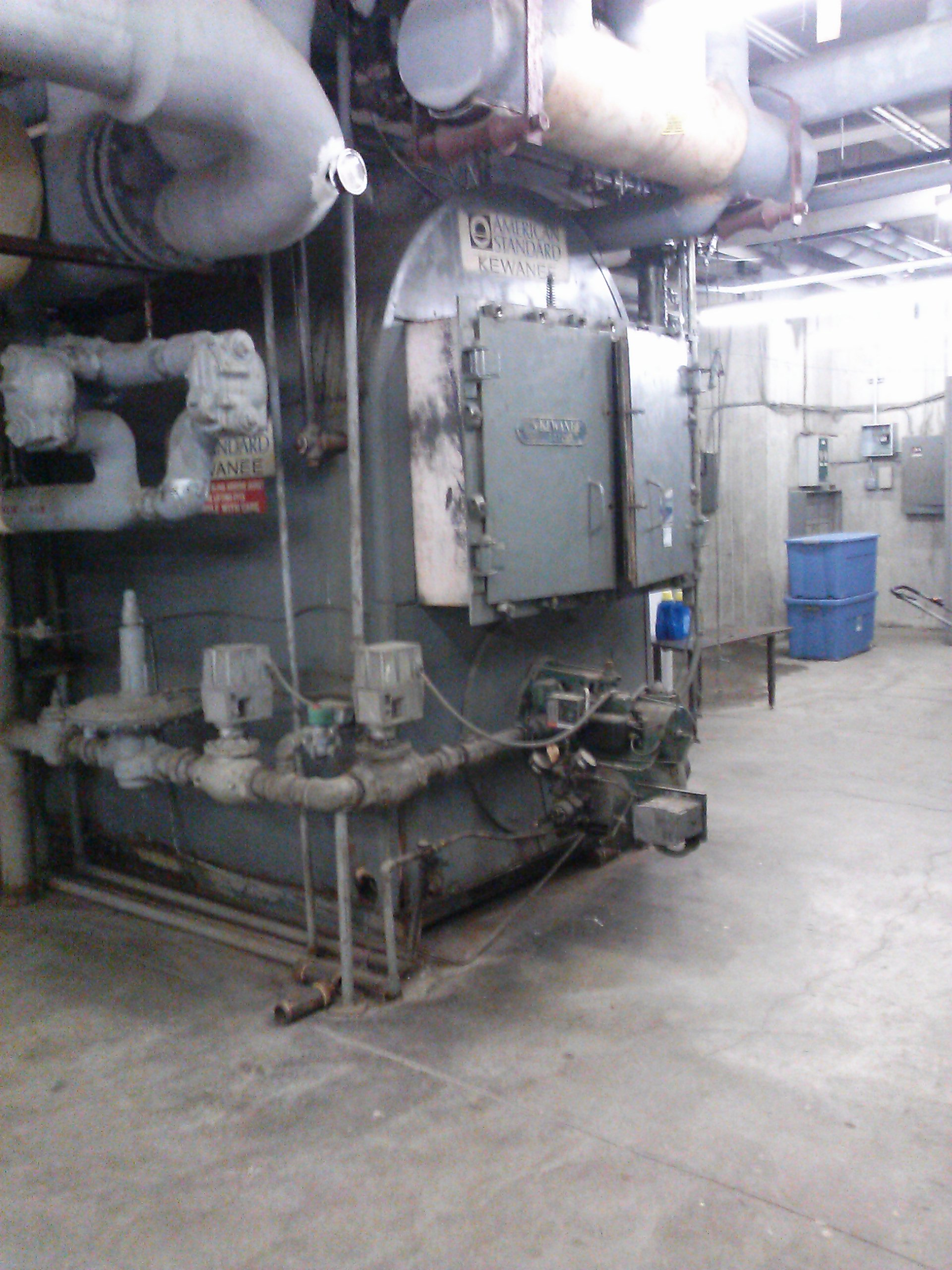
Kewanee Boiler

Playing in the 1908 Central Association, Kewanee ended the season with a record of 48–79, placing seventh in the Central Association standings.

The 1909 Boilermakers finished with a 73–61 record, placing fourth in the final standings. The 1910 Kewanee team finished eighth and last with a 43–91 record. The 1911 Boilermakers finished in fifth place with a record of 59–67. The Central Association did not have playoffs during those seasons.

On May 20, 1911, Kewanee's John Beltz pitched a no–hitter vs. the Muscatine Camels. Kewanee won the game 6–0. Kewanee had a second no–hitter on August 29, 1912, when Tom Drohan threw a no–hitter against the Hannibal Cannibals in a 4–0 Kewanee victory.

The 1912 Kewanee Boilermakers finished second in the eight–team Central Association with a 74–51 record, finishing 3.5 games behind the first place Streator Speedboys. Kewanee had 1912 season attendance of 19,000.

In 1913, Kewanee placed seventh in the Central Association standings, finishing 6.5 games behind the first place Ottumwa Packers with a 59–65 record. The Kewanee Boilermakers folded following the 1913 season, along with the Monmouth Browns. The two new teams to replace them in the 1914 Central Association were the Clinton Pilots and Marshalltown Ansons. The Central Association eventually folded after the 1917 season, before being reformed in 1947.

Kewanee High School adopted the "Boilermakers" moniker in 1927 and continue play as the Kewanee Boilermakers today.

After folding in 1913, Kewanee was without minor league baseball for 35 years. On June 18, 1948, the Moline A's of the Central Association moved from Moline, Illinois to Kewanee and became the Kewanee A's, who played in 1948 and 1949.

== The ballpark ==
From 1908 to 1913, the Kewanee Boilermakers played minor league home games at Terminal Park. Terminal Park was also home to the Kewanee Regulars football club. Terminal Park was located on Lake Street in Kewanee, Illinois.

== Timeline ==
Year(s)	# Yrs.	Team	Level	League	Ballpark
1908–1913	6	Kewanee Boilermakers	Class D	Central Association	Terminal Park

== Year–by–year records ==
Year	Record	Finish	Manager	Playoffs
1908	48–79	7th	Harry Busse / Andy Steveson / William Connors	No playoffs held
1909	73–61	4th	William Connors	No playoffs held
1910	49–91	8th	William Connors / Ted Price	No playoffs held
1911	59–67	5th	Jay Andrews	No playoffs held
1912	74-51	2nd	George Pennington / Art Queisser	No playoffs held

== Notable alumni ==
- Marty Berghammer (1911)
- Coonie Blank (1908)
- Hick Cady (1908)
- Dave Callahan (1908–1909)
- Al Demaree (1908)
- Tom Drohan (1911–1913)
- Rowdy Elliott (1908–1909)
- Fred House (1912)
- Jimmy Johnston (1908–1909)
- Frank Lobert (1910)
- Art Phelan (1909)
- Claude Thomas (1910)
- Lon Ury (1910)
- Johnny Wanner (1911)

== See also ==
- Kewanee Boilermakers players
