= Chappie McFarland =

American baseball player (1875–1924)

- Pitcher
- Born: March 13, 1875; White Hall, Illinois, U.S.
- Died: December 14, 1924 (aged 49); Houston, Texas, U.S.
- Batted: Unknown Threw: Right

MLB debut
- September 15, 1902, for the St. Louis Cardinals

Last MLB appearance
- August 7, 1906, for the Brooklyn Superbas

MLB statistics
- Win–loss record: 34-61
- Earned run average: 3.35
- Strikeouts: 307
- Stats at Baseball Reference

Teams
- St. Louis Cardinals (1902–1906); Pittsburgh Pirates (1906); Brooklyn Superbas (1906)

Charles Amos McFarland (March 13, 1875 – December 14, 1924) was an American pitcher in Major League Baseball. He pitched for the St. Louis Cardinals, Pittsburgh Pirates and Brooklyn Superbas from 1902 to 1906. McFarland retired with a 3.35 earned run average (ERA), but he played on teams with poor hitting, leaving him with a 34-61 win–loss record. He became a prominent movie theater manager in Texas after his playing career ended.

== Early life ==
Born in White Hall, Illinois, McFarland attended White Hall High School and Illinois College. He had a brother, Monte McFarland, who also played major-league baseball.

== Career ==
In McFarland's first major-league season (1902), he made only two appearances for the Cardinals. Between 1903 and 1905, McFarland came close to 20-loss seasons each year; he finished 9-19, 14-18, and 8-18, despite ERAs of 3.07, 3.21 and 3.81. McFarland's last major-league season was 1906, and he played for three teams - the Cardinals, the Pittsburgh Pirates and the Brooklyn Superbas. He made appearances in the minor leagues through 1909.

After McFarland's baseball career, he opened the first vaudeville theater in Houston and then worked for Interstate Amusement in Fort Worth. He came back to Houston and managed three movie theaters in that city for Southern Enterprises, Inc. McFarland was part of a group that nearly bought the minor-league Houston Buffaloes in 1908, but the deal was never finalized. As a theater manager in Houston, McFarland sometimes irritated the Houston Board of Censors; he continued to show Fatty Arbuckle films after the filmmaker became embroiled in controversy, and he showed the film Don't Call It Love despite a controversial kiss.

== Death ==
McFarland died on December 14, 1924 of heart failure while playing golf at the 12th hole of the River Oaks Country Club in Houston, Texas.
