= Bi-State League (1915) =

- Formerly: Wisconsin–Illinois League
- Classification: Class D (1915)
- Sport: Minor League Baseball
- First season: 1915
- Folded: July 7, 1915
- President: B. M. Parsons (1915)
- No. of teams: 6
- Country: United States of America
- Most titles: 1 Streator Boosters (1915)
- Related competitions: Bi-State League

The Bi-State League was an American baseball Class D level minor league which operated in 1915. It was the successor of the Wisconsin–Illinois League and was represented by five teams from Illinois and one from Wisconsin. The Bi-State folded during the 1915 season.

== History ==
The six–team Bi-State League was formed for the 1915 season with the Aurora Foxes, Elgin Watch Makers, Freeport Pretzels, Ottawa Indians, Racine Belles and Streator Boosters as charter members under the direction of president B.M. Parsons. The league evolved from the Wisconsin-Illinois League, which had Racine as a member and folded after the 1914 season.

After beginning play on May 11, 1515, the Bi-State League disbanded on July 7, 1915, after the Elgin and Aurora franchises folded.

The Streator Boosters were in first place in the league standings when the Bi-State League folded. With a 30–18 record, Streator was 1.0 game ahead of the second place Racine Belles (30–20) in the final standings. They were followed by Elgin Watch Makers (27–26), Aurora Foxes (25–27), Freeport Pretzels (23–29) and Ottawa Indians (20–35) in the final standings.

== List of teams ==
- Aurora, Illinois: Aurora Foxes
- Elgin, Illinois: Elgin Watch Makers
- Freeport, Illinois: Freeport Pretzels
- Ottawa, Illinois: Ottawa Indians
- Racine, Wisconsin: Racine Belles
- Streator, Illinois: Streator Boosters

== Standings and statistics ==
1915 Bi-State League

Team standings	W	L	PCT	GB	Managers
Streator Boosters	30	18	.625	-	Jack Herbert
Racine Belles	30	20	.600	1	Frank Reynolds / James Sheffield
Elgin Watch Makers	27	26	.509	5½	Dennis Blake
Aurora Foxes	25	27	.481	7	Clarence Marshall
Freeport Pretzels	23	29	.442	9	Doc Cummings
Ottawa Indians	20	35	.364	13½	Lou Erghott

Elgin & Aurora disbanded July 5. The league disbanded July 7.

Player statistics
Player	Team	Stat	Tot	Player	Team	Stat	Tot
Albert "Bull" Durham	Racine	BA	.356	Eddie Wise	Streator	HR	5
James Sheffield	Racine	Runs	40	Art Mueller	Elgin	HR	5
Clay Schoonover	Racine	Hits	67	Clay Schoonover	Racine	HR	5

== Sources ==
The Encyclopedia of Minor League Baseball: Second Edition: This article is based on the "Bi-States League" article at Baseball-Reference.com Bullpen. The Bullpen is a wiki, and its content is available under the GNU Free Documentation License.
