= White Hall, Illinois =

White Hall
- City
- Location of White Hall in Greene County, Illinois.
- Coordinates: 39°26′27″N 90°23′45″W
- Country: United States
- State: Illinois
- County: Greene
- Township: White Hall

Area
  - Total: 2.63 sq mi (6.82 km^{2})
  - Land: 2.58 sq mi (6.68 km^{2})
  - Water: 0.058 sq mi (0.15 km^{2})
- Elevation: 577 ft (176 m)

Population (2020)
  - Total: 2,295
  - Density: 890.5/sq mi (343.82/km^{2})
- Time zone: UTC−6 (CST)
  - Summer (DST): UTC−5 (CDT)
- ZIP code: 62092
- Area code: 217
- FIPS code: 17-81256
- GNIS feature ID: 2397302
- Website: www.whitehallil.org

White Hall is a city in Greene County, Illinois, United States. The population was 2,295 at the 2020 census.

== History ==
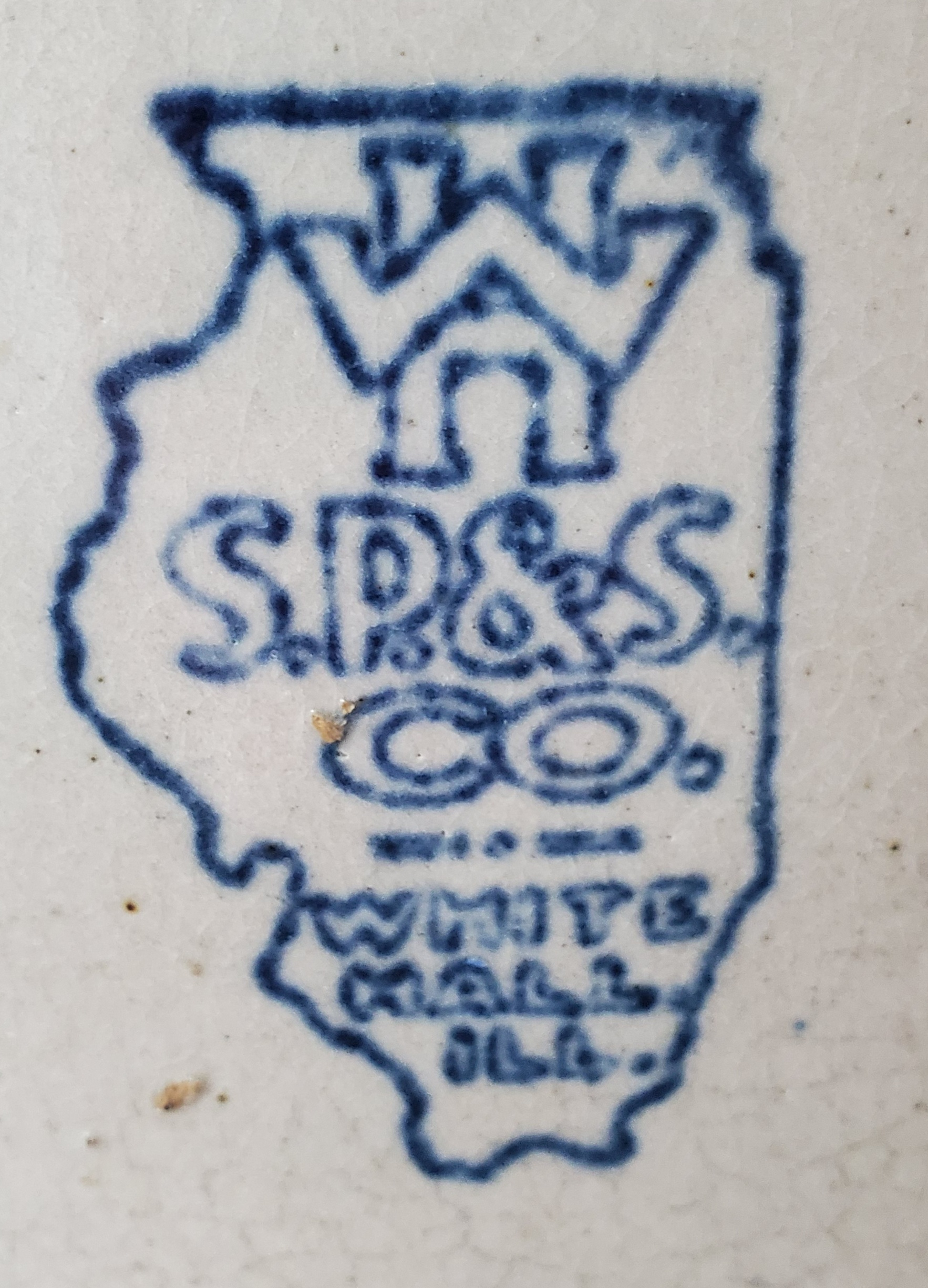
White Hall Sewer Pipe & Stoneware Company Logo

A post office called White Hall has been in operation since 1827. In 1830 a David Barrow was the first person to build and in a location that would become White Hall. Two years later he bought another 80 acres of land at the price of $200 for the purpose of creating the town. Four years later, in 1836 White Hall was official established. This area was the home to a long, white tavern owned by James Allen, which was the only hotel between Carrollton, Illinois and Jacksonville, Illinois. The town got its name from the fact that when a stage was approaching the tavern, the driver would call out "Next stop, the White Hall."

White Hall became known for pottery as ceramics was historically one of the town's top industries. Between 1825 and 1948 White Hall had 39 commercial potteries. One of the earliest was established by John Neff Ebey. Other pottery operations included William Heath, George Ebey, David Brunk, the Davis brothers, David Culbertson, A. D. Ruckel, the Vermillion brothers, William Teter, and the White Hall Sewer Pipe & Stoneware Company. Stoneware from A. D. Ruckel's White Hall Pottery Works and White Hall Sewer Pipe and Stoneware Company remain well known to collectors.

== Geography ==
According to the 2021 census gazetteer files, White Hall has a total area of 2.63 square miles (6.81 km^{2}), of which 2.58 square miles (6.68 km^{2}) (or 97.84%) is land and 0.06 square miles (0.16 km^{2}) (or 2.16%) is water.

=== Climate ===
Climate data for White Hall, Illinois (1991–2020 normals, extremes 1887–present)
Month	Jan	Feb	Mar	Apr	May	Jun	Jul	Aug	Sep	Oct	Nov	Dec	Year
Record high °F (°C)	77 (25)	83 (28)	94 (34)	93 (34)	103 (39)	106 (41)	113 (45)	112 (44)	104 (40)	95 (35)	84 (29)	74 (23)	113 (45)
Mean daily maximum °F (°C)	35.4 (1.9)	40.5 (4.7)	51.7 (10.9)	64.1 (17.8)	73.9 (23.3)	82.5 (28.1)	85.6 (29.8)	84.4 (29.1)	78.9 (26.1)	66.8 (19.3)	52.3 (11.3)	40.5 (4.7)	63.0 (17.2)
Daily mean °F (°C)	26.9 (−2.8)	31.2 (−0.4)	41.6 (5.3)	53.0 (11.7)	63.5 (17.5)	72.4 (22.4)	75.7 (24.3)	74.0 (23.3)	67.0 (19.4)	55.1 (12.8)	42.5 (5.8)	32.1 (0.1)	52.9 (11.6)
Mean daily minimum °F (°C)	18.4 (−7.6)	21.9 (−5.6)	31.5 (−0.3)	41.9 (5.5)	53.2 (11.8)	62.3 (16.8)	65.7 (18.7)	63.6 (17.6)	55.1 (12.8)	43.4 (6.3)	32.6 (0.3)	23.7 (−4.6)	42.8 (6.0)
Record low °F (°C)	−26 (−32)	−25 (−32)	−13 (−25)	11 (−12)	22 (−6)	35 (2)	44 (7)	41 (5)	25 (−4)	13 (−11)	−6 (−21)	−20 (−29)	−26 (−32)
Average precipitation inches (mm)	2.06 (52)	2.05 (52)	2.91 (74)	4.41 (112)	4.81 (122)	4.67 (119)	3.87 (98)	3.35 (85)	2.99 (76)	3.02 (77)	3.11 (79)	2.33 (59)	39.58 (1,005)
Average snowfall inches (cm)	6.3 (16)	4.7 (12)	1.8 (4.6)	0.4 (1.0)	0.0 (0.0)	0.0 (0.0)	0.0 (0.0)	0.0 (0.0)	0.0 (0.0)	0.0 (0.0)	1.3 (3.3)	3.7 (9.4)	18.2 (46)
Average precipitation days (≥ 0.01 in)	8.2	7.4	10.9	12.1	13.4	10.7	8.8	8.7	8.0	9.6	9.1	8.9	115.8
Average snowy days (≥ 0.1 in)	3.2	2.5	1.1	0.2	0.0	0.0	0.0	0.0	0.0	0.0	0.6	2.2	9.8
Source: NOAA

== Demographics ==
Historical population
Census	Pop.	Note	%±
1870	1,200		—
1890	1,961		—
1900	2,030		3.5%
1910	2,854		40.6%
1920	2,954		3.5%
1930	2,928		−0.9%
1940	3,025		3.3%
1950	3,082		1.9%
1960	3,012		−2.3%
1970	2,979		−1.1%
1980	2,935		−1.5%
1990	2,814		−4.1%
2000	2,629		−6.6%
2010	2,520		−4.1%
2020	2,295		−8.9%
U.S. Decennial Census

=== 2020 census ===
As of the 2020 census, White Hall had a population of 2,295. There were 572 families residing in the city. The population density was 871.30 inhabitants per square mile (336.41/km^{2}).

The median age was 45.6 years. 22.5% of residents were under the age of 18 and 23.1% of residents were 65 years of age or older. For every 100 females there were 97.5 males, and for every 100 females age 18 and over there were 96.9 males age 18 and over.

0.0% of residents lived in urban areas, while 100.0% lived in rural areas.

Of the city's 945 households, 24.4% had children under the age of 18 living in them. Of all households, 42.8% were married-couple households, 23.9% were households with a male householder and no spouse or partner present, and 25.0% were households with a female householder and no spouse or partner present. About 35.6% of all households were made up of individuals, and 18.1% had someone living alone who was 65 years of age or older.

There were 1,081 housing units at an average density of 410.40 per square mile (158.46/km^{2}), of which 12.6% were vacant. The homeowner vacancy rate was 4.6% and the rental vacancy rate was 3.0%.

Racial composition as of the 2020 census
Race	Number	Percent
White	2,198	95.8%
Black or African American	2	0.1%
American Indian and Alaska Native	3	0.1%
Asian	8	0.3%
Native Hawaiian and Other Pacific Islander	2	0.1%
Some other race	0	0.0%
Two or more races	82	3.6%
Hispanic or Latino (of any race)	16	0.7%

=== Income and poverty ===
The median income for a household in the city was $42,596, and the median income for a family was $51,250. Males had a median income of $31,762 versus $26,705 for females. The per capita income for the city was $23,208. About 4.7% of families and 11.2% of the population were below the poverty line, including 8.6% of those under age 18 and 4.9% of those age 65 or over.

== Notable people ==
- Edward B. Giller, United States Air Force general
- Chappie McFarland, pitcher for the St. Louis Cardinals, Pittsburgh Pirates and Brooklyn Superbas
- Monte McFarland, pitcher for the Chicago Colts
