= Bert Ellison =

American baseball player (1896–1955)

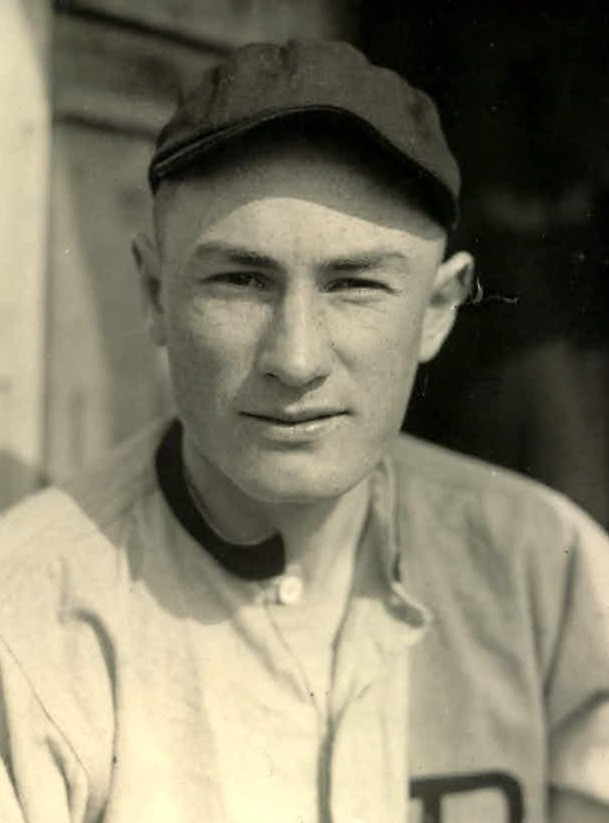
- Ellison in 1916
- First baseman
- Born: November 15, 1896; Ola, Arkansas, U.S.
- Died: August 11, 1955 (aged 58); San Francisco, California, U.S.
- Batted: Right Threw: Right

MLB debut
- September 18, 1916, for the Detroit Tigers

Last MLB appearance
- September 23, 1920, for the Detroit Tigers

MLB statistics
- Batting average: .216
- Home runs: 1
- Runs batted in: 42
- Stats at Baseball Reference

Teams
- Detroit Tigers (1916–1920)

Herbert Spencer Ellison (November 15, 1896 – August 11, 1955) was an American baseball player. He played professional baseball for 14 years, from 1915 to 1928, including five seasons in Major League Baseball with the Detroit Tigers from 1916 to 1920. He also played seven seasons with the San Francisco Seals of the Pacific Coast League from 1921 to 1927. Ellison was inducted into the Pacific Coast League Hall of Fame in 2006.

== Early years ==
Ellison was born in Ola, Yell County, Arkansas, in 1896. In 1910, he was living with his grandfather John Sundlin, a farmer in Yell County.

Ellison enrolled at the University of Arkansas. He played third base and led the Arkansas Razorbacks baseball team in batting in 1914. He also played for the Arkansas Razorbacks football team in the fall of 1914.

== Professional baseball ==
=== Minor leagues ===
In March 1915, it was reported that Ellison had signed with the St. Louis Cardinals. He spent the 1915 season playing in Iowa for the Clinton Pilots of the Central Association. He played at the shortstop position for Clinton and compiled a .251 batting average in 112 games.

In August 1915, the Detroit Tigers purchased Ellison from the Clinton club. He was assigned for the 1916 season to the Muscatine Muskies of the Central Association. He compiled a .361 batting average in 127 games with the Muskies.

=== Detroit Tigers ===
At the end of August 1916, the Tigers purchased Ellison's release from Muscatine. Ellison made his major league debut with the Tigers at age 19 on September 18, 1916. He appeared in only two games for the Tigers in 1916, registering one hit and one RBI in seven at bats.

In 1917, Ellison appeared in nine games with the Tigers, but spent most of the season with the St. Paul Saints of the American Association. He compiled a .278 batting average in 139 games with St. Paul.

In 1918, Ellison again returned to the Tigers, appearing in seven games and batting .261. He developed a reputation as "the best utility man the Tigers ever had on their roster." However, he was lost to the Tigers for most of the 1918 season after being ordered to report to the local draft board in Yell County, Arkansas, between April 25 and 30.

In 1919, Ellison finally spent a prolonged period with the Tigers, appearing in 56 games and batting .216. In 1920, he appeared in 61 games and compiled a .219 batting average. Over five seasons with the Tigers, Ellison appeared in a total of 135 games, including 47 as a first baseman, 28 as a second baseman, 18 as an outfielder, three as a third baseman, and one as a shortstop. He compiled a career batting average of .216 with the Tigers.

=== San Francisco Seals ===
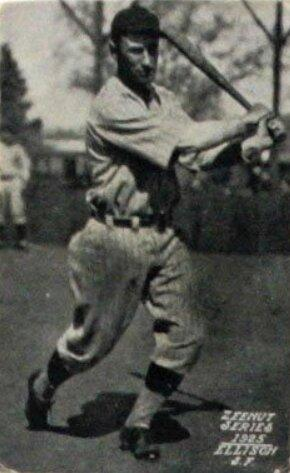
1925 baseball card of Ellison

On November 17, 1920, the Tigers traded Ellison to the San Francisco Seals of the Pacific Coast League (PCL) in exchange for pitcher Bert Cole. Ellison played for the Seals from 1921 to 1927 and was the club's player-manager from 1923 to 1926.

Ellison led the Seals to two PCL championships and compiled a 322–250 record as the team's manager. His 1925 team finished 128–71, featured Lefty O'Doul, Earl Averill, and Paul Waner, and was ranked by MiLB.com as the 10th best minor league baseball team of all time. Ellison hit .325 with 22 home runs and 160 RBI that year.

Ellison set multiple PCL records, including most home runs in a doubleheader (five), most home runs in a series (ten), and most hits in a series, going 25 for 37, including 10 home runs, against Salt Lake City from May 20 to 25, 1924. Ellison's best season in the PCL was 1924, when he hit .381 with 33 home runs and 183 RBI.

In seven seasons with the Seals, Ellison appeared in 1,042 games, compiled a .335 batting average, and totaled 1,329 hits, 278 doubles, 43 triples, 116 RBIs, and 778 RBI. He was posthumously inducted into the Pacific Coast League Hall of Fame in 2006.

=== Minneapolis and Dallas ===
On April 23, 1927, the Seals sold Ellison to the Minneapolis Millers of the American Association. He played first base for the Millers in 1938 and compiled a .248 batting average in 52 games.

On December 1, 1927, Ellison was hired as player-manager of the Dallas Steers in the Texas League. He compiled a .298 batting average in 79 games with the Steers. Due to the team's failure to make a satisfactory showing, Ellison was removed as the Steers' manager on August 2, 1928.

== Later years ==
After retiring from baseball, Ellison continued to live in San Francisco. In 1930, he was employed as an electric welder in the oil industry. Between 1930 and 1940, he was married to Ethel Shaw Ellison. In 1940, he worked in the customs department as an appraiser.

Ellison died in 1955 at age 58 at St. Luke's Hospital in San Francisco. He was survived by a wife, Bernice.
