= Malachi Kittridge =

American baseball player (1869–1928)

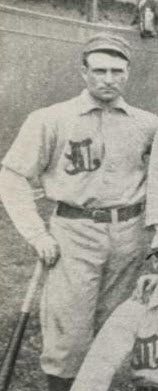
- Catcher / Manager
- Born: October 12, 1869; Clinton, Massachusetts, U.S.
- Died: June 23, 1928 (aged 58); Gary, Indiana, U.S.
- Batted: Right Threw: Right

MLB debut
- April 19, 1890, for the Chicago Colts

Last MLB appearance
- August 8, 1906, for the Cleveland Naps

MLB statistics
- Batting average: .219
- Home runs: 17
- Runs scored: 390
- Stats at Baseball Reference

Teams
- As player: Chicago Colts (1890–1897); Louisville Colonels (1898–1899); Washington Senators (NL) (1899); Boston Beaneaters (1901–1903); Washington Senators (AL) (1903–1906); Cleveland Naps (1906); As manager: Washington Senators (AL) (1904)

Malachi Jeddidiah Kittridge (October 12, 1869 – June 23, 1928) was an American professional baseball catcher. He played 16 seasons in Major League Baseball (MLB) between 1890 and 1906, for six different teams, predominantly the Chicago Colts of the National League. He batted and threw right-handed.

== Biography ==
Kittridge was not a good hitter—he had a .219 batting average for his major-league career—but in his career he was regarded as having one of the best throwing arms. In 1904, he was hired as player-manager of the Washington Senators of the American League, but the team started the season 1–16 (.059), and Kittridge was replaced by Patsy Donovan. The Senators finished with a 38–113 (.252) record for the season.

Kittridge was traded to the Cleveland Naps in the middle of the 1906 season, but he only had five at bats for the Naps before retiring from baseball. In 1910, Kittridge served as player-manager of the Elgin Kittens in the Class D level Northern Association. The team's "Kittens" moniker was in honor of Kittridge. The team finished in first place.

== See also ==
- List of Major League Baseball player–managers
