= Monte McFarland =

American baseball player (1872–1913)

- Pitcher
- Born: November 7, 1872; White Hall, Illinois, U.S.
- Died: November 15, 1913 (aged 41); Peoria, Illinois, U.S.
- Batted: Right Threw: Unknown

MLB debut
- September 14, 1895, for the Chicago Colts

Last MLB appearance
- June 8, 1896, for the Chicago Colts

MLB statistics
- Win–loss record: 2–4
- Earned run average: 6.46
- Strikeouts: 8
- Stats at Baseball Reference

Teams
- Chicago Colts (1895–1896)

Lamont Amos "Monte" McFarland (November 7, 1872 – November 15, 1913) was an American pitcher in Major League Baseball who played for the Chicago Colts in 1895 and 1896. He remained active as a player in the minor leagues through 1910.

His brother, Chappie McFarland, was also a professional baseball player.
