= Charlie Buelow =

American baseball player (1877-1951)

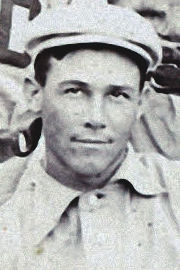
- Third baseman
- Born: January 12, 1877; Dubuque, Iowa, U.S.
- Died: May 4, 1951 (aged 74); Dubuque, Iowa, U.S.
- Batted: Right Threw: Right

MLB debut
- June 1, 1901, for the New York Giants

Last MLB appearance
- August 1, 1901, for the New York Giants

MLB statistics
- Batting average: .111
- Hits: 8
- Runs batted in: 4
- Stats at Baseball Reference

Teams
- New York Giants (1901)

Charles John Buelow (January 12, 1877 – May 4, 1951) was an American Major League Baseball infielder for the New York Giants in 1901.
