= Joliet, Illinois, minor league baseball history =

Joliet, Illinois minor league baseball teams
- 1890–1910; (1890–1892, 1910, 2002–present); Joliet, Illinois

Minor league affiliations
- Class: Independent (1890–1891); Class F (1892); Class B (1903); Class D (1910); Independent (2002–present)
- League: Illinois-Iowa League (1890–1892); Illinois-Indiana-Iowa League (1903); Northern Association (1910); Northern League (2002–2010); Frontier League (2011–present)

Major league affiliations
- Team: None

Minor league titles
- League titles (1): 1892

Team data
- Name: Joliet Convicts (1890); Joliet Giants (1891); Joliet Convicts (1892); Joliet Standards (1903); Joliet Jolly-ites (1910); Joliet Jackhammers (2002–2010); Joliet Slammers (2011–present)
- Ballpark: Unknown (1890–1892, 1910); Duly Health and Care Field (2002–present)

Minor league baseball teams were based in Joliet, Illinois between 1890 and 1910, before resuming play in 2002. Joliet teams played as members of the Illinois-Iowa League from 1890 to 1892, the Illinois-Indiana-Iowa League in 1903 and Northern Association in 1910.

== History ==
Early baseball in Joliet featured the amateur "Joliet Stone Citys" as a local team beginning in 1875. On September 28, 1875, Joliet hosted a game against the original Chicago White Stockings, who became the Chicago Cubs. Joliet lost the game by the score of 29–1.

Joliet first hosted minor league baseball in 1890. The Joliet Convicts became members of the Independent level Illinois-Iowa League. In their first season of play, the Joliet Convicts placed sixth with a record of 56–59 in the eight–team Illinois–Iowa League. W.E. Buckley and Ed Culberson served as the Joliet managers as the Convicts finished 14.0 games behind the first place Ottumwa Coal Palace Kings in the final standings.

The Joliet use of the "Convicts" moniker was in reference to local industry, with Joliet, Illinois being home to the Joliet Correctional Center beginning in 1858.

In 1891, the Joliet Giants continued play as members of the Illinois–Iowa League and finished in second place. Joliet ended the 1891 season with a record of 62–48 as Billy Moran and Tim Manning served as managers. The Giants finished 8.0 games behind the first place Quincy Ravens in the final 1891 standings.

The 1892 Joliet Convicts won the Illinois–Iowa League championship. The Convicts ended the 1892 season with a record of 55–27, placing first in the Illinois–Iowa League, which held no playoffs. Billy Murray served as manager of the championship season, as Joliet finished 10.0 games ahead of the second place Rockford Hustlers in the eight–team league. Four league teams folded during the season and the Illinois–Iowa League folded following the 1892 season.

In 1903, the Joliet Standards played briefly as members of the Class B level Illinois-Indiana-Iowa League. On June 12, 1902, Joliet had a record of 14–19 when the franchise relocated to Springfield, Illinois. The Joliet Standards/Springfield Foot Trackers ended the Illinois–Iowa–Indiana League season with an overall record of 42–80 placing eighth and last in the standings. Frank Belt served as manager, as Joliet finished 31.5 games behind the first place Bloomington Bloomers.

Minor league baseball returned briefly in 1910, as the Joliet Jolly-ites began the season as members of the Class D level Northern Association, before relocating during the season. On June 21, 1910, Joliet had a record of 21–18 when the franchise relocated to Sterling, Illinois and finished the season as the Sterling Infants. The Joliet Jolly-ites/Sterling Infants ended the Northern Association season with an overall record of 24–34, placing sixth in the National Association. Hunkey Hines served as manager as the Jteam finished 13.5 games behind the first place Elgin Kittens. The Northern Association permanently folded on July 19, 1910.

Joliet was without minor league baseball until the 2002 Joliet Jackhammers began play as members of the Independent level Northern League. Since 2011, the Joliet Slammers have continued play as members of the Frontier League.

== The ballpark ==
The name of the Joliet early home minor league ballpark(s) is unknown. It was noted the Convicts' home ballpark was located on Mississippi Avenue, between Fourth Avenue and Hickory Creek in Joliet, Illinois.

Beginning in 2002, the Joliet minor league teams have hosted minor league home games at Duly Health and Care Field.

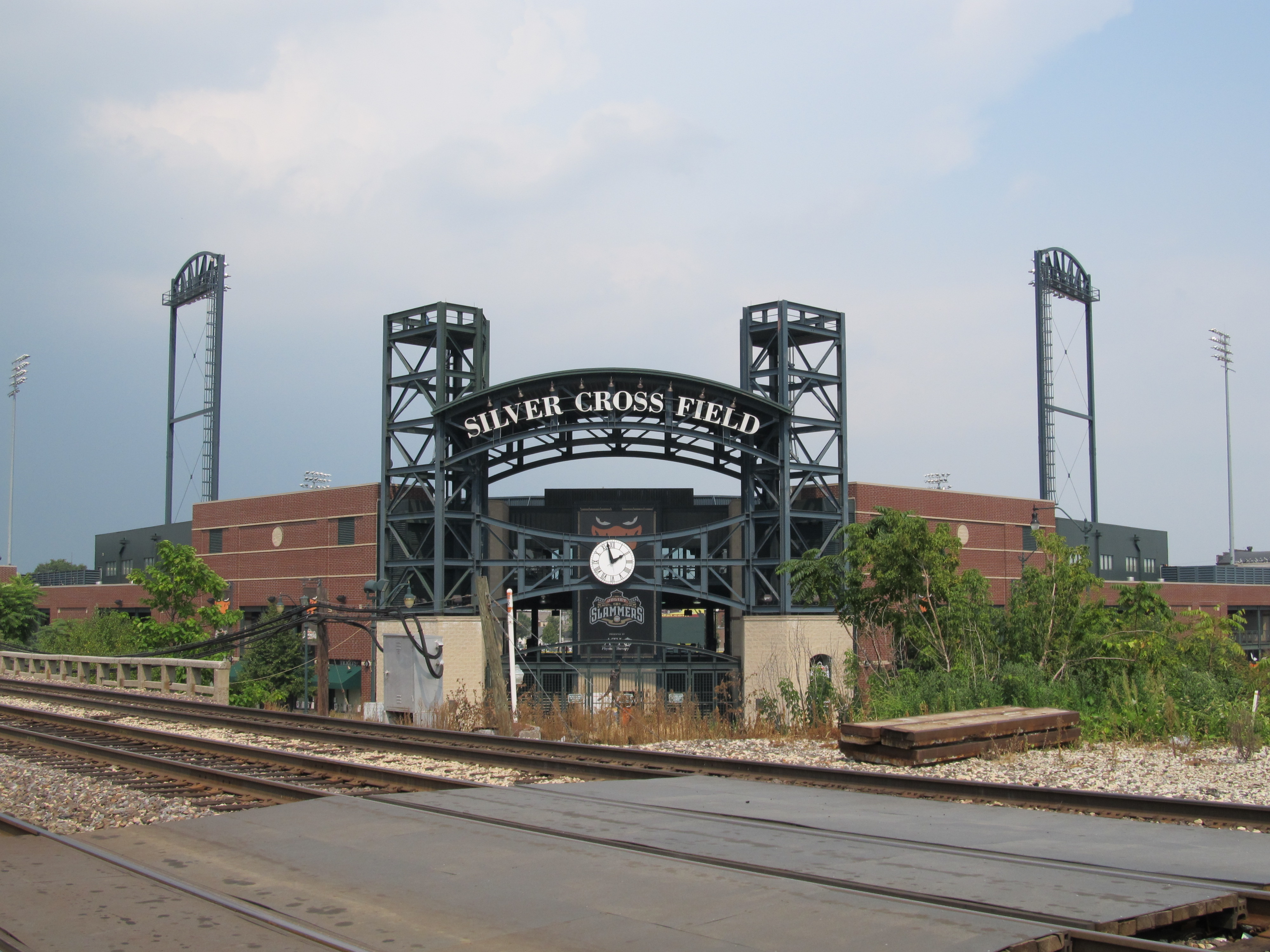
(2011) Silver Cross Field, now Duly Health and Care Field. Joliet, Illinois

== Timeline ==
Year(s)	# Yrs.	Team	Level	League
1890	1	Joliet Convicts	Independent	Illinois-Iowa League
1891	1	Joliet Giants	Independent	Illinois-Iowa League
1892	1	Joliet Convicts	Class F	Illinois-Iowa League
1903	1	Joliet Standards	Class B	Illinois-Iowa-Indiana League
1910	1	Joliet Jolly-ites	Class D	Northern Association
2002–2010	9	Joliet Jackhammers	Independent	Northern League
2011–pr	–	Joliet Slammers	Independent	Frontier League

== Year–by–year records ==
Year	Record	Place	Manager	Playoffs/notes
1890	56–56	6th	W.E. Buckley / Ed Culbertson	No playoff held
1891	62–48	2nd	Billy Moran / Tim Manning	No playoff held
1892	55–27	1st	Billy Moran	League champions
1903	14–9	NA	Frank Belt	Moved to Springfield June 12
1910	21–18	NA	Hunkey Hines	Moved to Sterling June 21

== Notable alumni ==
- Tom Asmussen (1903)
- John Buckley (1890)
- Harry Burrell (1891)
- Ben Caffyn (1903)
- Jim Connor (1892)
- George Decker (1891–1892)
- Frank Donnelly (1892)
- Bill Geiss (1891)
- Hunkey Hines (1910, MGR)
- Bill Hoffer (1892)
- Larry Hoffman (1903)
- John Houseman (1892)
- Jim Hughey (1890)
- Billy Kinloch (1903)
- Bumpus Jones (1892)
- Tom Letcher (1890)
- Dan Mahoney (1892)
- Tim Manning (1891, MGR)
- Frank Millard (1890)
- Bill Moran (catcher) (1891)
- Gene Moriarty (1891)
- Billy Murray (1892)
- Offa Neal (1903)
- Parson Nicholson (1892)
- Bill Sowders (1891)
- Wally Taylor (1891)

== See also ==
Joliet (minor league baseball) players
Joliet Convicts players
Joliet Giants players
Joliet Standards players
