= Bruce Evans (baseball) =

American baseball player

- Outfielder

Negro league baseball debut
- 1916, for the All Nations

Last appearance
- 1916, for the All Nations

Teams
- All Nations (1916)

Bruce Evans was an American Negro league outfielder in the 1910s.

Evans played for the All Nations club in 1916. In six recorded games, he posted four hits in 25 plate appearances.
