= Offa Neal =

American baseball player (1876-1950)

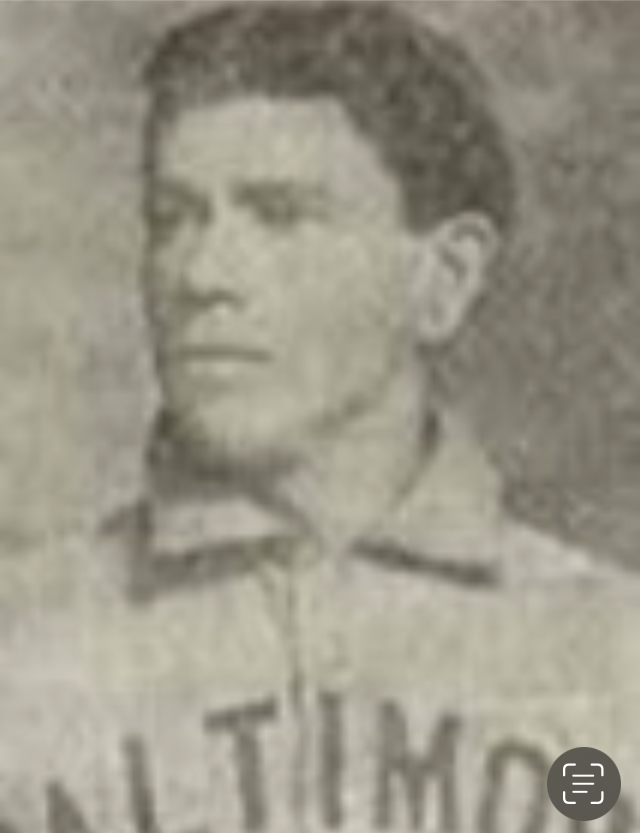
- Third baseman
- Born: June 5, 1876; Franklin County, Illinois, U.S.
- Died: April 25, 1950 (aged 73); Mount Vernon, Illinois, U.S.
- Batted: Left Threw: Right

MLB debut
- September 30, 1905, for the New York Giants

Last MLB appearance
- October 3, 1905, for the New York Giants

MLB statistics
- Batting average: .000
- Hits: 0
- Runs batted in: 0
- Stats at Baseball Reference

Teams
- New York Giants (1905)

Theophilus Fountain Neal (June 5, 1876 – April 25, 1950) was an American Major League Baseball third baseman for the New York Giants. Neal played in four games with the Giants in 1905 and recorded 13 at-bats without getting a hit. He managed in the minor leagues in 1912.
