= Fritz Maisel =

American baseball player (1889-1967)

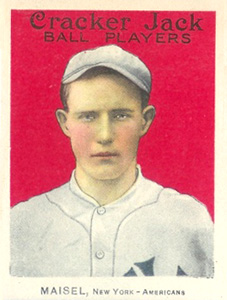
- Third baseman
- Born: December 23, 1889; Catonsville, Maryland, U.S.
- Died: April 22, 1967 (aged 77); Baltimore, Maryland, U.S.
- Batted: Right Threw: Right

MLB debut
- August 11, 1913, for the New York Highlanders

Last MLB appearance
- August 28, 1918, for the St. Louis Browns

MLB statistics
- Batting average: .242
- Home runs: 6
- Runs batted in: 148
- Stolen bases: 194
- Stats at Baseball Reference

Teams
- New York Highlanders/Yankees (1913–1917); St. Louis Browns (1918)

Career highlights and awards
- AL stolen base leader (1914)

Frederick Charles "Fritz" Maisel (December 23, 1889 – April 22, 1967) was an American professional baseball player who played third base in the Major Leagues from 1913 to 1918, and was later a minor league player and manager and a major league scout. In his Major League career, he played for the New York Yankees and St. Louis Browns. Because of his speed on the basepaths, he was known as "Catonsville Flash" or just "Flash" by his fans. In 1914, he led the American League with 74 stolen bases and was only caught stealing 17 times that year, an 81 percent success rate.

Maisel was born in Catonsville, Maryland. In 1910, he was signed by Jack Dunn of the Baltimore Orioles and started with an Orioles farm team (probably the Elgin Kittens) in Elgin, Illinois. (The Orioles were a minor league team during the period of 1903 through 1953.) After his major league career, he rejoined the Baltimore Orioles as team captain in 1919 and led the team to seven straight International League pennants. In 1929, after the death of Jack Dunn, Fritz became the manager of the Orioles and managed them from the 1929 through 1932 seasons. He was inducted into the International League Hall of Fame in 1959.

Maisel was not regarded by some as a very successful manager for the Orioles of the International League, despite his winning record. He did not have much talent on the team and became a laughing stock of the Baltimore press. He was blamed for all the misfortunes of the team.

Maisel was Chief of the Baltimore County Fire Department from 1938 to 1951. At the time of his death, he was a scout for the Baltimore Orioles (the Orioles have been a Major League Baseball team since 1954). He was a lifelong resident of Catonsville. Maisel died on April 22, 1967 at St. Agnes Hospital in Baltimore, Maryland after an elongated illness.

== See also ==
- List of Major League Baseball annual stolen base leaders

== External links and sources ==
- Baseball Reference
- Catonsville "Herald-Argus" newspaper article, circa 22 April 1967 entitled "Fritz Maisel, Catonsville's Famous Baseball Hero, Dies"
- "Professional Baseball Franchises", by Peter Filichia, "Facts On File", New York, 1993
- "The ESPN Baseball Encyclopedia, Fourth Edition", edited by Gary Gillette and Pete Palmer, Sterling Publishing, New York, 2007
- Chadwick, Bruce, and David Spindel. "The Baltimore Orioles: Memories and Memorabilia of the Lords of Baltimore." New York: Abbeville Press, 1995.
- Bready, James. "Baseball in Baltimore: The First Hundred Years." Baltimore: The Johns Hopkins University Press, 1998.
- International League Hall of Fame Entry
