= Hunkey Hines =

American baseball player (1867–1928)

- Outfielder
- Born: September 29, 1867; Elgin, Illinois, U.S.
- Died: January 2, 1928 (aged 60); Rockford, Illinois, U.S.
- Batted: Right Threw: Right

MLB debut
- May 16, 1895, for the Brooklyn Grooms

Last MLB appearance
- May 18, 1895, for the Brooklyn Grooms

MLB statistics
- Batting average: .250
- Home runs: 0
- Runs batted in: 1
- Stats at Baseball Reference

Teams
- Brooklyn Grooms (1895)

Henry Fred Hines (September 29, 1867 in Elgin, Illinois – January 2, 1928 in Rockford, Illinois), was an American former professional baseball player who played outfield in two games for the Brooklyn Grooms during the 1895 baseball season.
