= Virginia League =

Minor league baseball affiliation in Virginia and North Carolina, U.S.

Virginia League (1906–1928)
- Formerly: Virginia League (1900)
- Classification: Class C (1906–1919); Class D (1920–1928)
- Sport: Minor League Baseball
- First season: 1906
- Folded: 1928
- Replaced by: Virginia League (1939–42)
- President: Jake Wells(1906–1909); C.R. Williams (1910–1911); Jacob O. Boatwright (1912–1915); Burrus Corprew (1916); William B. Bradley (1917–1921); W. S. Moye (1922–1924); William G. Bramham (1925–1928)
- No. of teams: 15
- Country: United States of America
- Most titles: 5 Richmond Colts (1908, 1918, 1924–1926)

The Virginia League was a minor league baseball affiliation which operated in Virginia and North Carolina from 1906 to 1928. It was classified as a "C" league from 1906 to 1919 and as a "B" league from 1920 to 1928, folding in June.

The most famous alumni to come out of the league were World War II hero, General Frank A. Armstrong (the highest-ranking military officer to have played professional baseball), and Hall of Fame members Rick Ferrell, Sam Rice, Chief Bender, Pie Traynor, and Hack Wilson. Chief Bender, Art Devlin, Gabby Street and Zinn Beck served as managers in the league.

== Virginia League Champions † ==
- 1906 - Lynchburg Shoemakers
- 1907 - Norfolk Tars
- 1908 - Richmond Colts
- 1909 - Roanoke Tigers
- 1910 - Danville Red Sox
- 1911 - Petersburg Hustlers
- 1912 - Roanoke Tigers
- 1913 - Petersburg Goobers
- 1914 - Norfolk Tars
- 1915 - Rocky Mount Carolinians
- 1916 - Newport News Shipbuilders
- 1917 - Newport News Shipbuilders
- 1918 - Richmond Colts
- 1919 - Petersburg Goobers
- 1920 - Portsmouth Truckers
- 1921 - Portsmouth Truckers
- 1922 - Wilson Bugs
- 1923 - Wilson Tobacconists
- 1924 - Richmond Colts
- 1925 - Richmond Colts
- 1926 - Richmond Colts
- 1927 - Portsmouth Truckers
- 1928 - Norfolk Tars

† Playoffs were not held at the end of most seasons. In those cases, the Champions listed were the teams who ended the regular season in first place.

== Complete team list (1906-1928) ==
- Danville Bugs (1911)
- Danville Red Sox (1906–1910, 1912)
- Hopewell Powder Puffs (1916)
- Kinston Eagles (1925–1927)
- Lynchburg Shoemakers (1906–1912, 1917)
- Newport News Shipbuilders (1912–1922)
- Norfolk Mary Janes (1920)
- Norfolk Tars (1906–1919, 1921–1928)
- Petersburg Broncos↑ (1926–1928)
- Petersburg Goobers (1910, 1912–1921, 1924)
- Petersburg Hustlers (1911)
- Petersburg Trunkmakers (1923)
- Portsmouth Foxes (1916)
- Portsmouth Pirates (1912–1913)
- Portsmouth Truckers (1906–1910, 1914–1915, 1917, 1919–1928)
- Richmond Colts (1906–1914, 1918–1928)
- Roanoke Tigers (1906–1914)
- Roanoke Rapids‡ (1916)
- Rocky Mount Broncos↑ (1924–1925)
- Rocky Mount Carolinians (1915)
- Rocky Mount Tar Heels (1916–1917, 1920–1923)
- Suffolk Nuts (1919–1920)
- Suffolk Tigers (1915)
- Suffolk Wildcats (1921)
- Tarboro Tarbabies (1921)
- Wilson Bugs (1920–1922,1924–1927)
- Wilson Tobacconists (1923)

↑ Also spelled "Bronchos."

‡ This team had no known nickname.

== Standings & statistics ==
=== 1906 to 1919 Class C ===
1906 Virginia League

Team standings	W	L	PCT	GB	Manager
Lynchburg Shoemakers	72	36	.667	-	John J. Grim
Norfolk Tars	62	44	.585	9	Win Clark
Richmond Colts	57	54	.514	16½	Charles Shaffer
Danville Red Sox	50	58	.463	22	John Benny / Frank Doyle
Portsmouth Truckers	44	63	.411	27½	Ernest Landgraf / Barley Kain
Roanoke Tigers	42	72	.368	33	C.R. Williams / George Kelley; Con Strouthers / Red McMahon

No playoffs held

Player statistics
Player	Team	Stat	Tot	Player	Team	Stat	Tot
Win Clark	Norfolk	BA	.303	Walter Moser	Lynchburg	W	24
Fred Dingle	Norfolk	Runs	71	Charles Schuman	Portsmouth	SO	234
A.N. Bowen	Lynchburg	Runs	71	Walter Moser	Lynchburg	PCT	.750 24-8
Win Clark	Norfolk	Hits	117				
Willie Fetzer	Danville	Hits	117				
Willie Fetzer	Danville	HR	5				

1907 Virginia League
schedule

Team standings	W	L	PCT	GB	Manager
Norfolk Tars	67	48	.583	-	Robert Pender
Danville Red Sox	67	58	.536	5	James McKevitt
Lynchburg Shoemakers	65	62	.512	8	John J. Grim
Richmond Colts	62	62	.500	9½	Charles Shaffer / John Wells; Ralph Reeve
Roanoke Tigers	62	62	.500	9½	Win Clark / Walter Brodie
Portsmouth Truckers	46	77	.374	25	Charles Moss / Win Clark

No playoffs held

Player statistics
Player	Team	Stat	Tot	Player	Team	Stat	Tot
Jacob Henn	Danville	BA	.284	Bill Otey	Norfolk	W	22
Guy Titman	Richmond	Runs	67	Bill Otey	Norfolk	SO	197
Jacob Henn	Danville	Hits	131	Hal Bertrand	Norfolk	PCT	.818 9-2
Jacob Henn	Danville	RBI	69				
Jacob Henn	Danville	HR	8				

1908 Virginia League
schedule

Team standings	W	L	PCT	GB	Manager
Richmond Colts	87	41	.680	-	Perry Lipe
Danville Red Sox	74	52	.587	12	Robert Stafford
Roanoke Tigers	63	67	.485	25	Charles Shaffer / Elmore Hines
Portsmouth Truckers	57	71	.445	30	Steve Griffin / Andy Lawrence
Lynchburg Shoemakers	52	76	.406	35	Al Orth / John J. Grim; Robert Westlake
Norfolk Tars	52	78	.400	36	Robert Pender

No playoffs held

Player statistics
Player	Team	Stat	Tot	Player	Team	Stat	Tot
Jacob Henn	Danville	BA	.290	Martin Walsh	Danville	W	30
Perry Lipe	Richmond	Runs	65	Dutch Revell	Richmond	SO	199
Bill Hessler	Roanoke	Hits	133	Jack Quinn	Richmond	PCT	1.000 14-0
Jacob Henn	Danville	RBI	72				
Jacob Henn	Danville	HR	8				

1909 Virginia League

Team standings	W	L	PCT	GB	Manager
Roanoke Tigers	73	49	.598	-	Frank Shaughnessy
Norfolk Tars	72	49	.595	½	Robert Pender / Win Clark
Richmond Colts	63	61	.508	11	Perry Lipe
Danville Red Sox	60	62	.496	13	Robert Stafford
Portsmouth Truckers	49	72	.406	23½	Maurice White / Thomas Guiheen
Lynchburg Shoemakers	50	74	.403	24	Al Orth / Dickinson; Andy Lawrence

No playoffs held.

Player statistics
Player	Team	Stat	Tot	Player	Team	Stat	Tot
Charles Seitz	Norfolk	BA	.328	Dutch Revell	Richmond	W	29
Charles Seitz	Norfolk	Runs	73	Walt Doane	Roanoke	SO	208
Charles Seitz	Norfolk	Hits	154	John Fox	Norfolk	PCT	.769 20-6
Charles Seitz	Norfolk	RBI	78	Dutch Revell	Richmond	SHO	15
Frank Shaughnessy	Roanoke	HR	5				

1910 Virginia League
schedule

Team standings	W	L	PCT	GB	Manager
Danville Red Sox	69	45	.605	-	Steve Griffin
Roanoke Tigers	68	52	.567	4	Frank Shaughnessy
Norfolk Tars	58	56	.513	11	Win Clark
Lynchburg Shoemakers	57	60	.487	13½	Dick Smith
Richmond Colts	49	67	.422	21	John Lawler
Portsmouth Truckers; Petersburg Goobers	47	68	.409	22½	Robert Stafford / John Grim

Portsmouth (23-31) moved to Petersburg July 5.

No playoffs held.

Player statistics
Player	Team	Stat	Tot	Player	Team	Stat	Tot
Joe Holland	Roanoke	BA	.291	Harvey Bussey	Danville	W	23
Watt Powell	Roanoke	Runs	69	Dutch Revell	Richmond	SO	198
Joe Holland	Roanoke	Hits	133	Walt Doane	Roanoke	PCT	.923 12-1
Joe Holland	Roanoke	RBI	73				
Watt Powell	Roanoke	HR	3				
Joe Holland	Roanoke	HR	3				
Red Munson	Norfolk	HR	3				

1911 Virginia League
schedule

Team standings	W	L	PCT	GB	Manager
Petersburg Hustlers	68	51	.572	-	Henry Busch
Norfolk Tars	67	54	.554	2	Charlie Babb
Roanoke Tigers	63	56	.529	5	Frank Shaughnessy
Richmond Colts	55	63	.466	12½	J.W. Sullivan / Bradley; George Coman
Lynchburg Shoemakers	56	65	.463	13	Otis Stocksdale
Danville Bugs	50	70	.417	18½	Joseph Laughlin / G. Schrader

No playoffs held.

Player statistics
Player	Team	Stat	Tot	Player	Team	Stat	Tot
Bruno Block	Norfolk	BA	.330	Earl Hamilton	Petersburg	W	21
Frank Shaughnessy	Roanoke	Runs	93	Andy Bruckmiller	Petersburg	W	21
Frank Shaughnessy	Roanoke	Hits	160	Joe Finneran	Norfolk	W	21
Mickey Keliher	Petersburg	RBI	84	James Pool	Norfolk	W	21
Ralph Mattis	Richmond	HR	9	James Pool	Norfolk	SO	207
				Joe Vance	Petersburg	PCT	1.000 11-0

1912 Virginia League
schedule

Team standings	W	L	PCT	GB	Manager
Roanoke Tigers	81	55	.596	-	Buck Pressley
Petersburg Goobers	79	54	.594	½	Henry Busch
Richmond Colts	77	55	.579	2	Steve Griffin
Portsmouth Pirates	65	63	.508	12	Lou Castro
Norfolk Tars	67	65	.508	12	Charles Shaffer
Newport News Shipbuilders	46	84	.354	32	John J. Grim / Buck Hooker
Danville Red Sox / Bluefield	16	29	.356	NA	David Gaston
Lynchburg Shoemakers	11	34	.244	NA	Otis Stocksdale / James Kelly; Hugh MacKinnon

Danville moved to Bluefield June 10 and moved back to Danville (1-1) June 13.; Danville and Lynchburg disbanded June 15.

No playoffs held

Player statistics
Player	Team	Stat	Tot	Player	Team	Stat	Tot
Steve Griffin	Richmond	BA	.356	Erskine Mayer	Portsmouth	W	26
Steve Griffin	Richmond	Runs	97	Erskine Mayer	Portsmouth	SO	273
Steve Griffin	Richmond	Hits	167	Erskine Mayer	Portsmouth	PCT	.743 26-9
Steve Griffin	Richmond	RBI	97				
Frank Burke	Richmond	HR	12				

1913 Virginia League

Team standings	W	L	PCT	GB	Manager
Petersburg Goobers	89	46	.659	-	Henry Busch
Roanoke Tigers	82	57	.590	9	Buck Pressley
Richmond Colts	74	60	.552	14½	Steve Griffin
Portsmouth Pirates	57	77	.425	31½	Lee Garvin
Newport News Shipbuilders	53	83	.390	36½	Paul Davis / Harry Matthews
Norfolk Tars	51	83	.381	37½	Charles Shaffer / George Kirscher; Ray Ryan

No playoffs held

Player statistics
Player	Team	Stat	Tot	Player	Team	Stat	Tot
Ralph Mattis	Roanoke	BA	.300	Doc Ayers	Richmond	W	29
Tinsley Ginn	Roanoke	Runs	94	Doc Ayers	Richmond	SO	390
Ralph Mattis	Roanoke	Hits	157	Doc Ayers	Richmond	PCT	.784 29-8
Ralph Mattis	Roanoke	RBI	78				
Tom Tennant	Portsmouth	HR	7				
Jim Barnett	Petersburg	HR	7				
Ducky Eberts	Richmond	HR	7				

1914 Virginia League
schedule

Team standings	W	L	PCT	GB	Manager
Norfolk Tars	93	48	.660	-	Buck Pressley
Richmond Colts	78	56	.582	11½	Ray Ryan
Newport News Shipbuilders	70	69	.504	22	Matt Broderick / Harry Matthews; Harry Spratt
Roanoke Tigers	65	72	.474	26	Otto Mills / Harry Welcher
Petersburg Goobers	63	74	.460	28	Henry Busch
Portsmouth Truckers	46	96	.324	47½	Jesse Tannehill / Joe Holland; Pryor McElveen

No playoffs held

Player statistics
Player	Team	Stat	Tot	Player	Team	Stat	Tot
Buck Thrasher	Norfolk	BA	.325	Cliff Markle	Norfolk	W	31
Art Smith	Norfolk	Runs	96	Cliff Markle	Norfolk	SO	265
Cecil Gray	Richmond	Hits	169	Cliff Markle	Norfolk	ERA	2.53
Cecil Gray	Richmond	RBI	94	Sam Rice	Petersburg	PCT	.818 9-2
Pryor McElveen	Portsmouth	HR	8				

1915 Virginia League
schedule

Team standings	W	L	PCT	GB	Manager
Rocky Mount Carolinians	74	48	.607	-	Ray Ryan
Portsmouth Truckers	68	58	.540	8	Win Clark
Norfolk Tars	66	56	.541	8	Red McMahon
Newport News Shipbuilders	63	62	.504	12½	Carl Carnes / Brooke Crist
Suffolk Tigers	59	62	.488	14½	Harry Welcher / George Kelley
Petersburg Goobers	40	84	.323	35	Harry Busch

Playoff: Rocky Mount 4 games, Portsmouth 1.

Player statistics
Player	Team	Stat	Tot	Player	Team	Stat	Tot
Buck Thrasher	Norfolk	BA	.348	Roy Gardinier	Newport News	W	20
Charles Bittle	Rocky Mount	Runs	117	Roy Gardinier	Newport News	SO	216
Buck Thrasher	Norfolk	Hits	150	Al Leake	Rocky Mount	ERA	2.42
Buck Thrasher	Norfolk	RBI	100	Al Leake	Rocky Mount	PCT	.737 14-5
Carl Gray	Rocky Mount	HR	15				

1916 Virginia League
schedule

Team standings	W	L	PCT	GB	Manager
Newport News Shipbuilders	79	39	.669	-	Brooke Crist / Fred Payne
Portsmouth Truckers	76	42	.644	3	James Fox
Rocky Mount Tar Heels	61	60	.504	19½	Ray Ryan
Petersburg Goobers	54	68	.443	27	George Kelly / William Helfrich
Norfolk Tars	38	77	.330	39½	Red McMahon / Buck Pressley
Hopewell Powder Puffs	30	52	.366	NA	Win Clark / R. Barrett

Hopewell disbanded July 22; Roanoke Rapids was added August 14; Roanoke Rapids was dropped August 16, after winning its only game.
Playoff: Newport News 4 games, Portsmouth 1.

Player statistics
Player	Team	Stat	Tot	Player	Team	Stat	Tot
Manuel Cueto	Portsmouth	BA	.321	William Wood	Portsmouth	W	22
Al Moore	Portsmouth	Runs	71	Clarence Teague	Rocky Mount	SO	205
Manuel Cueto	Portsmouth	Hits	126	John Voss	Newport News	ERA	1.89
Rasty Walters	Newport News	RBI	100	John Voss	Newport News	PCT	.792 19-5
Rasty Walters	Newport News	HR	15				

1917 Virginia League
schedule

Team standings	W	L	PCT	GB	Manager
Newport News Shipbuilders	10	5	.667	-	Fred Payne
Portsmouth Truckers	9	7	.563	1½	James Fox
Lynchburg Shoemakers	7	7	.500	2½	Joe Stanley
Norfolk Tars	7	9	.438	3½	Art Devlin
Petersburg Goobers	6	8	.429	3½	Hamilton Reynolds
Rocky Mount Tar Heels	6	9	.400	4	Ray Ryan

League disbanded May 15.

Player statistics
Player	Team	Stat	Tot	Player	Team	Stat	Tot
Harry Hartsell	Norfolk	BA	.378	Frank Jarman	Rocky Mount	W	4
Brooke Crist	Portsmouth	Runs	29	Louis Magalis	Norfolk	W	4
Harry Hartsell	Norfolk	Hits	48	Carl Ray	Newport News	W	4
Brooke Crist	Newport News	RBI	14	Carl Ray	Newport News	SO	57
Brooke Crist	Newport News	HR	3	Carl Ray	Newport News	PCT	1.000 4-0
				Bob Wood	Portsmouth	ERA	1.27

1918 Virginia League
schedule

Team standings	W	L	PCT	GB	Manager
Richmond Colts	29	21	.580	-	George Stinson
Newport News Shipbuilders	28	21	.571	½	Roy Whitcraft
Petersburg Goobers	27	22	.551	1½	Burleigh Emery
Norfolk Tars	13	33	.239	14	Art Devlin

League folded in late June.

Player statistics
Player	Team	Stat	Tot	Player	Team	Stat	Tot
Curt Daughton	Newport News	BA	.328	Edwin Tomlin	Newport News	W	10
Curt Daughton	Newport News	Runs	38	George Jackson	Richmond	SO	83
Curt Daughton	Newport News	Hits	62	Chet Llewellyn	Newport News	ERA	2.48
Curt Daughton	Newport News	RBI	46	Joe Trivett	Newport News	PCT	.800 4-1
Curt Daughton	Newport News	HR	3				

1919 Virginia League
schedule

Team standings	W	L	PCT	GB	Manager
Petersburg Goobers	62	47	.569	-	Amby McConnell
Richmond Colts	60	50	.545	2½	Frank Dobson / Chief Bender
Portsmouth Truckers	57	51	.528	4½	Eddie Hooper
Norfolk Tars	58	53	.523	5	William Schwartz
Suffolk Nuts	49	58	.458	12	Rube Oldring
Newport News Shipbuilders	42	69	.378	21	Roy Whitcraft

No playoffs held

Player statistics
Player	Team	Stat	Tot	Player	Team	Stat	Tot
Amby McConnell	Petersburg	BA	.338	Chief Bender	Richmond	W	29
Hal Leathers	Norfolk	Runs	71	Chief Bender	Richmond	SO	295
Jim Poole	Richmond	Hits	127	Orion Mitchell	Norfolk	ERA	1.09
Jack Ballinger	Norfolk	HR	5	Chief Bender	Richmond	PCT	.935 29-2
Jack Ballinger	Norfolk	RBI	90				

=== 1920 to 1928 Class B ===
1920 Virginia League
schedule

Team standings	W	L	PCT	GB	Manager
Richmond Colts	76	38	.667	-	Lee Gooch
Portsmouth Truckers	73	45	.619	5	James Barton / Jim Viox
Petersburg Goobers	68	50	.576	10	Tommy Clarke
Norfolk Mary Janes	54	59	.478	21½	William Schwartz / Heinie Wagner
Rocky Mount Tar Heels	53	66	.445	25½	Al Bridwell / Phifer Fullenwider
Newport News Shipbuilders	51	68	.429	27½	Joe Wall / Jim Brannigan; William Schwartz / Harry Lake
Suffolk Nuts	47	69	.405	30	Gabby Street
Wilson Bugs	44	71	.383	32½	John Castle

Playoff: Portsmouth 4 games, Richmond 3.

Player statistics
Player	Team	Stat	Tot	Player	Team	Stat	Tot
Rasty Walters	Wilson	BA	.435	Paul Bennett	Petersburg	W	25
Irving Smith	Richmond	Runs	90	William McGloughlin	Portsmouth	SO	155
Henry Roth	Wilson	Hits	154	Lee Stone	Richmond	ERA	1.47
Lee Gooch	Richmond	HR	8	Mike Kircher	Richmond	PCT	.895 17-2
Pie Traynor	Portsmouth	HR	8				
Luke Stewart	Richmond	HR	8				

1921 Virginia League
schedule

Team standings	W	L	PCT	GB	Manager
Wilson Bugs	74	52	.587	-	Tommy Clarke
Portsmouth Truckers	78	56	.582	-	Jim Viox
Rocky Mount Tar Heels	77	57	.575	1	Phifer Fullenwider / Frank Walker
Richmond Colts	74	58	.561	3	Ray Ryan
Norfolk Tars	74	64	.536	6	Jack Warhop
Suffolk Wildcats	59	78	.431	20½	Gabby Street / William Cunningham
Newport News Shipbuilders	52	81	.391	25½	Harry Lake
Petersburg Goobers / Tarboro Tarbabies	46	88	.343	32	Bill Martin / Amby McConnell

Petersburg moved to Tarboro August 2; Rocky Mount & Wilson first half overturned, title to Portsmouth.
Playoff: Portsmouth 4 games, Norfolk 1.

Player statistics
Player	Team	Stat	Tot	Player	Team	Stat	Tot
Jim Viox	Portsmouth	BA	.370	Bill McGloughlin	Portsmouth	W	25
Ben Spencer	Rocky Mount	Runs	153	Al Benton	Portsmouth	SO	196
Ben Spencer	Rocky Mount	Hits	194	Leroy Finnegan	Richmond	PCT	.857 18-3
Joe Kelly	Norfolk	HR	17				

1922 Virginia League

Team standings	W	L	PCT	GB	Manager
Wilson Bugs	68	52	.567	-	Tommy Clarke / Bunny Hearn
Newport News Shipbuilders	63	56	.529	4½	Roy Whitcraft
Norfolk Tars	58	57	.504	7½	Win Clark
Rocky Mount Tar Heels	60	61	.496	8½	Frank Walker
Portsmouth Truckers	57	61	.483	10	Jim Viox
Richmond Colts	49	68	.419	17½	Ray Ryan / John Keller; Rube Oldring

No playoffs held

Player statistics
Player	Team	Stat	Tot	Player	Team	Stat	Tot
Rasty Walters	Wilson	BA	.374	Bill Manning	Portsmouth	W	20
Elmer Yoter	Portsmouth	Runs	98	Roy Stickradt	Newport News	SO	158
Rasty Walters	Wilson	Hits	173	Chester Lucas	Newport News	PCT	.704 19-8
Harry Swacina	Rocky Mount	RBI	88				
Bill Narlesky	Rocky Mount	HR	15				

1923 Virginia League
schedule

Team standings	W	L	PCT	GB	Manager
Wilson Tobacconists	70	52	.774	-	Rube Oldring
Richmond Colts	71	53	.773	-	Dave Robertson
Rocky Mount Tar Heels	63	59	.516	7	Frank Walker
Norfolk Tars	62	60	.508	8	Win Clark
Portsmouth Truckers	58	62	.483	11	Ed Goosetree
Petersburg Trunkmakers	43	81	.347	28	George Block / Baldy Altermatt

No playoffs held

Player statistics
Player	Team	Stat	Tot	Player	Team	Stat	Tot
Hack Wilson	Portsmouth	BA	.388	Alex Peterson	Norfolk	W	22
Frank Walker	Rocky Mount	Runs	126	Alex Peterson	Norfolk	SO	129
Frank Walker	Rocky Mount	Hits	177	Bill Manning	Richmond	PCT	.727 16-6
Hack Wilson	Portsmouth	RBI	101				
Hack Wilson	Portsmouth	HR	19				

1924 Virginia League
schedule

Team standings	W	L	PCT	GB	Manager
Richmond Colts	76	59	.563	-	Jack Onslow
Portsmouth Truckers	75	60	.555	1	Ed Goosetree
Rocky Mount Broncos	74	62	.544	2½	Frank Walker
Norfolk Tars	69	66	.511	7	Win Clark
Wilson Bugs	66	70	.485	10½	Moose Marshall / Les Nunamaker
Petersburg Goobers	46	89	.340	30	Ed Konetchy

No playoffs held

Player statistics
Player	Team	Stat	Tot	Player	Team	Stat	Tot
Frank Walker	Rocky Mount	BA	.370	Cecil Duff	Rocky Mount	W	23
Frank Walker	Rocky Mount	Runs	117	Frank Dodson	Richmond	SO	153
Ben Mallonee	Richmond	Hits	201	Ken Ash	Rocky Mount	ERA	2.39
Ed Konetchy	Petersburg	RBI	98	Cy Fried	Norfolk	PCT	.692 18-8
Ed Konetchy	Petersburg	HR	33				

1925 Virginia League
schedule

Team standings	W	L	PCT	GB	Manager
Richmond Colts	78	54	.591	-	Percy Dawson / Guy Lacy
Portsmouth Truckers	73	59	.553	5	Lester Bangs
Norfolk Tars	72	60	.545	6	Dave Robertson
Wilson Bugs	68	64	.515	10	Winnie Winston
Rocky Mount Broncos	53	79	.402	25	Jim Viox / Bill Pike
Kinston Eagles	52	80	.394	26	Johnny Nee

No playoffs held

Player statistics
Player	Team	Stat	Tot	Player	Team	Stat	Tot
Hal Weafer	Richmond	BA	.391	Ben Shields	Richmond	W	21
Guy Lacy	Richmond	Runs	120	Ben Shields	Richmond	SO	187
Arthur Hauger	Kinston	Hits	183	Cy Fried	Norfolk	ERA	2.87
Dave Robertson	Norfolk	RBI	118	Alex Peterson	Norfolk	PCT	1.000 11-0
Blackie Carter	Richmond	HR	38				

1926 Virginia League
schedule

Team standings	W	L	PCT	GB	Manager
Richmond Colts	85	68	.556	-	Troy Agnew / Guy Lacy; Rube Oldring
Wilson Bugs	85	69	.552	½	Bunny Hearn
Norfolk Tars	79	73	.520	5½	Dave Robertson
Portsmouth Truckers	74	78	.487	10½	Lester Bangs
Kinston Eagles	69	83	.454	15½	Johnny Nee
Petersburg Broncos	66	87	.431	19	Charles Connolly / Tom Abbott

No playoffs held

Player statistics
Player	Team	Stat	Tot	Player	Team	Stat	Tot
Dave Robertson	Norfolk	BA	.382	Alex Peterson	Norfolk	W	22
Dick Attreau	Norfolk	Runs	154	Herm Kemner	Richmond	SO	152
Dick Attreau	Norfolk	Hits	225	Bunny Hearn	Wilson	ERA	2.68
Dave Robertson	Norfolk	RBI	127	Herm Kemner	Richmond	PCT	.724 21-8
Pete Stack	Richmond	HR	44				

1927 Virginia League
schedule

Team standings	W	L	PCT	GB	Manager
Portsmouth Truckers	76	52	.594	-	Zinn Beck
Petersburg Broncos	72	61	.541	6½	Olin Perritt
Richmond Colts	65	65	.500	12	Ed Mooers / Lew McCarty
Wilson Bugs	65	67	.492	13	Bunny Hearn
Norfolk Tars	58	72	.446	19	Dave Robertson
Kinston Eagles	56	75	.427	21½	Mike Konnick / Arthur Hauger

No playoffs held

Player statistics
Player	Team	Stat	Tot	Player	Team	Stat	Tot
Earl Clark	Richmond	BA	.386	Frank Riel	Wilson	W	20
Jack Bandrimer	Portsmouth	Runs	123	Ken Ash	Petersburg	SO	109
Jack Bandrimer	Portsmouth	Hits	179	Ken Ash	Petersburg	ERA	2.78
George Thrasher	Petersburg	RBI	114	June Green	Portsmouth	PCT	.731 19-7
Pete Stack	Richmond	HR	24				
George Thomas	Portsmouth	HR	24				

1928 Virginia League

Team standings	W	L	PCT	GB	Manager
Norfolk Tars	26	13	.667	-	Zinn Beck
Portsmouth Truckers	25	14	.641	1	Stump Edington
Petersburg Broncos	15	27	.357	12½	Earl Hanson
Richmond Colts	15	27	.357	12½	Olin Perritt / Chief Bender

League disbanded June 3.

Player statistics
Player	Team	Stat	Tot	Player	Team	Stat	Tot
Arthur Crump	Norfolk	BA	.381	Joe Heving	Portsmouth	W	8
Carr Smith	Norfolk	Runs	41	Jim Turner	Norfolk	W	8
Hank Collenberger	Norfolk	Hits	74	Pat Townsend	Norfolk	SO	51
Hank Collenberger	Norfolk	RBI	40	John Heving	Portsmouth	ERA	1.61
Bill Hohman	Richmond	HR	7				
