= Newport News Shipbuilders =

- 1900–1922; (1900–1901, 1911–1922); Newport News, Virginia

Minor league affiliations
- Class: Class D (1900, 1911); Class C (1901, 1912–1920); Class B (1920–1922)
- League: Virginia League (1900); Virginia-North Carolina League (1901); Tidewater League (1911); Virginia League (1912–1922)

Major league affiliations
- Team: None

Minor league titles
- League titles (2): 1916; 1917
- Conference titles (1): 1916

Team data
- Name: Newport News Shipbuilders (1900–1901); Newport News (1911); Newport News Shipbuilders (1912–1922)
- Ballpark: Lincoln Park (1900–1901); Horowitz Field (1911–1922)

The Newport News Shipbuilders were a minor league baseball team based in Newport News, Virginia. The Shipbuilders first played as members of the Virginia League in 1900 and the 1901 Virginia-North Carolina League. Newport News then resumed minor league play in the 1911 season as a member of the short lived Tidewater League before the Shipbuilders returned to the Virginia League, playing in the league from 1912 to 1922. The Shipbuilders won consecutive Virginia League championships in 1916 and 1917. The Newport News Shipbuilders teams hosted minor league home games at Lincoln Park and Horowitz Park.

== History ==
=== 1900 & 1901: two leagues and a tornado ===
Minor league baseball began in Newport News when the 1894 Newport News-Hampton Deckhands played a partial season as members of the Virginia League. The Newport News "Shipbuilders" followed as the next minor league team based in Newport News, beginning play in 1900.

The 1900 Newport News "Shipbuilders" began play as members of the six–team, Class D level Virginia League. Newport News joined the Hampton Crabs, Norfolk Phenoms, Petersburg Farmers, Portsmouth Boers and Richmond Bluebirds in beginning league play on April 30, 1900.

The Newport News "Shipbuilders" nickname corresponds to local industry, history and geography. Located in the Virginia Peninsula and along the James River, the city has long been home to the shipbuilding industry. Today, it hosts the Huntington Ingalls Industries Shipbuilding company and Newport News Shipbuilding, the largest military ship building company in the United States. Newport News is home to The Mariners' Museum and Park. The museum is located at 100 Museum Drive in Newport News, Virginia.

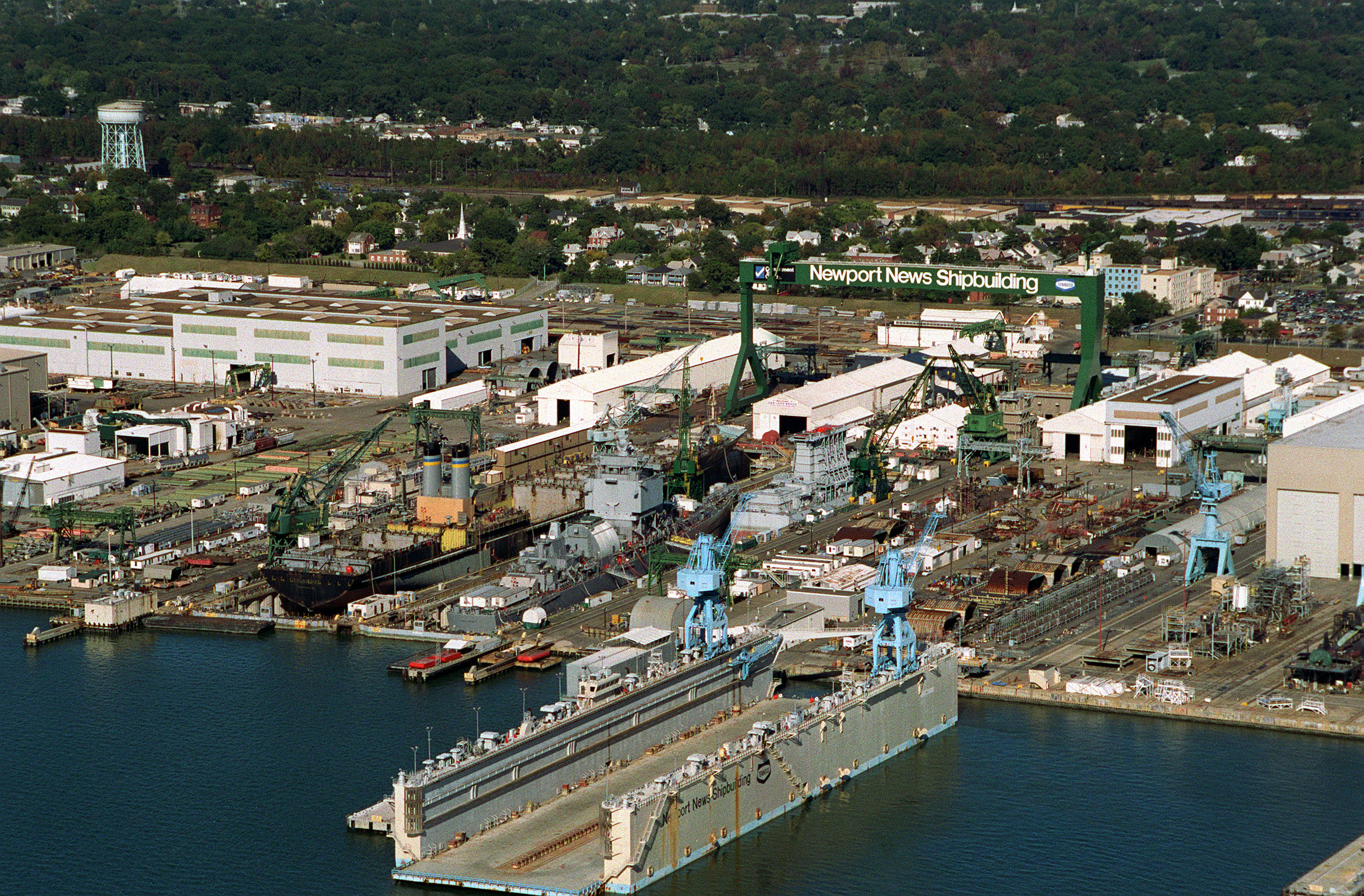
(1994) Aerial view of the Newport News shipyard. Visible in the drydocks are USS Long Beach and USNS Gilliland

On July 11, 1900, the Virginia League folded after Petersburg and Richmond had already folded in mid-June. The Shipbuilders placed fourth in the Atlantic League standings in the shortened season. When the league folded, Newport News ended the season with a record of 23–39, playing the season under managers Hunter Harvey, Mike Trost and Kid Weaver. The Shipbuilders finished the season 22.0 games behind the first place Norfolk Phenoms, who were led by Christy Mathewson, in the final standings.

In 1901, the shipbuilders were affected by a natural disaster as the team played in a newly named league. In 1901, the Virginia League evolved into the Class C level Virginia–North Carolina League. The Virginia League cities of New Port News Portsmouth and Richmond franchises continued play in the 1901 Virginia–North Carolina League, joining three new franchises.

The new Virginia–North Carolina League was formed on February 18, 1901. In a league meeting at the Monticello Hotel in Norfolk, Virginia, W.H. Cunningham was elected president and E.H. Doran selected as secretary. The league was formed with six teams, four from Virginia and two from North Carolina, resulting in the name change for the league.

The six-team Virginia–North Carolina League began play on April 16, 1901. The Norfolk Skippers, Portsmouth Browns, Raleigh Senators, Richmond Bluebirds and Wilmington Giants teams joined the Shipbuilders in league play.

On May 1, 1901, a tornado hit Newport News, Virginia. Home attendance was diminished as a result. On June 21, 1901, the team relocated from Newport News to Charlotte, North Carolina with a 32-21 record. Completing the season as the Charlotte Hornets, the team ended the season in third place with a 50-55 overall record, 9.0 games behind first place Raleigh. Ed Ashenback served as manager in both locations. The Virginia-North Carolina league did not return to play in 1902.

=== 1911: Tidewater League ===
The Shipbuilders were succeeded by the 1911 "Newport News" team, resuming minor league play as members of the Class D level Tidewater League, which began league play on May 11, 1911. The six–team league was composed of charter teams, all without known monikers, representing Elizabeth City, North Carolina and the Virginia cities of Hampton, Newport News, Old Point Comfort, Portsmouth and Suffolk.

On May 4, 1911, Newport News pitcher Ralph Davie threw a no-hitter. Davie defeated Norfolk at Norfolk by the score of 12-0 in the game. Davie walked one hitter.

The Tidewater League regular season ended on August 1, 1911. The Elizabeth City and Portsmouth teams had folded earlier the season. Newport News was in fourth place when the season ended, playing under manager Hugh Shannon. Newport News ended with a final record of 10–11 finish 7.0 games behind the Tidewater League champion Suffolk team. The Tidewater League permanently folded after the 1911 season.

Beginning with the 1911 season, Newport News began hosting minor league home games at Horowitz Field. The ballpark remained home to the Shipbuilders teams through the 1922 season.

=== 1912 to 1922: Virginia League ===
In 1912, the Newport News Shipbuilders reformed, and the franchise rejoined the Virginia League. The Class C level league began the season with the Danville Red Sox, Lynchburg Shoemakers, Norfolk Tars, Petersburg Goobers, Portsmouth Pirates, Richmond Colts and Roanoke Tigers teams joined Newport News in beginning league play on April 18, 1912.

In their first season after rejoining the Virginia League, the Newport News Shipbuilders ended the 1912 season with a record of 46-84. Managed by John Grim and Buck Hooker, the Shipbuilders ended the season in sixth place, which was last after the Danville and Richmond teams folded during the season. Newport News finished 32.0 games behind first place Roanoke.

The 1913 Shipbuilders placed fifth in the six-team Virginia League. Newport had a final record of 53–83, playing the season under managers Paul Davis and Harry Mathews. The Shipbuilders finished 36.5 games behind the first place Petersburg Goobers.

With a third-place finish in the 1914 Virginia League, the Shipbuilders finished above .500 for the first time. Newport News ended the season with a 70–69 record. With the returning Harry Mathews, Matt Broderick and Harry Spratt serving as managers, the Shipbuilders finished 22.5 games behind the first place Norfolk Tars.

Newport News pitcher Carroll Barton threw a no hitter on August 26, 1914. Barton and the Shipbuilders defeated Petersburg 11-0 in the contest. Barton struck out 4 and walked 3 in the victory at Petersburg.

The 1915 Shipbuilders finished above .500 for the second consecutive Virginia League season. The team also had a 20-game winning pitcher. Newport News ended the season with an overall record of 63–62, as Carl Carnes and Brook Crist managed the team during the season. The Virginia League began a split-season schedule with the winners meeting in a playoff. Placing fourth in the six-team Class D league, Newport News ended the season 11.5 games behind the eventual champion Rocky Mount Carolinians. Shipbuilders' pitcher Roy Gardinier led the Virginia League with both 20 wins and 216 strikeouts.

==== 1916 & 1917:Championship seasons ====
In 1916, the Newport News Shipbuilders won both the Virginia League second half pennant and the league championship. Under returning manager Brook Crist and Fred Payne, the Shipbuilders ended the regular season in first place with a 79–39 record, which was the best overall record in the league. Newport News finished 3.0 games ahead of the second place Portsmouth Foxes in the six-team league. In the playoff, Newport News defeated Portsmouth 4 games to 1 to capture the league championship. Rasty Walters of Newport News hit 15 home runs to lead the Virginia League in 1916.

The Shipbuilders won a second consecutive Virginia League championship in 1917, in a brief season. After beginning play on April 26, 1917, the Virginia League folded for the season on May 16, 1917, with World War I affecting many minor leagues. In their brief season Newport News had a 10–5 record when the league folded. With Brock Crist continuing as the team player/manager, the Shipbuilders were 1.5 games ahead of the Portsmouth Truckers in the six-team league.

==== 1918 to 1922 ====
The Virginia League returned to play briefly in 1918, beginning the season as a four-team, Class C league and suspending operations during the season. There were only ten total minor leagues that began play in 1918 due to World War I, and nine of the leagues suspended their seasons. Newport News played with Norfolk, Petersburg and Richmond in the Virginia League. On July 20, 1918, the Virginia League stopped play. At the time, the Shipbuilders were in second place, just 0.5 game behind the Richmond Colts. The Shipbuilders ended the season with a 28–21 record, managed by Roy Whitcraft.

In the 1919 season, the Virginia League returned to a six-team Class C league and the Shipbuilders ended the season in last place. With Roy Whitcraft returning as manager, Newport News placed sixth with a 42–69 record. The Shipbuilders finished 21.0 games behind the pennant winning Petersburg Goobers. Petersburg won the league championship when the playoffs were cancelled due to disagreements.

The Virginia League expanded in 1920 and went up a class level. The league expanded to eight teams, adding the Rocky Mount Tar Heels and Wilson Bugs teams and became a Class B level league. Playing under four managers, the Newport News Shipbuilders placed sixth in the final standings. Compiling a record of 51–68, the Shipbuilders were managed by Joe Wall, James Brannigan, William Schwartz and Harry Lake in finishing 27.5 games behind the Richmond Colts, who lost to Portsmouth in the playoff.

The 1921 Virginia League continued as an eight-team Class B level league, with the Shipbuilders finishing the regular season in seventh place. Harry Lake returned as manager, as Newport News ended the regular season with a record of 52–81. The eventual champion Portsmouth Truckers finished 25.5 games ahead of Newport News.

In their final season of play as the "Shipbuilders," Newport News finished in second place as the 1922 Virginia League reduced to six teams and remained a Class B level league. With Roy Whitcraft returning to manage the team, the Shipbuilders ended the season with a record of 63–56. No playoffs were held, as the Wison Bugs had the leagues' best record, finishing 4.5 games ahead of second place Newport News. Newport News did not return to play in the 1923 Virginia League and were replaced by the Petersburg Trunkmakers.

Nearly two decades later, minor league baseball returned to Newport News in 1941, with the Newport News Pilots. After reforming in 1939, the 1941 Virginia League expanded to six teams and played as a Class C level league, adding the Newport News Pilots and Petersburg Rebels teams to the league. The Newport News Pilots and Rebels were joined by the Harrisonburg Turks, Lynchburg Senators, Salem-Roanoke Friends and Staunton Presidents in beginning league play on May 2, 1941.

== The ballparks ==
In 1900 and 1901, Newport News teams played their home minor league games at Lincoln Park. The ballpark was located at 6th Street & Jefferson Avenue in Newport News. The ballpark was along the waterfront of the Hampton Roads. The site is still in use today as a public park, known as King-Lincoln Park. King-Lincoln Park is located at 600 Jefferson Avenue in Newport News, Virginia.

Beginning in 1911, Newport News hosted minor league home games at Horowitz Field. The park was also known as League Park and City Park from 1916 to 1921. The player clubhouse was located behind centerfield. The ballpark was demolished by 1926. In the era, the ballpark was bordered by Wichham Street & Orcutt Street between 28th street & 30th Street on Virginia Avenue, which is called Warwick Boulevard today. Today, the former Doris Miller Community Center building is located on the former ballpark site. The community center is scheduled to be demolished un 2023 and replaced with a new community resource center building and other amenities on the site. The former Doris Miller Community Center & Swimming Pool facilities are located at 2800 Warwick Boulevard in Newport News, Virginia.

== Timeline ==
Year(s)	# Yrs.	Team	Level	League	Ballpark
1900	1	Newport News Shipbuilders	Class D	Virginia League	Lincoln Park
1901	1	Newport News Shipbuilders	Class C	Virginia-North Carolina League	Lincoln Park
1911	1	Newport News	Class D	Tidewater League	Horowitz Field
1912-1919	8	Newport News Shipbuilders	Class C	Virginia League	Horowitz Field
1920-1922	3	Newport News Shipbuilders	Class B	Virginia League	Horowitz Field

== Year–by–year records ==
Year	Record	Finish	Manager	Playoffs/Notes
1900	23–39	4th	Hunter Harvey / Mike Trost; Kid Weaver	League folded July 11
1901	50–55	3rd	Ed Ashenback	Newport News (32-21) moved to Charlotte June 21
1911	10–11	4th	Hugh Shannon	League folded August 1
1912	46–84	6th	John Grim / Buck Hooker	No playoffs held
1913	53–83	5th	Paul Davis / Harry Mathews	No playoffs held
1914	70–69	3rd	Harry Mathews / Matt Broderick; Harry Spratt	No playoffs held
1915	63–62	4th	Carl Carnes / Brook Crist	Did not qualify
1916	79–39	1st	Brook Crist / Fred Payne	Won pennant League champions
1917	10–5	1st	Brock Crist	League disbanded May 16; League champions
1918	28–21	2nd	Roy Whitcraft	League suspended play July 20
1919	42–69	6th	Roy Whitcraft	No playoffs held
1920	51–68	6th	Joe Wall / James Brannigan; William Schwartz / Harry Lake	Did not qualify
1921	52–81	7th	Harry Lake	Did not qualify
1922	63–56	2nd	Roy Whitcraft	No playoffs held

== Notable alumni ==
- Ray Bates (1912)
- Clarence Berger (1915)
- Elmer Brown (1918)
- Matt Broderick (1914, MGR)
- Andy Bruckmiller (1912)
- Nick Carter (1913)
- Bill Clay (1900)
- Jake Drauby (1901)
- Joe Fitzgerald (1919)
- Cy Fried (1920)
- Charlie Gettig (1901)
- Norm Glockson (1914)
- Johnny Gooch (1919)
- Hunter Harvey (1900, MGR)
- Harry Hedgpeth (1914)
- Ty Helfrich (1916)
- Ed High (1901)
- Izzy Hoffman (1900)
- Buck Hooker (1901; 1911, MGR)
- Buck Hopkins (1915-1916, 1920)
- Rudy Hulswitt (1900)
- Scotty Ingerton (1916)
- George Keefe (1900)
- John Kull (1913)
- Tom Lipp (1901)
- Charlie Luskey (1912)
- Ralph Mattis (1912)
- Bill McCabe (1914)
- Harry McCluskey (1918)
- Moxie Meixell (1914)
- Jim Murray (1901)
- Champ Osteen (1901)
- Fred Ostendorf (1916)
- Fred Payne (1916, MGR; 1917)
- Carl Ray (1916-1917, 1921)
- Bill Richardson (1900)
- Lance Richbourg (1918)
- Johnny Schulte (1916)
- Harry Spratt (1914, MGR)
- Joe Stanley (1900)
- Pinky Swander (1901)
- Mike Trost (1900, MGR)
- Bucky Veil (1901)
- Doc Waldbauer (1916)
- Frank Walker (1915-1916)
- Joe Wall (1920, MGR)
- Allie Watt (1916)

== See also ==
Newport News Shipbuilders players
