= Clarence Berger =

American baseball player (1894–1959)

- Outfielder
- Born: November 1, 1894; East Cleveland, Ohio, U.S.
- Died: June 30, 1959 (aged 64); Washington, D.C., U.S.
- Batted: Left Threw: Right

MLB debut
- September 23, 1914, for the Pittsburgh Pirates

Last MLB appearance
- October 4, 1914, for the Pittsburgh Pirates

MLB statistics
- Batting average: .077
- Hits: 1
- Runs scored: 2
- Stats at Baseball Reference

Teams
- Pittsburgh Pirates (1914)

Clarence Edward Berger (November 1, 1894 – June 30, 1959) was an American professional baseball player whose career spanned two seasons (1914–15). During that one season, Berger played for the minor league Richmond Colts and the major league Pittsburgh Pirates during the 1914 season. He also played for the minor league Newport News Shipbuilders during the 1915 season. Berger batted left-handed, while throwing right. During his playing career, he stood at 6 feet (180 cm) and weighed in at 185 pounds (84 kg). Before turning professional, Berger attended the University of Richmond in Richmond, Virginia, where he played baseball on the school's team.

== Early life ==
Berger was born on November 1, 1894, in East Cleveland, Ohio, to Charles A. and Della E. of West Virginia, and Ohio, respectively. Charles A. Berger worked as a foreman at the local U.S. Naval Yard. Clarence Berger had one sibling, Howard S. Berger. During the spring of 1914, Clarence Berger graduated from the University of Richmond, where he played on the school's baseball team as an outfielder, and catcher.

== Professional career ==
At the start of the 1914 season, Berger signed with the Class-C Richmond Colts of the Virginia League. With the Colts, he batted .298 with 154 hits, 13 doubles, 12 triples, and two home runs in 136 games played. Berger finished second in the league in hits, and triples. On August 22, the Pittsburgh Pirates purchased Berger's contract from the Richmond Colts for US$2,500, the largest sum a player from the Virginia League had ever gone for. Berger was told to report to the Pirates following the end of the Virginia League season. On September 16, following the Virginia League season, Berger failed to report to Pittsburgh. Eventually, Berger did report, and he made his Major League Baseball (MLB) debut on September 23, 1914. On the season, he batted .077 with two runs scored, and one hit in six games played. Defensively, he played in the outfield for the Pirates.

On February 14, 1915, Berger was released by the Pittsburgh Pirates. It was announced that he would join the newly formed Richmond Climbers of the International League that season. However, Richmond farmed Berger to the Class-C Newport News Shipbuilders of the Virginia League that season. Berger had previously made a verbal agreement to join the Class-C Norfolk Tars, but could not break his agreement with Newport News to do so. With the Shipbuilders, be batted .172 with 15 hits, one double, and one triple in 23 games played.

== Later life ==
In 1930, Berger was working as a bookkeeper in Fairfax County, Virginia. By 1942, Berger was living in Arlington County, Virginia, with his brother Dr. Howard S. Berger. At the time, Berger was unemployed. Clarence Berger died on June 30, 1959, at the age of 64 in Washington, D.C. He was buried at Mount Olivet Cemetery in Frederick, Maryland.
