= Portsmouth, Virginia minor league baseball history =

Portsmouth, Virginia minor league baseball teams
- 1895–1968; (1895–1897, 1900–1901, 1906–1910, 1912–1917, 1919–1928, 1935–1955, 1961–1968); Portsmouth, Virginia

Minor league affiliations
- Class: Class B (1895–1896); Class D (1900); Class C (1901, 1906–1909); Class D (1911); Class C (1912–1919); Class B (1920–1928, 1935–1955); Class A (1961–1968)
- League: Virginia League I (1895–1897); Virginia League II (1900); Virginia–North Carolina League (1901); Virginia League III (1912–1917, 1919–1928); Piedmont League (1935–1955); South Atlantic League (1961–1962); Carolina League (1963–1968)

Major league affiliations
- Team: Chicago Cubs (1936–1938); Philadelphia Phillies (1939–1940); Chicago Cubs (1941–1947)

Minor league titles
- League titles (2): 1945; 1965
- Conference titles (2): 1943; 1950
- Wild card berths (3): 1964; 1967; 1968

Team data
- Name: Portsmouth Truckers (1895); Portsmouth Browns (1896–1897); Portsmouth Boers (1900); Portsmouth Browns (1901); Portsmouth Truckers (1906–1910); Portsmouth Pirates (1912–1913); Portsmouth Truckers (1914–1917, 1919–1928, 1935); Portsmouth Cubs (1936–1952); Portsmouth Merrimacs (1953–1955); Portsmouth-Norfolk Tides (1961–1968)
- Ballpark: High Street Park (1895–1897, 1900–1901, 1906–1910, 1912–1917, 1919–1920 ) Sewanee Stadium (1921–1928, 1935); Lawrence Stadium (1936–1955, 1961–1968)

Minor League Baseball teams were based in Portsmouth, Virginia, in various seasons between 1895 and 1968. Early Portsmouth teams, called the Portsmouth Truckers, Portsmouth Pirates and Portsmouth Browns were Virginia League members based in Portsmouth, playing between 1895 and 1928. The Portsmouth Cubs were affiliates of the Chicago Cubs and the Philadelphia Phillies, playing in the Class B level Piedmont League from 1935 to 1955. The team became the Portsmouth Merrimacs from 1953 to 1955.

Portsmouth hosted the Portsmouth-Norfolk Tides from 1961 to 1968, with the franchise evolving into the Tidewater Tides and eventually today's Class AAA level Norfolk Tides.

Baseball Hall of Fame members Pie Traynor (1920), Hack Wilson (1923) and Buck Leonard (1953) played for Portsmouth, while Jimmie Foxx (1944) and Tony Lazzeri (1942) served as managers of the Portsmouth Cubs. Actor Chuck Connors played for Portsmouth in 1942 and 1946.

== History ==
The Portsmouth Truckers began play in 1935 as members of the Piedmont League, joining the Asheville Tourists, Durham Bulls, Norfolk Tars, Richmond Colts and Rocky Mount Red Sox. Portsmouth changed their moniker to "Cubs" in 1936. Portsmouth remained a member of the Piedmont League until the league itself folded after the 1955 season.

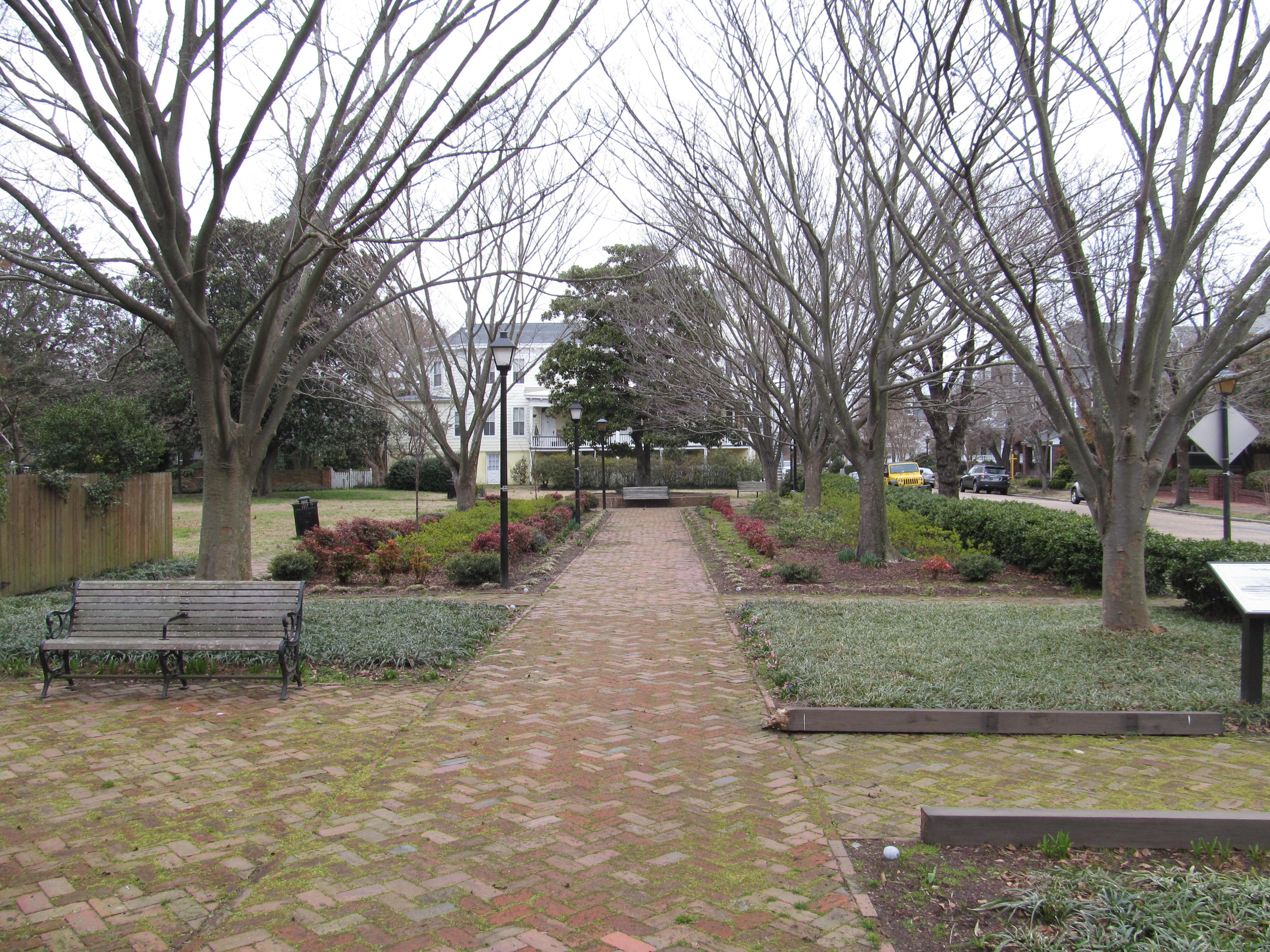
(2013) Portsmouth, Virginia

Earlier, Portsmouth had played in the different incarnations of the Virginia League. The first team in Portsmouth was the Portsmouth Truckers in 1985. Portsmouth fielded teams in the Virginia League in 1895–1897, 1900–1901, 1912–1917 and 1919–1928.

Portsmouth teams were affiliates of the Chicago Cubs from 1936 to 1938, the Philadelphia Phillies from 1939 to 1940 and the Chicago Cubs from 1941 to 1947.

Later, Portsmouth was home of the Portsmouth-Norfolk Tides, who played in the Class A level South Atlantic League (1961–1962) and the Class A Carolina League (1963–1968). The franchise played one last season in Portsmouth when the Jacksonville Suns of the Class AAA level International League moved there in 1969. The franchise relocated permanently to neighboring Norfolk, Virginia, in 1970 to become the Tidewater Tides of the International League (1969-1992), evolving into today's Class AAA Norfolk Tides.

Baseball Hall of Fame members Jimmie Foxx (1944) and Tony Lazzeri (1942) both managed and played briefly for Portsmouth. Hall of Famer and Negro leagues star Buck Leonard, played for Portsmouth in 1953 at age 45 (hitting .333 in 10 games) and Hall of Famers Hack Wilson (1923, hit .388 in 115 games) and Pie Traynor (1920, hit.270 in 110 games) also played for Portsmouth. Actor and 2-sport professional athlete Chuck Connors played for Portsmouth in 1942 and 1946.

Portsmouth won the Piedmont League championship in 1945 and regular season pennants in 1943 and 1950.

== The ballparks ==
Beginning in 1936, Portsmouth teams played at Lawrence Stadium, originally called Portsmouth Stadium, which was demolished in 1997. The stadium was named for Frank Lawrence, owner of the Portsmouth Cubs and Merrimacs. Previous teams had played exclusively at Sewanee Stadium, which was built in 1921. Piedmont still played a few games each season at Sewanee Stadium after Lawrence Stadium was constructed. Sewanee Stadium was located near the corner of Washington and Lincoln Streets in Portsmouth, Virginia. Initially, teams played at High Street Park.

Frank Lawrence often leased Lawrence Stadium to Joe Lewis, a former Negro leagues player. Lewis would organize exhibitions with Negro league teams such the Indianapolis Clowns, Kansas City Monarchs and the Homestead Grays, with Hall of Famer Josh Gibson. Gibson once hit a home run at Lawrence Stadium that was said to have cleared the football press box and landed on Glasgow Street, traveling an estimated 585 feet. Gibson's Grays teammate, Hall of Famer Buck Leonard, later played for Portsmouth.

== Notable alumni ==
=== Baseball Hall of Fame alumni ===
- Jimmie Foxx (1944, MGR) Inducted, 1951
- Tony Lazzeri (1942, MGR) Inducted, 1991
- Buck Leonard (1953) Inducted, 1972
- Pie Traynor (1920) Inducted, 1948
- Hack Wilson (1923) Inducted, 1979

=== Notable alumni ===
- Larry Benton (1921)
- Harry Brecheen (1937) 2× MLB All-Star; St. Louis Cardinals Hall of Fame
- Smoky Burgess (1945) 9× MLB All-Star; Cincinnati Reds Hall of Fame
- Chuck Connors (1942–1946) Actor. Played MLB and NBA
- Como Cotelle (1940)
- Moonlight Graham (1901) Field of Dreams character
- Joe Heving (1927)
- Kirby Higbe (1935–1936) 2× MLB All-Star
- Brooks Lawrence (1953) MLB All-Star; Cincinnati Reds Hall of Fame
- Pepper Martin (1954) 4× MLB All-Star; St. Louis Cardinals Hall of Fame
- Bill Nicholson (1937) 5× MLB All-Star
- Jack Russell (1942) MLB All-Star
- Jack Scott (1916)
- Jimmy Sheckard (1986)
- Eddie Stanky (1937–1939) 3× MLB All-Star
- Jesse Tannehill (1914)
- Jim Turner (1927) MLB All-Star
- Hal Wagner (1937) 2× MLB All-Star
- Rube Walker (1945)
