= Percy Dawson (baseball) =

American baseball figure

- Dawson in 1932
- Born: Henry Percivel Dawson; October 22, 1889; Halifax County, North Carolina, U.S.
- Died: January 17, 1982 (aged 92); Richmond, Virginia, U.S.
- Education: Wake Forest University
- Occupations: Baseball owner, executive, manager, and scout
- Known for: General manager of the Norfolk Tars

Henry Percivel "Percy" Dawson (Note: Dawson was commonly referred to as H. P. Dawson in contemporary newspaper articles.) (October 22, 1889 – January 17, 1982) was an American professional baseball figure. On the field, he had a brief minor-league career as an outfielder and manager. He later served as a scout, executive, and owner, mostly associated with the New York Yankees organization.

== Career ==
Dawson played college baseball for the Wake Forest Demon Deacons, then had a brief professional career in Minor League Baseball, playing as an outfielder for the Raleigh Red Birds of the Eastern Carolina League in 1908 and possibly 1909. (Note: Statistics for the 1908 Red Birds are lacking, as is detail of Dawson's minor-league career.)

Dawson later became a minor-league team owner, heading the Richmond Colts and Portsmouth Truckers, and a scout for the New York Yankees, signing, among others, pitcher Jim Coates. He also served as the head of the Yankees' farm system in the Virginia area. Dawson also managed Richmond in 1925, leading them to a championship of the Virginia League.

While owner of Portsmouth, Dawson was involved in a dispute with the Boston Red Sox over future Hall of Fame third baseman Pie Traynor. Red Sox owner Ed Barrow convinced Traynor to join Portsmouth, saying that if the third baseman performed well there, he would join the Red Sox, as the Boston team and Portsmouth had a gentleman's agreement, wherein Portsmouth served as something of a farm team for the Red Sox. However, the Truckers were still an independent team and, despite the informal agreement, were able to do anything they wished with Traynor, including selling him to another team. In September 1920, they sold him to the Pittsburgh Pirates, infuriating Burrow. "I hit the ceiling. I grabbed the phone and called Dawson and called him everything I could think of", Burrow said. Washington Senators owner Clark Griffith, too, was unhappy, claiming he thought his team would gain access to Traynor.

In July 1934, while business and general manager of the Norfolk Tars, Dawson was arrested, along with team manager Bill Skiff and pitcher Ray White, for striking a police officer and resisting arrest during a squabble over a disputed home run call. He was neither fined or jailed.

Dawson was working as a scout for the Yankees as late as December 1953. Born in North Carolina in October 1889, (Note: Dawson's draft registration card of April 1942 listed his place of birth as "Halifax" in North Carolina—it is unclear if this was a general reference to Halifax County or more specifically the town of Halifax, which is the county seat.) he died in January 1982 in Richmond, Virginia.
