= Ray Ryan (baseball) =

Ryan Ryan (died 1958) was an important minor league baseball figure. At that level, he played, managed, served as a team owner and league president, and worked in multiple team front offices. At the major league level, he scouted for the Cleveland Indians.

A catcher, Ryan played from 1906 to 1910, from 1912 to 1916 and in 1922. In 1910, he was a phantom ballplayer - on the Chicago White Sox active roster to begin the season, he did not appear in a game with the team. Overall, he played in 684 games and, according to available statistics, usually batted around the Mendoza Line. He often served as a player-manager.

As manager, he led the Chillicothe Infants (1912), Wheeling Stogies (1913), Norfolk Tars (1913), Rocky Mountain Carolinians (1915), Rocky Mountain Tar Heels (1916-1917), Richmond Colts (1921-1922), Jeannette Reds (1934), Allentown Brooks (1935), McKeesport Tubers (1936), Logan Indians (1942) and Palatka Azaleas (1948). He led the Carolinians to a Virginia League championship victory in 1915. In 1931, he was part-owner of the Richmond team - he also served as the team's business manager for a time.

In 1937, he was elected president of the Mountain State League. He also served as president of the Virginia State League and Appalachian League - he was president of all three leagues at the same time.

He died on August 9, 1958, in Miami, Florida.

Ryan was inducted posthumously into the Salem-Roanoke Baseball Hall of Fame (Salem, VA) in 2014. His granddaughter Nancy Foye-Cox accepted the award on his behalf.
