= Johnny Nee =

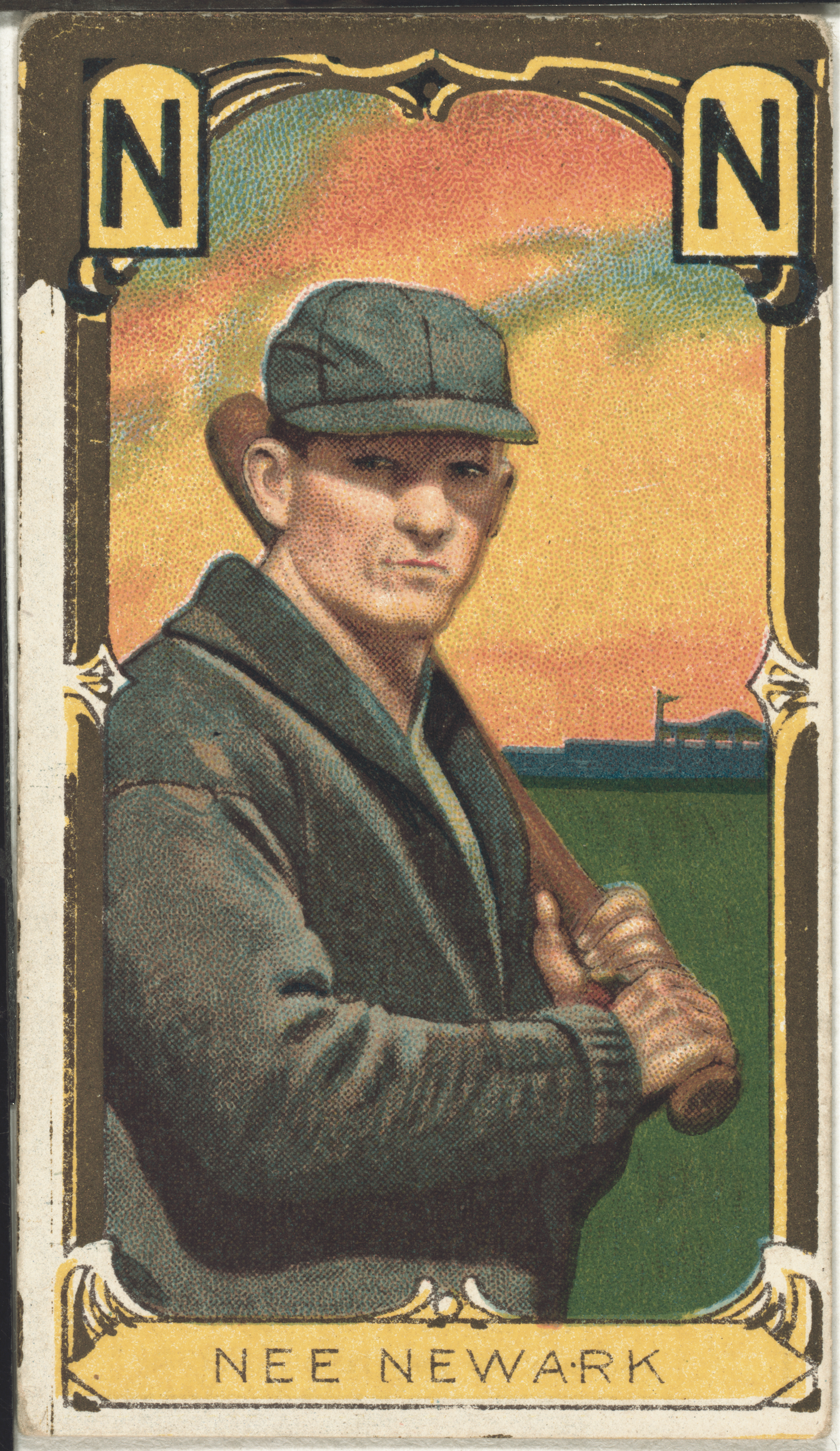
Baseball card showing Nee with the Newark team.

John Coleman Nee (January 15, 1890, in Thayer, Missouri – April 1957 in St. Petersburg, Florida) was a Major League Baseball (MLB) scout and a minor league player-manager.

Nee, a young minor league infielder of 22, was chosen to skipper the Terre Haute team in 1912 as a player-manager. He served as a player-manager at many of his minor league stops including his last post as the leader of the Virginia League Kinston Eagles (1925-1926). During that final managerial season, one of his young charges was future Hall of Fame member Rick Ferrell.

Starting in 1927, Nee began a long career as a major league scout for the New York Yankees and was credited with discovering many future major leaguers including Bill Dickey and Tommy Henrich. He left the Yankees for the Philadelphia Phillies in 1946. At the end of the 1949 season, Nee was named head of the Phillies farm system.

Nee and his wife of many years, Willa (née Harpe), lived in Pinellas County, Florida, where Willa died in 1952 and Johnny died in 1957.

== Sources ==
- Google News Archive
- Bloodgood, Clifford (1942), "Discoverer of Stars", Baseball Magazine: 455, 471
- Rennie, Rud (July 17, 1937), "Free Agent", Collier's, 100: 17
- Broeg, Bob (June 13, 1970), "Bill Dickey...A Yankee of Distinction", The Sporting News, 169: 18
