= Buck Thrasher =

American baseball player (1889-1938)

- Right fielder
- Born: August 6, 1889; Watkinsville, Georgia, U.S.
- Died: June 12, 1938 (aged 48); Cleveland, Tennessee, U.S.
- Batted: Left Threw: Right

MLB debut
- September 27, 1916, for the Philadelphia Athletics

Last MLB appearance
- May 16, 1917, for the Philadelphia Athletics

MLB statistics
- Batting average: .255
- Home runs: 0
- Runs batted in: 6
- Stats at Baseball Reference

Teams
- Philadelphia Athletics (1916–1917)

Frank Edward "Buck" Thrasher (August 6, 1889 – June 12, 1938) was an American right fielder in Major League Baseball. He played two seasons for the Philadelphia Athletics and also played nine seasons in the minor leagues. Thrasher was 5 feet, 11 inches tall and weighed 182 pounds.

== Baseball career ==
Thrasher started his professional baseball career in 1911. In his first season, he batted .351 for the Appalachian League's Cleveland Counts. The following year, he batted .340 and led the Appalachian League in hits (126) and total bases (163). Thrasher then moved to the Virginia League's Norfolk Tars in 1914. In 1915, he batted .348, hit a career-high 11 home runs, and led the circuit in batting average, hits (150), and total bases (216).

In 1916, Thrasher played 103 games for the Atlanta Crackers of the Southern Association. He batted .337 and then joined the major league Philadelphia Athletics. He made his MLB debut on September 27. In seven late-season games, Thrasher had a batting average of .310. He started 1917 with the Athletics, but after hitting .234 in 23 games, he returned to the Atlanta Crackers. That was his last full season as a player.

Thrasher had two short stints with the Virginia League's Wilson Bugs in the 1920s and was a manager in the Georgia–Alabama League in 1929. Over his nine-season minor league career, Thrasher played in 680 games, had 819 hits, and batted .330.

== Personal life ==
Thrasher was born in Watkinsville, Georgia, in 1889, to Isaac W. Thrasher and Louise Murry. He was married to the former Grace Phillips.

Thrasher died of coronary thrombosis in 1938 and was buried in Fort Hill Cemetery in Cleveland, Tennessee.
