= Ray White (baseball) =

American baseball player and manager

- Pitcher / Manager
- Born: November 26, 1910; Brooklyn, New York, U.S.
- Died: August 17, 1995 (aged 84); Norfolk, Virginia, U.S.
- Batted: Right Threw: Right

Raymond Petrie White (November 26, 1910 – August 17, 1995) was an American minor-league baseball pitcher and manager.

== Career ==
White played in Minor League Baseball from 1933 to 1940, mainly in the farm system of the New York Yankees. Over the course of his professional career, he pitched in at least 170 games (statistics are missing or incomplete for some seasons) with a win–loss record of 55–37 per available statistics.

In 1934, White had a 17–9 record while splitting the season between the Norfolk Tars and Binghamton Triplets. On June 29, 1934, a pitch thrown by White during an exhibition game struck Lou Gehrig of the Yankees in the head, knocking him out. According to news reports, Gehrig was out for five minutes and then left the game. Gehrig was in the lineup for the Yankees' next major-league game, which was played on July 1, giving him a full day to recover and continue his major-league streak of consecutive games played. In early July, White was arrested along with Tars team manager Bill Skiff and general manager Percy Dawson following a squabble over a disputed home run call; none of the Tars' personnel were fined or jailed.

In his first year of managing, White led the Bassett Furnituremakers to a league championship in 1937. He took the helm for the Norfolk Tars and led them to a playoff appearance in 1938; however, they lost in the first round. White managed future Hall of Famer Phil Rizzuto when he played for Norfolk that season. White led the Tars until 1940, when he was replaced partway through the season by Phil Page. White last managed for the Augusta Tigers in 1940, replacing the same Phil Page who took his job in Norfolk.
