= Charlie Babb (baseball) =

American baseball player (1873–1954)

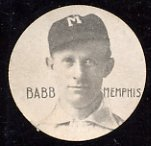
- Shortstop
- Born: February 20, 1873; Milwaukie, Oregon, U.S.
- Died: March 19, 1954 (aged 81); Portland, Oregon, U.S.
- Batted: Switch Threw: Right

MLB debut
- April 17, 1903, for the New York Giants

Last MLB appearance
- September 2, 1905, for the Brooklyn Superbas

MLB statistics
- Batting average: .243
- Home runs: 0
- Runs batted in: 116
- Stats at Baseball Reference

Teams
- New York Giants (1903); Brooklyn Superbas (1904–1905)

Charles Amos Babb (February 20, 1873 – March 19, 1954) was an American professional baseball player who played shortstop from 1903 to 1905. He managed in the minor leagues from 1906 to 1913.

== Professional career ==
=== Pre-MLB ===
In 1901 he played for the Fort Wayne Railroaders of the Western Association, where he batted .308 with 150 hits in 132 games.

In 1902 he split the season between the Indianapolis Indians of the American Association and the Memphis Egyptians of the Southern Association. He hit .298 with Indianapolis in 50 games and he hit .284 with Memphis in 66 games.

=== New York Giants ===
Babb played for the New York Giants in 1903. He hit .248 with 105 hits, 15 doubles, eight triples and 46 RBIs. This was his only season with the Giants.

=== Brooklyn Superbas ===
On December 12, 1903 he was traded by the New York Giants with Jack Cronin and $6,000 to the Brooklyn Superbas for Bill Dahlen.

In 1904 Babb hit .265 with 138 hits, 18 doubles, three triples and 53 RBIs. This would prove to be his best season statistically at the Major League level.

Babb hit .187 with 44 hits, eight doubles, two triples and 17 RBIs in 75 games in 1905. This would be his last season in the Majors.

=== Post-MLB ===
He became a player-manager after his career in the Major League Baseball. In 1906 he played and managed the Memphis Egyptians, a job he kept until 1910.

In 1911 he began the season with the Norfolk Tars of the Virginia League, playing and managing. He appeared in 126 games before he joined the St. Joseph Drummers of the Western League.

Babb joined the Altoona Rams/Reading Pretzels of the Tri-State League. In his return to playing-managing he appeared in 75 games and hit .283.

In his final season, 1913, Babb joined the Wichita Witches of the Western League. He appeared in only 41 games, batting a dismal .172.

Preceded by Lew Whistler	Memphis Egyptians/Memphis Turtles Manager; 1906–1910	Succeeded by Bill Bernhard
Preceded by Win Clark	Norfolk Tars Manager; 1911	Succeeded by Charlie Shaffer
Preceded by Henry Ramsey	Altoona Rams//Reading Pretzels Manager; 1912	Succeeded by Izzy Hoffman
Preceded by George Hughes	Wichita Witches Manager; 1913	Succeeded by Peaches Graham
