= Virginia–North Carolina League =

Minor league baseball league (1901 and 1905)

- Formerly: Virginia League
- Classification: Class C (1901); Class D (1905)
- Sport: Minor League Baseball
- First season: 1901
- Folded: August 19, 1905
- Director: E.H. Doran (1901); Jack Grimm (1905)
- President: W.H. Cunningham (1901)
- No. of teams: 9
- Country: United States of America
- Most titles: 1 Raleigh Senators (1901); Danville Tobacconists (1905)
- Related competitions: Virginia League (1900)

The Virginia–North Carolina League was a minor league baseball league that played in the 1901 and 1905 seasons, folding before the end of the season in both years. The Virginia–North Carolina League played as a six-team Class C level league in 1901 and as a four-team Class D league in the 1905 season. As the name indicates, the league consisted of teams based in Virginia and North Carolina. The Raleigh Senators (1901) and Danville Tobacconists (1905) captured the league championships.

== History ==
In 1901, the Virginia League evolved into the Class C level Virginia–North Carolina League. The Virginia League cities of New Port News Portsmouth and Richmond franchises continued play in the 1901 Virginia–North Carolina League, joining three new franchises.

The new Virginia–North Carolina League began forming in January 1901. The Virginia cities of Newport News, Norfolk, Portsmouth, and Richmond, Raleigh and Danville, Virginia, were front runners for consideration. Other North Carolina cities of Charlotte, Durham, Greensboro and Wilmington were all also recruited to form teams. Prior to the season, plans for both a ten–team league and an eight–team league were publicly announced. On February 18, 1901, at a meeting at the Monticello Hotel in Norfolk, Virginia, W.H. Cunningham was elected president and E.H. Doran selected as secretary. The league was formed with six teams, four from Virginia and two from North Carolina, with the schedule running from April 15 to September 21. General admission at all sites was set at 25 cents, with grandstands seats at 35 cents. The league employed a single umpire per game, at a salary of $7.00 per game, an amount deemed enough to attract the best umpires.

The Virginia–North Carolina League began play on April 16, 1901 with the six league members Newport News Shipbuilders, Norfolk Skippers, Portsmouth Browns, Raleigh Senators, Richmond Bluebirds and Wilmington Giants.

Games early in the season were plagued by rain and other bad weather, including a tornado that hit Newport News, Virginia on May 1, 1901. Attendance was diminished in as a result.

On May 2, 1901, the league took over the Portsmouth Browns franchise, which was suffering from poor attendance. The Newport News–Hampton Shipbuilders (32–26) moved to Charlotte, North Carolina and became the Charlotte Hornets on June 21, 1901, the same day the Portsmouth Browns (22–31) moved to Tarboro to become the Tarboro Tartars.

After the Norfolk Skippers and Richmond Grays franchises disbanded in July, the Virginia–North Carolina League continued play as a four–team league. The league then folded on August 17, 1901. After the league folded, an eleven–game 1901 "championship series" between the first–half champion Wilmington Giants and second–half champion Raleigh Senators was scheduled. After four games, the remainder of the series was cancelled due to numerous rain–outs. Raleigh won all four games played and claimed the league championship. With Charlotte and Greensboro as members, the league essentially evolved into the North Carolina League in 1902, before that league also disbanded on July 15, 1902.

The Virginia–North Carolina League formed again in 1905 as a four-team Class D level league, with help from Jack Grimm, who then became the manager of the Greensboro franchise. The 1905 league teams were the Charlotte Hornets, Danville Tobacconists, Greensboro Farmers and Salisbury-Spencer Twins/Winston-Salem Twins. On July 17, 1905, Salisbury-Spencer (24–28) moved to Winston-Salem and became the Winston-Salem Twins. The Virginia–North Carolina League disbanded before the conclusion of the season, stopping play on August 19, 1905 with Danville in first place (48–27), followed by Charlotte (40–42), Greensboro (36–47) and Winston-Salem (34–42).

== Virginia–North Carolina League teams ==
Team name	City represented	Ballpark	Year(s) active
Charlotte Hornets	Charlotte, North Carolina	Latta Park Baseball Field	1901, 1905
Danville Tobacconists	Danville, Virginia	League Park	1905
Greensboro Farmers	Greensboro, North Carolina	Cone Athletic Park (I)	1905
Newport News Shipbuilders	Newport News, Virginia & Hampton, Virginia	Lincoln Park	1901
Norfolk Skippers	Norfolk, Virginia	Unknown	1901
Portsmouth Browns	Portsmouth, Virginia	High Street Park	1901
Raleigh Senators	Raleigh, North Carolina	State Fairgrounds	1901
Richmond Bluebirds	Richmond, Virginia	Broad Street Park	1901
Salisbury-Spencer Twins	Salisbury, North Carolina & Spencer, North Carolina	Unknown	1905
Tarboro Tartars	Tarboro, North Carolina	Unknown	1901
Wilmington Giants	Wilmington, North Carolina	Hilton Park	1901
Winston-Salem Twins	Winston-Salem, North Carolina	Prince Albert Park	1905

== Standings & statistics ==
1901 Virginia–North Carolina League

Team standings	W	L	PCT	GB	Managers
Raleigh Senators	59	46	.562	–	George "King" Kelly
Wilmington Giants	58	46	.571	½	H.B. Peschau
Newport News Shipbuilders / Charlotte Hornets	50	55	.476	9	Ed Ashenbach
Portsmouth Browns / Tarboro Tartars	42	58	.420	24½	Win Clark
Norfolk Skippers	31	27	.534	NA	Ed Gilligan / William Spratt
Richmond Bluebirds	29	35	.435	NA	Barley Kain

Player statistics
1901 Player	Team	Stat	Tot	Player	Team	Stat	Tot
John Mullen	Norfolk	BA	.342	Jesse Dannehower	Norfolk	W	17
Stub Smith	Norfolk	Runs	61	Jesse Dannehower	Norfolk	SO	156
John Mullen	Norfolk	Hits	93	Jesse Dannehower	Norfolk	PCT	.708 17–7
Joe Staley	Raleigh	HR	10				
John Mullen	Norfolk	SB	35				

1905 Virginia–North Carolina League

1905 Team Standings	W	L	PCT	GB	Managers
Danville Tobacconists	66	31	.680	–	Ed Ransick
Charlotte Hornets	52	39	.571	11½	E.L. Keesler
Salisbury-Spencer Twins; Winston-Salem Twins	49	52	.485	14½	Con Strouthers / Earle Holt
Greensboro Farmers	43	51	.457	15	John J. Grim

Salisbury-Spencer (24–28) moved to Winston-Salem July 17. League folded August 19.
