= Arthur Hauger =

American baseball player (1893–1944)

Art Hauger
- Outfielder
- Born: November 18, 1893; Delhi, Ohio, U.S.
- Died: August 2, 1944 (aged 50); Redwood City, California, U.S.
- Batted: Left Threw: Right

MLB debut
- July 17, 1912, for the Cleveland Naps

Last MLB appearance
- August 28, 1912, for the Cleveland Naps

MLB statistics
- Batting average: .056
- Home runs: 0
- Runs batted in: 0
- Stats at Baseball Reference

Teams
- Cleveland Naps (1912)

John Arthur Hauger (November 18, 1893 – August 2, 1944) was an American Major League Baseball player and scout and minor league manager.

Hauger was an outfielder for the 1912 Cleveland Naps. He played in fifteen games and only managed one hit (a single) in eighteen at bats for a .056 career batting average.

He did have a long minor league career and saw some time as a minor league manager including a stint as the skipper of the Virginia League Kinston Eagles.

Later, Hauger worked for Western Pipe and Steel while working part-time as a scout for the Chicago White Sox until he died from a heart attack in 1944. He served in the Coast Guard Reserve during World War II.
