= Ralph Reeve =

Ralph Walker Reeve (July 25, 1884 – October 14, 1949) was an American baseball player and jurist. He played college baseball for the Dartmouth Big Green baseball team and minor league baseball for the Richmond Colts, Lynn Shoemakers, and Ottumwa Packers. After his baseball career, Reeve became an attorney and was chief justice of the Lynn District Court from 1921 until his death in 1949.

== Baseball ==
Reeve was born on July 25, 1884, in Somersworth, New Hampshire. He was one of four siblings. His brother, Guy C. Reeve, was Dade County Sheriff.

== Baseball ==
From 1902 to 1905, he played shortstop for Dartmouth. He played for amateur teams in Warren, Maine (1903), Corning, New York (1904), Coatesville, Pennsylvania (1904), Waterville, Maine (1905), and Lynn, Massachusetts (1905).

In 1906, Reeve joined the Richmond Colts of the Virginia League. That season, he appeared in 100 games and batted .205. The following year, he hit .202 in 137 games for the Colts and also served as player-manager for part of the season. He played for the Lynn Shoemakers of the New England League in 1908 and the Ottumwa Packers of the Central Association in 1909. Reeve played semi-pro professional in Maine, New Hampshire, and the Mississippi Valley League. In July 1914, he took over as manager of the Shoomakers following the resignation of Patsy Flaherty.

== Legal career ==
Reeve read law and was admitted to the bar in 1909. In 1921, he was appointed chief justice of the Lynn District Court by governor Channing H. Cox. In 1923, he arranged a conference between the Amalgamated Shoe Workers of America and the Lynn Shoe Manufacturers' Association which resulted in the Association recognizing the union and the union ending its strike and resuming working in the Association's 48 shops. In 1925, he upheld the Swampscott, Massachusetts board of selectmen's removal of police chief William L. Quinn for accepting bribes and allowing prohibition laws to be violated. In 1926, he ruled that the Salvation Army did not have a right to hold public meetings in the streets of Lynn, ruling that holding a religious service was not a valid defense for blocking traffic.

In 1928, Reeve held an inquest into the Preble Box Toe Company explosion. His report concluded that the Preble Box Toe Company did not realize the dangerous conditions in their factory and that "the unlawful acts and negligence of the [company]...contributed to the deaths of all these deceased persons". The report also criticized Lynn fire chief Edward E. Chase, who, according to Reeve "did not have the proper conception of his duties in reference to fire prevention and, consequently, did not perform those duties properly", but that his neglect was so indirect he could not be blamed for the deaths. Chase disputed Reeve's findings, stating that he had done nothing improper and was being made a scapegoat.

== Other work ==
Reeve was a member of the Progressive Party. In 1914, he ran for the chairmanship of the Lynn Progressive city committee, but was defeated by Lynn M. Ranger 16 votes to 14. He later joined the Republican Party and served as chairman of the Lynn Republican city committee.

Reeve was chairman of Lynn's draft board during World War I and World War II. He also served as chairman of the Lynn's public safety committee and Red Cross drive during the first World War.

== Personal life and death ==
Reeve married Virginia Pollard in 1905. They had no children.

Reeve died on October 14, 1949, at his home in Swampscott. Although he had been ill for several months, his death was unexpected.
