= Robert Pender =

American baseball player, manager, and umpire

Biographical details
- Born: Louisiana, U.S.
- Died: July 16, 1936

Coaching career (HC unless noted)
- 1912–1913: LSU

Head coaching record
- Overall: LSU: 15–17 (baseball)

Robert Edmund Pender (1867 – July 16, 1936) held multiple roles in professional baseball. He played, managed and umpired at the minor league level for many years.

His playing career began in 1886 and lasted through 1907. Records indicate that Pender, who played multiple positions including third base, first base and even pitcher, did not play in 1891 and 1902. His statistical record is incomplete, however it is known that in 1896, with the Richmond Bluebirds of the Virginia League, he hit .312 with 56 stolen bases and in 1901, with the Selma Christians of the Southern Association, he hit .303 in 104 games. He played in the Interstate League in 1898 and 1899 and was called "the best third baseman [the Interstate League] has ever had," by the Youngstown Vindicator.

As a manager, he led the Petersburg Farmers (1895), Selma Christians (1901), Baton Rouge Cajuns (1902), Baton Rouge Red Sticks (1903–1904), Charleston Sea Gulls (1906) and Norfolk Tars (1907–1909). He led the Red Sticks to a league championship in 1903 and the Tars to a league championship in 1907.

He then became an umpire in the Virginia League and New York State League. In April 1909, he was chased by an angry mob after it was claimed he was intentionally trying to throw a game. He took refuge in the Roanoke jail.

== College coaching ==
He was the head baseball coach at Louisiana State University in 1912 and 1913. He compiled a record of 15–17 in his two seasons as head coach.

== Personal life ==
He was born in Louisiana and died on July 16, 1936.
