= Buck Pressly =

American baseball player and physician (1886–1954)

- First baseman / Manager
- Born: William Lowry Pressly; December 2, 1886; Due West, South Carolina, US
- Died: September 27, 1954 (aged 67); Due West, South Carolina, US
- Batted: Unknown Threw: Unknown
- Stats at Baseball Reference

William Lowry "Buck" Pressly (Note: His surname has also been spelled Pressley.) (Note: William Lowry Pressly should not be confused with another "W. L. Pressly", William Laurens Pressly (1837–1906), who served as president of Erskine Theological Seminary and was the son of Ebenezer Erskine Pressly.) (December 2, 1886 – September 27, 1954) was an American professional baseball first baseman and manager, and also a physician.

== Biography ==
Pressly was born in Due West, South Carolina, in 1886 and died there in 1954. His father, John Lowry Pressly (1857–1933), was a professor of Greek and Latin at Erskine College. Buck Pressly attended Erskine College and Emory College. He is an inductee of the Erskine College Hall of Fame.

=== Baseball career ===
Pressly played in minor league baseball from 1908 to 1914, in 1916 and for one game in 1922. Primarily a first baseman, he spent most of his playing career with the Roanoke Tigers and also suited up for the Norfolk Tars and Greenville Spinners. In 1910, he had a 1.000 fielding percentage for the Tigers, and in his lone 1922 game, he collected one hit in one at bat, for a 1.000 batting average.

Pressly also served as manager of several teams. He initially managed the Tigers in 1912 and 1913 and then the Tars for a couple years, winning pennants in 1912 and 1914. Following 1914, he left baseball to become a doctor, but later returned to the sport. He assumed the role of Greenville Spinners manager in late 1921. Pressly later served as president of the Carolina League. He also was the head coach of the Erskine College baseball team.

=== Medical career ===
Pressly became a well-known family doctor. He was named the 1948 family doctor of the year by earning the General Practitioner Award from the American Medical Association. He also served as President of the South Carolina Medical Association.
