= Preble Box Toe Company explosion =

1928 industrial disaster in Lynn, Massachusetts

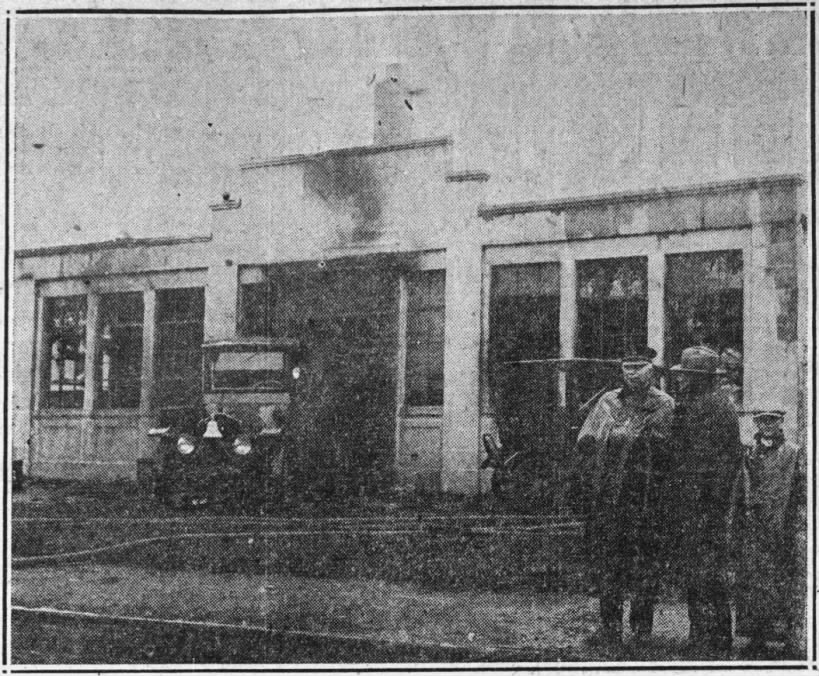
- The front of the accident site, as published in The Boston Globe
- Date: November 8, 1928
- Time: 7:40 a.m.
- Location: 93 Brookline Street Lynn, Massachusetts, U.S.; 42°28′15″N 70°55′49″W
- Cause: Ignition of chemical vapors
- Deaths: 20
- Injuries: 50+

The Preble Box Toe Company explosion occurred on November 8, 1928, at the company's factory in Lynn, Massachusetts. Eleven people died in the blast and resulting fires and another nine later died from their injuries, making it the deadliest explosion to occur in Greater Boston.

== Background ==
A profile of the company published in April 1928 noted that it had originally been established about 30 years prior as the Preble-Thomas Company and had reorganized circa 1924 as the Preble Box Toe (Note: A box toe is defined by Merriam-Webster as "a toe of a shoe made with a rigid or a flexible reinforcement".) Company. Based in Lynn, Massachusetts, and originally located in basement space on Broad Street, the company purchased a factory on Brookline Street following its reorganization, then acquired additional space in another factory on Eastern Avenue. The company, which employed about 50 people, was planning to build a new factory at Broad and Commercial Streets.

The factory on Brookline Street had been built in 1921, before the passage of zoning laws. As a result, it was surrounded by a thickly-settled residential neighborhood. It was built from concrete and reinforced steel with a cement floor, and was thought to be fireproof.

== Explosion ==
Around 7:40 a.m. on November 8, 1928, a series of explosions occurred at the Brookline Street factory. The first explosion saw flames shoot out of the roof and from all four sides of the buildings. The cement bricks that made up the building were sent over Groveland Street and five houses behind the factory caught fire and were badly damaged. Two workmen were blasted through a 1-foot-thick (30 cm) cement wall and another was blown through a door and landed in the street 20 feet (6.1 m) away. A total of 11 people died in the blast and nine more died from injuries they suffered in the blast. Fifty people who lived near the factory or were passing through the area were injured by broken glass.

The first fire alarm was sounded by a twelve-year-old boy who had to be boosted up by a friend to reach the fire alarm box. Apparatuses from Swampscott, Marblehead and Saugus assisted the Lynn Fire Department at the scene while crews from Peabody and Revere filled the empty Lynn stations. John Kelley, owner of a laundry across the street from the factory, allowed his store to be used as a Red Cross station.

=== Blaney family ===
The home closest to the factory, at 44 Groveland Street, belonged to the Blaney family and caught fire soon after the explosion. Lillian Blaney and four of her children died as the walls of their home collapsed. The Blaneys' eldest daughter, Vivan, died in the hospital later that day. Two of the Blaney children escaped from the house but were badly burned, while two others were not at home when the disaster occurred.

Lillian Blaney and her five children were buried in Waterside Cemetery in Marblehead, Massachusetts, on November 11. Over 500 people showed up to the funeral services. President Calvin Coolidge sent a letter of condolence to the family's eldest surviving son, Harry Blaney Jr. Lynn Mayor Ralph S. Bauer started a fund to aid the surviving Blaney children. Family patriarch Harry Blaney died from his injuries on November 21.

== Cause ==
In the aftermath of the disaster, the state fire marshal reported that the blast had been caused by vapors rising from liquids used in the factory that caught fire and then exploded. Lynn fire chief Edward E. Chase found an ashtray containing cigarette butts and ash in the ruins of the factory, even though smoking was prohibited on the premises. State chemist Perley L. Charter reported that pyroxylin, acetic ether, guncotton, naphtha, and alcohol were found in the factory. Pyroxylin, a liquid solution made by treating dry guncotton with acetic ether, was used to make imitation leather for shoes. According to Charter, even the finished product had been known to explode and a factory using such volatile chemicals should have not been permitted within 500 feet (150 m) of a residence; however, the nearest residence to the Preble factory was only 12 feet (3.7 m) away. A grand jury investigation found that four to five tons of celluloid and inflammable liquid were kept on the property.

== Legal proceedings ==
An inquest was held before Judge Ralph Reeve. Reeve's report concluded that the Preble Box Toe Company did not realize the dangerous conditions in their factory and that "the unlawful acts and negligence of the [company]...contributed to the deaths of all these deceased persons". The report also criticized Chief Chase, who, according to Reeve "did not have the proper conception of his duties in reference to fire prevention and, consequently, did not perform those duties properly", but that his neglect was so indirect he could not be blamed for the deaths. Chase disputed Reeve's findings, stating that he had done nothing improper and was being made a scapegoat.

A grand jury indicted the Preble Box Toe Company for using a lot of land without a license and for storing inflammable fluid without a license. In June 1929, the company was fined a total of $100 ($1,875 in 2025) for those charges, the maximum allowed.

The grand jury also recommended that modifications be made to the Lynn Fire Department and criticized its captain in charge of fire inspection, John H. Day, who had been to the factory three times but did not realize the dangers that the chemicals being used there posed.

The Preble Box Toe Company's insurer, Travelers Insurance Company, refused to pay double indemnity to the dependents of those killed or injured in the explosion. On September 25, 1929, the Chairman of the State Industrial Accident Board denied the double indemnity claims on the grounds that there was not enough evidence to prove that the Preble Box Toe Company "was guilty of serious and willful misconduct".

== See also ==
- List of disasters in Massachusetts by death toll
