= Jesse Tannehill =

American baseball player (1874–1956)

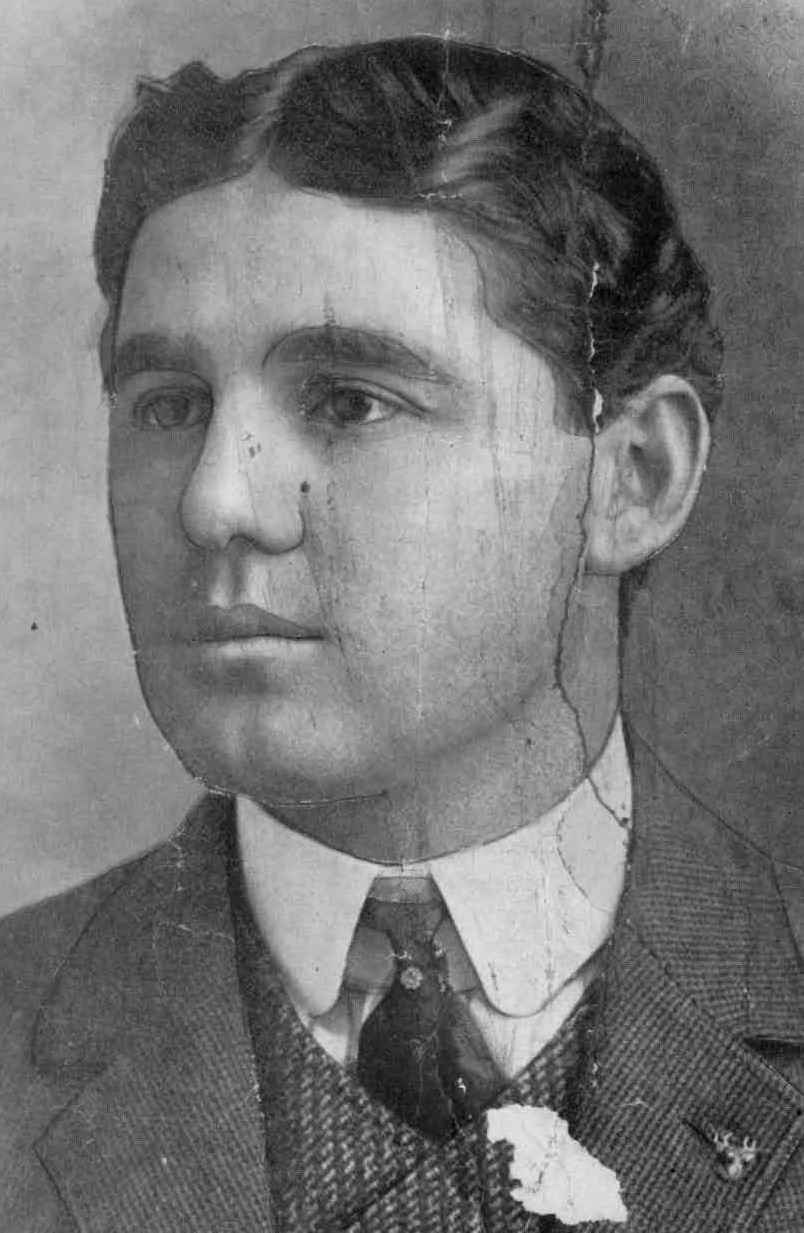
- Pitcher
- Born: July 14, 1874; Dayton, Kentucky, U.S.
- Died: September 22, 1956 (aged 82); Dayton, Kentucky, U.S.
- Batted: Both Threw: Left

MLB debut
- June 17, 1894, for the Cincinnati Reds

Last MLB appearance
- April 12, 1911, for the Cincinnati Reds

MLB statistics
- Win–loss record: 197–117
- Earned run average: 2.79
- Strikeouts: 940
- Stats at Baseball Reference

Teams
- Cincinnati Reds (1894); Pittsburgh Pirates (1897–1902); New York Highlanders (1903); Boston Americans / Red Sox (1904–1908); Washington Senators (1908–1909); Cincinnati Reds (1911)

Career highlights and awards
- NL ERA leader (1901); Pitched a no-hitter on August 17, 1904

Jesse Niles Tannehill (July 14, 1874 – September 22, 1956) was an American dead-ball era left-handed pitcher for the Cincinnati Reds, Pittsburgh Pirates, New York Highlanders, Boston Red Sox, and the Washington Senators. Tannehill was among the best pitchers of his era and was one of the best-hitting pitchers of all time, resulting in him being used in the outfield 87 times in his career.

== Biography and playing career ==
Tannehill was born in Dayton, Kentucky. He broke into the National League at the age of 19 with the Cincinnati Reds; however, he struggled in 29 innings and did not reappear in the major leagues until three years later. After a partial season with the Pittsburgh Pirates in 1897, Tannehill set a career high in both innings pitched (326 2/3) and wins (25) in 1898. Tannehill had several good years with the Pirates until his career year in 1901, when he led the National League in ERA at 2.18. Tannehill posted an even better ERA in 1902 at 1.95, but as the league ERA had dropped even more precipitously, he did not lead the National League in ERA.

After six years with the Pirates of the National League, Tannehill got involved in a salary dispute with Pirates owner Barney Dreyfuss. As a result, Tannehill jumped to the startup American League franchise the New York Highlanders. After the season, he was traded by the Highlanders to the Boston Americans for Tom L. Hughes. Tannehill still had some good years left, however; he was an important part of the Boston Americans championship team of 1904. Tannehill pitched a no-hitter against the Chicago White Sox on August 17, 1904 (his brother Lee went 0-for-3 for Chicago) and continued to be an above average pitcher until 1907. After this however, Tannehill went into precipitous decline, as he was traded to the Washington Senators for Case Patten. Tannehill retired from baseball in 1911, with a career ERA of 2.79 and 197 career wins.

Tannehill was also noted for his strong bat in his 15-year major league career, posting a career .255 batting average (361-for-1414) with 190 runs, 55 doubles, 23 triples, 5 home runs, 142 RBI and 105 bases on balls.

== After baseball ==
After retiring as a player, Tannehill managed the Portsmouth Truckers of the Virginia League in 1914. He then served as an umpire in the Ohio State League, International League, and Western League, before returning to the majors as a coach for the Philadelphia Phillies in 1920 under manager Gavvy Cravath, a stint that lasted one season. In 1923 he managed the Topeka Kaws in the Southwestern League.

In his last years, Tannehill worked in a Cincinnati machine shop and was a frequent visitor to Crosley Field, the home of the Cincinnati Reds from 1912 to 1970. He suffered a stroke on September 16, 1956 at his home in Dayton, Kentucky and died six days later at the age of 82 at Speers Hospital.

== See also ==
- List of Major League Baseball annual ERA leaders
- List of Major League Baseball career hit batsmen leaders
- List of Major League Baseball no-hitters

Preceded by Cy Young	No-hitter pitcher August 17, 1904	Succeeded by Christy Mathewson
