= Thomas Kain =

American figure in minor league baseball and college football

- Born: July 7, 1907; Nashville, Tennessee, US
- Died: June 24, 1971 (aged 63); Nashville, Tennessee, US
- Other name: Shaky
- Education: University of Georgia
- Occupations: Professional baseball pitcher (1927, 1929–37, 1939, 1941–43); Professional baseball manager (1939–1943, 1946); Professional baseball scout (1947–1951, 1956–1968); College football referee (1935–1963)
- Spouse: Mary Ruth Woolard
- Children: 2
- Awards: Tennessee Sports Hall of Fame (1986)

Thomas Gerald "Shaky" Kain (July 7, 1907 – June 24, 1971) was a professional baseball pitcher for 14 seasons in Minor League Baseball, a three-time championship-winning manager at that level for six seasons, a scout for Major League Baseball teams, and a college football referee.

== Early life ==
Kain was born in 1907 in Nashville, Tennessee, and attended Hume-Fogg High School. He then attended the University of Georgia where he played college football, as a fullback and halfback, and college baseball.

== Sports career ==
Kain was a pitcher in the minor leagues in 1927, 1929–1937, 1939, and 1941–1943, spending most of his career in the New York Yankees farm system. He had a win–loss record of 87–70 in 217 games pitched—although minor league baseball records for the era are incomplete—winning as many as 16 games in a season four times.

He then was a manager in the minor leagues for the Butler Yankees (1939-1941), Amsterdam Rugmakers (1942) and Norfolk Tars (1943, 1946). He led his teams to the playoffs each year he managed.

Kain was a scout for the Yankees from 1947 to 1948, the Pittsburgh Pirates from 1949 to 1951, the Philadelphia Phillies from 1956 to 1959, and the Chicago Cubs from 1960 to 1968.

During the baseball offseason, Kain was a college football referee in the Southeastern Conference (SEC), a job he held for 28 years (1935–1963). He was considered the top referee at the time, being selected to officiate 14 consecutive Senior Bowls.

== Personal life ==
Kain was married in 1932; he and his wife had two sons. During World War II, he spent two years working for Vultee Aircraft in Nashville. Kain was elected to the Tennessee Sports Hall of Fame in 1986, and to the Middle Tennessee Football Officials Association (MTFOA) Hall of Fame in 2017. He died in Nashville in 1971, and is buried in Woodlawn Memorial Park there.
