= Zinn Beck =

American baseball player (1885–1981)

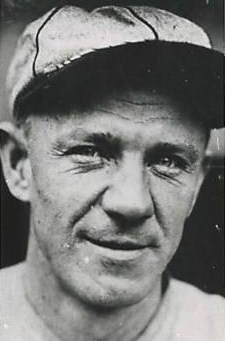
- Third baseman
- Born: September 30, 1885; Steubenville, Ohio, U.S.
- Died: March 19, 1981 (aged 95); West Palm Beach, Florida, U.S.
- Batted: Right Threw: Right

MLB debut
- September 13, 1913, for the St. Louis Cardinals

Last MLB appearance
- July 22, 1918, for the New York Yankees

MLB statistics
- Batting average: .226
- Home runs: 3
- Runs batted in: 73
- Stats at Baseball Reference

Teams
- St. Louis Cardinals (1913–1916); New York Yankees (1918)

Zinn Bertram Beck (September 30, 1885 – March 19, 1981) was an American professional baseball player and manager. A third baseman, shortstop and first baseman, Beck played in Major League Baseball for the St. Louis Cardinals and New York Yankees. He became a minor league manager. Beck became a scout for the Washington Senators in 1931 and continued until his death as a scout after they moved to Minnesota and became the Minnesota Twins.

== Playing career ==
Beck played for the St. Louis Cardinals from 1913 to 1916, and the New York Yankees in 1918. In 290 career MLB games, he had a .226 batting average with 204 hits in 902 at-bats. He batted and threw right-handed. In 1919, Beck played for the Vernon Tigers, who won the Pacific Coast League championship.

== Minor League managerial career ==
From 1920 to 1922 Beck managed the Columbia Comers in Columbia, South Carolina, winning the South Atlantic League pennant the first two years. From 1923 to 1925 Beck managed the Greenville Spinners in Greenville, South Carolina also in the South Atlantic League. In 1927 he managed the Portsmouth Truckers in Portsmouth, Virginia, winning the Virginia League pennant, and in 1928 managed the Norfolk Tars in Norfolk, Virginia until the Virginia League disbanded in June. He managed the Selma Cloverleafs in Selma, Alabama for the last part of the 1928 season, returning for full seasons in 1929 and 1930, winning the Southeastern League pennant that year. In 1934 he managed the Washington Senators farm team the Chattanooga Lookouts before being replaced by Mule Shirley.

== Later life ==
Beck died on March 19, 1981 in Lake Worth, Florida at age 95 after having lived in Sanford. He had been serving as a scount for the Minnesota Twins for 51 years, starting during the franchise's time as the Washington Senators in 1931. He signed players such as Early Wynn, Goose Goslin and Jimmy Bloodworth to their first playing contracts. He had also scouted John Castino, who played for the Twins from 1979–1984. He would be buried at Evergreen Cemetery in Sanford on March 27.

Zinn Beck Field at Sanford Memorial Stadium in Sanford, Florida is named in his honor. In 1978, he was presented with the King of Baseball award given by Minor League Baseball.
