= Cliff Markle =

American baseball player (1894–1974)

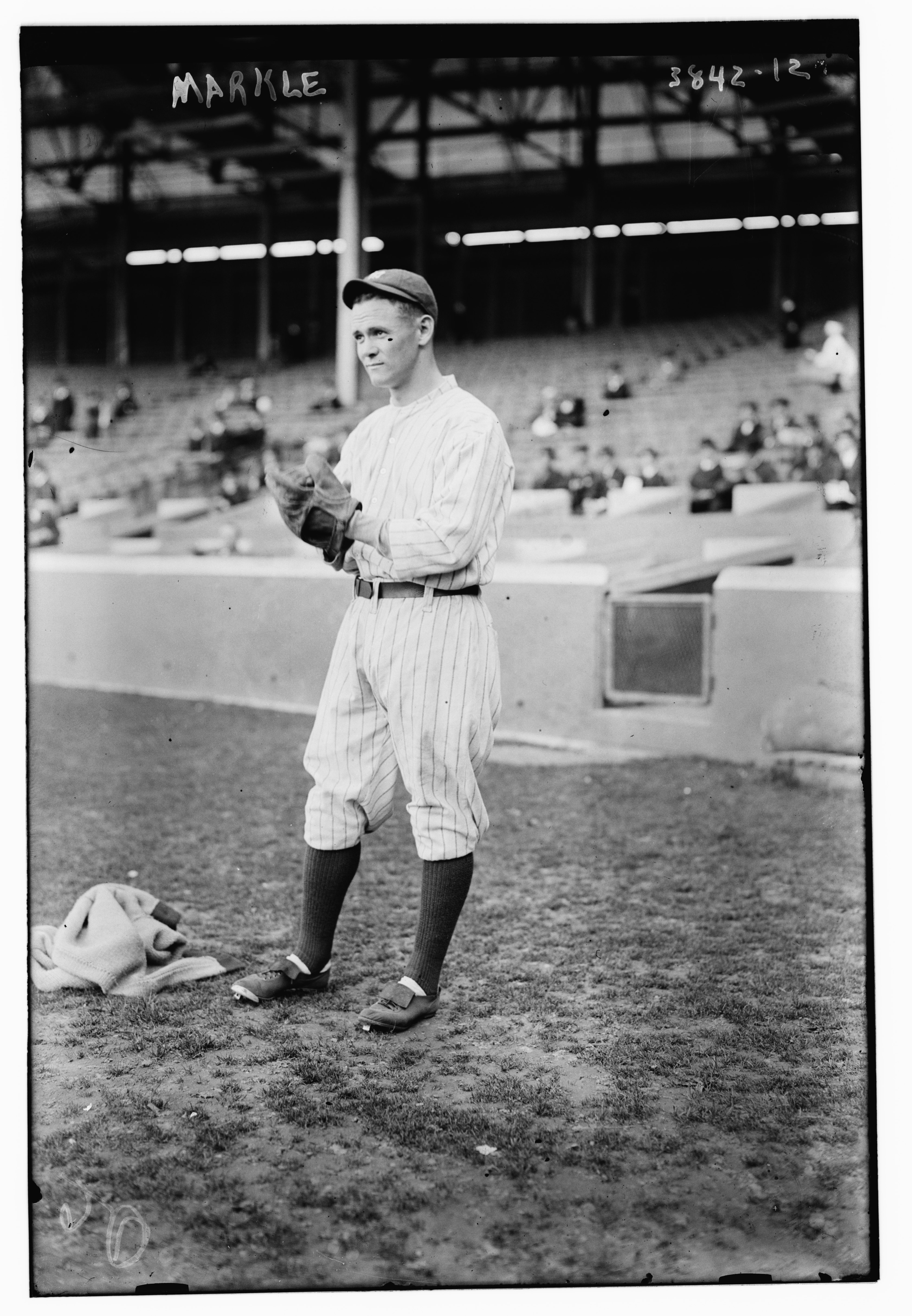
- Pitcher
- Born: May 3, 1894; Dravosburg, Pennsylvania, U.S.
- Died: May 24, 1974 (aged 80); Temple City, California, U.S.
- Batted: Right Threw: Right

MLB debut
- September 18, 1915, for the New York Yankees

Last MLB appearance
- July 14, 1924, for the New York Yankees

MLB statistics
- Win–loss record: 12–17
- Earned run average: 4.10
- Strikeouts: 90
- Stats at Baseball Reference

Teams
- New York Yankees (1915–1916); Cincinnati Reds (1921–1922); New York Yankees (1924)

Clifford Monroe Markle (May 3, 1894 – May 24, 1974) was an American Major League Baseball pitcher who played with the New York Yankees and the Cincinnati Reds. He batted and threw right-handed.

He was born in Dravosburg, Pennsylvania, and died in Temple City, California.
