= Jim Viox =

American baseball player (1890–1969)

- Second baseman
- Born: December 30, 1890; Lockland, Ohio, U.S.
- Died: January 6, 1969 (aged 78); Erlanger, Kentucky, U.S.
- Batted: Right Threw: Right

MLB debut
- May 9, 1912, for the Pittsburgh Pirates

Last MLB appearance
- July 22, 1916, for the Pittsburgh Pirates

MLB statistics
- Batting average: .273
- Runs batted in: 191
- Hits: 465
- Stats at Baseball Reference

Teams
- Pittsburgh Pirates (1912–1916)

James Henry Viox (Note: Often referred to as having the middle name of "Harry", personal biographical data consistently details the name to be Henry.)) (December 30, 1890 – January 6, 1969) was an American professional baseball player who played for five seasons in the National League from 1912 to 1916, all of them with the Pittsburgh Pirates. He played second base for much of his career, and played in the middle infield with Honus Wagner during the latter's final seasons.

== Professional career ==
Viox made his major league debut on May 9, 1912. In 33 games that season, he hit .186 while spending time in the field at third base and shortstop. The following season, in 1913, Viox became the team's regular second baseman, replacing Alex McCarthy at that position. In his first full season, he hit .317, setting a rookie record for batting average by a second baseman that was not matched until 2007 when Dustin Pedroia also hit .317. His on-base percentage of .399 remains a record for a rookie second baseman as of the 2020 season. During the season, Viox finished in the top 10 in batting average, on-base percentage, slugging percentage, runs scored, doubles, and sacrifice hits.

His batting average fell over the next two seasons, to .265 in 1914 and .256 in 1915. He showed a good batting eye during those seasons, however, as in both years he was ranked among the top 10 in walks. In his final season in the major leagues, he played in only 43 games and batted .250; his time with the Pirates ended when the club made major changes to its roster.

== Post career ==
After his playing days were over, he managed for a time in the minor leagues. During this time, he won two Virginia League championships in 1920 and 1921 while managing Portsmouth.

== Personal life ==
Viox was wedded to Nell Buckner Lovely during the 1914 season and were married for 54 years until his death from lung cancer on January 6, 1969, in Erlanger, Kentucky.
