= Norfolk Tars =

Professional minor-league baseball team in Norfolk, Virginia (1906–1955)

The Norfolk Tars were a minor league baseball team that existed on and off from 1906 to 1955. Based in Norfolk, Virginia, they played in the Virginia League from 1906 to 1918 and from 1921 to 1928, in the Eastern League from 1931 to 1932 and in the Piedmont League from 1934 to 1955; during this latter period they were also affiliated with the New York Yankees. Their home field was Bain Field until 1940 and Myers Field from 1940 to 1955. The club folded after playing its final game on July 13, 1955, an 11–3 victory over the Sunbury Redlegs before a crowd of 851. The 1952 Tars were recognized as one of the 100 greatest minor league teams of all time.

== Year-by-year record ==
Year	Record	Finish	Manager	Playoffs
1906	62-44	2nd	Win Clark	none
1907	67-48	1st	Robert Pender	none League Champs
1908	52-78	6th	Robert Pender	none
1909	72-49	2nd	Robert Pender / Win Clark	none
1910	58-56	3rd	Win Clark	none
1911	67-54	2nd	Charles Babb	none
1912	67-65	5th	Charles Shaffer	none
1913	51-83	6th	Charles Shaffer / George Kircher / Ray Ryan	none
1914	93-48	1st	William "Buck" Pressley	none League Champs
1915	66-56	3rd	M.D. "Red" McMahon	none
1916	38-77	5th	M.D. "Nelly" McMahon / William "Buck" Pressley	none
1917	7-9	4th	Art Devlin	League disbanded May 15
1918	13-33	4th	Art Devlin	League ceased operations in June
1921	74-64	5th	Jack Warhop	Lost League Finals
1922	58-57	3rd	Win Clark	none
1923	62-60	4th	Win Clark	none
1924	69-66	4th	Win Clark	none
1925	72-60	3rd	Dave Robertson	none
1926	79-73	3rd	Dave Robertson	none
1927	58-72	5th	Dave Robertson	none
1928	26-13	1st	Zinn Beck	League disbanded June 3
1931	62-73	6th	Win Clark	none
1932	31-45	7th	Win Clark / Harry Blake	League disbanded July 17
1934	89-49	1st	Bill Skiff	League Champs
1935	67-70	4th	Bill Skiff	
1936	93-50	1st	Johnny Neun	League Champs
1937	83-53	2nd	Johnny Neun	League Champs
1938	84-52	1st	Ray White	Lost in 1st round
1939	66-71	6th	Ray White	
1940	66-71	6th	Ray White / Phil Page	
1941	71-68	4th	Eddie Sawyer	Lost in 1st round
1942	57-79	7th	Buzz Boyle	
1943	66-63	3rd	Tom "Shaky" Kain	League Champs
1944	72-68	3rd	Garland Braxton	Lost in 1st round
1945	83-57	1st	Garland Braxton	Lost in 1st round
1946	71-69	4th	Thomas Kain	Lost in 1st round
1947	69-70	2nd	Buddy Hassett	Lost League Finals
1948	65-75	5th	Earl Bolyard	
1949	68-72	5th	Earl Bolyard / Frank Novosel	
1950	58-82	5th	Frank Novosel	
1951	81-58	1st	Mayo Smith	League Champs
1952	96-36	1st	Mayo Smith	Lost in 1st round
1953	81-51	1st	Mickey Owen	League Champs
1954	87-53	1st	Skeeter Scalzi	Lost in 1st round
1955	37-34	--	Al Evans / Alton Brown / Bill Herring	Team disbanded July 14

== See also ==
- Percy Dawson (1889–1982), longtime general manager of the team
