= Harry Mathews (baseball) =

American baseball coach

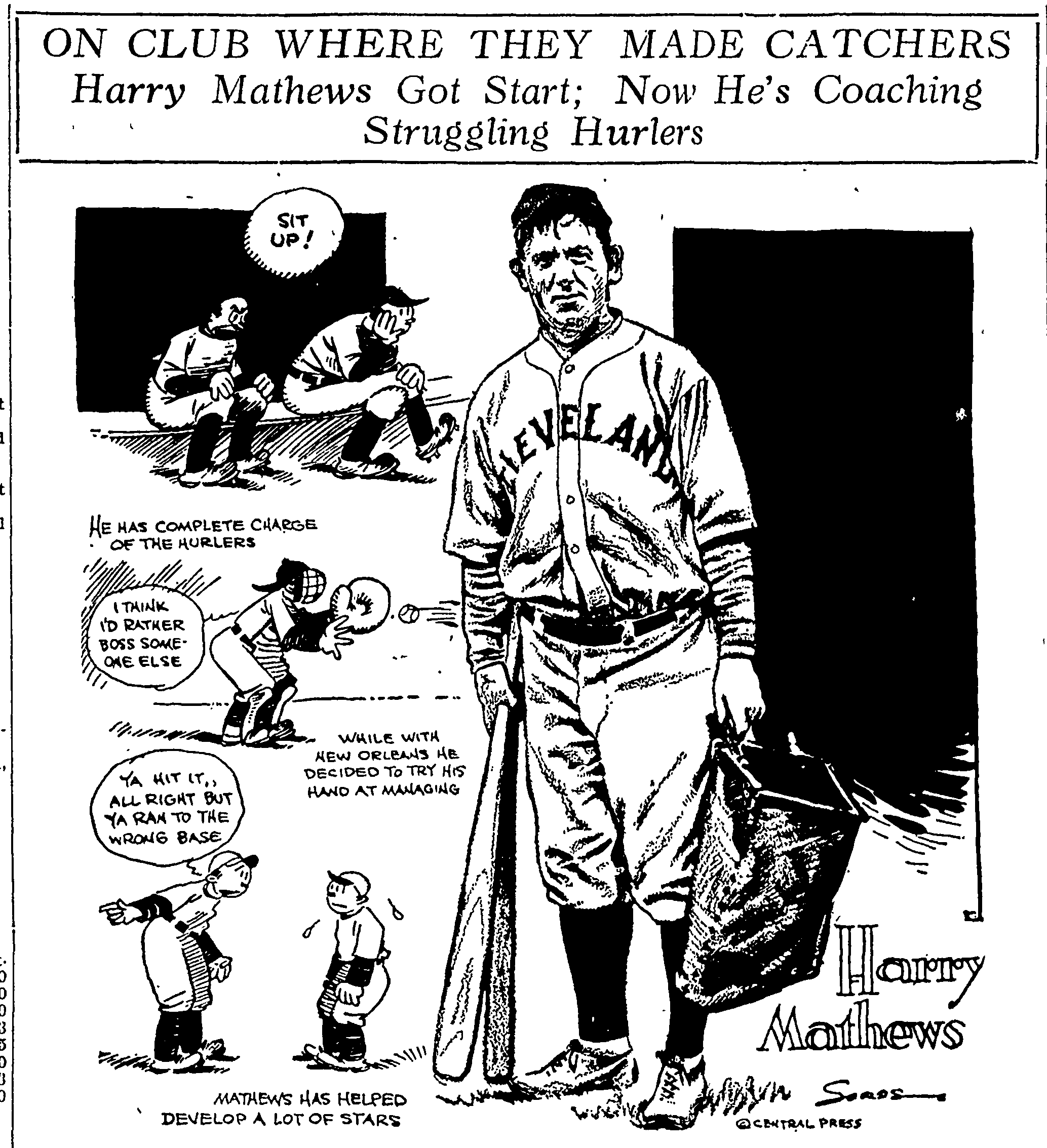

Personal information
- Born: 23 July 1867 Newport, KY
- Died: Unknown

Harry Matthews (born July 23, 1876, in Newport, Kentucky) was a baseball coach.

Matthews coached for the Cleveland Indians in 1926 and 1927, and for the New York Yankees in 1929.
