= Guy Lacy =

American baseball player (1897–1953)

- Second baseman
- Born: June 12, 1897; Cleveland, Tennessee, U.S.
- Died: November 19, 1953 (aged 56); Cleveland, Tennessee, U.S.
- Batted: Right Threw: Right

MLB debut
- May 7, 1926, for the Cleveland Indians

Last MLB appearance
- August 17, 1926, for the Cleveland Indians

MLB statistics
- Batting average: .167
- Home runs: 1
- Runs batted in: 2
- Stats at Baseball Reference

Teams
- Cleveland Indians (1926)

Osceola Guy Lacy (June 12, 1897 – November 19, 1953) was an American second baseman in Major League Baseball. He played for the Cleveland Indians in 1926.

He was a manager in the minor leagues from 1926 to 1941, winning league championships in 1931, 1934 and 1940.
