= Carl Ray (baseball) =

American baseball player (1889–1970)

- Pitcher
- Born: January 31, 1889; Danbury, North Carolina, U.S.
- Died: April 2, 1970 (aged 81); Lexington, North Carolina, U.S.
- Batted: Left Threw: Left

MLB debut
- September 25, 1915, for the Philadelphia Athletics

Last MLB appearance
- May 9, 1916, for the Philadelphia Athletics

MLB statistics
- Win–loss record: 0-2
- Earned run average: 4.86
- Strikeouts: 11
- Stats at Baseball Reference

Teams
- Philadelphia Athletics (1915–1916)

Carl Grady Ray (January 31, 1889 – April 2, 1970) was an American Major League Baseball pitcher who played in 1915 and 1916 with the Philadelphia Athletics.
