= Roanoke Red Sox =

- 1943–1950; (1894–1896, 1906–1914, 1939–1953); Roanoke, Virginia

Minor league affiliations
- Class: Class B (1895–1896); Class C (1906–1914); Class D (1939–1940); Class C (1941–1942); Class B (1943–1953)
- League: Virginia League (1894–1896, 1906–1914, 1939–1942); Piedmont League (1943–1953)

Major league affiliations
- Team: Cleveland Indians (1940); Boston Red Sox (1943-1953)

Minor league titles
- League titles (5): 1909; 1912; 1941; 1947; 1950
- Conference titles (1): 1946

Team data
- Name: Roanoke Magicians (1894–1896); Roanoke Tigers (1906–1914); Salem–Roanoke Friends (1939–1942); Roanoke Red Sox (1943–1950); Roanoke Ro–Sox (1951–1953)
- Ballpark: Roanoke Ballpark (1894–1896, 1906); Salem Municipal Stadium (1939–1942); Maher Field (1907–1914, 1939–1953)

The Roanoke Red Sox was a primary name of the minor league baseball teams based in Roanoke, Virginia. Between 1894 and 1953, Roanoke teams played as members of the Virginia League (1894–1896, 1906–1914, 1939–1942) and Piedmont League (1943–1953), winning five league championships and one pennant. Roanoke teams were a minor league affiliate of the Cleveland Indians in 1940 and Boston Red Sox from 1943 to 1953. Baseball Hall of Fame members Jack Chesbro (1896) and Heinie Manush (1943) played for Roanoke.

The Roanoke Red Sox preceded today's Class A level Salem Red Sox of the Carolina League.

== History ==
Baseball began in Roanoke with the Roanoke Magicians (1894–1896), who were members of the Virginia League and had three consecutive losing seasons. The Virginia League folded after the 1896 season. Baseball Hall of Fame inductee Jack Chesbro was a pitcher for Roanoke in 1896 in his second professional season.

The Roanoke Tigers (1906–1914) played in the reformed Virginia League. The Tigers captured Virginia League Championships in 1909 and 1912.

In 1939, the Salem–Roanoke Friends (1939–1942) began play as members of the Virginia League. The team was named for Roanoke and neighboring Salem, Virginia. The Friends were affiliates of the Cleveland Indians (1940) and captured the 1941 Virginia League Championship. The Virginia League folded after the 1942 season.

After the Virginia League folded, the Roanoke Red Sox began play as members of the Piedmont League in 1943, with Baseball Hall of Fame inductee Heinie Manush as player/manager. The franchise would remain in the Piedmont League until 1953. Roanoke was a minor league affiliate of the Boston Red Sox and changed their moniker to the Roanoke Ro Sox in 1951. The Roanoke Red Sox were in the Piedmont Championship and lost in 1946, then won the Piedmont League Championships in 1947 and 1950. On July 24, 1953, the franchise folded with a 39–53 record.

== The ballparks ==
The original minor league ballpark was noted to be Roanoke Ballpark (1894–1896, 1906), which seated about 1,000. The ballpark was located along Jefferson Street, near the corner of today's Reserve Avenue and Jefferson Street.

Salem Municipal Stadium (1939–1942) in neighboring Salem, Virginia reportedly played host to some games of the Salem–Roanoke Friends. Built in 1932, the ballpark hosted the Salem Rebels beginning in 1955. The ballpark is still in use today, known as Salem Kiwanis Field. The ballpark hosts Roanoke College teams. The address is 731 Indiana Street, Salem, Virginia.

From 1907–1914 and 1939–1953, Roanoke teams minor league teams were noted to have played minor league home games at Maher Field. The Roanoke Tigers moved to Maher Field in 1908, as new grandstands had been erected by the Roanoke Fair Association. Maher Field hosted other events at the site. In 1914, the Detroit Tigers with Ty Cobb played the Boston Braves in an exhibition game at the Maher Field. The ballpark had a capacity of 3,000 (1939) and 7,500 (1950), with dimensions of (Left, Center, Right) 280–380–278 (1939). Today, grandstand is gone, but the playing field is still in use. Maher Field is located at 230 Reserve Avenue SW, Roanoke, Virginia.

== Notable alumni ==
- Jack Chesbro (1896) Inducted Baseball Hall of Fame, 1947
- Heinie Manush (1943, MGR) Inducted Baseball Hall of Fame, 1964
- Ken Aspromonte (1952)
- Milt Bolling (1948-1949)
- Steve Brodie (1907)
- Hal Brown (1946-1947) Baltimore Orioles Hall of Fame
- Don Buddin (1952)
- Jerry Casale (1953)
- Pete Daley (1949)
- Ike Delock (1950)
- Arnold Earley (1953)
- John Farrell (1895)
- Dave Fultz (1895)
- Fred Hatfield (1946)
- Pinky Higgins (1947–1948, MGR) 3X MLB All-Star
- Russ Kemmerer (1951)
- Ted Lepcio (1951)
- Charlie Maxwell (1947–1949) 2x MLB All-Star
- Dick Padden (1895)
- Eddie Popowski (1944–1945, MGR)
- Togie Pittinger (1896)
- Hank Schenz (1939)
- Walter Schmidt (1911)
- Frank Shaughnessy (1909–1911) Canadian Baseball Hall of Fame
- Chick Stahl (1895)
- Virgil Stallcup (1946)
- Sammy White (1950) MLB All-Star

== See also ==
- Roanoke Magicians players
- Roanoke Ro-Sox players
- Roanoke Red Sox players
- Roanoke Tigers players
- Salem-Roanoke Friends players
