= Frank Walker (baseball) =

American baseball player (1894–1974)

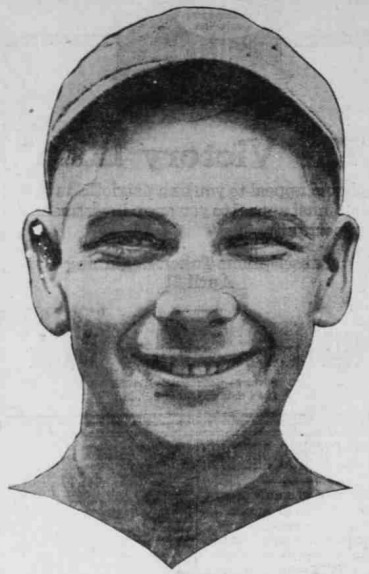
- Center fielder
- Born: September 22, 1894; Enoree, South Carolina
- Died: September 16, 1974 (aged 79); Bristol, Tennessee
- Batted: Right Threw: Right

MLB debut
- September 6, 1917, for the Detroit Tigers

Last MLB appearance
- August 8, 1925, for the New York Giants

MLB statistics
- Batting average: .214
- Hits: 87
- Triples: 5
- Stats at Baseball Reference

Teams
- Detroit Tigers (1917–1918); Philadelphia Athletics (1920–1921); New York Giants (1925)

Charles Franklin Walker (September 22, 1894 – September 16, 1974) was a Major League Baseball center fielder who played for five seasons. He played for the Detroit Tigers from 1917 to 1918, the Philadelphia Athletics from 1920 to 1921, and the New York Giants in 1925. He attended Randolph-Macon College and managed a number of years in the minor leagues.
