= Andy Bruckmiller =

American baseball player (1882–1970)

- Pitcher
- Born: January 1, 1882; Pittsburgh, Pennsylvania, U.S.
- Died: January 12, 1970 (aged 88); McKeesport, Pennsylvania, U.S.
- Batted: Right Threw: Right

MLB debut
- June 26, 1905, for the Detroit Tigers

Last MLB appearance
- June 26, 1905, for the Detroit Tigers

MLB statistics
- Win–loss record: 0–0
- Earned run average: 27.00
- Strikeouts: 1
- Stats at Baseball Reference

Teams
- Detroit Tigers (1905)

Andrew Bruckmiller (January 1, 1882 – January 12, 1970) was an American professional baseball pitcher. He appeared in one game in Major League Baseball for the Detroit Tigers in 1905, giving up three runs in one inning.
