= Harry Spratt =

American baseball player (1888-1969)

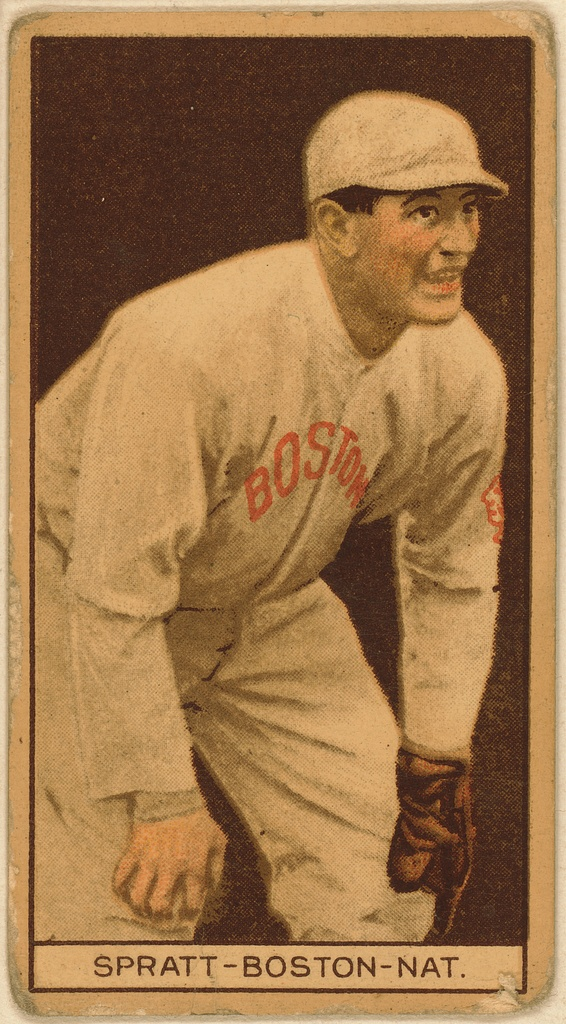
- Harry Spratt baseball card
- Shortstop / Second baseman / Center fielder
- Born: July 10, 1888; Broadford, Virginia, U.S.
- Died: July 3, 1969 (aged 80); Washington, D. C., U.S.
- Batted: Left Threw: Right

MLB debut
- April 13, 1911, for the Boston Rustlers

Last MLB appearance
- June 3, 1912, for the Boston Braves

MLB statistics
- Batting average: .247
- Home runs: 5
- Runs batted in: 28
- Stats at Baseball Reference

Teams
- Boston Rustlers / Braves (1911–1912)

Henry Lee Spratt (July 10, 1888 – July 3, 1969) was an American Major League Baseball player. He played two seasons with the Boston Rustlers / Braves from 1911 to 1912. He played as a utility infielder for the team. Prior to playing professional baseball, he attended the University of Virginia, where he was a member of Delta Chi fraternity.
