= Matt Broderick =

American baseball player (1877-1940)

- Second baseman
- Born: December 1, 1877; Lattimer, Pennsylvania, U.S.
- Died: February 26, 1940 (aged 62); Freeland, Pennsylvania, U.S.
- Batted: Right Threw: Right

MLB debut
- May 1, 1903, for the Brooklyn Superbas

Last MLB appearance
- May 6, 1903, for the Brooklyn Superbas

MLB statistics
- Batting average: .000
- Home runs: 0
- Runs batted in: 0
- Stats at Baseball Reference

Teams
- Brooklyn Superbas (1903)

Matthew Thomas Broderick (December 1, 1877 in Lattimer, Pennsylvania – February 26, 1940 in Freeland, Pennsylvania), was an American former professional baseball player who played in two games, one at second base, and one as a pinch hitter, for the Brooklyn Superbas during the 1903 baseball season.
