= Kinston Eagles (Virginia League) =

- Founded in 1925; Kinston, North Carolina

Minor league affiliations
- Previous classes: B (1925–1927)
- Previous leagues: Virginia League (1925–1927)

Team data
- Name: Kinston Eagles
- Ballpark: West End Park

The Kinston Eagles were an unaffiliated Minor League Baseball team of the Virginia League. They were located in Kinston, North Carolina. The team played its home games at West End Park, which opened in 1921.

Established in 1925, the Eagles played through the 1927 season. The Eagles played in 415 regular season games and compiled a win–loss record of 177–238.

Dozens of men played for the Eagles including Baseball Hall of Fame member Rick Ferrell.

== History ==
Kinston was represented by many excellent amateur clubs since the late nineteenth century, but it was unable to sustain a viable professional team until the mid-1920s. Earlier attempts included an aborted campaign in the Class D Eastern Carolina League in 1908 and an "outlaw league" team in 1921 and 1922. The latter was notable for being managed by former major league pitcher George Suggs and College Football Hall of Fame member Ira Rodgers. Due to the efforts of the city's business leaders, former local amateur star Elisha Lewis, and George Suggs, the town secured a professional team in the Virginia League for the 1925 season named the "Eagles".

The Eagles were a Class B team playing out of a then newly renovated stadium designed by Suggs known as West End Park. The squad had little success against other teams in their league, but was successful enough in gate receipts to validate the city's capacity to sustain a professional team. Kinston's team remained in the Virginia League for three years and then migrated to a newly reformed Eastern Carolina League. This later affiliation collapsed along with the stock market in 1929. The 1920s Eagles' roster included a young catcher named Rick Ferrell, who later had a long playing career and even longer front office career in the major leagues. In 1984, Ferrell became the only former Kinston player inducted into the Baseball Hall of Fame. Another player, Frank Armstrong, gave up baseball for a career in the armed services and became one of the most decorated generals in the history of the Air Force.
