= Joe Wall =

American baseball player (1873-1936)

- Catcher
- Born: July 24, 1873; Brooklyn, New York, U.S.
- Died: July 17, 1936 (aged 62); Brooklyn, New York, U.S.
- Batted: Left Threw: Left

MLB debut
- September 22, 1901, for the New York Giants

Last MLB appearance
- August 24, 1902, for the Brooklyn Superbas

MLB statistics
- Batting average: .300
- Home runs: 0
- Runs batted in: 1
- Stats at Baseball Reference

Teams
- New York Giants (1901–1902); Brooklyn Superbas (1902)

Joseph Francis Wall (July 24, 1873 – July 17, 1936) was an American Major League Baseball player.

== Career ==
Wall served as a catcher in 15 games for the New York Giants and Brooklyn Superbas during the 1901 and 1902 seasons. He is buried at Green-Wood Cemetery.
