= Bill Skiff =

American baseball player (1895–1976)

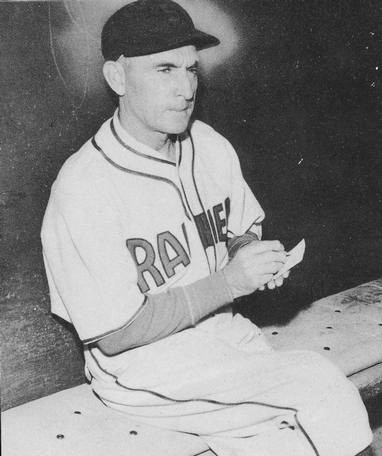
- Catcher
- Born: October 16, 1895; New Rochelle, New York, U.S.
- Died: December 25, 1976 (aged 81); Bronxville, New York, U.S.
- Batted: Right Threw: Right

MLB debut
- May 17, 1921, for the Pittsburgh Pirates

Last MLB appearance
- September 26, 1926, for the New York Yankees

MLB statistics
- Batting average: .250
- Home runs: 0
- Runs batted in: 11
- Stats at Baseball Reference

Teams
- Pittsburgh Pirates (1921); New York Yankees (1926)

William Franklin Skiff (October 16, 1895 – December 25, 1976) was an American professional baseball player, manager and scout. Although he appeared only briefly in Major League Baseball in 22 total games as a catcher and pinch hitter for the 1921 Pittsburgh Pirates and the 1926 New York Yankees, he had a long career in the minor leagues: 19 seasons as a player or player-manager, and another 14 as a manager.

Born in New Rochelle, New York, the 5 ft 10 in (1.78 m), 170 lb (77 kg) Skiff batted and threw right-handed. During his two big-league stints, he hit .250 in 56 at bats. His 14 hits included two doubles. His minor league career extended from 1916 to 1931 and 1933–51. As a manager he piloted the top-level Seattle Rainiers, Newark Bears and Kansas City Blues. He served the Yankees' organization for many years as a minor league skipper and scout.

On July 8, 1924, Bill Skiff, along with Pete Scott, was questioned during a coroner's inquest about a young woman who fell down a freight elevator shaft after visiting his room. At the time, both were players for the Kansas City Blues, a minor league team.[

Skiff died at age 81 in Bronxville, New York.
