= Dave Robertson (baseball) =

American baseball player (1889–1970)

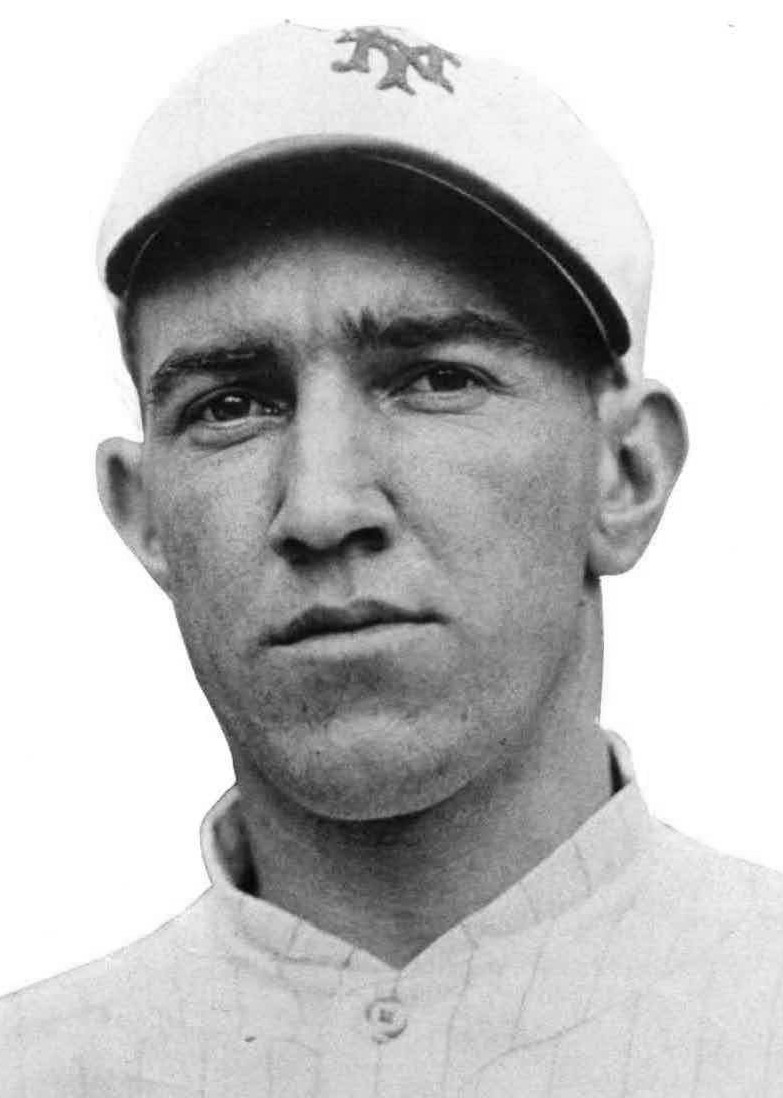
- Outfielder
- Born: September 25, 1889; Portsmouth, Virginia, U.S.
- Died: November 5, 1970 (aged 81); Virginia Beach, Virginia, U.S.
- Batted: Left Threw: Left

MLB debut
- June 5, 1912, for the New York Giants

Last MLB appearance
- September 27, 1922, for the New York Giants

MLB statistics
- Batting average: .287
- Home runs: 47
- Runs batted in: 364
- Stats at Baseball Reference

Teams
- New York Giants (1912, 1914–1917, 1919); Chicago Cubs (1919–1921); Pittsburgh Pirates (1921); New York Giants (1922)

Career highlights and awards
- World Series champion (1922); 2× NL home run leader (1916, 1917)

Davis Aydelotte Robertson (September 25, 1889 – November 5, 1970) was an American professional baseball player. He was an outfielder over parts of nine seasons with the New York Giants, Chicago Cubs, and Pittsburgh Pirates.

Robertson was born in Portsmouth, Virginia. He attended North Carolina State University after matriculating at Maury High School and Norfolk Academy.

In 1916 and 1917, he tied for the National League lead in home runs (with Cy Williams and Gavvy Cravath, respectively) while playing for New York. The short-distanced right field fence at the Polo Grounds was a frequent target of long drives hit by Robertson and his Giants' teammate, Benny Kauff. Their hits to right field became so much of an issue that National League officials convened following the 1916 baseball season. Baseball officials decided to amend Rule #1, which read the shortest distance from a fence or stand on fair territory to the home base should be 235 feet. The amendment to the rule changed the shortest distance from a stand or fence to 270 feet.

Robertson played for the Giants in the 1917 World Series against the Chicago White Sox, his 11 hits leading the team in the Series in a losing cause. A member of the Giants during the 1922 season, he did not make an appearance in the 1922 World Series. The champion Giants swept all four games of that Series from their crosstown rival New York Yankees.

In a nine-year major-league career, Robertson posted a .287 batting average (812-2830) with 366 runs, 47 home runs and 364 RBI in 804 games played. His on-base percentage was .318 and slugging percentage was .409. He surpassed the .300 batting mark three times. On September 14, 1920, he went 5-5 as a member of the Cubs. On August 19, 1921, he had 8 RBI in a game as a member of the Pirates. Eleven days later, on August 30, he hit for the cycle.

Robertson died at the age of 81 in Virginia Beach, Virginia.

== See also ==
- List of Major League Baseball players to hit for the cycle
- List of Major League Baseball annual home run leaders

Achievements
Preceded by George Sisler	Hitting for the cycle August 30, 1921	Succeeded by Ross Youngs
