= Portsmouth Truckers =

The Portsmouth Truckers were an American professional baseball team in Minor League Baseball. Based in Portsmouth, Virginia, and primarily competing in the Virginia League, the team existed on-and-off from 1895 to 1928. The team played in the Piedmont League in 1935, when they were affiliated with the Chicago Cubs.

In 1920, under managers Jim Barton and Jim Viox, the team won the first of multiple league championships. They won their next title the next season, also under Viox's guidance. They won their third and final league championship in 1927, under the leadership of Zinn Beck.
