= Richmond Colts =

- 1894–1953; Richmond, Virginia

Minor league affiliations
- Class: B (1932–1953)
- Previous leagues: Virginia League (1894); Virginia League (1900); Virginia League (1906–1914, 1918–1928); Eastern League (1932); Piedmont League (1933–1953)

Major league affiliations
- Team: Philadelphia Athletics (1935–1936); New York Giants (1937-38, 1940, 1944-50)

Minor league titles
- League titles: 1908, 1923–1926, 1935, 1952

Team data
- Name: Colts
- Ballpark: Broad Street Park (1906–1912); Tate Field (1921–1941); Mooers Field (1942?–1953)
- Owners/ Operators: Eddie Mooers (1931–1954); Percy Dawson (1920s)

The Richmond Colts were a minor league baseball team based in Richmond, Virginia that existed on-and-off from 1894 to 1953. They played in the Virginia League in 1894, and in another Virginia League in 1900, and another Virginia League from 1906 to 1914 and from 1918 to 1928. In 1932, they played in the Eastern League and from 1933 to 1953, they played in the Piedmont League.

They were affiliated with the Philadelphia Athletics from 1935 to 1936, and the New York Giants from 1937 to 1938, in 1940, and from 1944 to 1950. As was more common during that time period, the Colts occasionally played exhibition games against major league teams.

One of their home ballparks was Mooers Field, from the early 1940s until 1953, named after Eddie Mooers, who purchased the team in 1931. Prior to Mooers Field, the team played at Tate Field on Mayo Island in the James River, but that facility was destroyed in a fire in May 1941.

In 1953, the team signed Whit Graves as its first black player.

When Richmond obtained a Class AAA franchise in 1954, Mooers moved the Colts to Colonial Heights' Shepherd Stadium. Harry Seibold purchased the team and renamed it the Virginians. Mooers Field was turned into a racing track, and then torn down in 1958.

== League championships ==
Under manager Perry Lipe in 1908, the Colts won their first league championship. They were co-league champions in 1923 under manager Dave Robertson, and from 1924 to 1926 they won the league championship every year. In 1924, they were managed by Jack Onslow; in 1925, Percy Dawson and in 1926, Troy Agnew, Guy Lacy and Rube Oldring. They won a league championship again in 1935, under manager Eddie Rommel. In 1952, they won their final league championship, under manager Tom O'Connell.
