= Win Clark =

American baseball player (1875–1959)

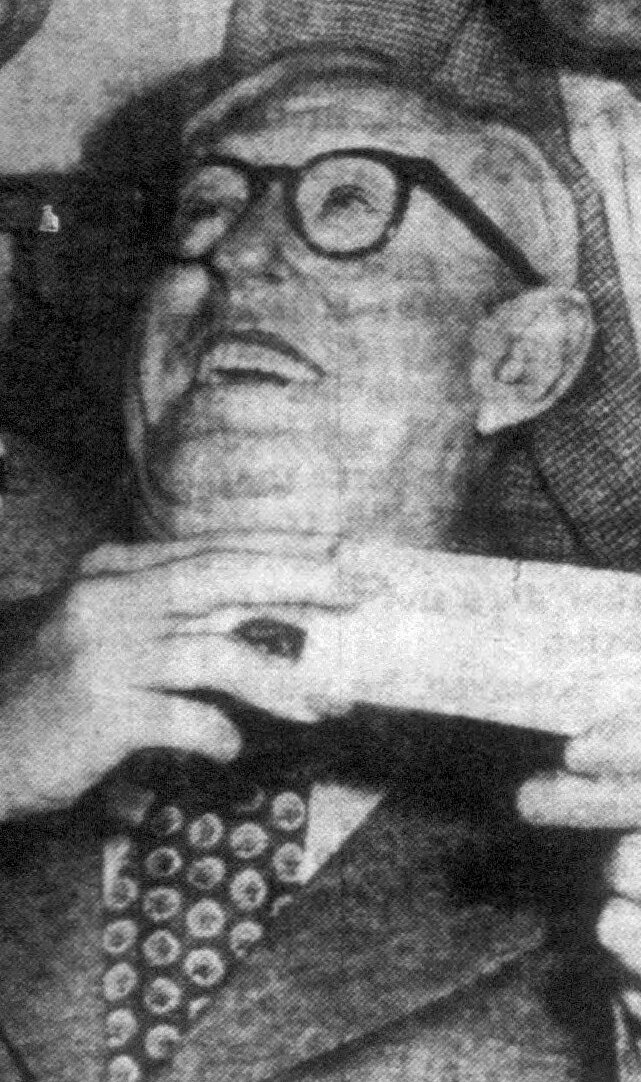
- Clark in 1953
- Infielder
- Born: April 11, 1875; Circleville, Ohio, U.S.
- Died: April 15, 1959 (aged 84); Los Angeles, California, U.S.
- Batted: Right Threw: Right

MLB debut
- July 12, 1897, for the Louisville Colonels

Last MLB appearance
- July 14, 1897, for the Louisville Colonels

MLB statistics
- Batting average: .188
- Home runs: 0
- Runs batted in: 2
- Stats at Baseball Reference

Teams
- Louisville Colonels (1897)

William Winfield Clark (April 11, 1875 – April 15, 1959) was an American professional baseball player. He was an infielder for one season (1897) with the Louisville Colonels. For his career, he compiled a .188 batting average in 16 at-bats, with two runs batted in.

In 1908, Clark was managing the Columbia (S.C.) Chicks of the South Atlantic League when he was stabbed by one of his own players, John Bender (the brother of Baseball Hall of Fame member Chief Bender). He was let go as Columbia manager following that season.

He was born in Circleville, Ohio and later died in Los Angeles, California at the age of 84.
