= Norfolk Jewels =

- 1897–1898; Norfolk, Virginia

Minor league affiliations
- Class: Class A (1897); Class B (1898)
- League: Atlantic League (1897–1898)

Major league affiliations
- Team: None

Minor league titles
- League titles (0): None

Team data
- Name: Norfolk Jewels (1897–1898)
- Ballpark: Bain Field* (1897–1898)

The Norfolk Jewels were a minor league baseball team based in Norfolk, Virginia. In 1897 and 1898, the Norfolk Jewels played as members of the Atlantic League in both seasons. The Jewels were immediately preceded by the 1896 Norfolk Braves of the Virginia League.

== History ==
The 1896 Norfolk Braves played as a member of the Virginia League, preceding the Jewels in minor league play.

The 1897 Norfolk Jewels began play as members of the eight–team, Class A level, Atlantic League. Norfolk joined the Hartford Bluebirds, Lancaster Maroons, Newark Colts, Paterson Silk Weavers, Philadelphia Athletics, Reading Coal Heavers and Richmond Bluebirds in beginning league play on April 26, 1897.

The Norfolk Jewels placed 5th in the 1897 Atlantic League standings. The Jewels ended the season with a record of 66–72, playing the season under managers Charlie Schafer and Billy Smith. Norfolk finished 25.5 games behind the 1st place Lancaster Maroons in the final standings. No playoffs were held.

In their final season of Atlantic League play, the Jewels finished last. Norfolk ended the 1898 with a record of 47–79 to finish in 8th place. Led by manager Charley Jewell, the Jewels finished 35.5 games behind the 1st place Richmond Bluebirds.

The Jewels were succeeded in Norfolk by the 1900 Norfolk Phenoms, who resumed minor league play as members of the Virginia League.

== The ballpark ==
The name of the home ballpark of the 1897 and 1898 Norfolk Jewels is not directly referenced. Bain Field in Norfolk, was originally called "League Park." The date League Park was constructed is unknown, but newspaper coverage for baseball games there started as early as 1894.

== Timeline ==
Year(s)	# Yrs.	Team	Level	League
1897	1	Norfolk Jewels	Class B	Atlantic League
1898	1	Norfolk Jewels	Class A	Atlantic League

== Year–by–year records ==
Year	Record	Finish	Manager	Playoffs/notes
1897	66–72	5th	Charlie Schafer / Billy Smith	No playoffs held
1898	47–79	8th	Charley Jewell	No playoffs held

== Notable alumni ==
- Tun Berger (1898)
- Stub Brown (1897)
- Fritz Clausen (1897)
- Henry Cote (1897)
- Brownie Foreman (1898)
- George Fox (1898)
- Bill George (1898)
- John Gilroy (1897)
- Scott Hardesty (1898)
- Mike Heydon (1897)
- Bert Inks (1898)
- Billy Klusman (1898)
- Jimmy Knowles (1897)
- Dan Leahy (1897)
- Tom Maher (1898)
- Lefty Marr (1898)
- Doc Newton (1897)
- Doc Sechrist (1897)
- Harry Staley (1898)
- Farmer Steelman (1898)
- Pop Tate (1897)
- Jack Wentz (1897–1898)
- Bobby Wheelock (1898–1898)

=== See also ===
Norfolk Jewels players
