= Norfolk Braves =

- 1894–1896; Norfolk, Virginia

Minor league affiliations
- Class: Independent (1894; Class B (1895–1896)
- League: Virginia League (1894–1896)

Major league affiliations
- Team: None

Minor league titles
- League titles (0): None
- Conference titles (1): 1896

Team data
- Name: Norfolk Clam Diggers (1894); Norfolk Clams (1895); Norfolk Braves (1896)
- Ballpark: Bain Field* (1894–1896)

The Norfolk Braves were a minor league baseball team based in Norfolk, Virginia in 1896. The Norfolk Braves played as members of the Virginia League. The Braves were immediately preceded in Virginia League play by the 1894 Norfolk "Clam Diggers" and the 1895 Norfolk "Clams" in the era when team nicknames were informal and changed frequently.

The Braves were succeeded in Norfolk by the 1987 Norfolk Jewels, who played as members of the Atlantic League. The Norfolk Tides continue minor league play today in Norfolk.

== History ==
The 1896 Norfolk Braves played as a member of the Virginia League, succeeding the Clam Diggers and Clams in Virginia League play.

In 1894, the Virginia League began play as an Independent league. The Norfolk Clam Diggers joined the Lynchburg Hill Climbers, Petersburg Farmers, Richmond Bluebirds, Roanoke Magicians, Staunton Hayseeds/Newport News-Hampton Deckhands teams in 1894 league play.

The 1894 Norfolk "Clam Diggers" placed 2nd in the Virginia League final standings. With a record of 66–45, the Clam Diggers played the season under managers James Gill and Camden Sommers. The 1894 Norfolk team was also referred to as the "Oystermen." Norfolk finished 3.5 games behind the first place Petersburg Farmers in the final standings.

Norfolk continued 1895 Virginia League play, as the "Clams" placed third in the six–team league, with a record of 55–61. The managers were Camden Sommers, A.A. O'Neal, William F. Hoggins, and Pop Tate. The 1895 team was also referred to as the "Crows." Norfolk ended the season 19.0 games behind the first place Richmond Bluebirds in the overall standings, as the Virginia League upgraded to a Class B level league.

The Norfolk Braves placed second in the 1896 Class B level Atlantic League. The Braves ended the season with a record of 70–60, playing the season under managers Claude McFarland and W. B Bradley. In the final standings, the Braves finished 3.0 games behind the first place Richmond Blue Birds in the six–team league. The 1896 Atlantic League played three partial seasons, with separate standings and the Braves won one of the partial season standings. The Virginia League did not return to play in 1897 and Norfolk switched leagues.

The next season, the Braves were succeeded in Norfolk by the 1897 Norfolk Jewels, who played as members of the eight–team, Class A level, Atlantic League.

== The ballpark ==
The name of the home minor league ballpark of the Norfolk teams from 1894 to 1896 is not directly referenced. Norfolk's Bain Field was originally called "League Park" and was in use in the era. When League Park was originally constructed is unknown, however newspaper coverage for baseball games at League Park started as early as 1894.

== Timeline ==
Year(s)	# Yrs.	Team	Level	League
1894	1	Norfolk Clam Diggers	Independent	Virginia League
1895	1	Norfolk Clams	Class B	Virginia League
1896	1	Norfolk Braves	Class B	Virginia League

== Year–by–year records ==
Year	Record	Finish	Manager	Playoffs/notes
1894	66–45	2nd	James Gill / Camden Sommers	No playoffs held
1895	55–61	3rd	Camden Sommers / A.A. O'Neal / William F. Hoggins / Pop Tate	No playoffs held
1896	70–60	2nd	Claude McFarland / W.B Bradley	No playoffs held

== Notable alumni ==
- Frank Bowerman (1896)
- Fritz Clausen (1896)
- Dick Cogan (1894)
- Harry Colliflower (1894–1985)
- Joe Corbett (1896)
- John Corcoran (1894-1895)
- Henry Cote (1895)
- Ira Davis (1896)
- Jocko Fields (1896)
- Phil Geier (1895)
- Jim Gilman (1895)
- John Gilroy (1896)
- Bob Langsford (1896)
- Tacks Latimer (1895)
- Alfred Lawson (1895)
- Bill Kissinger (1894)
- John McCloskey (1894)
- Tom McCreery (1894–1895)
- Ambrose McGann (1895)
- Dan McGann (1895)
- Frank McPartlin (1895)
- Alex McFarlan (1896)
- Hal O'Hagan (1894–1895)
- Charlie Petty (1894)
- Crazy Schmit (1896)
- Doc Sechrist (1896)
- Dummy Stephenson (1896)
- Pop Tate (1895, MGR)
- John Thornton (1894–1895)
- Harry Truby (1894)
- Jack Wentz (1896)
- Tom Williams (1895)
- Pete Woodruff (1894)
- Bill Wynne (1895)
- Norfolk Braves players
- Norfolk Clam Eaters players
- Norfolk Clams players
