= Jack Chesbro =

American baseball player (1874–1931)

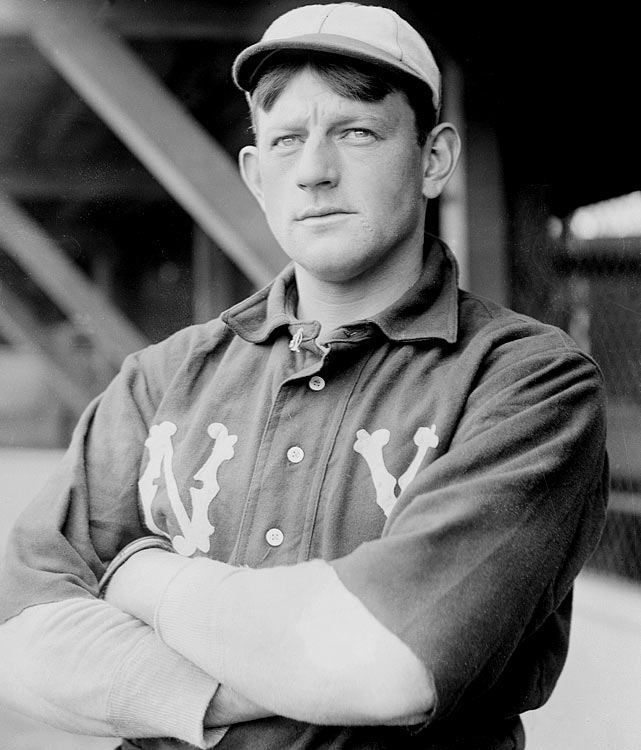
- Chesbro with the Highlanders
- Pitcher
- Born: June 5, 1874; North Adams, Massachusetts, U.S.
- Died: November 6, 1931 (aged 57); Conway, Massachusetts, U.S.
- Batted: Right Threw: Right

MLB debut
- July 12, 1899, for the Pittsburgh Pirates

Last MLB appearance
- October 2, 1909, for the Boston Red Sox

MLB statistics
- Win–loss record: 198–132
- Earned run average: 2.68
- Strikeouts: 1,265
- Stats at Baseball Reference

Teams
- Pittsburgh Pirates (1899–1902); New York Highlanders (1903–1909); Boston Red Sox (1909)

Career highlights and awards
- 2× wins leader (1902, 1904)

Member of the National

Baseball Hall of Fame
- Induction: 1946
- Election method: Old-Timers Committee

John Dwight Chesbro (June 5, 1874 – November 6, 1931) was an American professional baseball pitcher. Nicknamed "Happy Jack", Chesbro played for the Pittsburgh Pirates (1899–1902), the New York Highlanders (1903–1909), and the Boston Red Sox (1909) of Major League Baseball (MLB). Chesbro finished his career with a 198–132 win–loss record, a 2.68 earned run average, and 1,265 strikeouts. His 41 wins during the 1904 season remains an American League record. Though some pitchers have won more games in some seasons prior to 1901, historians demarcating 1901 as the beginning of 'modern-era' major league baseball refer to and credit Jack Chesbro and his 1904 win-total as the modern era major league record and its holder. Some view Chesbro's 41 wins in a season as an unbreakable record.

Chesbro's 1904 pitching totals of 51 games started and 48 complete games also fall into the same historical category as his 1904 wins total, as they are all-time American League single-season records. These 1904 single-season totals for games started and complete games, like the wins total, are also the most recorded by a pitcher in either the American or National League since the beginning of the 20th century and the co-existence of the American and National Leagues as major leagues. If one demarcates 1901 as the beginning of major league baseball's modern era, Jack Chesbro holds the modern era major league historical single-season records for wins by a pitcher (41), games started by a pitcher (51), and complete games pitched (48).

Chesbro was elected to the National Baseball Hall of Fame in 1946 by the Veterans Committee, though he had received little consideration from the Baseball Writers' Association of America (BBWAA). Some baseball historians consider the 1946 election a mistake, and believe that Chesbro was elected solely on the basis of his 1904 season.

== Early life ==
John Dwight Chesbro was born on June 5, 1874, in Houghtonville, a village in North Adams, Massachusetts. He was the fourth of five children of Chad Brown Chesebrough, a shoemaker, and Martha Jane Fralensburgh.

In 1892, Chesbro began playing for a sandlot ball team in Houghtonville. He worked in 1894 as an attendant at the Middletown State Homeopathic Hospital in Middletown, New York in order to play for the Asylums, the team representing the mental hospital. There, an inmate gave Chesbro the nickname "Happy Jack", due to his pleasant demeanor.

== Professional career ==
=== Minor leagues ===
Chesbro began his professional career in minor league baseball in 1895. That year, he pitched for the Albany Senators of the New York State League until they folded, at which point he joined the Johnstown Buckskins. When the league disbanded during the season, he joined the Springfield Maroons of the Eastern League. In 1896, Chesbro pitched for the Roanoke Magicians of the Virginia League, until it disbanded. He pitched the remainder of the 1896 season in Cooperstown, New York for the Cooperstown Athletics. There, the local newspaper shortened his last name to "Chesbro" so that it would fit in the box score.

Chesbro pitched for the Richmond, Virginia based Richmond Bluebirds of the Atlantic League from 1897 through 1899. After the 1898 season, he was drafted by Ned Hanlon of the Baltimore Orioles. However, Hanlon took a job with the Brooklyn Superbas and the Orioles were nearly contracted, resulting in Chesbro not signing with Baltimore, as Hanlon allowed the option to lapse. He returned to Richmond for the 1899 season.

=== Pittsburgh Pirates (1899–1902) ===
Chesbro was sold by Richmond to the Pittsburgh Pirates on July 7, 1899, for $1,500 ($58,050 in current dollar terms). He made his Major League Baseball (MLB) debut with the Pirates on July 12, 1899. He recorded a 6–9 win–loss record for the 1899 Pirates. After the season, on December 8, 1899, Chesbro was traded with George Fox, Art Madison, John O'Brien, and $25,000 ($967,500 in current dollar terms) to the Louisville Colonels for Honus Wagner, Fred Clarke, Bert Cunningham, Mike Kelley, Tacks Latimer, Tommy Leach, Tom Messitt, Deacon Phillippe, Claude Ritchey, Rube Waddell, Jack Wadsworth, and Chief Zimmer. The Louisville club dissolved that offseason, and Chesbro, Fox, Madison and O'Brien were assigned to Pittsburgh in March as the National League (NL) reduced from 12 to eight teams.

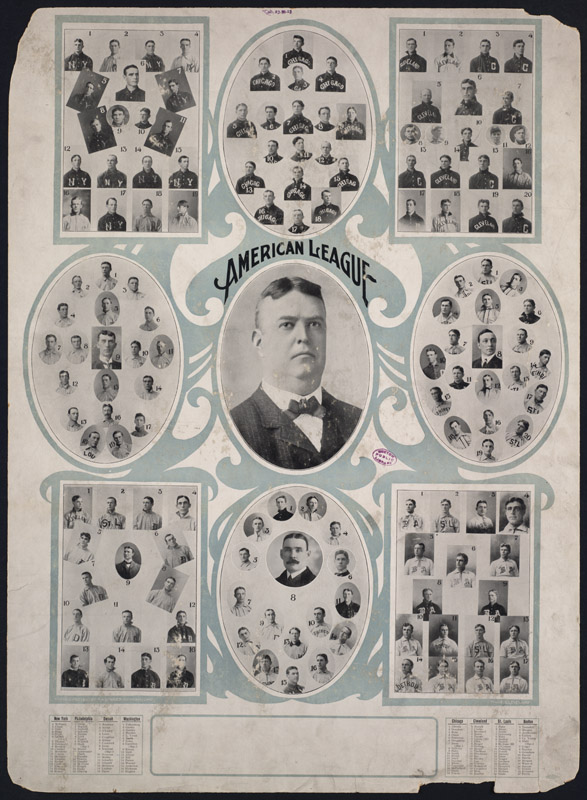
A photographic montage of American League teams and players in 1903

After going 15–13 for the 1900 Pirates, Chesbro won 21 games for the 1901 Pirates, while leading the NL with six shutouts. He went 28–6 with a 2.17 earned run average (ERA) for the 1902 Pirates, leading the NL in wins and shutouts. The Pirates won the National League pennant in 1901 and 1902.

=== New York Highlanders (1903–1909) ===
At the end of the 1902 season, the upstart American League (AL) began to entice NL stars to join their league by offering competitive salaries. Chesbro agreed to sign with a new AL franchise, the New York Highlanders (presently known as the New York Yankees), for the 1903 season, for a $1,000 bonus ($37,212 in current dollar terms) to join the AL. The news broke when Jesse Tannehill, who also agreed to join the Highlanders, told Pirates owner Barney Dreyfuss about the planned defection while under the influence of pain medication. When he refused to participate in a postseason series, Dreyfuss released Chesbro from the Pirates.

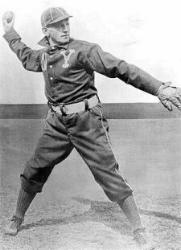
Chesbro pitching for the Highlanders

Chesbro pitched the Highlanders' first game. He finished the 1903 season with a 21–15 record. Chesbro began throwing a spitball in the 1904 season, which he learned from Elmer Stricklett, the inventor of the spitball. Chesbro also began working on a "slow ball". That year, he started 51 games and finished 48 while posting a 1.82 ERA, striking out 239 batters, and recording 41 wins and 48 complete games over 454 2/3 innings pitched, setting MLB records for wins, complete games, and innings pitched in a season. That year, no other pitcher in the league won more than 26. Chesbro won 14 straight games from May 14 through July 4, a New York franchise record that stood until Roger Clemens broke it in 2001. His 239 strikeouts remained a team record until Ron Guidry struck out 248 in 1978. On the last day of the season, in a game against the Boston Americans (now known as the Boston Red Sox), he threw a wild pitch in the top of the ninth inning, allowing the winning run to score from third base and causing the Highlanders to lose the pennant to Boston. The ruling on this play was controversial. Even after Chesbro's death in 1931, his widow, with the support of former Highlanders manager Clark Griffith, continued to claim that the pitch was a passed ball, and blamed the winning run on catcher Red Kleinow.

Before the 1905 season, Chesbro announced that he had created a pitch he called the "jump ball". He struggled in the 1905 season, registering a 19–15 record. During the 1905 season, Chesbro was involved in the first squeeze play in major league baseball. At third base, Chesbro mistakenly thought he had received a steal sign from manager Clark Griffith, while Willie Keeler bunted for a hit. As Chesbro scored, Griffith made a note of the play and taught it in spring training the following season.

Many baseball observers expected Chesbro to return to form in 1906. That season, Chesbro registered a 23–17 record while leading the AL in earned runs allowed. He was removed from his starts 16 times, the most in the AL.

Chesbro announced he would work on keeping his weight down prior to the 1907 season, but announced his intentions to retire in February 1907. In March 1907, he announced he would return, but not at a pay cut. He signed a new contract two weeks into the 1907 season, in which he went 10–10.

After the 1907 season, Chesbro announced that he was giving up the experimental spitball, intending to return to the "old style of pitching" in 1908. He finished the 1908 season with a 14–20 record.

Prior to the 1909 season, Chesbro was assigned to the Indianapolis Indians of the American Association, a minor league affiliate of the Highlanders. However, Chesbro threatened to retire if transferred there, and did not report to the Highlanders at first. Chesbro made nine appearances for the Highlanders in 1909, before he was waived and claimed by the Boston Red Sox in September 1909.

=== Boston Red Sox (1909) ===
Chesbro pitched one game for the Red Sox, the season finale against the Yankees. The Red Sox returned Chesbro to the Highlanders prior to the 1910 season, but he was placed on the ineligible list after he refused to report to the minor leagues.

== Post-playing career ==
Chesbro returned to Massachusetts during the 1910 season, where he worked on a farm in Conway, Massachusetts, that he purchased a decade prior. He pitched for a semi-professional baseball team in Whitinsville, Massachusetts, leading them to a championship. Chesbro coached for Massachusetts Agricultural College (presently known as the University of Massachusetts Amherst) in 1911 and continued to pitch for semipro clubs in Massachusetts.

Chesbro met with Highlanders owner Frank J. Farrell and new manager Harry Wolverton in February 1912 about attempting a comeback. Wolverton agreed to give Chesbro a chance at pitching for the Highlanders. However, before leaving for camp he reconsidered and released Chesbro. Chesbro's request for reinstatement as a free agent was granted in March, while the Highlanders granted him his unconditional release. Chesbro decided to travel to Hot Springs, Arkansas, where teams participated in spring training, in an attempt to find a team willing to give him a chance at a comeback. He worked out with Brooklyn and Pittsburgh, but both teams passed on him.

Chesbro appeared in an old-timers game at Braves Field, sponsored by The Boston Post to benefit Boston Children's Hospital, on September 11, 1922. He served as a Washington Senators coach in 1924, which were managed by his former Highlanders manager, Clark Griffith. However, he and Ben Egan were let go when the Senators hired Al Schacht on June 1. In 1927, he managed a minor league team in South Deerfield, Massachusetts, pitching for the team on occasion.

== Legacy ==
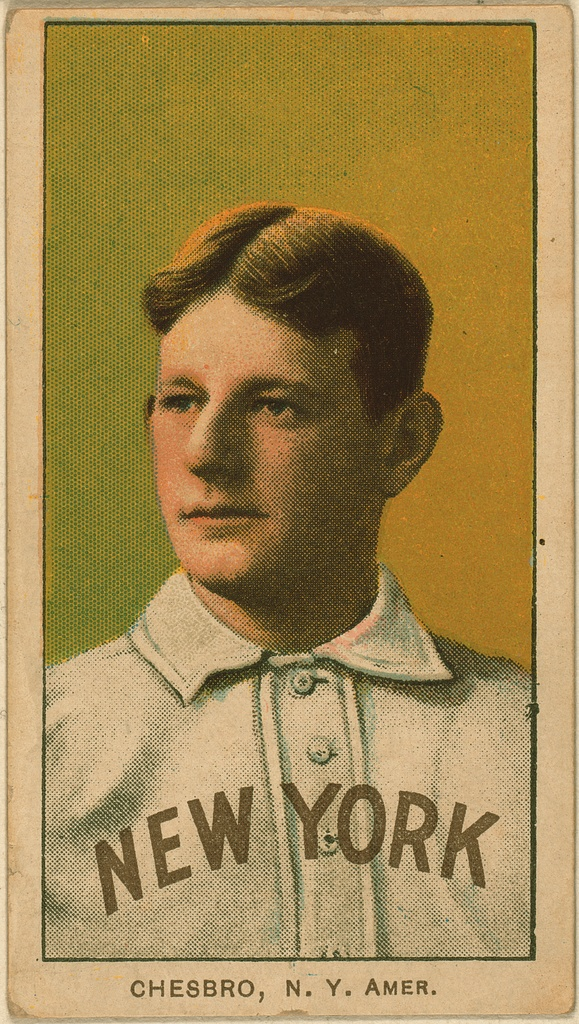
Chesbro's 1909–1911 American Tobacco Company baseball card

Chesbro was inducted into the National Baseball Hall of Fame in 1946 by the Veterans Committee, which considers individuals who are eligible for the Hall of Fame, but no longer eligible to be elected by the Baseball Writers' Association of America (BBWAA). That year, the Veterans Committee elected eleven players: Chesbro, Jesse Burkett, Frank Chance, Johnny Evers, Clark Griffith, Tommy McCarthy, Joe McGinnity, Eddie Plank, Joe Tinker, Rube Waddell, and Ed Walsh. During years where Chesbro was eligible on the BBWAA ballot, Chesbro received zero votes in the 1936 balloting, one vote in the 1937 balloting, two votes in the 1938 balloting, and six votes in the 1939 balloting, zero votes in the 1942 balloting, and zero votes in the 1945 balloting.

Chesbro's 1904 record for games won in a season (41 wins) has stood for over a century—one of the oldest major records in baseball, or in any other sport. Under current playing practices, his record is unbreakable. Chesbro started 51 games that season (plus 4 relief appearances) and pitched 48 complete games, for a record of 41–12. Today, it is uncommon for a pitcher to start even 35 games in a season and complete games are a rarity. The only other 40-win season since 1900 was 40 by Ed Walsh in 1908, and only three other pitchers in the modern era have won as many as 35--Christy Mathewson (37 in 1908), Walter Johnson (36 in 1913) and Joe McGinnity (35 in 1904). The last pitcher to win as many as 30 games was Denny McLain in 1968. The pitcher's mound was lowered to its current height of 10 inches in 1969, and since then no pitcher has won more than 27 games in a season.

Tinker considered Chesbro one of the six toughest pitchers he faced in MLB. Dan Holmes, who runs the Hall of Fame's website, called Chesbro "one of the best pitchers in the game at that time."

However, Chesbro's induction is considered dubious, as his overall career was overshadowed by his 1904 season. Baseball historian Bill James considers Chesbro to be undeserving of induction to the Hall of Fame. In particular, James compared Chesbro's statistics to those of former Pittsburgh Pirate teammates Deacon Phillippe (189–109, 2.59), Sam Leever (194–100, 2.47), and Jesse Tannehill (197–117, 2.80), none of whom are in the Hall of Fame. In his book The Politics of Glory, James charged that the induction of undeserving players created a "second tier" in the Hall of Fame. James claimed that Chesbro was inducted into the Hall of Fame solely on the basis of his 1904 season, even though other pitchers who did not make the Hall of Fame have similar career statistics.

== Personal life ==
Chesbro married Mabel Suttleworth of Conway, Massachusetts, in 1896. After his retirement, Chesbro farmed and raised poultry in Conway, where he died on November 6, 1931, of a myocardial infarction; he was buried at Howland Cemetery in Conway. Mabel died in 1940.

== See also ==
- List of Major League Baseball annual wins leaders
- List of Major League Baseball career hit batsmen leaders
