= Tacks Latimer =

American baseball player (1875–1936)

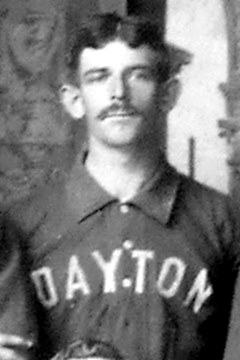
- Catcher
- Born: November 30, 1875; Loveland, Ohio, U.S.
- Died: April 24, 1936 (aged 60); Loveland, Ohio, U.S.
- Batted: Right Threw: Right

MLB debut
- October 1, 1898, for the New York Giants

Last MLB appearance
- September 8, 1902, for the Brooklyn Superbas

MLB statistics
- Batting average: .221
- Home runs: 0
- Runs batted in: 7
- Stats at Baseball Reference

Teams
- New York Giants (1898); Louisville Colonels (1899); Pittsburgh Pirates (1900); Baltimore Orioles (1901); Brooklyn Superbas (1902)
Criminal information
Status	Pardoned on December 24, 1930
Conviction	Second-degree murder
Penalty	Life imprisonment
Details
Victims	Charles Mackrodt
Date	November 26, 1924
Location	Xenia, Ohio
Weapon	.38 caliber revolver
Imprisoned at	Ohio State Penitentiary

Clifford Wesley "Tacks" Latimer (November 30, 1875 – April 24, 1936) was an American professional baseball catcher who played in Major League Baseball for the New York Giants, Louisville Colonels, Pittsburgh Pirates, Baltimore Orioles, and Brooklyn Superbas from 1898 to 1902. Including the years he played only in the minor leagues or as a semi-professional, Latimer's career ranged from 1895 to 1908.

After his playing career ended, Latimer became a police officer with the Pennsylvania Railroad. In 1924, after a dispute with another police officer, Latimer shot him four times in the back, killing him. Latimer was found guilty of second-degree murder and sentenced to life imprisonment. He received a pardon in 1930 for his heroism during a prison break.

== Early life ==
Clifford Wesley Lattimer was born in Loveland, Ohio, on November 30, 1875, to John Wesley and Nora (née McAdams) Lattimer. At some point, his name was changed to "Latimer". He began playing baseball with the Cincinnati Gymnasium Club, where he attracted the attention of scouts.

== Baseball career ==
Latimer made his professional baseball debut with the Montgomery Grays of the Southern Association in 1895. He also played for the Norfolk Crows of the Virginia State League and Findlay Sluggers of the Interstate League. In 1897, he played semi-professional baseball in Chillicothe, Ohio, and played professionally for the Minneapolis Millers of the Western League. In 1898, he played for the Austin Senators of the Texas League and Dayton Old Soldiers of the Interstate League, before he signed with the New York Giants of the National League, making his major league debut in October. He played in five games for the Giants, and batted .294 (5-for-17).

Though Latimer signed with the Giants for the 1899 season, he began the season with Dayton. He signed with the Youngstown Little Giants of the Interstate League in May. Buck Ewing, the manager of the National League's Cincinnati Reds, offered to sign Latimer on a trial basis, but Latimer refused unless the signing was permanent. In September 1899, the Louisville Colonels of the National League purchased Latimer from Youngstown. He played in nine games for Louisville, and batted .276 (8-for-29).

Following the 1899 season, Colonels' owner Barney Dreyfuss purchased a controlling stake in the Pittsburgh Pirates, and consolidated the two teams in Pittsburgh. Louisville traded Latimer, Fred Clarke, Honus Wagner, Deacon Phillippe, Patsy Flaherty, Chief Zimmer, Claude Ritchey, Tommy Leach, Rube Waddell, Walt Woods, Bert Cunningham, Jack Wadsworth, Tom Messitt, and Mike Kelley for Jack Chesbro, George Fox, Art Madison, and John O'Brien. He played in four games for the Pirates, batting .333 (4-for-12), before he was released to the Syracuse Stars of the Eastern League after the Pirates acquired Jack O'Connor. In July, he was released by Syracuse and joined New Castle Quakers of the Interstate League.

After the 1900 season, John McGraw signed Latimer to the Baltimore Orioles of the upstart American League. He was to be the backup catcher to Wilbert Robinson. He played in one game for Baltimore in April 1901, batting 1-for-4. Roger Bresnahan, who previously played as a pitcher, became a catcher for Baltimore, and the team released Latimer. He played for the Fort Wayne Railroaders of the Western Association, but was released in July due to his high salary. He then signed with the St. Paul Saints of the Western League. He declined to re-sign with St. Paul for the 1902 season.

Latimer began the 1902 season with the Atlanta Firemen of the Southern Association. In August, he suffered a broken finger, and was released by Atlanta because he refused to play for half pay while injured. He signed with the Brooklyn Superbas of the National League. He played in eight games for Brooklyn, batting 1-for-24 (.042), before Brooklyn's manager, Ned Hanlon, furloughed him for the remainder of the season.

In 1903, Hanlon assigned Latimer to the Baltimore Orioles of the Eastern League. Refusing to report, Latimer demanded and received his release. Latimer requested a tryout with the Reds, but was turned down. He signed with the Denver Grizzlies of the Western League. He was released by Denver in July, and signed with the Rock Island Islanders of the Illinois–Indiana–Iowa League. He signed with the Springfield Hustlers of the Illinois-Indiana-Iowa League for the 1904 season.

Latimer began the 1905 season with the Newark Sailors of the Eastern League and also played for the Norwich Reds of the Connecticut State League, until he was released in August after he refused a pay cut. In 1906, he played for the York Penn Parks, Lancaster Red Roses, and Harrisburg Senators of the Tri-State League. He was released by Lancaster in August, and finished the season with the Cumberland Rooters of the Pennsylvania–Ohio–Maryland League. He signed with Nashville Volunteers of the Southern Association for the 1907 season. He was released by Nashville in May, and finished the season with the Birmingham Barons, also in the Southern Association. He played for the McKeesport Tubers of the Ohio-Pennsylvania League in 1908, but he struggled and was released in July. Latimer was unable to find a team to play for in 1909.

== Post-playing career ==
During Latimer's playing, he served as a part-time scout for the teams he played for in the minor leagues. He scouted for the Reds while Clark Griffith was their manager, after his playing career ended. Latimer became a full-time scout for the Pirates, and the Society for American Baseball Research has credited him with discovering Bob Vail and George Suggs. He may have also discovered Red Faber, and some contemporary sources credited him with finding Rube Waddell.

Latimer ran for sheriff of Greene County, Ohio, as a Republican in 1918, but lost. In either 1920 or 1921, Latimer became a detective for the Pennsylvania Railroad in Xenia, Ohio.

== Criminal ==
Latimer served under Charles Mackrodt, a lieutenant with the Pennsylvania Railroad's police. They were friends, until Mackrodt was dismissed from the force. Mackrodt blamed Latimer for his dismissal. On November 26, 1924, Mackrodt confronted Latimer at the main intersection in Xenia, where Mackrodt allegedly threatened Latimer and challenged him to a fight in an alley. When Mackrodt turned away, Latimer shot Mackrodt four times with a .38 caliber revolver, killing him instantly. One bullet struck Mackrodt in the side and three struck him in the back. Latimer surrendered to police at the courthouse, which was across the street, and was charged with first-degree murder. He pled not guilty and was held without bond pending trial.

In his trial, which began on December 29, 1924, Latimer claimed that he shot Mackrodt in self-defense, saying that Mackrodt had threatened him previously and had shot at him on a previous occasion. Latimer also claimed that he did not shoot at Mackrodt until he put his hand into his pocket. Mackrodt had been carrying a pocketknife. Among the character witnesses called by the defense was Bob Ewing, a former teammate of Latimer's who was serving as sheriff of Auglaize County.

The jury convicted Latimer of second-degree murder on December 31, 1924, and was sentenced to life in prison at the Ohio State Penitentiary on January 5, 1925. He decided not to appeal the verdict. During his incarceration, Latimer was considered a model prisoner. He was made a trusty and managed the prison's baseball team.

=== Pardon ===
On November 8, 1926, a gang of 13 prisoners attacked the guards as they attempted to break out of the Ohio State Penitentiary. Latimer and other trusties assisted the guards with capturing the escaped prisoners. On April 21, 1930, a fire broke out that killed 322 prisoners. During the ensuing chaos, Latimer was given a shotgun and he stood guard overnight.

By May 1929, friends of Latimer began petitioning Governor Myers Y. Cooper to pardon Latimer. Cooper issued a pardon for Latimer on December 24, 1930.

== Later life ==
Following his release, Latimer was hired as a night detective in a Cincinnati hotel. He then worked for the Container Corporation of America.

Latimer's first wife, Lottie, filed for divorce in 1926, after 27 years of marriage. They had three children together. He married Mildred Elizabeth Shawan on December 30, 1931, and they had a daughter in 1933.

Latimer died of a heart attack at his home in Loveland on April 24, 1936.

== See also ==
- List of professional sportspeople convicted of crimes
