= Hampton-Newport News Clamdiggers =

- 1896; Hampton, Virginia

Minor league affiliations
- Class: Class B (1896)
- League: Virginia League I (1896)

Major league affiliations
- Team: None

Minor league titles
- League titles (0): None

Team data
- Name: Hampton-Newport News Clamdiggers (1896)
- Ballpark: Lincoln Park (1896)

The Hampton-Newport News Clamdiggers were a minor league baseball team based in Hampton, Virginia in partnership neighboring Newport News, Virginia. In 1896, the Petersburg Farmers of the Class B level Virginia League I relocated to Hampton during the season, where the team ended the season in fourth place. The Clamdiggers hosted home minor league games at Lincoln Park in Hampton.

== History ==
Minor league baseball began in Hampton in 1894, when the Newport News-Hampton Deck Hands joined the Virginia League during the season, placing fourth. The team did not return to league play in 1895.

In 1896, the Virginia League began play as a six-team league on April 16, 1896, with the Lynchburg Tobacconists, Norfolk Braves, Petersburg Farmers, Portsmouth Browns, Richmond Bluebirds and Roanoke Magicians as league members to begin the season.

On August 13, 1896, the Petersburg Farmers moved to Hampton, Virginia with a 32–60 record to become the "Hampton-Newport News Clamdiggers" for the remainder of the season. Some sources refer to the team as the shortened "Hampton Clamdiggers."

The "Clamdiggers" nickname corresponds with the history of the seafood industry in the Hampton region. With its location on Chesapeake Bay, the seafood available locally has been a major industry in Hamtpton, beginning after the conclusion of the Civil War.

On August 20, 1896, Roanoke disbanded from the Virginia League, with Lynchburg disbanding two days later on August 20. This left the league with four remaining teams.

The Clamdiggers finished the remainder of the season schedule in last place. After a 7–30 record while based in Hampton, the team ended the season with an overall record of 39–90 record, playing the season under managers Jimmie Breen, George Kelly and Charles Boyer. The Clamdiggers ended the season 48.0 games behind first place Richmond.

The Virginia League folded after the 1896 season. Hampton next hosted the 1900 Hampton Crabs, who played as members of the six–team, Class D level Virginia League, joined in league play by the Newport based Newport News Shipbuilders.

== The ballpark ==
The Hampton-Newport News Clamdiggers hosted 1896 home games at Lincoln Park.

In the era, the 1895 and 1896 Philadelphia Phillies held spring training at the National Home for Disabled Volunteer Soldiers in Hampton. The Phillies utilized the Hampton Soldiers' Home athletic grounds, which were located 300 yards from the team hotel on the property.

== Timeline ==
Year(s)	# Yrs.	Team	Level	League	Ballparks
1894	1	Newport News-Hampton Deck Hands	Class B	Virginia League I	Lincoln Park
1896	1	Hampton-Newport News Clamdiggers	Class B	Virginia League I	Lincoln Park

== Year–by–year record ==
Year	Record	Finish	Manager	Playoffs/Notes
1896	39–90	4th	Jimmie Breen / George Kelly; Charles Boyer	Petersburg (32–60) moved to Hampton August 13

== Notable alumni ==
- Davey Crockett (1896)
- Gus Dundon (1896)
- Tom Fleming (1896)
- Bill Hallman (1896)
- Frank Kitson (1896)
- Tommy Leach (1896)
- Gene McCann (1896)
- Frank Morrissey (1896)
- Doc Powers (1896)
- Bill Quarles (1896)
- Bobby Rothermel (1896)
- Ike Samuels (1896)
- Crazy Schmit (1896)
- Reuben Stephenson (1896)
- Otis Stocksdale (1896)
- Pete Woodruff (1896)

== See also ==
- Petersburg Farmers players
- Hampton Clamdiggers players
