= Richmond Bluebirds =

- 1895–1901; Richmond, Virginia

Minor league affiliations
- Class: Class B (1895–1899); Class D (1900); Class C (1901)
- League: Virginia League (1895–1896); Atlantic League (1897–1899); Virginia League (1900); Virginia-North Carolina League (1901)

Major league affiliations
- Team: None

Minor league titles
- League titles (4): 1895; 1896; 1898; 1899

Team data
- Name: Richmond Bluebirds (1895–1901)
- Ballpark: Richmond Fairgrounds (1895–1897); Mayo Island Park (1895–1899); Broad Street Park (1897–1901)

The Richmond Bluebirds were a minor league baseball team based in Richmond, Virginia. Between 1895 and 1901, the Bluebirds played as members of the Virginia League in 1895 and 1896, Atlantic League from 1897 to 1899, Virginia League in 1900 and Virginia-North Carolina League in 1901. The Bluebirds won league championships in 1895, 1896, 1898 and 1899, all while playing under manager Jake Wells.

Baseball Hall of Fame member Jack Chesbro played for the Richmond Blue Birds from 1897 to 1899.

The Bluebirds were succeeded by the 1906 Richmond Colts, who began play in the Virginia League. Today, the Richmond Flying Squirrels play as members of the Double-A Northeast League.

The team was also occasionally nicknamed the "Cherubs" by papers in their time.

== History ==
The minor league Richmond Bluebirds team was preceded by the Richmond Virginians and Richmond Colts teams. The Richmond Virginians last played as members of the 1884 Virginia League. The Colts immediately preceded the Bluebirds, when the team played as members of the 1894 Virginia League.

The 1895 Richmond Bluebirds won the championship in their first season of play. The Bluebirds began play as members of the six–team Class B level "Virginia State League," formally called the Virginia League. The Bluebirds ended the 1895 season with a record of 78–45 to place first in the league standings, finishing 9.0 games ahead of the second place Lynchburg Tobacconists. Jake Wells served as manager and would continue as the Bluebird manager through the 1899 season. Carney Flynn of Richmond led the league with 23 wins and 203 strikeouts.

The Richmond Bluebirds repeated as Virginia League champions in 1896. The Bluebirds ended the 1896 season with a final record of 71–55, placing first and finishing 3.0 games ahead on the second place Norfolk Braves in the final standings of the six–team league. Jake Wells again served as manager.

The 1897 Richmond Bluebirds continued play as members of the eight–team Class B level Atlantic League. The Richmond Bluebirds of the Atlantic League ended the 1897 season with a record of 71–59, placing fourth and finishing 16.5 games behind the first place Lancaster Maroons. The 1897 Richmond team was also referenced under the "Giants" moniker. Jake Wells again served as manager. Baseball Hall of Fame member Jack Chesbro pitched for the 1897 Richmond team, his first of three seasons with the club, compiling a 16–18 record with a 1.80 ERA in 289 innings at age 23.

The Richmond Bluebirds won the 1898 Atlantic League championship. The Bluebirds ended the 1898 season with a record of 77–44, placing first in the final standings, finishing just 0.5 game ahead of the 2nd place Lancaster Maroons. Jake Wells continued as Richmond's manager. Bluebird player Socks Seybold led the league with 17 home runs. Jack Chesbro again played for Richmond, with his 1898 individual statistics unknown.

The 1899 Richmond Bluebirds defended their Atlantic League title and won their fourth league championship. Richmond ended the 1899 season with a record of 63–25, placing first in the final standings, as Jake Wells continued as manager. Richmond finished the season 13.0 games ahead of the second place Wilkes-Barre Coal Barons. Richmond pitcher Jack Chesbro compiled a 17–4 record with a 2.91 ERA with the Bluebirds before making his major league debut with the 1899 Pittsburgh Pirates. On July 7, 1899, Chesbro's contract was sold by Richmond to the Pittsburgh Pirates for $1,500. Richmond did not return to Atlantic League play following the 1899 season.

In 1900, the Richmond Bluebirds became members of the six–team, Class D level Virginia League but disbanded during the season. The Virginia league resumed play with the Norfolk Mary Janes, Portsmouth Pirates, Newport News Shipbuilders and as well as teams in Hopewell and Petersburg joining Richmond in beginning league play.

On June 13, 1900, the Richmond franchise folded with a record of 21–15. Charles Boyer and Harry Berte served as managers. Petersburg also disbanded during the season. Following the 1900 season, the league became the Virginia-North Carolina League.

Despite folding the season before, Richmond Bluebirds reformed for the 1901 season. Richmond became members of the Class C level Virginia-North Carolina League, before again folding during the season. The Bluebirds ended the 1901 season with a record of 27–35, when both Norfolk and Richmond were noted to have disbanded in "early July". The league continued play until disbanding on August 17, 1901. Charles Kain served as the Richmond manager. The team was also referred to as the "Grays" in some references.

Richmond, Virginia was without a minor league team until the 1906 Richmond Colts began play as members of the Virginia League. Today, the Richmond Flying Squirrels continue minor league play in Richmond play as members of the Double-A Northeast League.

== The ballparks ==
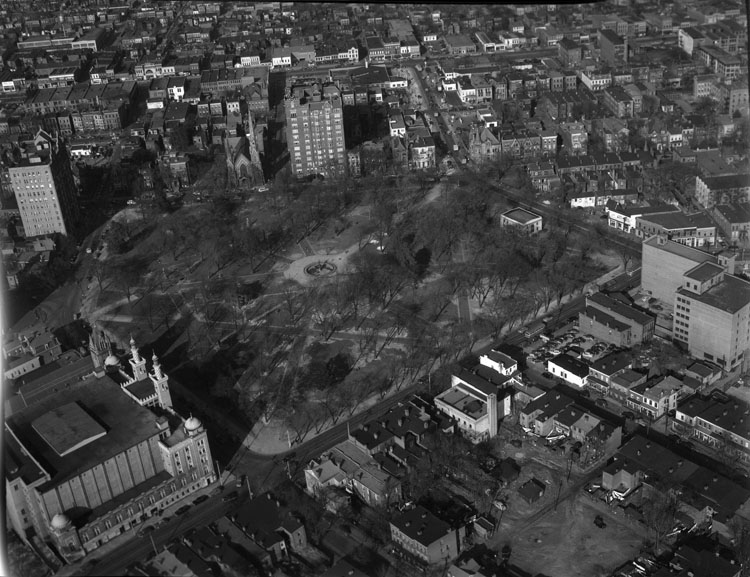
(1951) Monroe Park

From 1895 to 1897, the Richmond Bluebirds hosted home games at the Richmond Fairgrounds. The fairgrounds were located at North Belvedere Street (US 301 & US 1) between West Main Street & West Franklin Street. Today, the site is known as Monroe Park. The site was established in 1851 as a public park, and today, the Monroe Park remains as the oldest park in Richmond. Adjacent to the campus of Virginia Commonwealth University, the park is located at 620 West Main Street.

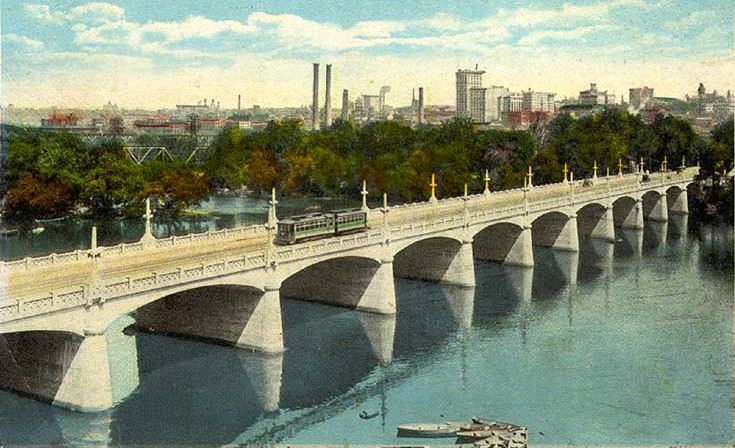
(1917) Mayo Bridge/14th Street Bridge, Richmond, VA

In the seasons between 1895 and 1899, Richmond tams were noted to have also played some minor league home games at Mayo Island Park. Overall, Richmond minor league teams played at the ballpark between 1894 and 1932. The ballpark was located on Mayo Island, which lies within the James River on the east side of the Mayo Bridge, also called the 14th Street Bridge.

Beginning in 1897, Richmond teams were noted to have played minor league games at Broad Street Park, which was built for the Richmond Bluebirds. The ballpark had a seating capacity over 6,000. Home plate was located 80 feet from the grandstand. The field dimensions were 295 feet down the left field foul line and 340 feet down the right field foul line, with the fences extending to a distance of 560 feet from home plate in right-center field. The stadium was located on Broad Street near its dead-end intersection with Allen Avenue on land leased from the Richmond, Fredericksburg and Potomac Railroad. It overlooked the railyard to the north. The first game played at Broad Street Park was on April 3, 1897, when the Richmond Bluebirds beat Richmond College by a score of 11 to 3.

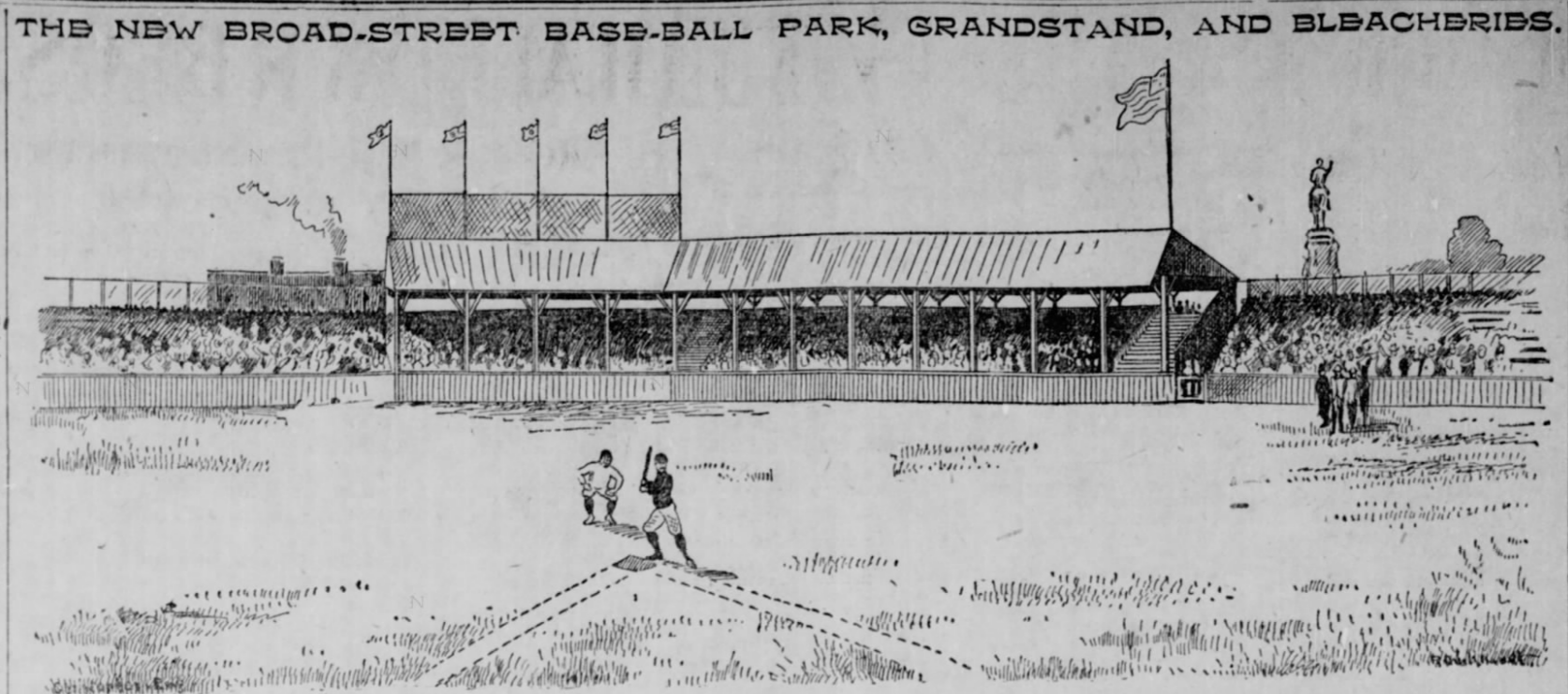
An illustration of Broad Street Park published in The Richmond Dispatch, 1897

== Timeline ==
| Year(s) | # Yrs. | Team | Level | League | Ballpark |
|---|---|---|---|---|---|
| 1895–1896 | 2 | Richmond Bluebirds | Class B | Virginia League | Richmond Fairgrounds; Mayo Island Park |
| 1897–1899 | 3 | Richmond Bluebirds | Class B | Atlantic League | Broad Street Park |
| 1900 | 1 | Richmond Bluebirds | Class D | Virginia League | Broad Street Park |
| 1901 | 1 | Richmond Bluebirds | Class C | Virginia-North Carolina League | Broad Street Park |

== Year–by–year records ==
| Year | Record | Finish | Manager | Playoffs/Notes |
|---|---|---|---|---|
| 1895 | 78–45 | 1st | Jake Wells | League champions |
| 1896 | 71–55 | 1st | Jake Wells | League champions |
| 1897 | 71–59 | 4th | Jake Wells | No playoffs held |
| 1898 | 77–44 | 1st | Jake Wells | League champions |
| 1899 | 63–25 | 1st | Jake Wells | League champions |
| 1900 | 21–15 | NA | Charles Boyer / Harry Berte | Team folded June 13 |
| 1901 | 27–35 | NA | Barley Kain | Team folded in July |

== Notable alumni ==
- Jack Chesbro (1897–1898) Inducted Baseball Hall of Fame, 1946
- King Bailey (1895–1896)
- Harry Berte (1896; 1900, MGR)
- Rome Chambers (1897)
- Fritz Clausen (1896)
- Jim Cockman (1897)
- Harry Colliflower (1901)
- Joe Dolan (1899)
- Bill Donovan (1899)
- Jake Drauby (1900–1901)
- Gus Dundon (1898–1899)
- Kid Elberfeld (1897)
- Patsy Flaherty (1899)
- Carney Flynn (1895, 1897)
- Reddy Foster (1895–1897, 1900)
- George Gillpatrick (1896)
- Bill Goodenough (1897)
- Tom Hess (1898–1899)
- Buck Hooker (1900–1901)
- John Houseman (1895)
- Dan Leahy (1898)
- Sam Leever (1897–1898)
- Luke Lutenberg (1898)
- John Malarkey (1896)
- Lefty Marr (1896-1897)
- Robert Pender (1894, 1896)
- John Roach (1900)
- Harry Schmidt (1897–1898)
- Socks Seybold (1898–1899)
- Spike Shannon (1898–1899)
- Ollie Smith (1895)
- Tully Sparks (1894, 1896)
- Farmer Steelman (1897, 1899)
- Archie Stimmel (1898)
- Otis Stocksdale (1896–1898)
- Tom Stouch (1900)
- Bill Stuart (1897)
- Jesse Tannehill (1895–1896, 1900) 1902 AL ERA title
- John Thornton (1897)
- George Ulrich (1897)
- Jake Wells (1895–1899, MGR)
- Tug Wilson (1896)
- Pete Woodruff (1896)
- Zeke Wrigley (1899)
- Richmond Bluebirds players
