= Virginia League (1894–1896) =

Defunct American baseball league

- Classification: Independent (1894); Class B (1895–1896)
- Sport: Minor League Baseball
- First season: 1894
- Folded: 1896
- Replaced by: Virginia League (1900)
- President: Camden Sommers (1894); Judge Samuel B. Witt, Jr. (1895); James McLaughlin (1896)
- No. of teams: 8
- Country: United States
- Most titles: 2 Richmond Bluebirds (1895–1896)

The Virginia League (1894–1896) was a minor league baseball organization active in central Virginia.

== History ==
In 1894, the Virginia League began play as an Independent level league and fielded six teams: the Lynchburg, Virginia based Lynchburg Hill Climbers, the Norfolk, Virginia based Norfolk Clam Eaters, the Petersburg Farmers, the Richmond Bluebirds, the Roanoke, Virginia based Roanoke Magicians, and the Staunton, Virginia based Staunton Hayseeds / Newport News, Virginia-Hampton, Virginia based Newport News-Hampton Deck Hands (the Staunton team relocated in the middle of the 1894 season).

In 1895, the league was upgraded to a Class B level league. The teams during the 1895 season were the Lynchburg Hill Climbers, the Norfolk Clams/Crows, the Petersburg Farmers, the Portsmouth Truckers, the Richmond Blue Birds, and the Roanoke Magicians.

In 1896, the Norfolk team became the Norfolk Braves, the Portsmouth team became the Portsmouth Browns and then moved to Hampton and became the Hampton-Newport News Clamdiggers.

== 1894–1896 cities represented ==
- Lynchburg, VA: Lynchburg Hill Climbers 1894; Lynchburg Tobacconists 1895–1896
- Newport News, VA & Hampton, VA: Newport News-Hampton Deck Hands 1894; Hampton-Newport News Clamdiggers 1896
- Norfolk, VA: Norfolk Clam Eaters 1894; Norfolk Clams/Norfolk Crows 1895; Norfolk Braves 1896
- Petersburg, VA: Petersburg Farmers 1894–1896
- Portsmouth, VA: Portsmouth Truckers 1895; Portsmouth Browns 1896
- Richmond, VA: Richmond Crows/Richmond Colts 1894; Richmond Bluebirds 1895-1896
- Roanoke, VA: Roanoke Magicians 1894–1896
- Staunton, VA: Staunton Hayseeds 1894

== 1894–1896 standings and statistics ==
1894 Virginia State League

Team standings	W	L	PCT	GB	Managers
Petersburg Farmers	72	44	.621	-	H.P. Harrison
Norfolk Clam Eaters	66	45	.595	3.5	Camden Sommers
Richmond Crows / Richmond Colts	67	48	.583	4.5	Timothy West
Staunton Hayseeds / Newport News-Hampton Deck Hands	50	64	.439	21.0	Pat Ziegler; C.A. Gaussen / William Donovan
Roanoke Magicians	45	71	.338	27.0	George Houston / Hal O'Hagan / Shadrack McHooveter / Bill Stephenson
Lynchburg Hill Climbers	43	71	.377	28.0	E.J. Kerry / Samuel Shaw; J. Hofford / S. Moran

Staunton (36-53) moved to Newport News-Hampton August 14.

Player statistics
Player	Team	Stat	Tot
Stuart Sanford	Petersburg	Hits	121

1895 Virginia State League

Team standings	W	L	PCT	GB	Managers
Richmond Bluebirds	78	45	.634	-	Jake Wells
Lynchburg Tobacconists	67	52	.563	9.0	Bill Smith
Norfolk Clams/Crows	56	61	.479	19.0	Camden Sommers; Bill Hoggins / Pop Tate
Portsmouth Truckers	57	68	.456	22.0	John Brady; Charles Bland / George Reed
Petersburg Farmers	55	69	.444	23.5	Bob Pender
Roanoke Magicians	52	70	.431	25.5	Jim Breen / Dick Padden

No Playoffs Scheduled.

Player statistics
Player	Team	Stat	Tot	Player	Team	Stat	Tot
Pop Tate	Portsmouth/Norfolk	BA	.412	Carney Flynn	Richmond	W	25
Hal O'Hagan	Norfolk	Runs	125	Carney Flynn	Richmond	SO	203
Pop Tate	Portsmouth/Norfolk	Hits	194	Al Orth	Lynchburg	PCT	.774 24-7
Bob Berryhill	Lynchburg	HR	19				
Charles McIntyre	Lynchburg	HR	19				
Louis Lippert	Petersburg	SB	77				

1896 Virginia State League

Team standings	W	L	PCT	GB	Managers
Richmond Bluebirds	71	55	.563	-	Jake Wells
Norfolk Braves	70	60	.538	3.0	Claude McFarland
Portsmouth Browns	65	64	.504	7.5	Lefty Marr / Bill Hall
Petersburg Farmers / Hampton-Newport News Clamdiggers	39	90	.302	33.5	James Breen; George Kelly / Charles Boyer
Lynchburg Tobacconists	68	37	.648	NA	Bill Smith
Roanoke Magicians	49	56	.467	NA	Charles Boyer / Pop Tate

Petersburg (32–60) moved to Hampton August 13.
Roanoke disbanded August 20; Lynchburg disbanded August 22.
The league played a three part split season.

Player statistics
Player	Team	Stat	Tot	Player	Team	Stat	Tot
Pop Tate	Roanoke	BA	.384	Jesse Tannehill	Richmond	W	27
Claude McFarland	Norfolk	Runs	123	Cy Malarkey	Richmond	SO	208
Claude McFarland	Norfolk	Hits	194	W.F. McFarland	Lynchburg	PCT	.741 20-7
Zeke Wrigley	Roanoke	HR	16				
Joe Dolan	Lynchburg	HR	16				
Dummy Stephenson	Norfolk/Portsmouth/Petersburg	HR	16				
Barley Kain	Richmond	SB	94				
