= Broad Street Park =

Broad Street Park can refer to:

- Broad Street Park (Richmond, Virginia), a stadium located in Richmond, Virginia that stood from 1897 to 1916
- A town square in Claremont, New Hampshire
- A park in Greenwood, Mississippi
- A neighborhood in Hamilton Township, Mercer County, New Jersey
