= Middletown State Hospital =

Defunct psychiatric hospital

Middletown State Homeopathic Hospital
- State of New York
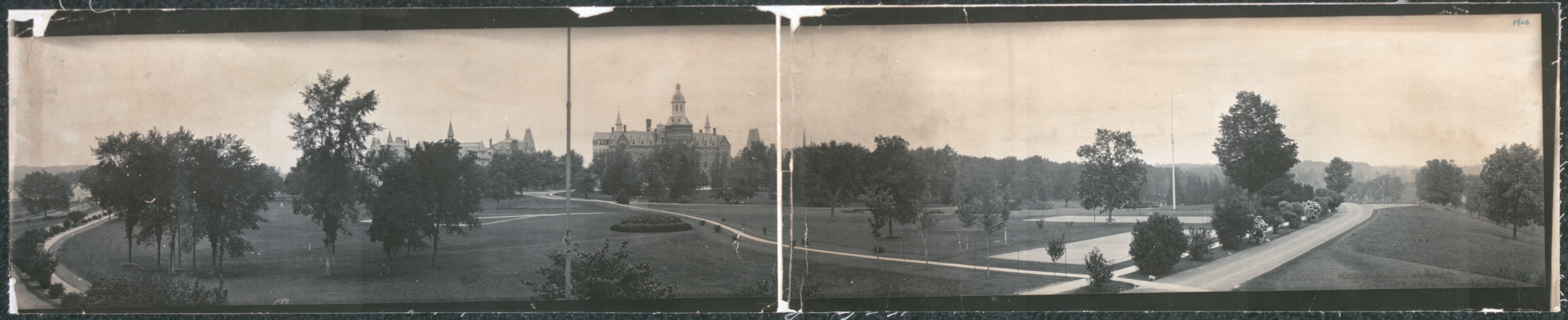
- Panoramic photo

Geography
- Location: Middletown, Orange County, New York, United States
- Coordinates: 41.45°N 74.44°W

Organization
- Type: Homeopathic mental health facility

History
- Founded: April 20, 1874
- Closed: 2006

Links
- Lists: Hospitals in New York State

Middletown State Homeopathic Hospital (also known as Middletown State Hospital or Middletown Psychiatric Center) was a hospital for the treatment of mental disorders located in Middletown, New York. It opened on April 20, 1874, and was the first purely homeopathic hospital for mental disorders in the United States. The hospital, which served "mentally ill patients from Orange, Sullivan and Ulster Counties". employed a number of new techniques for the treatment of mental disorders, most notably the use of baseball as a therapy.

It closed in 2006.

== History ==
=== 1866-1910 ===
The push for a state homeopathic institution for the treatment of mental disorders began in 1866 when John Stanton Gould delivered a speech to the State Homeopathic Medical Society entitled The Relation of Insanity to Bodily Disease. In this speech, Gould asserted that "It has been my purpose in this address, gentlemen, to bring before you in a clear and specific form the proofs that insanity is always a symptom of bodily disease which it is your duty and ought to be your pleasure to cure." At the next meeting of the State Homeopathic Medical Society, they passed a resolution to push the New York State Legislature to construct an institution for the treatment of mental disorders along homeopathic lines. The state legislature approved a bill for the establishment of a state hospital in Middletown to use homeopathic therapy methods on April 28, 1870.

The hospital, which opened in 1874 with 69 patients. Henry Reed Stiles became the second superintendent of the hospital in 1875 and introduced strict dietary regimens. From 1877 until 1902, Dr. Seldon H. Talcott was the superintendent and developed a series of occupational therapy for all patients at Middletown. His treatment included art exhibitions, an institutional newsletter written by the patients (The Conglomerate), and athletics.

In 1901, Ralph Albert Blakelock became a patient at the hospital where he continued painting his landscapes.

=== Subsequently ===
The facility, located in Orange County, was previously known as Middletown State Hospital for the Insane. The number of buildings and the number of patients grew reaching over 100 buildings and 2,250 people in the early 1900s and 3,686 in the 1960s.

In 1970 they had 3,000 patients. Services shifted primarily to outpatient therapy and numbers decreased. The institution permanently closed in 2006.

== Baseball therapy ==
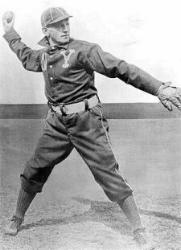
Chesbro pitching for the New York Highlanders started his career playing for the Middletown Asylums

While superintendent of the hospital, Seldon H. Talcott began using a range of physical activity as treatment for mental disorders. In 1888, they founded a team composed of patients, staff, and some of the best amateur baseball players in the region. The team began play in 1889 as the Asylums playing other teams in the region. By 1890, the team was playing regional teams from New York City and elsewhere winning 21 games out of 25. This included a split with the Cuban Giants, one of the top baseball teams at the time. In 1891, they narrowly lost a game against the New York Giants, which had finished third in the National League that year, 4-3. In 1892, the team went undefeated except for two narrow losses to the New York Giants, defeating the Cuban Giants, the New York Gothams, and many other teams from New York and New Jersey. Over the next few years, a number of excellent semipro players played for the Asylums. Many were recruited directly from the Asylums to professional baseball. With increased caseloads in the 1890s, the baseball focus of the Middletown hospital decreased and the Asylums withered away.

== Notable players ==
- Alfred Lawson
- George "Tuck" Turner, played later for the Philadelphia Phillies
- Jack Chesbro
- Art Madison
