= Paterson Silk Weavers =

- 1896–1898; (1896-1899); Paterson, New Jersey

Minor league affiliations
- Class: Class A (1896); Class B (1897–1898)); Class A (1899)
- League: Atlantic League (1896–1899)

Major league affiliations
- Team: None

Minor league titles
- League titles (1): 1896

Team data
- Name: Paterson Silk Weavers (1896–1898); Paterson Giants (1899)
- Ballpark: East Side Park*

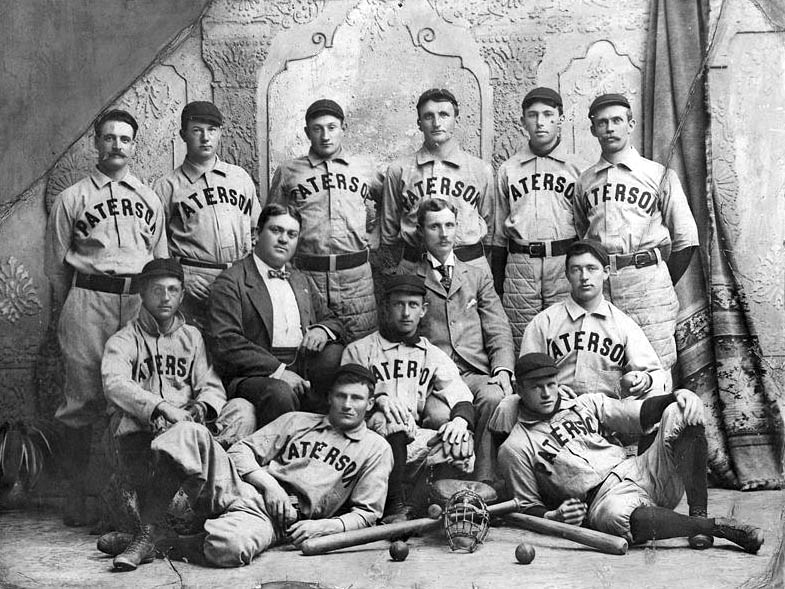
The 1897 Paterson Silk Weavers. Honus Wagner is third from left in the back row. Ed Barrow is in the dark dress suit.

The Paterson Silk Weavers were a minor league baseball team based in Paterson, New Jersey. From 1896 to 1899, Paterson played exclusively as members of the Atlantic League, winning the 1896 league championship amidst controversy. Baseball Hall of Fame charter member Honus Wagner played for the 1896 and 1897 Paterson Silk Weavers, before making his major league debut in 1897. Fellow Hall of Fame member Ed Barrow was Wagner's manager in 1896, after scouting him and signing him to the team. Barrow managed the Paterson team again in 1899.

== History ==
In 1896, the Paterson "Silk Weavers" became charter members of the eight–team Class A level Atlantic League, the highest level of minor leagues at the time. The Hartford Bluebirds, Lancaster Maroons, New Haven Texas Steers, Philadelphia Athletics, New York Metropolitans, Newark Colts and Wilmington Peaches joined Newark in beginning league play on April 23, 1896.

The "Silk Weavers" nickname corresponds to the silk weaving industry in Paterson in the era. Paterson was known as "Silk City."

Baseball Hall of Fame member Ed Barrow was the owner and manager of the 1896 Silk Weavers. Barrow first met Baseball Hall of Fame charter member Honus Wagner, in 1895, as Wagner was throwing lumps of coal at a railroad station in Pennsylvania. Barrow signed Wagner to his first professional contract and then signed Wagner again to play for him in Paterson in 1896. In 1897, Wagner's talents were obvious and the Louisville Colonels of the National League (NL) purchased Wagner from Paterson for $2,100 ($81,270 in current dollar terms).

The Paterson Silk Weavers placed third in the 1896 Atlantic League regular season in their first season of play. A controversial playoff ensued. Playing under manager Ed Barrow, the Silk Weavers ended the 1896 season with a final record of 74–60, finishing 3.5 games ahead of the pennant winning Newark Colts in the final standings of the seven–team league. The Wilmington Peaches (58–79), New York Metropolitans/Philadelphia Athletics (57–69), Lancaster Maroons (26–30) and New Haven Texas Steers (21–38) followed Paterson in the final standings. Lancaster and New Haven folded before the end of the season, leaving five teams to complete the 1896 season.

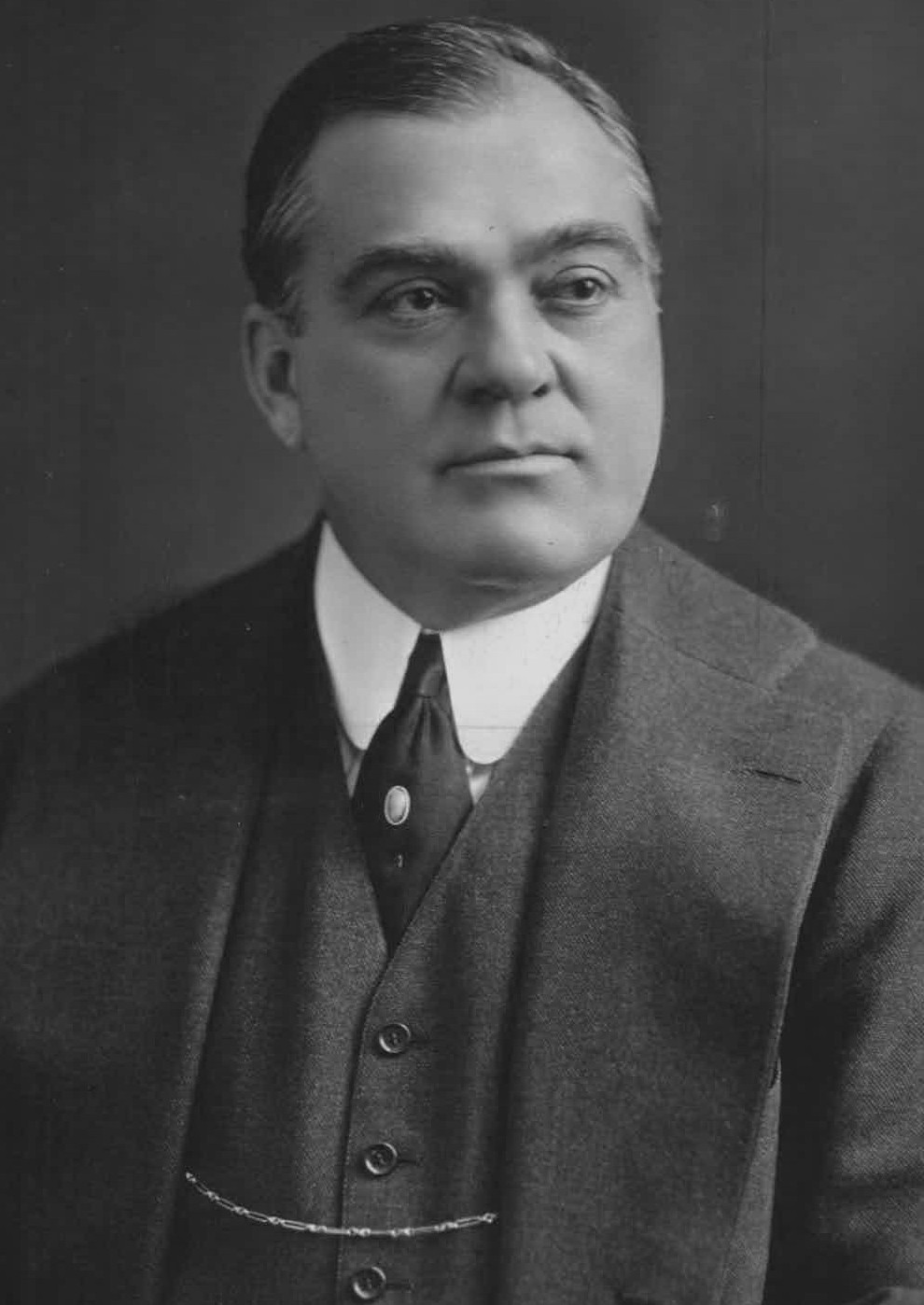
Baseball Hall of Fame member Ed Barrow managed the Paterson teams in 1896 and 1899 and was president of the Atlantic League for three of its five seasons.

After the 1896 season, Hartford challenged Newark's final record, contesting that their record was unfairly inflated due to a dozen extra games played. It was argued that Newark also used suspended pitcher Joseph Frye, who had left Hartford during the season. As a result, the second place Hartford Bluebirds challenged Newark to a seven–game series to decide the championship. Newark declined the invitation and remained champions as decided by the league. The third place Paterson Silk Weavers then accepted the Hartford invitation to play a series. Paterson prevailed over Hartford five games to two in what was called the "Soby Cup."

The Soby Cup, is an actual cup, made of silver, that was given to the Atlantic League by tobacco businessman Charles Soby of Hartford, Connecticut, in September 1896. In its first season, the cup was to be awarded to the winner of a postseason series between the league's top two teams; in subsequent years, the holder of the cup would play a series against the league's top finishing team. Today, the physical cup resides in the Baseball Hall of Fame.

Baseball Hall of Fame charter member Honus Wagner played for Paterson in 1896, at age 22, hitting.313 in 109 games with 6 home runs and 48 RBI. Wagner was in his second season of professional baseball. Manager Ed Barrow had seen Wagner play in 1895 and signed him to play for Paterson in 1896.

Paterson Pitcher Sam McMackin had a strong season in 1896, ending with a record of 25–16 and a 2.83 ERA in 384.1 innings pitched. This despite being suspended for several games for pitching while drunk. McMackin lead the team in wins and innings pitched. After the season, the Sporting Life wrote that: "No two men (McMackin and teammate Jack Kellackey) worked harder for the success of the local team during the past season than did these two, and the people here appreciate it. McMackin has been made night timekeeper in one of the large iron factories here, and has already started in."

The 1897 Paterson Silk Weavers continued play as members of the eight–team Class B level Atlantic League. Managed by Jim Gilman and Heinie Smith, Paterson ended the 1897 season with a record of 68–79, placing sixth and finishing 28.0 games behind the first place Lancaster Maroons.

Honus Wagner began the 1897 season playing for Paterson, before making his major league debut at the end of the season. On May 5, 1897, Wagner led Paterson to victory over Lancaster with an RBI triple, driving in two runs early in the game, before winning the game with a three-run home run. Wagner was hitting .379 when he joined the Louisville Colonels of the National League, making his major league debut on July 19, 1897. Ed Barrow had contacted Louisville president Barney Dreyfuss, secretary Harry Pulliam, and player-manager Fred Clarke to travel to Paterson to see Wagner play.

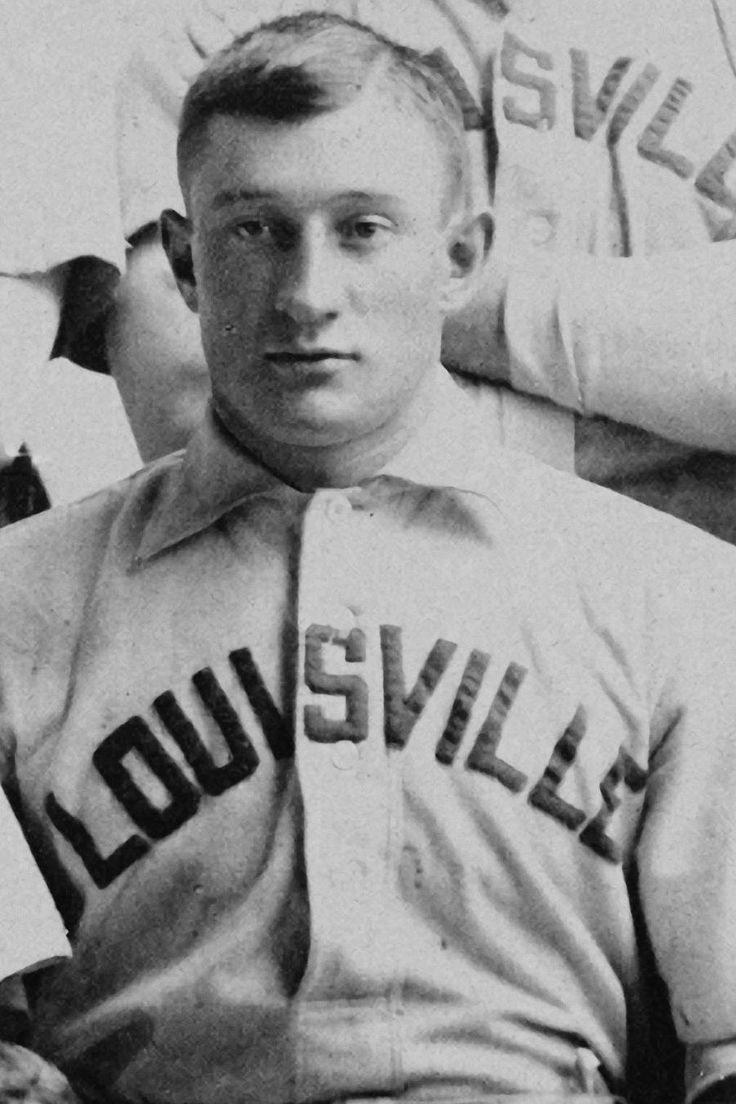
(1897) Baseball Hall of Fame charter member Honus Wagner played for Paterson in 1896 and 1897.

Following the 1897 season, the Soby Cup series should have been contested between Lancaster, that year's top team, and Paterson, who had won the cup in 1896. However, league officials decided to have the top two teams of 1897—Lancaster and Newark—play for the cup. After Lancaster and Newark could not agree to terms for a series, the Soby Cup was awarded to Lancaster, the pennant winner.

Prior to the 1898 season, the Atlantic League discontinued the postseason Soby Cup format, and returned the physical cup to Charles Soby. By 1951, the cup was at the Baseball Hall of Fame, where it remains as of 2019.

The Paterson Silk Weavers or "Weavers" placed fourth in the 1898 Atlantic League. Paterson ended the 1898 season with a record of 58–71, as Sam LaRocque served as manager. Newark finished 19.0 games behind the first place Richmond Bluebirds in final standings of the eight–team league.

In their final season of play, the 1899 Paterson team continued play as the Atlantic League was elevated to a Class A level league. The team switched nicknames to become the Paterson "Giants." The Giants folded before the end of the season. On July 9, 1899, Paterson folded and ended the 1899 season with a record of 21–51. Rasty Wright, John Thornton, Ed Barrow and Abner Powell managed the Giants during the season, as Paterson finished 25.0 games behind the champion place Richmond Blue Birds in the final Atlantic League standings.

After the Paterson Giants folded, the city was without a minor league team until the 1904 Paterson Intruders began play as members of the Hudson River League.

The Atlantic League resumed play for the 1914 season, with the Paterson "Silk Citys" as a member as the league folded following the season.

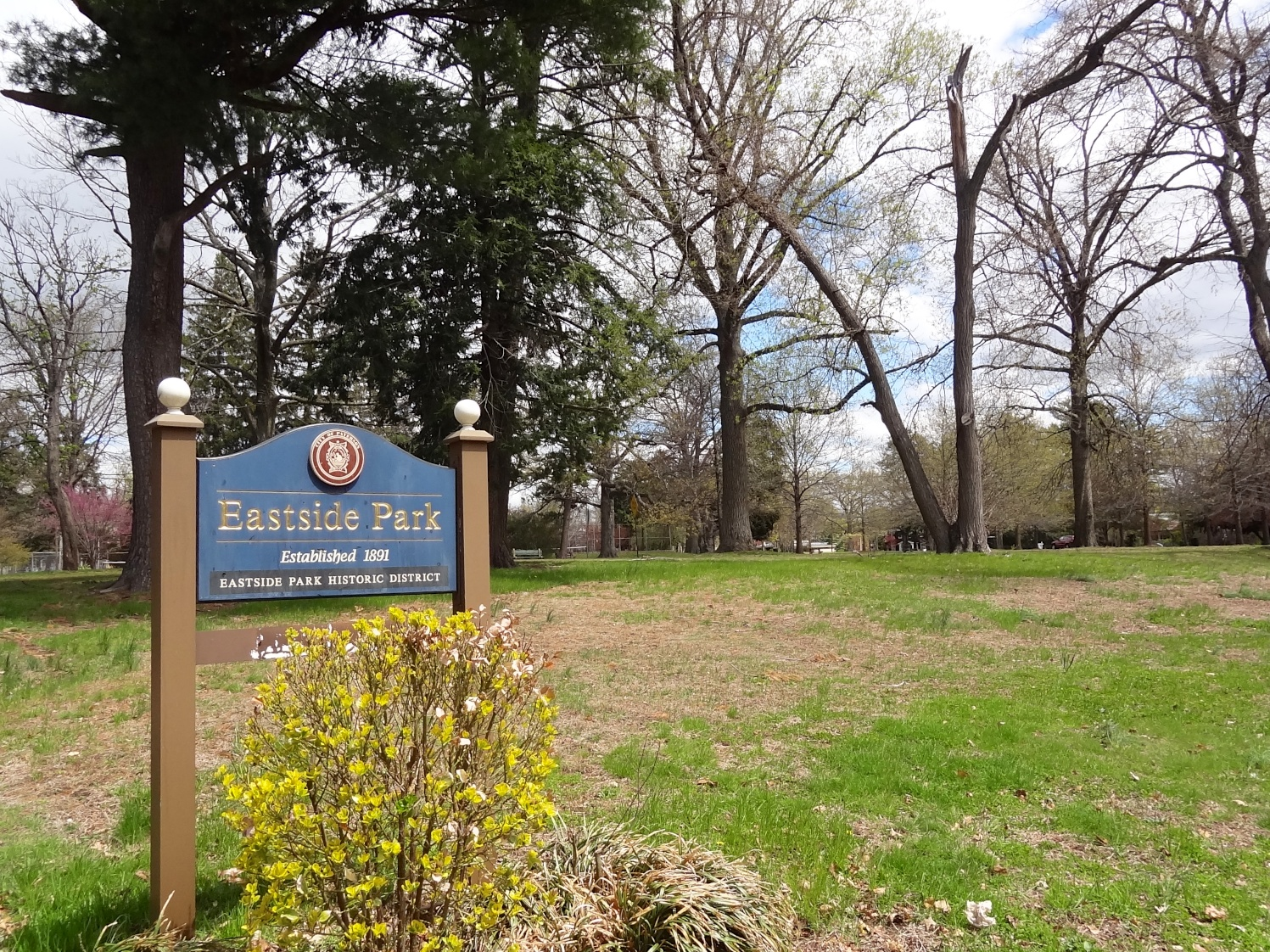
(2014) Eastside Park Entrance sign, Paterson, NJ

== The ballpark ==
The name of the Paterson home ballpark in Atlantic League play is not directly referenced.East Side Park was in use in the era, hosting baseball, after first becoming a public park in the 1880s. Still in use today as a public park, and hosting baseball at Larry Doby Field within the park, East Side Park is located on Martin Luther King, Jr. Way (Broadway) to the north, McLean Boulevard (State Route 20) to the east, Park Avenue to the south, and Derrom Avenue to the west.

== Timeline ==
Year(s)	# Yrs.	Team	Level	League
1896	1	Paterson Silk Weavers	Class A	Atlantic League
1897–1998	2	Paterson Silk Weavers	Class B	Atlantic League
1899	1	Paterson Giants	Class A	Atlantic League

== Year-by–year records ==
Year	Record	Finish	Manager	Playoffs/Notes
1896	74–60	3rd	Ed Barrow	Won "Soby Cup"; League champions
1897	68–79	6th	Jim Gilman / Heinie Smith	Did not qualify for "Soby Cup" playoff
1898	65–70	4th	Sam LaRocque	No playoffs held
1899	21–51	NA	Rasty Wright / John Thornton; Ed Barrow / Abner Powell	Team folded July 9

== Notable alumni ==
- Ed Barrow (1896, 1899, MGR) Inducted Baseball Hall of Fame, 1953
- Honus Wagner (1896-1897) Inducted Baseball Hall of Fame, 1936
- Bill Armour (1896)
- Charlie Bastian (1896)
- Larry Battam (1896)
- Harry Bemis (1898)
- George Briston (1896)
- Bill Byers (1899)
- Lew Camp (1899)
- Wid Conroy (1897)
- Dick Cogan (1896)
- Joe Delahanty (1898)
- Jim Duncan (1899)
- Patsy Flaherty (1897-1898)
- Shorty Gallagher (1897)
- Jim Gilman (1897, MGR)
- John Gochnaur (1899)
- Irv Hach (1897)
- Charlie Hamburg (1897)
- Scott Hardesty (1896-1898)
- Emmet Heidrick (1896, 1898)
- Mike Jacobs (1898)
- Abbie Johnson (1897-1898)
- Alex Jones (1897-1898)
- Bill Keister (1897)
- Hi Ladd (1899)
- Sam LaRocque (1898, MGR)
- Jim Long (1899)
- Dick Marsh (1899)
- Gus McGinnis (1898)
- Sam McMackin (1896)
- Dan Minnehan (1898)
- Kid Nance (1898)
- John Newell (1897)
- Ed Pabst (1899)
- Bill Pounds (1899)
- Abner Powell (1899, 1899)
- Heinie Smith (1897, MGR)
- John Stafford (1896)
- Tom Stouch (1896)
- Billy Taylor (1896)
- John Thornton (1899, MGR)
- George Ulrich (1896)
- Lee Viau (1896, 1898)
- Sam Woodruff (1899)
- Rasty Wright (1899, MGR)
- Henry Wilson (1897)

== See also ==
- Paterson Giants players
- Paterson Weavers players
- Paterson Silk Weavers players
