= John Gochnaur =

American baseball player (1875-1929)

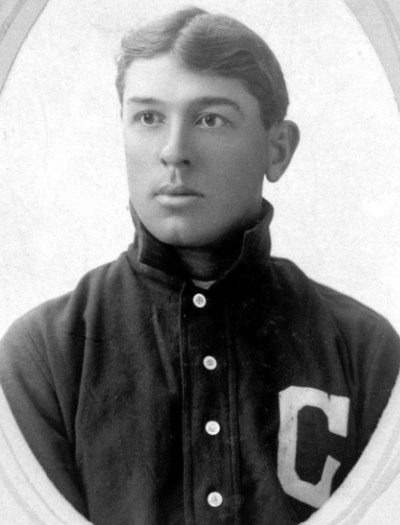
- Shortstop
- Born: September 12, 1875; Altoona, Pennsylvania, U.S.
- Died: September 27, 1929 (aged 54); Altoona, Pennsylvania, U.S.
- Batted: Right Threw: Right

MLB debut
- September 29, 1901, for the Brooklyn Superbas

Last MLB appearance
- September 29, 1903, for the Cleveland Naps

MLB statistics
- Batting average: .187
- Home runs: 0
- Runs batted in: 87
- Stats at Baseball Reference

Teams
- Brooklyn Superbas (1901); Cleveland Bronchos/Naps (1902–1903)

John Peter Gochnaur (September 12, 1875 – September 27, 1929) was an American professional baseball player. He played three seasons in Major League Baseball (MLB), from 1901 to 1903, for the Brooklyn Superbas and Cleveland Broncos/Naps. He appeared in 264 major league games, all as a shortstop.

== Early life ==
Gochnaur was born in Altoona, Pennsylvania, and became a big fan of Germany Smith, who played with Altoona Mountain City in 1884.

== Professional career ==
=== Minor leagues ===
Gochnaur began his professional baseball career with the Portsmouth Browns in 1896 as a second baseman. After short stints with the Roanoke Magicians and the Hagerstown Lions, he moved to Brockton, Massachusetts to join the New England League's Brockton Shoemakers for the 1897–98 seasons. In 1899, he played for the Paterson Giants of the Atlantic League.

He relocated to Dayton, Ohio around the turn of the century, and had a career year with the Dayton Veterans in 1900, when he batted .278 with one home run, six triples and 28 doubles. This was also the year when he was moved to shortstop full-time, where he played the rest of his professional career. He put up similar numbers for the Dayton Old Soldiers in 1901, including a career-high 14 triples, before being acquired by the Brooklyn Superbas toward the end of the season.

=== Brooklyn ===
In three games for the Superbas at the end of the 1901 season, Gochnaur collected four hits and a walk in twelve plate appearances. Though he committed no errors on the field, Gochnaur displayed limited range at short. Following the season, he moved on to the Cleveland Broncos.

=== Cleveland ===
Gochnaur batted .185 with no home runs and 37 runs batted in as the startindg 2nd basemen for Cleveland in 1902. Despite 48 errors, including five in one doubleheader, his .933 fielding percentage was third best in the league. He was handed the starting job for a second season, in which he again batted .185 with no home runs. The 98 errors he committed at short were, however, too much for manager Bill Armour to bear. In 1904, Terry Turner took over at shortstop for Cleveland.

=== Later career ===
Gochnaur played the independent circuit through 1907 before becoming an umpire. He also was an Altoona Police Department officer, Pennsylvania Railroad policeman, and bartender.

Along with holding the distinction of being the last major leaguer to commit at least ninety errors in a season, Gochnaur holds the record for most at bats (908) without a home run by a player with a career batting average below .200. He also holds the single-season record for RBIs by a player with a career average under .200 (48, 1903).

== Personal life ==
Gochnaur died of pneumonia at the age of 54.

== Pop cultural references ==
In 2005, Congressman Rob Bishop, (R-Utah) in speaking to Congress about the Endangered Species Act, claimed that it was an inept act in the way that Gochnaur was an inept baseball player.

In a 2010 episode of the TV series Bones entitled "The Rocker In The Rinse Cycle," Hodgins refers to Gochnaur as the "Worst baseball player ever."
