= Pop Tate =

Pop Tate may refer to:

- Pop Tate (Archie Comics), an Archie Comics character
- Pop Tate (baseball) (1860–1932), Major League Baseball catcher
