= Broad Street Park (Richmond, Virginia) =

Ballpark in Richmond, Virginia (1897-1916)

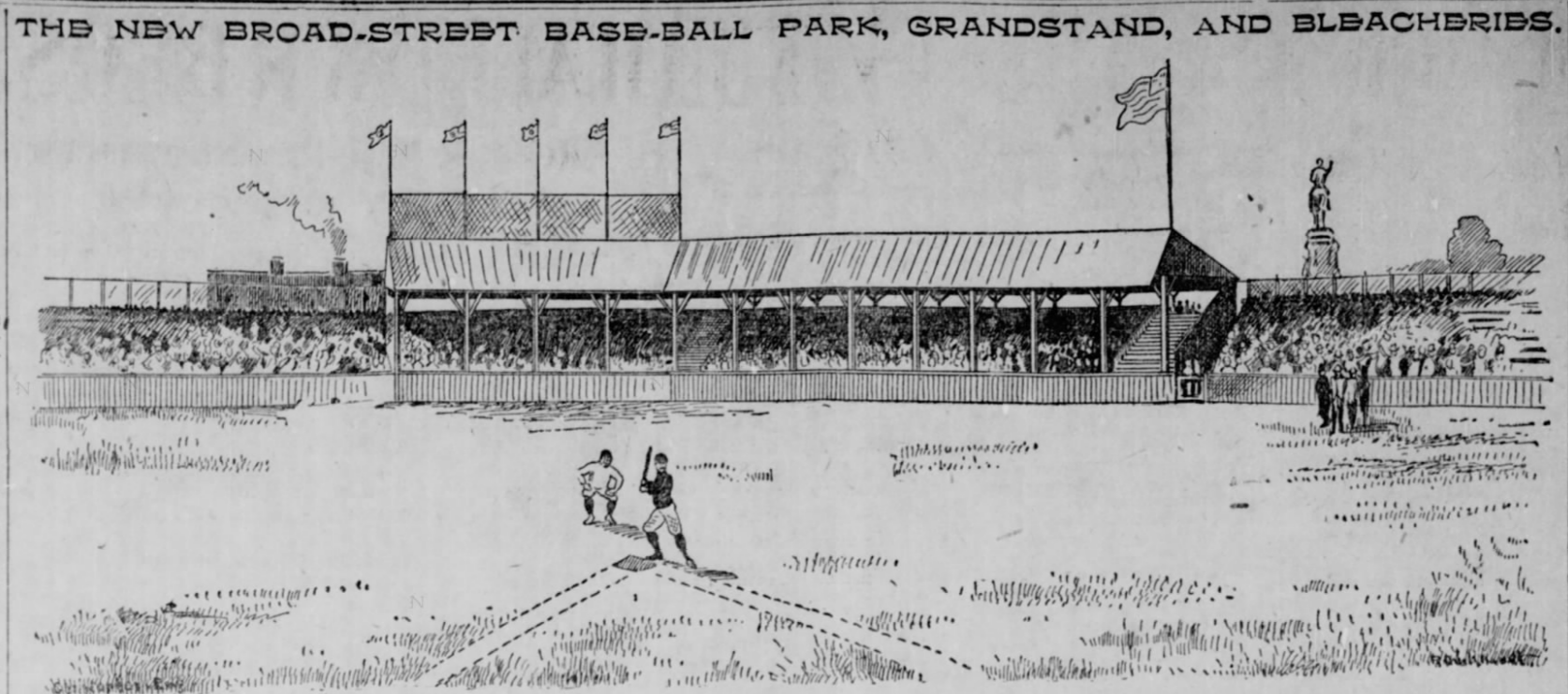
- Illustration of Broad Street Park published in The Richmond Dispatch (1897)
- Location: Richmond Virginia, U.S.
- Capacity: 6,000 (1897)

Construction
- Opened: 1897
- Closed: 1916

Tenants
- Richmond Bluebirds (Atlantic League, Virginia–North Carolina League) (1897–1901); Richmond Spiders football (1897–1916); Philadelphia Phillies (NL) (spring training) (1903); Richmond Colts (Virginia League) (1906–1912)

Broad Street Park, sometimes spelled Broad-Street Park, was the name for two stadiums located in Richmond, Virginia. Broad Street Park (I) was open from 1897 to 1912 and Broad Street Park (II) was used from 1913 to 1916. They hosted college football and Minor League Baseball. Broad Street Park served as the home field for the Richmond Spiders football team of Richmond College—now known as the University of Richmond—from 1897 to 1916.

== History ==
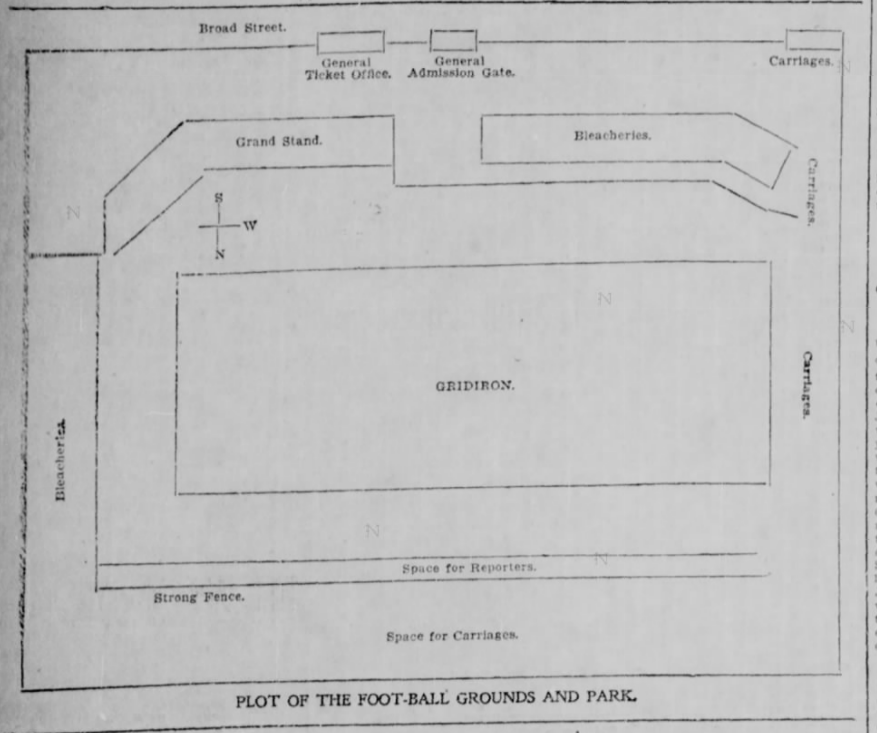
Map of Broad Street Park published in The Times (1898)

Broad Street Park opened in 1897 as the home field for the Richmond Bluebirds of Atlantic League. It was the largest athletic facility constructed in Richmond at the time, with a seating capacity over 6,000.

Home plate was situated 80 feet from the grandstand. The field dimensions were 295 feet down the left field foul line and 340 feet down the right field foul line, with the fences extending to a distance of 560 feet from home place in right field. The stadium was located on Broad Street near its dead-end intersection with Allen Avenue on land leased from the Richmond, Fredericksburg and Potomac Railroad. It overlooked the railyard to the north.

The first game at Broad Street Park was played on April 3, 1897, when the Richmond Bluebirds beat Richmond College by a score of 11 to 3.

The first football game at Broad Street Park was played on October 2, 1897, between the Richmond Athletics and the Richmond Spiders of Richmond College.

The Philadelphia Phillies held spring training in Richmond in 1903; they practiced and played games at Broad Street Park.
