= Stub Brown =

American baseball player (1870–1948)

- Pitcher
- Born: August 3, 1870; Baltimore, Maryland
- Died: March 10, 1948 (aged 77); Baltimore, Maryland
- Batted: Unknown Threw: Left

MLB debut
- August 15, 1893, for the Baltimore Orioles

Last MLB appearance
- June 15, 1897, for the Cincinnati Reds

MLB statistics
- Win–loss record: 4–1
- Earned run average: 4.90
- Strikeouts: 10
- Stats at Baseball Reference

Teams
- Baltimore Orioles (1893–1894); Cincinnati Reds (1897)

Richard P. "Stub" Brown (August 3, 1870 – March 10, 1948) was an American pitcher in Major League Baseball from 1893 to 1897, for the Baltimore Orioles and Cincinnati Reds. He stood at 6' 2" and weighed 220 lbs.

== Career ==
Brown started his professional baseball career in 1893, with the National League's Baltimore Orioles. He pitched nine innings and allowed six earned runs in his rookie season. The following year, he won his first three starts from May 2 to May 12 and went 4–0. However, he then became dissatisfied with his salary and left the club in June. His manager, Ned Hanlon, simply stated that: "The Baltimore club took [Brown] off the lots and gave him the opportunity to make a reputation for himself, and it doesn't seem to me that he appreciates his good fortune." The Orioles would eventually win the pennant that year.

After leaving Baltimore, Brown pitched for the Lynchburg Hill Climbers of the Virginia League. In 1896, he went 7–2 with a 3.35 earned run average. He made it back to the major leagues with the Cincinnati Reds in 1897. On June 12, Sporting Life reported that Brown, "a big, husky fellow with lots of sand and confidence," said that he would "hold his own." Brown pitched 13 innings for Cincinnati and made his last major league appearance on June 15.

Over the next few years, Brown pitched for various teams in the Atlantic League, Western League, and Eastern Shore League. He died in 1948, in his hometown of Baltimore, Maryland, and was buried in Green Mount Cemetery.
