= John Gilroy (baseball) =

American baseball player (1875–1897)

John M. Gilroy
- Pitcher/Outfielder
- Born: October 26, 1875; Washington, D.C., U.S.
- Died: August 4, 1897 (aged 21); Norfolk, Virginia, U.S.
- Batted: Unknown Threw: Unknown

MLB debut
- August 30, 1895, for the Washington Senators

Last MLB appearance
- April 18, 1896, for the Washington Senators

MLB statistics
- Win–loss record: 1–4
- Earned run average: 6.23
- Strikeouts: 2
- Stats at Baseball Reference

Teams
- Washington Senators (1895–1896)

John M. Gilroy (October 26, 1875 – August 4, 1897) was a 19th-century Major League Baseball pitcher, outfielder and catcher.

== Early life ==
John M. Gilroy was born on October 16, 1875, in Washington, D.C.

== Career ==
Gilroy worked for the U.S. Department of War. In 1894, he joined the War Department's baseball team. He also played for the Washington Stars, an amateur baseball team.

Gilroy played for the Washington Senators of the National League during the 1895 and 1896 baseball seasons. He was playing with the Norfolk Jewels of the Atlantic League in 1897 when he died.

== Death ==
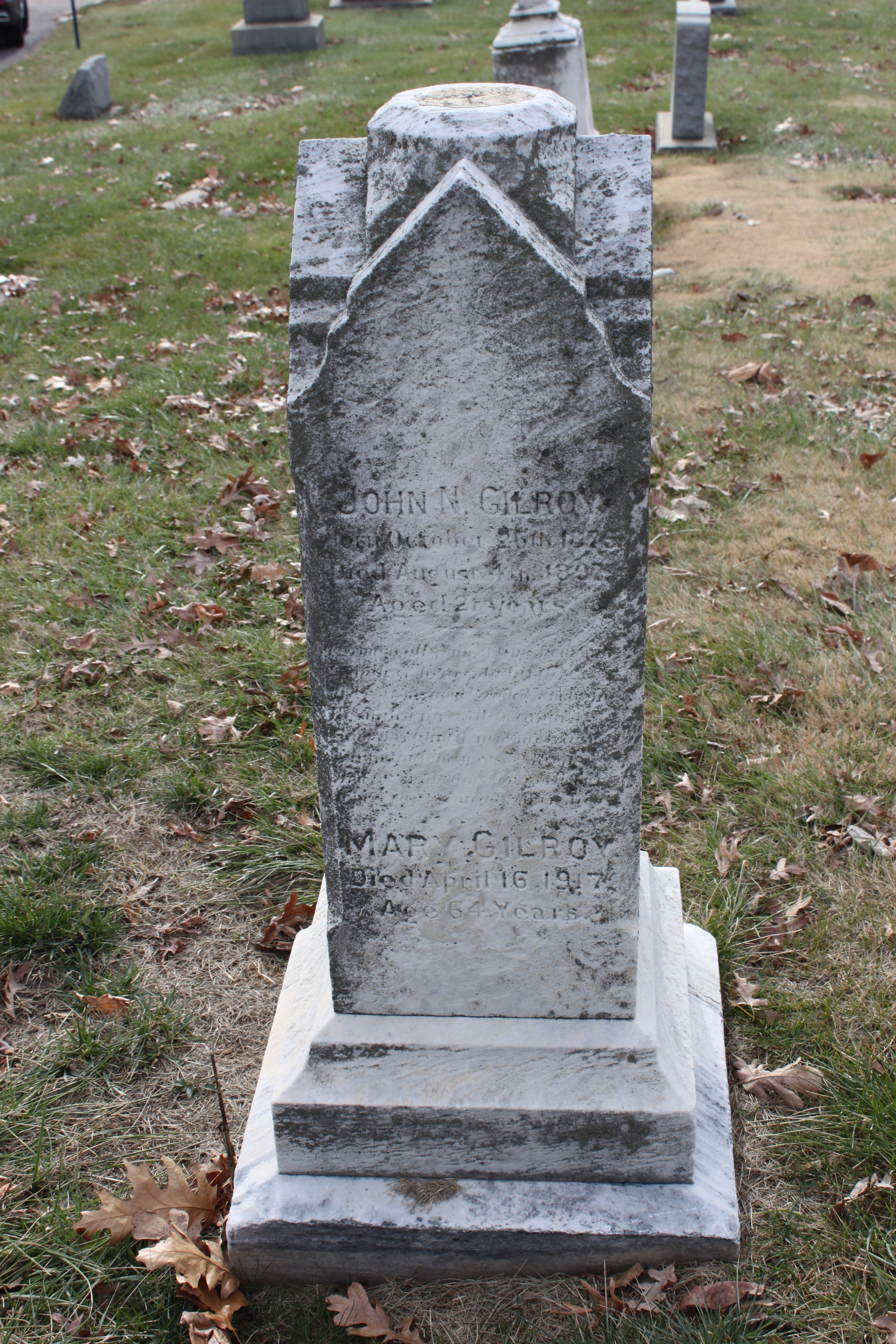
Grave of Gilroy at Mount Olivet Cemetery

Gilroy died on August 4, 1897, in Norfolk, Virginia. He was interred at Mount Olivet Cemetery in Washington, D.C.
