= Dummy Stephenson =

American baseball player (1869–1924)

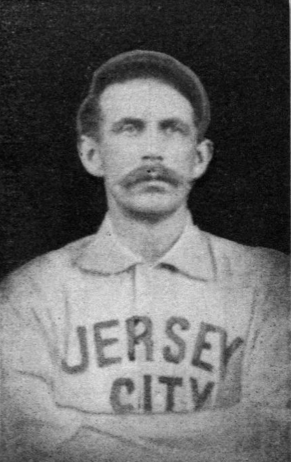
- Outfielder
- Born: September 22, 1869; Petersburg, Cape May County, New Jersey, U.S.
- Died: December 1, 1924 (aged 55); Trenton, New Jersey, U.S.
- Batted: Right Threw: Right

MLB debut
- September 9, 1892, for the Philadelphia Phillies

Last MLB appearance
- September 16, 1892, for the Philadelphia Phillies

MLB statistics
- Batting average: .270
- Home runs: 0
- Runs batted in: 5
- Stats at Baseball Reference

Teams
- Philadelphia Phillies (1892)

Reuben Crandol "Dummy" Stephenson (September 22, 1869 – December 1, 1924) was an American professional baseball first baseman and center fielder of the late 19th century. He played in eight games as an outfielder for the Philadelphia Phillies of the National League in 1892.

== Biography ==
Stephenson was born in the Petersburg section of Upper Township, New Jersey. (Note: Stephenson was born "in Upper Township, a large town in Cape May County, New Jersey. During the first half of the nineteenth century the towns of Dennis and Ocean, now known as Ocean City, were separated from Upper because it was so vast. Stephenson is often cited as hailing from Petersburg, but that is merely a post office designation, not typically used as a biographical reference in baseball encyclopedias.") He was given the nickname "Dummy" due to his deafness.

Stephenson's professional baseball career spanned 1892 to 1898, plus a final season in 1900. His major league experience was limited to eight games as a center fielder for the Philadelphia Phillies in September 1892, during which he batted 10-for-37 (.270) with five runs batted in (RBIs). Stephenson then played in the Pennsylvania State League during 1893 and 1894 for three different teams. He spent 1895 in the New England League, 1896 in the Virginia League, 1897 back in the New England League, and 1898 in the New York State League. His final professional season was spent in the Atlantic League in 1900, after which he played in semi-professional leagues for several years. Statistics for most of Stephenson's minor league seasons are incomplete; he had a batting average over .300 per the limited records available. In addition to his primary positions as a center fielder and first baseman, he pitched in at least one game during both the 1893 and 1894 seasons.

Stephenson died on December 1, 1924, in Trenton, New Jersey and was interred at the Union Cemetery in South Dennis, New Jersey; he was survived by his wife and three daughters.
