= Henry Cote =

American baseball player (1864–1940)

- Catcher
- Born: February 19, 1864; Troy, New York, U.S.
- Died: April 28, 1940 (aged 76); Troy, New York, U.S.
- Batted: Unknown Threw: Right

MLB debut
- September 16, 1894, for the Louisville Colonels

Last MLB appearance
- May 12, 1895, for the Louisville Colonels

MLB statistics
- Batting average: .297
- Home runs: 0
- RBI: 8
- Stats at Baseball Reference

Teams
- Louisville Colonels (1894–1895)

Henry Joseph Cote (February 19, 1864 – April 28, 1940) was an American Major League Baseball catcher who played with the Louisville Colonels in 1894 and 1895. His minor league career stretched from 1890 to 1910.
