= Carney Flynn =

American baseball player (1875–1947)

- Pitcher
- Born: January 23, 1875; Cincinnati, Ohio, U.S.
- Died: February 10, 1947 (aged 72); Cincinnati, Ohio, U.S.
- Batted: Left Threw: Left

MLB debut
- July 17, 1894, for the Cincinnati Reds

Last MLB appearance
- September 12, 1896, for the Washington Senators

MLB statistics
- Win–loss record: 0–5
- Earned run average: 11.27
- Strikeouts: 11
- Stats at Baseball Reference

Teams
- Cincinnati Reds (1894); New York Giants (1896); Washington Senators (1896)

Cornelius Francis Xavier Flynn (January 23, 1875 – February 10, 1947) was an American professional baseball pitcher.

== Early life and amateur career ==
Flynn was the youngest of five children born to Irish immigrants in Cincinnati.

Flynn graduated from St. Xavier College in 1893 where he played college baseball.

== Professional career ==
After three months in the Southern League, Flynn made his National League debut with the Cincinnati Reds on July 17, 1894 in relief of Lem Cross in a game against the Cleveland Spiders. Flynn, who told friends before the game that he was not feeling well, allowed seven runs during the eighth inning. He started his next outing on July 29 and, according to The Cincinnati Enquirer, "was too badly shaken up with stage fright to do himself justice." He pitched poorly in a short outing before being relieved by Tom Parrott. He would be released by the Reds in August without appearing in another game.

Flynn spent 1895 pitching in Richmond, Virginia in the Virginia State League and won twenty-five games. He was picked up by the New York Giants at the end of the season.

Flynn's time in New York was tumultuous. After a poor start to the season, the Giants suspended him without pay in early May and sent him home to Cincinnati because he was supposedly in poor physical condition. Flynn disagreed with the assessment and received an examination from a physician who reported that he was in peak condition. That same month, he was docked four days' pay for leaving the team to attend his mother's funeral. By June, Flynn had been suspended indefinitely for alleged insubordination. He claimed the charges were fabricated because he refused a minor league assignment. He brought the case to National League president Nicholas Young. However, because he also retained John Montgomery Ward to file a civil lawsuit in Ohio against the Giants, the League declined to hear his case. John T. Brush, owner of the Reds and rival of Giants owner Andrew Freedman, came to Flynn's defense, saying publicly "The New York Club accepted Flynn's terms, and stipulated that if he was not strong enough he was to be released ... Instead of releasing him, as should have been done, Flynn was goaded and taunted until he lost his temper. Then he was fined and suspended for the balance of the season, on the ground of insubordination. It was a cowardly bit of revenge, and the league should not be asked to back up such a piece of tyranny." On July 31, the Giants severed their relationship with Flynn by trading him to the Washington Senators along with Duke Farrell and $2,500 for Bill Joyce. In August, he ultimately won his suit against the Giants and was granted $300 in back pay (equivalent to $11,610 in 2025). Flynn's outing against the Philadelphia Phillies on September 12, 1896 would be his last in the big leagues.

Flynn did not pitch in the Major Leagues again after the 1896 season. It was thought that Flynn lost speed and effectiveness due to his being shelved by the Giants for most of the 1896 season. On March 26, 1897, he was released by the Senators. A few days later, he signed a contract to return to Richmond to play minor league ball. He was subsequently released from the team after only one game and never played another professional baseball game.

== Later life and death ==
In October 1897, The Sporting Life reported that Flynn was attempting a comeback and rehabilitating his arm in a gym but he was not able to catch on with any professional teams. After briefly relocating to work in California's oil industry, he returned to Ohio where he worked in the railroad industry and lived out the rest of his days with his siblings. He died at age 72 of gangrene from a ruptured bladder.
