= Doc Sechrist =

American baseball player (1876–1950)

- Pitcher
- Born: February 10, 1876; Williamstown, Kentucky, U.S.
- Died: April 2, 1950 (aged 74); Louisville, Kentucky, U.S.
- Batted: Right Threw: Right

MLB debut
- April 28, 1899, for the New York Giants

Last MLB appearance
- April 28, 1899, for the New York Giants

MLB statistics
- Batters faced: 2
- Innings pitched: 0
- Earned runs allowed: 0
- Stats at Baseball Reference

Teams
- New York Giants (1899)

Theodore O'Hara Sechrist (February 10, 1876 – April 2, 1950) was an American professional baseball player. He was a pitcher who played for the New York Giants of the National League in one game, on April 28, 1899. He faced two batters and walked both of them. Because they did not score and he did not record an out, he has no official ERA from his appearance. In addition to his brief major league appearance, he played in the minor leagues from 1895 through 1904. He is buried in the Somerset City Cemetery, Somerset, Kentucky, with his wife, Gertrude.
