= Jack Wadsworth =

American baseball player (1867–1941)

- Pitcher
- Born: December 17, 1867; Wellington, Ohio, U.S.
- Died: July 8, 1941 (aged 78); Elyria, Ohio, U.S.
- Batted: Left Threw: Right

MLB debut
- May 1, 1890, for the Cleveland Spiders

Last MLB appearance
- April 29, 1895, for the Louisville Colonels

MLB statistics
- Win–loss record: 6–38
- Innings pitched: 367 2/3
- Earned run average: 6.85
- Stats at Baseball Reference

Teams
- Cleveland Spiders (1890); Baltimore Orioles (1893); Louisville Colonels (1894–1895)

John L. Wadsworth (December 17, 1867 – July 8, 1941) was an American Major League Baseball pitcher who played for four seasons. He played for the Cleveland Spiders in 1890, the Baltimore Orioles in 1893, and the Louisville Colonels from 1894 to 1895.
