= Tom Messitt =

American baseball player (1874–1934)

- Catcher
- Born: July 27, 1874; Philadelphia, Pennsylvania, U.S.
- Died: September 22, 1934 (aged 60); Chicago, Illinois, U.S.
- Batted: Unknown Threw: Right

MLB debut
- September 14, 1899, for the Louisville Colonels

Last MLB appearance
- September 20, 1899, for the Louisville Colonels

MLB statistics
- Batting average: .091
- Home runs: 0
- Runs batted in: 0
- Stats at Baseball Reference

Teams
- Louisville Colonels (1899)

Thomas John Messitt (July 27, 1874 – September 22, 1934) was an American Major League Baseball catcher for the 1899 Louisville Colonels.
