= Jim Gilman =

American baseball player (1870–1912)

- Third baseman
- Born: June 14, 1870; Cleveland, Ohio, U.S.
- Died: December 21, 1912 (aged 42); Cleveland, Ohio, U.S.
- Batted: Unknown Threw: Right

MLB debut
- July 10, 1893, for the Cleveland Spiders

Last MLB appearance
- July 12, 1893, for the Cleveland Spiders

MLB statistics
- Batting average: .286
- Home runs: 0
- Runs batted in: 1
- Stats at Baseball Reference

Teams
- Cleveland Spiders (1893)

James Joseph Gilman (June 14, 1870 – December 21, 1912) was an American professional baseball third baseman who played for the Cleveland Spiders of the National League in June 1893. His minor league career lasted through 1897.
