= Jack Wentz =

American baseball player (1863–1907)

- Second baseman
- Born: March 4, 1863; Louisville, Kentucky, U.S.
- Died: September 14, 1907 (aged 44); Louisville, Kentucky, U.S.
- Batted: Right Threw: Right

MLB debut
- April 15, 1891, for the Louisville Colonels

Last MLB appearance
- April 15, 1891, for the Louisville Colonels

MLB statistics
- Batting average: .250
- Home runs: 0
- RBI: 0
- Stats at Baseball Reference

Teams
- Louisville Colonels (1891)

John George Wentz (March 4, 1863 – September 14, 1907) was an American right-handed second baseman who played in one game for the Louisville Colonels in 1891. He was born John George Werntz.

Wentz appeared in his lone big league game on April 15, 1891, at the age of 28. He had four at-bats, collecting one hit for a .250 batting average. In the field, he committed two errors for a .667 fielding percentage.

Wentz also spent a few years in the minors, until at least 1904.

Following his death, he was interred at St. Louis Cemetery in Louisville.
