= Art Madison =

American baseball player (1871–1933)

- Second baseman / Shortstop
- Born: January 14, 1871; Clarksburg, Massachusetts, U.S.
- Died: January 27, 1933 (aged 62); North Adams, Massachusetts, U.S.
- Batted: Right Threw: Right

MLB debut
- September 9, 1895, for the Philadelphia Phillies

Last MLB appearance
- August 22, 1899, for the Pittsburgh Pirates

MLB statistics
- Batting average: .289
- Home runs: 0
- Runs batted in: 27
- Stats at Baseball Reference

Teams
- Philadelphia Phillies (1895); Pittsburgh Pirates (1899)

Arthur M. Madison (January 14, 1871 – January 27, 1933) was an American Major League Baseball infielder. He played for the 1895 Philadelphia Phillies and 1899 Pittsburgh Pirates. He remained active in the minor leagues through to 1906.
