= Lefty Marr =

American baseball player (1862–1912)

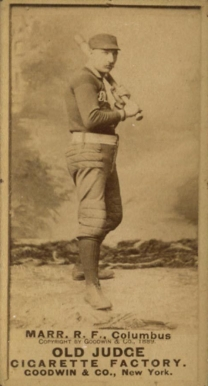
- Right fielder / Third baseman
- Born: September 19, 1862; Cincinnati, Ohio, U.S.
- Died: January 11, 1912 (aged 49); New Britain, Connecticut, U.S.
- Batted: Left Threw: Left

MLB debut
- October 6, 1886, for the Cincinnati Red Stockings

Last MLB appearance
- August 16, 1891, for the Cincinnati Kelly's Killers

MLB statistics
- Batting average: .289
- Home runs: 2
- Runs batted in: 186
- Stats at Baseball Reference

Teams
- Cincinnati Red Stockings (1886); Columbus Solons (1889); Cincinnati Red Stockings (1890–1891); Cincinnati Kelly's Killers (1891)

Charles W. "Lefty" Marr (September 19, 1862 – January 11, 1912) was an American professional baseball player who played outfield and third base in the Major Leagues from 1886 to 1891. He would play for the Cincinnati Red Stockings (AA/NL), Columbus Solons, and Cincinnati Kelly's Killers.

== See also ==
- List of Major League Baseball annual triples leaders
