= Fritz Clausen =

American baseball player (1869–1960)

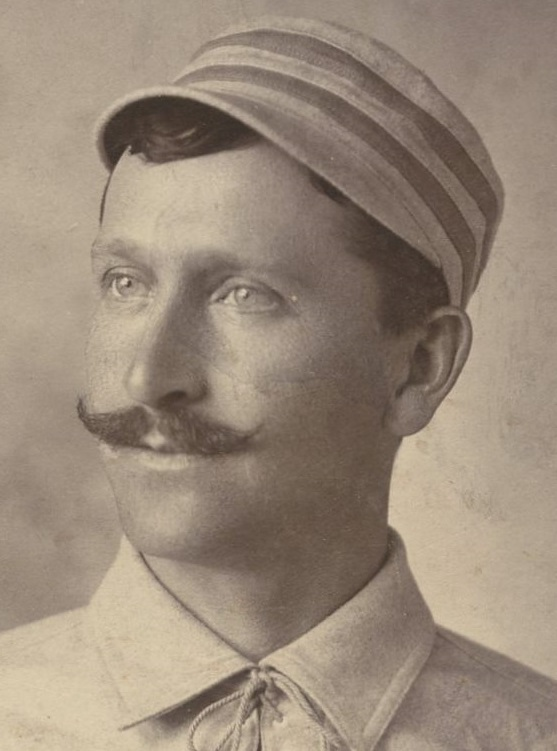
- Pitcher
- Born: April 26, 1869; New York City, New York, U.S.
- Died: February 11, 1960 (aged 90); Memphis, Tennessee, U.S.
- Batted: Right Threw: Left

MLB debut
- July 23, 1892, for the Louisville Colonels

Last MLB appearance
- May 4, 1896, for the Louisville Colonels

MLB statistics
- Win–loss record: 16–22
- Earned run average: 3.58
- Strikeouts: 134
- Stats at Baseball Reference

Former teams
- Monmouth Maple Cities (minor league) (1890)

Teams
- Louisville Colonels (1892–1893); Chicago Colts (1893–1894); Louisville Colonels (1896)

Frederick William "Fritz" Clausen (April 26, 1869 – February 11, 1960) was an American professional baseball pitcher in Major League Baseball who played between 1892 and 1896 for the Louisville Colonels, and Chicago Colts. Clausen batted right-handed and threw left-handed. He was born in New York City.

He played for the Monmouth Maple Cities (Illinois-Iowa (minor) League) in 1890.

In a four-season career, Clausen posted a 16–22 record with 134 strikeouts and a 3.58 ERA in 324 1/3 innings pitched, including 36 complete games and two shutouts.

Clausen died from injuries suffered in an accidental fall in Memphis, Tennessee, at the age of 90.
