= George Fox (baseball) =

American baseball player (1868–1914)

- First baseman / Third baseman / Catcher
- Born: December 1, 1868; Pottstown, Pennsylvania, U.S.
- Died: May 8, 1914 (aged 45); Philadelphia, Pennsylvania, U.S.
- Batted: Unknown Threw: Unknown

MLB debut
- July 13, 1891, for the Louisville Colonels

Last MLB appearance
- September 7, 1899, for the Pittsburgh Pirates

MLB statistics
- Batting average: .200
- Home runs: 1
- Runs scored: 5
- Stats at Baseball Reference

Teams
- Louisville Colonels (1891); Pittsburgh Pirates (1899)

George B. Fox (December 1, 1868 – May 8, 1914) was an American first baseman in Major League Baseball in the 19th century. He played for the Louisville Colonels of the American Association in 1891 and the Pittsburgh Pirates of the National League in 1899. He played in the minors between his two Major League stints.

== Sources ==
- Career statistics from Baseball Reference · Baseball Reference (Minors) · Retrosheet · Baseball Almanac
