= Jake Wells =

American baseball player (1863–1927)

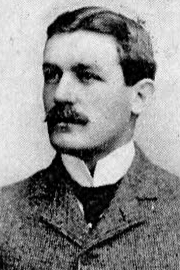
- Catcher
- Born: August 9, 1863; Memphis, Tennessee, U.S.
- Died: March 16, 1927 (aged 63); Hendersonville, North Carolina, U.S.
- Batted: Right Threw: Right

MLB debut
- August 10, 1888, for the Detroit Wolverines

Last MLB appearance
- August 19, 1890, for the St. Louis Browns

MLB statistics
- Batting average: .210
- Home runs: 0
- Run batted in: 14
- Stats at Baseball Reference

Teams
- Detroit Wolverines (1888); St. Louis Browns (1890)

Jacobs Wells (August 9, 1863 – March 16, 1927) was an American right-handed Major League Baseball catcher who played for the Detroit Wolverines in 1888 and the St. Louis Browns in 1890.

== Biography ==
He made his major league debut on August 10, 1888. He spent 16 games with the Wolverines that season, hitting .158 in 57 at-bats. He did not play in the big leagues in 1889, though he did in 1890 for the Browns. He appeared in 30 games for them that season, hitting .238 with 12 RBI and 17 runs in 105 at-bats. He appeared in his final game on August 19, 1890.

Overall, he spent 46 games in the majors, hitting .210 in 162 at-bats. He had 22 runs, 14 RBI and OPS of .511. In the field, he committed 24 errors in 44 games, for a .932 fielding percentage.

He also spent multiple seasons managing in the minor leagues, from either 1894 or 1895 to 1899.

After his baseball career, Jake Wells was involved in the entertainment industry, opening several theaters for stage and silent movies.

In March 1927, Wells told the manager of an inn which he owned in Hendersonville, North Carolina that "life is not worth living," pulled out a revolver, shot himself in the head and was brought to a hospital where he died.

Following his death, he was interred at St. Mary's Cemetery in Norfolk, Virginia.
