= Hal O'Hagan =

American baseball player (1869–1913)

- First baseman
- Born: September 30, 1869; Washington, D.C., U.S.
- Died: January 14, 1913 (aged 43); Newark, New Jersey, U.S.
- Batted: Unknown Threw: Right

MLB debut
- September 24, 1892, for the Washington Senators

Last MLB appearance
- July 17, 1902, for the New York Giants

MLB statistics
- Batting average: .187
- Home runs: 0
- Runs batted in: 19
- Stats at Baseball Reference

Teams
- Washington Senators (1892); Chicago Cubs (1902); Cleveland Bronchos (1902); New York Giants (1902)

Patrick Henry O'Hagan (September 30, 1869 – January 14, 1913) was an American Major League Baseball first baseman who played for two seasons. He played for the Washington Senators in 1892 and for the three following teams in 1902: the Chicago Cubs, the Cleveland Bronchos, and the New York Giants.
