= Pete Woodruff =

American baseball player (1874–1918)

- Right fielder
- Born: April 2, 1874; Baltimore, Maryland, U.S.
- Died: April 21, 1918 (aged 44); New York City, U.S.
- Batted: Right Threw: Right

MLB debut
- September 19, 1899, for the New York Giants

Last MLB appearance
- October 14, 1899, for the New York Giants

MLB statistics
- Batting average: .246
- Home runs: 2
- Runs batted in: 7
- Stats at Baseball Reference

Teams
- New York Giants (1899)

Peter Francis Woodruff (April 2, 1874 – April 21, 1918) was an American professional baseball player. He played part of the 1899 season in Major League Baseball for the New York Giants, primarily as a right fielder.
