= Pop Tate (baseball) =

American baseball player (1860–1932)

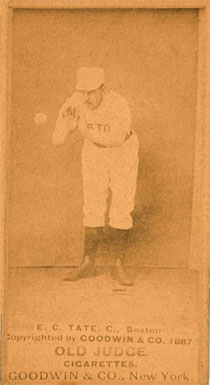
- Catcher
- Born: December 22, 1860; Richmond, Virginia, U.S.
- Died: June 25, 1932 (aged 71); Richmond, Virginia, U.S.
- Batted: Right Threw: Left

MLB debut
- September 26, 1885, for the Boston Beaneaters

Last MLB appearance
- October 15, 1890, for the Baltimore Orioles

MLB statistics
- Batting average: .218
- Home runs: 2
- Runs batted in: 71
- Stats at Baseball Reference

Teams
- Boston Beaneaters (1885–1888); Baltimore Orioles (1889–1890)

Edward Christopher Tate (December 22, 1860 – June 25, 1932) was an American 19th-century Major League Baseball catcher. He played from 1885 to 1890 with the Boston Beaneaters and the Baltimore Orioles. He played in the minors from 1894 to 1897.

Tate Field in Richmond, Virginia was renamed in honor of Tate in 1926.
