= Atlantic League (1896–1900) =

Independent professional baseball league from 1896 to 1900

- The 1896 Paterson Silk Weavers with the Soby Cup
- Formerly: Pennsylvania State League
- Classification: Class A, Class B
- Sport: Baseball
- Founded: 1896
- Folded: June 1900
- President: Samuel B. Crane (1896); Ed Barrow (1897–99); Horace Fogel (1900)
- No. of teams: 8
- Country: United States
- Most titles: Richmond Bluebirds (2)

The Atlantic League was a minor league baseball league that operated between 1896 and 1900 in the Northeastern United States. It was the successor of the Pennsylvania State League, which had operated from 1892 to 1895. The name has subsequently been reused twice, for another short-lived league in 1914, and for a contemporary independent minor league.

== History ==
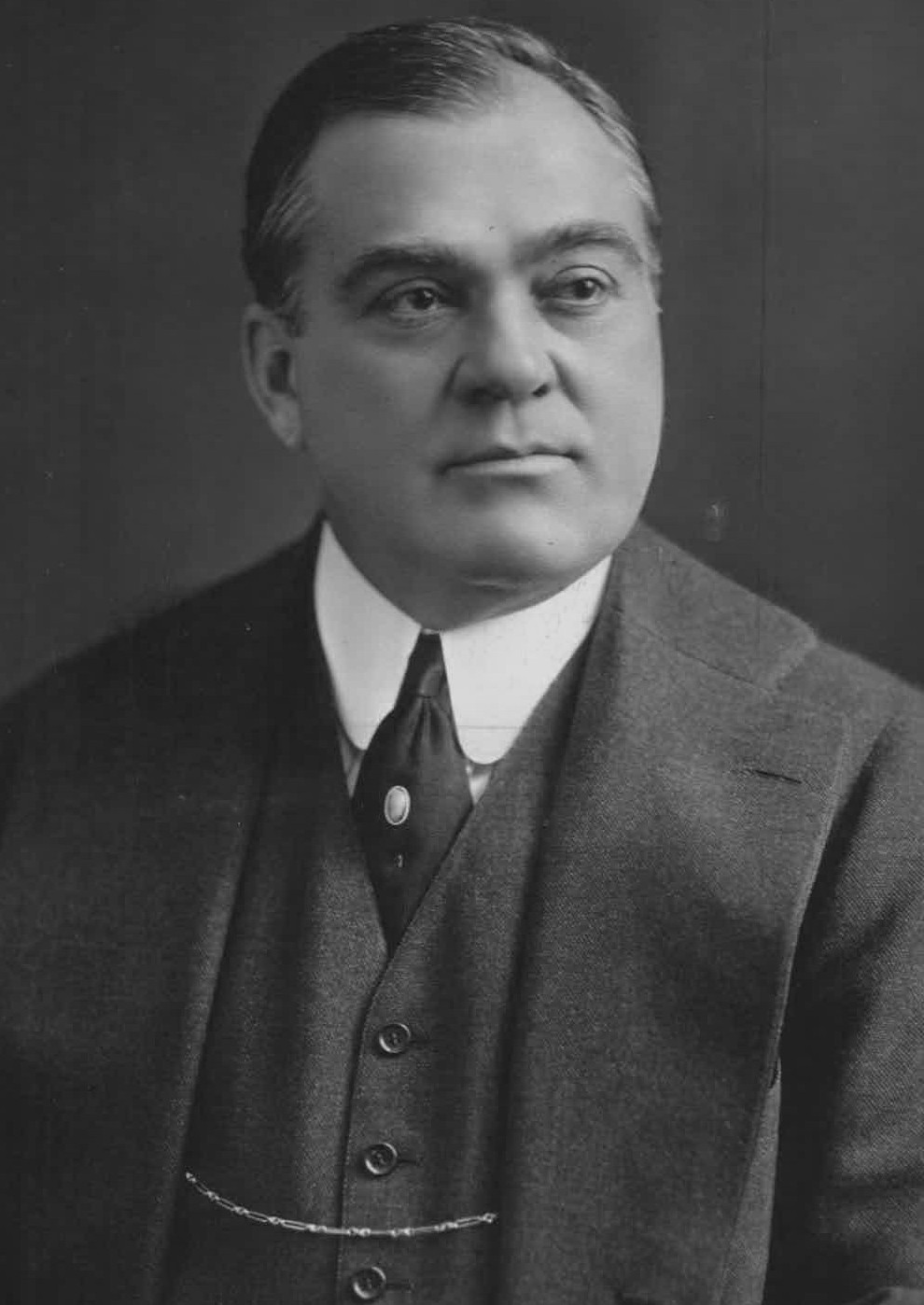
Ed Barrow, president of the Atlantic League for three of its five seasons

=== League champions ===
Season	Champion	Record	Class	League size	Ref.
1896	Newark Colts	82–61 (.573)	A	6 teams†	
1897	Lancaster Maroons	90–45 (.667)	A	8 teams	
1898	Richmond Bluebirds	77–44 (.636)	B	8 teams	
1899	Richmond Bluebirds	63–25 (.716)	A	8 teams‡	
1900	Scranton Miners	26–7 (.788)	A	8 teams‡	

† In 1896, eight teams competed; at any point in time, there were six teams active.
‡ In 1899 and 1900, there were only six teams active at season's end.

=== Teams ===
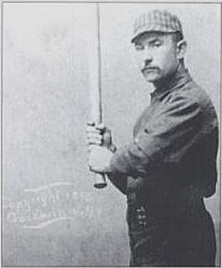
Oyster Burns, player-manager of the Newark Colts in 1896

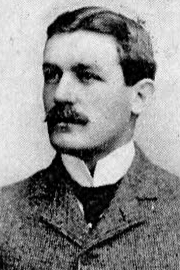
Jake Wells, the only manager of the Richmond Bluebirds

Team	City	1896	1897	1898	1899	1900
Allentown Peanuts	Allentown, Pennsylvania			✓	✓	✓
Elmira	Elmira, New York					✓
Harrisburg Ponies	Harrisburg, Pennsylvania					✓ 1/2
Hartford Bluebirds	Hartford, Connecticut	✓	✓			
Hartford Cooperatives	Hartford, Connecticut			✓		
Jersey City	Jersey City, New Jersey					✓
Lancaster Maroons	Lancaster, Pennsylvania	✓ 1/2	✓	✓	✓	
New Haven Texas Steers	New Haven, Connecticut	✓ 1/2				
New York Metropolitans	New York, New York	✓ 1/2				
Newark Colts	Newark, New Jersey	✓	✓	✓	✓	✓
Norfolk Jewels	Norfolk, Virginia		✓	✓		
Paterson Silk Weavers	Paterson, New Jersey	✓	✓	✓		
Paterson Giants	Paterson, New Jersey				✓	
Philadelphia Athletics	Philadelphia, Pennsylvania	✓ 1/2	✓			✓ 1/2
Reading Coal Heavers	Reading, Pennsylvania		✓	✓	✓	✓
Richmond Bluebirds	Richmond, Virginia		✓	✓	✓	
Scranton Miners	Scranton, Pennsylvania				✓	✓
Wilkes-Barre Coal Barons	Wilkes-Barre, Pennsylvania				✓	✓
Wilmington Peaches	Wilmington, Delaware	✓				
Total league size		6	8	8	8	8

Notes:

In 1896, New Haven disbanded on July 12; Lancaster entered the league on July 13; New York was expelled on July 13 and was replaced by Philadelphia.
In 1899, Paterson disbanded on July 4, and Scranton followed on July 9.
In 1900, Philadelphia moved to Harrisburg on June 4; Newark and Jersey City disbanded on June 2; the league disbanded on June 14.

=== Results by season ===
Teams denoted in italics disbanded during the season.

1896 (Class A)

April 23–September 13

Team	W	L	Pct.	GB
Newark	82	61	.573	—
Hartford	73	56	.566	1
Paterson	74	60	.552	3.5
New York / Philadelphia	57	69	.452	13
Wilmington	58	79	.423	20
Lancaster	26	30	.464	N/A
New Haven	21	38	.356	N/A

New York was 30–32 when replaced by Philadelphia

1897 (Class A)

April 26–September 19

Team	W	L	Pct.	GB
Lancaster	90	45	.667	—
Newark	89	52	.631	4
Hartford	78	55	.586	11
Richmond	71	59	.546	16.5
Norfolk	66	72	.478	25.5
Paterson	68	79	.463	28
Philadelphia	49	89	.355	43
Reading	40	100	.286	51

1898 (Class B)

April 25–September 10

Team	W	L	Pct.	GB
Richmond	77	44	.636	—
Lancaster	82	50	.621	0.5
Reading	72	56	.563	8.5
Paterson	65	70	.481	19
Allentown	55	67	.451	25.5
Newark	58	71	.450	26
Hartford	57	76	.429	29
Norfolk	47	79	.373	35.5

1899 (Class A)

April 27–August 6

Team	W	L	Pct.	GB
Richmond	63	25	.716	—
Wiles-Barre	49	37	.570	13
Lancaster	51	42	.548	14.5
Reading	46	40	.535	16
Allentown	37	47	.440	24
Newark	42	54	.438	25
Scranton	25	38	.397	N/A
Paterson	21	51	.292	N/A

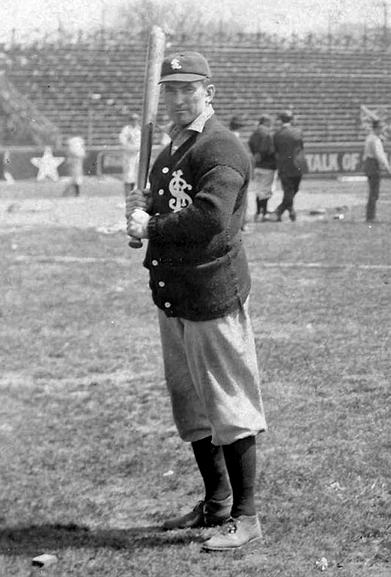
Joe Delahanty, who played for the Allentown Peanuts in 1900, led the Atlantic League in batting with a .469 average.

1900 (Class A)

April 30–June 14

Team	W	L	Pct.	GB
Scranton	26	7	.788	—
Wiles-Barre	24	13	.649	4
Reading	16	16	.500	9.5
Allentown	14	20	.412	12.5
Philadelphia / Harrisburg	10	17	.370	13
Elmira	11	19	.367	13.5
Newark	8	12	.400	N/A
Jersey City	7	12	.368	N/A

Philadelphia was 10–11 when replaced by Harrisburg

=== Soby Cup ===
The Soby Cup, made of silver, was given to the league by tobacco businessman Charles Soby of Hartford, Connecticut, in September 1896. In its first season, the cup was to be awarded to the winner of a postseason series between the league's top two teams; in subsequent years, the holder of the cup would play a series against the league's top finishing team.

Standings at the end of the 1896 season, which had Newark finishing first, were formally protested by the Paterson team, claiming that some of Newark's games were actually exhibitions. With that protest pending, the next two teams in the standings—Paterson and Hartford—arranged to play a series for the Soby Cup. Paterson won the seven-game series, four games to two. The protested standings were not ruled upon until the league's annual meeting in late November; despite inconsistencies in record-keeping, Newark was declared the pennant winner.

Following the 1897 season, the Soby Cup series should have been contested between Lancaster, that year's top team, and Paterson, who had won the cup in 1896. However, league officials decided to have the top two teams of 1897—Lancaster and Newark—play for the cup. After Lancaster and Newark could not agree to terms for a series, the Soby Cup was awarded to Lancaster, the pennant winner.

Prior to the 1898 season, the league abolished the postseason Soby Cup series, and returned to the cup to its donor. By 1951, the cup was at the Baseball Hall of Fame, where it remains as of 2019.

== Notable players ==
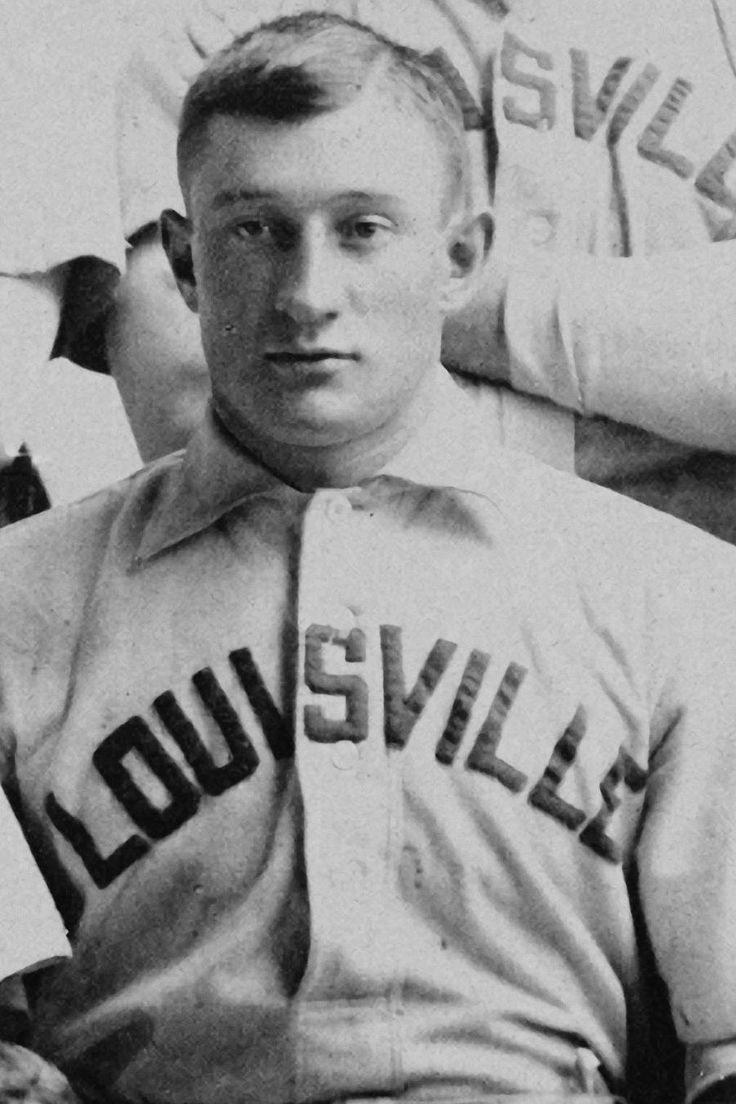
Future Hall of Famer Honus Wagner, who played for the Paterson Silk Weavers in 1896 and 1897

Notable players in the Atlantic League (1896–1900) include:

- Oyster Burns
- Bill Carrick
- Bill Clymer
- Joe Delahanty
- Ned Garvin
- Dan Kerwin
- Fred Ketchum
- Sam Leever
- John Newell
- Jerry Nops
- Hal O'Hagan
- Casey Patten
- Socks Seybold
- Lee Viau
- Tom Vickery
- Honus Wagner
- Piggy Ward
- Harry Wilhelm
- Rasty Wright
- Joe Yeager

== See also ==
- Atlantic Association
