= Staunton Presidents =

- 1939–1942; (1894, 1914, 1939–1942); Staunton, Virginia

Minor league affiliations
- Class: Independent (1894); Class D (1914, 1939–1940); Class C (1941–1942)
- League: Virginia League (1894); Virginia Mountain League (1914); Virginia League (1939–1942)

Major league affiliations
- Team: None

Minor league titles
- League titles (0): None
- Wild card berths (1): 1939

Team data
- Name: Staunton Hayseeds (1894); Staunton Lunatics (1914); Staunton Presidents (1939–1942)
- Ballpark: Fairgrounds Park (1939); Municipal Stadium (1939–1942)

The Staunton Presidents were a minor league baseball team based in Staunton, Virginia. Staunton teams played partial seasons in the 1894 Virginia League and 1914 Virginia Mountain League before the Presidents played as members the Virginia League from 1939 to 1942. The Presidents hosted home minor league games at Municipal Stadium. Staunton's use of the "Presidents" nickname corresponded to the city being the birthplace of President Woodrow Wilson.

== History ==
=== 1894 and 1914 seasons ===
Minor league baseball began in Staunton, Virginia in 1894. The Staunton Hayseeds became charter members of the Virginia League. The Virginia League began play as an Independent level league and fielded six teams, with the Lynchburg Hill Climbers, Norfolk Clam Eaters, Petersburg Farmers, Richmond Bluebirds and Roanoke Magicians, joining Staunton in beginning league play.

In their first season of minor league play, the Staunton Hayseeds relocated during the season. On August 14, 1894, Staunton, with a record of 36–53 moved to Newport News-Hampton. Finishing with an overall record of 50–64, the combined team placed fourth in the final standings. Playing under managers George Ziegler, William Donovan and C.A. Gaussen, Staunton/Newport News-Hampton finished 21.0 games behind the first place Petersburg Farmers in the final standings. The 1894 team is also referred to as the "Mountaineers." The franchise did not return to the 1895 Virginia League.

Minor league baseball returned to Staunton, Virginia in 1914. On March 3, 1914, at a meeting in Lynchburg, Virginia, discussions began for the formulation of a six–team Class D level baseball league in the region. The league teams were tentatively slated to be based in the Virginia cities of Lynchburg, Danville, Charlottesville, Clifton Forge, Staunton and Covington, with a salary limit of $800 (per team) monthly. Lynchburg, was hesitant to commit because of a previous $700 lien on its territory, a result of a previous team in the Virginia League. The league was then formed at a March 12, 1914 meeting, without Danville and Lynchburg franchises. B.F. Donovan, of Clifton Forge, was elected league president. D. R. Ellis, of Covington, was elected as vice–president.

The Staunton "Lunatics" became charter members of the four–team Class D level Virginia Mountain League, before relocating during the 1914 season. The Lunatics were joined by the Charlottesville Tuckahoes, Clifton Forge Railroaders, Covington Papermakers in beginning 1914 league play. The league schedule began play on May 14, 1914.

The Staunton use of the "Lunatics" nickname corresponds with the Western State Hospital being located in Staunton in the era.

Playing at Charlottesville on opening day, May 14, 1914, the Staunton Lunatics were defeated by Charlottesville defeated 10–4 in their first game.

On July 1, 1914, the league announced the Staunton Lunatics were relocating to Harrisonburg, Virginia with a 15–22 record. Continuing play as the Harrisonburg Lunatics, the Staunton/Harrisonburg team finished last in the 1914 Virginia Mountain League standings in a shortened season. On July 25, 1914, Staunton/Harrisonburg team had an overall record of 26–32 when the Virginia Mountain League permanently folded. Led by managers Davy Crockett and Pat Krebs, the Lunatics finished 8.5 games behind of the first place Covington Papermakers (37–26) in the final standings of the shortened season. They were followed by second place Charlottesville (31–30) and third place Clifton Forge Railroaders (28–34) in the 1914 league standings.

Shortly after the Virginia Mountain League folded, there was an unsuccessful attempt to revive the league and the teams in August, 1914, headed by Buck Hooker, manager of the Clifton Forge Railroaders. However, following the collapse of the league, the Covington and Clifton Forge teams elected to play a 10–game championship series. Charlottesville did not return to play. The Railroaders captured the unofficial league “title,” winning 7 of the 10 games over Covington.

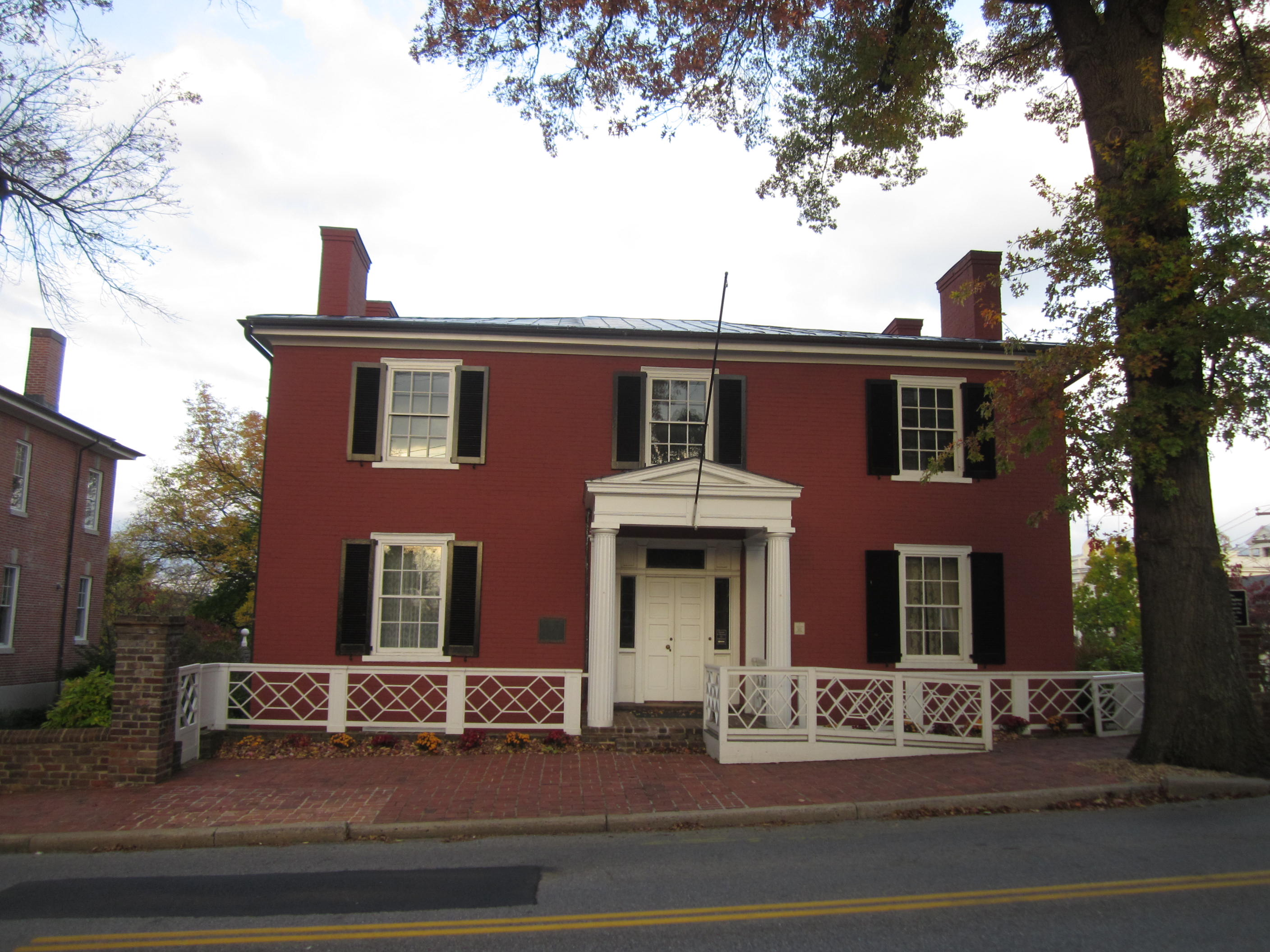
(2020) Woodrow Wilson home and birthplace. National Register of Historic Places. Staunton, Virginia

=== 1939 to 1942 - Virginia League ===
In 1939, minor league baseball returned to Staunton, as the Virginia League reformed as a four–team Class D level league. The Staunton "Presidents" joined the Harrisonburg Turks, Lynchburg Grays and Salem-Roanoke Friends in resuming league play.

The Staunton, Virginia use of the "Presidents" moniker corresponds to Staunton being the birthplace of President Woodrow Wilson, born December 28, 1856. Today, Staunton is home to the Woodrow Wilson Presidential Library and Museum.

The 1939 Staunton Presidents finished the Virginia League regular season in third place and qualified for a playoff game. Staunton ended the regular season with a record of 51–36, playing under manager Jimmy Bair and finishing 9.5 games behind the first place and eventual league champion Harrisonburg Turks. In a one-game playoff, Staunton lost to the Lynchburg Grays. Stauton's Warren Huffman won the Virginia League batting title, with a .415 average. Teammate Michael Marko led the league with a 2.52 ERA.

Continuing play in the 1940 Class D Virginia League, the Presidents finished last in the four–team league, their first of three consecutive last place finishes. Ending the season with a record of 46–69, Staunton placed fourth in the standings. Led by managers Vernon Brandes and John Brennan, Staunton finished 24.0 games behind the first place Lynchburg Senators and did not qualify for the playoff, won by Lynchburg.

The 1941 Virginia League expanded to six teams and became a Class C level league, adding the Newport News Pilots and Petersburg Rebels franchises. The Staunton Presidents ended the 1941 in 6th place with a record of 42–76. The Presidents were managed by Hank Hulvey and Gus Tebell, finishing 24.0 games behind the first place Petersburg Rebels in the final regular season standings. Staunton did not qualify for the playoffs, won by the Salem-Roanoke Friends.

In their final season of play, the 1942 Staunton Presidents ended the Virginia League regular season with a 32–94 record. Staunton placed last in the six–team league with Taylor Sanford managing the team. Finishing 47.0 games behind the first place Pulaski Counts, the Presidents did not qualify for the playoffs won by Pulaski. The Virginia League folded after the 1942 season with the onset of World War II.

When the Virginia League resumed play in 1948, Staunton did not field a franchise. Staunton, Virginia has not hosted another minor league team. Today, the Staunton Braves play as members of the collegiate summer baseball affiliated Valley Baseball League, having joined the league in 2017.

== The ballparks ==
The Staunton Presidents hosted home minor league home games at Municipal Stadium from 1939 to 1942.

Staunton also played 1939 home games at Fairgrounds Park.

== Timeline ==
Year(s)	# Yrs.	Team	Level	League
1894	1	Staunton Hayseeds	Independent	Virginia League
1914	2	Staunton Lunatics	Class D	Virginia Mountain League
1939–1940	2	Staunton Presidents	Class D	Virginia League
1941–1942	2	Staunton Presidents	Class C	Virginia League

== Year–by–year records ==
Year	Record	Finish	Manager	Playoffs/Notes
1894	50–64	4th	George Ziegler / William Donovan / C.A. Gaussen	Staunton (36–53) moved to Newport News-Hampton August 14.
1914	26–32	4th	Davy Crockett / Pat Krebs	Staunton (15–22) moved to Harrisonburg June 21; League folded July 25
1939	51–36	3rd	Jimmy Bair	Lost 1st round
1940	46–69	4th	Vernon Brandes / John Brennan	Did not qualify
1941	42–76	6th	Hank Hulvey / Gus Tebell	Did not qualify
1942	32–94	6th	Taylor Sanford	Did not qualify

== Notable alumni ==
- King Bailey (1894)
- Win Clark (1894)
- Davy Crockett (1914, MGR)
- Charlie Emig (1894)
- Dave Fultz (1894)
- Hank Hulvey (1941, MGR)
- Pat Lyons (1894)
- Harry Mace (1894)
- Mike Mahoney (1894)
- John Malarkey (1894)
- Jack McCloskey (1894)
- Gus Tebell (1941, MGR)
- George Ziegler (1894, MGR)

=== See also ===
Staunton Hayseeds players
