= Harrisonburg Turks (minor league baseball) =

- 1939–1941; Harrisonburg, Virginia

Minor league affiliations
- Class: Class D (1939–1940); Class C (1941)
- League: Virginia League (1939–1941)

Major league affiliations
- Team: None

Minor league titles
- League titles (1): 1939
- Conference titles (1): 1939
- Wild card berths (2): 1940; 1941

Team data
- Name: Harrisonburg Turks (1939–1941)
- Ballpark: Harrisonburg High School Field (1939–1941)

The Harrisonburg Turks were a minor league baseball team based in Harrisonburg, Virginia. The Turks played exclusively as members the Virginia League from 1939 to 1941, winning the 1939 league pennant and championship. The Turks qualified for the league playoffs in all three seasons of Virginia League play. The Harrisonburg Turks hosted home minor league games at the Harrisonburg High School Field.

== History ==
Harrisonburg briefly hosted minor league baseball in 1914. The Staunton Lunatics of the Class D level Virginia Mountain League, moved to Harrisonburg on July 21, 1914, with a 15–22 record. After compiling a 11–10 record while based in Harrisonburg, the team finished the season with an overall record of 26–32. Staunton/Harrisburg ended the season in last place of the four-team league, while playing the season under managers Davey Crockett and Pat Krebs.

In 1939, minor league baseball returned to Harrisonburg, when the Virginia League was reformed. The league began play as a four–team Class D level league. The Harrisonburg "Turks" joined the Lynchburg Grays, Salem-Roanoke Friends and Staunton Presidents teams in resuming Virginia League play. The Virginia League had most recently played decades earlier in 1900.

The "Turks" nickname corresponds to local history and native species. Harrisonburg is located in Rockingham County, Virginia and within the Shenandoah Valley. The area has a long history of poultry production, including turkeys. Harrisonburg hosts the Virginia Poultry Industry Museum.

In their first season of play, the 1939 Harrisonburg Turks won the Virginia League pennant and league championship. Harrisonburg ended the regular season with a record of 61–47, playing under manager Hank Hulvey and finishing 5.0 games ahead of the second place Lynchburg Grays. In a one-game playoff, the Staunton Presidents lost to Lynchburg. In the finals, Harrisonburg won the title, sweeping Lynchburg in three games. Harrisonburg's Nicholas Rhabe led the league with 156 hits, while pitcher Ernie Utz of Harrisonburg compiled 183 strikeouts, most in the league.

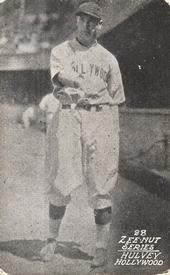
(1928) Zeenut baseball card. Hank Hulvey. Hulvey managed Harrisonburg to the 1939 Virginia League championship

Continuing play in the 1940 Class D Virginia League, the Turks placed second in the regular season standings and advanced to the playoff finals, playing the season under returning manager Hank Hulvey. Ending the Virginia League regular season with a record of 61–56, Harrisonburg placed second in the standings and finished 10.0 games behind the first place Lynchburg Senators. In the first round of the playoffs, the Turks defeated the Salem-Roanoke Friends 2 games to 1. In the finals, Harrsionburg was defeated by Lynchburg 3 games to 2. Turks player Henry Loman won the Virginia League batting title, hitting .322, while teammate Glen Adkins led the league with both 119 runs and 149 hits. Pitcher Lewis Utz of Harrisonburg led the Virginia League with an ERA of 2.87.

The 1941 Virginia League expanded to six teams and became a Class C level league, adding the Newport News Pilots and Petersburg Rebels as expansion franchises. It would be the final season for Harrisonburg, as the Turks again qualified for the playoffs. Harrisonburg ended the 1941 in fourth place with a record of 62–56, playing the season under managers Vernon Brandes / Vance Dinges. Former manager Hank Hulvey became manager of the Staunton Presidents. The Turks finished 3.5 games behind the first place Petersburg Rebels in the final regular season standings. In the playoffs, the eventual champion Salem-Roanoke Friends defeated Harrisonburg in the first round 3 games to two. The games were the final contests for the Harrisonburg minor league franchise. Nicholas Rhabe of Harrisonburg led the Virginia League with 164 total hits.

Harrisonburg did not return to the 1942 Virginia League. The team was replaced in the six-team league by the Pulaski Counts, who won the league championship. Harrisonburg has not hosted another minor league team.

The Harrisonburg "Turks" nickname was revived in 2016, when today's Harrisonburg Turks began play as members of the collegiate summer baseball affiliated Valley Baseball League.

== The ballpark ==
The Harrisonburg Turks hosted home minor league home games at the Harrisonburg High School Field from 1939 to 1941. The field had dimensions of 350-420-350 in 1939. In the era, the high School was located on South High Street.

== Timeline ==
Year(s)	# Yrs.	Team	Level	League	Ballpark
1939–1940	2	Harrisonburg Turks	Class D	Virginia League	Harrisonburg High School Field
1941	1	Harrisonburg Turks	Class C	Virginia League	Harrisonburg High School Field

== Year–by–year records ==
Year	Record	Finish	Manager	Playoffs/Notes
1939	61–47	1st	Hank Hulvey	Won pennant Won league championship
1940	61–56	2nd	Hank Hulvey	Lost in finals
1941	62–56	4th	Vernon Brandes / Vance Dinges	Lost in 1st round

== Notable alumni ==
- Davey Crockett (1914, MGR)
- Vance Dinges (1939–1940; 1941, MGR)
- Everett Fagan (1940–1941)
- Hank Hulvey (1939–1940, MGR)
- Johnny Kucab (1941)
- Walt Masters (1940)

== See also ==
- Harrisonburg Turks players
