= Virginia League (1939–1942) =

- Formerly: Virginia League
- Classification: Class D (1939–1940); Class C (1940–1941)
- Sport: Minor League Baseball
- First season: 1939
- Folded: 1942
- Replaced by: Virginia League (1948-1951)
- President: Ray Ryan (1939–1941); C.R. Williams (1942)
- No. of teams: 7
- Country: United States of America
- Most titles: 1; 1939: Harrisonburg Turks; 1940: Lynchburg Senators; 1941: Salem-Roanoke Friends; 1942: Pulaski Counts

The Virginia League was the name of an American professional minor league baseball league that operated between 1939 and 1942. This was the fourth of five incarnations of the Virginia League. The league was a Class D level league in 1939 and 1940. It became a Class C level league for the 1941 and 1942 seasons. The Virginia League resumed play in 1948, after the conclusion of World War II.

== History ==
After the Virginia League ceased operations following the 1928 season, the league returned to play in 1939 as a four-team Class D level league. The Harrisonburg Turks, Lynchburg Grays, the Salem-Roanoke Friends, and the Staunton Presidents began league play in 1939.

In 1941, two new teams were added: the Newport News Pilots and the Petersburg Rebels.

In 1942, the Turks were replaced in the league by the Pulaski Counts.

The Virginia League returned to play in 1948, following the conclusion of World War II.

== Virginia League 1939–1942 cities represented ==
- Harrisonburg, VA: Harrisonburg Turks 1939–1941
- Lynchburg, VA: Lynchburg Grays 1939; Lynchburg Senators 1940–1942
- Newport News, VA: Newport News Pilots 1941; Newport News Builders 1942
- Petersburg, VA: Petersburg Rebels 1941–1942
- Pulaski, VA: Pulaski Counts 1942
- Salem, VA & Roanoke, VA: Salem-Roanoke Friends 1939–1942
- Staunton, VA: Staunton Presidents 1939–1942

== Standings and statistics ==
1939 Virginia League

Team standings	W	L	PCT	GB	Managers
Harrisonburg Turks	61	47	.565	-	Hank Hulvey
Lynchburg Grays	55	51	.519	5	Al Weisman
Staunton Presidents	51	56	.477	9½	Jimmy Bair
Salem-Roanoke Friends	47	60	.439	13½	Bob Schleicher

Playoff: Lynchburg 1 game, Staunton 0.
Finals: Harrisonburg 3 games, Lynchburg 0.

Player statistics
Player	Team	Stat	Tot	Player	Team	Stat	Tot
Warren Huffman	Staunton	BA	.415	Vincent Polumbo	Salem-Roanoke	W	18
Russ Mincy	Salem-Roanoke	Runs	92	Ernie Utz	Harrisonburg	SO	183
Nicholas Rhabe	Lynch/Harrison	Hits	156	Michael Marko	Staunton	ERA	2.52
Kenneth Moore	Salem-Roanoke	RBI	95	Ernie Utz	Harrisonburg	PCT	.714 15-6
Louis Cipalla	Harrison/Lynch	HR	10	Walter Poland	Staunton	PCT	.714 15-6

1940 Virginia League

Team standings	W	L	PCT	GB	Managers
Lynchburg Senators	70	45	.609	-	Guy Lacy
Harrisonburg Turks	61	56	.521	10	Hank Hulvey
Salem-Roanoke Friends	55	62	.470	16	Eli Harris / Arnold Anderson
Staunton Presidents	46	69	.400	24	Vernon Brandes / John Brennan

Playoff: Harrisonburg 2 games, Salem-Roanoke 1.
Finals: Lynchburg 3 games, Harrisonburg 2.

Player statistics
Player	Team	Stat	Tot	Player	Team	Stat	Tot
Henry Loman	Harrisonburg	BA	.322	Dick Tate	Lynchburg	W	17
Glen Adkins	Harrisonburg	Runs	119	Ed Haswell	Lynchburg	SO	162
Glen Adkins	Harrisonburg	Hits	149	Lewis Utz	Harrisonburg	ERA	2.87
Joe Kruppa	Salem-Roanoke	RBI	91	Dick Tate	Lynchburg	PCT	.739 17-6
Crawford Howard	Lynchburg	HR	16				

1941 Virginia League

Team standings	W	L	PCT	GB	Managers
Petersburg Rebels	66	53	.555	-	Clarence Pickrel / Possum Whitted
Salem-Roanoke Friends	64	55	.538	2	Vernon Mackie
Lynchburg Senators	62	56	.525	3½	Guy Lacy
Harrisonburg Turks	62	56	.525	3½	Vernon Brandes / Vance Dinges
Newport News Pilots	58	58	.500	6½	Chief Bender
Staunton Presidents	42	76	.356	23½	Hank Hulvey / Gus Tebell

Playoffs: Lynchburg 3 games, Petersburg 0; Salem-Roanoke 3 games, Harrisburg 2.
Finals: Salem-Roanoke 3 games, Lynchburg 2.

Player statistics
Player	Team	Stat	Tot	Player	Team	Stat	Tot
Vernon Mackie	Salem-Roanoke	BA	.355	Toy Bowen	Salem-Roanoke	W	17
Royce Watson	Lynchburg	Runs	125	Ed Haswell	Lynchburg	SO	226
Nicholas Rhabe	Peters/Harrison	Hits	164	Don Black	Petersburg	ERA	2.34
Ben Drake	Newport News	RBI	117	Don Black	Petersburg	PCT	.688 11-5
Noel Casbier	Salem-Roanoke	HR	21				

1942 Virginia League

Team standings	W	L	PCT	GB	Managers
Pulaski Counts	79	47	.627	-	Jack Crosswhite
Lynchburg Senators	74	51	.592	4½	Wes Ferrell
Petersburg Rebels	74	52	.587	5	Steve Mizerak
Newport News Builders	62	67	.483	18½	Harry Chozen
Salem-Roanoke Friends	59	69	.461	21	Vernon Mackie
Staunton Presidents	32	94	.254	47	Taylor Sanford

Playoffs: Lynchburg 4 games, Newport News 2; Pulaski 4 games, Petersburg 2.
Finals: Pulaski 4 games, Lynchburg 2.

Player statistics
Player	Team	Stat	Tot	Player	Team	Stat	Tot
Wes Ferrell	Lynchburg	BA	.361	Everett Fagan	Pulaski	W	20
Ray Rudisill	Pulaski	Runs	108	Ed Haswell	Lynchburg	SO	212
James Blair	Petersburg	Hits	167	Ted Garbee	Lynchburg	ERA	1.97
James Blair	Petersburg	RBI	103	Ted Garbee	Lynchburg	PCT	.850 17-3
Wes Ferrell	Lynchburg	HR	31				
