= Covington Papermakers =

- 1914; Covington, Virginia

Minor league affiliations
- Class: Class D (1914)
- League: Virginia Mountain League (1914)

Major league affiliations
- Team: None

Minor league titles
- League titles (1): 1914

Team data
- Name: Covington Papermakers (1914)
- Ballpark: Casey Field (1914)

The Covington Papermakers were a minor league baseball team based in Covington, Virginia. In 1914, the Papermakers played as charter members of the short–lived Class D level Virginia Mountain League, winning the league championship in a shortened season. The Papermakers were succeeded in Covington minor league baseball by the 1966 Covington Red Sox.

== History ==
On March 3, 1914, at a meeting in Lynchburg, Virginia, discussions began for the formulation of a six–team Class D level baseball league in the Virginia region. The league teams were tentatively slated to be based in the Virginia cities of Lynchburg, Danville, Charlottesville, Clifton Forge, Staunton, and Covington, with a salary limit of $800 (per team) monthly. Lynchburg was hesitant to commit because of a previous $700 lien on its territory, a result of a previous team in the Virginia League. The league was then formed at a March 12, 1914, meeting, without Danville and Lynchburg franchises. B.F. Donovan, of Clifton Forge, was elected league president. D. R. Ellis, of Covington, was elected as vice-president.

Minor league baseball began in Covington, Virginia in 1914, when the Covington "Papermakers" became charter members of the four–team Class D level Virginia Mountain League. The Covington Papermakers were joined by the Charlottesville Tuckahoes, Clifton Forge Railroaders and Staunton/Harrisonburg Lunatics in the 1914 league play. The league schedule began play on May 14, 1914.

The Covington, Virginia use of the "Papermakers" moniker corresponds to local industry and manufacturing. Covington is the longtime home to the WestRock Company, which has been operating in the city since 1899, producing paper related products.

On opening day, May 14, 1914, Covington players Krieling and Ellis both hit home runs to lead the Papermakers to a 7–6 win over Clifton Forge. 1,500 fans were in attendance at Covington.

On June 26, 1914, the Covington Papermakers announced that Frank Moore was let go as the team's manager. The move was made as the team was faced with numerous injuries and with a 12–man roster limit, the team directors felt that the franchise could not financially afford a nonplaying manager. Third baseman Nick Carver was named as the new player/manager.

The Covington Papermakers won the 1914 Virginia Mountain League championship in a shortened season. On July 25, 1914, the Papermakers had a record of 37–26 when the Virginia Mountain League permanently folded. Covington was in first place at the time the league folded. Managed by Frank Moore and Nick Carter, the Papermakers finished 5.0 games ahead of the second place Charlottesville Tuckahoes (31–30) in the final standings of the shortened season. They were followed by the Clifton Forge Railroaders (28–34) and Staunton / Harrisonburg Lunatics (26–32) in the 1914 league standings.

The Virginia Mountain League was reported to have folded due to poor attendance amid "rumors of fixed games."

Shortly after the Virginia Mountain League folded, there was an unsuccessful attempt to revive the league and the teams in August, 1914, headed by Buck Hooker, manager of the Clifton Forge Railroaders.

However, following the collapse of the league, the Covington and Clifton Forge teams elected to play a 10–game championship series. The Railroaders captured the unofficial league “title,” winning 7 of the 10 games over Covington. After winning a final doubleheader against Covington by scores of 5–4 and 5–3, a farewell reception and banquet was held for the players at Clifton Forge.

Covington, Virginia was without minor league baseball until 1966. The 1966 Covington Red Sox began play as members of the Appalachian League. Today, the Covington Lumberjacks play as members of the collegiate summer baseball affiliated Valley Baseball League.

== The ballpark ==
The 1914 Covington Papermakers were noted to have played minor league home games at Casey Field. Casey Field was referenced to have likely had another name in the era. The ballpark is still in use today as home to the Covington Lumberjacks, after previously hosting the Covington Red Sox and Covington Astros of the Appalachian League. The ballpark site today is part of a remodeled multipurpose sports facility hosting Covington High School teams. The site is directly across from Covington High School. "Casey Field & Boodie Albert Stadium" are located at 700 West Oak Street, Covington, Virginia.

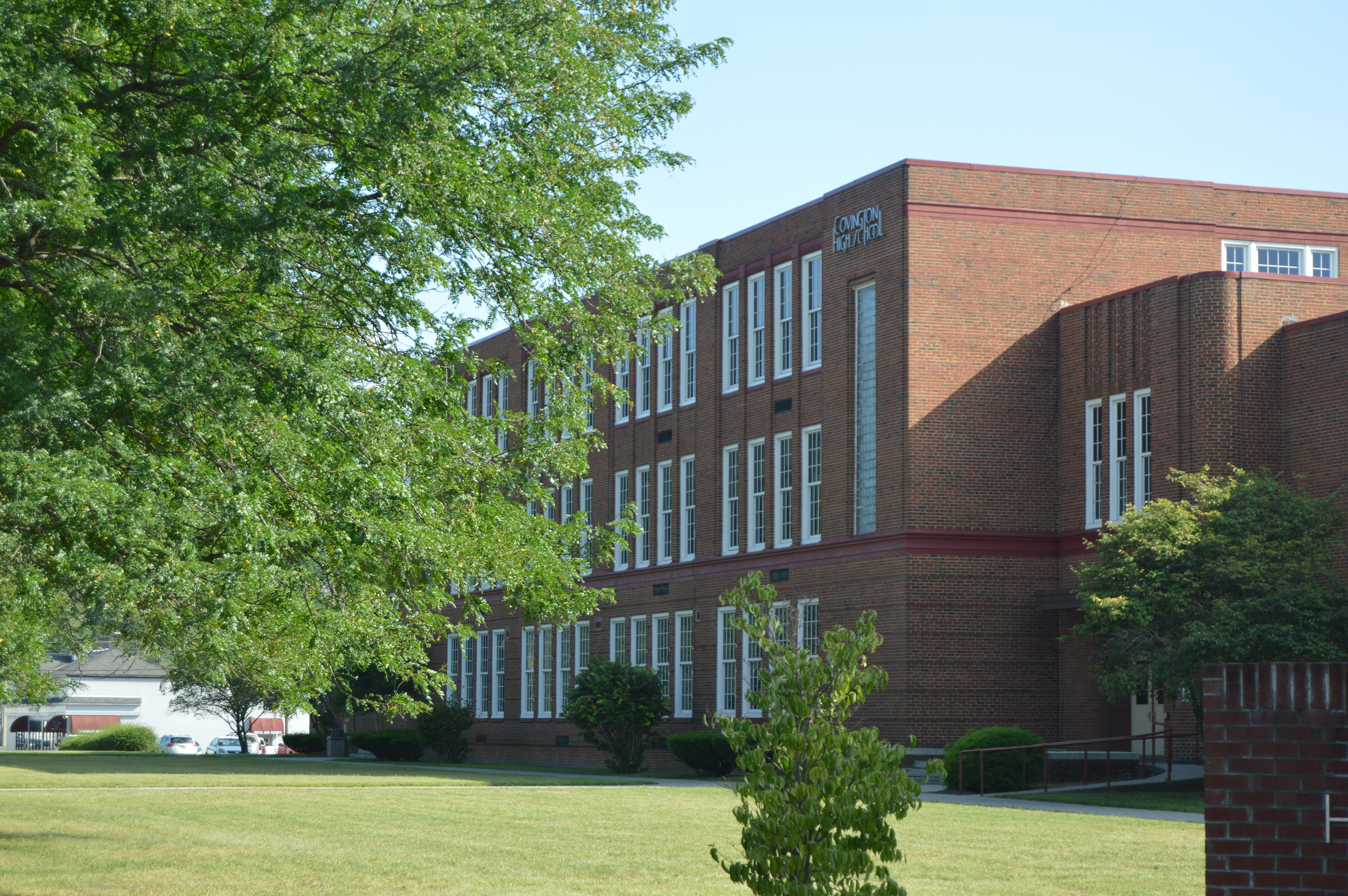
(2016) Covington High School. National Register of Historic Places. Covington, Virginia

== Year–by–year record ==
Year	Record	Finish	Manager	Playoffs/Notes
1914	37–26	1st	Frank Moore / Nick Carter	League folded July 25

== Notable alumni ==
- Frank Moore (1917, MGR)
