= Newport News Pilots =

- 1941–1942; Newport News, Virginia

Minor league affiliations
- Class: Class C (1941–1942)
- League: Virginia League (1941–1942)

Major league affiliations
- Team: Philadelphia Athletics

Minor league titles
- League titles (0): None
- Wild card berths (1): 1941

Team data
- Name: Newport News Pilots (1941); Newport News Builders (1942)
- Ballpark: Shipbuilders Park (1941–1942)

The Newport News Pilots were a minor league baseball team based in Newport News, Virginia. In 1941 and 1942, as a minor league affiliate of the Philadelphia Athletics, Newport News played as members of the Class C level Virginia League, playing as the Newport News Builders in 1942. The teams hosted minor league home games at Shipbuilders Park.

Baseball Hall of Fame member Chief Bender managed the 1941 Pilots.

== History ==
After minor league baseball began in Newport News with the 1894 Newport News-Hampton Deckhands of the Virginia League, the Pilots were immediately preceded by the 1922 Newport News Shipbuilders, who ended an 11-consecutive season tenure as members of the Virginia League.

The 1941 Virginia League expanded to six teams and became a Class C level league, adding the Newport News Pilots and Petersburg Rebels franchises. The Pilots and Rebels were joined by the Harrisonburg Turks, Lynchburg Senators, Salem-Roanoke Friends and Staunton Presidents in beginning league play on May 2, 1941.

In their first season of play, the Newport News "Pilots" were an affiliate of the Philadelphia Athletics and ended the 1941 season in fifth place with a record of 58–58. The Pilots were managed by Baseball Hall of Fame member Chief Bender, finishing 6½ games behind the first place Petersburg Rebels in the final regular season standings. Newport News did not qualify for the playoffs, won by the Salem-Roanoke Friends.

In 1942, the Newport News "Builders" continued play as a Philadelphia Athletics affiliate and qualified for the Virginia League playoffs. The Builders ended the Virginia League regular season with a 62–67 record to place fourth in the six–team league with Harry Chozen managing the team. Newport News finished 18½ games behind the first place Pulaski Counts in the regular season standings. In the 1st round of the playoffs, the Lynchburg Senators defeated Newport News Builders 4 games to 2 to advance to the finals, won by Pulaski. The Virginia League folded after the 1942 season with the onset of World War II.

In 1944, Newport News next hosted the Newport News Dodgers, who began play as members of the Class B level Piedmont League.

== The ballpark ==
The Newport News Pilots and Newport News Builders hosted home games at Shipbuilders Park, also nicknamed "Builders Park." The ballpark was located on Virginia Avenue, called Warwick Boulevard today.

== Timeline ==
Year(s)	# Yrs.	Team	Level	League	Affiliate	Ballpark
1941	1	Newport News Pilots	Class C	Philadelphia Athletics	Virginia League	Shipbuilders Park
1942	1	Newport News Builders	Class C	Philadelphia Athletics	Virginia League	Shipbuilders Park

== Year–by–year records ==
Year	Record	Finish	Manager	Playoffs/Notes
1941	42–76	6th	Chief Bender	Did not qualify
1942	62–67	4th	Harry Chozen	Lost in 1st round

== Notable alumni ==
- Chief Bender (1941, MGR) Inducted Baseball Hall of Fame, 1953
- Dick Adkins (1941)
- Bill Burgo (1942)
- Harry Chozen (1942, MGR)
- Joe Coleman (1941)
- Lou Knerr (1941)
- John Leovich (1941)
- Joe Rullo (1941)
- Frank Seward (1942)

== See also ==
Newport News Pilots players
Newport News Builders players
