= Covington Red Sox =

- 1966; Covington, Virginia

Minor league affiliations
- Class: Rookie (1966)
- League: Appalachian League (1966)

Major league affiliations
- Team: Boston Red Sox

Minor league titles
- League titles (0): None

Team data
- Name: Covington Red Sox (1966)
- Ballpark: Casey Field (1966)

The Covington Red Sox were a minor league baseball team based in Covington, Virginia. In 1966, the Covington Red Sox played as members of the Rookie level Appalachian League, placing fourth in their only season of play, while hosting home games at Casey Field. The Red Sox were succeeded in Covington minor league baseball by the 1967 Covington Astros.

== History ==
Minor league baseball began in Covington, Virginia, when the 1914 Covington Papermakers became charter members of the four–team Class D level Virginia Mountain League, winning the league championship in their only season of play. Covington was without minor league play until 1966.

The 1966 Covington Red Sox became members of the five–team Rookie level Appalachian League, playing as a minor league affiliate of the Boston Red Sox. The Bluefield Orioles, Johnson City Yankees, Marion Mets and Salem Pirates joined Covington in beginning league play on June 24, 1966.

Covington placed fourth in the final 1966 Appalachian League standings, playing the season under manager Rac Slider. For the season, the Red Sox scored 378 total runs and allowed 411 runs, most in the league, with a 5.79 team ERA. In the final standings, the Red Sox compiled a 28–43 record, finishing 16.0 games behind the 1st place Marion Mets. Covington players Steve Blateric, Dick Mills and Mike Nagy advanced to play in the major leagues.

The Covington Red Sox were succeeded in the 1967 Appalachian League by the Covington Astros, as Covington became an affiliate of the Houston Astros following the 1966 season. Today, the Covington Lumberjacks play as members of the collegiate summer baseball affiliated Valley Baseball League.

== The ballpark ==
The 1966 Covington Red Sox hosted minor league home games at Casey Field. The ballpark is still in use today as home to the collegiate summer baseball Covington Lumberjacks, after previously hosting the Covington Papermakers and Covington Astros minor league teams. Today, the ballpark site is part of a remodeled multipurpose sports facility hosting Covington High School teams. The site is directly across from Covington High School, where "Casey Field & Boodie Albert Stadium" are located at 700 West Oak Street, Covington, Virginia.

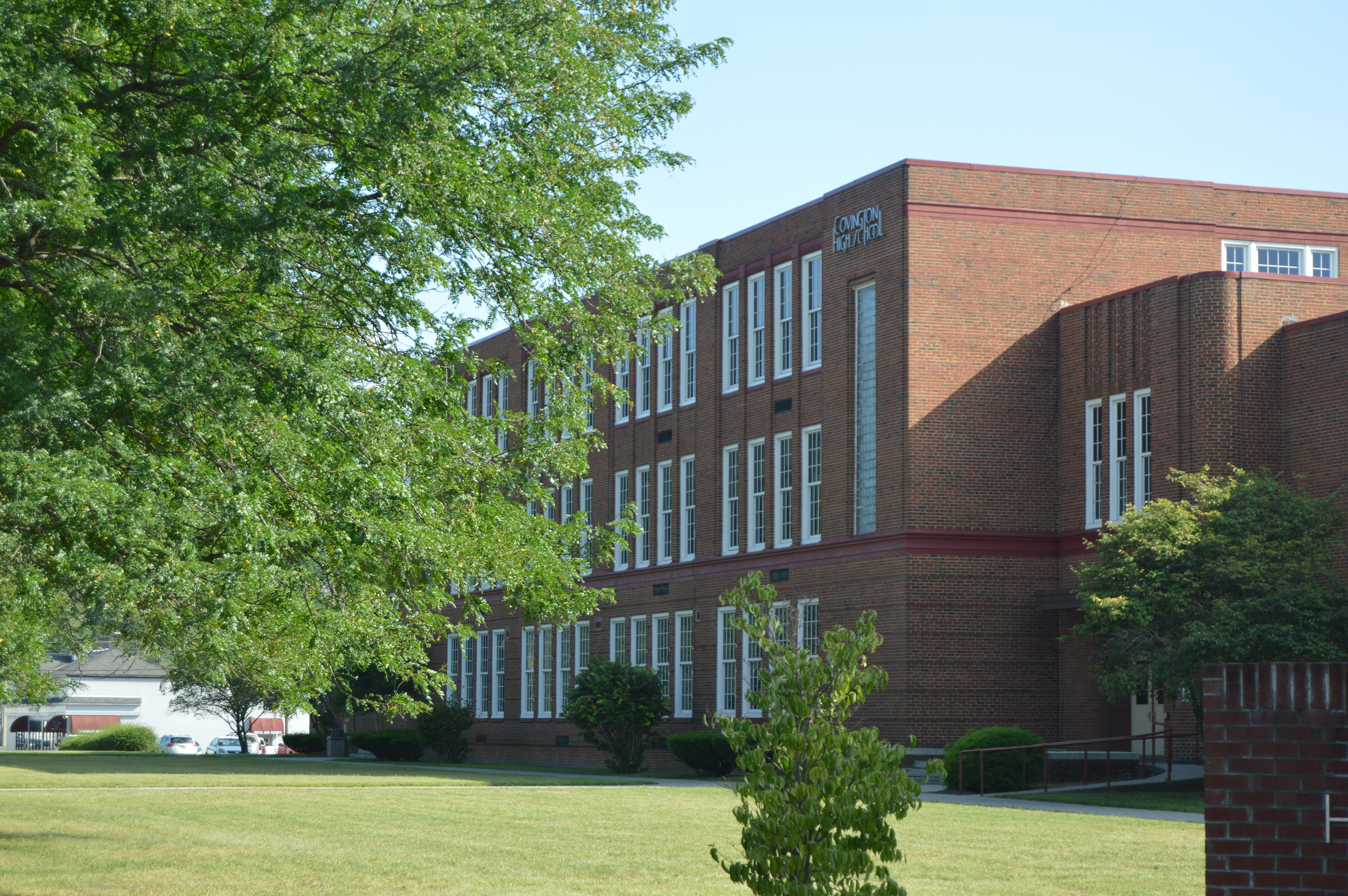
(2016) Covington High School. National Register of Historic Places. Covington, Virginia

== Year–by–year record ==
Year	Record	Finish	Manager	Attendance	Playoffs
1966	28–43	4th	Rac Slider	34,622	No playoffs held

== Notable alumni ==
- Steve Blateric 1966
- Dick Mills 1966
- Mike Nagy 1966
- Rac Slider 1966, MGR
- Covington Red Sox players
