= Charlottesville Tuckahoes =

- 1914; Charlottesville, Virginia

Minor league affiliations
- Class: Class D (1914)
- League: Virginia Mountain League (1914)

Major league affiliations
- Team: None

Minor league titles
- League titles (0): none
- Conference titles (1): 1914

Team data
- Name: Charlottesville Tuckahoes (1914)
- Ballpark: Unknown (1914)

The Charlottesville Tuckahoes were a minor league baseball team based in Charlottesville, Virginia. In 1914, the Tuckahoes played as charter members of the short–lived Class D level Virginia Mountain League, winning the second–half title in the league.

== History ==
On March 3, 1914, at a meeting in Lynchburg, Virginia, discussions began for the formulation of a six–team Class D level baseball league in the Virginia region. The league teams were tentatively slated to be based in the Virginia cities of Lynchburg, Danville, Charlottesville, Clifton Forge, Staunton and Covington, with a salary limit of $800 (per team) monthly. Lynchburg was hesitant to commit because of a previous $700 lien on its territory, a result of a previous team in the Virginia League. The league was then formed at a March 12, 1914, meeting, without Danville and Lynchburg franchises. B.F. Donovan, of Clifton Forge, was elected league president. D. R. Ellis, of Covington, was elected as vice–president.

Minor league baseball began in Charlottesville, Virginia in 1914, when the Charlottesville "Tuckahoes" became charter members of the four–team Class D level Virginia Mountain League. The Tuckahoes were joined by the Clifton Forge Railroaders, Covington Papermakers and Staunton/Harrisonburg Lunatics in the 1914 league play. The league schedule began play on May 14, 1914.

The use of the "Tuckahoes" nickname has multiple correlations to the region. A "tuckahoe" was a disparaging term used in the 19th century to describe slave–owning plantation owners. A Tuckahoe was also a Native American word referring to plant species. The Tuckahoe plantation, a childhood home of President Thomas Jefferson, is located in the region.

Playing at home on opening day, May 14, 1914, Charlottesville defeated the Staunton Lunatics 10–4. Pitcher Frank Dye pitched a complete game victory for Charlottesville.

Charlottesville placed second in the 1914 Virginia Mountain League overall standings in a shortened season. On July 25, 1914, Charlottesville had a record of 31–30 when the Virginia Mountain League permanently folded. Covington was in first place at the time the league folded. Led by player/manager Walter Steinhause, Charlottesville finished 5.0 games behind the first place Covington Papermakers (37–26) in the final standings of the shortened season. They were followed by the third place Clifton Forge Railroaders (28–34) and fourth place Staunton / Harrisonburg Lunatics (26–32) in the 1914 league standings. Charlottesville was credited with winning the second–half title of a split–season.

The Virginia Mountain League was reported to have folded due to poor attendance and the onset of World War I amid "rumors of fixed games."

Shortly after the Virginia Mountain League folded, there was an unsuccessful attempt to revive the league and the teams in August, 1914, headed by Buck Hooker, manager of the Clifton Forge Railroaders.

Following the collapse of the league, the Covington and Clifton Forge teams elected to play a 10–game championship series. Charlottesville did not return to play. The Railroaders captured the unofficial league “title,” winning 7 of the 10 games over Covington.

In 1995, Charlottesville was named to field a charter franchise in the Atlantic League of Professional Baseball on the condition that a 6,000 seat new ballpark be constructed in time to begin play in the 1997 season. The cost of the new stadium was $6.0 million and the Charlottesville franchise was also in talks with the University of Virginia to use and upgrade their ballpark, with a policy of no alcohol sales on campus. The Charlottesville franchise did not materialize for Atlantic League of Professional Baseball play.

Charlottesville, Virginia has not hosted another minor league team. Today, the Charlottesville Tom Sox play as members of the collegiate summer baseball affiliated Valley Baseball League, having joined the league in 2015.

== The ballpark ==
The name of the home minor league ballpark for Charlottesville in 1914 is not known.

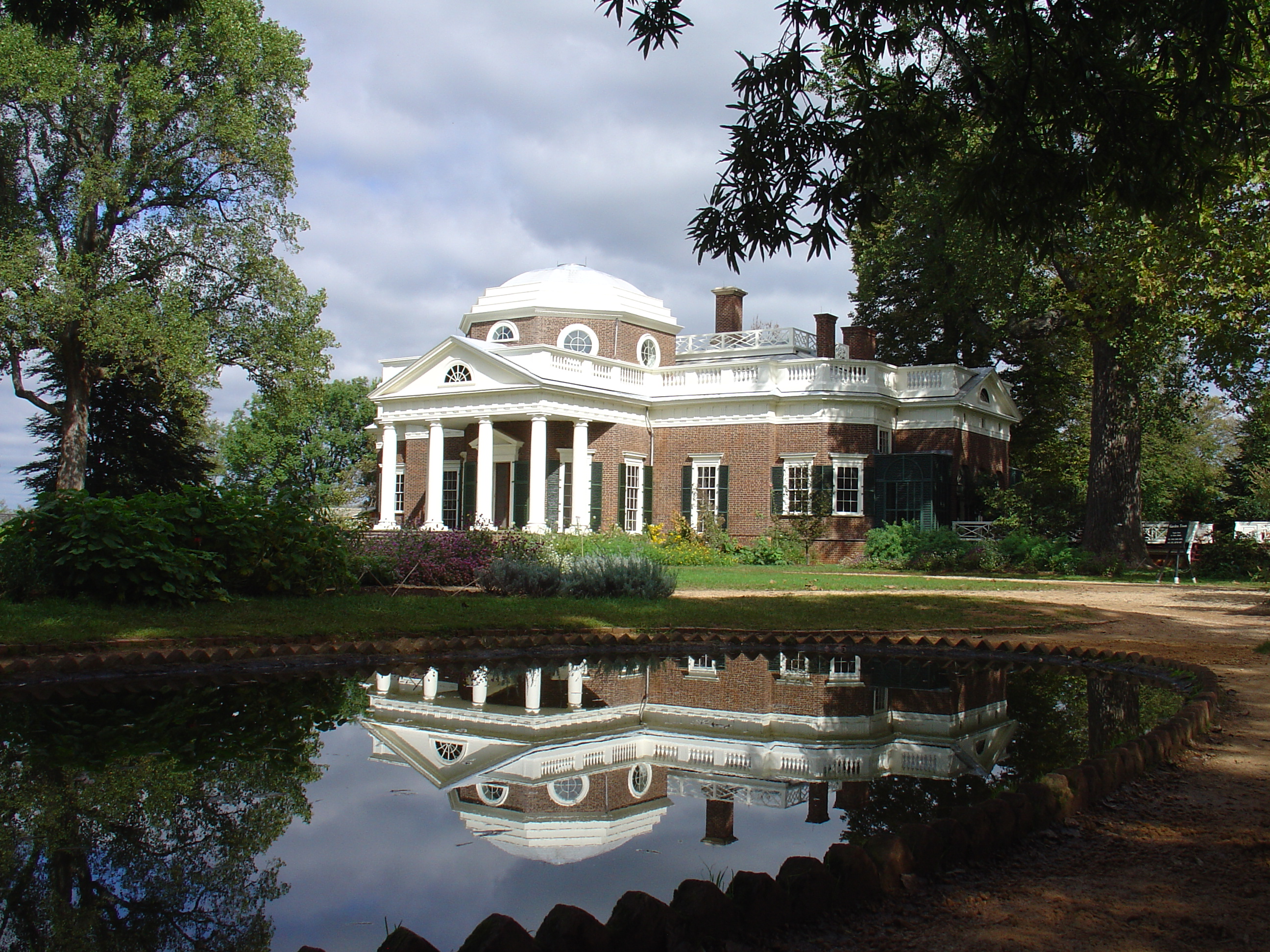
(2005) Monticello. Home of President Thomas Jefferson. Charlottesville, Virginia

== Year–by–year record ==
Year	Record	Finish	Manager	Playoffs/Notes
1914	31–30	2nd	Walter Steinhause	League folded July 25

== Notable alumni ==
No alumni of the 1914 Charlottesville minor league team reached the major leagues.
