= Covington Astros =

Minor league baseball team

The Covington Astros were a minor league baseball team that played from 1967 to 1976 in the Appalachian League. Affiliated with the Houston Astros, they were located in Covington, Virginia. They played their home games at Casey Field. In 1966, the team played as the Covington Red Sox and were a farm team of the Boston Red Sox.

== Year-by-year record ==
Year	Record	Finish	Manager	Playoffs
1967	29-35	4th	Tony Pacheco	none
1968	39-32	2nd	Tony Pacheco	none
1969	32-35	6th	Dick Bogard	none
1970	32-24	2nd	Dick Smith	none
1971	33-35	5th (t)	Billy Smith	none
1972	41-29	2nd	Billy Smith	none
1973	21-48	8th	Billy Smith	none
1974	32-37	5th	Billy Smith	none
1975	35-34	5th	Billy Smith	none
1976	38-32	3rd	Julio Linares	none

== Notable alumni ==
- Bob Bourne (1972) NHL player 1974-1988
- Bruce Bochy (1975) 1996 NL Manager of the Year; Manager: 2010, 2012, 2014 World Series Champions - San Francisco Giants
- Cesar Cedeno (1968) 4 x MLB All-Star
- Mike Easler (1969) MLB All-Star
- Clark Gillies (1970-1972) Hockey Hall of Fame 2002 inductee
- Greg Gross (1970)
- Cliff Johnson (1967)
- John Milner (1968)
- John Mayberry (1967) 2 x MLB All-Star
- Terry Puhl (1974) MLB All-Star
- Luis Pujols (1974)
- J.R. Richard (1969) MLB All-Star; 1979 NL ERA Leader
- Joe Sambito (1973) MLB All-Star
