= Julio Linares (baseball) =

- Coach
- Born: 26 December 1941 (age 84); San Pedro de Macorís, Dominican Republic
- Bats: Right Throws: Right
- Stats at Baseball Reference

Teams
- As coach: Houston Astros (1994–1996)

Julio Mairini Linares Rijo (born 26 December 1941) is the special advisor, Latin American player development, for the Houston Astros of Major League Baseball and a former player, coach, scout, and manager in the professional ranks.

Born in San Pedro de Macorís in the Dominican Republic, Linares spent most of his uniformed career at the minor league level; however, he served in the Majors for three seasons (1994–96) as an Astros' coach.

As a player, Linares was a 5 ft 9 in (1.75 m), 165 lb (75 kg) second baseman and shortstop who threw and batted right-handed. He first played professional baseball at age 15 in 1957, when he appeared in two games with the Tucson Cowboys of the Class C Arizona–Texas League. He was on the roster of the Salinas Packers of the Class C California League in 1958, but did not play. He then spent 1959 out of baseball until he signed with the San Francisco Giants' organization in 1960, where he played 13 seasons, including four at the Triple-A level, but was never summoned to the Majors.

After his retirement as a player following the 1972 season, Linares joined the Astros as a minor-league coach, manager and instructor. He managed at the Rookie-league level for 13 years (1976–79; 1985–86; 1989–93; 1997–98) with the Covington Astros and the Gulf Coast Astros, scouted in 1987–88, and also served as a roving infield instructor in the Astro farm system. In 1994, he was promoted to serve as a coach on the Major League staff of Houston manager Terry Collins, and stayed through 1996 before returning to the helm of the GCL Astros. From 1999 through 2004, he worked as the Astros' director of operations in the Dominican Republic, before his promotion to assistant to the general manager/Dominican Operations in 2005. His son Rodney, a longtime minor league manager in the Houston organization, has been a coach for the Tampa Bay Rays of Major League Baseball since 2019.
