= Juan Pierre =

American baseball player (born 1977)

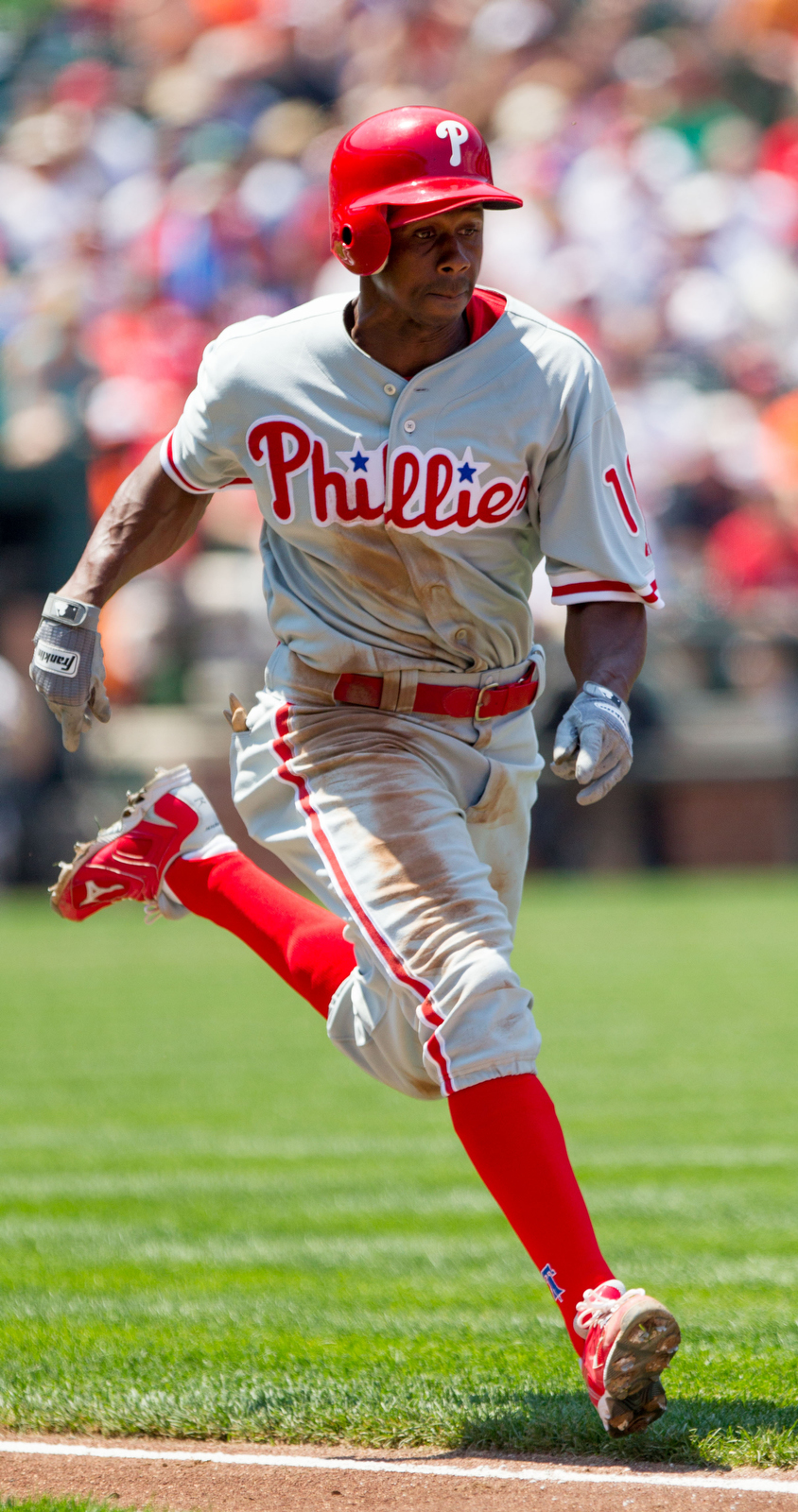
- Pierre with the Philadelphia Phillies in 2012
- Outfielder
- Born: August 14, 1977 (age 49); Mobile, Alabama, U.S.
- Batted: Left Threw: Left

MLB debut
- August 7, 2000, for the Colorado Rockies

Last MLB appearance
- September 29, 2013, for the Miami Marlins

MLB statistics
- Batting average: .295
- Hits: 2,217
- Home runs: 18
- Runs batted in: 517
- Stolen bases: 614
- Stats at Baseball Reference

Teams
- Colorado Rockies (2000–2002); Florida Marlins (2003–2005); Chicago Cubs (2006); Los Angeles Dodgers (2007–2009); Chicago White Sox (2010–2011); Philadelphia Phillies (2012); Miami Marlins (2013)

Career highlights and awards
- World Series champion (2003); 3× Stolen base leader (2001, 2003, 2010)

Juan D'Vaughn Pierre (born August 14, 1977) is an American former professional baseball outfielder. He played in Major League Baseball (MLB) from 2000–2013 for the Colorado Rockies, Florida/Miami Marlins, Chicago Cubs, Los Angeles Dodgers, Chicago White Sox, and Philadelphia Phillies. Known for his speed, he stole 614 bases in his career, the 18th-most in MLB history at the time of his retirement, and the most since 2000.

In 1,994 games over 14 seasons, Pierre posted a .295 batting average, with 2,217 hits (the most by a non-All-Star), 1075 runs, 255 doubles, 94 triples, 18 home runs, 517 RBI, 614 stolen bases, 464 bases on balls, .343 on-base percentage and .361 slugging percentage. His 205 bunt hits are the second most all-time. He finished his career with a .990 fielding percentage playing at center and left field. In 26 postseason games, he hit .304 (24-for-79), with 16 runs, five doubles, two triples, seven RBI, three stolen bases and eight walks. He led the league in hits twice, stolen bases three times, and triples once. He also led the league in games played five times.

In retrospective rankings published by MLB.com, Pierre was named the best center fielder in Marlins franchise history and fifth all-time among Rockies center fielders.

Throughout his career, he wore a cap underneath his helmet while batting and baserunning. Pierre is often recognized as the last player to do so, as it went out of style when the league added earflaps to helmets in the 1960s.

== Personal life ==
He was born in Mobile, Alabama, to Derry and James. Soon after his birth, his family moved to Alexandria, Louisiana. The Pierre family have been deeply rooted in Louisiana since colonial times and are of Creole heritage. Juan was named after Dominican Hall of Fame pitcher and former Giants player Juan Marichal, his father's favorite player, who also gave him his middle name, D'Vaughn, because he said it had a "good rhyme to it." He attended Alexandria Senior High School, where he played baseball, basketball, and was the salutatorian of his graduating class.

He has four sons Joshua, Jonathan, Jacob and Jairus, with his wife Liz.

He was mentioned in the song "Déjà Vu" by Beyonce and Jay-Z in the line "I used to run base like Juan Pierre."

== Amateur career ==
In 1996, he played summer league baseball for the Manitowoc Skunks of the Northwoods League. He led the league with a .360 batting average. Pierre was the second Northwoods League alum to play in MLB. In 1997, he played summer league baseball for the Harrisonburg Turks of the Valley Baseball League.

He played college baseball at Galveston College in 1997 and the University of South Alabama in 1998. With the South Alabama Jaguars, Pierre was the Sun Belt Conference Player of the Year, leading the league in stolen bases (54), runs (77), and hits. The Jaguars finished the season with a 42-19 record and won the Sun Belt regular-season championship. He was later inducted into the South Alabama Athletic Hall of Fame.

== Professional career ==
=== Draft ===
Pierre was drafted twice by the Seattle Mariners, in 1995 and 1996, before signing with the Colorado Rockies, who drafted him in the 13th round of the 1998 MLB draft.

=== Minor leagues ===
He began his professional career in 1998 with the Portland Rockies of the Northwest League. He won the league batting and stolen base titles in his first professional season. Pierre moved on to the Asheville Tourists in 1999, again batting well over .300 and began 2000 with the Carolina Mudcats before finishing the year in Colorado.

=== Colorado Rockies ===
Pierre made his major league debut on August 7, 2000, as a pinch runner for the Rockies against the Pittsburgh Pirates. He made his first start in center field the following day and got his first hit in the first inning off José Silva. He appeared in 51 games in 2000, hitting .310 with 20 RBIs and 7 stolen bases. Pierre received a single vote in 2000 National League Rookie of the Year voting, tying him for sixth place with Lance Berkman and Chuck Smith.

In 2001, Pierre became the Rockies primary starter in center field, appearing in 156 games, 140 of which were starts, hitting .327 with 2 home runs and 55 RBIs. He led the NL in both stolen bases (46) and caught stealing (17), and his 202 hits were second behind the San Francisco Giants' Rich Aurilia.

Prior to the start of the 2002 season, Pierre signed a 4-year, $7.5 million contract extension, which kept him signed through the 2005 season. In the 2002 season, Pierre was once again the starter in center field, appearing in 152 games, starting 133 of them, and hit .287 with 1 home run and 35 RBIs. His 47 stolen bases and 144 singles both ranked 2nd in the NL, trailing only the Marlins' Luis Castillo in both categories.

He has the best strikeout percentage of any Rockies player all-time (6.2%) and holds the single-season record for singles (163 in 2001).

=== Florida Marlins ===
On November 16, 2002, Pierre was traded along with Mike Hampton and cash to the Florida Marlins for Charles Johnson, Preston Wilson, Vic Darensbourg, and Pablo Ozuna.

In the 2003 regular season, Pierre posted a .305 batting average, led the NL in games played (162), at-bats (668), sacrifice hits (15), stolen bases (65), which is also a Marlins single-season record, and he led the majors with the lowest strikeout percentage (5.2%). During the postseason, he was a major contributor to the Marlins' 2003 World Series championship. He batted .333 in the World Series and .301 overall in his first playoff experience. Pierre received thirty-nine votes in 2003 National League MVP voting, finishing in tenth place.

In 2004, he led the National League in at-bats (678), hits (221), triples (12), games played (162), bunt hits (24), infield hits (38) and strikeout percentage (5.2%). He set Marlins single-season records for at bats, hits, triples, singles (184) and multi-hit games (70). At one point he went 147 plate appearances without striking out, the third best streak since the start of the expansion era. In addition, he was the only major league player to play every inning of each of his team's games, being the last player to do so as of 2023. Pierre received nine votes in 2004 National League MVP voting, tying him for sixteenth place with Todd Helton.

In 2005, Pierre led the National League in games played (162) and had the third-lowest strikeout percentage in baseball (6.9%).

=== Chicago Cubs ===
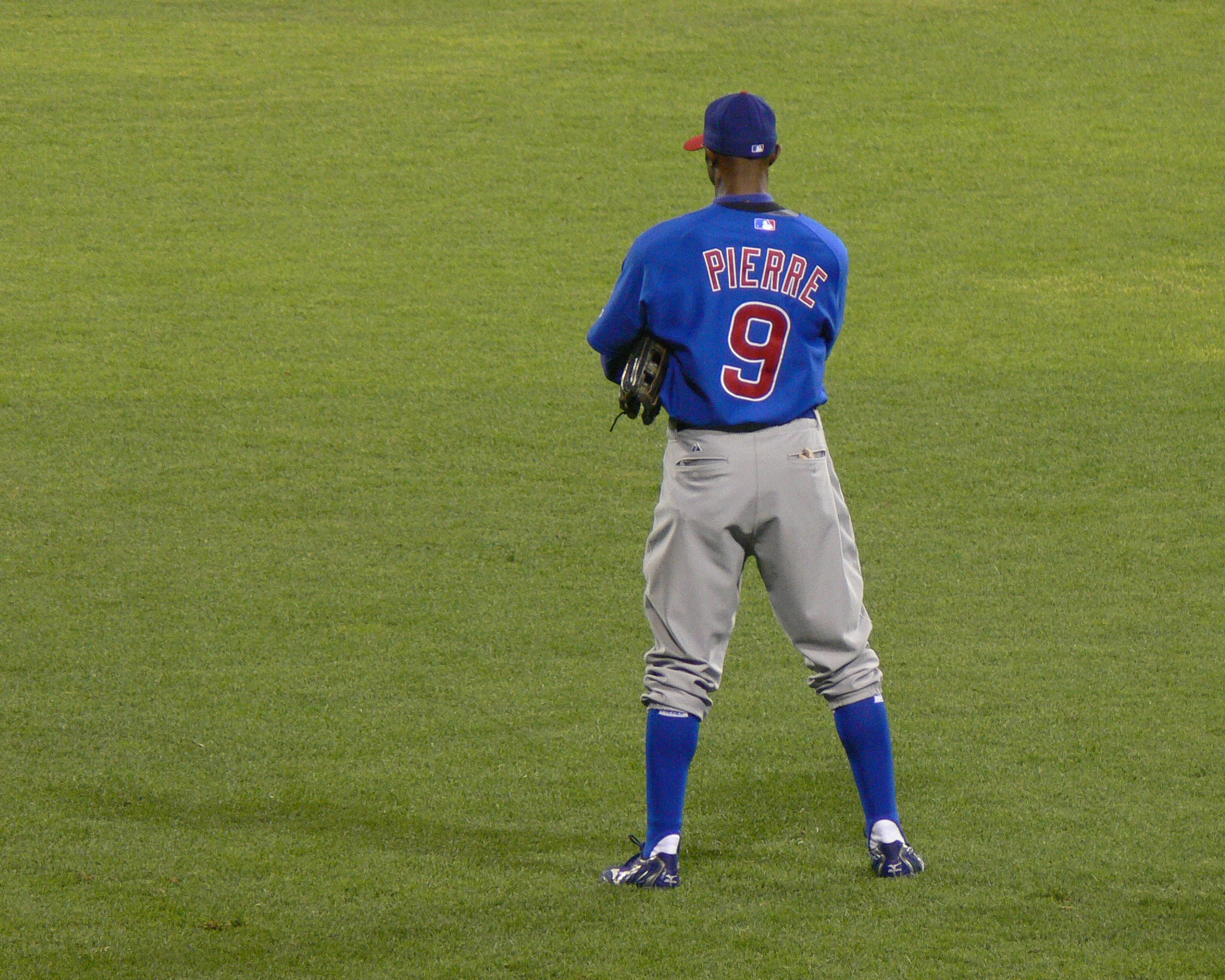
Pierre playing for the Chicago Cubs in 2006

On December 7, 2005, the Marlins traded Pierre to the Chicago Cubs, receiving pitchers Sergio Mitre, Ricky Nolasco, and Renyel Pinto in exchange. The deal was motivated by the Marlins' need to cut payroll after being unable to secure a new stadium deal in South Florida. In January 2006, Pierre agreed to a 1-year, $5.75 million contract to avoid arbitration, despite the Cubs efforts to reach a long-term deal with him, meaning he would be a free agent following the season.

In 2006, while batting .292, Pierre led the NL with 204 hits, winning his second hit title and becoming one of three players in MLB history to record 200 hits in a single-season with three different teams. He also led the NL in at-bats (699), games played (162), bunt hits (21), infield hits (30), and lowest strikeout percentage (5.4%). He tied for the major league lead in times reached base on an error (13). Additionally, he had a fielding percentage of 1.000 and led the major leagues in outs made (532), the second-highest out total for a player since 1982.

=== Los Angeles Dodgers ===
On November 22, 2006, Pierre signed a five-year, $44 million contract with the Los Angeles Dodgers.

In 2007, Pierre led the majors in bunt hits (19). He also led the NL in games played (162) for the fifth straight year, led the NL in singles (164) for the second straight year, led the league in sacrifice hits (20), and had the lowest strikeout percentage in the NL (5.5%). He was second in the NL in stolen bases (64), third in at bats (668) and plate appearances (729), fourth in hits (196), and ninth in triples (8). He is the only player in MLB history with 196 or more hits in a single-season with four different teams.

He appeared in 821 consecutive games from 2002 to 2007, but on June 3, 2005, he was used solely as a pinch runner. Under Rule 10.23(c), this resulted in separate games-played streaks of 386 and 434 games.

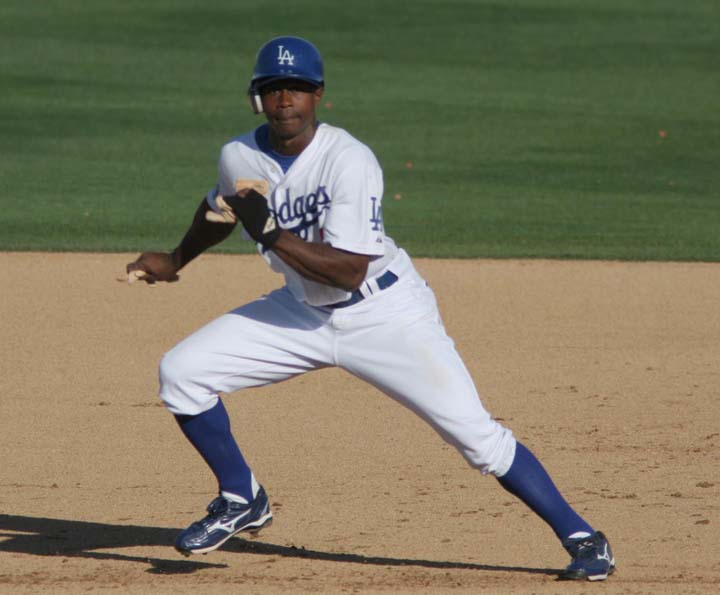
Pierre with the Dodgers in 2008 spring training

Going into 2008, the Dodgers signed Andruw Jones to a two-year contract to play center field. Because of this, Pierre shifted to left field. After a trip to the DL in July, Pierre was moved into a platoon in center field with the struggling Jones. When the Dodgers traded for Manny Ramirez, Pierre moved to the bench and saw limited action, primarily as a pinch runner the rest of the season.

After nearly two years without hitting a home run, Pierre hit a ball into the right field seats at PNC Park in Pittsburgh on September 15, 2008. It was Pierre's first traditional fly-ball home run since August 28, 2006, also in Pittsburgh. On July 29, 2008, Pierre stole his 100th base with the Dodgers, becoming only one of four players in MLB history to steal at least 100 bases with three different teams. He previously stole 100 with the Colorado Rockies and 167 with the Florida Marlins. Tommy Harper, Brett Butler, and Otis Nixon are the only others to have accomplished this feat.

Prior to the start of the 2009 season, the Dodgers gave Pierre and his agent permission to talk to other teams in hopes of working out a trade because Ramirez's re-signing with the Dodgers pushed Pierre to the backup role in left field. Pierre tied former Dodgers player Steve Sax on the top 50 career MLB stolen base leaders list with 444 on June 12, 2009, against the Texas Rangers in Arlington. The next day, June 13, he pushed Sax out of the top 50 with his 445th steal, again versus the Rangers in Arlington.

When Manny Ramirez received a 50-game suspension, Pierre once more became the Dodgers' regular left fielder. During Ramirez's suspension, Pierre delivered a stellar performance that drew praise from fans and critics alike. However, once Ramirez returned, he resumed his previous role of a backup player. In recognition of his hard work, Dodgers fans gave him a standing ovation on July 16− the same game where Ramirez had his first home game since returning from suspension.

=== Chicago White Sox ===
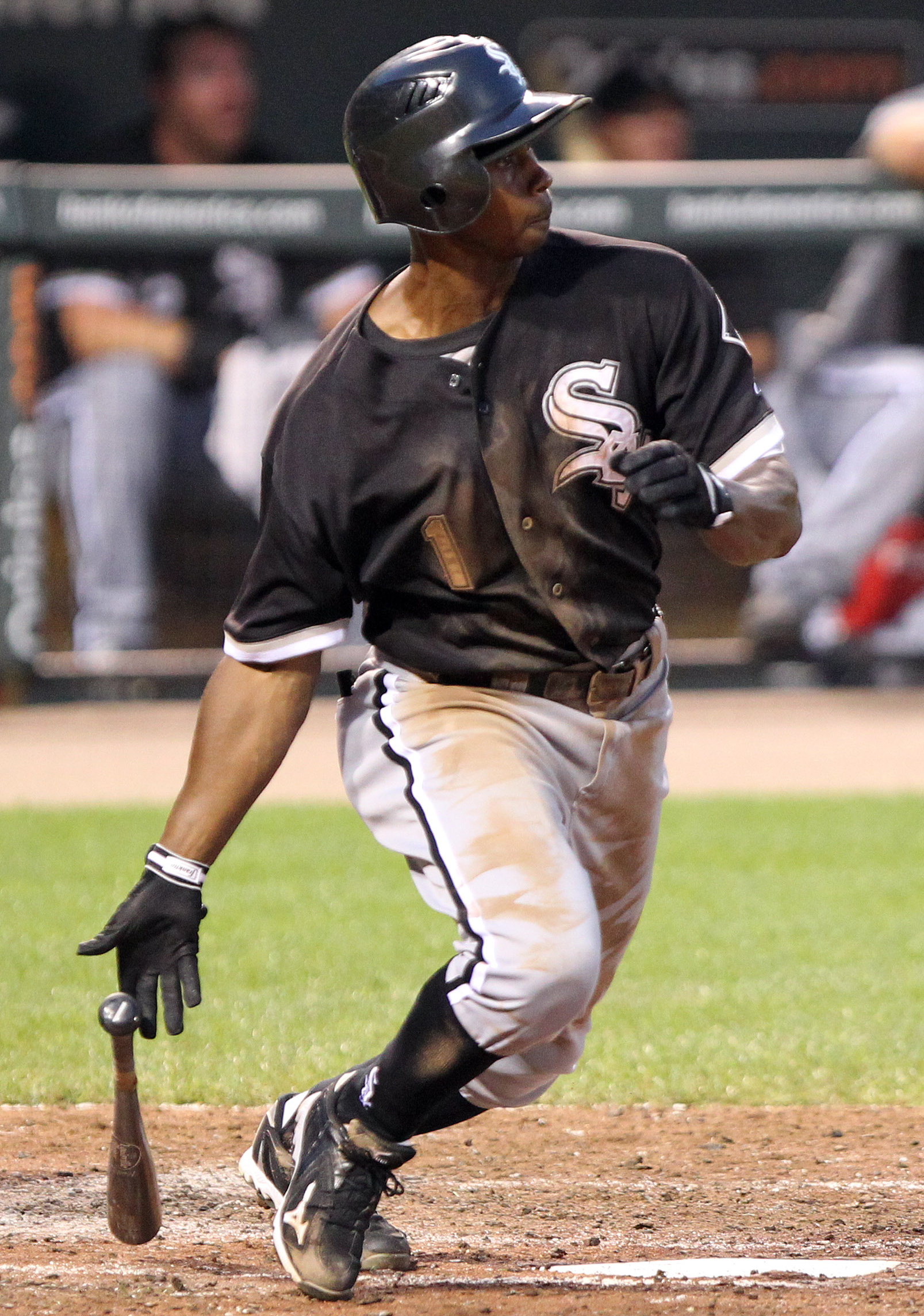
Pierre batting for the Chicago White Sox in 2011

On December 15, 2009, Pierre was traded to the Chicago White Sox for two minor league pitching prospects to be named later (Jon Link and John Ely). Pierre led Major League Baseball with a career-high 68 stolen bases in 2010, the second-most in a single season in franchise history after only Rudy Law's 77 in 1983. On August 3, he hit his first and only home run of the season off Rick Porcello. On August 5, he stole his 500th career base against the Detroit Tigers.

In 2011, Pierre led the major leagues in sacrifice hits (19) and at bats per strikeout (15.6), and he was caught stealing a major-league-leading 17 times (while stealing 27 bases). On defense, he tied for the major league lead in errors by a left fielder, with seven. He was the White Sox 2011 nominee for the Heart & Hustle Award.

=== Philadelphia Phillies ===
On January 27, 2012, Pierre signed a minor league contract with the Philadelphia Phillies. The Phillies purchased his contract on March 29, and he was subsequently added to their opening day roster. On June 28, he got his 500th career RBI. On August 12, he recorded a walk-off infield hit in the 11th inning vs. the Cardinals. It was his sixth and final career walk-off, all of which were singles. In 130 games — 98 starting in left field — Pierre hit .307/.351/.371 with six triples and 37 stolen bases.

=== Miami Marlins ===
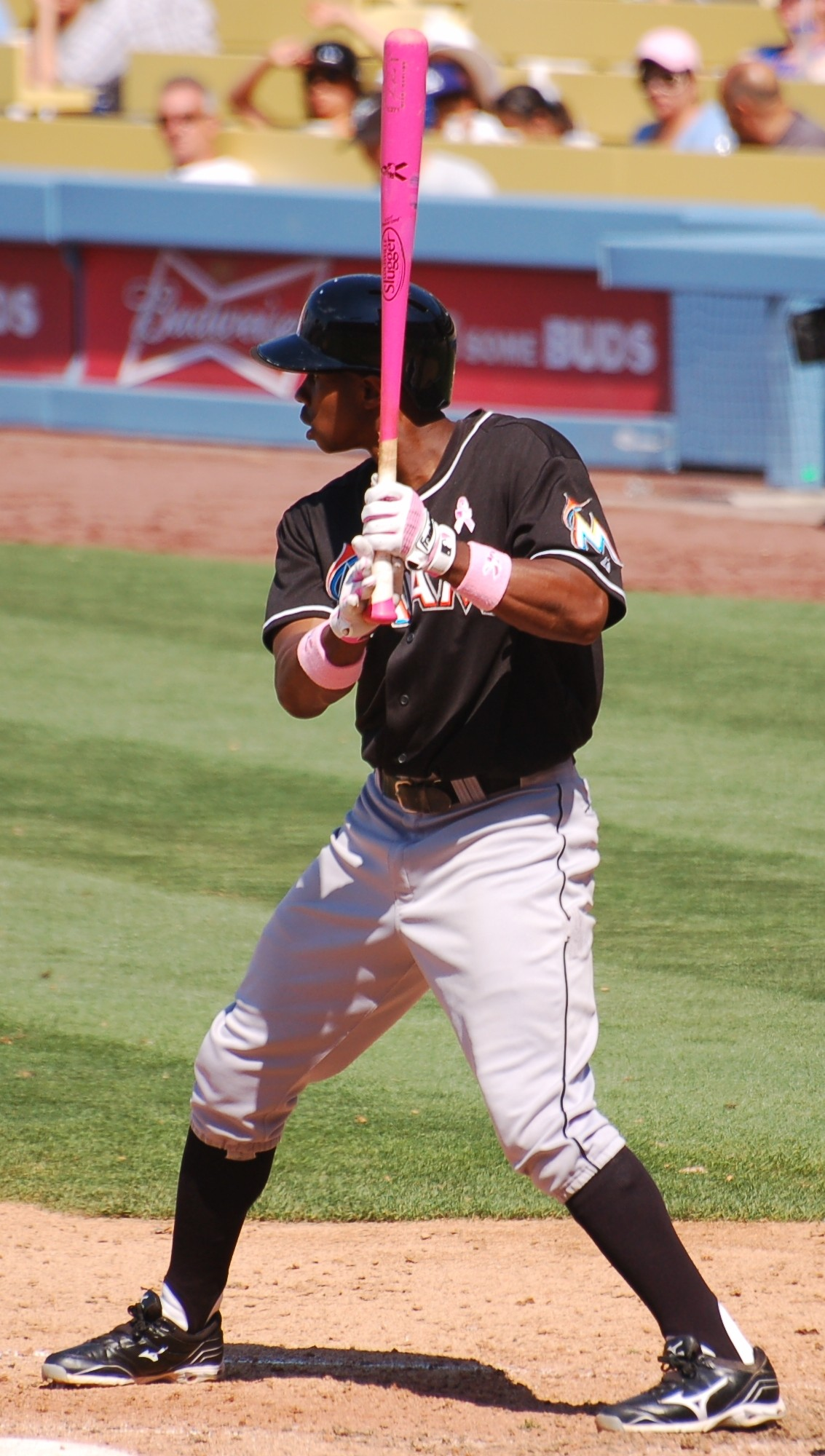
Pierre batting for the Miami Marlins in 2013

On November 17, 2012, Pierre signed a one-year, $1.6 million deal with the Miami Marlins. He played the 2013 season with Miami and stole 23 bases, bringing his career total with the Marlins to 190, which is third all-time in team history. He was the Marlins 2013 nominee for the Heart & Hustle Award. Pierre became a free agent at the end of the season.

=== Retirement ===
He had hoped to sign with another team and was often mentioned in press reports about teams requiring depth in the outfield to cover for injured or under-performing players. However, he went unsigned for the entire season and announced his retirement from professional baseball on February 27, 2015.

In 2017, Pierre was inducted into the Louisiana Sports Hall of Fame. In 2019, he was inducted into the Valley Baseball League Hall of Fame. He was eligible to be elected into the National Hall of Fame in 2019 but received 0 votes, making him ineligible for the 2020 ballot as he failed to meet the 5% vote threshold.

== Post-playing career ==
On August 23, 2015, the first 10,000 fans at Marlins Park received a t-shirt of either Pierre or Dontrelle Willis. He worked as an MLB Network on-air analyst before joining the Marlins as a Minor League Outfield Coordinator for the 2019 and 2020 seasons. In 2021, he was named the head coach of the Parkland Pokers ages 10 and under baseball team, as well as assistant coach of the 8 and under team.

== See also ==
- List of Colorado Rockies team records
- List of Major League Baseball annual stolen base leaders
- List of Major League Baseball annual triples leaders
- List of Major League Baseball career hits leaders
- List of Major League Baseball career putouts as a center fielder leaders
- List of Major League Baseball career putouts as an outfielder leaders
- List of Major League Baseball career singles leaders
- List of Major League Baseball career stolen bases leaders
- List of Major League Baseball stolen base records
- List of Miami Marlins team records
