= Frank Moore (baseball) =

American baseball player (1877–1964)

- Pitcher
- Born: September 12, 1877; Dover, Ohio, U.S.
- Died: May 20, 1964 (aged 86); Portsmouth, Ohio, U.S.
- Batted: Right Threw: Right

MLB debut
- June 14, 1905, for the Pittsburgh Pirates

Last MLB appearance
- June 14, 1905, for the Pittsburgh Pirates

MLB statistics
- Win–loss record: 0–0
- Earned run average: 0.00
- Strikeouts: 1
- Stats at Baseball Reference

Teams
- Pittsburgh Pirates (1905)

Frank J. Moore (September 12, 1877 – May 20, 1964) was an American pitcher in Major League Baseball. He played in one game for the 1905 Pittsburgh Pirates. He pitched three innings, allowing two hits but no runs and striking out one. He played in the minors through 1912 and was later a manager in the Ohio State League and Virginia Mountain League from 1912-1914.
