= Ben Guez =

American baseball player

Sugar Land Skeeters
- Outfielder
- Born: January 24, 1987 (age 39); Houston, Texas, U.S.
- Bats: Right Throws: Right
- Stats at Baseball Reference

Benjamin James Guez (born January 24, 1987) was drafted by the Tigers in 2008, and has played in Detroit's organization from 2008 to 2014. He played in the Milwaukee Brewers organization from 2014 to 2016. In 2012, he was named an MiLB.com Organization All Star for the season, and the Scout.com Toledo Mud Hens Player of the Year. Guez also played for the Israel national baseball team in the Qualification Round to the 2013 World Baseball Classic, playing under the team's manager Brad Ausmus.

== Early and personal life ==
Guez was born in Houston, Texas, where he resides during the off-season. He is Jewish, was Bar Mitzvah at Congregation Or Hadash in 2000, and says his Jewish upbringing "definitely made me more disciplined as a person." Guez played Little League at West U during his childhood.

He attended Lamar High School in Houston, graduating in 2005. There, he played center field for the baseball team, lettering twice, and was first team All-District in 2004 and 2005. He was also selected to the pre-season All-Houston All Star team, and played in the All-Greater-Houston All Star game.

== College career ==
Guez played college baseball at William and Mary, where he majored in economics and kinesiology. In 2007, as a sophomore, he posted a .270 batting average, with 2 home runs and 24 runs batted in. The following year as a junior, his average jumped to .390 and he hit 13 homers, while being ranked 9th nationally in runs scored with 75 (the second-highest total in school history), driving in 51 runs and stealing 15 bases, and he had a .470 on-base percentage and .662 slugging percentage, in 57 games, earning All-Colonial Athletic Association honors, and being named to the Second-Team American Baseball Coaches Association East All-Region Team. That season, he squeeze bunted for the district championship.

During the summer of 2006, he played for the Covington Lumberjacks in the Valley Baseball League, batting .272 with 2 home runs, 18 RBIs, and 12 stolen bases in 42 games. In the summer of 2007 he played with the Bourne Braves in the Cape Cod League, hitting .282 with 3 home runs, 24 RBIs, and 9 stolen bases, and started in center field in the Cape Cod League All-Star Game.

In June 2008, after being recommended by Bill Buck, he was taken by the Tigers in the 19th round of the draft.

== Minor league career ==
=== 2008–10 ===
After being drafted, Guez joined the Oneonta Tigers for his first professional season, and batted .223 over the course of 70 games in 2008. He homered 5 times, drove in 25 runs, and tied for the league lead with 8 outfield assists.

Guez played for the West Michigan Whitecaps, Detroit's affiliate in the Midwest League, for the 2009 season. In 104 appearances, he batted .275 with 12 homers and 64 RBIs, and tied for fourth in the Midwest League with a .483 slugging percentage. A right hamstring strain caused him to take a trip to the disabled list from June 10–25. He rebounded to earn Midwest League Player of the Week honors after batting .440 with 2 homers and 6 runs batted in, and was second in the Midwest League with 67 total bases, from July 13–19. Guez's performance during August, a month in which he hit .355, homered 4 times, and drove in 16 runs, led to him being named the Tigers Minor League Player of the Month.

In 2010, Guez started the year with the Lakeland Flying Tigers. After making only nine appearances with Lakeland, he was promoted to the Toledo Mud Hens, Detroit's top minor league team. On June 3, Guez returned to Lakeland, and remained there for three weeks before joining the Erie SeaWolves on June 24. He once again rejoined Lakeland on July 6. Ten days later, he was moved to Toledo and he finished the minor league season with the Mud Hens. Overall, Guez made 105 appearances with the three clubs, batting .249, homering 10 times, and driving in 43 runs while stealing 14 bases. During the winter, he played for the Surprise Rafters of the Arizona Fall League.

=== 2011–present ===
Guez split the 2011 season between Erie and Toledo. He appeared in 38 games with the SeaWolves, batting .299 with 4 homers and 24 RBIs and a .504 slugging percentage. In 95 appearances for the Mud Hens, his average was .278, he homered 3 times and drove in 32 runs.

As was the case the year before, Guez played with both Erie and Toledo in 2012. He batted .308 with a .481 on-base percentage for Erie over the course of 26 games, while homering 3 times and getting 11 runs batted in. He appeared in 82 games with Toledo and posted a .284 average, .379 on-base percentage, and 455. slugging percentage, with 6 home runs and 37 RBIs with the Mud Hens. He was named an MiLB.com Organization All Star for the season, and the Scout.com Toledo Mud Hens Player of the Year.

In the winter of 2013–14, he played for the Águilas de Mexicali in the Mexican Pacific League.

He played in the 2014 season for the Toledo Mud Hens. In December 2014, the Milwaukee Brewers signed him and invited him to major league spring training. He began 2015 playing for the Brewers' AAA club in Colorado Springs.

In his minor league career he has played all three outfield positions, but mostly played right field and center field.

== Team Israel ==
Guez was a member of the Israel national baseball team (Team Israel) in the Qualification Round to the 2013 World Baseball Classic in September 2012, playing under the team's manager Brad Ausmus. Team Israel, under the Classic's rules, was entitled to have non-Israeli citizens of Jewish heritage play for the team. Guez said that when Ausmus called him up and asked him to play for Team Israel, "it was like a shoo-in. I was honored that he would ask to play for his team. It was kind of a no-brainer."

He batted leadoff and played center field, and joined an outfield that included Adam Greenberg, Joc Pederson, Robbie Widlansky, and Shawn Green. Israel lost to Spain in extra innings in the Pool Finals, missing out on a spot in the World Baseball Classic.

During all three games of the qualifier, Guez batted lead off and started in center field. During the opening game Guez went 0 for 4 with a strike out and a walk. During the second game Guez went 1 for 4, with a run scored and a strike out. During the third and final game, Guez went 1 for 4 with a double, scored a run, with a walk and a strike out.
