= Clifton Forge Railroaders =

- 1914; Clifton Forge, Virginia

Minor league affiliations
- Class: Class D (1914)
- League: Virginia Mountain League (1914)

Major league affiliations
- Team: None

Minor league titles
- League titles (1): 1914*

Team data
- Name: Clifton Forge Railroaders (1914)
- Ballpark: Unknown (1914)

The Clifton Forge Railroaders were a minor league baseball team based in Clifton Forge, Virginia. In 1914, the Clifton Forge Railroaders played as charter members of the short–lived Class D level Virginia Mountain League, winning a "Championship Series" after the league had folded.

== History ==
Clifton Forge, Virginia first began organized baseball, hosting an amateur/semi–professional team in 1890 under the leadership of brothers John, James, and George Mahaney. "The Cliftons" began play in 1890, with white only players and an emphasis on "gentlemanly" play and fan decorum. The Cliftons continued play into the early 1900s, with Covington, Virginia teams as a chief rival. The Cliftons encouraged "ladies" to attend games and were against recruiting players from outside of Clifton Forge, being resistant to play other town teams who recruited non–resident players.

By 1907, Clifton Forge had numerous baseball teams of different levels and ages, the most prominent being the C & O Railway juniors team.

At a meeting in Lynchburg, Virginia on March 3, 1914, discussions began for the formulation of a six–team Class D level baseball league in the Virginia region. Teams were tentatively slated to be based in Lynchburg, Danville, Charlottesville, Clifton Forge, Staunton and Covington, with a salary limit of $800 (per team) monthly. Lynchburg, was hesitant to commit because of a previous $700 lien on its territory, a result of a previous team in the Virginia League. The league was then formed at a March 12, 1914 meeting, without Danville and Lynchburg franchises. B.F. Donovan, of Clifton Forge, was elected league president. D. R. Ellis, of Covington, was elected as vice-president.

On April 6, 1914, Clifton Forge announced that Clarence “Brownie” Erwin, a former Virginia League player, would manage the team, noting that Ervin is reported to be the smallest man to ever wear a professional baseball uniform.

Minor league baseball began in Clifton Forge, Virginia in 1914. The Clifton Forge "Railroaders" became charter members of the four–team Class D level Virginia Mountain League. The Clifton Forge Railroaders were joined by the Charlottesville Tuckahoes, Covington Papermakers and Staunton/Harrisonburg Lunatics in the 1914 league play. The league schedule began play on May 14, 1914.

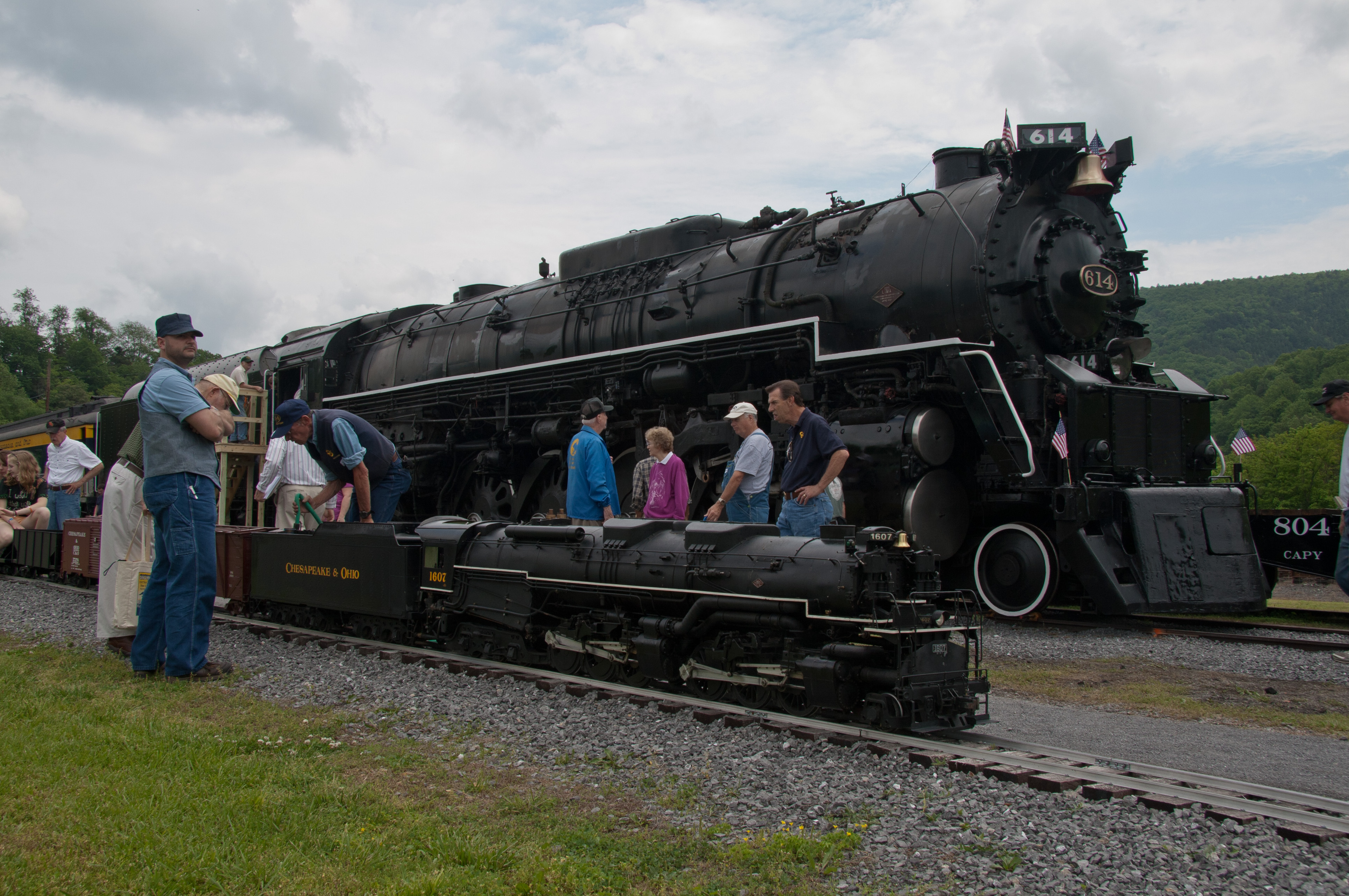
(2011) C&O Railway Heritage Center. 614 in background. Clifton Forge, Virginia

The Clifton Forge, Virginia use of the "Railroaders" moniker corresponds with local industry and history. Passenger rail first arrived in Clifton Forge in 1857. Clifton Forge was home to a major maintenance facility for steam locomotives serving the Chesapeake and Ohio Railway (C&O), which once employed nearly 2,000 workers. Today, Clifton Forge is the home of the Chesapeake and Ohio Historical Society, while the Amtrak continues to serve passengers, with a rail stop at Clifton Forge. The C & O Railway Heritage Center is located in Clifton Forge, supported and operated by the Historical Society.

In their first game, on opening day, May 14, 1914, Clifton Forge lost to Covington. Covington players Krieling and Ellis both hit home runs to lead the Papermakers to a 7–6 win over the Railroaders with 1,500 fans were in attendance for the game held at Covington.

In their only season of play, the Clifton Forge Railroaders placed third in the 1914 Virginia Mountain League in a shortened season. On July 25, 1914, the Railroaders had a record of 28–34 when the Virginia Mountain League permanently folded. Playing under managers Clarence Irwin, Harry Bailey, Edward Eschback and Buck Hooker, Clifton Forge finished 8.5 games behind the first place Covington Papermakers in the final standings. Covington was in first place with a 37–26 record, followed by the second place Charlottesville Tuckahoes (31–30) in the final standings of the shortened season. Third place Clifton Forge was followed by the Staunton / Harrisonburg Lunatics (26–32) in the 1914 league standings.

The Virginia Mountain League was reported to have folded due to poor attendance and the onset of World War I amid "rumors of fixed games."

Shortly after the Virginia Mountain League folded, there was an unsuccessful attempt, headed by Buck Hooker, in August, 1914 to revive the league and the teams.

However, following the collapse of the league, the Covington and Clifton Forge teams elected to play a 10–game championship series. The Railroaders captured the unofficial league “title,” winning 7 of the 10 games. After winning a final doubleheader against Covington by scores of 5–4 and 5–3, a farewell reception and banquet was held for the Clifton Forge players.

Clifton Forge, Virginia has not hosted another minor league franchise

== The ballpark ==
The name of the 1914 Clifton Forge Railroaders home minor league ballpark is not directly referenced. Both Linden Park and Memorial Park were in use in the era and are still in use today. Memorial Park is located beside the former Clifton Forge High School.

== Year–by–year record ==
Year	Record	Finish	Manager	Playoffs/Notes
1914	28–34	3rd	Clarence Irwin / Harry Bailey; Edward Eschback / Buck Hooker	League folded July 25; Won "Championship series"

== Notable alumni ==
- Buck Hooker (1914, MGR)

== See also ==
- List of Chesapeake and Ohio locomotives
