= Everett Fagan =

American baseball player (1918-1983)

- Pitcher
- Born: January 13, 1918; Pottersville, New Jersey, US
- Died: February 16, 1983 (aged 65); Morristown, New Jersey, US
- Batted: Right Threw: Right

MLB debut
- April 24, 1943, for the Philadelphia Athletics

Last MLB appearance
- September 23, 1946, for the Philadelphia Athletics

MLB statistics
- Win–loss record: 2–7
- Earned run average: 5.47
- Innings pitched: 82 1/3
- Stats at Baseball Reference

Teams
- Philadelphia Athletics (1943; 1946)

Everett Joseph Fagan (January 13, 1918 – February 16, 1983) was an American professional baseball player during the 1940s. A right-handed pitcher, he worked in 38 games in the Major Leagues, all but two in relief, for the Philadelphia Athletics during the 1943 and 1946 seasons. Born in the Pottersville section of Tewksbury Township, New Jersey, Fagan stood 6 feet (1.8 m) tall and weighed 195 pounds (88 kg) during his playing career.

His career extended from 1940–1943 and 1946–1947, with two full seasons missed due to United States Army service during World War II. He was a successful minor league hurler who won 53 of 82 decisions (.646), including a 20–12 record and a 2.51 earned run average for the Pulaski Counts of the Class C Virginia League in 1942.

However, during his two Major League stints (which included all of the 1946 season), he lost seven of nine decisions (including both of his 1943 starting assignments), allowing 88 hits and 38 bases on balls, with 21 strikeouts, in 82 1/3 innings pitched.
