= George Ziegler (baseball) =

American baseball player (1872–1916)

- Pitcher
- Born: 1872; Chicago, Illinois, U.S.
- Died: June 22, 1916; Kankakee, Illinois, U.S.

MLB debut
- June 19, 1890, for the Pittsburgh Alleghenys

Last MLB appearance
- June 19, 1890, for the Pittsburgh Alleghenys

MLB statistics
- Win–loss record: 0–1
- Earned run average: 10.50
- Innings pitched: 6
- Stats at Baseball Reference

Teams
- Pittsburgh Alleghenys (1890)

George J. Ziegler (1872 – July 22, 1916) was an American professional baseball pitcher. He appeared in one game in Major League Baseball for the Pittsburgh Alleghenys in 1890. He started the game and pitched six innings, getting the loss and allowing seven runs for an earned run average of 10.50.

== Death ==
He died from a sunstroke in 1916.
