= Casey Field =

Stadium in Covington, Virginia, US

Coordinates: 37°46′58″N 79°59′37.3″W

Casey Field & Boodie Albert Stadium
- Interactive map of Casey Field & Boodie Albert Stadium
- Location: 700 West Oak Street; Covington, Virginia, United States
- Owner: City of Covington
- Capacity: Baseball: 2,000; Football: 7,000
- Surface: Grass

Construction
- Opened: 1962

Tenants
- Covington Lumberjacks (VBL) (2001–Present); Alleghany Cougars (VHSL) (2023–Present); Covington Cougars (VHSL) (1962–2023); Covington Astros (Appy League) (1967–1976); Covington Red Sox (Appy League) (1966)

Casey Field & Boodie Albert Stadium is a multi-purpose stadium located in Covington, Virginia. Games were first played there in 1962 and it is primarily the home stadium for the Alleghany High School Cougars football and baseball teams. It also is home to the Covington Lumberjacks of the Valley Baseball League. It previously served as the home stadium for the Covington High School Cougars The park served as the home of the Covington Red Sox in 1967 and the Covington Astros from 1968 to 1976, both members of the Appalachian League.
