= Virginia Mountain League =

- Classification: Class D (1914)
- Sport: Minor League Baseball
- First season: 1914
- Folded: July 25, 1914
- President: B.F. Donovan (1914)
- No. of teams: 5
- Country: United States of America
- Most titles: 1 Covington Papermakers; Clifton Forge Railroaders*
- Related competitions: Virginia League

The Virginia Mountain League was a minor league baseball organization active in central western Virginia in 1914. The Class D level league folded during its only season of play.

== History ==
On March 3, 1914, at a meeting in Lynchburg, Virginia, discussions began for the formulation of a six–team, Class D level baseball league. Teams were tentatively slated to be based in Lynchburg, Danville, Charlottesville, Clifton Forge, Staunton and Covington, with a salary limit of $800 (per team) monthly. Lynchburg was hesitant to commit because of a previous $700 lien on its territory, a result of a previous team in the Virginia League.

The league was then formed at a March 12, 1914, meeting, without Danville and Lynchburg franchises. B.F. Donovan, of Clifton Forge, was elected league president. D. R. Ellis, of Covington, was elected as vice-president.

The Virginia Mountain League had four teams: the Charlottesville Tuckahoes, the Clifton Forge, Virginia based Clifton Forge Railroaders, the Covington, Virginia based Covington Papermakers; the Staunton, Virginia based Staunton Lunatics and the Harrisonburg, Virginia hosted Harrisonburg Lunatics, The Staunton team later moved to Harrisonburg in July 1914. The league disbanded on July 25, 1914, with Covington in first place with a 37–26 record, 5.0 games ahead of second place Charlottesville.

The Virginia Mountain League was reported to have folded due to poor attendance and the onset of World War I amid "rumors of fixed games."

Shortly after the Virginia Mountain League folded, there was an unsuccessful attempt, headed by Clifton Forge manager Buck Hooker, in August 1914, to revive the league and the teams.

However, following the collapse of the league, the Covington and Clifton Forge teams elected to play a 10–game championship series. The Railroaders captured the unofficial league “title,” winning 7 of the 10 games. After winning a final doubleheader against Covington by scores of 5–4 and 5–3, a farewell reception and banquet was held for the players at Clifton Forge.

== Cities represented ==
- Charlottesville, VA: Charlottesville Tuckahoes 1914
- Clifton Forge, VA: Clifton Forge Railroaders 1914
- Covington, VA: Covington Papermakers 1914
- Harrisonburg, VA: Harrisonburg Lunatics 1914
- Staunton, VA: Staunton Lunatics 1914

== 1914 Virginia Mountain League standings ==
schedule

Team standings	W	L	PCT	GB	Managers
Covington Papermakers	37	26	.587	–	Frank Moore / Nick Carter
Charlottesville Tuckahoes	31	30	.508	5.0	Walter Steinhause
Clifton Forge Railroaders	28	34	.452	8.5	Clarence Irwin / Harvey Bailey; Edward Eschback / Buck Hooker
Staunton Lunatics / Harrisonburg Lunatics	26	32	.448	8.5	Davey Crockett / Pat Krebs

Staunton (15–22) moved to Harrisonburg July 21.
