= Vance Dinges =

American baseball player

- First baseman / Outfielder
- Born: May 29, 1915; Elizabeth, New Jersey, U.S.
- Died: October 4, 1990 (aged 75); Harrisonburg, Virginia, U.S.
- Batted: Left Threw: Left

MLB debut
- April 17, 1945, for the Philadelphia Phillies

Last MLB appearance
- September 15, 1946, for the Philadelphia Phillies

MLB statistics
- Batting average: .291
- Home runs: 2
- Runs batted in: 46
- Stats at Baseball Reference

Teams
- Philadelphia Phillies (1945–1946)

Vance George Dinges (May 29, 1915 – October 4, 1990) was an American professional baseball player. He appeared in 159 Major League games as a first baseman and outfielder for the 1945 and 1946 Philadelphia Phillies. The native of Elizabeth, New Jersey, threw and batted left-handed; he stood 6 feet 2 inches (1.88 m) tall and weighed 175 pounds (79 kg).

Dinges' professional career lasted eleven seasons, 1938 through 1948. He was acquired by the Phillies from the Boston Red Sox in the 1944 Rule 5 draft; Phils' general manager Herb Pennock had previously been the head of the Red Sox' farm system. He made his MLB debut on April 17, 1945, and singled in his first at bat off Curt Davis of the Brooklyn Dodgers. He served as a backup outfielder and first baseman that seasons, appearing in 109 games and batting .287. He also hit his first MLB home run that April 24, a solo blast off the New York Giants' Andy Hansen. Dinges was named a member of the 1945 National League All-Star squad by The Sporting News. But no midsummer classic was played that season and no official All-Star teams were officially chosen by the two leagues because of wartime travel restrictions

Dinges then split 1946 between the Phils and their Utica Blue Sox Eastern League affiliate. He backed up right-handed-hitting first baseman Frank McCormick in 26 games and batted .308, slugging his second big-league homer as a pinch hitter off Ed Bahr of the Pittsburgh Pirates on July 12.

In 553 plate appearances and 501 at bats, Dinges collected 146 Major League hits and posted a batting average of .291.
