= Hill City Howlers =

- Founded in 1963; Lynchburg, Virginia
Team logo
Cap insignia

Minor league affiliations
- Class: Single-A (2021–present)
- Previous classes: Class A-Advanced (1990–2020); Class A (1966–1989); Double-A (1963–1965); Class B (1943–1955)
- League: Carolina League (1966–present)
- Division: North Division
- Previous leagues: Southern League (1963–1965); South Atlantic League (1962–1963); Appalachian League (1959); Piedmont League (1943–1955); Virginia League (1886–1942, various)

Major league affiliations
- Team: Cleveland Guardians (2015–present)
- Previous teams: Atlanta Braves (2011–2014); Cincinnati Reds (2010); Pittsburgh Pirates (1995–2009); Boston Red Sox (1988–1994); New York Mets (1976–1987); Texas Rangers (1975); Minnesota Twins (1970–1974); Chicago White Sox (1963–1969); St. Louis Cardinals (1943–1955)

Minor league titles
- League titles (9): 1978; 1983; 1984; 1997; 2002; 2009; 2012; 2017; 2025
- Division titles (2): 2022; 2025
- First-half titles (2): 2022; 2025

Team data
- Name: Hill City Howlers (2026–present)
- Previous names: Lynchburg Hillcats (1995–2025); Lynchburg Red Sox (1988–1994); Lynchburg Mets (1976–1987); Lynchburg Rangers (1975); Lynchburg Twins (1970–1974); Lynchburg White Sox (1963–1969); Lynchburg Cardinals (1943–1955); Lynchburg Senators (1940–1942); Lynchburg Grays (1939); Lynchburg Shoemakers (1906–1917, various); Lynchburg Climbers (1894–1896)
- Colors: Blue, red, light blue, dark gray, gray
- Mascot: Indy the Werewolf
- Ballpark: Lynchburg City Stadium (1963–present)
- Owner/ Operator: Howlers Baseball LLC (Dylan Narang) (2024–present)
- General manager: Matt Ramstead
- Manager: Erlin Cerda
- Website: milb.com/hill-city

The Hill City Howlers (formerly the Lynchburg Hillcats) are a Minor League Baseball team in Lynchburg, Virginia, that plays in the Carolina League and is the Single-A affiliate of the Cleveland Guardians. They were a farm team of the Atlanta Braves from 2011 to 2014, the Cincinnati Reds in 2010, and the Pittsburgh Pirates from 1995 to 2009. The Howlers play home games at City Stadium; refurbished in 2004, the stadium seats 4,291 people.

The franchise, known as the Lynchburg Hillcats since 1995, planned to rebrand after the 2016 season. However, when put to a fan vote for a new moniker with "Derechos", "Doves", "Lamb Chops", "Love Apples", and "River Runners" as options, a majority of fans voted to retain the Hillcats name. The team opted instead for new logos and a different color scheme, consisting of seven hills green, Blue Ridge blue, and midnight blue, for the 2017 season.

In conjunction with Major League Baseball's restructuring of Minor League Baseball in 2021, the Hillcats were organized into the Low-A East at the Low-A classification. In 2022, the Low-A East became known as the Carolina League, the name historically used by the regional circuit prior to the 2021 reorganization, and was reclassified as a Single-A circuit.

Lynchburg Baseball Corp. sold the team to Elmore Sports Group in 2015. In 2024, Dylan Narang purchased the Hillcats from Elmore Sports Group. The team rebranded as the Hill City Howlers on February 13, 2026. The rebrand consisted of several new mascots including: Indy the Werewolf, Murray the Mummy, El Gordo the Luchador, Victor the Vampire, Daisy the Bride, and Gilly the Creature.

== Division and league championships ==
- 1896 State League Champions, No playoffs.
- 1906 Virginia League Champions, No playoffs.
- 1940 Virginia League Champions, Senators over Harrisonburg Turks, 3–2.
- 1944 Piedmont League Champions, Cardinals over Portsmouth Cubs, 4–3.
- 1948 Piedmont League Regular Season Champions, Cardinals lose to Newport News Dodgers, 0–4.
- 1949 Piedmont League Champions, Cardinals over Portsmouth Cubs, 4–2.
- 1962 South Atlantic League Regular Season Champions, White Sox lose to Macon, 0–3.
- 1963 South Atlantic League 2nd-Half Champions, White Sox lose to Augusta, 2–3.
- 1964 Southern League Champions, No playoffs.
- 1973 Carolina League 1st-Half Champions, Twins lose to Winston-Salem, 2–3.
- 1977 Carolina League 1st-Half Champions, Mets lose to Peninsula, 2–3.
- 1978 Carolina League Champions, Mets over Peninsula, 3–0.
- 1982 Carolina League 2nd-Half Northern Division Champions, Mets lose to Alexandria in one-game Divisional playoff.
- 1983 Carolina League Champions, Mets sweep Northern Division and win over Winston-Salem, 3–0.
- 1984 Carolina League Champions, Mets sweep Northern Division and win over Durham, 3–1.
- 1985 Carolina League Northern Division Champions, Mets sweep Division lose to Winston-Salem, 1–3.
- 1988 Carolina League 2nd-Half Northern Division Champions, Red Sox over Salem, 2–1, in playoffs, lose to Kinston, 2–3, in Championship.
- 1989 Carolina League 1st-Half Northern Division Champions, Red Sox lose to Prince William, 1–2, in playoffs.
- 1991 Carolina League 2nd-Half Northern Division Champions, Red Sox over Prince William, 2–0, in playoffs, lose to Kinston, 0–3, in Championship.
- 1992 Carolina League Northern Division Champions, Red Sox sweep Division lose to Peninsula, 2–3, in Championship.
- 1997 Carolina League Champions, Hillcats win 2nd-Half Northern Division, over Frederick, 2–0, in playoffs, over Kinston, 3–1, in Championship.
- 2000 Carolina League 2nd-Half Northern Division Champions, Hillcats over Frederick, 2–0, in playoffs, lose to Myrtle Beach, 0–3, in Championship.
- 2002 Carolina League Champions, Hillcats win Northern Division Wildcard, over Wilmington, 2–1, in playoffs, over Kinston, 3–1, in Championship.
- 2003 Carolina League 1st-Half Northern Division Champions, Hillcats over Wilmington, 2–0, in playoffs, lose to Winston-Salem, 0–3, in Championship.
- 2005 Carolina League 1st-Half Northern Division Champions, Hillcats lose to Frederick, 0–2, in playoffs.
- 2009 Carolina League Champions, 1st-Half Northern Division Champions, Hillcats over Wilmington, 3–2, in playoffs, over Salem, 3–0, in Championship.
- 2012 Carolina League Champions, 1st-Half Northern Division Champions, Hillcats over Wilmington, 2–1, in playoffs, over Winston-Salem, 3–1, in Championship.
- 2013 Carolina League 2nd-Half Northern Division Wild Card, Hillcats lose to Potomac, 0–2, in playoffs.
- 2014 Carolina League 2nd-Half Northern Division Wild Card, Hillcats lose to Potomac, 0–2, in playoffs.
- 2015 Carolina League 2nd-Half Northern Division Champions, Hillcats lose to Wilmington, 2–0, in playoffs.
- 2016 Carolina League 1st-Half & 2nd-Half Northern Division Champions, Hillcats over Potomac, 2–1, in playoffs, lose to Myrtle Beach, 3–1, in Championship.
- 2017 Carolina League Champions, Hillcats over Frederick in playoffs, 2–1, declared co-champions with Down East as a result of the playoffs being called off because of Hurricane Irma.
- 2025 Carolina League Champions, Hillcats over Columbia Fireflies in Championship Series, 2–1.

== Roster ==
Hill City Howlers roster
Players		Coaches/Other
Pitchers: 30 Ryan Bilka; 21 Evan Chrest; 29 Parker Coil; 38 Ryan DeSanto; 39 Parker Dillhoff; 34 Miguel Flores; 37 Will Hynes; 35 Carson Lane; 27 Manuel Osorio; 43 Angel Pérez; 23 Erigaldi Perez; 40 Ryan Prager; 36 Harrison Ruiz; 41 Aaron Savary; 31 Javi Torres; 25 Keegan Zinn	Catchers: 22 Pedro Delmagro; 13 Reiner Herrera; 46 Deiten Lachance; Infielders: 1 Angel Abreu; 16 Jhorvic Abreus; 7 Ben Cleary; 6 Alejandro Garza; 11 Jonathan Martínez; 24 Luis Merejo; 15 Gabriel Rodriguez; 4 Johan Rodriguez; Outfielders: 5 Alejandro Blasco; 32 Tre Broussard; 2 Yeiferth Castillo; 8 Erick Dessens; 9 Lucas Moore	Manager: 10 Erlin Cerda; Coaches: 3 Chase Barbary (bench); 12 Kevin Erminio (pitching); 33 Il Hor (hitting); 47 Amanda Kamekona (hitting); 60-day injured list: -- Robert Arias; 7-day injured list; * On Cleveland Guardians 40-man roster; ~ Development list; # Rehab assignment; ∞ Reserve list; ‡ Restricted list; § Suspended list; † Temporarily inactive list; Roster updated September 24, 2026; Transactions; → More rosters: MiLB • Carolina League; → Cleveland Guardians minor league players

== Notable Lynchburg/Hill City alumni ==
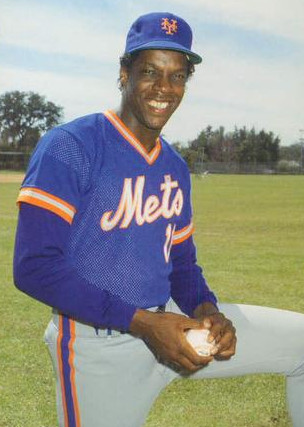
Dwight Gooden

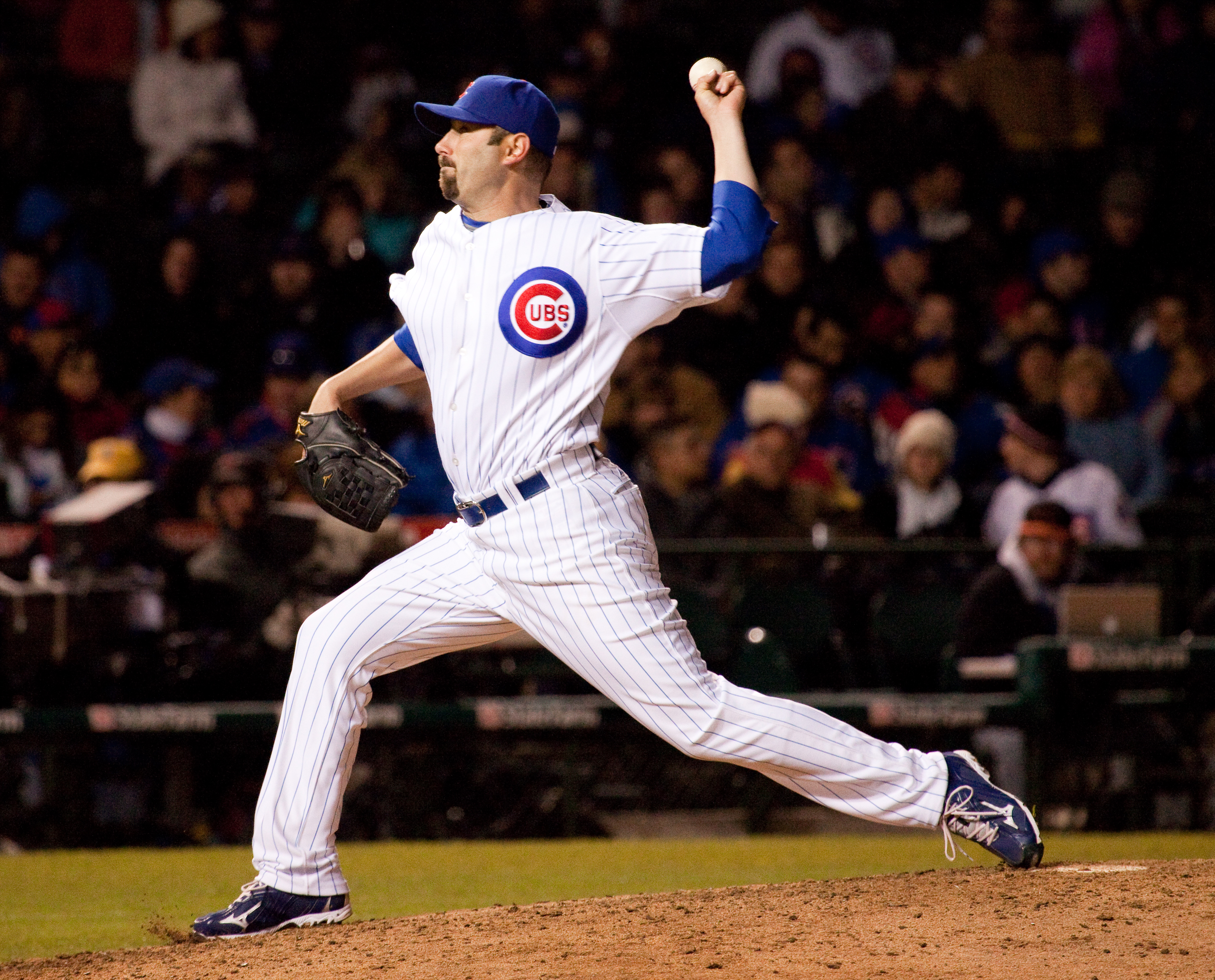
John Grabow

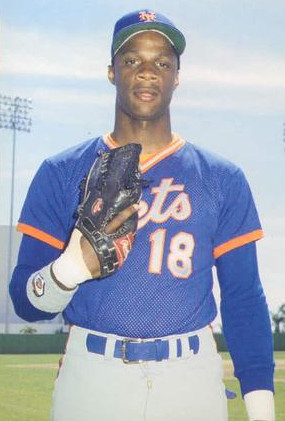
Darryl Strawberry

Baseball Hall of Fame alumni

- Red Schoendienst (1943) Inducted, 1989

Notable alumni

- Eli Morgan, 2018
- Willi Castro, 2016
- Anthony Santander, 2016
- Andrelton Simmons (2011), 4 x Gold Glove winner
- Neil Walker, 2005–06
- Nyjer Morgan, 2005–06
- Rajai Davis, 2004
- Henry Owens, 2004
- Zach Duke, 2004
- Paul Maholm, 2004
- José Bautista, 2003
- Nate McLouth, 2000–02
- John Grabow, 2001
- Joe Beimel, 2000
- Bronson Arroyo (1997) MLB All-Star
- Kris Benson (1997)
- Aramis Ramírez, 1997 MLB All-Star
- Jose Guillen (1996)
- Trot Nixon, 1994
- Aaron Sele (1992) 2 x MLB All-Star
- Scott Hatteberg (1991)
- John Valentin (1989)
- Scott Cooper (1988) 2 x MLB All-Star
- José Bautista (pitcher), 1985
- Kevin Elster (1985)
- Rick Aguilera (1984) 3 x MLB All-Star
- Dave Magadan (1984)
- Randy Myers (1984) 4 x MLB All-Star
- Lenny Dykstra (1983) 3 x MLB All-Star
- Dwight Gooden (1983, 1987) 4 x MLB All-Star; 1984 NL Rookie of the Year; 1985 NL CY Young Award
- Roger McDowell (1982)
- Kevin Mitchell (1982) 2 x MLB All-Star; 1989 NL Most Valuable Player
- Lloyd McClendon (1981–82)
- Darryl Strawberry (1981) 8 x MLB All-Star; 1983 NL Rookie of the Year
- Billy Beane (1981)
- Jody Davis (1978) 2 x MLB All-Star
- Greg Harris (1978)
- Jeff Reardon (1977) 4 x MLB All-Star
- Alex Trevino (1976)
- Dave Goltz (1974)
- Al Fitzmorris (1968)
- Carlos May (1968) 2 x MLB All-Star
- Gail Hopkins, 1967
- Andy Etchebarren (1963) 2 x MLB All-Star
- Don Buford (1962) MLB All-Star
- Dave DeBusschere (1962) 8 x NBA All-Star
- Joe Hoerner (1962) MLB All-Star
- J.C. Martin (1962)
- John McNamara (1952)
- Stan Spence (1951) 4 x MLB All-Star
- Ray Jablonski (1950) MLB All-Star
- Wes Ferrell (1942, 1946) 2 x MLB All-Star
- Walter Moser (1906)
- Al Orth (1909) 1906 AL wins leader
- Tommy La Stella (2016) World Series champion
- Bobby Bradley (2016)
- Yu Chang (2016)
- Francisco Mejia (2016)
- Greg Allen (2016)
