= Covington Lumberjacks =

US collegiate summer baseball team

Information
- League: Valley Baseball League
- Location: Covington, Virginia
- Ballpark: Casey Field
- Founded: 2001
- League championships: 2: (2005) (2011)
- Colors: Black and Blue
- Ownership: City of Covington (a 501(c)3 non-profit)
- Coach: Renny Tolentino

The Covington Lumberjacks are a collegiate summer baseball team in Covington, Virginia. They play in the Valley Baseball League. The team was founded in 2001 and the Lumberjacks play their home games at Casey Field in downtown Covington.

Since joining the league in 2001, the Lumberjacks claim two league titles in 2005 and 2011. They were league runners-up in 2008 and 2009 and most recently won the leagues Southern Division regular season title in 2018. The Lumberjacks have been consistent in having alumni drafted in the major leagues, including several who have had substantial MLB careers.

== Notable players ==
- David Carpenter, catcher/pitcher
- Ben Guez, outfielder
- Jason Kipnis, second baseman
- Collin Cowgill, outfielder
- Robby Scott, pitcher
- Craig Tatum, catcher
- Kevin Munson, pitcher
- Brendan Katin, outfielder
- Carlos Guevara, pitcher
- Sherman Johnson, second baseman
