= Harry Chozen =

American baseball player (1915–1994)

- Catcher
- Born: September 27, 1915; Winnebago, Minnesota, U.S.
- Died: September 16, 1994 (aged 78); Houston, Texas, U.S.
- Batted: Right Threw: Right

MLB debut
- September 21, 1937, for the Cincinnati Reds

Last MLB appearance
- September 21, 1937, for the Cincinnati Reds

MLB statistics
- Games played: 1
- At bats: 4
- Hits: 1
- Stats at Baseball Reference

Teams
- Cincinnati Reds (1937)

Harry Chozen (September 27, 1915 – September 16, 1994) was an American professional baseball player in the 1930s, 1940s, and 1950s. Although Chozen only played in one game in the major leagues (for the Cincinnati Reds, batting 1-for-4) he had a 17-year career in the minor leagues as a catcher. Chozen is best known for setting a Southern Association record when he had a base hit in 49 games in a row in 1945. His brothers, Myer and Robert, also played baseball in the minor leagues. He was Jewish.
