= Hank Hulvey =

American baseball player (1897-1982)

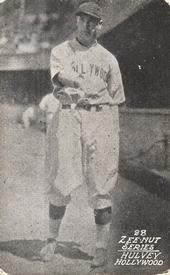
- Pitcher
- Born: July 18, 1897; Mount Sidney, Virginia, U.S.
- Died: April 9, 1982 (aged 84); Mount Sidney, Virginia, U.S.
- Batted: Both Threw: Right

MLB debut
- September 5, 1923, for the Philadelphia Athletics

Last MLB appearance
- September 5, 1923, for the Philadelphia Athletics

MLB statistics
- Win–loss record: 0–1
- Earned run average: 7.71
- Strikeouts: 2
- Stats at Baseball Reference

Teams
- Philadelphia Athletics (1923)

James Hensel "Hank" Hulvey (July 18, 1897 – April 9, 1982) was an American professional baseball player. He was a right-handed pitcher for one season (1923) with the Philadelphia Athletics. For his career, he compiled an 0–1 record, with a 7.71 earned run average, and two strikeouts in seven innings pitched. He gave up Babe Ruth's 230th homerun on September 5, 1923, in his only game starting as pitcher.

Hulvey pitched 19 season in minor league baseball, winning 221 minor league games. An alumnus of Shenandoah University, he was born and later died in Mount Sidney, Virginia at the age of 84.
