= Buck Hooker =

American baseball player (1880–1929)

- Pitcher
- Born: August 28, 1880; Richmond, Virginia, U.S.
- Died: July 2, 1929 (aged 48); Richmond, Virginia, U.S.
- Batted: Unknown Threw: Right

MLB debut
- September 5, 1902, for the Cincinnati Reds

Last MLB appearance
- April 29, 1903, for the Cincinnati Reds

MLB statistics
- Win–loss record: 0–1
- Earned run average: 3.48
- Strikeouts: 0
- Stats at Baseball Reference

Teams
- Cincinnati Reds (1902–1903)

William Edward Hooker (August 28, 1880 – July 2, 1929) was an American professional baseball player, who played pitcher in the Major Leagues in 1902–1903. He played for the Cincinnati Reds. He remained active in the minors through 1915, and had a few stints as a player/manager.
