= Harrisonburg Turks =

Harrisonburg Turks
Founded	1915
Field	Eagle Field at Veterans Memorial Park
Team History	Harrisonburg Turks; Class C Virginia League (1915–1944); Massanutten League (1945–1949); VBL (1950–present)
Division	Southern Division (1950–2008, 2015-22); Central Division (2009–2013)
Championships	13 (1955) (1958) (1959) (1962) (1964) (1969) (1970) (1971) (1977) (1991) (2000) (2012) (2023)
Runner-Up	13 (1957) (1961) (1967) (1968) (1975) (1976) (1978) (1984) (1986) (1989) (1992) (1994) (1996)
Owner	Gerald Harman
Head coach	Bob Wease

The Harrisonburg Turks are a collegiate summer baseball team in Harrisonburg, Virginia. They play in the South Division of the Valley Baseball League, a collegiate wooden bat summer league consisting of 11 teams in the state of Virginia. The Turks have been coached and/or owned by Bob Wease for 33 years as of the end of the 2023 season. Wease sold the team to Gerald Harman prior to the start of the 2023 season. The Turks play their home games at Eagle Field at Veterans Memorial Park on the campus of James Madison University.

== Notable alumni ==
- Scott Cousins
- Roy Corcoran
- Rich Croushore
- Steve Decker
- David Eckstein
- Steve Finley
- Jesse Foppert
- Danny Godby
- Orlando Gonzalez
- Travis Harper
- Gary Hill
- Ron Hodges
- Chris Hoiles
- Mike Hubbard
- Daryl Irvine
- Logan Kensing
- Darren Lewis
- Sean Maloney
- Kirt Manwaring
- Frank Menechino
- Larry Mitchell
- Oscar Múñoz
- Tim Nordbrook
- Talmadge Nunnari
- Brian O'Connor
- Jim Pankovits
- Cliff Pennington
- Juan Pierre
- Greg Pryor
- Jon Rauch
- Billy Sample
- Ryan Shealy
- Doug Strange
- Steve Swisher
- Jeff Tam
- Mo Vaughn
- George Vukovich
- Brian Wolfe
- Jon Zuber
