= Edenton Colonials =

- 1951–1952; Edenton, North Carolina

Minor league affiliations
- Class: Class D (1951–1952)
- League: Virginia League (1951); Coastal Plain League (1952)

Major league affiliations
- Team: None

Minor league titles
- League titles (1): 1952
- Wild card berths (2): 1951; 1952

Team data
- Name: Edenton Colonials (1951–1952)
- Ballpark: Hicks Field (1951–1952)

The Edenton Colonials were a minor league baseball team based in Edenton, North Carolina. In 1951 and 1952, the Colonials played as members of the Class D level Virginia League in 1951 and Coastal Plain League in 1952, winning the 1952 league championship in their final season of play. The Edenton Colonials hosted home games at the Historic Hicks Field.

== History ==
Minor league baseball began in Edenton, North Carolina in 1951, when the Edenton "Colonials," became members of the six–team Class D level Virginia League. Edenton joined the Colonial Heights-Petersburg Generals, Elizabeth City Albemarles, Emporia Rebels, Franklin Kildees and Suffolk Goobers teams in playing what became the final season of the league.

Beginning Virginia League play on May 4, 1951, the Edenton Colonials finished the regular season in third place. The Colonials ended the season with a record of 63–55, playing under manager Gashouse Parker. The Colonials finished 16.5 games behind the first place Colonial Heights-Petersburg Generals in the final regular season standings. In the first round of the playoffs, eventual champion Elizabeth City defeated Edenton 4 games to 3. The Virginia League folded at the end of the 1951 season.

In their final season of play, the 1952 Edenton Colonials, became charter members of the eight–team Class D level Coastal Plain League. Edenton joined the Goldsboro Jets, Kinston Eagles, New Bern Bears, Roanoke Rapids Jays, Rocky Mount Leafs, Tarboro Tars and Wilson Tobs teams in playing the final season of Class D level baseball for the league.

On July 21, 1952, the local "Chowan Herald" newspaper reported the Colonials had lost 3 of their previous 5 games and were in third place with a 47–42 record. Edmonton had just played to a 0–0 tie with Wilson after the game was rained out. Previously, Edenton had defeated Rocky Mount 2–0 behind the pitching of "Monk" Raines.

The Edenton Colonials won the 1952 Coastal Plain League championship. Playing under managers Gashouse Parker, Vernon Mustian and Tom Inge, the Colonels finished the regular season with a record of 69–55, placing third in the Coastal Plain League regular season standings. The Colonials finished 7.5 games behind the first place Kingston Eagles in the final standings. Pitcher John Raines led the Coastal Plain League with 26 wins. In the first round of the playoffs, Edenton swept Wilson in 4 games to advance. In the Finals, Edenton defeated the Goldsboro Jets 4 games to 1 to win the championship. The Coastal Plain League permanently folded following the 1938 season.

Edenton, North Carolina has not hosted another minor league team.

Beginning in 2015 Edenton and Historic Hicks Field hosted the Edenton Steamers of collegiate summer baseball, members of the Premier Collegiate League.

== The ballpark ==
The Edenton Colonials teams played 1951 and 1952 home minor league games at Hicks Field. The ballpark was constructed in 1939 and is still in use today. Adjacent to John A. Holmes High School, Hicks field was listed on the National Register of Historic Places in 1995. The Edenton Steamers continued play at Hicks Field.

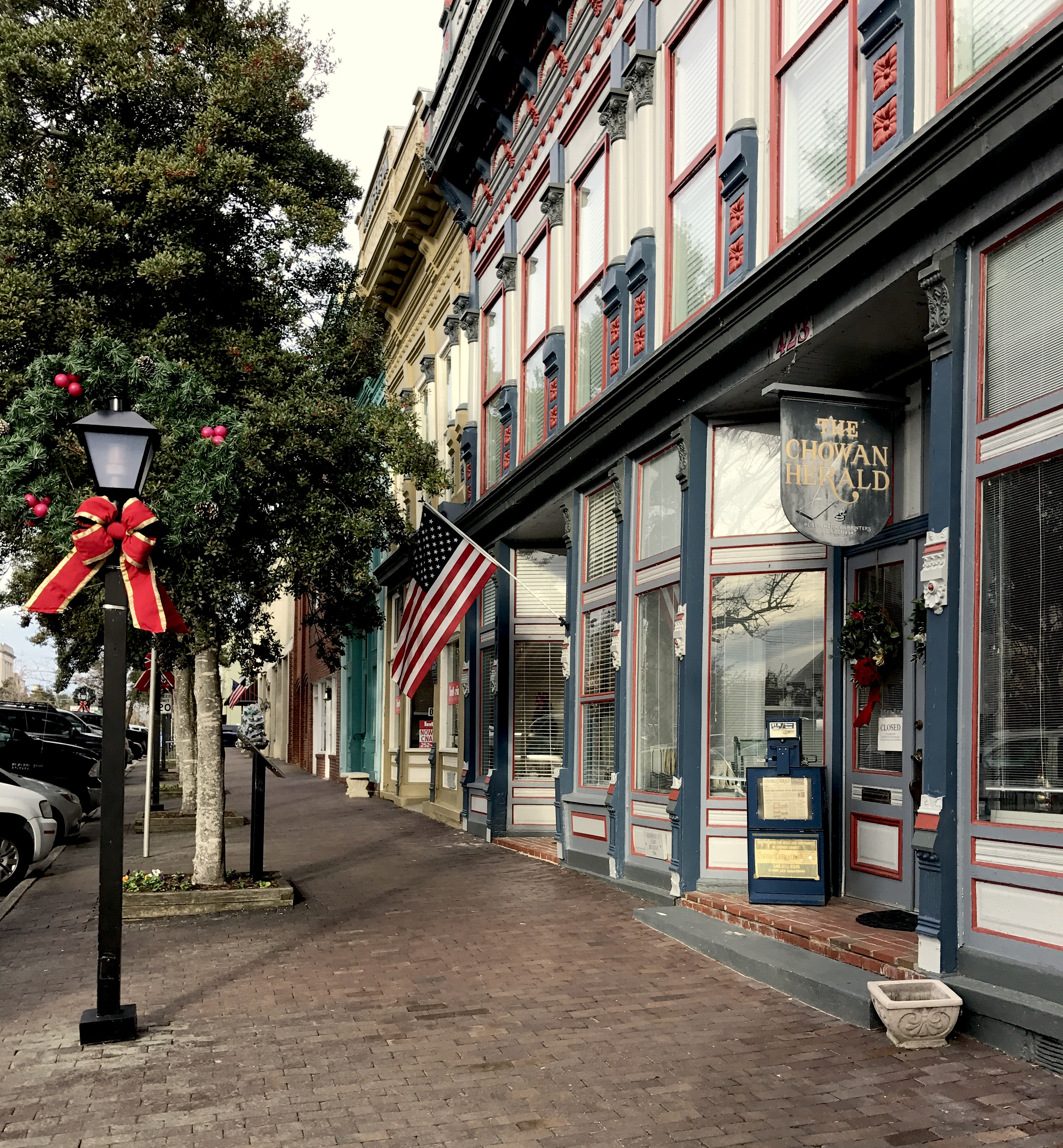
(2019) Downtown Edenton, The Chowan Herald in the foreground. Edenton, North Carolina.

== Timeline ==
Year(s)	# Yrs.	Team	Level	League	Ballpark
1951	1	Edenton Colonials	Class D	Virginia League	Hicks Field
1952	1	Edenton Colonials	Class D	Coastal Plain League	Hicks Field

== Year–by–year records ==
Year	Record	Finish	Manager	Playoffs/Notes
1951	63–55	3rd	Gashouse Parker	Lost in 1st round
1952	69–55	3rd	Gashouse Parker / Vernon Mustian / Tom Inge	League champions

== Notable alumni ==
- Elder White (1952)
