= Elizabeth City Albemarles =

- 1950–1951; Elizabeth City, North Carolina

Minor league affiliations
- Class: Class D (1950–1951)
- League: Virginia League V (1950–1951)

Major league affiliations
- Team: None

Minor league titles
- League titles (1): 1951
- Wild card berths (1): 1950

Team data
- Name: Elizabeth City Albemarles (1950–1951)
- Ballpark: Memorial Park (1950–1951)

The Elizabeth City Albemarles were a minor league baseball team based in Elizabeth City, North Carolina. In 1950 and 1951, the Albemarles played as members of the Virginia League, winning the 1951 league championship in the final season of the league. The Elizabeth City Albemarles hosted minor league home games at Memorial Park.

== History ==
The "Albemarles" were preceded in minor league play by the 1911 "Elizabeth City" team. Elizabeth City played a partial 1911 season as members of the short–lived Tidewater League. Elizabeth City ended their season with an 8–8 record under manager Earl Holt, as the team folded during the only season of the league.

Elizabeth City had hosted a semipro team, playing numerous seasons as members of the Albemarle League.

In 1950, the Elizabeth City Albemarles became members of the six–team, Class D level Virginia League. The Emporia Nationals, Franklin Kildees, Hopewell Blue Sox, Petersburg Generals and Suffolk Goobers joined Elizabeth City in beginning league play on April 29, 1950.

The use of the "Albemarles" nickname corresponds with the Albemarle Settlements, which were the first permanent English settlements in what became North Carolina and the Albemarle Sound in the region. Today, Elizabeth City is home to the College of the Albemarle and the Museum of the Albemarle.

In their first season of play, the 1950 Elizabeth City Albemarles qualified for the playoffs. With a record of 68–61, Elizabeth City ended the regular season in 3rd place, with the Albemarles playing under manager Paul Crawford. Elizabeth City finished 3.5 games behind the first place Emporia Nationals. In the playoffs, the Petersburg Generals defeated Elizabeth City Albemarles 4 games to 2. Pitcher Herman Dowdy of Elizabeth City led the league with 176 strikeouts.

In their final season, the 1951 Elizabeth City Albemarles won the Virginia League championship in the final season for the league. Elizabeth City qualified for the playoffs with a runner–up place finish in the regular season standings. The Albemarles ended the Virginia League regular season with a record of 67–50, finishing 12.0 games behind the first place Colonial Heights-Petersburg Generals. In the playoffs, Elizabeth City defeated the Edenton Colonials 4 games to 3 in the first round. In the Finals, Elizabeth City won the championship by defeating the Colonial Heights-Petersburg Generals 4 games to 1 in the final games for the teams and the league.

The Virginia League permanently folded as a minor league following the 1951 season. Elizabeth City has not hosted another minor league team.

== The ballpark ==
The Elizabeth City Albemarles hosted home minor league home games at Memorial Park.

== Timeline ==
Year(s)	# Yrs.	Team	Level	League	Ballpark
1950–1951	2	Elizabeth City Albemarles	Class D	Virginia League	Memorial Park

== Year–by–year records ==
Year	Record	Finish	Manager	Attend	Playoffs/Notes
1950	68–61	3rd	Paul Crawford	35,000	Lost in 1st round
1951	67–50	2nd	Paul Crawford	34,301	League champions

== Notable alumni ==
No Elizabeth City alumni advanced to the major leagues.
