= Hopewell Blue Sox =

- 1949–1950; (1916, 1949–1950); Hopewell, Virginia

Minor league affiliations
- Class: Class C (1916); Class D (1949–1950)
- League: Virginia League (1916); Virginia League V (1949–1950)

Major league affiliations
- Team: None

Minor league titles
- League titles (0): None
- Wild card berths (1): 1950

Team data
- Name: Hopewell Powder Puffs (1916); Hopewell Blue Sox (1949–1950)
- Ballpark: Elm Street Ball Park (1949–1950)

The Hopewell Blue Sox were a minor league baseball team based in Hopewell, Virginia. The Blue Sox played as members of the Virginia League in 1949 and 1950, qualifying for the 1950 playoffs. The Blue Sox were preceded in league play by the 1916 Hopewell Power Puffs, who played a partial season as members of the earlier version of the Virginia League. Hopewell hosted minor league home games at the Elm Street Ball Park.

== History ==
Minor league baseball began in Hopewell, Virginia in 1916. The Hopewell Powder Puffs became members of the Class C level Virginia League. Hopewell joined the Newport News Shipbuilders, Norfolk Tars, Petersburg Goobers, Portsmouth Truckers and Rocky Mount Tar Heels in beginning league play on April 24, 1916.

In their first season of minor league play, the Hopewell Powder Puffs team disbanded before completing the season. Hopewell disbanded on July 22, 1916. The Powder puffs had a 30–52 record under managers Win Clark and R. Barrett when the franchise folded. A Roanoke Rapids, North Carolina based franchise was added as a replacement for Hopewell on August 14, 1916. However, the Virginia League directors did not allow the franchise and Roanoke Rapids was dropped on August 16, 1916, after winning its only game. The franchise did not return to the 1917 Virginia League.

In 1949, minor league baseball play returned to Hopewell, Virginia. The Hopewell "Blue Sox" joined the reformed six–team Class D level Virginia League, replacing the Blackstone Barristers franchise in the league. The Emporia Nationals, Franklin Kildees, Lawrenceville Robins, Petersburg Generals and Suffolk Goobers teams joined Hopewell in league play.

True to their moniker, the Hopewell Blue Sox wore players wore uniforms with corresponding blue stirrups.

Playing under manager Joe Mills, the Blue Sox finished the 1949 season with a record of 52–75, placing fifth in the Virginia League regular season standings. Hopewell finished the regular season 27.5 games behind the first place Franklin Kildees and did not qualify for the playoffs, won by the Petersburg Generals.

In 1950, the Hopewell Blue Sox played their final season and qualified for the playoffs. With a record of 65–65, Hopewell ended the regular season in an identical fourth place tie with the Franklin Kildees. Hopewell played the season under manager Herbert Moore and finished 7.0 games behind the first place Emporia Nationals in the regular season standings. The Blue Sox won the playoff tiebreaker after Franklin forfeited the contest, rather than play. Hopewell then lost in the first round of the playoffs, being defeated the Emporia Nationals 4 games to 1. After the season, the Hopewell franchise folded, replaced by the Edenton Colonials in the 1951 final season of the Virginia League.

Hopewell, Virginia has not hosted another minor league team.

== The ballparks ==
The Hopewell Blue Sox teams hosted home minor league home games at the Elm Street Ball Park. The ballpark was located at Elm Street and Beverley Place, Hopewell, Virginia. Today, the site is a shopping center.

== Timeline ==
Year(s)	# Yrs.	Team	Level	League	Ballpark
1916	1	Hopewell Powder Puffs	Class C	Virginia League	Elm Street Ball Park
1949–1950	2	Hopewell Blue Sox	Class D	Virginia League	Elm Street Ball Park

== Year–by–year records ==
Year	Record	Finish	Manager	Playoffs/Notes
1916	30–52	NA	Win Clark / R. Barrett	Team folded July 22
1949	52–75	5th	Joe Mills	Did not qualify
1950	65–65	4th	Herbert Moore	Lost 1st round

== Notable alumni ==
- Win Clark (1916, MGR)
- Mike Handiboe (1916)
- Bill Howerton (1950)
- Buck Hopkins (1916)
- Gene Steinbrenner (1916)

=== See also ===
- Hopewell Blue Sox players
- Hopewell Powder Puffs players
