= Virginia League (disambiguation) =

Eastern Carolina League may refer to:

- Virginia League, former Minor League Baseball league of 1906–1928
- Virginia League (1894–96), former Minor League Baseball league of 1894–1896
- Virginia League (1900), former Minor League Baseball league in 1900
- Virginia League (1939–42), former Minor League Baseball league of 1939–1942
- Virginia League (1948–51), former Minor League Baseball league of 1948–1951
- Virginia League (collegiate baseball), former College Summer Baseball league
