= Norfolk Phenoms =

- 1900; Norfolk, Virginia

Minor league affiliations
- Class: Class D (1900)
- League: Virginia League (1900)

Major league affiliations
- Team: None

Minor league titles
- League titles (0): None

Team data
- Name: Norfolk Phenoms (1900)
- Ballpark: Bain Field (1900)

The Norfolk Phenoms were a minor league baseball team based in Norfolk, Virginia. In 1900, the Norfolk Phenoms played as members of the Virginia League, winning the league championship as the league folded during the season.

Hosting home games at Bain Field, the Phenoms were immediately preceded by the 1898 Norfolk Jewels of the Atlantic League.

Baseball Hall of Fame member Christy Mathewson played for the Norfolk Phenoms, leading the league in wins and strikeouts. Mathewson made his major league debut in 1900, shortly after the Virginia League had folded.

== History ==
In their final season of Atlantic League play, the 1898 Norfolk Jewels finished in last place and did not return to play in 1899.

The 1900 Norfolk Phenoms began play as members of the six–team, Class D level Virginia League. Norfolk joined the Hampton Crabs, Newport News Shipbuilders, Petersburg Farmers, Portsmouth Boers and Richmond Bluebirds teams in beginning league play on April 30, 1900.

The "Phenoms" nickname corresponded to Norfolk player/manager Phenomenal Smith. The previous season, Smith had managed the 1899 Portland Phenoms, also using the Smith nickname for the team.

On July 11, 1900, the Virginia League folded. The Norfolk Phenoms won the Atlantic League championship in the shortened season. When the league folded, the Phenoms ended the season with a record of 43–14, playing the season under player/manager Phenomenal Smith. Norfolk finished 14.0 games ahead of the second place Hampton Crabs in the final standings.

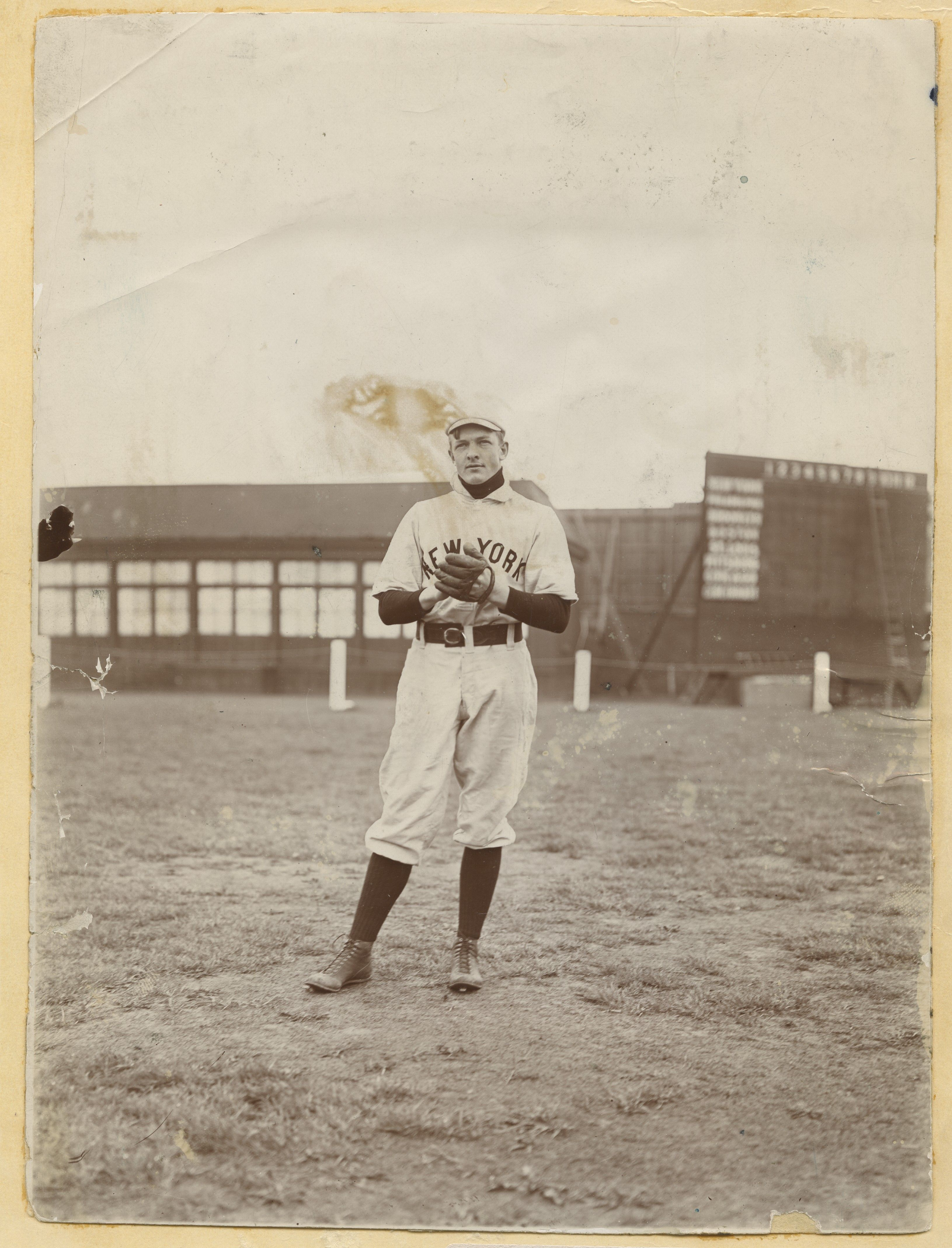
Christy Mathewson c1900-01

Baseball Hall of Fame member Christy Mathewson played for the Phenoms in his second season of professional play, at age 19. Mathewson led the league with 18 wins and 121 strikeouts. Mathewson was called up to the major leagues by the New York Giants after the Phenoms folded.

Phenomenal Smith recruited Mathewson despite his 2–13 season for the Taunton Herrings of the 1899 New England League, after Mathewson finished playing football at Bucknell University. Smith first met and played against Matthewson in the 1899 season, while Matthewson was still a student at Bucknell and pitching for the Taunton Herrings against Smith's Portland Phenoms team. Smith saw potential and signed Matthewson to a contract in 1900 to play for Norfolk for $90.00 per month. Under Smith's tutelage, Mathewson was a greatly improved pitcher in 1900. On May 1, 1900, after walking the first three batters and giving up five 1st inning runs in his first start for Norfolk, Mathewson was encouraged and supported by Smith, who gave up no more runs in a Norfolk 7–5 victory. Mathewson went on to have an 18–2 season in his time with the Phenoms. Mathewson made his New York Giants debut on July 18, 1900, going on to win 373 games for the Giants. The Giants signed Mathewson to a major league contract with a salary of $150.00 per month.

The Phenoms were succeeded in Norfolk by the 1901 Norfolk Skippers, who resumed minor league play as members of the Virginia–North Carolina League.

== The ballpark ==
The 1900 Norfolk Phenoms hosted home game at Bain Field, then known as "League Park." Just before the 1900 season, manager Phenomenal Smith, along with Norfolk businessman E. H. Cunningham, owner of the team, visited League Park and discovered much of the wooden slats of the outfield walls were taken for use as firewood. The ballpark was originally called "League Park " and newspaper coverage for baseball at the ballpark started as early as 1894.

== Year–by–year record ==
Year	Record	Finish	Manager	Playoffs/notes
1900	43–14	1st	Phenomenal Smith	League folded July 11; League champions

== Notable alumni ==
- Christy Mathewson (1900) Baseball Hall of Fame, Inducted 1936
- Phenomenal Smith (1900, MGR)
- Stub Smith (1900)
- Norfolk Phenoms players
