= Vern Freiburger =

American baseball player (1923–1990)

- First baseman
- Born: December 19, 1923; Detroit, Michigan, U.S.
- Died: February 27, 1990 (aged 66); Palm Springs, California, U.S.
- Batted: Right Threw: Left

MLB debut
- September 6, 1941, for the Cleveland Indians

Last MLB appearance
- September 15, 1941, for the Cleveland Indians

MLB statistics
- Games played: 2
- At bats: 8
- Hits: 1
- Stats at Baseball Reference

Teams
- Cleveland Indians (1941)

Vern Donald Freiburger (December 19, 1923 – February 27, 1990) was an American Major League Baseball (MLB) first baseman who played in two games for the Cleveland Indians on September 6 and September 15 during the 1941 season. At 17 years of age, he was the youngest player to appear in an American League game that season.

Born in Michigan, Freiburger was signed by the Cleveland Indians organization while still in high school. He played one season of minor league baseball, then was given a tryout on the major league roster. After spending 1942 in the minor leagues, he enlisted with the United States Navy to serve in World War II. Upon returning from military service, he returned to the minor leagues, but was no longer considered a major prospect for the Indians, and he proceeded to play in mostly the lower level minor leagues until 1952. Freiburger then retired to California and died in 1990.

== Early career and military service ==
Vern Donald Freiburger was born on December 19, 1923 in Detroit, Michigan. His amateur baseball career began at the age of 12, when he played for the amateur group of the Detroit Firemen's League; he played American Legion Baseball during this time as well. While playing sandlot ball for them, Freiburger was discovered by Indians scout Cy Slapnicka, and was signed to a contract with an invitation to spring training in 1941 at the age of 17. At the time, Freiburger was a student at Detroit Eastern High School with a year left until graduation, which he put on hold to pursue a professional baseball career. After spring training ended in 1941, he was sent to the Flint Arrows of the Michigan State League to gain some professional baseball experience. During his time with the Arrows, the team faced the Indians in an exhibition game which they won, 3–2. In the game, Freiburger had two runs batted in to give the team the win.

By the end of the minor league season, Indians farm club director Buzz Wetzel considered Freiburger to be nearly major-league ready, and found him to be one of the best hitters in the minor leagues that season. Freiburger made his major league debut a couple weeks later on September 6 in a doubleheader against the Detroit Tigers. He was 17 when he made his major league debut, the youngest player in the American League that season. In the game, he had a no hits in four at-bats. His second and final appearance in a game was against the New York Yankees at Yankee Stadium, where he had one hit and one run batted in. In 84 minor league games he had a batting average of .318 for the season.

Freiburger re-signed with the Indians organization in 1942 and joined the major league team for spring training in part due to the folding of the Michigan State League. In late March, before spring training had concluded, Freiburger was sent to the Cedar Rapids Raiders of the Three-I League, where he spent the 1942 season. In 115 games, he had a batting average of .301 and 23 doubles. The following season, the Indians had intended to make Freiburger part of the major league roster due to Hal Trosky's retirement making a hole at the first base position. Instead, he was called to serve in World War II, and he spent the next three years with the United States Navy.

== Later career and life ==
Upon returning from military service, Freiburger remained on the reserve list for the Indians, but was sent to the minor leagues to get back into baseball shape. He spent the 1946 season with the Charleston Rebels of the South Atlantic League and the Wilkes-Barre Barons of the Eastern League, where he played 69 total games and finished the year with a combined batting average of .222. The following year, he faced two other minor league players for the Wilkes-Barre starting first base job. He lost the position battle, and spent the season with the Concord Weavers of the North Carolina State League and the Rock Hill Chiefs of the Tri-State League, playing in 90 total games between the two teams. Freiburger began the 1948 season with Rock Hill, but was released shortly after the minor league season began. He then signed with the Suffolk Goobers of the Virginia League. He played in 128 games for the Goobers, and finished 1948 with a .294 batting average. After spending the start of 1949 with Suffolk, Freiburger joined the Emporia Nationals of the Virginia League. In his first game facing his old team in June, he had three runs batted in a 6–4 Emporia win. Freiburger was named to the Virginia League All-Star Team in 1949 and 1950. He remained with Emporia through the 1951 season when the Virginia League folded, and in his final year with the team was one of only three returning players.

Freiburger ended his professional baseball career in 1952 with the Palatka Azaleas of the Florida State League, playing in 14 games for the team. After retiring, Freiburger became a bus driver for Long Beach Public Transportation, and lived in California with his wife and three children. Freiburger died on February 27, 1990 in Palm Springs, California and was buried in the Good Shepherd Cemetery in Huntington Beach, California.
