= Lawrenceville Cardinals =

- 1948–1949; Lawrenceville, Virginia

Minor league affiliations
- Class: Class D (1948–1949)
- League: Virginia League (1948–1949)

Major league affiliations
- Team: St. Louis Cardinals (1948)

Minor league titles
- League titles (0): None
- Wild card berths (0): None

Team data
- Name: Lawrenceville Cardinals (1948) Lawrenceville Robins (1949)
- Ballpark: Lawrenceville City Stadium (1948–1949)

The Lawrenceville Cardinals were a minor league baseball team based in Lawrenceville, Virginia. In 1948 and 1949, Lawrenceville played as members of the Class D level Virginia League, with the team finishing last in both seasons of league play. The 1948 Cardinals were a minor league affiliate of the St. Louis Cardinals, with the team becoming the "Robins" in 1949.

Lawrenceville hosted minor league home games at Lawrenceville City Stadium, known today as Sonny Wholey Memorial Park.

== History ==
Beginning in 1935, the Lawrenceville "Green Sox" played as a local independent team. Lawrenceville had refused to host a team in the Virginia League, because the league played games on Saturday and Sunday.

In 1948, the Lawrenceville "Cardinals" became members of the reformed six–team, Class D level Virginia League. The Blackstone Barristers, Emporia Nationals, Franklin Cubs, Petersburg Generals and Suffolk Goobers teams joined Lawrenceville in beginning league play on April 23, 1948.

In 1948, the Cardinals played as a minor league affiliate of the St. Louis Cardinals.

After a poor start, the qualify of the Lawrenceville Cardinals roster was a topic of discussion at the April 28, 1948 Lawrenceville Chamber of Commerce meeting. L.J Lucy, who was chairman of the "baseball committee" reported that measures were being taken to improve the caliber of the team through "new help."

St. Louis Cardinals Baseball Hall of Fame players Enos Slaughter and Red Schoendienst had brothers who played for the 1948 Lawrenceville Cardinals. Joe Schoendienst and Robert Slaughter were members of the team, with Joe Schoendienst hitting .241 and Robert Slaughter .134.

In their first season of play, the Lawrenceville Cardinals finished last in the 1948 Virginia League regular season and had three managers during the season. The Cardinals ended the regular season with a record of 39–98, plccing sixth in the standings and ending the season 45.0 games behind the first place Suffolk Goobers. John Pruett, Bob Comiskey and George Shearin served as managers during the Cardinals' season. Hosting home games at City Stadium, the Cardinals were last in league total home attendance.

Lawrenceville played a final season as the "Robins" in 1949, with the team again finishing last in the six–team Virginia League regular season, playing under five managers. Lawrenceville finished the 1949 season with a record of 45–76, placing sixth in the Virginia League regular season standings. Playing under managers Claude Weaver, Glenn Titus, James Meyer, Garland Braxton and Walter Wholey, the Robins finished the regular season 31.5 games behind the first place Franklin Kildees in the regular season standings, missing the playoffs. Lawrenceville folded following the season, after finishing last in the league in home attendance.

The Virginia League continued play in 1950, with the Elizabeth City Albemarles franchise replacing Lawrenceville in the six-team league. Lawrenceville, Virginia has not hosted another minor league team.

== The ballpark ==
The Lawrenceville teams hosted home minor league home games at Lawrenceville City Stadium, which had a capacity of 2,100. The ballpark was built in 1935 and is still in use today. The ballpark lies within the Lawrenceville Historic District, which is on the National Register of Historic Places. The stadium was later named for Walter "Sonny" Wholey, who had managed the 1949 Robins. Wholey remained in Lawrenceville and became an educator and a youth coach. Today, the park is known as Sonny Wholey Memorial Park, located at 102 Tobacco Street in Lawrenceville.

== Timeline ==
Year(s)	# Yrs.	Team	Level	League	affiliate	Ballpark
1948	1	Lawrenceville Cardinals	Class D	Virginia League	St. Louis Cardinals	City Stadium
1949	1	Lawrenceville Robins	Class D	Virginia League	None	City Stadium

== Year–by–year records ==
Year	Record	Finish	Manager	Attend	Playoffs/Notes
1948	39–98	6th	John Pruett / Bob Comiskey / George Shearin	21,104	Did not qualify
1949	45–76	6th	Claude Weaver / Glenn Titus / James Meyer / Garland Braxton / Walter Wholey	29,000	Did not qualify

== Notable alumni ==
Garland Braxton (1949, MGR)
