= Historic Hicks Field =

Historic district in North Carolina, United States

- Hicks Field
- U.S. National Register of Historic Places
- U.S. Historic district
- Location within North Carolina Location within the United States
- Location: 111 E Freemason St, Edenton, North Carolina 27932
- Coordinates: 36°3′54″N 76°36′20″W
- Area: 3.5 acres (1.4 ha)
- Built: 1939
- Architect: Works Progress Administration
- NRHP reference No.: 95001050
- Added to NRHP: September 13, 1995

Historic Hicks Field is a historic baseball stadium and national historic district located in Edenton, North Carolina, (Chowan County). The stadium is home to the John A. Holmes High School Aces as well as the Edenton Steamers of the Coastal Plain League.

Hicks Field was a Works Progress Administration project in 1939 at the corner of East Freemason and Woodward, adjacent to John A. Holmes High School.

It was listed on the National Register of Historic Places in 1995.

The main structure is a wood grandstand with a roof that was built to accommodate slightly more than 500 people. The main grandstand is the oldest remaining wooden grandstand of its type in the state of North Carolina. Over the years, Hicks Field has been home to many minor league and semipro baseball teams, including the Edenton Colonials of the Virginia League in 1951, the original Coastal Plain League in 1952 and the semipro Albemarle League. Beginning in the 1930s, the Albemarle League was well known for high-level baseball as both top local players and college stars from around the region suited up for teams also representing Elizabeth City, Hertford, Colerain, Windsor and Williamston.

Hicks Field was also the longtime spring training site for a number of minor league teams during the 1940s, including Binghamton, New York, and Reading, Pennsylvania.

Players such as Bob Feller and other major league all-stars have set foot inside the historic stadium. In 1946, Hicks Field played host to arguably one of the best games of that era as an Albemarle League all-star team faced off against a major league all star team composed of players from the Pittsburgh Pirates, New York Yankees, Washington Senators and Chicago White Sox. The Albemarle team was defeated but for the 4,500 in attendance they were treated to some of the best players in all of baseball.

In 1997, Hicks Field underwent extensive renovations including a complete remodeling of the main grandstand behind home plate and the addition of two new grandstands; one down the first baseline and one down the third baseline as well. New bathrooms were built, as well as a manual wooden scoreboard that was placed in right field. Double decking the outfield fence in left field gave Hicks a "Fenway Park" feel. After all of the renovations were complete, Hicks Field grew in capacity to seat 1,200 people.

In 1998, the Edenton Steamers were formed in the new Coastal Plain League summer collegiate baseball league. Hicks Field continues to host the Steamers, Edenton-Holmes high school baseball, American Legion Post 40 contests, and various tournaments in the summer. In 2004 Baseball America rated Historic Hicks Field the #2 summer collegiate venue in the country.
