= Hampton Crabs =

- 1900; (1900, 1911); Hampton, Virginia

Minor league affiliations
- Class: Class D (1900, 1911)
- League: Virginia League (1900); Tidewater League (1911)

Major league affiliations
- Team: None

Minor league titles
- League titles (0): None

Team data
- Name: Hampton Crabs (1900); Hampton (1911)
- Ballpark: Unknown (1900, 1900)

The Hampton Crabs were a minor league baseball team based in Hampton, Virginia. In 1900, the Crabs played as members of the Class D level Virginia League, placing second as the league folded during the season. The Crabs were succeeded by the 1911 Hampton team of the Tidewater League, who also finished in second place in the league standings.

== History ==
The 1900 Hampton "Crabs" began play as members of the six–team, Class D level Virginia League. Hampton joined the Newport News Shipbuilders, Norfolk Phenoms, Petersburg Farmers, Portsmouth Boers and Richmond Bluebirds teams in beginning league play on April 30, 1900.

The Hampton "Crabs' nickname corresponds to local industry, history and geography. Located on Chesapeake Bay, Hampton became known as "Crabtown" as the local seafood industry flourished, beginning after the conclusion of the Civil War.

On July 11, 1900, the Virginia League folded. The Hampton Crabs placed second in the Atlantic League standings in the shortened season. When the league folded, the Crabs ended the season with a record of 29–29, playing the season under player/manager Ed Ashenback. Hampton finished 14.0 games behind the first place Norfolk Phenoms, with Christy Mathewson, in the final standings.

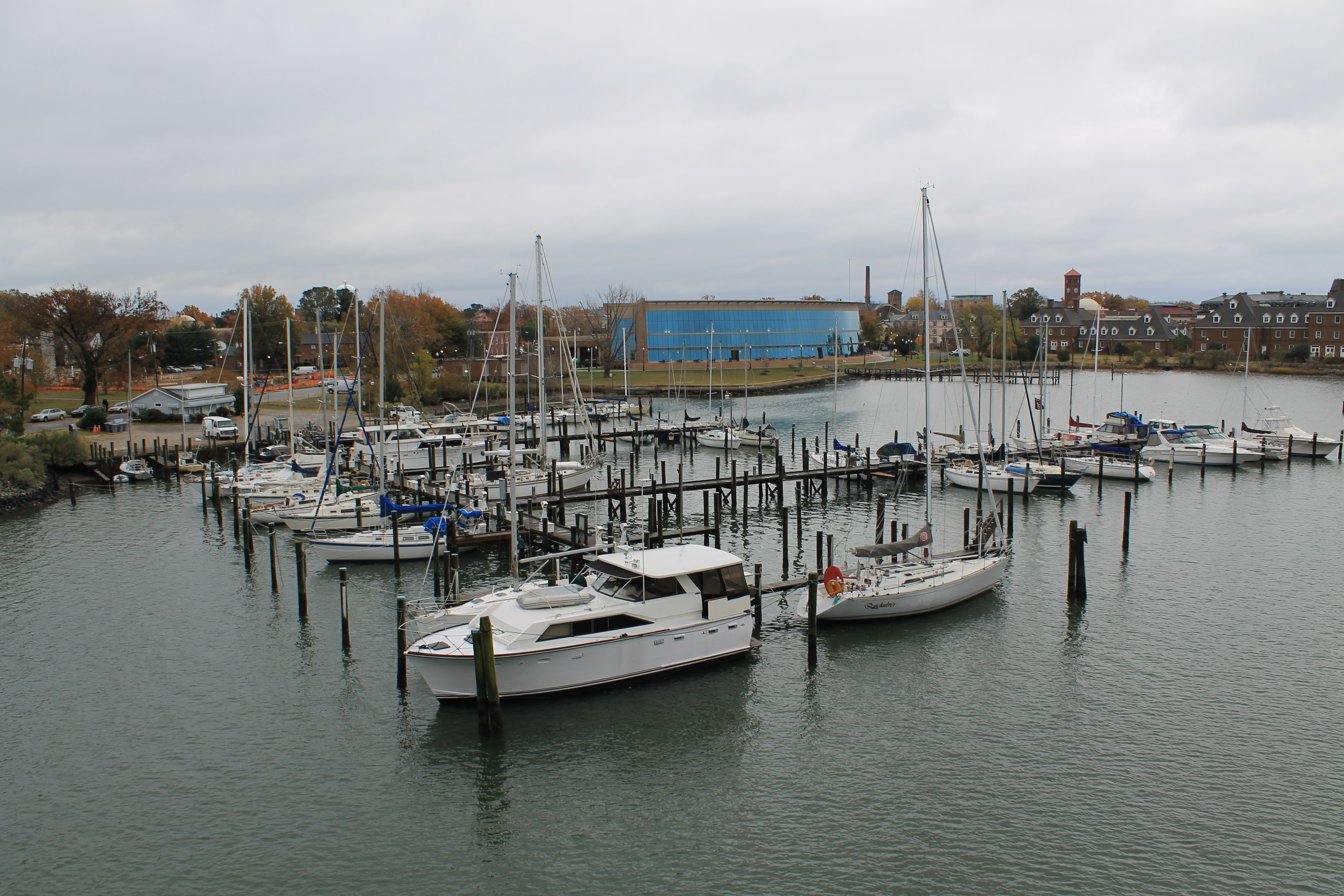
(2012) Hampton Marinas

The Crabs were succeeded by the 1911 "Hampton" team, who resumed minor league play as members of the Class D level Tidewater League. Hampton began play with the Tidewater League on May 11, 1911. The six–team league was composed of charter teams, all without known monikers, representing Elizabeth City, North Carolina and the Virginia cities of Hampton, Newport News, Old Point Comfort, Portsmouth and Suffolk. Elizabeth City and Portsmouth then folded during the season.

The Tidewater League regular season ended on August 1, 1911, with Hampton in second place, playing under manager Steve Griffin. Suffolk finished with a regular season record of 16–5 to claim the Tidewater League Championship. They were followed by Hampton (11–9), Elizabeth City (8–5), Newport News (10–11), Old Point Comfort (7–13) and Portsmouth (4–12) in the league standings.

The Tidewater League permanently folded after the 1911 season. In 1948, the Newport News Dodgers began play at War Memorial Stadium in Hampton, where they played through 1955. Hampton next hosted a minor league team at the stadium when the 1963 Peninsula Senators began play as members of the Class A level Carolina League.

== The ballpark ==
The name of home ballpark for the Hampton minor league teams in 1900 and 1911 is not directly referenced. It is known in the era, that the 1895 and 1896 Philadelphia Phillies held spring training at the National Home for Disabled Volunteer Soldiers in Hampton. The team utilized the Hampton Soldiers' Home athletic grounds, located 300 yards from the team hotel on the property.

== Timeline ==
Year(s)	# Yrs.	Team	Level	League
1900	1	Hampton Crabs	Class D	Virginia League
1911	1	Hampton	Class D	Tidewater League

== Year–by–year records ==
Year	Record	Finish	Manager	Playoffs/notes
1900	29–29	2nd	Ed Ashenback	League folded July 11
1911	11-9	2nd	Steve Griffin	No playoffs held

== Notable alumni ==
- Jim Adams (1900)
- Reddy Foster (1900)
- Ed High (1900)
- Bill Richardson (1900)
- Hampton Crabs players
