= Holmes High School =

Holmes High School may refer to:

- Holmes Junior/Senior High School in Covington, Kentucky
- John A. Holmes High School in Edenton, North Carolina

== See also ==
- Oliver Wendell Holmes High School, San Antonio, Texas
