= Suffolk Goobers =

- 1948–1951; (1915, 1919-1921m 1948-1951); Suffolk, Virginia

Minor league affiliations
- Class: Class C (1915, 1919-1920); Class B (1921); Class D (1948–1951)
- League: Virginia League (1915, 1919-1921); Virginia League V (1948–1951)

Major league affiliations
- Team: None

Minor league titles
- League titles (0): None
- Conference titles (1): 1948
- Wild card berths (2): 1949; 1951

Team data
- Name: Suffolk Tigers (1915); Suffolk Nuts (1919-1920); Suffolk Wildcats (1921); Suffolk Goobers (1948–1951)
- Ballpark: Peanut Park (1915, 1919-1921, 1948–1951)

The Suffolk Goobers were a minor league baseball team based in Suffolk, Virginia. From 1948 to 1951, the "Goobers" played as members of the Class D level Virginia League, winning the 1948 league pennant. The Goobers were preceded in Virginia League play by Suffolk teams who played in the 1915 and from 1919 to 1921 seasons.

Spanning 36 years, the Suffolk Virginia League teams all hosted minor league home games at Peanut Park in Suffolk.

== History ==
=== 1915, 1919 to 1921: Virginia League ===
After Suffolk folk first hosted minor league baseball with the 1911 Suffolk championship team of the Tidewater League, the "Nuts" were preceded in minor league play by the 1915 Suffolk Tigers of the Class C level Virginia League. The Tigers finished the 1915 season in fifth place in the six-team league with a record of 59-62. The Suffolk Tigers folded from the Virginia League following the 1915 season, replaced in 1916 league play by the Hopewell Powder Puffs.

In 1919, the Suffolk "Nuts" rejoined the Virginia League, which was a six–team, Class C level league. The Newport News Shipbuilders, Norfolk Tars, Petersburg Goobers, Portsmouth Truckers and Richmond Colts joined Suffolk in beginning league play on May 8, 1919.

The Suffolk use of the "Nuts" moniker corresponded with local peanut agriculture and production in the city. Suffolk was self–nicknamed as the "Peanut Capitol of the World." The team played home games at Peanut Park, located next to the Suffolk Peanut Company.

In their first season of play, the Suffolk Nuts placed fifth in the Virginia League final standings. The Nuts ended the regular season with a record of 49–58, finishing 12.0 games behind the first place Petersburg Goobers. The league did not hold playoffs. Rube Oldring served as the Suffolk manager.

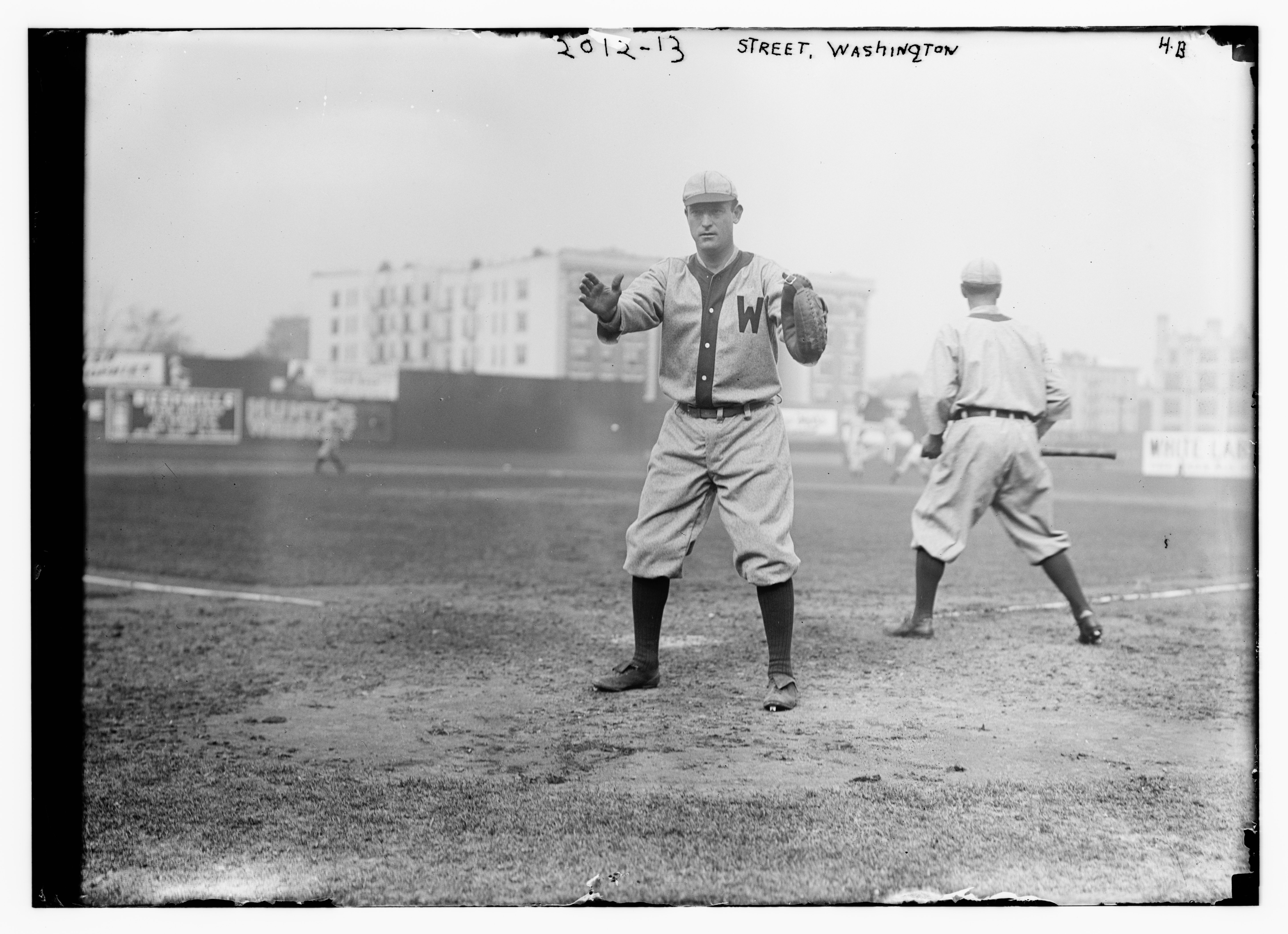
(1910) Gabby Street, Washington Senators, Street managed Suffolk in 1920 and 1921 and played for the 1915 team.

Playing the 1920 season under manager Gabby Street, who had played for Suffolk in 1915, the Nuts placed seventh as the Virginia League expanded to eight teams. Street would later manage the 1931 St. Louis Cardinals to the World Series championship and become a longtime Cardinals radio announcer. Under Street, Suffolk ended the 1920 season with a record of 47–69 in the Virginia League season standings. The Nuts finished the season 30.0 games behind the first place Richmond Colts in the final standings.

In 1921, Suffolk became known as the "Wildcats," as the Virginia League was upgraded to become a Class B level league and held a playoff for the first time. The Suffolk Wildcats ended the Virginia League regular season in sixth place with a record of 59–78, finishing 20.5 games behind the first place Portsmouth Truckers in the eight-team league. Managed by the returning Gabby Street and Bill Cunningham, Suffolk did not qualify for the playoff, won by Portsmouth over the Norfolk.

The Virginia League reduced from eight teams to six for the 1922 season, and the Suffolk franchise was folded, along with the Tarboro Tarbabies. Suffolk, Virginia next hosted minor league baseball when the 1948 Suffolk Goobers returned to play when the Virginia League reformed.

=== 1948 to 1951: Goobers in Virginia League ===
In 1948, minor league play in the Virginia resumed, as the Suffolk "Goobers" were formed and followed the previous Suffolk team, the 1921 Suffolk Wildcats.

The 1948 Suffolk Goobers became members of the reformed Virginia League, which formed as a six–team, Class D level league. The Blackstone Barristers, Emporia Nationals, Franklin Cubs, Lawrenceville Cardinals and Petersburg Generals teams joined with Suffolk in beginning league play on April 23, 1948.

The Suffolk use of the "Goobers" moniker corresponds with peanut agriculture in the region in the era. Suffolk was self–nicknamed as the "Peanut Capitol of the World." The term was known to be used as a nickname for peanuts.

In their first season of play, the Suffolk Goobers won the 1948 Virginia League pennant. The Goobers ended the regular season with a record of 83–52, finishing 1st in the standings, 7.5 games ahead of the 2nd place Blackstone Barristers. Bill Steinecke served as manager in leading the team to the league pennant. In the 1st round of the four–team playoffs, the Petersburg Generals defeated Suffolk 4 games to 2, ending their season. Pitcher Cecil Hutson of Suffolk led the league with 23 wins.

Playing under returning manager Bill Steineke and Paul Badgett, the Goobers qualified for the 1949 Virginia League playoffs. Suffolk finished the 1949 season with a record of 57–65, placing 4th in the Virginia League regular season standings. The Goobers finished the regular season 20.0 games behind the 1st place Franklin Kildees. In the playoffs, Franklin defeated the Goobers 4 games to 1.

In 1950, the Suffolk Goobers placed 6th in the Virginia League regular season standings, missing the playoffs. With a record of 50–79, Suffolk ended the regular season in last place, with the Goobers playing under manager Buster Kinard. Suffolk finished 21.5 games behind the 1st place Emporia Nationals.

In their final season, the 1951 Goobers returned to the playoffs with a 4th place finish in the league standings. The Suffolk Goobers ended the Virginia League regular season with a record of 56–62, finishing 23.5 games behind the 1st place Colonial Heights-Petersburg Generals. In the playoffs, Colonial Heights-Petersburg defeated Suffolk Goobers 4 games to 1, in the last games for the franchises. Buster Kinard of Suffolk won the league batting title, hitting .378.

The Virginia League permanently folded as a minor league following the 1951 season. Suffolk, Virginia has not hosted another minor league team.

== The ballpark ==
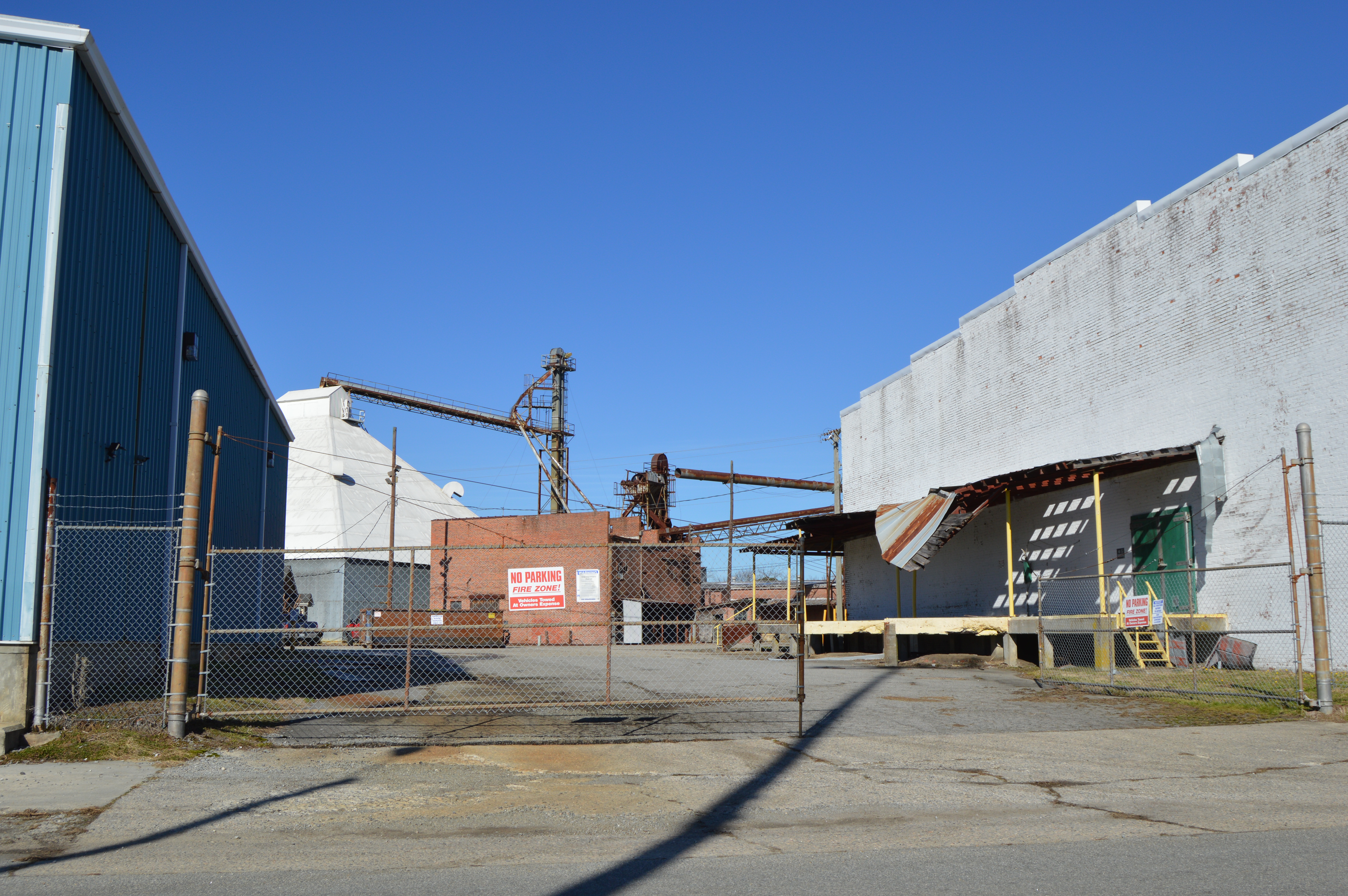
(2018) Suffolk Peanut Company complex. National Register of Historic Places. Suffolk, Virginia

The Suffolk Virginia teams all hosted home minor league home games at Peanut Park. The ballpark was located next to the Suffolk Peanut Company, giving it its name. In its history, the site was also known as Smith Street Park, Athletic Park and League Park, with the capacity being expanded from 2,500 in 1948 to 5,000 in 1950. Peanut Park is still in use today as a public park with a ballfield. The park is located at 308 South Saratoga Street in Suffolk, Virginia.

== Timeline ==
Year(s)	# Yrs.	Team	Level	League	Ballpark
1915	1	Suffolk Tigers	Class C	Virginia League	Peanut Park
1919-1920	2	Suffolk Nuts	Class C	Virginia League	Peanut Park
1921	1	Suffolk Wildcats	Class B	Virginia League	Peanut Park
1948–1951	4	Suffolk Goobers	Class D	Virginia League	Peanut Park

== Year–by–year records ==
Year	Record	Finish	Manager	Playoffs/Notes
1915	59–62	5th	Harry Welcher / George Kelly	No playoffs held
1919	49–58	5th	Rube Oldring	No playoffs held
1920	47–69	7th	Gabby Street	No playoffs held
1921	59–78	6th	Gabby Street / Bill Cunningham	Did not qualify
1948	83–52	1st	Bill Steinecke	Won league pennant Lost in 1st round
1949	57–65	4th	Paul Badgett / Bill Steinecke	Lost in 1st round
1950	50–79	6th	Buster Kinard	Did not qualify
1951	56–62	4th	Red Treadway	Lost in 1st round

== Notable alumni ==
- Johnny Berger (1919)
- Bill Black (1920-1921)
- Dennis Burns (1921)
- Bill Cunningham (1921, MGR)
- Charlie Eckert (1919-1920)
- Vern Freiburger (1948–1949)
- George Gilham (1919)
- Eddie Kasko (1950)
- Emmett McCann (1919)
- Jake Munch (1919)
- Joe Munson (1919)
- Rube Oldring (1919, MGR) Philadelphia Baseball Wall of Fame
- William Pierson (1919)
- Red Proctor (1920)
- Bill Steinecke (1948–1948, MGR)
- Gabby Street (1915; 1920–1921, MGR) Manager: 1931 World Series Champion St. Louis Cardinals
- Red Treadway (1951, MGR)
- Suffolk Nuts players
- Suffolk Tigers players
- Suffolk Wildcats players
- Suffolk Goobers players
