= Tidewater League =

American minor league baseball league

- Classification: Class D (1911)
- Sport: Minor League Baseball
- First season: 1911
- Folded: August 1, 1911
- President: William H. Hannan, Jr. (1911)
- No. of teams: 6
- Country: United States of America
- Most titles: 1 Suffolk (1911)

The Tidewater League was a minor league baseball league that played in the 1911 season. The Class D level Tidewater League consisted of six teams based in North Carolina and Virginia. The Suffolk team won the 1911 league championship in a shortened season.

== History ==
The Tidewater League began play on May 11, 1911 as a Class D level league. The league president was William H. Hannan, Jr. The six–team league was composed of charter teams, all without monikers, representing Elizabeth City, North Carolina and the Virginia cities of Hampton, Newport News, Old Point Comfort, Portsmouth and Suffolk.

In the only season of league play, the Tidewater League regular season ended on August 1, 1911. Suffolk finished with a regular season record of 16–5 to claim the Tidewater League Championship. They were followed by Elizabeth City (8–5), Hampton (11–9), Newport News (10–11), Old Point Comfort (7–13) and Portsmouth (4–12) in the league standings.

Portsmouth folded on July 22, 1911. Elizabeth City folded on July 30, 1911. The Tidewater League permanently folded in their only season of play in 1911, ending play on August 1, 1911.

== 1911 Tidewater League teams ==
| Team name(s) | City represented | Ballpark | Year(s) active |
|---|---|---|---|
| Elizabeth City | Elizabeth City, North Carolina | Unknown | 1911 |
| Hampton | Hampton, Virginia | Unknown | 1911 |
| Newport News | Newport News, Virginia | Horowitz Field | 1911 |
| Old Point Comfort | Old Point, Virginia | Unknown | 1911 |
| Portsmouth | Portsmouth, Virginia | Unknown | 1911 |
| Suffolk | Suffolk, Virginia | Unknown | 1911 |

== 1911 Tidewater League overall standings ==
| Team standings | W | L | PCT | GB | Managers |
|---|---|---|---|---|---|
| Suffolk | 16 | 5 | .761 | – | Thomas Guiheen |
| Elizabeth City* | 8 | 5 | .615 | 4½ | Earl Holt |
| Hampton | 11 | 9 | .550 | 6 | Steve Griffin |
| Newport News | 10 | 11 | .476 | 7 | Hugh Shannon |
| Old Point Comfort | 7 | 13 | .350 | 8½ | Ducky Holmes |
| Portsmouth* | 4 | 10 | .333 | 12 | Dad Clark |
