= Petersburg Sports Complex =

Athletic venue in Petersburg, Virginia, US

Coordinates: 37.181944°N 77.394937°W

The Petersburg Sports Complex is a multi-purpose athletic venue located in Petersburg, Virginia, United States. The facility includes four softball and one baseball field, the latter which seats 2,500. In addition to the field, the facility features a concession stand, restrooms, press boxes, offices, a public address system, and a scoreboard. The baseball field is currently home to the Richard Bland College baseball team, as well as the Petersburg High School baseball team, and was formerly home to the Petersburg Generals of the Coastal Plain League, a collegiate summer baseball league.

The baseball field's dimensions are 320 ft. down the lines, 350 ft. to the gaps, and 375 ft. to dead center field.
