= Blackstone Barristers =

- 1948; Blackstone, Virginia

Minor league affiliations
- Class: Class D (1948)
- League: Virginia League (1948)

Major league affiliations
- Team: New York Yankees (1948)

Minor league titles
- League titles (1): 1948
- Wild card berths (1): 1948

Team data
- Name: Blackstone Barristers (1948)
- Ballpark: Blackstone Stadium (1948)

The Blackstone Barristers were a minor league baseball team based in Emporia, Virginia. In 1948, the Barristers were a New York Yankees affiliate and played the season as members of the Class D level Virginia League, winning the league championship. In their only season of minor league play, Blackstone hosted minor league home games at the Blackstone Stadium.

== History ==
In 1947, the Washington Senators, St. Louis Cardinals and New York Yankees were interested in expanding their minor league affiliations and turning the semipro Virginia League into a minor league, which proved to be successful.

In 1948, the Blackstone "Barristers" became members of the Virginia League, which reformed as a six–team, Class D level league. The Emporia Nationals, Franklin Cubs, Lawrenceville Cardinals, Petersburg Generals and Suffolk Goobers joined Blackstone in beginning league play on April 23, 1948. Emporia and Lawrenceville were also minor league affiliates, of the Washington Senators and St. Louis Cardinals respectively. The Blackstone Barristers began play as a minor league affiliate of the New York Yankees.

The "Barristers" nickname lies in local history. Blackstone, Virginia is named for William Blackstone, who was a barrister.

In their only season of play, the Barristers won the 1948 Virginia League championship. The Nationals ended the regular season with a record of 78–62, placing 2nd in the regular season standings, finishing 7.5 games behind the first place Suffolk Goobers. Paul Badgett served as player/manager, hitting .340 with 23 home runs. In the playoffs, the Barristers swept the Franklin Cubs in four games to advance. In the Finals, the Blackstone Barristers defeated the Petersburg Generals in a seven game series, winning the final game to secure the championship. It was the final game played by the franchise. Blackstone pitcher Al Tefft led the league with a 21–1 record and 1.57 ERA.

In the 1949 Virginia League, the Blackstone did not return to the Virginia League, as the New York Yankees ended their affiliation agreement with Blackstone. The Barristers were replaced by the Hopewell Blue Sox franchise. In 1949, Emporia continued as the only Virginia League team with a major league affiliation.

The Virginia League eventually folded as a minor league following the 1951 season. Blackstone, Virginia has not hosted another minor league team.

== The ballpark ==
The Blackstone Barristers hosted 1948 home minor league home games at Blackstone Stadium. The ballpark was located at Lester Street & Jackson Street, adjacent to Blackstone High School and Blackstone Junior High School. Today, the site is still in use as a ballpark and is home to the Wigglesworth Stadium complex, located at 617 South Harris Street.

== Year–by–year record ==
Year	Record	Finish	Manager	Attend	Playoffs
1948	78–62	2nd	Paul Badgett	37,632	League champions

== Notable alumni ==
- Wally Burnette (1948)
- Blackstone Barristers players
