= Bain Field =

Former baseball ground in Norfolk, Virginia

Bain Field or Norfolk Baseball Park is a former baseball ground located at 400 East 20th Street near Church Street in Norfolk, Virginia. It had about 8,000 seats.

== History ==
Bain Field was originally League Park. The date League Park was formed is unknown, but newspaper coverage for baseball games there started as early as 1894, although possibly at a different location in Norfolk. Player-manager Phenomenal Smith of the newly formed Norfolk Mary Janes along with Norfolk businessman E. H. Cunningham, owner of the team, visited League Park before the 1900 season, and discovered much of the wooden slats of the outfield walls were taken for use as firewood. The park was partially destroyed by a fire on August 8, 1930. It became Bain Field in 1931 after it was rebuilt post fire. It was demolished in 1940 after becoming in disrepair. R. F. Bain controlled the park.

It was the home field of the Norfolk Mary Janes and the Norfolk Tars. The Norfolk Tars changed to Myers Field in 1940.

The park was also used for college football games. The Norfolk Division of College of William & Mary, now Old Dominion University, played its home games at Bain Field until they constructed their own field in 1931.

The United States Navy used it for football games against other military services.

== Norfolk Mary Janes ==
The Norfolk Mary Janes was a minor league baseball team in the second Virginia League in 1900 and in the third Virginia League from 1919 to 1920. Their home field was League Park.
