= Virginia League (1900) =

- Formerly: Virginia League (1894–96)
- Classification: Class D (1900)
- Sport: Minor League Baseball
- First season: 1900
- Folded: 1900
- Replaced by: Virginia-North Carolina League (1901); Virginia League (1906–1924)
- President: Jake Wells (1900); E.Harvie Cunningham (1900); John Brady (1900)
- No. of teams: 6
- Country: United States of America
- Most titles: 1 Norfolk Phenoms (1900)

The Virginia League was a Class D level minor baseball league based in Virginia that played in the 1900 season. It was the second formation of the "Virginia League," succeeding the first edition of the Virginia League (1894–96) and preceding the Virginia League (1906–1928).

The 1900 Virginia League was composed entirely of teams from Virginia. The six–team league consisted of the Norfolk Mary Janes, Portsmouth Pirates, Newport News Shipbuilders and Richmond Colts, as well as teams in Hopewell and Petersburg.

In June, both the Petersburg and Richmond teams disbanded during the season. Following the 1900 season, the league became the Virginia-North Carolina League.

Baseball Hall of Fame member Christy Mathewson pitched for the Norfolk Phenoms in 1900, leading Virginia League in both wins and strikeouts.

== 1900 cities represented ==
- Hampton, VA: Hampton Crabs
- Newport News, VA: Newport News Shipbuilders
- Norfolk, VA: Norfolk Phenoms
- Petersburg, VA: Petersburg Farmers
- Portsmouth, VA: Portsmouth Boers
- Richmond, VA: Richmond Bluebirds

== Standings & statistics ==
1900 Virginia League

Team standings	W	L	PCT	GB	Managers
Norfolk Phenoms	43	14	.754	-	Phenomenal Smith
Hampton Crabs	29	29	.500	14	Edward Ashenbach
Portsmouth Boers	29	30	.492	14½	Pete Weckbecker / Win Clark
Newport News Shipbuilders	23	39	.371	22	Hunter Harvey / Michael Trost; Kid Weaver
Richmond Bluebirds	21	15	.583	NA	Charles Boyer / Harry Berte
Petersburg Farmers	8	26	.235	NA	Fred Foster / George Kelly

Petersburg disbanded June 11; Richmond disbanded June 13.

Player statistics
Player	Team	Stat	Tot	Player	Team	Stat	Tot
Jim Murray	Portsmouth	BA	.337	Christy Mathewson	Norfolk	W	18
Jim Murray	Portsmouth	Runs	66	Christy Mathewson	Norfolk	SO	121
Jim Murray	Portsmouth	Hits	126	Christy Mathewson	Norfolk	PCT	.900 18-2
Jim Murray	Portsmouth	RBI	98				
Jim Murray	Portsmouth	HR	11				
