= Virginia League (1948–1951) =

- Formerly: Virginia League (1939-1942)
- Classification: Class D (1948–1951)
- Sport: Minor League Baseball
- First season: 1948
- Folded: 1951
- President: Robert S. Brenaman (1948–1950); Benjamin L. Campbell (1951)
- No. of teams: 10
- Country: United States of America
- Most titles: 1; 1948: Blackstone Barristers; 1949: Petersburg Generals; 1950: Emporia Nationals; 1951: Elizabeth City Albemarles

The Virginia League of 1948–1951 was a Class D level American minor baseball league. The league was the final of five incarnations of professional baseball circuits to be known by that name dating to 1894. The post-World War II league revived the previous incarnation of the Virginia League that had ceased operation after concluding the 1942 season.

== History ==
The 1948–1951 Virginia League played each of its four seasons as a six-team league. The Virginia League headquarters were in Petersburg, with teams in North Carolina and Virginia. The Washington Senators of the American League (who used Nationals as one of their nicknames for many years) sponsored the Emporia club from 1948 to 1950. The New York Yankees (Blackstone) and St. Louis Cardinals (Lawrenceville) also had affiliates in the Virginia League in 1948.

Among the future Major Leaguer players who played in the Virginia League of 1948–1951, a future All-Star was shortstop Eddie Kasko, a member of the 1961 National League squad (and a future MLB manager and executive), who played for the 1950 Suffolk Goobers.

== 1948–1951 Virginia League cities represented ==
- Blackstone, VA: Blackstone Barristers 1948
- Colonial Heights, VA & Petersburg, VA: Colonial Heights-Petersburg Generals 1951
- Edenton, NC: Edenton Colonials 1951
- Elizabeth City, NC: Elizabeth City Albemarles 1950–1951
- Emporia, VA: Emporia Nationals 1948–1950; Emporia Rebels 1951
- Franklin, VA: Franklin Cubs 1948; Franklin Kildees 1949–1951
- Hopewell, VA: Hopewell Blue Sox 1949–1950
- Lawrenceville, VA: Lawrenceville Cardinals 1948; Lawrenceville Robins 1949
- Petersburg, VA: Petersburg Generals 1948–1950
- Suffolk, VA: Suffolk Goobers 1948–1951

== Standings & statistics ==
1948 Virginia League

Team standings	W	L	PCT	GB	Attend	Managers
Suffolk Goobers	83	52	.615	-	60,873	Bill Steinecke
Blackstone Barristers	78	62	.557	7½	37,632	Paul Badgett
Franklin Cubs	76	64	.543	9½	54,867	John Zontini
Petersburg Generals	73	62	.541	10	116,062	Paul Varner
Emporia Nationals	63	74	.460	21	33,415	Morrie Aderholt
Lawrenceville Cardinals	39	98	.285	45	21,104	Robert Comiskey; George Shearin / John Pruett

Playoffs: Petersburg 4 games, Suffolk 2; Blackstone 4 games, Franklin 0.
Finals: Blackstone 4 games, Petersburg 3.

Player Statistics
Player	Team	Stat	Tot	Player	Team	Stat	Tot
Morrie Aderholt	Emporia	BA	.394	Cecil Hutson	Suffolk	W	23
Art Jacobs	Franklin	Runs	147	George Blair	Petersburg	W	23
Morrie Aderholt	Emporia	Hits	185	George Blair	Petersburg	SO	212
Vernon Shetler	Franklin	RBI	150	Al Tefft	Blackstone	ERA	1.57
Morrie Aderholt	Emporia	HR	31	Al Tefft	Blackstone	PCT	.955 21-1

1949 Virginia League

Team standings	W	L	PCT	GB	Attend	Managers
Franklin Kildees	80	48	.625	-	54,282	George Lacy
Petersburg Generals	72	54	.571	7	76,000	Paul Varner
Emporia Nationals	67	55	.549	10	29,050	Morrie Aderholt
Suffolk Goobers	57	65	.467	20	41,381	Bill Steinecke / Paul Badgett
Hopewell Blue Sox	52	75	.409	27½	39,600	Joe Mills
Lawrenceville Robins	45	76	.372	31½	29,000	Garland Braxton / James Myers / Glenn Titus / Claude Weaver / Walter Wholey

Playoffs: Franklin 4 games, Suffolk 1; Petersburg 4 games, Emporia 3.
Finals: Petersburg 4 games, Franklin 2.

Player statistics
Player	Team	Stat	Tot	Player	Team	Stat	Tot
Paul Varner	Petersburg	BA	.355	Arnold Atkins	Franklin	W	21
John Cornwell	Franklin	Runs	129	Arnold Atkins	Franklin	SO	204
James Gillette	Franklin	Hits	181	Arnold Atkins	Franklin	ERA	2.70
James Gillette	Franklin	RBI	118	Jim Cornett	Petersburg	PCT	.706 12-5
John Garrison]	Emporia	HR	25				

1950 Virginia League

Team standings	W	L	PCT	GB	Attend	Managers
Emporia Nationals	71	57	.555	-	26,380	Morrie Aderholt
Petersburg Generals	69	61	.531	3	43,508	Paul Varner
Elizabeth City Albemarles	68	61	.527	3½	35,000	Paul Crawford
Hopewell Blue Sox	65	65	.500	7	29,320	Herbert Moore
Franklin Kildees	65	65	.500	7	30,249	Paul Badgett
Suffolk Goobers	50	79	.388	21½	28,638	Buster Kinard

Playoffs:Hopewell defeated Franklin by forfeit for fourth place. Emporia 4 games, Hopewell 1; Petersburg 4 games, Elizabeth City 2.
Finals: Emporia 4 games, Petersburg 2.

Player Statistics
Player	Team	Stat	Tot	Player	Team	Stat	Tot
Paul Varner	Petersburg	BA	.335	Vernon Holland	Franklin	W	20
LeRoy Dietzel	Emporia	Runs	121	Melvin Doxtator	Emporia	W	20
John Garrison	Emporia	Hits	170	Herman Dowdy	Elizabeth City	SO	176
Ken Hatcher	Petersburg	RBI	120	Eugene Hoberg	Franklin	ERA	2.50
Ken Hatcher	Petersburg	HR	32	Edmond McClosky	Petersburg	PCT	.765 13-4

1951 Virginia League

Team standings	W	L	PCT	GB	Attend	Managers
Colonial Heights-Petersburg Generals	80	39	.672	-	35,146	Turkey Tyson
Elizabeth City Albemarles	67	50	.573	12	34,301	Paul Crawford
Edenton Colonials	63	55	.534	16½	28,528	Gashouse Parker
Suffolk Goobers	56	62	.475	23½	26,000	Red Treadway
Franklin Kildees	49	70	.412	31	18,299	Carl McQuillen / Awood Holland
Emporia Rebels	39	78	.333	40	12,000	Joe Mills / Harold Martin

Playoffs: Colonial Heights-Petersburg 4 games, Suffolk 1; Elizabeth City 4 games, Edenton 3.
Finals: Elizabeth City 4 games, Colonial Heights-Petersburg 1.

Player statistics
Player	Team	Stat	Tot	Player	Team	Stat	Tot
Buster Kinard	Suffolk	BA	.378	John Brockwell	Colonial Heights/Petersburgh	W	25
Ken Hatcher	Colonial/Peters	Runs	109	John Brockwell	Colonial Heights/Petersburgh	SO	164
Buster Kinard	Suffolk	Hits	156	John Brockwell	Colonial Height/Petersburgh	ERA	2.05
Ken Hatcher	Colonial/Peters	RBI	121	John Brockwell	Colonial Height/Petersburgh	PCT	.781 25-7
Ken Hatcher	Colonial/Peters	HR	34				
