= Jim Murray (outfielder) =

American baseball player (1878-1945)

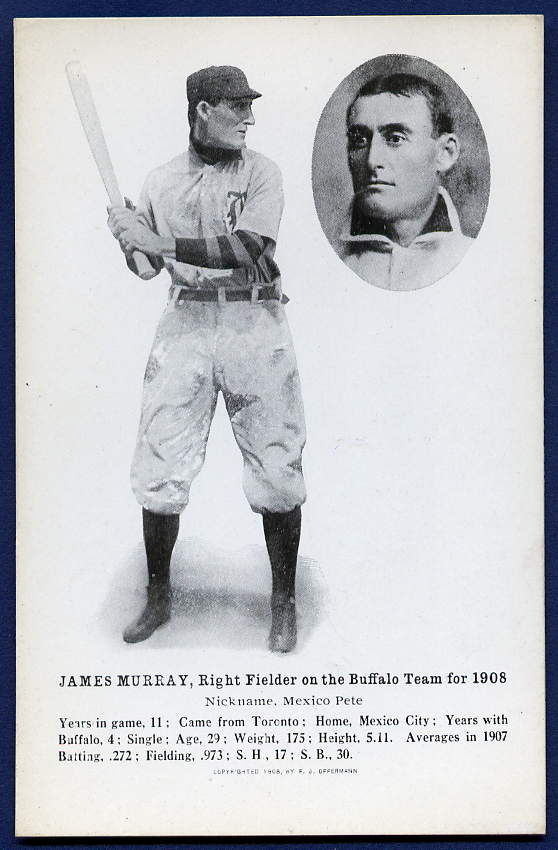
- Outfielder
- Born: January 16, 1878; Galveston, Texas, U.S.
- Died: April 25, 1945 (aged 67); Galveston, Texas, U.S.
- Batted: Right Threw: Left

MLB debut
- September 2, 1902, for the Chicago Orphans

Last MLB appearance
- July 10, 1914, for the Boston Braves

MLB statistics
- Batting average: .203
- Home runs: 3
- Runs batted in: 24
- Stats at Baseball Reference

Teams
- Chicago Orphans (1902); St. Louis Browns (1911); Boston Braves (1914)

James Oscar Murray (January 16, 1878 – April 25, 1945) was an American Major League Baseball outfielder from 1902–1914.
