= Emporia Nationals =

- 1948–1950; (1948–1951); Emporia, Virginia

Minor league affiliations
- Class: Class D (1948–1951)
- League: Virginia League (1948–1951)

Major league affiliations
- Team: Washington Senators (1948–1950)

Minor league titles
- League titles (1): 1950
- Conference titles (1): 1950
- Wild card berths (1): 1949

Team data
- Name: Emporia Nationals (1948–1950); Emporia Rebels (1951)
- Ballpark: Slagle Stadium (1948–1951)

The Emporia Nationals were a minor league baseball team based in Emporia, Virginia. From 1948 to 1951, Emporia played as members of the Class D level Virginia League, winning the 1950 league Championship. The Emporia Nationals were a minor league affiliate of the Washington Senators (today's Minnesota Twins). The team played as the "Rebels" in 1951, with Emporia hosting minor league home games at Slagle Stadium.

== History ==
In 1947, the Washington Senators had the fewest number of minor league affiliates (6) and scouts (3) of any major-league team. Owner Clark Griffith named former player Ossie Bluege as Farm Director and expanded the Washington system to 11 minor league affiliates and 7 scouts in 1948. One of Bluege’s goals was to establish a Class D level affiliate in the Middle Atlantic region, when several other teams were seeking to turn the semipro Virginia League into a minor league, which proved to be successful. Local businessman Eugene Bloom was instrumental in reaching an agreement with the Senators to place a team in Emporia. Griffith then named Bloom as business manager of the Emporia team.

In 1948, the Emporia "Nationals" became members of the Virginia League, which reformed as a six–team, Class D level league. The Blackstone Barristers, Franklin Cubs, Lawrenceville Cardinals, Petersburg Generals and Suffolk Goobers teams joined Emporia in beginning league play on April 23, 1948.

The Emporia Nationals began play as a minor league affiliate of the Washington Senators. The franchise would continue the affiliation through the 1950 season.

In their first season of play, the Emporia Nationals missed the 1948 Virginia League playoffs. The Nationals ended the regular season with a record of 63–74, placing 5th in the standings, finishing 21.0 games behind the first place Suffolk Goobers. Morrie Aderholt served as player/manager, his first of three seasons as player/manager. Aderholt won the league batting title with a .387 batting average and hit a league leading 31 home runs.

In their second season, the Nationals qualified for the Virginia League playoffs in 1949. Playing under returning manager Morrie Aderholt, Emporia ended the 1949 season with a record of 67–55 and placed third the regular season standings, finishing 10.0 games behind the first place Franklin Kildees. Emporia was the only league team with a major league affiliation in 1949, after the league had three in 1948. In the 1st round of the playoffs, the Petersburg Generals defeated the Nationals in seven games. John Garrison of Emporia led the league with 25 home runs.

Just before the start of the regular season, Emporia pitchers Bert Roseberry and Ralph Fraser were both killed in an automobile accident. Their deaths occurred during spring training on April 15, 1950, two weeks before opening day.

The 1950 Emporia Nationals won the Virginia League championship and pennant in their last season at a Washington Senators affiliate, remaining the only team in the league with an affiliation. With a record of 71–57, Emporia ended the regular season in first place, finishing 3.0 games ahead of the second place Petersburg Generals. Playing under manager Morrie Aderholt, the Nationals won both playoff series to claim the championship. In the 1st round of the playoffs, Emporia defeated the Hopewell Blue Sox in five games to advance. In the Finals, the Nationals won the championship in defeating Petersburg 4 games to 2. Emporia's LeRoy Dietzel scored 121 runs to led the league and teammate John Garrison's 170 hits led the league.

Following the 1950 championship, Washington saw an imbalance in affiliate teams within the Virginia League. Ossie Bluege and the Washington Senators ended the affiliation with Emporia. In 1951, Washington transferred their Class D level affiliation to the Roanoke Rapids Jays of the Coastal Plain League.

In their final season, the renamed Emporia "Rebels" missed the playoffs with a last place finish in the Virginia League standings. Playing under managers Joe Mills and Harry Martin, the Rebels ended the Virginia League regular season in sixth place with a record of 39–78, finishing 40.0 games behind the first place Colonial Heights-Petersburg Generals.

The Virginia League permanently folded as a minor league following the 1951 season. Emporia, Virginia has not hosted another minor league team.

== The ballpark ==
The Emporia Nationals and Emporia Rebels hosted home minor league home games at Slagle Stadium.

== Timeline ==
Year(s)	# Yrs.	Team	Level	League	Affiliate	Ballpark
1948–1950	3	Emporia Nationals	Class D	Virginia League	Washington Senators	Slagle Stadium
1951	1	Emporia Rebels	Class D	Virginia League	None	Slagle Stadium

== Year–by–year records ==
Year	Record	Finish	Manager	Attend	Playoffs/Notes
1948	63–74	5th	Morrie Aderholt	33,415	Did not qualify
1949	67–55	3rd	Morrie Aderholt	29,050	Lost in 1st round
1950	71–57	1st	Morrie Aderholt	26,380	Won league pennant Won league championship
1951	39–78	6th	Joe Mills / Harry Martin	12,000	Did not qualify

== Notable alumni ==
- Morrie Aderholt (1948–1950, player/MGR)
- Roy Dietzel (1950)
- Vern Freiburger (1949–1951)
- Bob Oldis (1949–1950)
- Buck Varner (1948)

=== See also ===
- Emporia Nationals players
- Emporia Rebels players
