= Franklin Kildees =

- 1949–1951; (1948–1951); Franklin, Virginia

Minor league affiliations
- Class: Class D (1948–1951)
- League: Virginia League V (1948–1951)

Major league affiliations
- Team: None

Minor league titles
- League titles (0): None
- Conference titles (1): 1949
- Wild card berths (2): 1948; 1950

Team data
- Name: Franklin Cubs (1948); Franklin Kildees (1949–1951)
- Ballpark: Franklin Park (1948–1951)

The Franklin Kildees were a minor league baseball team based in Franklin, Virginia. From 1948 to 1951, Franklin played as members of the Class D level Virginia League, winning the 1949 league pennant. The team played as the "Cubs" in 1948, with Franklin hosting minor league home games at Franklin Park.

== History ==
Minor league baseball begain in Franklin in 1948, when the Franklin "Cubs" franchise was formed, and the team joined the Virginia League. The newly formed Franklin team was owned and founded by Frank Lawrence, who also owned the Portsmouth Cubs, with his Franklin team also adopting the "Cubs" nickname.

In 1948, the Franklin Cubs became members of the Virginia League, which reformed as a six–team, Class D level league. The Blackstone Barristers, Emporia Nationals, Lawrenceville Cardinals, Petersburg Generals and Suffolk Goobers teams joined Franklin in beginning league play on April 23, 1948.

In their first season of play, the Franklin Cubs qualified for the 1948 Virginia League playoffs. The Cubs ended the regular season with a record of 76–64, placing third in the standings, finishing 9.5 games behind the first place Suffolk Goobers. John Zotini served as manager in leading the team to the playoffs. In the first round of the four–team playoffs, the Blackstone Barristers swept Franklin in four games, ending their season. Art Jacobs of Franklin led the league with 147 runs scored.

Following the 1948 season, Frank Lawrence sold the team to the Southampton Athletic Association. The Association consisted of members in Franklin and Southampton County, Virginia. Harold Atkinson served as business manager and George Lacey was hired as team manager. The Franklin team was officially renamed the Southampton "Killdees," interchangeable with the Franklin Kildees.

The word "Killdee" or "kildee" is a dialect variant in the region of Killdeer, which is a bird species.

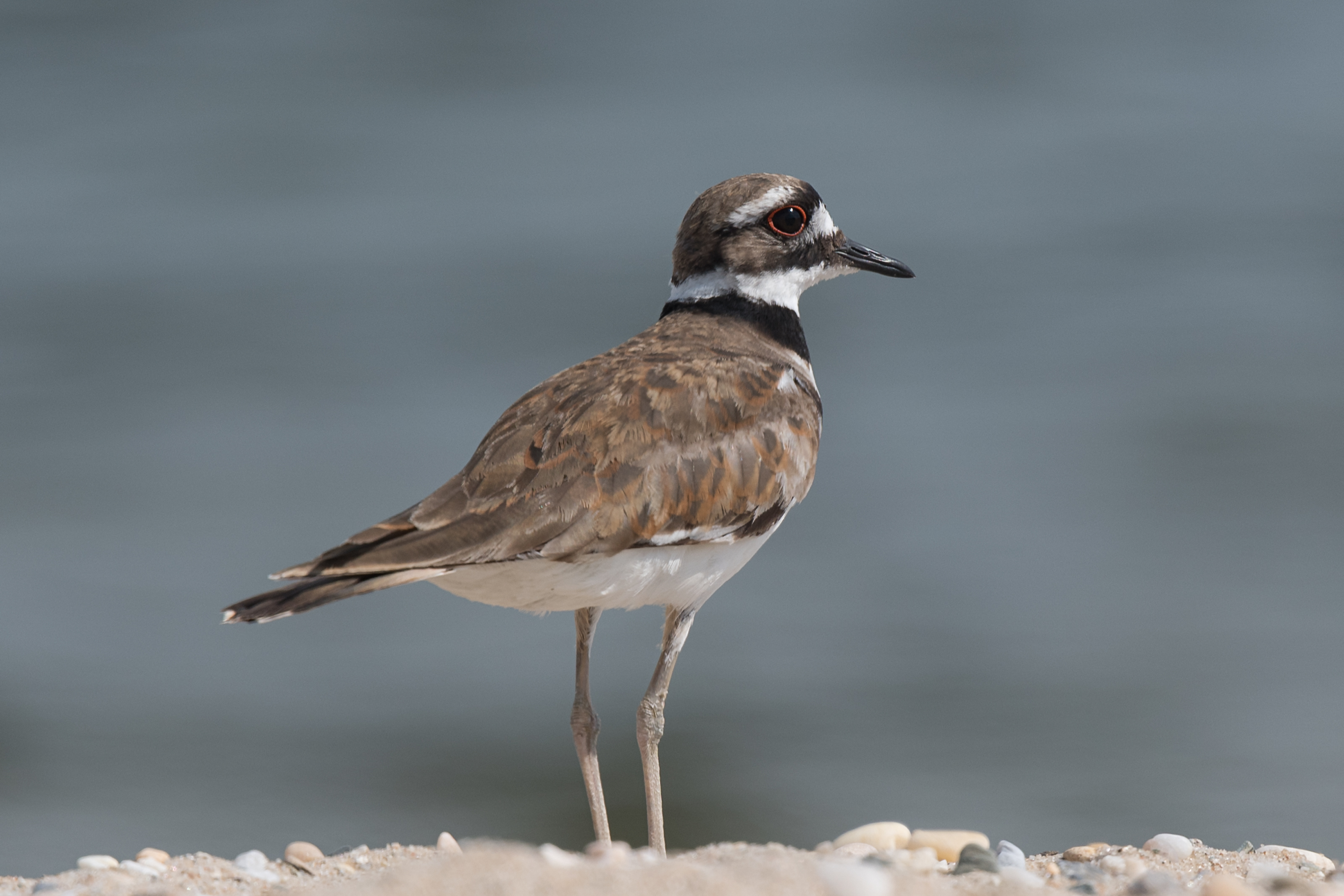
(2017) Killdeer on beach

The team became known as the Franklin "Kildees" in 1949 and won the Virginia League pennant. Playing under manager George Lacy, the Kildees ended the 1949 season with a record of 80–48 and finished the regular season 7.0 games ahead of the second place Petersburg Generals. In the playoffs, Franklin defeated the Suffolk Goobers 4 games to 1 to advance to the finals where Petersburg defeated the Kildees in six games. Pitcher Arnold Atkins of Franklin led the league with 21 wins, 204 strikeouts and a 2.70 ERA, while teammate James Gillette had a league leading 118 RBI.

In 1950, the Franklin finished in a fourth place tie the Virginia League regular season standings, before forfeiting a playoff game to break the tie. With a record of 65–65, Franklin ended the regular season in a fourth-place tie with the Hopewell Blue Sox, who had an identical record. Playing under manager Paul Badgett, the Kildees finished 7.0 games behind the first place Emporia Nationals. A playoff to break the tie was scheduled but wasn't played due to Franklin forfeiting the game. Franklin pitcher Vernon Holland won 20 games to lead the league, while Eugene Hoiberg had a league leading 2.50 ERA.

In their final season, the 1951 Kildees missed the playoffs after a fifth place finish in the Virginia League standings. The Franklin Kildees ended the Virginia League regular season with a record of 49–70, finishing 31.0 games behind the first place Colonial Heights-Petersburg Generals.

During their final season, the Franklin franchise had struggled financially. On June 29, 1951, the team expressed concern about being able to finish the season schedule due to declining attendance and related financial struggles. Ultimately, stakeholders of the team were able to secure funds to complete the season. In January 1952, the Southampton Athletic Association voted against fielding a team in 1952. On January 25, 1952, the Virginia League itself officially folded. Johnny Peterson was the groundskeeper at Franklin Park. Dean Wagenbach and Bobby Guyton were batboys for the Franklin teams.

The Virginia League permanently folded as a minor league following the 1951 season. Franklin, Virginia has not hosted another minor league team.

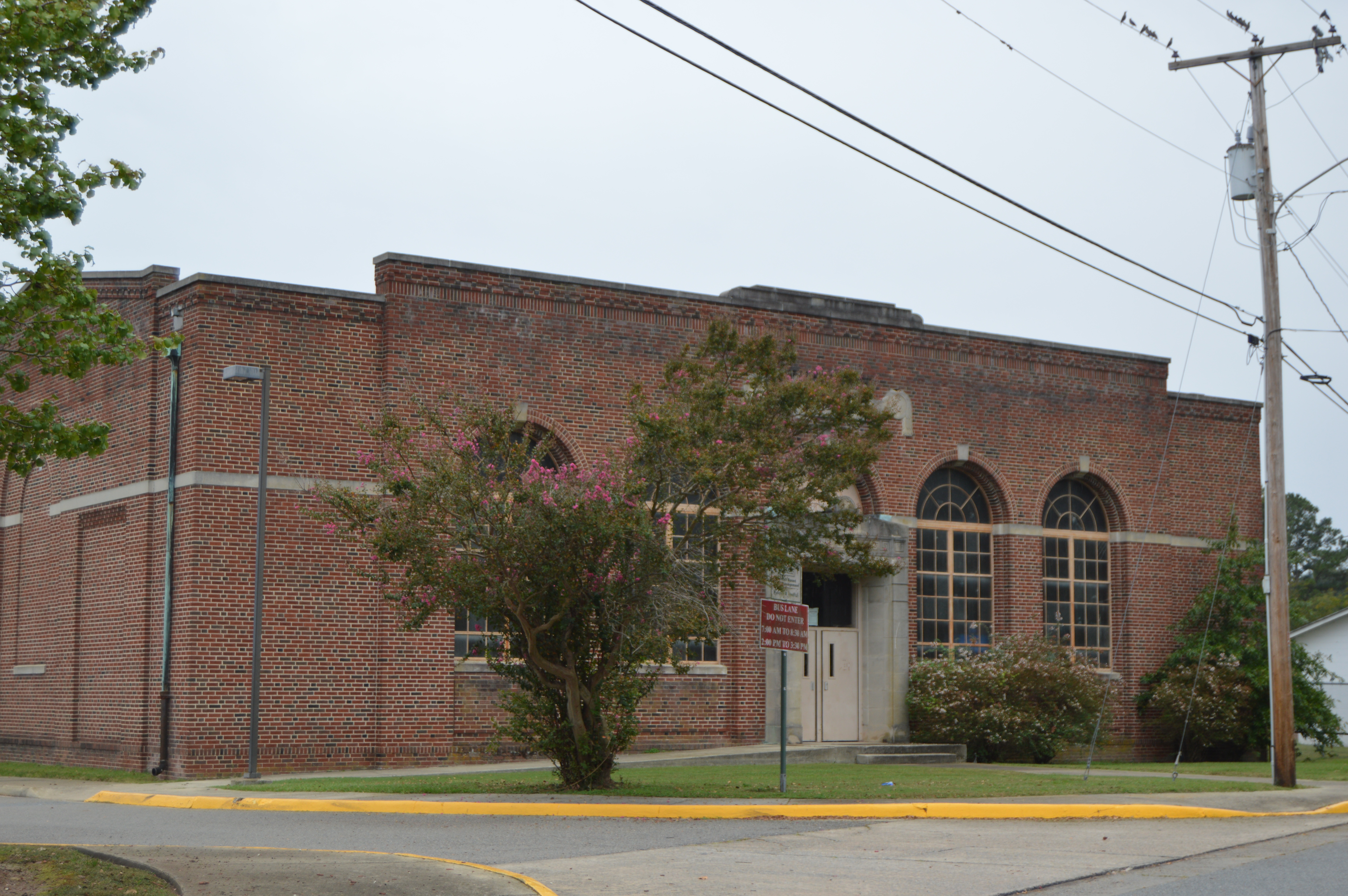
(2020)Franklin High School Gymnasium. National Register of Historic Places

== The ballpark ==
The Franklin Cubs and Franklin Kildees hosted home minor league home games at Franklin Park. The ballpark was located on Hill Street (now Charles Street), just behind the former Franklin High School. Today, J.P. King Jr. Middle School occupies the former high school campus, located at 501 Charles Street.

== Timeline ==
Year(s)	# Yrs.	Team	Level	League	Ballpark
1948	1	Franklin Cubs	Class D	Virginia League	Franklin Park
1949–1951	3	Franklin Kildees	Class D	Virginia League	Franklin Park

== Year–by–year records ==
Year	Record	Finish	Manager	Attend	Playoffs/Notes
1948	76–64	3rd	John Zontini	54,687	Lost in 1st round
1949	80–48	1st	George Lacy	54,282	Won league pennant Lost in Finals
1950	65–65	4th (tie)	Paul Badgett	30,249	Forfeited playoff game
1951	49–70	5th	Vernon Holland / Carl McQuillen	18,299	Did not qualify

== Notable alumni ==
No Franklin Kildees players or Franklin Cubs players advanced to the major leagues.
