= Bill Cunningham (infielder) =

American baseball player (1886-1946)

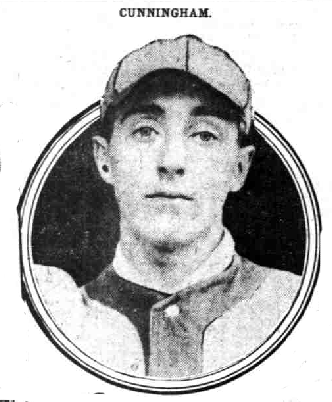
- Second baseman
- Born: June 9, 1886; Schenectady, New York, US
- Died: February 21, 1946 (aged 59); Schenectady, New York, US
- Batted: Right Threw: Right

MLB debut
- September 12, 1910, for the Washington Senators

Last MLB appearance
- May 25, 1912, for the Washington Senators

MLB statistics
- Batting average: .208
- Home runs: 4
- Runs batted in: 59
- Stats at Baseball Reference

Teams
- Washington Senators (1910–12)

William James Cunningham (June 9, 1886 – February 21, 1946) was an American second baseman in Major League Baseball. He played for the Washington Senators from 1910 to 1912.
