= Morrie Aderholt =

American baseball player (1915–1955)

- Outfielder
- Born: September 13, 1915; Mount Olive, North Carolina, U.S.
- Died: March 18, 1955 (aged 39); Sarasota, Florida, U.S.
- Batted: Left Threw: Right

MLB debut
- September 13, 1939, for the Washington Senators

Last MLB appearance
- September 30, 1945, for the Boston Braves

MLB statistics
- Batting average: .267
- Home runs: 3
- Runs scored: 32
- Stats at Baseball Reference

Teams
- Washington Senators (1939–1941); Brooklyn Dodgers (1944–1945); Boston Braves (1945)

Morris Woodrow Aderholt (September 13, 1915 – March 18, 1955) was an American second baseman and outfielder in Major League Baseball from 1939 to 1945.

Born in Mount Olive, North Carolina, Aderholt graduated from Wake Forest University and played professional ball for the Washington Senators, Brooklyn Dodgers and Boston Braves from 1939 to 1945. He played a total of 106 games in the major leagues over the five seasons he was active.

Aderholt made his professional debut for Washington on September 13, 1939, which happened to also fall on his 24th birthday. On that occasion, he ended up hitting a home run and a single against the Chicago White Sox. Through August 29, 2019, Aderholt is the only major league baseball player to have multiple hits—and the only one to hit a homer—in their pro debut, which was also the player's birthday.

Aderholt was described by Dodgers President Branch Rickey as the "World's worst third baseman... but he's a natural batsman." He was thus moved to the outfield, where he would be less of a defensive liability. His fielding percentage in 1944 was a mediocre .871.

After his playing career ended, he went on to manage several minor league teams and also served as a scout for the Senators. Aderholt died on March 18, 1955, after suffering a heart attack during a scouting trip to Sarasota, Florida.
