= Petersburg, Virginia minor league baseball history =

Petersburg, Virginia minor league baseball teams
- 1885–1954; (1885–1886, 1894–1896, 1900, 1910–1921, 1923–1924, 1926–1928, 1941–1942, 1948–1951, 1954); Petersburg, Virginia

Minor league affiliations
- Class: Independent (1885–1886, 1894–1896); Class D (1900); Class C (1910–1919); Class B (1920–1921, 1923–1924, 1926–1928); Class C (1941–1942); Class D (1948–1951, 1954)
- League: Virginia League I (1885–1886, 1894–1896); Virginia League II (1900); Virginia League III (1910–1921, 1923–1924, 1926–1928); Virginia League IV (1941–1942); Virginia League V (1948–1951); Piedmont League (1954)

Major league affiliations
- Team: St. Louis Cardinals (1923); Cincinnati Reds (1954)

Minor league titles
- League titles (5): 1894; 1911; 1913; 1919; 1949
- Conference titles (2): 1941; 1951

Team data
- Name: Petersburg (1885–1886); Petersburg Farmers (1894–1896, 1900); Petersburg Goobers (1910–1921, 1924); Petersburg Trunkmakers (1923); Petersburg Broncos (1926–1928); Petersburg Rebels (1941–1942); Petersburg Generals (1948–1950); Colonial Heights-Petersburg Generals (1951); Colonial Heights-Petersburg Colts (1954)
- Ballpark: Petersburg Ballfield (1885–1886, 1894–1896, 1900); Parkinson Park (1910–1913); McKenzie Street Park (1914, 1923–1925, 1948–1950); Shepherd Park (1951, 1954)

Minor league baseball teams were based in Petersburg, Virginia and neighboring Colonial Heights, Virginia in various seasons between 1885 and 1954. Playing under numerous monikers, Petersburg teams played as members of the Virginia League beginning in 1885 and ending in 1951 and the 1954 Piedmont League. Petersburg teams won five league championships. Petersburg teams were a minor league affiliate of the St. Louis Cardinals in 1923 and Cincinnati Reds in 1954.

Baseball Hall of Fame member Sam Rice played for the 1914 and 1915 Petersburg Goobers.

== History ==
=== 1885 to 1886, 1894 to 1896: Virginia League I ===
Minor league baseball began in Petersburg in 1885, when Petersburg joined the Virginia League. Petersburg played in the Virginia League in 1885 and 1886.

The Petersburg "Farmers" rejoined the six–team 1894 Virginia League, winning the 1894 Championship. On June 15, 1894, Brownie Foreman threw a no–hitter as Petersburg defeated the Staunton Mountaineers 9–1. The Petersburg Farmers finished 72–44 in the regular season to capture the title, as there were no league playoffs.

After finishing 55–69, to place fifth in the 1895 Virginia League, the Petersburg Farmers started 1896 with a 32–60 record. On August 13, 1896, the Petersburg Farmers moved to Hampton, Virginia to become the Hampton-Newport News Clamdiggers for the remainder of the season. The Virginia League folded after the 1896 season.

=== 1900: Virginia League II ===
The Virginia League reformed in 1900, before folding after the season. The Petersburg Farmers had compiled a record of 8–26 when the team disbanded on June 11, 1900.

=== 1910 to 1921, 1923 & 1924, 1926to 1928: Virginia League II ===
The Petersburg Goobers began to play in the Virginia League in 1910, when the Portsmouth Truckers moved to Petersburg on July 5, 1910. The team placed sixth with a 43–68 record.

The Petersburg Goobers won the 1911 Virginia League Championship. Petersburg, also going by the "Hustlers" moniker in 1911, finished first, with a record of 68–51 to capture the Virginia League championship.

The Goobers placed second in the 1912 Virginia League with a 79–54 record. The 1913 Petersburg Goobers captured the Virginia League Championship with their first-place finish and 89–46 record. Petersburg's Harry Hedgpeth pitched a no–hitter against the Roanoke Tigers on August 1, 1913. Petersburg won the game 4–0.

The 1914 Petersburg Goobers placed fifth with a record of 60–74. In 1915 they were sixth at 40–84 in the Virginia League.

Baseball Hall of Fame member Sam Rice played for the Petersburg Goobers in 1914–1915. His performance in 1914, while on furlough from the U.S. Navy, led Petersburg owner Dr. D.H Leigh to reach out to Virginia Senators Thomas S. Martin and Claude A. Swanson and inquire about getting Rice discharged from the Navy. In 1912, Rice was in the preseason, playing for the Galesburg Pavers when his wife, two children, his parents and two sisters were killed in a tornado. Rice eventually quit baseball and enrolled in the Navy. In 1914, with the senators help, Rice was honorably discharged from the Navy. He pitched and played the outfield for Petersburg for the remainder of the 1914 season, when he had a 9–2 record and hit .310. Rice rejoined the Petersburg Goobers for the 1915 season. On July 28, 1915, Washington Senators owner Clark Griffith purchased Rice from Leigh and Petersburg. Rice was in the major leagues the next day at age 24.

The 1916 Petersburg Goobers finished 54–68, placing fourth in the Virginia League.

In 1917, the Goobers were 6–8 when the Virginia League disbanded on May 15, 1917.

The Virginia League disbanded again in mid-season in 1918. The Petersburg Goobers had a 27–22 record when the league disbanded in June, 1918.

The Petersburg Goobers captured the 1919 Virginia League Championship. The Goobers finished first in the regular season with a 62–47 record. The Virginia League had planned to hold playoffs, but disagreements led to the playoffs being cancelled.

After finishing third in 1920, with a 68–50 record, Petersburg relocated in mid–season of 1921. The Petersburg Goobers moved to Tarboro, North Carolina on August 2, 1921, after the franchise was forfeited, playing as the Tarboro Tarbabies. The 1921 Petersburg/Tarboro squad finished last with a 46–88 record.

Petersburg returned to the Virginia League in 1923 as the Petersburg Trunkmakers, an affiliate of the St. Louis Cardinals. The Trunkmakers finished last, placing sixth in the six–team league with a 43–81 record.

The Petersburg Goobers moniker reappeared in 1924. The Goobers finished with a 46–89 record, placing last in the Virginia League. Petersburg folded after the season.

The Petersburg Broncos rejoined the Virginia League in 1926. The Broncos finished sixth with a 66–87 record in 1926 and second, with a 72–61 record in 1927. On June 3, 1928, the Broncos were in third place with a 15–27 record, when the Virginia League disbanded.

=== 1941 and 1942: Virginia League IV ===
The 1941 Petersburg Rebels returned to play in the 1941 Virginia League IV and won the league pennant. The 1941 Rebels finished 66–53, first in the Virginia League regular season standings. In the Playoffs, the Lynchburg Senators swept the Petersburg Rebels 3 games to 0.

The Petersburg Rebels placed third with a 74–52 record in the 1942 Virginia League. The Virginia League suspended play after the 1942 season due to World War II.

=== 1948 to 1951: Virginia League V ===
After World War II, the Petersburg Generals joined the reformed Virginia League V in 1948. The Generals advanced to the 1948 league finals. The Generals finished with a record of 73–62, placing fourth in the regular season. In the playoffs, Petersburg defeated the Suffolk Goobers 4 games to 2 and advanced. In the Finals, the Blackstone Barristers defeated the Petersburg Generals 4 games to 3. The 1948 attendance was 116,062.

The 1949 Petersburg Generals won the Virginia League Championship. Petersburg finished 72–54, placing second in the Virginal League regular season standings. In the Playoffs, the Petersburg Generals defeated the Emporia Nationals 4 games to 3. In the Finals, the Petersburg Generals defeated the Franklin Kildees 4 games to 2 to win the championship. The 1949 season attendance was 76,000.

In 1950, the Petersburg Generals returned to the Virginia League finals for the third consecutive season. The Generals finished 69–61, placing second in the Virginia League regular season. In the playoffs, the Generals defeated the Elizabeth City Albemarles 4 games to 2. In the Finals, the Emporia Nationals defeated the Petersburg Generals 4 games to 2. The Petersburg season attendance was 43,508.

In 1951, Petersburg merged with neighboring Colonial Heights, Virginia. The team moved to play home games at Shepherd Park in Colonial Heights. The Colonial Heights-Petersburg Generals advanced to the 1951 Virginia League finals. The Generals finished 80–39, placing first in the regular season standings. In the playoffs, the Colonial Heights-Petersburg Generals defeated the Suffolk Goobers 4 games to 1. In the Finals, the Elizabeth City Albemarles defeated Colonial Heights-Petersburg 4 games to 1. The 1951 season attendance was 35,146. The Virginia League permanently folded after the 1951 season.

=== 1954: Piedmont League ===
In 1954, the Colonial Heights-Petersburg Colts resumed minor league, when the team became members of the Piedmont League, playing as a minor league affiliate of the Cincinnati Reds. The Colts finished with a record of 62–78, tied for last in the Piedmont League. The Colonial Heights-Petersburg franchise folded after the 1954 season.

Fifty-nine years later, in 2013, the Colonial Heights-Petersburg Colts were succeeded in Petersburg by the summer collegiate baseball team, the Petersburg Generals. Reviving the previous moniker, the current "Generals" became members of the Coastal Plain League.

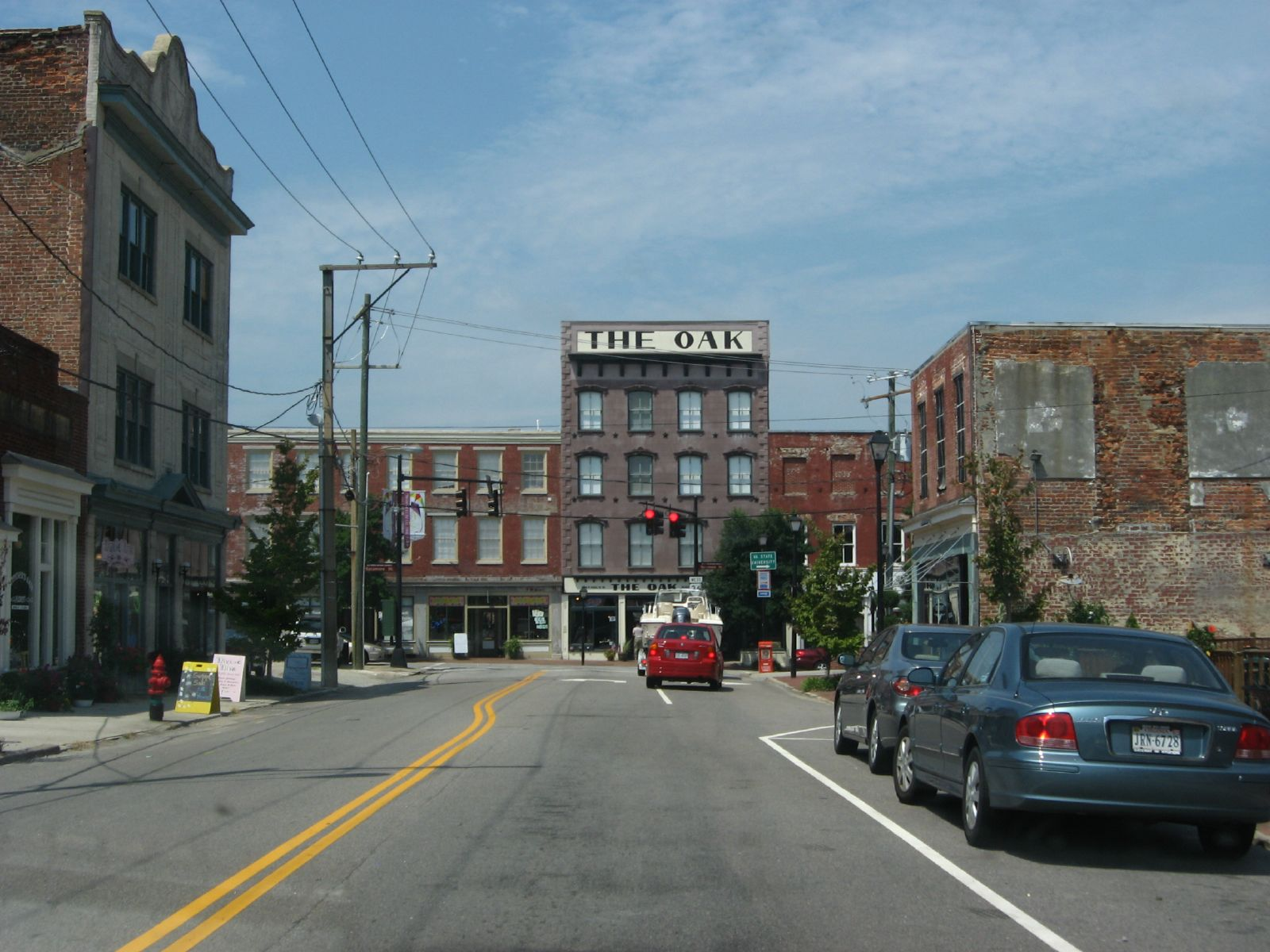
(2008) Downtown. Petersburg, Virginia

== The ballparks ==
Until 1900, Petersburg teams were referenced to have played minor league home games at the Petersburg Ballfield. The ballpark was located at the corner of West Washington (US 460 & US 1) & West Street, Petersburg, Virginia.

Petersburg minor league teams from 1910 to 1913 were noted to have played home games at Parkinson Park. The ballpark was located on Canal Street, Petersburg, Virginia, near the Appomattox River.

From 1914 to 1950, Petersburg minor league teams were noted to have played at McKenzie Street Park. McKenzie Street Park was located on McKenzie Street between North West Street & North Dunlop Street, Petersburg, Virginia.

In 1951 and 1954, Colonial Heights-Petersburg minor league home games were referenced to have been played at Shepherd Park. Today, the Shepherd Stadium Baseball Complex is still in use. The address is 901 Meridian Avenue, Colonial Heights, Virginia 23834.

== Notable alumni ==
- Sam Rice (1914–1915) Inducted Baseball Hall of Fame, 1963
- Ken Ash (1926–1927)
- Everett Booe (1910–1912)
- Dick Burrus (1917)
- Tommy Clarke (1920, MGR)
- Guy Cooper (1913)
- Art Corcoran (1921) NFL & MLB player
- Harry Damrau (1913–1914)
- Harley Dillinger (1917)
- Davey Dunkle (1895)
- Gus Dundon (1896)
- John Farrell (1894)
- Brownie Foreman (1894–1895)
- Bill Gardner (1886)
- Jimmy Grant (1948)
- June Greene (1923)
- Bill Hallman (1896)
- Harry Hedgpeth (1912–1914)
- Snake Henry (1916)
- Izzy Hoffman (1900)
- Jack Horner (1894)
- Bill Jackson (1910)
- Vic Keen (1918)
- Mickey Keliher (1910–1911, 1915)
- Enos Kirkpatrick (1910)
- Frank Kitson (1896)
- Ed Konetchy (1924, MGR)
- Tommy Leach (1896)
- Doc McJames (1894–1895)
- Bill Martin (1921, MGR)
- Amby McConnell (1919–1921) (1919, 1921, MGR)
- Herm McFarland (1910)
- Doc McJames (1895)
- Rufus Meadows (1924)
- George Mohart (1916)
- Greg Mulleavy (1927)
- Bert Myers (1894)
- Vance Page (1928)
- Dixie Parker (1918–1919)
- Ed Porray (1915)
- Doc Powers (1896)
- Ambrose Puttmann (1910)
- Crazy Schmit (1896)
- Al Schweitzer (1923)
- Otis Stocksdale (1896)
- Mike Trost 1894)
- Bob Unglaub (1895)
- Bob Vail (1910)
- Johnny Vander Meer (1954, MGR) Cincinnati Reds Hall of Fame
- Polly Wolfe (1921)
- Bill Wynne (1894)
- Harley Young (1920)
- Elmer Yoter (1923)

== See also ==
- Petersburg Goobers players
- Petersburg Trunkmakers players
- Petersburg Rebels players
- Petersburg Farmers players
- Petersburg Broncos players
