= John A. Holmes High School =

High school in North Carolina, United States

Coordinates: 36°04′00″N 76°36′18″W

Location
- 800 North Oakum Street; Edenton, (Chowan County), North Carolina 27932; United States

Information
- Type: Public high school
- Principal: Sonya Rinehart
- Staff: 33.47 (FTE)
- Enrollment: 589 (2023-2024)
- Student to teacher ratio: 17.60
- Colors: Blue, white and gold
- Nickname: Aces

John A. Holmes High School is a public high school located in Edenton, North Carolina, United States. The school has a Junior Reserve Officers' Training Corps program.
