= Petersburg Generals =

- Logo

Information
- League: Coastal Plain League (North (2000-2011) East (2012-2016))
- Location: Petersburg, Virginia
- Ballpark: Petersburg Sports Complex
- Founded: 2000
- Folded: 2017
- League championships: 1 (2000)
- Division championships: 2 (2000, 2003)
- Colors: red, silver, black

The Petersburg Generals were an amateur baseball team in the Coastal Plain League, a collegiate summer baseball league. The team played its home games at the Petersburg Sports Complex in Petersburg, Virginia. The Generals first started participating in the Coastal Plain League in 2000. The Generals made it to the postseason twice: winning two division championships, in 2000 and 2003, and as a wild card team in 2002. They won their lone league championship in 2000.

In 2017, while having financial trouble, the acting city manager of Petersburg approved the sale of the team for $100,000. The team is not scheduled to participate in the 2017 Coastal Plain League season.

== Alumni ==
- Brett Campbell (2001); pitcher, Washington Nationals (2006)
- Don Kelly (2000); shortstop, Pittsburgh Pirates (2007), Detroit Tigers (2009-2014), Miami Marlins (2015–2016)
- Jeremy Wolf (2014), American-Israeli outfielder/first baseman on the Israel National Baseball Team
