= Jackson Generals (KITTY League) =

- 1935–1954; (1935–1942, 1950–1954); Jackson, Tennessee

Minor league affiliations
- Class: Class D (1935–1942, 1950–1954)
- League: Kentucky–Illinois–Tennessee League (1935–1942, 1950–1954)

Major league affiliations
- Team: Unaffiliated (1954); Cincinnati Reds (1953); Unaffiliated (1935–1942, 1950–1952)

Minor league titles
- League titles (2): 1938; 1940
- Pennants (1): 1941
- First-half titles (1): 1940

Team data
- Name: Jackson Generals (1935–1942, 1950–1954)
- Ballpark: Municipal Park (1950–1954); Lakeview Ball Park (1935–1942)

The Jackson Generals were a Minor League Baseball team that played in the Class D Kentucky–Illinois–Tennessee League (KITTY League) from 1935 to 1942 and again from 1950 to 1954. The Generals were located in Jackson, Tennessee, and played their home games at Lakeview Ball Park in their first run and at Municipal Park in their second stretch. They were an affiliate of the Cincinnati Reds in 1953.

Over the course of their 12-year run, the Generals played in 1,388 regular season games and compiled a win–loss record of 729–659. Jackson reached the postseason on six occasions, winning one pennant, two half division titles, and two KITTY League championships (1938 and 1940). The team had an overall postseason record of 14–14.

== History ==
=== Prior professional baseball in Jackson ===
Professional baseball was first played in Jackson, Tennessee, in 1903 by the Jackson Railroaders of the Kentucky–Illinois–Tennessee League. They were followed in the KITTY League by the Jackson Climbers in 1911 and the Jackson Blue Jays in 1924. The Blue Jays moved to the Tri-State League in 1925 as the Jackson Giants and became the Jackson Jays in 1926.

=== First run (1935–1942) ===
In 1935, the city fielded a new team known as the Jackson Generals in the KITTY League. The Generals lost their inaugural season opener at home, 10–7, to the Lexington Giants on May 22 at Lakeview Ball Park. After two more home losses to Lexington, the Generals won their first game on May 27, beating the Hopkinsville Hoppers on the road, 6–5. Jackson won the second half of the league's split season, but the league refused to award them the second half title because they exceeded the limit of veteran players on their roster. Overall, they posted the highest record in the league with a 50–42 (.543) mark. Despite a winning 62–55 (.530) record in 1936, the Generals failed to win either half of the season.

The KITTY League expanded its playoffs in 1937 to include the top four teams over the full season. Jackson finished in a tie for fourth place with the Mayfield Clothiers, each with records of 63–57 (.525). Jackson lost a one-game playoff with Mayfield for the fourth-place spot, 12–4. A second-place finish in 1938 at 74–54 (.578) put the Generals back in the postseason. They defeated Lexington, three games to none, in the semifinals. With a 2–1 lead on Hopkinsville, the finals were abandoned on September 22 when the Hoppers refused to travel to Jackson for the remainder of the series, citing cold weather and a lack of interest. The Generals were declared the playoff champions. On July 1, 1939, William Pavlige pitched a no-hitter against Hopkinsville in a 5–0 road win. Jackson placed fourth in 1939 at 67–59 (.532), but they were eliminated in the playoff semifinals by the Mayfield Browns, 3–2.

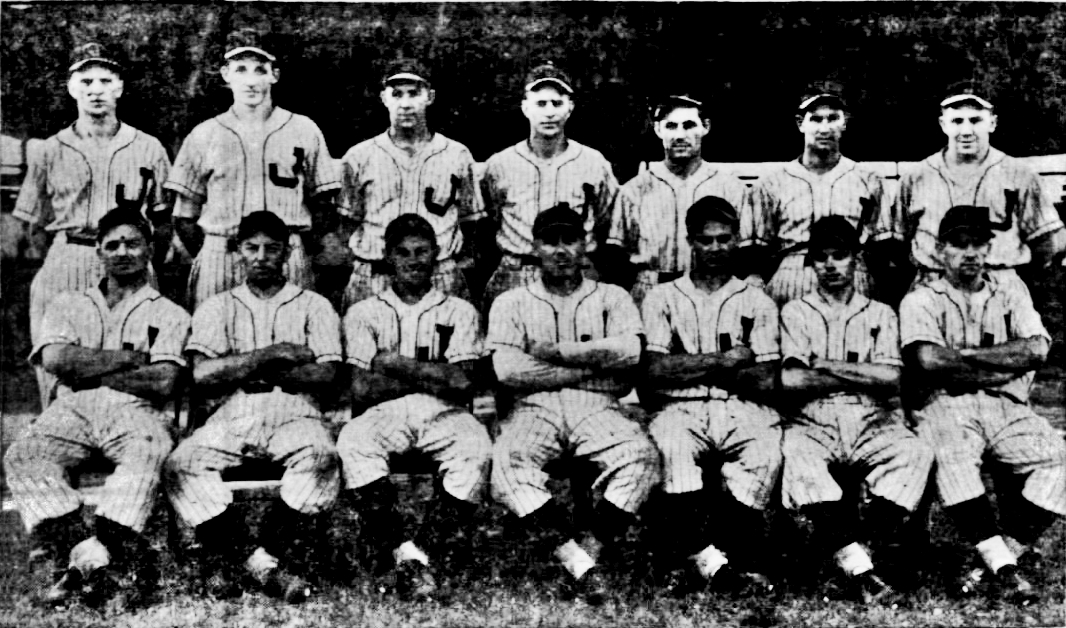
The 1941 Jackson Generals

Former nine-year major league catcher Mickey O'Neil led the club as its manager from 1940 to 1942. In his first season, the Generals won the first half and compiled a full-season record of 66–58 (.532). They then defeated the Bowling Green Barons, 4–3, to win their second KITTY League championship. The qualified for the playoffs again in 1941 with a pennant-winning 84–43 (.661) record. Jackson was eliminated in the semifinals by Mayfield, 3–1. On June 19, 1942, the league disbanded following the withdrawal of two teams which faced financial difficulties and a vote by the remaining clubs to discontinue the circuit. Jackson lost its final game on the road to Bowling Green, 8–2. The Generals held a third-place 29–19 (.604) record in the abandoned season.

The KITTY League was nonoperational from 1943 to 1945 during World War II, and Jackson did not field another team through 1949. Over eight seasons of competition the Generals accumulated a regular season record of 495–387 (.561).

=== Second run (1950–1954) ===
The Jackson Generals returned to the KITTY League in 1950 after a seven-year absence. Instead of Lakeview Ball Park, the team played at Municipal Park at the fairgrounds. Managed by former major league third baseman Glen Stewart, the Generals won their 1950 opener with a home win over Hopkinsville, 4–3, on May 3. Jackson placed third at 68–52 (.567) but were eliminated in the playoff semifinals, 3–2, by the Fulton Railroaders. Stewart's 1951 team just missed the playoffs with a fifth place 59–61 (.492) mark. The 1952 squad, managed at different times by a pair of player-managers and eventually former skipper Mickey O'Neil, placed seventh of eight teams with a record of 48–71 (.403).

In 1953, the Generals became an affiliate of the Cincinnati Reds. Under O'Neil, Jackson placed sixth at 58–62 (.483). Cincinnati did not continue its affiliation with Jackson in the 1954 season. They opened the campaign with a 20–0 loss to the Union City Dodgers on the road. This was the first of 26 consecutive losses. Their first win came on May 31 in the second game of a doubleheader when they defeated the Madisonville Miners, 10–2. The team's poor play resulting in low attendance and financial loses, the team's owner surrendered the franchise to the league on June 1. Their final record was 1–26 (.037). The franchise was eventually placed in Central City, Kentucky, as the Central City Reds on July 5. In their second stretch of four years, Jackson accumulated a record of 234–272 (.462). Over all 12 years of competition, the Generals had an all-time record of 729–659 (.525).

Jackson was not represented in professional baseball again until 1998 when the West Tenn Diamond Jaxx joined the Double-A Southern League. In 2011, the franchise renamed itself the Jackson Generals.

== Season-by-season results ==
Season	Regular season				Postseason			Ref.
Season	Record	Win %	Finish	GB	Record	Win %	Result	Ref.
1935	50–42	.543	1st	—	—	—	Result	Won second half title, but were disqualified
1936	62–55	.530	5th	10 1/2	—	—	—	
1937	63–57	.525	5th (tie)	10 1/2	0–1	.000	Lost playoff qualifier vs. Mayfield Clothiers	
1938	74–54	.578	2nd	1 1/2	5–1	.833	Won semifinals vs. Lexington Giants, 3–0; Won KITTY League championship vs. Hopkinsville Hoppers, 2–1	
1939	67–59	.532	4th	9 1/2	2–3	.400	Lost semifinals vs. Mayfield Browns, 3–2	
1940	66–58	.532	4th	8 1/2	4–3	.571	Won first half title Won KITTY League championship vs. Bowling Green Barons, 4–3	
1941	84–43	.661	1st	—	1–3	.250	Won pennant Lost semifinals vs. Mayfield Browns, 3–1	
1942	29–19	.604	3rd	3	—	—	—	
1950	68–52	.567	3rd	6	2–3	.400	Lost semifinals vs. Fulton Railroaders, 3–2	
1951	59–61	.492	5th	14 1/2	—	—	—	
1952	48–71	.403	7th	34	—	—	—	
1953	58–62	.483	6th	12	—	—	—	
1954	1–26	.037	DNF	DNF	—	—	—	
Totals	729–659	.525	—	—	14–14	.500	—	—

== Notable players ==
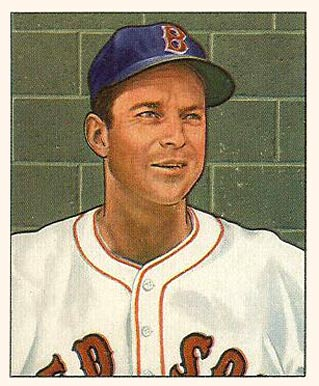
Ellis Kinder (1938–1941) played four seasons with Jackson before a 12-year major league career.

Ten Generals also played at least one game in Major League Baseball during their careers. These players and their seasons with Jackson were:

- Orlin Collier (1937)
- Tommy Giordano (1954)
- Ellis Kinder (1938–1941)
- Joe Klinger (1937)
- Mickey O'Neil (1940–1942)
- Bill Nagel (1935)
- Mule Shirley (1937)
- Glen Stewart (1950–1951)
- Herb Welch (1936–1938)
- Ed Wright (1938, 1942)
