= Cairo Dodgers =

- 1949–1950; Cairo, Illinois

Minor league affiliations
- Class: Class D (1949–1950)
- League: Kitty League (1949–1950)

Major league affiliations
- Team: Brooklyn Dodgers (1949–1950)

Minor league titles
- League titles (0): None
- Wild card berths (1): 1949

Team data
- Name: Cairo Dodgers (1949–1950)
- Ballpark: Dodger Field (1949–1950)

The Cairo Dodgers were a minor league baseball team based in Cairo, Illinois. As a minor league affiliate of the Brooklyn Dodgers in 1949 and 1950, the Cairo Dodgers played as members of the Kentucky–Illinois–Tennessee League (KITTY League), qualifying for the playoffs in their first season. Cairo hosted minor league home games at Dodger Field.

== History ==
In 1897, minor league baseball began in the city, when the Cairo Egyptians played the season as charter members of the Class C level Central League. Another Egyptians team played in the 1903 Kentucky–Illinois–Tennessee League (KITTY League), followed in league play by the 1904 Cairo Champions and Cario Giants (1905–1906). The Egyptians resumed play from 1911 to 1914 in the second KITTY League and returned from 1922 to 1924, playing in a third incarnation of the league.

In 1946, the Cairo Egyptians began play in the reformed Kentucky–Illinois–Tennessee League. The Egyptians continued league play through 1948.

In 1949, Cairo became a minor league affiliate of the Brooklyn Dodgers, with the franchise continuing play as members of the eight-team, Class D level Kentucky–Illinois–Tennessee League. The Clarksville Cats, Fulton Railroaders, Hopkinsville Hoppers, Madisonville Miners, Mayfield Clothiers, Owensboro Oilers and Union City Greyhounds teams joined the Cario "Dodgers" in beginning league play on May 4, 1949.

The Dodgers advanced to the Kentucky–Illinois–Tennessee League Finals in 1949. Cairo ended the regular season with a record of 74–51, playing the season under manager Bill Hart. The Dodgers ended the regular season 9.5 games behind the first place Owensville Oilers. In the playoffs, the Cairo Dodgers defeated the Hopkinsville Hoppers three games to two and advanced. In the playoff Finals, the Madisonville Miners were leading Cairo two games to one when the series was ended due to bad weather. Player/manager Bill Hart won the league batting title, hitting .404.

In 1950, Cairo played their final minor league season, as the Dodgers finished the season in last place in the Kentucky–Illinois–Tennessee League. The Dodgers finished the season with a record of 26–85, placing eighth. Managed by Hal Seawright and Paul Box, Cairo ended the regular season 43.5 games behind first place Mayfield Minors, as the Fulton Railroaders were the eventual league champion.

After drawing 8,485 total fans in 1950, Cairo did not return to the 1951 Kentucky–Illinois–Tennessee League, replaced in league play by the Paducah Chiefs. Cairo has not hosted another minor league team.

== The ballpark ==
The Cario Dodgers hosted minor league home games at the ballpark known as "Dodger Field." It was previously known as "Egyptian Field" in hosting the Cairo Egyptians beginning in 1946. The ballpark was located at 2007 Commerce Avenue in Cairo. Today, the site is a vacant field.

In 1943 and 1944, the St. Louis Cardinals held their Spring training at Cotter Field in Cairo. The ballpark became flooded in the spring of 1945, causing the Cardinals to hold spring training in St. Louis.

== Timeline ==
Year(s)	# Yrs.	Team	Level	League	Affiliate	Ballpark
1949–1950	2	Cairo Dodgers	Class D	Kentucky–Illinois–Tennessee League	Brooklyn Dodgers	Dodger Field

== Year–by–year records ==
Year	Record	Finish	Attend	Manager	Playoffs/Notes
1949	74–51	2nd	31,563	Bill Hart	Lost in Finals
1950	26–85	8th	8,485	Hal Seawright / Paul Box	Did not qualify

== Notable alumni ==
- Bill Hart (1949, MGR)
- Lee Moody (1950)
- Cairo Dodgers players
