= Portageville Pirates =

Portage Pirates
- 1935–1936; Portageville, Missouri

Minor league affiliations
- Class: Class D (1935–1936)
- League: Kitty League (1935–1936)

Major league affiliations
- Team: Pittsburgh Pirates (1935–1936)

Minor league titles
- League titles (0): None

Team data
- Name: Portageville Pirates (1935–1936)
- Ballpark: Harris Park (1935–1936)

The Portageville Pirates were a minor league baseball team based Portageville, Missouri. In 1935 and 1936, the "Pirates" played as members of the Class D level Kentucky–Illinois–Tennessee League, also known as the "KITTY League." The Portageville team was a minor league affiliate of the Pittsburgh Pirates, adopting their nickname. During the 1936 season, Portageville relocated to Owensboro, Kentucky and became the Owensboro Pirates.

Portageville hosted minor league home games at Harris Park in Portageville.

== History ==
Minor league baseball began in Portageville, Missouri when the 1935 Portageville "Pirates" began play as members of the six–team Class D level Kentucky–Illinois–Tennessee League, which was reforming. The 1935 Portageville team was a minor league affiliate of the Pittsburgh Pirates. The Hopkinsville Hoppers, Jackson Generals, Lexington Giants, Paducah Red Birds and Union City Greyhounds teams joined Portage in beginning league play on May 22, 1935. After beginning play in 1903, the Kentucky–Illinois–Tennessee League was reforming after folding following the 1924 season. Portageville, Lexington and Union were new franchises to the league.

On May 22, 1935, Portageville won their Opening Day game at home. The Pirates defeated the Union City Greyhounds by the score of 3–2 in their first game. The Pirates had their first loss two games later on May 24, 1935, as Union City defeated Portageville 4–2.

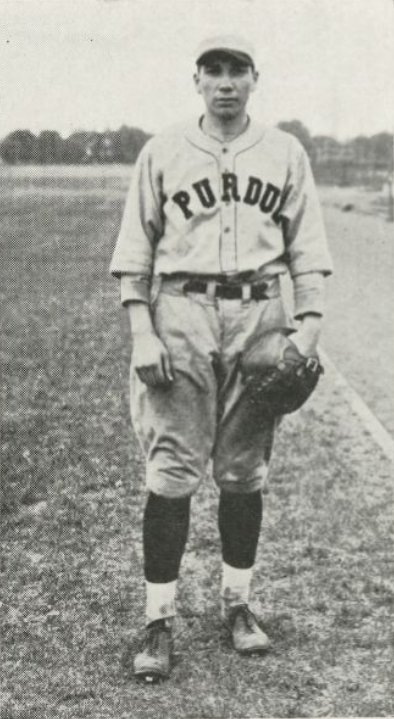
(1926) Hughie Wise. Purdue yearbook. Wise managed the 1936 Portageville Pirates.

In their first season, the "Pirates" ended the Kentucky–Illinois–Tennessee League season with a final record of 44-46. Portageville placed fourth in the six-team league, as Pat Patterson and Herb Welch served as managers. Portageville ended the season 6.0 games behind the first place Jackson Generals in the final overall standings. The team had an extensive roster turnover in 1935, with 60 players playing for the team. Portageville did not qualify for the playoff. Lexington won the first half of the split season schedule in the league and Jackson won the second half. The playoff was cancelled after it was ruled that Jackson and other teams had used ineligible players during the season.

The Pittsburgh Pirates' other minor league affiliate teams were the Winnipeg Maroons, Jeannette Little Pirates, Hutchinson Larks and Scranton Miners.

In 1936, Portageville continued Kentucky–Illinois–Tennessee League play to begin the season. The KITTY league expanded to become an eight-team league, adding the Fulton Eagles and Mayfield Clothiers teams to the league. On July 17, 1936, the Portageville Pirates franchise moved to Owensboro, Kentucky. At the time of the move, Portageville had a 26–35 record. The team played as the Owensboro Pirates for the remainder of the 1936 league season.

The 1936 team continued play and compiled a 26–32 record while playing the remainder of the season based in Owensboro. Combined, the Portage/Owensboro team finished in sixth place in the standings, playing the season under manager Hughie Wise in both locations. The team ended the Kentucky–Illinois–Tennessee League with an overall record of 52-67 in the Kitty League standings and finished 21.5 games behind the first place Paducah Indians.

In 1937, the Owensboro Oilers team continued play as members of the KITTY League, but the Portageville franchise did not return to the league. Portageville, Missouri has not hosted another minor league team.

== The ballpark ==
The Portage Pirates teams hosted minor league home games at Harris Park. The ballpark location is unknown and the Harris Park ballpark had a capacity of 1,500.

== Year–by–year records ==
| Year | Record | Finish | Manager | Playoffs/Notes |
|---|---|---|---|---|
| 1935 | 44-46 | 4th | Pat Patterson / Herb Welch | No playoffs held |
| 1936 | 52-67 | 6th | Hughie Wise | Team (26–35) moved to Owensboro July 17 |

== Notable alumni ==
- Chet Clemens (1936)
- Hughie Wise (1936, MGR)
- Herb Welch (1935, MGR)

== See also ==
- Portageville Pirates players
