= Kitty League =

American baseball league

- Most recent season or competition: 1955 Kitty League season
- Classification: Class D
- Sport: Baseball
- First season: 1903
- Folded: 1955
- President: Dr. William I. Thompson (1903–1904); Charles W. Brown (1905); Clifton C. Gosnell (1906, 1910–1911); Dr. Frank H. Bassett (1912–1914, 1916, 1922–1924, 1935–1937); J.E. Hannephin (1938); Ben F. Howard (1939); Shelby Peace (1946–1955)
- No. of teams: 22
- Country: United States of America
- Most titles: 5 Paducah (1904, 1905, 1913, 1953, 1955); Mayfield (1922, 1923, 1937, 1941, 1950)

The Kitty League, formally known as the Kentucky–Illinois–Tennessee League, was a Class D level minor league baseball circuit that went through six different periods of play between 1903 and 1955. The League hosted teams in 29 cities from the states of Illinois, Indiana, Kentucky, Missouri and Tennessee.

== History ==
The first Kitty League played from 1903 through 1906. The next one ran from 1910 through 1914. The third try played the 1916 season. The circuit was revived in 1922 and lasted three years. The fifth Kitty League lasted the longest, playing from 1935 through 1955 with a break from 1943 to 1945 due to World War II. The league was also known briefly as the Kentucky–Indiana–Tennessee League, for during this time the league contained teams such as the Evansville Yankees from Evansville, Indiana. Unlike most leagues that were dormant for years in between playing, the Kitty was much the same from 1903 to 1955, through its inactive years. Clifton C. Gosnell was league president in 1906, after which the league stopped playing, and was president in 1910–1911 when play resumed. Then Dr. Frank H. Bassett was league president 1912–1914, 1916, 1922–1924, and 1935–1937, through the active times and the inactive. Hopkinsville, Kentucky was represented for 28 of the 31 active seasons of the Kitty League, while Paducah, Kentucky made it for 23.

== League name revived ==
In 2004, the league moniker was reincarnated, as a summer collegiate baseball league called the "KIT League" was formed. Members of the KIT League featured some of the former Kitty League cities, who formed teams and revived their previous monikers, such as the Fulton Railroaders, Owensboro Oilers and Union City Greyhounds. The KIT League is now defunct, with the teams having evolved to form the currently active ten–team Ohio Valley League in 2010.

== Media ==
The league history was the subject of a book. The Kitty League was written by Joshua Maxwell and Kevin McCann and published in 2012.

== Cities represented ==
- Bowling Green, Kentucky:
  - Bowling Green Barons (1939–1942)
- Cairo, Illinois:
  - Cairo Egyptians (1903, 1912–1914, 1922–1924, 1946–1948)
  - Cairo Champions (1904)
  - Cairo Giants (1905–1906)
  - Cairo Dodgers (1949–1950)
- Central City, Kentucky:
  - Central City Reds (1954)
- Clarksville, Tennessee:
  - Clarksville Villagers (1903)
  - Clarksville Grays (1904)
  - Clarksville Volunteers (1910, 1913, 1916)
  - Clarksville Billies (1911)
  - Clarksville Rebels (1912)
  - Clarksville Boosters (1914)
  - Clarksville Owls (1946)
  - Clarksville Colts (1947
  - Clarksville Cats (1948–1949)
- Danville, Illinois:
  - Danville Old Soldiers (1906)
- Dawson Springs, Kentucky:
  - Dawson Springs Resorters (1916)
- Dyersburg, Tennessee:
  - Dyersburg Forked Deers (1923–1924)
- Evansville, Indiana:
  - Evansville Yankees (1912)
- Fulton, Kentucky:
  - Fulton Colonels (1911);
  - Fulton Railroaders (1922–1924, 1949–1951)
  - Fulton Eagles (1936–1938)
  - Fulton Tigers (1939–1942)
  - Fulton Chicks (1946–1948)
  - Fulton Lookouts (1952–1955)
- Harrisburg, Illinois:
  - Harrisburg Merchants (1910)
  - Harrisburg Miners (1911)
  - Harrisburg Coal Miners (1913)
- Henderson, Kentucky:
  - Henderson Hens (1903, 1905, 1911–1914, 1916)
  - Henderson Blue Birds (1904)
- Hopkinsville, Kentucky:
  - Hopkinsville Hoppers (1903, 1910–1914, 1916, 1922–1923, 1935–1942, 1946–1954)
  - Hopkinsville Browns (1904)
- Jackson, Tennessee:
  - Jackson Railroaders (1903)
  - Jackson Climbers (1911)
  - Jackson Blue Jays (1924)
  - Jackson Generals (1935–1942, 1950–1954)
- Jacksonville, Illinois:
  - Jacksonville Jacks (1906)
- Lexington, Tennessee:
  - Lexington Giants (1935–1938)
- Madisonville, Kentucky:
  - Madisonville Miners (1916, 1922, 1946–1955)
- Mattoon, Illinois & Charleston, Illinois:
  - Mattoon-Charleston Canaries (1906)
- Mayfield, Kentucky:
  - Mayfield Pantsmakers (1922–1924)
  - Mayfield Clothiers (1936–1938, 1946–1955)
  - Mayfield Browns (1939–1941)
- McLeansboro, Illinois:
  - McLeansboro Miners (1910–1911)
- Milan, Tennessee & Trenton, Tennessee:
  - Milan-Trenton Twins (1923)
- Owensboro, Kentucky:
  - Owensboro Distillers (1903, 1914, 1916)
  - Owensboro Pirates (1936)
  - Owensboro Oilers (1937–1942, 1946–1955)
- Paducah, Kentucky:
  - Paducah Chiefs (1903, 1912–1913, 1951–1955)
  - Paducah Indians (1904–1906, 1910, 1914, 1922–1923, 1936–1941)
  - Paducah Polecats (1911)
  - Paducah Red Birds (1935)
- Paris, Tennessee:
  - Paris Travelers (1922);
  - Paris Parisians (1923–1924)
- Portageville, Missouri:
  - Portageville Pirates (1935–1936)
- Princeton, Kentucky:
  - Princeton Infants (1905)
- Springfield, Tennessee:
  - Springfield Blanket Makers (1923)
- Trenton, Tennessee:
  - Trenton Reds (1922)
- Union City, Tennessee:
  - Union City Greyhounds (1935–1942, 1946–1952)
  - Union City Dodgers (1953–1955)
- Vincennes, Indiana:
  - Vincennes Alices (1903–1906, 1910, 1913)
  - Vincennes Hoosiers (1911)

== Championship titles ==
- 1903 – Cairo Egyptians
- 1904 – Paducah Indians
- 1905 – Paducah Indians
- 1906 – Vincennes Alices
- 1910 – McLeansboro Miners / Vincennes Alices
- 1911 – Fulton Colonels / Hopkinsville Hoppers
- 1912 – Clarksville Rebels
- 1913 – Paducah Chiefs
- 1914 – Cairo Egyptians
- 1916 – Clarksville Volunteers
- 1922 – Mayfield Pantsmakers
- 1923 – Mayfield Pantsmakers
- 1924 – Dyersburg Forked Deers
- 1935 – None declared
- 1936 – Union City Greyhounds
- 1937 – Mayfield Clothiers
- 1938 – Jackson Generals
- 1939 – Bowling Green Barons
- 1940 – Jacksonville Generals
- 1941 – Mayfield Browns
- 1942 – Fulton Tigers
- 1946 – Owensboro Oilers
- 1947 – Hopkinsville Hoppers
- 1948 – Union City Greyhounds
- 1949 – Madisonville Miners
- 1950 – Mayfield Clothiers
- 1951 – Fulton Railroaders
- 1952 – Madisonville Miners
- 1953 – Paducah Chiefs
- 1954 – Union City Dodgers
- 1955 – Paducah Chiefs

== Standings and statistics ==
=== 1903 to 1906 ===
1903 Kentucky–Illinois–Tennessee League

Team standings	W	L	PCT	GB	Managers
Cairo Egyptians	67	41	.620	-	G.P. Eichenbarger
Clarksville Villagers	60	43	.583	4½	Claude Carlisle
Jackson Railroaders	53	52	.505	12½	Grant Gorman
Henderson Hens	48	60	.444	19	Peter Webber
Paducah Chiefs	47	59	.443	19	Sam Jackson / Roy Gage; Cooney Best
Hopkinsville Hoppers	45	63	.417	22	Frank Bassett / Otho Mullen
Owensboro Distillers	8	3	.727	NA	Jack Sheridan / Rolla Jackson
Vincennes Alices	11	18	.379	NA	Harry Chaney / Jack Tuite

Owensboro folded June 1; Vincennes folded June 22

1904 Kentucky–Illinois–Tennessee League

Team standings	W	L	PCT	GB	Managers
Paducah Indians	73	48	.603	-	John Ray / Red Gilliam
Cairo Champions	72	49	.595	1	P.C. Scullin
Clarksville Grays	64	58	.525	9½	Senter Rainey
Henderson Blue Birds	54	68	.443	19½	Clyde McNutt
Hopkinsville Browns	52	68	.433	20½	F.B. Armstrong / William Hancock
Vincennes Alices	50	73	.407	23½	Bill Popp / Luke Duffy; Harry Eichler / Weed

1905 Kentucky–Illinois–Tennessee League - schedule

Team standings	W	L	PCT	GB	Managers
Paducah Indians	68	35	.660	-	Harry Lloyd
Vincennes Alices	65	41	.613	4½	Eddie Kolb
Cairo Giants	45	57	.447	22	Dan McCarthy
Princeton Infants	46	61	.430	24	R. Meredith / John Ray
Henderson Hens	29	47	.382	NA	Harry Kubitz
Hopkinsville Browns	31	44	.413	NA	Lou Rutledge

Henderson and Hopkinsville disbanded July 18
Season was shortened with National Association permission to August 17, due to yellow fever epidemic.
Playoff: Vincennes 7 games, Paducah 6

1906 Kentucky–Illinois–Tennessee League - schedule

Team standings	W	L	PCT	GB	Managers
Vincennes Alices	79	49	.608	-	Eddie Kolb
Jacksonville Jacks	67	58	.536	9	Frank Belt
Cairo Giants	68	61	.527	10	Dan McCarthy
Danville Old Soldiers	58	69	.457	19	Jake Wortham / Ed Bauer
Paducah Indians	57	69	.452	19½	Harry Lloyd
Mattoon-Charleston Canaries	54	74	.422	23½	Bob Berryhill / Jack McCarthy

Player statistics
Player	Team	Stat	Tot	Player	Team	Stat	Tot
Bill Dithridge	Cairo	BA	.329	Hub Perdue	Vincennes	W	25
Andy Lotshaw	Jacksonville	Runs	70	Hub Perdue	Vincennes	SO	260
Frank Long	Cairo	Hits	162	Phil Chenault	Vincennes	PCT	.700 14–6
Andy Lotshaw	Jacksonville	HR	11				

=== 1910 to 1916 ===
1910 Kentucky–Illinois–Tennessee League - 1st half schedule - 2nd half schedule

Team overall standings	W	L	PCT	GB	Managers
Vincennes Alices	64	54	.542	-	John Nairn
Clarksville Volunteers	55	60	.478	7½	M.O. Bridges / William McAndrews
Paducah Indians	55	64	.462	9½	Louis Angermeier / Eddie Gilligan
Hopkinsville Hoppers	50	68	.424	14	Dave Anderson / John Ray
McLeansboro Miners	40	18	.690	NA	Ollie Gfoerer
Harrisburg Merchants	29	29	.500	NA	Ira Hastings

McLeansboro and Harrisburg were added for the second half July 24
Playoff: Cancelled; Vincennes and McLeansboro were declared co-champions

Player statistics
Player	Team	Stat	Tot	Player	Team	Stat	Tot
John Nairn	Vincennes	BA	.285	Lyman Johnson	Vincennes	W	20
Arista DeHaven	Vincennes	Runs	54	Lyman Johnson	Vincennes	SO	182
Stewart Brown; Walter Jantzen	Hopkinsville; Vincennes	Hits	99	Clarence Kraft	McLeansboro	PCT	.867 13–2
Brown Keene; Clarence Kraft	Clarksville; McLeansboro	HR	4				

1911 Kentucky–Illinois–Tennessee League - schedule

Team standings	W	L	PCT	GB	Managers
Hopkinsville Hoppers	78	46	.629	-	John Nairn
Fulton Colonels	67	58	.536	11½	Nig Langdon / John Blakemore
McLeansboro Miners / Henderson Hens	65	58	.528	12½	Miles Bradshaw / John Stelle
Vincennes Hoosiers	62	59	.512	14½	Charlie Gosnell
Paducah Polecats	58	64	.475	19	Ollie Pickering
Cairo Egyptians	58	67	.464	20½	Morris Michaels
Harrisburg Miners / Jackson Climbers	53	68	.438	23½	Ira Hastings / Nathan Reiser; Eugene Fulghum
Clarksville Billies	51	71	.418	26	Johnny Siegle / Gene Curtis

McLeansboro (19–15) moved to Henderson June 20; Harrisburg (8–15) moved to Jackson
Playoff: Cancelled due to inclement weather; Fulton and Hopkinsville declared co-champions

Player statistics
Player	Team	Stat	Tot
Ernie Gust	Harrisburg/Jackson	BA	.354
Harry Heckert	Fulton	Runs	86
Ernie Gust	Harrisburg/Jackson	Hits	148
Ernie Calbert	Harrisburg/Jackson	HR	10

1912 Kentucky–Illinois–Tennessee League - schedule

Team standings	W	L	PCT	GB	Managers
Clarksville Rebels	68	29	.701	-	Senter Rainey
Henderson Hens	52	48	.520	17½	Offa Neal / Ward Snyder
Evansville Yankees	47	52	.475	22	Charles Barton
Paducah Chiefs	45	55	.450	24½	John Nairn / Dave Anderson
Hopkinsville Hoppers	44	54	.449	24½	Dudley Lewis / Nig Langdon; Tommy Atkins
Cairo Egyptians	41	59	.410	28½	Carl Page / Bill Everett; Tim Flood

Player statistics
Player	Team	Stat	Tot	Player	Team	Stat	Tot
Patrick Bohannon	Paducah	BA	.326	Ira Nicks	Clarksville	W	22
A.G. Weber	Hopkinsville	Runs	72	Charles Humphrey	Clarksville	SO	157
Henry Hughe	Cairo	Hits	110	Jim Coleman	Clarksville	PCT	.760 19–6
Al Basham	Clarksville	HR	12				

1913 Kentucky–Illinois–Tennessee League

Team standings	W	L	PCT	GB	Managers
Paducah Chiefs	80	47	.630	-	Art Brouthers
Clarksville Volunteers	78	47	.624	1	Senter Rainey / William McAndrews
Hopkinsville Hoppers	73	53	.579	6½	Dave Anderson / George Kalkoff
Henderson Hens	70	55	.560	9	Ward Snyder
Owensboro Distillers	69	56	.552	10	William Long / Senter Rainey
Cairo Egyptians	57	68	.456	22	John Nairn / Clyde Kessling
Harrisburg Coal Miners	42	85	.331	38	Lewis Brooks / John Stelle
Vincennes Alices	34	92	.270	45½	Ollie Pickering / Bob Anderson; William McAndrews / John Nairn

Player statistics
Player	Team	Stat	Tot	Player	Team	Stat	Tot
Harry Heckert	Clarksville	BA	.345	Leslie Johnson	Hopkinsville	W	23
Lee Hart	Clarksville	Runs	102	Charles Humphrey	Clarksville	SO	240
Grady Burgess	Paducah	Hits	172	Clifford Snyder	Henderson	PCT	.917 11–1
P. Vogt	Hopkinsville	HR	13				

1914 Kentucky–Illinois–Tennessee League

Team standings	W	L	PCT	GB	Managers
Cairo Egyptians	77	46	.626	-	John Herbert
Owensboro Distillers	66	55	.545	10	William Long / Ollie Pickering
Henderson Hens	64	58	.525	12½	Ward Snyder
Paducah Indians	59	65	.476	18½	Dow Vandyne / Arthur Brouthers
Clarksville Boosters	22	39	.361	NA	James Coleman
Hopkinsville Hoppers	20	45	.308	NA	George Kalkoff

Clarksville and Hopkinsville disbanded July 10

Player statistics
Player	Team	Stat	Tot	Player	Team	Stat	Tot
James Allen	Henderson	BA	.307	John Grogan	Cairo	W	22
Ed Wise	Cairo	Runs	70	John Grogan	Cairo	SO	143
Charlie Gosnell	Paducah	Hits	135	Win Frewen	Cairo	PCT	.792 19–5

1915 Kentucky–Illinois–Tennessee League
The Kentucky–Illinois–Tennessee League did not play in 1915 during World War I

1916 Kentucky–Illinois–Tennessee League - schedule

Team standings	W	L	PCT	GB	Managers
Clarksville Volunteers	50	24	.676	-	Lemarr Boykin
Henderson Hens	44	30	.595	6	Connie Walsh
Owensboro Distillers	43	31	.581	7	Sandy Murray / Buzz Wetzel
Dawson Springs Resorters	33	41	.446	17	Arthur Goodwin / Louis Eith; Senter Rainey
Madisonville Miners	31	41	.431	18	Doc Cummings / Leo Angiemeier
Hopkinsville Hoppers	22	56	.282	25	Bill Schwartz

Madisonville folded August 2; League folded August 4

Player statistics
Player	Team	Stat	Tot
Ben Shaw	Clarksville	BA	.361
William Pike	Henderson	Hits	98

=== 1922 to 1924 ===
1922 Kentucky–Illinois–Tennessee League

Team overall standings	W	L	PCT	GB	Managers
Madisonville Miners	73	39	.652	-	Neil Deighan
Hopkinsville Hoppers	62	51	.549	11½	Bill Catton / Art Nilson
Mayfield Pantsmakers	60	50	.545	12	Rudy Hulswitt
Paris Travelers	58	52	.527	14	Tuffy Fowlkes
Cairo Egyptians	56	56	.500	17	George Hughes / Jim Moore; Jack Herbert
Trenton Reds	56	56	.500	17	Red Reese / Andy Jarrell; G. Watson
Fulton Railroaders	41	68	.376	30½	Ralph Works / Senter Rainey
Paducah Indians	39	73	.348	34	Ollie Pickering / Lee Fairchild; Fred Dewitt / Hoke Dillinger

First place Madisonville stripped of second half title for rules violations & Second place Cairo disqualified for rules violations. Paris awarded second half title.
Finals: Mayfield 4 games, Paris 2

Player statistics
Player	Team	Stat	Tot	Player	Team	Stat	Tot
Mahlon Higby	Hopkinsville	BA	.385	Ed Holley	Madisonville	W	22
Mahlon Higby	Hopkinsville	Runs	101	Raymond Donovan	Madisonville	SO	141
Mahlon Higby	Hopkinsville	Hits	161	Perry Payne	Madisonville	ERA	2.40
Bill Brown	Hopkinsville	HR	19	Ed Holley; Jim Turner	Madisonville; Paris	PCT	.786 22–6.786 11–3

1923 Kentucky–Illinois–Tennessee League - schedule

Team standings	W	L	PCT	GB	Managers
Mayfield Pantsmakers	59	43	.578	-	Oren Mitchell / Tige Garrett
Fulton Railroaders	61	45	.575	-	Charles Holloway
Dyersburg Forked Deers	51	47	.520	6	Dutch Quellmalz
Paducah Indians	55	53	.509	7	Dolly Stark
Hopkinsville Hoppers	52	51	.505	7½	Ben Smith
Cairo Egyptians	48	57	.457	12½	Jack Herbert / Doc Bennett
Paris Parisians	46	55	.455	12½	Tuffy Fowlkes / Frank Dehaney
Springfield Blanketmakers / Milan-Trenton Twins	36	57	.387	18½	Buck Stapleton / Red Reese

Springfield (14–36) disbanded July 9; Springfield replaced in the second half by Milan-Trenton

1924 Kentucky–Illinois–Tennessee League

Team standings	W	L	PCT	GB	Managers
Dyersburg Forked Deers	60	48	.556	-	George Block / White; John Woodson
Paris Parisians	59	50	.541	1½	Dutch Quellmalz
Fulton Railroaders	62	65	.534	2	Dan Griner
Cairo Egyptians	55	56	.495	6½	John Dowell / Brown
Jackson Blue Jays	51	61	.455	11	Ward McDowell / George Block
Mayfield Pantsmakers	41	59	.410	15	Ben Koehler / Norm Thelan

Mayfield disbanded August 26
Playoffs: Dyersburg 4 games, Paris 0

Player statistics
Player	Team	Stat	Tot	Player	Team	Stat	Tot
Paul Kirby	Paris	BA	.342	Carlos Dunagan	Dyersburg	W	19
Louis Neibert	Dyersburg	Runs	62	Carlos Dunagan	Dyersburg	PCT	.905 19–2
Paul Kirby	Paris	Hits	137				

=== 1935 to 1939 ===
1935 Kentucky–Illinois–Tennessee League - schedule

Team standings	W	L	PCT	GB	Managers
Jackson Generals	50	42	.543	-	Tony Leidl / Joe Wesche; Wilbur Bickham
Union City Greyhounds	49	43	.533	1	Rip Fanning / Joe Fields; Ross Young
Hopkinsville Hoppers	46	45	.505	3½	John Suther
Portageville Pirates	44	46	.489	5	Pat Patterson / Herb Welch; L.A. Harris
Lexington Giants	43	46	.483	5½	John Antonelli
Paducah Red Birds	41	51	.446	9	George Griffin / Fred Glass; W.W. Hooks / Mel Ivanski; E.R. Jones

Playoffs: Jackson disqualified on September 1: Union City disqualified on September 3; Lexington awarded second half title. With widespread rules violations, league declared no formal champion.

Player statistics
Player	Team	Stat	Tot	Player	Team	Stat	Tot
Floyd Perryman	Paducah	BA	.359	Gene Nichols	Portageville	W	13
Harry Johnson	Hopkinsville	Runs	79	Allen Hayes	Union City	SO	161
Elmer Hankins	Lexington	Hits	108	Gene Nichols	Portageville	ERA	2.38
Lee Koller	Lexington	HR	10	Gene Nichols	Portageville	PCT	.765 13–4
Irwin Wolfe	Hopkinsville	RBI	58				

1936 Kentucky–Illinois–Tennessee League - schedule

Team standings	W	L	PCT	GB	Managers
Paducah Indians	73	45	.619	-	Ben Tincup
Union City Greyhounds	73	45	.619	-	Heinie Mueller / Bob Richards; Joe Sugden / Fred Hofmann
Lexington Giants	68	52	.567	6	John Antonelli / Rip Fanning; Dick Stewart
Jackson Generals	62	55	.530	10½	Wilbur Bickham / Herb Welch
Fulton Eagles	63	56	.529	10½	Kid Elberfeld
Portageville Pirates / Owensboro Pirates	52	67	.437	21½	Hughie Wise
Hopkinsville Hoppers	46	72	.390	27	Ralph McRight / Benny Mus; Jesse Petty / Budd Adams; Lyle Judy
Mayfield Clothiers	37	82	.311	36½	Les Sweetland / Bum Robinson; Floyd Wheeler

Portageville (26–35) moved to Owensboro July 17
Playoff: Union City 1 game, Paducah 0. Paducah folded

Player statistics
Player	Team	Stat	Tot	Player	Team	Stat	Tot
Clyde Batts	Fulton	BA	.368	Allen Hayes; Gene Thompson; Jesse Webb	Paducah; Paducah; Jackson	W	18
Wayne Blackburn	Paducah	Runs	124	Jesse Webb	Jackson	SO	227
Clyde Batts	Fulton	Hits	176	Dick Stewart	Lexington	PCT	.762 16–5
Averette Thompson	Union City	RBI	125				
Joe Bestudik	Paducah	HR	16				

1937 Kentucky–Illinois–Tennessee League - schedule

Team standings	W	L	PCT	GB	Managers
Union City Greyhounds	73	46	.613	-	John Antonelli
Hopkinsville Hoppers	71	50	.587	3	Red Smith
Fulton Eagles	64	56	.533	9½	Herb Porter
Mayfield Clothiers	63	57	.525	10	Clarence Mitchell / Walter Holke
Jackson Generals	63	57	.525	10	Herb Welch
Lexington Giants	60	61	.496	14	Rip Fanning
Owensboro Oilers	56	65	.463	18	Hughie Wise
Paducah Indians	31	89	.258	42½	Hugh McMullen / Erv Brame; Lee Keller / Ralph Bishop; George Block / Pete Mondino

Playoffs: Mayfield won 1 game playoff for fourth place. Mayfield 3 games, Union City 0; Fulton 3 games, Hopkinsville 1
Finals: Mayfield 4 games, Fulton 1

Player statistics
Player	Team	Stat	Tot	Player	Team	Stat	Tot
Dave Bartosch	Union City	BA	.337	Elmer Wenning	Fulton	W	20
Vincent Mullen	Mayfield	Runs	106	Jesse Webb	Jackson	SO	241
Dave Bartosch	Union City	Hits	170	George Sauer	Union City	ERA	2.37
Dave Bartosch	Union City	RBI	103	George Sauer	Union City	PCT	.731 19–7
Carl Cooper	Fulton	HR	13				

1938 Kentucky–Illinois–Tennessee League - schedule

Team standings	W	L	PCT	GB	Managers
Hopkinsville Hoppers	76	53	.589	-	Red Smith
Jackson Generals	74	54	.578	1½	Herb Welch
Lexington Giants	66	59	.528	8	Rip Fanning
Mayfield Clothiers	65	60	.520	9	Benny Tate
Paducah Indians	66	63	.512	10	Pete Mondino
Owensboro Oilers	66	64	.508	10½	Hughie Wise
Fulton Eagles	55	75	.423	21½	George Clonts
Union City Greyhounds	45	85	.346	31½	Hap Bohl

Playoffs: Hopkinsville 3 games, Mayfield 1; Jackson 3 games, Lexington 0
Finals: Jackson 2 games, Hopkinsville 1. Finals ended September 22 due to poor weather

Player statistics
Player	Team	Stat	Tot	Player	Team	Stat	Tot
Augie Bergamo	Paducah	BA	.355	Glen Dacus	Jackson	W	22
Harold Peck	Hopkinsville	Runs	125	Chauncey Scott	Paducah	SO	282
Harold Peck	Hopkinsville	Hits	187	Glen Dacus	Jackson	ERA	2.42
Herb Wilson	Owensboro	RBI	95	Glen Dacus	Jackson	PCT	.733 22–8
James Poole	Lexington	HR	18				

1939 Kentucky–Illinois–Tennessee League - schedule

Team standings	W	L	PCT	GB	Managers
Mayfield Browns	76	49	.608	-	Benny Tate
Bowling Green Barons	75	51	.595	1½	Rip Fanning / Herb Welch
Owensboro Oilers	75	51	.595	1½	Hughie Wise
Jackson Generals	67	59	.532	9½	Vincent Mullen
Hopkinsville Hoppers	57	68	.456	19	Harry Griswold
Paducah Indians	57	69	.452	19½	Ben Tincup
Fulton Tigers	52	74	.413	24½	Charlie Eckert
Union City Greyhounds	44	82	.349	32½	Lee Johnson

Playoffs: Mayfield 3 games, Jackson 2; Bowling Green 3 games, Owensboro 0
Finals: Bowling Green 4 games, Mayfield 2

Player statistics
Player	Team	Stat	Tot	Player	Team	Stat	Tot
Vern Stephens	Mayfield	BA	.361	Elmer Haas	Bowling Green	W	25
Joe Morjoseph	Mayfield	Runs	120	Chauncey Scott	Union City	SO	213
Stan Stencel	Hopkinsville	Hits	184	William Scott	Mayfield	ERA	2.31
Vern Stephens	Mayfield	RBI	123	Howard Schumacher	Owensboro	PCT	.815 22–5
John Newman	Owensboro	HR	33				

=== 1946 to 1955 ===
1946 Kentucky–Illinois–Tennessee League - schedule

Team standings	W	L	PCT	GB	Managers
Owensboro Oilers	83	39	.680	-	Earl Browne
Hopkinsville Hoppers	73	53	.579	12	Calvin Chapman
Fulton Chicks	69	56	.552	15½	Hugh Holliday
Mayfield Clothiers	64	59	.520	19½	Eddie O'Connell
Clarksville Owls	58	67	.464	26½	Dick Luckey / Hod Lisenbee
Madisonville Miners	53	71	.427	31	Frank Zubik
Union City Greyhounds	52	72	.419	32	John Gill / Bill Sweatt; Jesse Webb
Cairo Egyptians	45	80	.360	39½	Frank Piet / Pep Rambert

Playoffs: Owensboro 3 games, Mayfield 1; Fulton 3 games, Hopkinsville 1
Finals: Owensboro 4 games Fulton 3

Player statistics
Player	Team	Stat	Tot	Player	Team	Stat	Tot
Earl Browne	Owensboro	BA	.429	Don McLeland	Mayfield	W	20
Ray Fletcher	Owensboro	Runs	126	Bob Schultz	Fulton	SO	361
Harold Boguskie	Hopkinsville	Hits	190	George Buickel	Owensboro	ERA	2.58
Ray Fletcher	Owensboro	RBI	140	George Buickel	Owensboro	PCT	.818 18–4
Ray Fletcher	Owensboro	HR	32				

1947 Kentucky–Illinois–Tennessee League - schedule

Team standings	W	L	PCT	GB	Managers
Owensboro Oilers	77	48	.616	-	Earl Browne
Mayfield Clothiers	72	52	.581	4½	Shan Deniston
Hopkinsville Hoppers	69	56	.552	8	Skeeter Scalzi
Madisonville Miners	69	56	.552	8	Frank Zubik
Fulton Chicks	68	57	.544	9	John Gill / Elmer Gray; Fred Biggs
Cairo Egyptians	53	73	.421	24½	Ray Clonts / Johnny Hobbs; Pudge Powers
Union City Greyhounds	51	74	.408	26	Steve Bysco / Dutch Hoffman
Clarksville Colts	40	83	.325	36	Harley Boss / Joe Santomauro; John Gill

Playoffs: Hopkinsville 3 games, Owensboro 2; Madisonville 3 games, Mayfield 1
Finals: Hopkinsville 4 games, Madisonville 1

Player statistics
Player	Team	Stat	Tot	Player	Team	Stat	Tot
Earl Browne	Owensboro	BA	.424	William Bordt	Mayfield	W	21
Bob Proulx	Madisonville	Runs	126	John Hobbs	Cairo	SO	236
Jerry Majercik	Union City	Hits	176	Joseph Dworak	Mayfield	ERA	2.09
Richard Szpond	Madisonville	RBI	128	George King	Madisonville	PCT	.789 15–4
Joe Richardson	Hopkinsville	HR	18				

1948 Kentucky–Illinois–Tennessee League - schedule

Team standings	W	L	PCT	GB	Managers
Hopkinsville Hoppers	85	41	.675	-	Vito Tamulis
Union City Greyhounds	79	46	.632	5½	Tony Rensa
Owensboro Oilers	74	50	.597	10	Rex Carr
Madisonville Miners	67	55	.549	16	George Mathawuser / Conrad Juelke; Robert Balance
Fulton Chicks	57	68	.456	27½	Fred Biggs / Bud Burns; Ivan Kuester
Clarksville Cats	49	77	.389	36	Stan Andrews / Hod Lisenbee
Cairo Egyptians	44	81	.352	40½	Hugh Holliday / Norbert Hall
Mayfield Clothiers	43	80	.350	40½	Michael Sertich / Ken Jungels; Carroll Peterson

Playoffs: Madisonville 3 games, Hopkinsville 2; Union City 3 games, Owensboro 2
Finals: Union City 4 games, Madisonville 0

Player statistics
Player	Team	Stat	Tot	Player	Team	Stat	Tot
Lester Severin	Cairo	BA	.381	Clarence Neuman	Union City	W	18
John Kall	Hopkinsville	Runs	139	Donald Schudlach	Madisonville	SO	237
Lester Severin	Cairo	Hits	181	Vito Tamulis	Hopkinsville	ERA	2.32
Bud Hutson	Union City	RBI	129	Jack Barber	Owensboro	PCT	.889 16–2
John Kall	Hopkinsville	HR	23				

1949 Kentucky–Illinois–Tennessee League - schedule

Team standings	W	L	PCT	GB	Managers
Owensboro Oilers	82	40	.672	-	Bill Adair
Cairo Dodgers	74	51	.592	9½	Bill Hart
Hopkinsville Hoppers	68	56	.548	15	John Mueller
Madisonville Miners	67	57	.540	16	Joe Demasi
Union City Greyhounds	65	60	.520	18½	Tony Rensa / Rudy York
Fulton Railroaders	62	61	.504	20½	Ivan Kuester
Clarksville Cats	40	85	.320	43½	Hod Lisenbee
Mayfield Clothiers	38	86	.306	45	Bill Enos

Playoffs: Madisonville 3 games, Owensboro 0; Cairo 3 games, Hopkinsville 2
Finals: Madisonville 2 games, Cairo 1, series cut short by bad weather

Player statistics
Player	Team	Stat	Tot	Player	Team	Stat	Tot
Bill Hart	Cairo	BA	.404	Harley Grossman	Fulton	W	19
Don Hazleton	Owensboro	Runs	116	Fred Wagner	Owensboro	SO	184
Joe DeMasi	Madisonville	Hits	163	Joe Linn	Union City	ERA	2.28
Joe DeMasi	Madisonville	RBI	133	Bill Bunch	Owensboro	PCT	.842 16–3
Bill Adair	Owensboro	HR	23				

1950 Kentucky–Illinois–Tennessee League - schedule

Team standings	W	L	PCT	GB	Managers
Mayfield Clothiers	73	45	.619	-	Jerry Gardner
Fulton Railroaders	69	50	.580	4½	Ivan Kuester
Jackson Generals	68	52	.567	6	Glen Stewart
Owensboro Oilers	64	51	.557	7½	Travis Jackson
Madisonville Miners	63	51	.553	8	George Mitro / Skeeter Webb
Hopkinsville Hoppers	60	60	.500	14	Joe DeMasi
Union City Greyhounds	43	72	.374	28½	John Mueller
Cairo Dodgers	26	85	.234	43½	Harold Seawright / Paul Box

Playoffs: Mayfield 3 games, Owensboro 2; Fulton 3 games, Jackson 2
Finals: Mayfield 1 game, Fulton 0, finals ended - poor weather

Player statistics
Player	Team	Stat	Tot	Player	Team	Stat	Tot
Joe Andrews	Owensboro	BA	.373	Don McMahon	Owensboro	W	20
Maurice Partain	Jackson	Runs	113	Don McMahon	Owensboro	SO	143
Ned Waldrop	Fulton	Hits	150	Don McMahon	Owensboro	ERA	2.72
Ned Waldrop	Fulton	RBI	130	Ed Wilson	Madisonville	PCT	.826 19–4
Ned Waldrop	Fulton	HR	28				

1951 Kentucky–Illinois–Tennessee League - schedule

Team standings	W	L	PCT	GB	Managers
Fulton Railroaders	73	46	.613	-	Sam Lamitina
Owensboro Oilers	71	48	.597	2	Wayne Blackburn
Mayfield Clothiers	66	53	.555	7	Jerry Gardner
Paducah Chiefs	64	55	.538	9	Robert Stanton
Jackson Generals	59	61	.492	14½	Glen Stewart
Union City Greyhounds	57	63	.475	16½	Charles Moore / Curtis Englebright; Jay Stasko
Madisonville Miners	46	73	.387	27	Burl Storie
Hopkinsville Hoppers	41	78	.345	32	Steve Carter / Vito Tamulis

Playoffs: Fulton 3 games, Paducah 2; Owensboro 3 games, Mayfield 1
Finals: Fulton 4 games, Owensboro 0

Player statistics
Player	Team	Stat	Tot	Player	Team	Stat	Tot
Wayne Blackburn	Owensboro	BA	.364	Walter Bryja	Fulton	W	24
Wayne Blackburn	Owensboro	Runs	116	Scott Keeney	Mayfield	SO	212
Harold Seawright	Jackson	Hits	161	William Howard	Paducah	ERA	1.29
Harold Seawright	Jackson	RBI	122	Scott Keeney	Mayfield	PCT	.813 13–3
Joe Duhem	Mayfield	HR	18				

1952 Kentucky–Illinois–Tennessee League - schedule

Team standings	W	L	PCT	GB	Managers
Fulton Lookouts	82	37	.689	-	Sam Lamitina
Paducah Chiefs	67	53	.558	15½	Robert Stanton / Gregory Mason; Robert Stanton
Madisonville Miners	65	55	.542	17½	Everett Robinson
Union City Greyhounds	63	56	.529	19	Frank Radler
Owensboro Oilers	55	65	.458	27½	Pud Miller / Moose Shetler
Hopkinsville Hoppers	50	70	.417	32½	Larry Brunke
Jackson Generals	48	71	.403	34	Vince Pankovits / Dominic Italiano; Mickey O'Neil
Mayfield Clothiers	47	70	.402	34	Red Barrett

Playoffs: Union City 3 games, Fulton 2; Madisonville 3 games, Paducah 1
Finals: Madisonville 3 games, Union City 0

Player statistics
Player	Team	Stat	Tot	Player	Team	Stat	Tot
Howard Weeks	Fulton	BA	.370	Albert Brown	Fulton	W	25
Harley Pierce	Fulton	Runs	120	Michael Donovan	Jackson	SO	345
James Jaynes	Owensboro/Union City	Hits	166	Walter Dypko	Paducah	ERA	2.17
John Rothenhausler	Union City	RBI	138	Don Menner	Fulton	PCT	.941 16–1
Jack Hall	Owensboro	HR	21				

1953 Kentucky–Illinois–Tennessee League - schedule

Team standings	W	L	PCT	GB	Managers
Fulton Lookouts	70	50	.583	-	Sam Lamitina
Madisonville Miners	67	53	.558	3	Everett Robinson
Paducah Chiefs	67	53	.558	3	Lee Peterson
Hopkinsville Hoppers	59	60	.496	10½	Norman Wilson / Edward Wright
Mayfield Clothiers	58	61	.487	11½	Austin Knickerbocker
Jackson Generals	58	62	.483	12	Mickey O'Neil
Union City Dodgers	51	69	.425	19	Earl Naylor
Owensboro Oilers	49	71	.408	28	Marvin Crater

Playoffs: Fulton 2 games, Hopkinsville 1; Paducah 2 games, Madisonville 0
Finals: Paducah 3 games, Fulton 0

Player statistics
Player	Team	Stat	Tot	Player	Team	Stat	Tot
Howard Weeks	Fulton	BA	.373	Ronald Foster	Fulton	W	21
Howard Warrell; William Kasper	Hopkinsville	Runs	113	Rodriguez Arias	Madisonville	SO	247
William Sells	Mayfield	Hits	157	Lee Peterson	Paducah	ERA	2.69
Howard Warrell	Hopkinsville	RBI	129	Leo Bacon	Hopkinsville	PCT	.722 13–5
Austin Knickerbocker; Howard Warrell	Mayfield; Hopkinsville	HR	26				

1954 Kentucky–Illinois–Tennessee League - schedule

Team standings	W	L	PCT	GB	Managers
Union City Dodgers	76	40	.655	-	Earl Naylor
Fulton Lookouts	69	47	.595	7	Red Mincy
Owensboro Oilers	65	49	.570	10	Marvin Crater
Mayfield Clothiers	64	52	.552	12	Red Davis
Madisonville Miners	61	52	.540	13½	Bob Latshaw / William Close
Hopkinsville Hoppers	58	59	.496	18½	Edward Wright / Bearl Brooks; Richard Ramsey
Paducah Chiefs	45	67	.402	29	Harold Contini / Lee Peterson
Central City Reds	13	44	.228	NA	Joe Richardson / Hayden Ray
Jackson Generals	1	44	.022	NA	Louis Lucas

Jackson folded June 1, after 36 consecutive losses; Central City began July 5
Playoff: Union City 4 games, Madisonville 2

Player statistics
Player	Team	Stat	Tot	Player	Team	Stat	Tot
Allan Shinn	Union City	BA	.391	Rene Masip	Union City	W	18
Ned Waldrop	Fulton	Runs	114	James Major	Union City	SO	174
William Pass	Madisonville	Hits	162	Charles Templeton	Union City	ERA	2.13
Ned Waldrop	Fulton	RBI	159	Rene Masip	Union City	PCT	.783 18–5
Ned Waldrop	Fulton	HR	22				

1955 Kentucky–Illinois–Tennessee League - schedule

Team standings	W	L	PCT	GB	Managers
Paducah Chiefs	64	39	.621	-	Homer Ray Wilson
Mayfield Clothiers	65	43	.602	1½	Dave Garcia
Owensboro Oilers	53	56	.486	14	Walter Lance / Ken Silvestri
Union City Dodgers	50	57	.467	16	Joe Hauser
Fulton Lookouts	43	66	.394	24	Ned Waldrop / Sam Lamitina; Mel Simons / Robert Harmon
Madisonville Miners	23	37	.383	NA	William Chase

Madisonville folded July 7
Playoff: Paducah declared champion

Player statistics
Player	Team	Stat	Tot	Player	Team	Stat	Tot
Ed Herstek	Mayfield	BA	.359	Tom Baker	Paducah	W	16
Fred Studstill	Mayfield	Runs	111	Joe Shipley	Mayfield	SO	174
Fred Studstill	Mayfield	Hits	150	Darold Satchell	Paducah	ERA	2.85
Edward Russell	Mayfield	RBI	114	Tom Baker	Paducah	PCT	.762 16–5
Paul Bentley	Mayfield	HR	24				
