= Paris Parisians (KITTY League) =

Former Minor League baseball team

- 1922–1924; Paris, Tennessee

Minor league affiliations
- Class: Class D (1922–1924)
- League: Kentucky–Illinois–Tennessee League (1922–1924)

Major league affiliations
- Team: Unaffiliated (1922–1924)

Minor league titles
- League titles (0): None
- Second-half titles (2): 1922; 1924

Team data
- Name: Paris Parisians (1923–1924); Paris Travelers (1922)
- Ballpark: Barton Field (1922–1924)

The Paris Parisians were a Minor League Baseball team that played in the Class D Kentucky–Illinois–Tennessee League (KITTY League) from 1922 to 1924. They were located in Paris, Tennessee, and played their home games at Barton Field. The team was known as the Paris Travelers in the 1922 season, but they played as the Parisians from 1923 to 1924.

== History ==
The team began competition in 1922 as the Paris Travelers playing at Barton Field. They opened their inaugural season on May 16 with a 10–0 home win against the Fulton Railroaders. Managed by Tuffy Fowlkes, the Travelers won the second half of the split season after several games involving the Cairo Egyptians, Hopkinsville Hoppers, and Madisonville Miners were thrown out. In the best-of-seven series for the KITTY League championship, Paris was defeated by the first half champion Mayfield Pantsmakers, 4–2. Their season record was 58–52 (.527).

They were renamed the Paris Parisians in 1923. On July 19, Jim Turner pitched a 10–0 no-hitter against the Milan-Trenton Twins at Barton Field. They compiled a season record of 46–55 (.455) but failed to win either half of the season. Their record for the season was 46–55 (.455).

Under manager Earl Quellmalz, the Parisians won the second half of the 1924 campaign on the last day of the season. On the next-to-last day, the league president threw out three wins belonging to the Jackson Blue Jays because they exceeded the limit of Class C players on their roster. This moved Paris into a tie for first with Jackson. The two teams were scheduled to meet on September 6 to close the season and decide the second half title. Paris won, 8–4, to advance to the KITTY League championship series. The Parisians were swept by the Dyersburg Forked Deers, 4–0, in the best-of-seven series. Paris' final game was a 4–1 loss at Dyersburg on September 16. In total, they went 59–50 (.541) on the year. Over all three seasons of competition, Paris' all-time regular season record was 163–157 (.509).

== Season-by-season results ==
Season	Regular season				Postseason			Ref.
Season	Record	Win %	Finish	GB	Record	Win %	Result	Ref.
1922	58–52	.527	4th	14	2–4	.333	Result	Won second half title Lost championship vs. Mayfield Pantmakers, 4–2
1923	46–55	.455	8th	12 1/2	—	—	—	
1924	59–50	.541	2nd	1 1/2	0–4	.000	Won second half title Lost championship vs. Dyersburg Forked Deers, 4–0	
Totals	163–157	.509	—	—	2–8	.200	—	—

== Notable players ==
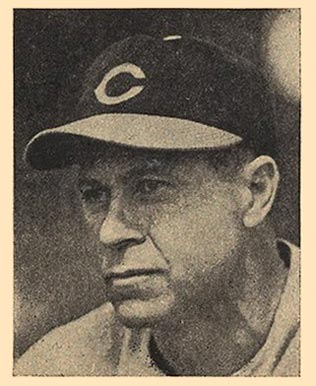
Jim Turner (1923–1924) went on to be an MLB All-Star (1938) and play on the 1940 World Series champion Cincinnati Reds.

Six Paris players also played in at least one game in Major League Baseball during their careers. These players and their seasons with Paris were:

- Ben Cantwell (1923)
- Tom Jenkins (1923)
- Jimmy Moore (1923)
- Harry Rice (1922)
- Jim Turner (1923–1924)
- Herb Welch (1922–1923)
