= Owensboro Oilers =

- 1936–1955; (1936–1942, 1946–1955); Owensboro, Kentucky

Minor league affiliations
- Class: Class D (1936–1955)
- League: Kitty League (1936–1955)

Major league affiliations
- Team: New York Yankees (1953–1955); Boston Braves (1946–1950); Boston Red Sox (1941–1942); Boston Bees (1939–1940); Cleveland Indians (1937–1938); Pittsburgh Pirates (1936)

Minor league titles
- League titles (1): 1946

Team data
- Name: Owensboro Oilers (1937–1955); Owensboro Pirates (1936)
- Ballpark: Miller Field (1938–1955); ORC Field (1937); Southside Park (1936)

The Owensboro Oilers were a minor league baseball club, based in Owensboro, Kentucky, from 1936 until 1955. The team was a member of the class-D level Kentucky–Illinois–Tennessee League (or Kitty League). The team was originally formed in 1935 as the Portageville Pirates and represented Portageville, Missouri, in the league. On July 17, 1936, the Portageville Pirates moved to Owensboro after posting a 26–35 record. The team was listed in the record books for 1936 as Portageville-Owensboro Pirates, or as the Owensboro Pirates after the move. The following year, the team was renamed the Owensboro Oilers.

The Oilers and Pirates were preceded in Kitty League play by the Owensboro Distillers. The Distillers played in the 1903, 1913, 1914 and 1916 seasons.

== Notable alumni ==
- Tony Kubek (1954) Inducted Baseball Hall of Fame, 2008 Ford C. Frick award
- Travis Jackson (1950, MGR) Inducted Baseball Hall of Fame, 1982
- Sam Dente (1941)
- Don McMahon (1950) MLB All-Star
- Ollie Pickering (1914)
- Chuck Tanner (1946–1947) Manager: 1979 World Series Champion Pittsburgh Pirates
- Lee Thomas (1954) 2 x MLB All-Star

== Year-by-year records ==
Year	Record	Finish	Manager	Playoffs
1935	44–46	4th	Pat Patterson / Herb Welch / L.A. Harris	no champion declared
1936	52–67	6th	Hughie Wise	
1937	56–65	7th	Hughie Wise	
1938	66–64	6th	Hughie Wise	
1939	75–51	3rd	Hughie Wise	Lost semi-finals vs. Bowling Green Barons (0–3)
1940	69–57	3rd	Hughie Wise / Harold Sueme	
1941	58–68	6th	Hughie Wise	
1942	16–32	5th	Wally Schang	League disbanded June 19
1946	83–39	1st	Earl Browne	League Champs; Won semi-finals vs. Mayfield Clothiers (3–1); Won League Championship vs. Fulton Chicks (4–3)
1947	77–48	1st	Earl Browne	Lost semi-finals vs. Hopkinsville Hoppers (2–3)
1948	74–50	3rd	Rex Carr	Lost semi-finals vs. Union City Greyhounds (2–3)
1949	82–40	1st	Bill Adair	Lost semi-finals vs. Madisonville Miners (0–3)
1950	64–51	4th	Travis Jackson	Lost semi-finals vs. Mayfield Clothiers (2–3)
1951	71–48	2nd	Wayne Blackburn	Won semi-finals vs. Mayfield Clothiers (3–1); Lost League Championship vs. Fulton Railroaders (0–4)
1952	55–65	5th	Pud Miller / Moose Shetler	
1953	49–71	8th	Marvin Crater	
1954	65–49	3rd	Marvin Crater	
1955	53–56	3rd	Walter Lance / Ken Silvestri	
