= Clarksville Colts =

- 1946–1949; Clarksville, Tennessee

Minor league affiliations
- Class: Class D (1946–1949)
- League: Kentucky–Illinois–Tennessee League (1946–1949)

Major league affiliations
- Team: Unaffiliated (1946–1949)

Minor league titles
- League titles (0): None

Team data
- Name: Clarksville Colts (1947–1949); Clarksville Owls (1946)
- Ballpark: Goodrich Park (1946–1949)

The Clarksville Colts were a Minor League Baseball team that played in the Class D Kentucky–Illinois–Tennessee League (KITTY League) from 1946 to 1949. They were located in Clarksville, Tennessee, and played their home games at Goodrich Park. The team was known as the Clarskville Owls in 1946 before operating as the Clarksville Colts from 1947 to 1949.

== History ==
Clarksville, Tennessee, had been previously represented in the Kentucky–Illinois–Tennessee League by the Clarksville Villagers in 1903 and the Clarksville Grays in 1904. From 1910 to 1916 the city fielded a team known as the Clarksville Volunteers (1910 and 1916), Clarksville Billies (1911), Clarksville Rebels (1912), and Clarksville Boosters (1913–1914).

After a 39-year absence, Clarksville returned to the KITTY League in 1946 with the Colts, who played their home games at Goodrich Park. They lost their season opener, 11–0, to the Hopkinsville Hoppers before a home audience of around 3,000 people on May 8. The Colts gained their first win the next evening, beating the Hoppers 11–6. Clarksville ended their first season in fifth place, just missing the playoffs, with a record of 58–67 (.464).

The team became known as the Clarksville Colts in 1947. They accumulated a record of 40–83 (.325), placing last of eight teams. The Colts posted two more losing seasons in 1948 (49–77; .389) and 1949 (40–85; .320), placing sixth and seventh respectively. Clarksville lost their last two games, 7–3 and 6–1, in a doubleheader with Hopkinsville on September 5, 1949. Over four seasons, the team had accumulated a record of 187–312 (.375).

Clarksville did not field another professional team until 1996 with the Clarksville Coyotes of the independent Big South League.

== Season-by-season results ==
Season	Regular season				Postseason			Ref.
Season	Record	Win %	Finish	GB	Record	Win %	Result	Ref.
1946	58–67	.464	5th	26 1/2	—	—	Result	—
1947	40–83	.325	8th	36	—	—	—	
1948	49–77	.389	6th	36	—	—	—	
1949	40–85	.320	7th	43 1/2	—	—	—	
Totals	187–312	.375	—	—	—	—	—	—

== Notable players ==
Three players also played in at league one game in Major League Baseball during their careers. These players and their seasons with Clarksville were:

- Harley Boss (1946)
- Johnny Gill (1947)
- Hod Lisenbee (1946–1949)
