= Springfield Blanket Makers =

- 1923; Springfield, Tennessee

Minor league affiliations
- Class: Class D
- League: Kentucky–Illinois–Tennessee League

Major league affiliations
- Team: Unaffiliated

Minor league titles
- League titles (0): None

Team data
- Name: Springfield Blanket Makers
- Ballpark: Unknown

The Springfield Blanket Makers were a Minor League Baseball team that played in the Class D Kentucky–Illinois–Tennessee League (KITTY League) in 1923. They were located in Springfield, Tennessee.

After their scheduled May 15 season opener was rained out, Springfield lost the next day's game to the Hopkinsville Hoppers, 7–2. They closed out the first half with an 8–7 home loss to the Mayfield Pantsmakers on July 7. They finished last of eight teams with a 14–36 (.280) record.

On July 9, just before the start of the second half, Springfield surrendered its franchise to the league due to poor finances and an inability to raise funds. The league hoped to place the team in another Tennessee city, either Clarksville, Jackson, or Milan. On July 19, ten games into the second half, the franchise was taken over by Milan and nearby Trenton as the Milan-Trenton Twins. At the end of the second half, the Twins placed fifth with a record of 21–22 (.488).
