= Milan-Trenton Twins =

- 1923; Milan and Trenton, Tennessee

Minor league affiliations
- Class: Class D
- League: Kentucky–Illinois–Tennessee League

Major league affiliations
- Team: Unaffiliated

Minor league titles
- League titles (0): None

Team data
- Name: Milan-Trenton Twins
- Ballpark: Milan City Park (Milan); Unknown (Trenton)

The Milan-Trenton Twins were a Minor League Baseball team that played in the Class D Kentucky–Illinois–Tennessee League (KITTY League) in 1923. The team was shared between the cities of Milan and Trenton, Tennessee. Thus, the Twins were named for their twin cities. Home games were alternated between Milan City Park and an unknown ballpark in Trenton.

In 1922, Trenton was home to the Trenton Reds of the KITTY League, but the city fielded no team at the start of the 1923 season. The KITTY League's Springfield Blanket Makers of Springfield, Tennessee, dropped out of the league at the start of that season's second half. The franchise was subsequently taken over by Milan and Trenton as the Milan-Trenton Twins.

The Twins began competition on July 19, approximately 10 games into the second half, with a 10–0 road loss to the Paris Parisians. They won their first game on July 25, defeating the Hopkinsville Hoppers, 3–1, at Milan. The season ended on September 3, with the Twins losing the morning game of a doubleheader to Hopkinsville, 6–0, and the afternoon game being called due to rain after six scoreless innings. The Twins placed fifth out of eight teams at 21–22 (.488).
