= Madisonville Miners =

- 1896–1955; (1896, 1916, 1922, 1946–1955); Madisonville, Kentucky

Minor league affiliations
- Class: Independent (1896); Class D (1916, 1922, 1946–1955)
- League: Kentucky-Indiana League (1896); Pennyrile League (1896); Kentucky–Illinois–Tennessee League (1916, 1922, 1946–1955)

Major league affiliations
- Team: Chicago White Sox (1946–1955)

Minor league titles
- League titles (2): 1949; 1952
- Conference titles (1): 1922
- Wild card berths (3): 1947; 1948; 1953

Team data
- Name: Madisonville (1896); Madisonville Miners (1916, 1922, 1946–1955)
- Ballpark: Madisonville City Park (1916, 1922, 1946–1955)

The Madisonville Miners were a minor league baseball team based in Madisonville, Kentucky. Madisonville played in various seasons between 1896 and 1955. The Madisonville Miners teams played as members of the Class D level Kentucky–Illinois–Tennessee League. In 1896, the Madisonville team played as members of both the Kentucky-Indiana League and Pennyrile League.

The Madisonville Miners were a minor league affiliate of the Chicago White Sox from 1946 to 1955.

The Miners hosted home minor league games at the Madisonville City Park ballpark.

Today, the Madisonville "Miners" moniker has been revived, as Madisonville hosts the summer collegiate baseball team of the same name.

== History ==
=== 1896, 1916, 1922 ===
Minor league baseball began in Madisonville, Kentucky in 1896. That season, the Madisonville team played as members of two leagues. The team was a member of the six–team Kentucky-Indiana League and four–team Pennyrile League. League records in both Independent level leagues are unknown.

Minor league baseball resumed in Madisonville, Kentucky in 1916. The Madisonville "Miners" became members of the eight–team Class D level Kentucky–Illinois–Tennessee League, known informally as the KITTY League. On August 2, 1916, the Madisonville Miners disbanded. The Miners finished the 1916 season with a 31–41 record and in fifth place in the standings, playing the season under managers Artie Cummings and Leo Angemeier. The league folded on August 4, 1916, with Madisonville 18.0 games behind the first place Clarksville Volunteers in the final standings. After the league folded on August 4, 1916, it did not return to play until the 1922 season.

The use of the "Miners" moniker corresponds with the mining industry and history in the Madisonville region. Today, Coal mining continues to be a major local industry in the Madisonville area.

The 1922 Madisonville Miners returned to minor league play as the Kentucky-Illinois-Tennessee League reformed. The 1922 season saw the Miners team involved in controversy. The Class D level Kentucky–Illinois–Tennessee League began league play on May 16, 1922. Madisonville finished the 1922 season with a 73–39 record to place first in the overall standings, playing under manager Neil Deighan. However, the Madisonville franchise was disqualified from winning the second half title for using an ineligible player. The second place Cairo Egyptians were also disqualified for salary limit violations. The second half title was awarded to the Paris Travelers and Madisonville was banned from the playoffs, eventually won by the Mayfield Pantsmakers over Paris. The Madisonville Miners finished 11½ games ahead of the second place Hopkinsville Hoppers in the final overall standings. Madisonville pitchers Ed Holley led the league with 22 wins, Raymond Donovan led with 141 strikeouts and Perry Payne led in ERA at 2.40. Madisonville folded after the 1922 season and did not return to the league in 1923.

=== Kentucky–Illinois–Tennessee League 1946 to 1955 ===
After a league hiatus due to World War II, the 1946 Madisonville Miners returned as members of the Class D level Kentucky–Illinois–Tennessee League, becoming a minor league affiliate of the Chicago White Sox. Madisonville would remain a White Sox' affiliate through their final season of play. In their return to play, the 1946 Miners finished in sixth place with a record of 53–71. Led by manager Frank Zubik, the Miners finished 31.0 games behind the first place Owensboro Oilers in the eight–team league's final standings.

The 1947 Madisonville Miners continued play as a member of the Class D level Kentucky–Illinois–Tennessee League and reached the league finals. The Miners finished the regular season with a 69–56 record to place fourth under returning manager Frank Zubik. Madisonville finished 8.0 games behind the first place Owensboro Oilers in the final regular season standings. In the playoffs, the Madisonville Miners defeated the Mayfield Clothiers 3 games to 1 to advance. In the Finals, the Hopkinsville Hoppers defeated Madisonville 4 games to 1.

The Madisonville Miners again reached the Finals in the 1948 Kentucky–Illinois–Tennessee League. With a regular season record of 67–55, Madisonville placed fourth, playing the season under managers George Mathauser, Conrad Juelke and Robert Balance. The Miners finished 16.0 games behind the first place Hopkinsville Hoppers in the final standings. In the playoffs, the Madisonville Miners defeated the Hopkinsville Hoppers 3 games to 2 to advance. In the Finals, the Union City Greyhounds swept the Miners in 4 games.

After losing in the Finals the previous two seasons, the 1949 Madisonville Miners won the Kentucky–Illinois–Tennessee League championship. The Miners finished the regular season with a 67–57 record, to again place fourth, playing under manager Joe DeMasi. Madisonville finished 16.0 games behind the first place Owensboro Oilers in the final regular season standings. In the 1949 Playoffs, the Madisonville Miners swept the Owensboro Oilers in three games. In the Finals, the Miners were up 2 games to 1 over the Cairo Dodgers when the series was ended due to bad weather.

The Madisonville Miners placed fifth in the 1950 Kentucky–Illinois–Tennessee League standings. Madisonville compiled a 63–51 record under managers George Mitro and Skeeter Webb. The Miners finished 8.0 games behind the first place Mayfiled Clothiers in the regular season standings and missed the playoffs.

The 1951 Kentucky–Illinois–Tennessee League play saw the Madisonville Miners finish in seventh place in the eight-team league. With a 46–73 record under manager Burl Storie, Madisonville missed the playoffs. The Miners finished 27.0 games behind the first place Fulton Railroaders in the final standings.

The Madisonville Miners won the 1952 Kentucky–Illinois–Tennessee League championship. Madisonville finished the regular season with a 65–55 record to place third, finishing 17½ games behind the first place Fulton Lookouts Under manager Everett Robinson, the Madisonville Miners defeated the Paducah Chiefs 3 games to 1 in the first playoff series to advance. In the Finals, the Miners swept the Union City Greyhounds in 3 games to win the championship.

The Miners placed second in the 1953 Kentucky–Illinois–Tennessee League and reached the playoffs. On July 18, 1953, pitcher William Johnson of Madisonville threw a no-hitter. Johnson defeated the Mayfield Clothiers 4–0. With a 67–53 record under returning manager Everett Robinson, the Miners finished 3.0 games behind the Fulton Lookouts in the eight–team league. In the playoffs, the Paducah Chiefs defeated Madisonville 2 games to 0.

In 1954, the Madisonville Miners lost in the Kentucky–Illinois–Tennessee League Finals. With a record of 61–52, the Miners placed fifth in the overall league standings, playing the season under managers Bob Latshaw and William Close. The Miners finished 13½ games behind the first place Union City Dodgers in the eight–team league. Madisonville reached the playoffs in a split–season format. In the finals, the Union City Dodgers defeated Madisonville 4 games to 2.

In their final season of minor league play, the 1955 Madisonville Miners folded during the Kentucky–Illinois–Tennessee League season. The league itself reduced to six teams in 1955 and permanently folded following the 1955 season. On June 7, 1955, Madisonville pitcher Jack Kralick threw a no-hitter against the Union City Dodgers in a Kentucky–Illinois–Tennessee League game. Madisonville defeated Union City 1–0. On July 7, 1955, the Madisonville Miners had a 23–37 record when the franchise disbanded. The manager was William Close.

Following the 1955 season, Madisonville, Kentucky has not hosted another minor league team.

=== Today ===
In 2012, the "Madisonville Miners" moniker was revived by a summer collegiate baseball team, hosted in Madisonville. The franchise is a member of the Ohio Valley League, playing at Elmer Kelley Stadium within the Madisonville City Park.

== The ballpark ==
The Madisonville Miners played home minor league home games at Madisonville City Park. The ballpark was within the confines of the 200 acre City Park and was known as initially Municipal Park Stadium. Still in use today, the ballpark became known as "Elmer Kelley Stadium," in 1976 and was built in 1941 as a WPA project. Kelley, who died at the age of 55 in 1973, was the former sports editor and advertising manager of the Madisonville Messenger newspaper. Still in use today as a public park, the park itself features a golf course, municipal swimming pool, lakes and other amenities. The ballpark hosts the collegiate summer baseball Madisonville Miners team and North Hopkins High School teams and underwent improvements in 2017.

== Timeline ==
Year(s)	# Yrs.	Team	Level	League	Affiliate	Ballpark
1896 (1)	1	Madisonville	Independent	Kentucky-Indiana League	None	Unknown
1896 (2)	1	Madisonville	Independent	Pennyrile League	None	Unknown
1916, 1922	2	Madisonville Miners	Class D	Kentucky–Illinois–Tennessee League	None	Madisonville City Park
1946–1955	10	Madisonville Miners	Class D	Kentucky–Illinois–Tennessee League	Chicago White Sox	Madisonville City Park

== Year-by-year records ==
Year	Record	Finish	Manager	Playoffs
1916	31–41	5th	Artie Cummings / Leo Angemeier	Team folded August 2
1922	73–39	1st	Neil Deighan	Title stripped from the team
1946	53–71	6th	Frank Zubik	Did not qualify
1947	69–56	4th	Frank Zubik	Lost League Finals
1948	67–55	4th	George Mathauser / Conrad Juelke / Robert Balance	Lost League Finals
1949	67–57	4th	Joe DeMasi	League champions
1950	63–51	5th	George Mitro / Skeeter Webb	Did not qualify
1951	46–73	7th	Burl Storie	Did not qualify
1952	65–55	3rd	Everett Robinson	League champions
1953	67–53	2nd	Everett Robinson	Lost in 1st round
1954	61–52	5th	Bob Latshaw / William Close	Lost in League Finals
1955	23–37	NA	William Close	Team folded July 7

== Notable alumni ==
- Herb Adams (1947)
- Rudy Árias (1953)
- Clyde Berry (1953)
- Mike Blyzka (1947)
- Bob Buhl (1947) 2x MLB All-Star
- Tom Flanigan (1952)
- Joe Hicks (1953)
- Ed Holley (1922)
- Jim Hughes (1946)
- Jack Kralick (1955)
- Bob Latshaw (1954, MGR)
- Everett Robinson (1952–1953, MGR)
- Skeeter Webb (1950, MGR)

== See also ==
- Madisonville Miners players
