= Jackson Jays =

- 1924–1926; Jackson, Tennessee

Minor league affiliations
- Class: Class D (1924–1926)
- League: Tri-State League (1925–1926); Kentucky–Illinois–Tennessee League (1924)

Major league affiliations
- Team: Unaffiliated (1924–1926)

Minor league titles
- League titles (0): None

Team data
- Name: Jackson Jays (1926); Jackson Giants (1925); Jackson Blue Jays (1924)
- Ballpark: Athletic Park (1924–1926)

The Jackson Jays were a Minor League Baseball team that played in Jackson, Tennessee, from 1924 to 1926. They competed in the Class D Kentucky–Illinois–Tennessee League (KITTY League) in 1924 as the Jackson Blue Jays. They moved to the Class D Tri-State League as the Jackson Giants in 1925 and became the Jackson Jays in 1926. Their home games were played at Athletic Park. Over three years of competition, they accumulated a 118–154 (.434) record.

== History ==
Professional baseball was first played in Jackson, Tennessee, in 1903 by the Jackson Railroaders of the Kentucky–Illinois–Tennessee League. They were followed in the KITTY League by the Jackson Climbers in 1911.

The Jackson Blue Jays joined the KITTY League in 1924. They played their first game on May 13, losing to the Dyersburg Forked Deers, 2–0, before a home audience of 2,500 people at Athletic Park. They earned their first win the next afternoon, defeating Dyersburg, 5–4. The Blue Jays compiled a first season record of 51–61 (.455) and did not win either half of the league's split season.

The KITTY League failed to reorganize for the 1925 season, so Jackson joined the Class D Tri-State League. They also changed their name to the Jackson Giants. The Giants posted a season record of 40–63 (.388). The team changed its name to the Jackson Jays in 1926 as they continued in the Tri-State League. The circuit disbanded due to poor attendance after the games of July 5, the scheduled end of the first half. The Jays lost their final game to the Sheffield-Tuscumbia Twins, 7–6 in 14 innings. Their final record was 27–30 (.474). Over all three years of competition, Jackson accumulated a 118–154 (.434) record.

The city did not field another team until the Jackson Generals joined a revival of the KITTY League in 1935.

== Season-by-season results ==
Season	Regular season				Postseason			Ref.
Season	Record	Win %	Finish	GB	Record	Win %	Result	Ref.
1924	51–61	.455	5th	11	—	—	Result	—
1925	40–63	.388	5th	25 1/2	—	—	—	
1926	27–30	.474	4th	7 1/2	—	—	—	
Totals	118–154	.434	—	—	—	—	—	—

== Notable players ==
The only Giant to also play in Major League Baseball was Ben Cantwell of the 1925 team, who made his major league debut in 1927 with the New York Giants—the start of an 11-year major league career.
