= Lee Moody =

American baseball player

- First baseman
- Born: May 14, 1917; East St. Louis, Illinois, U.S.
- Died: July 4, 1998 (aged 81); Ferguson, Missouri, U.S.
- Batted: Right Threw: Right

Negro league baseball debut
- 1944, for the Kansas City Monarchs

Last appearance
- 1947, for the Birmingham Black Barons

Teams
- Minor Leagues/Independent: Kansas City Stars (1948); Cairo Dodgers (1950); Trois-Rivieres Royals (1951); Negro Major Leagues: Kansas City Monarchs (1944–1947, 1949-1950); Birmingham Black Barons (1946–1947)

Leicester Moody (May 14, 1917 – July 4, 1998) was an American Negro league first baseman in the 1940s.

== Playing career ==
=== Kansas City Monarchs ===
==== 1944 ====
Lee Moody first broke into the Negro Leagues in 1944 with the Kansas City Monarchs as an outfielder, hitting .267 in 106 league at bats.

==== 1945 ====
When the Monarchs' regular first baseman Buck O'Neil left the team to serve in the United States Navy during World War II, Moody was quickly moved to first base. Moody appeared in 42 league games at his new position, hitting .331 with a .411 slugging percentage. Hitting aside, he attracted attention for his strong defensive play in the infield, teaming up with rookie Jackie Robinson.

==== 1946 ====
Moody began the season in Kansas City, primarily as a backup middle infielder before moving to the Birmingham Black Barons.

==== 1947 ====
The Monarchs brought Moody back again to battle with Chico Renfroe for the starting shortstop job. He made only three appearances in a Monarchs uniform before moving to Birmingham again.

==== 1948-1950 ====
Moody returned to the Monarchs in 1948, joining them on a barnstorming tours but not appearing in any recorded league games. In addition to barnstorming with the Monarchs, he was a member of the Kansas City Stars, a farm club of the Monarchs managed by Cool Papa Bell.

=== Birmingham Black Barons ===
==== 1946 ====
Moody was acquired by the Black Barons midway through the 1946 season for additional depth in left field. He hit just .182 with Birmingham, though combined with his time on the Monarchs earlier in the season Moody is credited with a total .375 batting average in recorded league play.

==== 1947 ====
Following another brief trial with the Monarchs in early 1947, Moody joined the Black Barons for a second stint. In his last recorded season at the top level of the Negro Leagues, Moody hit .224 as the club's starting first baseman.

=== California Winter League ===
In 1946 Moody participated in the integrated California Winter League as a member of Chet Brewer's Kansas City Royals.

=== Minor Leagues ===
==== Cairo Dodgers ====
In 1950, Moody played for the Class D Cairo Dodgers of the Kentucky-Illinois-Tennessee League, hitting .279 in 38 games.

==== Trois-Rivieres Royals ====
Now 34 years old, Moody moved up to Class C in 1951, hitting .242 in 60 games with the Trois-Rivieres Royals. Moody retired from baseball following the 1951 campaign.

== Death and legacy ==
Lee Moody died in Ferguson, Missouri in 1998 at age 81. He was inducted into the St. Louis Amateur Baseball Hall of Fame in 1993.
