= Union City Dodgers =

- 1935–1955; (1935–1942, 1946–1955); Union City, Tennessee

Minor league affiliations
- Class: Class D (1935–1942, 1946–1955)
- League: Kentucky–Illinois–Tennessee League (1935–1942, 1946–1955)

Major league affiliations
- Team: Brooklyn Dodgers (1953–1955); Cleveland Indians (1947–1949); St. Louis Cardinals (1939–1942); Cincinnati Reds (1938); St. Louis Cardinals (1936–1937)

Minor league titles
- League titles (3): 1936; 1948; 1954
- First-half titles (1): 1954
- Second-half titles (1): 1936

Team data
- Name: Union City Dodgers (1953–1955); Union City Greyhounds (1935–1942, 1946–1952)
- Ballpark: Turner Memorial Field (1935–1942, 1946–1955)

The Union City Dodgers were a Minor League Baseball team that played in the Class D Kentucky–Illinois–Tennessee League (KITTY League) from 1935 to 1942 and 1946 to 1955. They were located in Union City, Tennessee, and played their home games at Turner Memorial Field. Originally known as the Union City Greyhounds, the team had affiliations with the St. Louis Cardinals, Cincinnati Reds, and Cleveland Indians. They changed their name to the Union City Dodgers upon becoming a Brooklyn Dodgers affiliate in 1953.

Over 19 seasons of competition, Union City played in 2,106 regular season games and compiled an all-time win–loss record of 1,002–1,104. They won three KITTY League championships (1936, 1948, and 1954) and had a postseason record of 15–12.

== History ==
=== First run (1935–1942) ===
The Union City Greyhounds became members of the Kentucky–Illinois–Tennessee League in 1935. Their home games were played at Turner Memorial Field in Union City, Tennessee. They lost their inaugural Opening Day game on May 22 to the Portageville Pirates, 3–2, on the road. The Greyhounds got their first win two games later on May 24, defeating the Pirates, 4–2. They ended their first season in second place with a 49–43 (.533) record but missed the playoffs having not won either half the league's split season.

In 1936, the Greyhounds became an affiliate of the St. Louis Cardinals. They succeeded in winning the second half and posting a full-season record of 73–45 (.619), tied with the Paducah Indians for first place. They then met the first-half champion Indians in the playoffs. After Union City won the first game, 6–2, on September 15, Paducah refused to continue the series, claiming the Greyhounds had two ineligible players on their roster. The championship was subsequently awarded to Union City, and Paducah's manager and seven players who refused to play were banned from professional baseball.

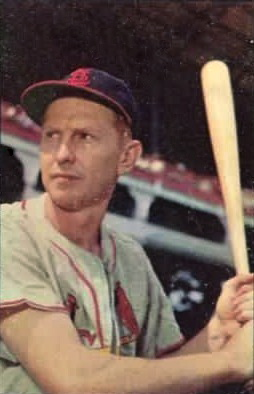
Red Schoendienst of the 1942 Greyhounds was inducted in National Baseball Hall of Fame in 1989.

Finishing the 1937 season in first place at 73–46 (.613), Union City again qualified for the playoffs, but they were eliminated in the semifinals, 3–0, by the Mayfield Clothiers. Union City left the St. Louis organization after 1937 and became an affiliate of the Cincinnati Reds in 1938. In contrast to the previous campaign, the 1938 team finished last of eight teams at 45–85 (.346).

They returned to the Cardinals organization in 1939, but the team again placed last with a record of 44–82 (.349). Slightly improved teams placed sixth at 60–65 (.480) in 1940 and fifth at 62–64 (.492) in 1941. Having lost some US$3,500 due to low attendance brought on by poor play, Union City announced it would drop out of the KITTY League after their game on June 19, 1942. The Bowling Green Barons were also forced to withdraw, and the remaining clubs voted to discontinue the circuit on June 19. The Greyhounds decided against playing their final game after receiving word from St. Louis that their players would not be compensated for the game. The club was last of six teams with a 9–35 (.205) record in the abandoned season. Over eight seasons of competition, the Greyhounds accumulated a regular season record of 415–495 (.456).

=== Second run (1946–1955) ===
The KITTY League was nonoperational from 1943 to 1945 during World War II. It and the Greyhounds were revived in 1946. With no major league affiliation, Union City opened the 1946 season on May 7 with a 7–3 loss to the Fulton Chicks before a home crowd of 1,230 people at Turner Memorial Field. At the end of the season, the team was seventh out of eight teams at 52–72 (.419).

The Greyhounds entered into an affiliation with the Cleveland Indians in 1947. The team placed seventh at 51–74 (.408). The 1948 team, managed by ex-major leaguer Tony Rensa finished second with a 79–46 (.632) record, qualifying for one of four playoff spots. They defeated the Owensboro Oilers, 3–2, in the semifinals before sweeping the Madisonville Miners in four games to win their second KITTY League championship. The 1949 club just missed the postseason with a 65–60 (.520) record, placing fifth.

Union City severed its ties with Cleveland after the 1949 season and had no affiliation in 1950. They placed seventh at 43–72 (.374) in 1950 and sixth at 43–72 (.374) in 1951. The 1952 Greyhounds qualified for the playoffs with a fourth-place 63–56 (.529) record. They won the semifinals over the Fulton Lookouts, 3–2, but fell in the championship finals to Madisonville, 3–0.

In 1953, the team became an affiliate of the Brooklyn Dodgers and changed their name to the Union City Dodgers. After placing last (51–69; .425) in their first season with Brooklyn, the 1954 Dodgers won the first half title and paced the league with a 76–40 (.655) record. Under manager Earl Naylor, they defeated Madisonville, 4–2, to win a third KITTY League championship.

The Dodgers played their final game on August 29, 1955, losing to the Mayfield Clothiers, 6–3, in a game that was called after seven innings due to rain. They posted a season record of 50–57 (.467), placing fourth out of six teams. The KITTY League did not reform for the 1956 season, and Union City did not field another professional team afterwards. Over their second stretch of 10 years, the Greyhounds/Dodgers accumulated a 587–609 (.491) record. Over all 19 seasons, Union City's all-time record was 1,002–1–104 (.476).

== Ballpark ==
Union City played their home games at Turner Memorial Field. The ballpark, which was demolished in 1969, was located on West Main Street next to the old armory building on the north side of West Main and adjacent to the intersection of West Main and South Fifth Street. The field faced northeast with dimensions of 318 feet (97 m) along the left-field line and 312 feet (95 m) along the right-field line. The center-field fence was originally 512 feet (156 m) from home plate, but it was moved in to a distance of 409 feet (125 m) in 1940.

== Season-by-season results ==
Season	Regular season				Postseason			MLB affiliate	Ref.
Season	Record	Win %	Finish	GB	Record	Win %	Result	MLB affiliate	Ref.
1935	49–43	.533	2nd	1	—	—	Result	—	—
1936	73–75	.619	1st (tie)	—	1–0	1.000	Won Second Half title Won KITTY League championship vs. Paducah Indians, 1–0	St. Louis Cardinals	
1937	73–46	.613	1st	—	0–3	.000	Lost semifinals vs. Mayfield Clothiers, 3–0	St. Louis Cardinals	
1938	45–85	.346	8th	31	—	—	—	Cincinnati Reds	
1939	44–82	.349	8th	32 1/2	—	—	—	St. Louis Cardinals	
1940	60–65	.480	6th	15	—	—	—	St. Louis Cardinals	
1941	62–64	.492	5th	21 1/2	—	—	—	St. Louis Cardinals	
1942	9–35	.205	6th	21	—	—	—	St. Louis Cardinals	
1946	52–72	.419	7th	32	—	—	—	—	
1947	51–74	.408	7th	26	—	—	—	Cleveland Indians	
1948	79–46	.632	2nd	5 1/2	7–2	.778	Won semifinals vs. Owensboro Oilers, 3–2; Won KITTY League championship vs. Madisonville Miners, 4–0	Cleveland Indians	
1949	65–60	.520	5th	18 1/2	—	—	—	Cleveland Indians	
1950	43–72	.374	7th	28 1/2	—	—	—	—	
1951	57–63	.475	6th	16 1/2	—	—	—	—	
1952	63–56	.529	4th	19	3–5	.375	Won semifinals vs. Fulton Lookouts, 3–2; Lost KITTY League championship vs. Madisonville Miners, 3–0	—	
1953	51–69	.425	7th	19	—	—	—	Brooklyn Dodgers	
1954	76–40	.655	1st	—	4–2	.667	Won First Half title Won KITTY League championship vs. Madisonville Miners, 4–2	Brooklyn Dodgers	
1955	50–57	.467	4th	16	—	—	—	Brooklyn Dodgers	
Totals	1,002–1–104	.476	—	—	15–12	.556	—	—	—

== Notable players ==
Eighteen Union City players also played in at least one game in Major League Baseball during their careers. These players and their seasons with Union City were:

- John Antonelli (1937)
- Dave Bartosch (1937)
- Glenn Crawford (1939)
- Johnny Gill (1946)|
- Cal Howe (1942)
- Al Lakeman (1938)
- Red Lutz (1938)
- Fred Martin (1936)
- Heinie Mueller (1936)
- Ed Murphy (1937)
- Earl Naylor (1953–54)
- Jackie Price (1935)
- Tony Rensa (1948–49)
- Red Schoendienst (1942)
- Chuck Templeton (1954)
- Elam Vangilder (1936)
- Rudy York (1949)
- Russ Young (1935)
