= Paris Parisians =

Paris Parisians could refer to

- Paris Parisians (Eastern Illinois League), a minor league baseball team from Paris, Illinois, that played in 1907 as the Paris Colts and in 1908 as the Paris Parisians
- Paris Parisians (KITTY League), a minor league baseball team from Paris, Tennessee, that played from 1923 to 1924
- Citizens of Paris, France

== See also ==
- Paris Paris, a 2023 Indian Tamil-language comedy film by Ramesh Aravind
