= Princeton Infants =

- 1905; Princeton, Kentucky

Minor league affiliations
- Class: Class D (1905–1908)
- League: Kentucky–Illinois–Tennessee League (1905)

Major league affiliations
- Team: None

Minor league titles
- League titles (0): None

Team data
- Name: Princeton Infants (1905)
- Ballpark: League Park (1905)

The Princeton Infants were a minor league baseball team based in Princeton, Kentucky. In 1905, Princeton played as members of the Kentucky–Illinois–Tennessee League. Hosting minor league home games at League Park, the Infants' 1905 season was cut short by the Yellow fever epidemic.

== History ==
The Princeton Infants began minor league play in 1905, when Princeton became members of the six–team 1905 Kentucky–Illinois–Tennessee League, nicknamed as the KITTY League. Princeton was joined by the Cairo Giants, Henderson Hens, Hopkinsville Browns, Paducah Indians and Vincennes Alices teams in the Class D level league.

The Princeton use of the "Infants" moniker corresponds with new or young rostered teams being called the "Infants" or "Lambs" during the era.

Beginning league play on May 4, 1905, the Princeton Infants finished in fourth place with a 46–61 record, playing their season under managers R. Meredeth and John Ray. During the season, the Henderson and Hopkinsville franchises both disbanded on July 18, 1905, reducing the league to four teams. On August 17, 1905, the Kentucky–Illinois–Tennessee League season was ended early, with National Association permission, due to the Yellow fever epidemic. The Infants finished 24.0 games behind the first place Paducah Indians (68–35) in the final standings. The Vincennes Alices (65–41) and Cairo Giants (46–57) finished ahead of Princeton in the standings. Princeton was followed by the Hopkinsville Browns (31–44) and Henderson Hens (29–47).

On June 27, 1905, at League Park in Princeton, the Princeton Infants and Hopkinsville played a 21–inning game. In front of 200 fans, Hopkinsville won the game 4–2. The game took 3:10 to play and ended at 6:10PM.

The Princeton franchise permanently folded following the 1905 season. Princeton, Kentucky has not hosted another minor league team.

== The ballpark ==
The 1905 Princeton Infants hosted minor league home games at League Park.

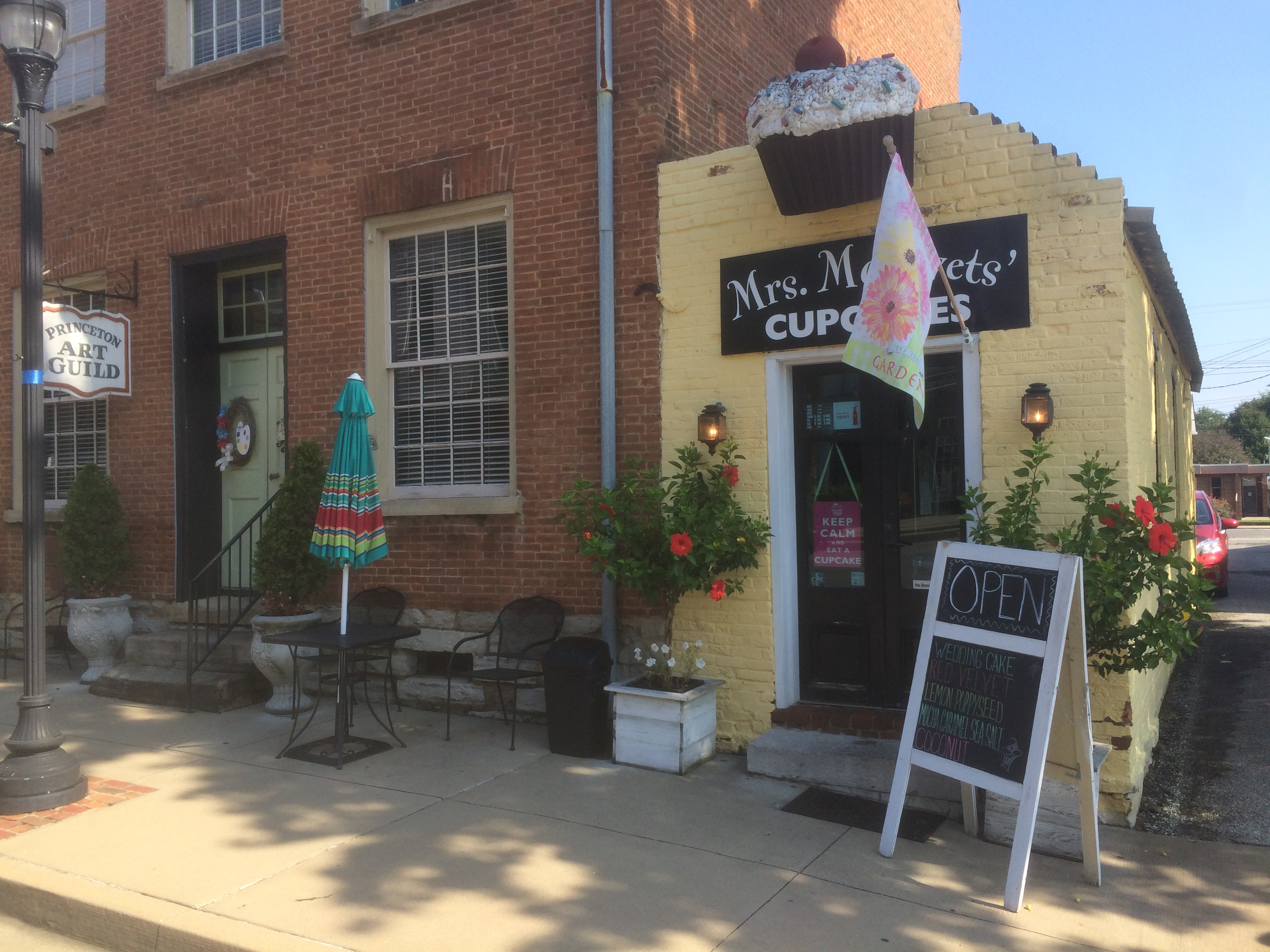
(2016) Downtown. Princeton, Kentucky

== Year-by-year record ==
Year	Record	Finish	Manager	Playoffs/Notes
1905	46–61	4th	R. Meredeth / John Ray	League ended season August 17

== Notable alumni ==
- No players on the 1905 Princeton roster played in the major leagues.
