= Jackson Railroaders =

- 1903; Jackson, Tennessee

Minor league affiliations
- Class: Class D
- League: Kentucky–Illinois–Tennessee League

Major league affiliations
- Team: Unaffiliated

Minor league titles
- League titles (0): None

Team data
- Ballpark: Lakeview Ball Park

The Jackson Railroaders were a Minor League Baseball team that played in the Class D Kentucky–Illinois–Tennessee League in 1903. They were located in Jackson, Tennessee, and were named for the city's association with the railroad industry, which was an important part of the city's economy; Jackson was also the home of locomotive engineer Casey Jones. The Railroaders played their home games at Lakeview Ball Park.

Playing on the road, Jackson lost their season opener on May 21 against the Cairo Egyptians, 9–8. They ended the season on the road with an 11–2 loss to the Hopkinsville Hoppers on September 16. The Railroaders compiled a win–loss record of 53–52 (.505), placing third, in their only season of competition.

The next professional baseball team to hail from Jackson was the Jackson Climbers in 1911.
