= J. Polk Brooks Stadium =

Baseball stadium in Paducah, Kentucky, US

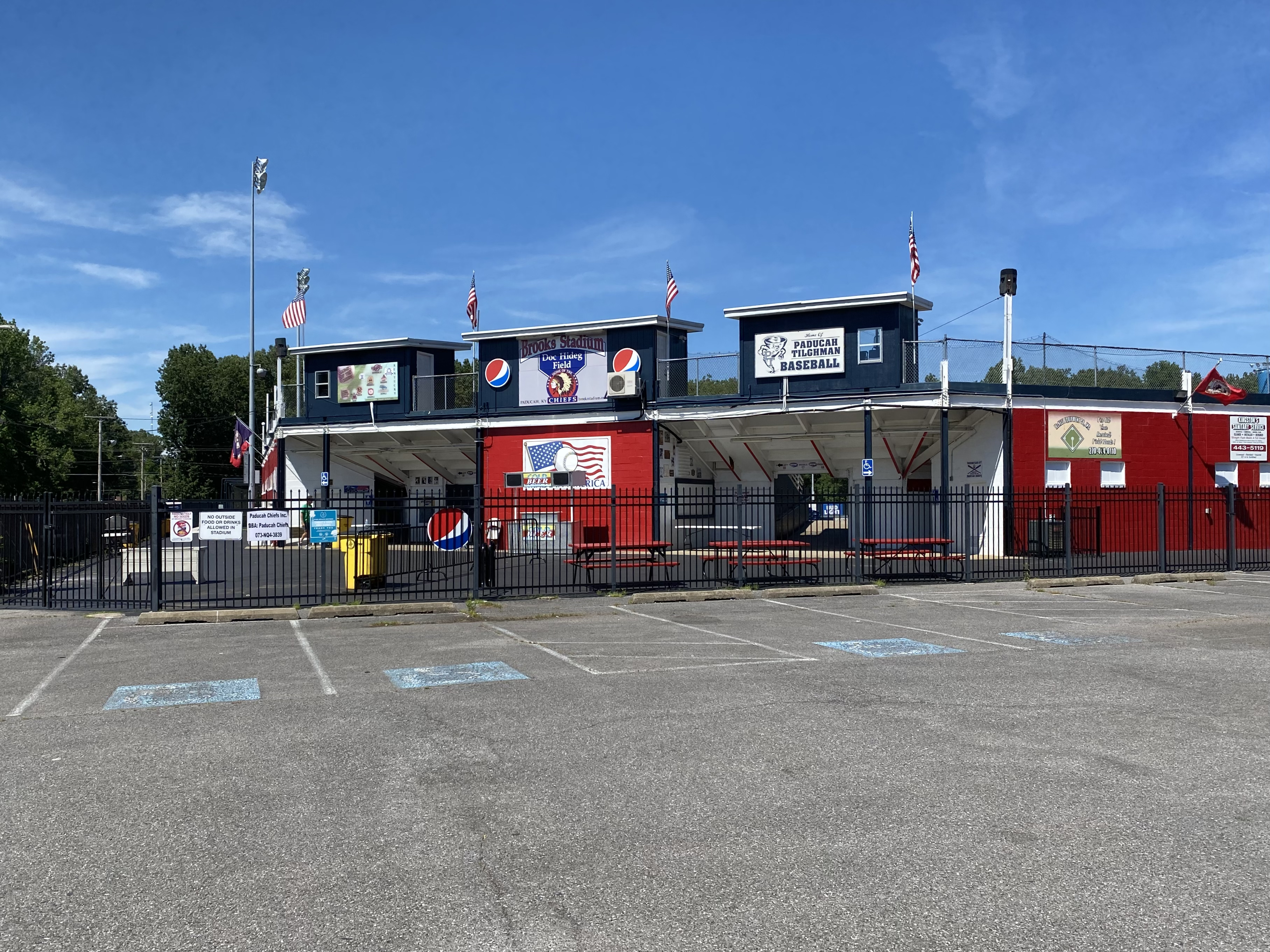

- Location within Kentucky Location within the United States
- Address: 2400 Brooks Stadium Drive, Paducah, KY 42001
- Location: Paducah, Kentucky
- Coordinates: 37.068307°N 88.617849°W
- Owner: City of Paducah
- Operator: Brooks Stadium Commission
- Capacity: 3,000
- Surface: grass
- Field size: Left field: 330 ft (100 m); Center field: 400 ft (120 m); Right field: 330 ft (100 m)

Construction
- Groundbreaking: May 1948
- Opened: May 8, 1949
- Cost: $75,000 (1948–1949)

Tenants
- Paducah Chiefs (1949–1955); Paducah Chiefs (2006–present); Paducah Tilghman Blue Tornado

Website
- paducahky.gov/departments/parks-recreation/brooks-stadium-and-park

J. Polk Brooks Stadium is a baseball stadium in Paducah, Kentucky. It is the home of the Paducah Chiefs. It is also used by college baseball, high school baseball (including the home field for nearby Paducah Tilghman High School), American Legion Baseball, and other amateur teams. It was built in 1948 and 1949 for the original Paducah Chiefs, who folded in 1955. The community kept the ballpark up over the years using it for amateur baseball, before the Chiefs were reorganized in 2016 in the Ohio Valley Summer Collegiate Baseball League.

The park was named for J. Polk Brooks, a local bus line operator, who was the president of the Paducah Baseball Association. He was the person who singlehandedly got the stadium built, even if it meant doing the manual labor himself.
