= Clarksville Volunteers =

- 1910–1916; (1910–1914, 1916); Clarksville, Tennessee

Minor league affiliations
- Class: Class D (1910–1914, 1916)
- League: Kentucky–Illinois–Tennessee League (1910–1914, 1916)

Major league affiliations
- Team: Unaffiliated (1910–1914, 1916)

Minor league titles
- League titles (0): None
- Pennants (1): 1912
- First-half titles (1): 1916

Team data
- Name: Clarksville Volunteers (1916); Clarksville Boosters (1913–1914); Clarksville Rebels (1912); Clarksville Billies (1911); Clarksville Volunteers (1910)
- Ballpark: League Park (1910–1914, 1916)

The Clarksville Volunteers were a Minor League Baseball team that played in the Class D Kentucky–Illinois–Tennessee League (KITTY League) from 1910 to 1915 and in 1916. They were located in Clarksville, Tennessee, and played their home games at League Park. The team operated under various names over their six-year run: the Volunteers in their first and last years (1910 and 1916), the Clarksville Billies (1911), Clarksville Rebels (1912), and Clarksville Boosters (1913–1914). They won the KITTY League pennant in 1912.

== History ==
Clarksville, Tennessee, had been previously represented in the Kentucky–Illinois–Tennessee League by the Clarksville Villagers in 1903 and the Clarksville Grays in 1904. The city returned to professional baseball and the KITTY League in 1910 with the Clarksville Volunteers, which played at League Park.

The Volunteers lost their 1910 season opener on the road to the Vincennes Alices, 2–0, on May 26. They won their first game on May 28 at Vincennes, 2–1. Clarksville's pitchers tossed three no-hitters in 1910. The first occurred on August 6, when Monte Prieste no-hit Vincennes in a 2–1 home win in the first game of a seven-inning doubleheader. Prieste pitched a second no-hitter on September 5 on the road against Vincennes in the second game of a doubleheader, winning 3–0 in seven innings. The third came again in the second game of doubleheader on September 20 when Ewing Harris tossed five no-hit innings at home against the McLeansboro Miners. The game was called so the Miners could catch their train. The Volunteers finished the season in second place with a 55–60 (.478) record but failed to win either half of the split season and qualify for the playoffs.

The 1911 Clarksville team, known as the Billies, placed last of eight KITTY League teams at 51–71 (.418). On June 27 of that season, Applegate pitched a no-hitter against the Fulton Colonels. The 1912 Clarksville Rebels won the KITTY League pennant with a first-place 68–29 (.701) record. The Rebels then met the Frankfort Lawmakers, champions of the Blue Grass League, in what was billed as the championship title of Class D. Frankfort won the series.

On September 5, 1913, Charles Humphrey tossed a seven-inning no-hitter in the second game of a doubleheader against the Hopkinsville Hoppers. The 1913 Volunteers narrowly missed the pennant with a second-place finish at 78–47 (.624), just one game behind the champion Paducah Chiefs. On July 4, 1914, Goldkamp no-hit Hopkinsville, 6–0. The Clarksville Boosters ended the season fifth out of six teams at 22–39 (.361). The KITTY League was nonoperational in 1915, but it and the Volunteers returned in 1916. Clarksville won the first half of the season. The Volunteers won both games of a doubleheader against Hopkinsville, 2–0 and 3–0, on August 7, the last day of play before the league folded. Clarksville posted a season record of 50–24 (.676). Over six years of competition, Clarksville's record was 324–270 (.545).

The city of Clarksville did not field another professional baseball team until the Clarksville Owls joined the KITTY League in 1946.

== Season-by-season results ==
Season	Regular season				Postseason			Ref.
Season	Record	Win %	Finish	GB	Record	Win %	Result	Ref.
1910	55–60	.478	2nd	7 1/2	—	—	Result	—
1911	51–71	.418	8th	26	—	—	—	
1912	68–29	.701	1st	—	—	—	Won KITTY League pennant	
1913	78–47	.624	2nd	1	—	—	—	
1914	22–39	.361	5th	24	—	—	—	
1916	50–24	.676	1st	—	—	—	Won first half title No playoffs held	
Totals	324–270	.545	—	—	—	—	—	—

== Notable players ==
Two players also played in at league one game in Major League Baseball during their careers. These players and their seasons with Clarksville were:

- Bill Keen (1910)
- Mark Stewart (1910)
