= Ernie Gust =

American baseball player (1888-1945)

- First baseman
- Born: January 24, 1888; Bay City, Michigan
- Died: October 26, 1945 (aged 57); Maupin, Oregon
- Batted: Right Threw: Right

MLB debut
- August 17, 1911, for the St. Louis Browns

Last MLB appearance
- August 19, 1911, for the St. Louis Browns

MLB statistics
- Games played: 3
- At bats: 12
- Hits: 0
- Stats at Baseball Reference

Teams
- St. Louis Browns (1911)

Ernest Herman Frank Gust (January 24, 1888 – October 26, 1945), nicknamed "Red", was an American Major League Baseball player. Gust played for the St. Louis Browns in the 1911 season. In three career games (August 17 – 19, 1911), each against the Washington Senators, Gust had no hits in 12 at-bats, playing first base. He batted and threw right-handed.

Gust received his opportunity to play for St Louis after batting .354 with 17 triples and a slugging percentage of .498 for the Harrisburg Miners/Jackson Climbers in the Class D Kentucky–Illinois–Tennessee League. Gust led the league in each of these categories among eligible batters. From 1913 to 1915, Gust played for Savannah in the Class C South Atlantic League, batting .302 in 1914.

In his first game for St. Louis, the Browns lost as Walter Johnson pitched a 5–0 shutout for Washington. His second game was much closer, but the Browns lost again, 3–2. His final game was an 8–7 loss. The Browns finished the 1911 season with the worst record in the American League (45–107), only a half game better than the Boston Rustlers of the National League (44–107). After his brief stint with St. Louis in 1911, Gust never played Major League Baseball again.

Gust was born in Bay City, Michigan, and died in Maupin, Oregon. He is buried in Elm Lawn Park Cemetery, in Bay City.
