= Bob Latshaw =

Robert Eugene Latshaw (February 23, 1917, in Denver, Colorado – January 16, 2001 in Towson, Maryland) was a long-time minor league baseball first baseman and manager who also played with the Baltimore Bullets in the American Basketball League in 1945.

Latshaw made his professional baseball debut in 1935 at the age of 18. He spent 20 seasons in the league, playing in 1,746 games. Although his exact career average is unknown he hit approximately .288; and though not a power hitter, Latshaw hit ten or more home runs six times and 15 or more three times, and 19 in one season.

He served as a player-manager from 1947 through 1954, or eight different seasons; but he managed through a full season only three times. He began with the Richmond Colts, finishing 68–71 and going to the playoffs, losing in the first round. He managed the Danville Leafs part of the year 1948, heading to the Wilson Tobs later that year. He managed the Galax Leafs in 1949, and in 1950 the Granby Red Sox.

Latshaw managed the Danville Leafs for the full season in 1951. He was the Augusta Tigers manager to start the 1952 season, but was replaced, and later that year managed the Leesburg Packers. He managed the Superior Blues for all of 1953, and led the Madisonville Miners for part of the year 1954.
