= Harrisburg Miners =

- 1910–1913; (1910–1911, 1913); Harrisburg, Illinois

Minor league affiliations
- Class: Class D (1910–1911, 1913)
- League: Kentucky–Illinois–Tennessee League (1910–1911, 1913); Southern Illinois League (1910)

Major league affiliations
- Team: Unaffiliated

Minor league titles
- League titles (0): None

Team data
- Name: Harrisburg Coal Miners (1913); Harrisburg Miners (1911); Harrisburg Merchants (1910)
- Ballpark: Unknown

The Harrisburg Miners was the primary moniker of the Minor League Baseball team that played in Harrisburg, Illinois, from 1910 to 1911 and 1913. They began the 1910 season as members of the Class D Southern Illinois League (SIL) as the Harrisburg Merchants. The league disbanded on July 11, and the Merchants moved to the Kentucky–Illinois–Tennessee League (KITTY League) on July 24. Their SIL record was 6–17 (.261). In the KITTY League, they went 29–29 (.500).

They continued in the KITTY League in 1911 as the Harrisburg Miners. The Miners won their season opener on the road against the McLeansboro Miners, 4–1, on May 17. On August 13, the league's directors voted to transfer the team to Jackson, Tennessee. The team's management claimed to have lost some US$1,700 due to poor attendance. Harrisburg won its last two games, 3–1 and 3–0, in a doubleheader on the road against the Fulton Colonels on August 12. The team's record in Harrisburg was 8–15 (.348). The franchise relocated to Jackson where it became the Jackson Climbers.

The Harrisburg Coal Miners returned to play in the 1913 KITTY League. The team finished 42–85 to place 7th in the eight–team league, playing under player/manager King Brockett. The Harrisburg franchise did not return to play in 1914, as the league reduced to six teams.

== Notable alumni ==
The only member of the Miners team to also play in Major League Baseball was Ernie Gust (1910–1911), who played three games with the St. Louis Browns in August 1911.

- Dallas Bradshaw (1913)
- King Brockett (1913, player/MGR)
- Ernie Gust (1910–1911)
- Fred Ostendorf (1913)
