= Clarksville Grays =

- 1903–1904; Clarksville, Tennessee

Minor league affiliations
- Class: Class D (1903–1904)
- League: Kentucky–Illinois–Tennessee League (1903–1904)

Major league affiliations
- Team: Unaffiliated (1903–1904)

Minor league titles
- League titles (0): None

Team data
- Name: Clarksville Grays (1904); Clarksville Villagers (1903)
- Ballpark: League Park (1903–1904)

The Clarksville Grays were a Minor League Baseball team that played in the Class D Kentucky–Illinois–Tennessee League (KITTY League) from 1903 to 1904. They were located in Clarksville, Tennessee, and played their home games at League Park. The team was known as the Clarksville Villagers in 1903 before becoming the Grays in 1904.

The Villagers won their 1903 season opener on the road over the Paducah Paddys, 9–5, on May 21. They finished the season in second place with a 60–43 (.583) record, 4 1/2 games out of first. They returned in 1904 as the Grays. Their final games were played on September 14 when they lost both games of a doubleheader, each by scores of 5–4, to the pennant-winning Paducah Indians. Clarksville finished in third place at 64–58 (.525), 9 1/2 games behind Paducah.

The city of Clarksville did not field another professional baseball team until the Clarksville Volunteers joined the KITTY League in 1910.

== Season-by-season results ==
Season	Record	Win %	Finish	GB	Ref.
1903	60–43	.583	2nd	4 1/2	
1904	64–58	.535	3rd	9 1/2	
Totals	124–101	.551	—	—	—

== Notable players ==
Two players also played in at league one game in Major League Baseball during their careers. These players and their seasons with Clarksville were:

- Orth Collins (1903)
- Dolly Stark (1904)
