= Dyersburg Deers =

- 1923–1925; Dyersburg, Tennessee

Minor league affiliations
- Class: Class D (1923–1925)
- League: Tri-State League (1925); Kentucky–Illinois–Tennessee League (1923–1924)

Major league affiliations
- Team: Unaffiliated (1923–1925)

Minor league titles
- League titles (2): 1923; 1924
- First-half titles (2): 1923; 1924

Team data
- Name: Dyersburg Deers (1925); Dyersburg Forked Deers (1923–1924)
- Ballpark: Scot's Field (1923–1925)

The Dyersburg Deers were a Minor League Baseball team that played in Dyersburg, Tennessee, from 1923 to 1925. They were members of the Class D Kentucky–Illinois–Tennessee League (KITTY League) from 1923 to 1924 during which time they were known as the Dyersburg Forked Dears. They played as simply the Dyersburg Deers in the Class D Tri-State League in 1925. Their home games were played at Scot's Field.

Over three seasons of competition, Dyersburg accumulated a regular season record of 170–141 (.547). They won the KITTY League championship in both 1923 and 1924. Their postseason record was 8–2 (.800).

== History ==
The Dyersburg Forked Deers began competition in 1923 as members of the Class D Kentucky–Illinois–Tennessee League. Their scheduled season opener on May 15 was rained out. They won the next day's game against the Fulton Railroaders, 3–2 in 10 innings, at Scot's Field before a home audience of around 1,200 people. On August 24, June Greene pitched a 10–0 no-hitter against Fulton in the second game of a doubleheader. The Forked Dears won the first half of the league's split season, qualifying for the championship playoffs. They then defeated the Mayfield Pantmakers to win the KITTY League championship, four games to two. Their season record was 51–47 (.520).

The Forked Deers repeated as first half champions in 1924. They won a second KITTY League championship by sweeping the Paris Parisians in four games in the best-of-seven championship series. They accumulated a 60–48 (.556) record during the season.

The KITTY League failed to reorganize for the 1925 season, so Dyersburg joined the Class D Tri-State League. They also shortened their name to simply the Dyersburg Deers. On August 17, William Cason no-hit the Blytheville Tigers in a 4–0 home win. The Deers compiled a season record of 59–46 (.562) but failed to win either half of the season.

Dyersburg did not field another team in 1926. Over three years of competition the team accumulated a record of 170–141 (.547).

== Season-by-season results ==
Season	Regular season				Postseason			Ref.
Season	Record	Win %	Finish	GB	Record	Win %	Result	Ref.
1923	51–47	.520	3rd	6	4–2	.667	Result	Won first half title Won KITTY League championship vs. Mayfield Pantmakers, 4–2
1924	60–48	.556	1st	—	4–0	1.000	Won first half title Won KITTY League championship vs. Paris Parisians, 4–0	
1925	59–46	.562	3rd	7 1/2	—	—	—	
Totals	170–141	.547	—	—	8–2	.800	—	—

== Notable players ==
Three players also played in at league one game in Major League Baseball during their careers. These players and their seasons with Dyersburg were:

- June Greene (1924–1925)
- Phil Hensiek (1925)
- Jack Knight (1925)
