= Trenton Reds =

- 1922; Trenton, Tennessee

Minor league affiliations
- Class: Class D
- League: Kentucky–Illinois–Tennessee League

Major league affiliations
- Team: Unaffiliated

Minor league titles
- League titles (0): None

Team data
- Name: Trenton Reds
- Ballpark: Unknown

The Trenton Reds were a Minor League Baseball team that played in the Class D Kentucky–Illinois–Tennessee League in 1922. They were located in Trenton, Tennessee. The Reds opened the season at home with a 4–2 win over the Cairo Egyptians on May 16. The season ended on September 4 with Trenton losing both games of a doubleheader at Cairo, 8–7 and 5–4. They compiled an even 56–56 (.500) record in their only season of competition, finished in fifth place, and failed to win either half of the league's split season.
