= Harley Boss =

American baseball player (1908–1964)

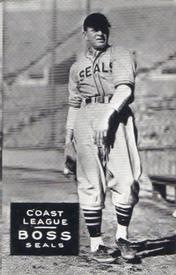
- First baseman
- Born: November 19, 1908; Hodge, Louisiana, U.S.
- Died: May 15, 1964 (aged 55); Nashville, Tennessee, U.S.
- Batted: Left Threw: Left

MLB debut
- July 19, 1928, for the Washington Senators

Last MLB appearance
- September 24, 1933, for the Cleveland Indians

MLB statistics
- Batting average: .268
- Home runs: 1
- Runs batted in: 61
- Stats at Baseball Reference

Teams
- Washington Senators (1928–1930); Cleveland Indians (1933)

Elmer Harley Boss (November 19, 1908 – May 15, 1964) was a Major League Baseball first baseman who played for four seasons. He played for the Washington Senators from 1928 to 1930 and the Cleveland Indians in 1933. He played college baseball for Louisiana Tech. He was inducted into the Louisiana Tech University Athletic Hall of Fame in 1989.

Harley Boss settled in Nashville TN and was in the insurance business. He was the head coach of the Vanderbilt University varsity baseball team for the 1960, 1961, 1963, and 1964 seasons. He was a knowledgeable and colorful manager. He was "old school" in the mode of Casey Stengel. He died shortly after the end of the 1964 season. Several of his players were pall bearers.
