= Paducah Chiefs =

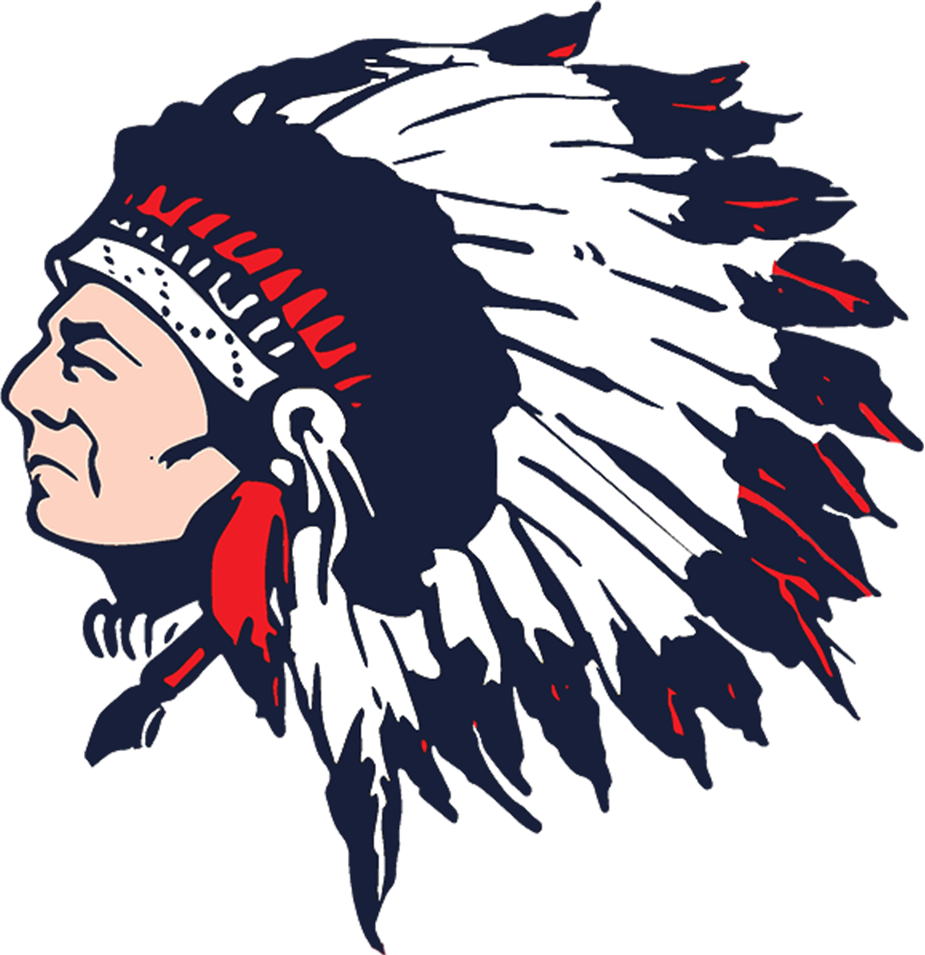
- Logo

Information
- League: Ohio Valley League (OVL South)
- Location: Paducah, Kentucky
- Ballpark: Brooks Stadium (1948–1955, 2016–present)
- Founded: 1903; 123 years ago
- Former league(s): Kentucky–Illinois–Tennessee League, Mississippi–Ohio Valley League
- Colours: Red, navy, white
- General manager: Greg McKeel
- Website: https://www.paducahchiefs.com

The Paducah Chiefs are an amateur collegiate summer baseball team in Paducah, Kentucky. They are a member of the Ohio Valley League. The Chiefs has been a primary nickname for various Paducah teams, who first began play in 1897.

Early incarnations of the Paducah Chiefs played in the Kentucky–Illinois–Tennessee League (KITTY League) in 1903 and 1912–1913, and in the Mississippi–Ohio Valley League in 1949–1950. The Chiefs competed in the KITTY League from 1951 until their disbanding in 1955.

The Chiefs, though finishing fourth in the regular season standings in 1949, went on to win the Mississippi–Ohio Valley League playoffs and championship. In 1950 the Chiefs again finished fourth in the regular season standings, but made through the playoffs to the league championship series against the Centralia Sterlings; the championship series was cancelled due to bad weather. After that season the Chiefs left the Mississippi–Ohio Valley League for the KITTY League.

The Chiefs were the 1955 Kentucky–Illinois–Tennessee League (KITTY League) champions with a 64–39 record, and were the league runner up in 1952 (67–53).

The franchise was affiliated with the St. Louis Cardinals (1952–1955), Brooklyn Dodgers (1939), St. Louis Cardinals (1938), Pittsburgh Pirates (1937) and Cincinnati Reds (1936).

The team was also known as the Paducah Indians for much of its history.

== The Modern Era ==
In 1996, Dr. Frank "Doc" Hideg and a group of volunteers resurrected Brooks Stadium. It proved to be a vital step in bringing amateur baseball back to Paducah, as in 2015, the Brooks Stadium Commission was approached by the Ohio Valley League about adding a team in Paducah. Under the leadership of General Manager Greg McKeel and Brooks Stadium Commission President Doc Hideg, the Chiefs returned to Brooks Stadium in Paducah in the summer of 2016.

== The ballparks ==
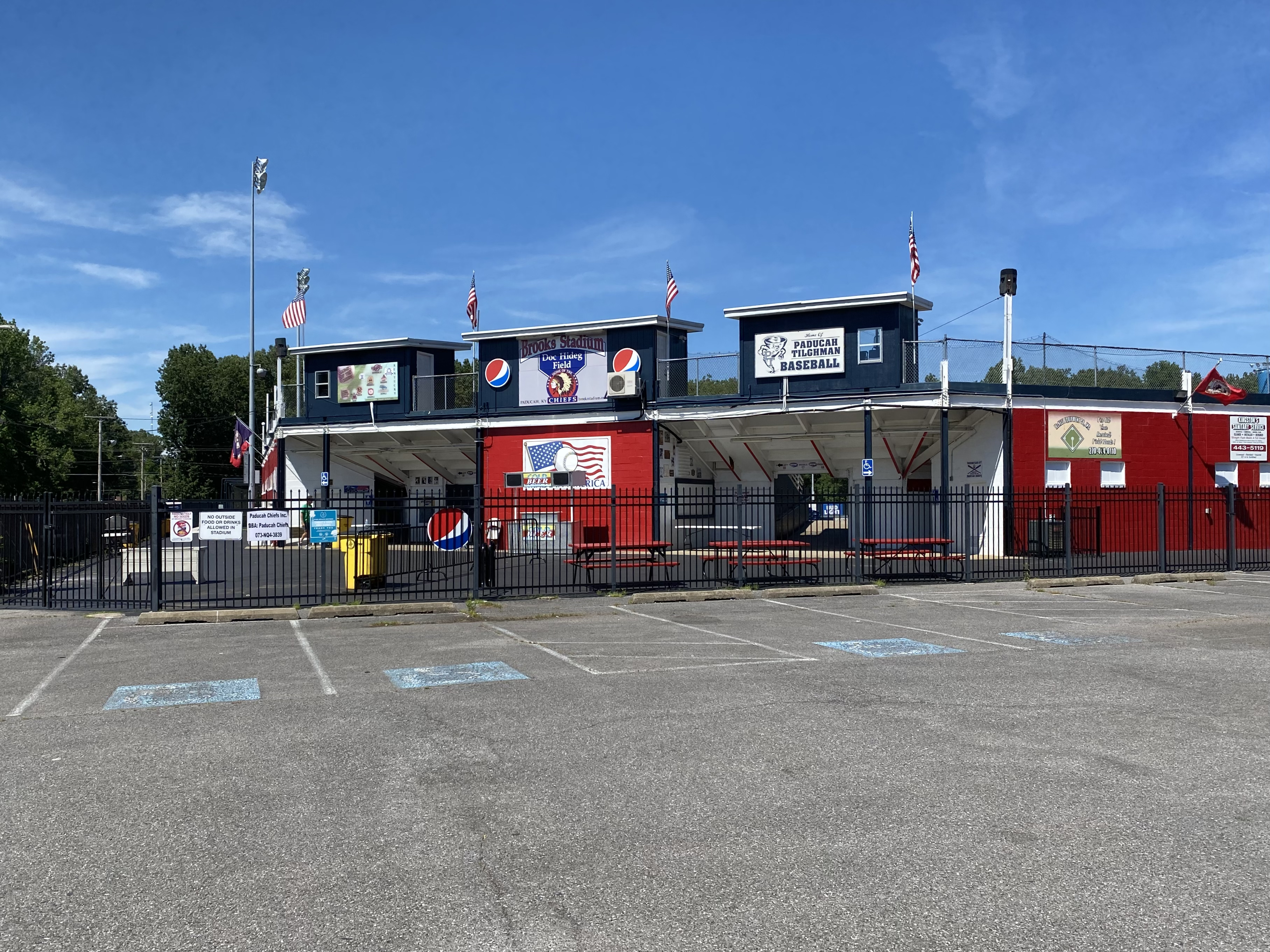
(1922) J. Polk Brooks Stadium. The Chiefs began play at the ballpark in 1949.

The franchise played at numerous parks in Paducah.

From 1949 to 1955 Paducah teams played at Brooks Stadium, located at 25th Street and C Street, now 2400 Brooks Stadium Drive. Brooks Stadium hosted the Mississippi-Ohio Valley League All-Star Game in 1949. The ballpark has remained in use to this day as the baseball home for the nearby Paducah Tilghman High School.

Earlier, the team played at Hook's Park, located at 8th street and Terrell, from 1935 to 1941. In 1922 and 1923 Paducah played at League Park. Early teams played at Wallace Park located at Broadway and Labelle.

== Notable alumni ==
- Alan Roden (2019) 2022 MLB Draft selection
