= Hughie Wise =

American baseball player (1906–1987)

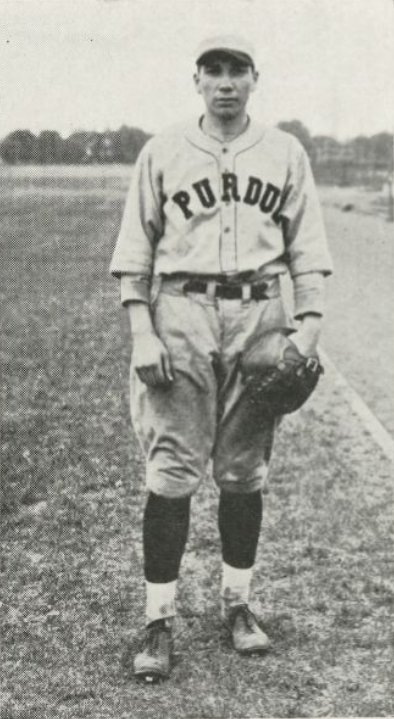
- yearbook photo of Wise at Purdue, 1926
- Catcher
- Born: March 9, 1906; Campbellsville, Kentucky, U.S.
- Died: July 21, 1987 (aged 81); Plantation, Florida, U.S.
- Batted: Switch Threw: Right

MLB debut
- September 26, 1930, for the Detroit Tigers

Last MLB appearance
- September 27, 1930, for the Detroit Tigers

MLB statistics
- Batting average: .333
- At bats: 6
- Hits: 2
- Stats at Baseball Reference

Teams
- Detroit Tigers (1930)

Hugh Edward Wise (March 9, 1906 – July 21, 1987) was an American professional baseball catcher, manager and scout. A native of Campbellsville, Kentucky, Wise attended Purdue University, where he played college baseball for the Boilermakers from 1926 to 1927. His son Casey Wise played Major League Baseball, and another son, Hugh Jr., played in the minor leagues.

Hugh Sr.'s major league career occurred over a two-day period, September 26–27, 1930, for the Detroit Tigers. He batted six times, with two hits, both singles. He handled 11 total chances in the field without an error. Wise played for 13 seasons in the minor leagues (1930–1941; 1946), and managed in the mid-to-lower minor leagues during the late 1930s and 1940s, largely in the Class D KITTY League. He then turned to scouting for the Boston Braves/Milwaukee Braves, New York Yankees and Chicago White Sox. His duties at one time included scouting the Caribbean and Latin America and designing baseball fields.

He died in Plantation, Florida, at age 81.
