= Mickey O'Neil =

American baseball player (1898-1964)

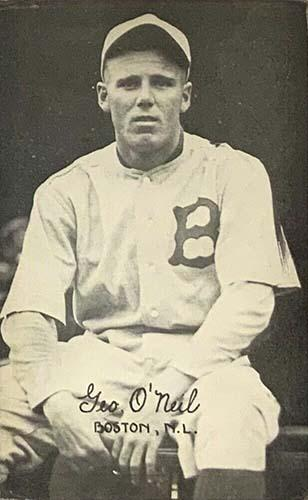
- Catcher
- Born: April 12, 1900; St. Louis, Missouri, U.S.
- Died: April 8, 1964 (aged 65); St. Louis, Missouri, U.S.
- Batted: Right Threw: Right

MLB debut
- September 12, 1919, for the Boston Braves

Last MLB appearance
- June 19, 1927, for the New York Giants

MLB statistics
- Batting average: .238
- Home runs: 4
- Runs batted in: 179
- Stats at Baseball Reference

Teams
- Boston Braves (1919–1925); Brooklyn Robins (1926); Washington Senators (1927); New York Giants (1927)

George Michael Jakob O'Neil (April 12, 1898 – April 8, 1964) was an American professional baseball player who played catcher from 1919 to 1927.

O'Neil was coaching third base for the Brooklyn Robins when Babe Herman "doubled into a double play" against the Boston Braves August 15, 1926. Otto Miller was the Dodgers' regular third base coach, but before the seventh inning, complained about getting tired walking there and back from the dugout because nothing happened at third base. O'Neil jumped up and offered to coach in Miller's place. The Dodgers promptly loaded the bases with one out. Herman then hit the ball off the right field wall for an easy double and tried to stretch it into a triple. Chick Fewster, who had been on first base, advanced to third – which was already occupied by Dazzy Vance, who had started from second base but got a slow start because he hadn't seen the hit well, became caught in a rundown between third and home, and was trying to get back to third. All three ended up on third base, with Herman not having watched the play in front of him. The third baseman, Eddie Taylor, tagged everybody to be sure of getting as many outs as possible. The slow-footed Vance had been a major contributor to the situation, but he was the lead runner and not forced to advance, so according to the rules, he was entitled to the base, and umpire Beans Reardon called Herman and Fewster out, ending the inning. As third base coach, O'Neil also bore some blame for the situation. However, Hank DeBerry, who had started the play as the runner on third, scored the game's winning run on the play before the daffiness started.

O'Neil was later a coach for the Cleveland Indians in 1930, a scout for the Pittsburgh Pirates from 1947 to 1948 and a minor league manager at various times from 1940 to 1955.
