= Dave Bartosch =

American baseball player (1917–2006)

- Outfielder
- Born: March 24, 1917; St. Louis, Missouri, U.S.
- Died: April 30, 2006 (aged 89); Nashville, Tennessee, U.S.
- Batted: Right Threw: Right

MLB debut
- April 28, 1945, for the St. Louis Cardinals

Last MLB appearance
- July 22, 1945, for the St. Louis Cardinals

MLB statistics
- Batting average: .255
- Home runs: 0
- Runs batted in: 1
- Stats at Baseball Reference

Teams
- St. Louis Cardinals (1945)

David Robert Bartosch (March 24, 1917 – April 30, 2006) was an American corner outfielder in Major League Baseball who played for the St. Louis Cardinals in their 1945 season. Listed at 6' 1", 190 lb., Bartosch batted and threw right-handed. He was born in St. Louis, Missouri.

Bartosch played minor league baseball from 1936 to 1940 and in 1945 and served in the United States Coast Guard during World War II.

He hit for an average of .255 (12-for-47) in 24 games for the Cardinals, including a double, one RBI, 12 hits and nine runs scored. He scouted for the Cardinals and San Diego Padres after his playing career ended.

Bartosch died in 2006 in Nashville, Tennessee, at the age of 89.

== Sources ==
- Baseball Reference (MLB)
- Baseball Reference (MiLB)
