= Bill Hart (infielder) =

American baseball player (1913-1968)

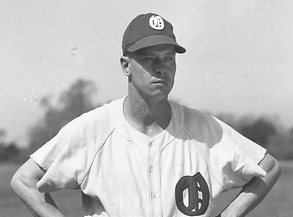
- Hart, circa 1947
- Infielder
- Born: March 4, 1913; Wiconisco, Pennsylvania, U.S.
- Died: July 29, 1968 (aged 55); Lykens, Pennsylvania, U.S.
- Batted: Left Threw: Left

MLB debut
- September 18, 1943, for the Brooklyn Dodgers

Last MLB appearance
- August 5, 1945, for the Brooklyn Dodgers

MLB statistics
- Batting average: .207
- Home runs: 3
- Runs: 35
- Stats at Baseball Reference

Teams
- Brooklyn Dodgers (1943–1945)

William Woodrow Hart (March 4, 1913 – July 29, 1968) was an American third baseman and shortstop in Major League Baseball who played from 1943 to 1945 for the Brooklyn Dodgers. Born in Wiconisco, Pennsylvania, he died at age 55 in Lykens, Pennsylvania.
