= Jackson Climbers =

- 1911; Jackson, Tennessee

Minor league affiliations
- Class: Class D
- League: Kentucky–Illinois–Tennessee League

Major league affiliations
- Team: Unaffiliated

Minor league titles
- League titles (0): None

Team data
- Name: Jackson Climbers
- Ballpark: Lakeview Ball Park

The Jackson Climbers were a Minor League Baseball team that played in the Class D Kentucky–Illinois–Tennessee League in 1911. The Climbers were based in Jackson, Tennessee, and played their home games at Lakeview Ball Park. The team began the season in Harrisburg, Illinois, as the Harrisburg Miners but relocated on August 13 after severe financial losses.

Jackson assumed Harrisburg's 8–15 (.348) record. After transferring, Jackson's first game was a 6–1 win on the road against the Cairo Egyptians on August 14. The Climbers closed out the season on September 22 by losing both games of a doubleheader to the Paducah Polecats, 8–0 and 4–1. In Jackson, the Climbers went 57–43 (.570). Their composite record across both cities was 65–58 (.528), placing seventh of eight teams. They failed to win either half of the league's split-season in their only year of competition.

== Notable players ==
The only Climber to also play in Major League Baseball was Ernie Gust, who made his major league debut with the St. Louis Browns on August 17, 1911.
