= Tony Rensa =

American baseball player (1901–1987)

- Catcher
- Born: September 28, 1901; Parsons, Pennsylvania, U.S.
- Died: January 4, 1987 (aged 85); Wilkes-Barre, Pennsylvania, U.S.
- Batted: Right Threw: Right

MLB debut
- May 5, 1930, for the Detroit Tigers

Last MLB appearance
- August 27, 1939, for the Chicago White Sox

MLB statistics
- Batting average: .261
- Home runs: 7
- Runs batted in: 65
- Stats at Baseball Reference

Teams
- Detroit Tigers (1930); Philadelphia Phillies (1930–1931); New York Yankees (1933); Chicago White Sox (1937–1939)

George Anthony Rensa (September 29, 1901 – January 4, 1987) was an American professional baseball player in Major League Baseball. Rensa played for the New York Yankees, Detroit Tigers, Philadelphia Phillies and the Chicago White Sox. He batted and threw right-handed.

He was born in Parsons, Pennsylvania and died in Wilkes-Barre, Pennsylvania.

In 200 games over six seasons, Rensa posted a .261 batting average (134-for-514) with 71 runs, 7 home runs, 65 RBI and 57 bases on balls. Defensively, he recorded a .965 fielding percentage as a catcher.
