= Herb Welch (baseball) =

American baseball player (1898–1967)

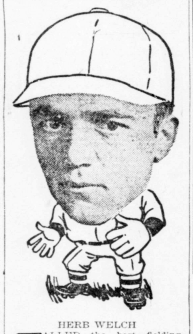
- Shortstop
- Born: October 19, 1898; Ro Ellen, Tennessee, U.S.
- Died: April 13, 1967 (aged 68); Memphis, Tennessee, U.S.
- Batted: Left Threw: Right

MLB debut
- September 15, 1925, for the Boston Red Sox

Last MLB appearance
- October 1, 1925, for the Boston Red Sox

MLB statistics
- Batting average: .289
- Home runs: 0
- Runs batted in: 2
- Stats at Baseball Reference

Teams
- Boston Red Sox (1925)

Herbert M. Welch [Dutch] (October 19, 1898 – April 13, 1967) was an American backup shortstop in Major League Baseball who played briefly for the Boston Red Sox during the 1925 season. Listed at 5 ft 6 in (1.68 m), 154 lb., Welch batted left-handed and threw right-handed. He was born in Ro Ellen, Tennessee.

In a 13-game career, Welch was a .289 hitter (11-for-38) with two runs, one triple, and two RBI without any home runs.

Welch died at the age of 68 in Memphis, Tennessee.

== See also ==
- 1925 Boston Red Sox season
