= Mayfield Clothiers =

- 1922–1955; (1922–1924, 1936–1941, 1946–1955); Mayfield, Kentucky

Minor league affiliations
- Class: Class D (1922–1924, 1936–1941, 1946–1955)
- League: Kentucky–Illinois–Tennessee League (1922–1924, 1936–1941, 1946–1955)

Major league affiliations
- Team: New York Giants (1953–1955); Pittsburgh Pirates (1950–1952); St. Louis Browns (1937–1941, 1946–1949); Brooklyn Dodgers (1936)

Minor league titles
- League titles (5): 1922; 1923; 1937; 1941; 1950

Team data
- Name: Mayfield Clothiers (1946–1955); Mayfield Browns (1939–1941); Mayfield Clothiers (1936–1938); Mayfield Pantsmakers (1922–1924)
- Ballpark: Graves County War Memorial Stadium (1952–1955); Tenth Street Park (1946–1951); Hunts Park (1937–1941); Sportsman's Park (aka Merit Park) (1936)

The Mayfield Clothiers was the primary moniker of the minor league baseball teams based in Mayfield, Kentucky that played from 1922 to 1924 and 1936–1955 (with a break from 1942 to 1945 when the league was shut down during World War II). The Mayfield teams played exclusively in the Class D level Kentucky–Illinois–Tennessee League ("KITTY League").

== Notable alumni ==
- Floyd Baker (1938)
- Dave Garcia (1955)
- Walter Holke (1937)
- Larry Kennedy (1938)
- Charlie Metro (1938)
- Clarence Mitchell (1937)
- Jim Russell (1938)
- Bob Skinner (1951) 3 x MLB All-Star
- Bennie Tate (1938)
- Vern Stephens (1938) 8 x MLB All-Star
