= Hopkinsville Hoppers =

Former professional baseball team in Kentucky, United States (1903–1954)

- 1903–1954; (1903–1905, 1910–1914, 1916, 1922–1923, 1935–1942, 1946–1954); Hopkinsville, Kentucky

Minor league affiliations
- Class: Class D (1903–1954)
- League: Kitty League (1903–1954)

Major league affiliations
- Team: Philadelphia Athletics (1953–1954); Chicago Cubs (1946); Milwaukee Brewers (1937–1939)

Minor league titles
- League titles (1): 1947

Team data
- Name: Hopkinsville Hoppers (1905–1954); Hopkinsville Browns (1903–1904)

The Hopkinsville Hoppers were a baseball team based in Hopkinsville, Kentucky between 1903 and 1954. The team initially played as the "Browns" in 1903 and 1904, before adopting the "Hoppers" moniker.

Hopkinsville teams played as exclusively as members of the Kentucky–Illinois–Tennessee League in 1903–1905, 1910–1914, 1916, 1922–1923, 1935–1942, 1946–1954.

Hopkinsville was affiliate of the Milwaukee Brewers (AA) from 1937 to 1939; Chicago Cubs 1946; Philadelphia A's 1953–1954.

Today, the "Hoppers" team moniker has been adopted by the summer collegiate baseball wood-bat team that plays as a member of the Ohio Valley League, after the current team was founded in 2012. In 2012, Hopkinsville had the highest attendance in the league.

== Notable alumni ==
- Al Demaree (1910)
- Dave Koslo (1939) 1949 NL ERA Title
- Dusty Rhodes (1947)
- Johnny Schmitz (1938) 2 x MLB All-Star
- Art Wilson (1922)

== Year-by-year record ==
Year	Record	Finish	Manager	Playoffs
1904	52–68	5th	John Ferrell	none
1905	31–44	--		Team withdrew July 18
1910	50–68	4th	Dave Anderson (minors) / John Ray	cancelled
1911	78–46	1st	John Nairn	Co-Champs
1912	44–54	5th	Dudley Lewis / Nig Langdon / Tom Atkins	none
1913	73–53	3rd	George Kalkhoff	none
1914	20–45	--	George Kalkhoff	Team disbanded July 10
1916	22–56	6th	William Schwartz	League disbanded August 4
1922	62–51	2nd	Bill Catton / Art Nilson	
1923	52–51	5th	Ben Smith	
1935	46–45	3rd	John Suther	no champions
1936	46–72	7th	Ralph McKnight / Jesse Petty / Budd Adams / Lyle Judy	
1937	71–50	2nd	Red Smith	Lost in 1st round
1938	76–53	1st	Red Smith	Lost League Finals
1939	57–68	5th	Harry Griswold	
1940	35–89	8th	Dutch Welch	
1941	69–57	2nd	Chet Wilburn	Lost League Finals
1942	23–23	4th	Melvin Ivy	League disbanded June 19
1946	73–53	2nd	Calvin Chapman	Lost in 1st round
1947	69–56	3rd	Frank Scalzi	League Champs
1948	85–41	1st	Vito Tamulis	Lost in 1st round
1949	68–56	3rd	John Mueller	Lost in 1st round
1950	60–60	6th	Joe DeMasi	
1951	41–78	8th	Steve Carter (minors) / Vito Tamulis	
1952	50–70	6th	Larry Brunke	
1953	59–60	4th	Norman Wilson / Ed Wright	Lost in 1st round
1954	58–59	6th	Ed Wright / Bearl Brooks / Richards Ramsey	
