= Paducah Indians (baseball) =

- 1904–1941; (1903–1906, 1910–1914, 1922–1924, 1935–1941, 1949–1955); Paducah, Kentucky

Minor league affiliations
- Class: Class D (1903–1906, 1910–1914, 1922–1924, 1935–1941, 1949–1955)
- League: Kentucky–Illinois–Tennessee League (Kitty League) (1903–1906, 1910–1914, 1922–1924, 1935–1941); Mississippi–Ohio Valley League (1949–1950); Kentucky–Illinois–Tennessee League (1951–1955)

Major league affiliations
- Team: Cincinnati Reds (1936); Pittsburgh Pirates (1937); St. Louis Cardinals (1938); Brooklyn Dodgers (1939); St. Louis Cardinals (1952–1955)

Minor league titles
- League titles (6): 1904; 1905; 1913; 1949; 1953; 1955
- Conference titles: 1936; 1955
- Wild card berths (5): 1949; 1950; 1951; 1952; 1953

Team data
- Name: Paducah Chiefs (1903); Paducah Indians (1904–1906, 1910); Paducah Polecats (1911); Paducah Chiefs (1912–1913); Paducah Indians (1914, 1922–1923); Paducah Red Birds (1935); Paducah Indians (1936–1941); Paducah Chiefs (1949–1955)
- Ballpark: Wallace Park (1903–1906, 1910–1914); League Park (1922–1924); Hooks Park (1935–1941); J. Polk Brooks Stadium (1949–1955)

The Paducah Indians were a minor league baseball team based in Paducah, Kentucky, United States. Between 1903 and 1955, Paducah teams played five separate tenures as members of the Class D level Kentucky–Illinois–Tennessee League, also known as the Kitty League. Paducah also played two seasons in the Class D level Mississippi–Ohio Valley League. The team was interchangeably known as the Paducah "Chiefs" during its tenure of minor league play and both nicknames tie to local history.

Paducah won six minor league championships (1904, 1905, 1913, 1949, 1953, 1955) and one league pennant (1936).

Paducah teams played single seasons as minor league affiliates of the Cincinnati Reds (1936), Pittsburgh Pirates (1937) and Brooklyn Dodgers (1939) and two different tenures as a minor league affiliate of the St. Louis Cardinals (1938, 1952–1955).

Paducah hosted minor league home games at three different locations. The first ballpark site was called Wallace Park (1903–1906, 1910–1914) and then League Park (1922–1924). The Paducah teams next played at Hooks Park from 1935 to 1941. Beginning in 1949, Paducah began play at J. Polk Brooks Stadium, which is still in use today. Both Hooks Park and J. Polk Brooks Stadium were named after owners of the Paducah franchise who built the ballparks to host the team.

== History ==
=== Early Paducah baseball ===
Organized baseball was played in Paducah, Kentucky as early as 1861.

In the 1897 season, minor league baseball began in Paducah when the Paducah Little Colonels played the season as members of the Class C level Central League. The Central League folded before completing the 1897 season schedule. The Little Colonels played their partial season in the six-team league with the Cairo Egyptians, Evansville Brewers, Nashville Centennials, Terre Haute Hottentots, and Washington Browns as fellow members.

Beginning in 1901, Paducah hosted the Paducah "Nationals'" an early Negro Leagues team that played through 1904. The team owner of the Paducah Nationals team was Ben Boyd. Boyd was also the Nationals' team manager and a player on the team. The Paducah Nationals traveled to Atlanta, Keokuk, Iowa, New Orleans, Chicago, St. Louis and Memphis to play games. The Nationals played at Eureka Park in Paducah and Boyd arranged to have reserved seating for white baseball fans who attended games.

=== 1903: Charter members of Kentucky–Illinois–Tennessee League ===
First formed in the winter of 1902, the organization of the Kentucky–Illinois–Tennessee League was led by Dr. Frank Bassett, a businessman and attorney from Hopkinsville, Kentucky. Bassett also became the owner of the Hopkinsville franchise. Upon the official formation of the league, Bassett was named as the league president and began a lengthy tenure as the league's top official. Paducah, Kentucky was awarded a franchise in the new league. Gabby Street became the first player signed to play in the new league, as Frank Bassett secured the future Hall of Fame member to play on his Hopkinsville team.

In the 1903 season, minor league baseball resumed in Paducah when the Paducah "Chiefs" became charter members of the eight–team, Class D level Kentucky–Illinois–Tennessee League, which became known informally as the KITTY League. Paducah joined the Cairo Egyptians, Clarksville Villagers , Henderson Hens, Hopkinsville Hoppers, Jackson Railroaders, Owensboro Distillers, and Vincennes Alices teams in forming the new league, which began its first season of play on May 21, 1903. In the era before formal team nicknames and marketing logos, the Paducah team was also referred to as the "Paddys" in 1903.

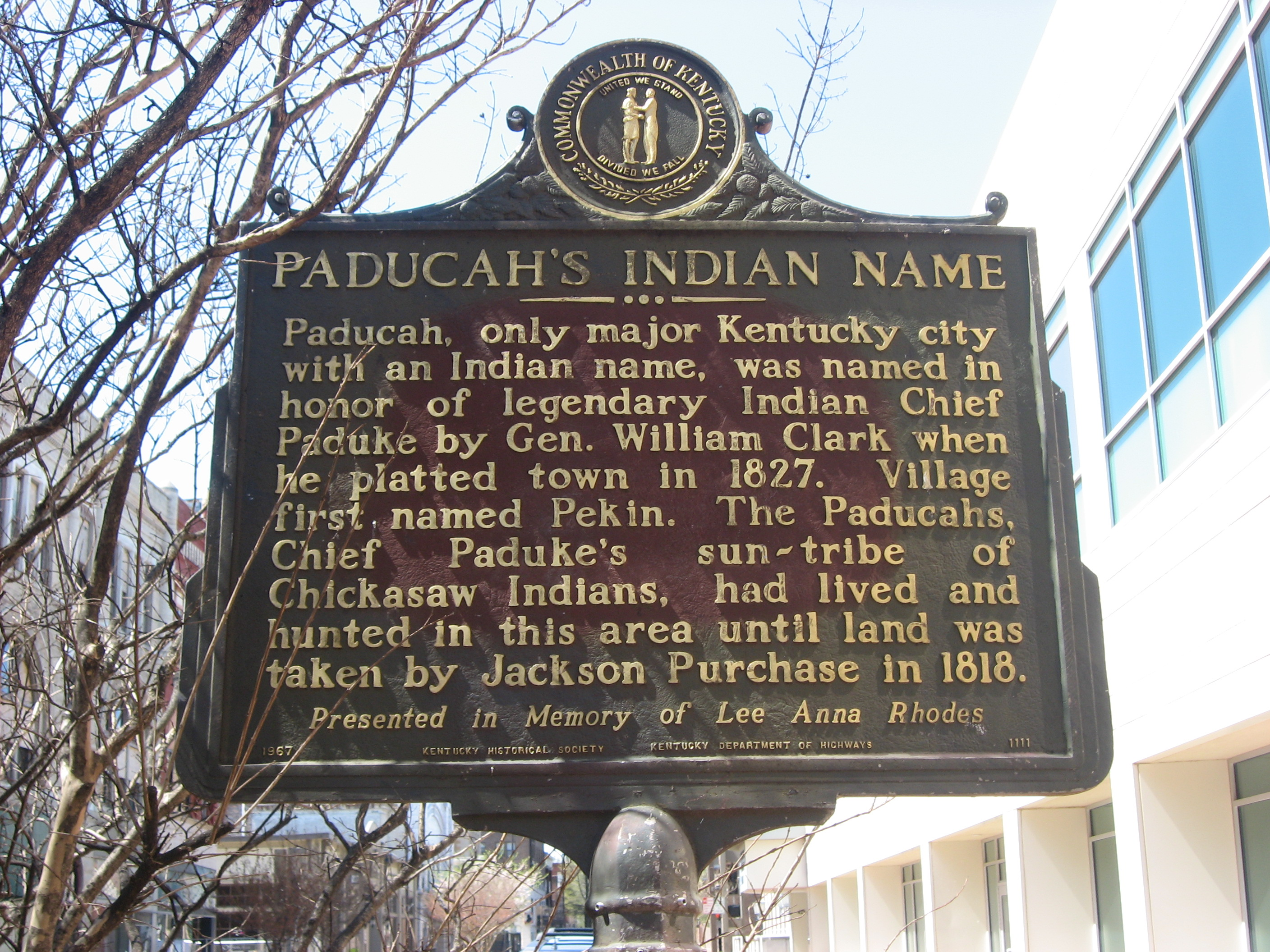
(2013) Paducah's Indian Name historical marker, Paducah, Kentucky.

As the Paducah team began minor league play, it's baseball teams became known by the "Indians" and "Chiefs" nicknames in its tenure of play. Both nicknames tie to Paducah's local history. The city of Paducah is named in honor of Chickasaw Indian Chief Paduke. The city of Paducah was named for Chief Paduke by famed explorer William Clark when he first plotted the city in 1827. The Paducahs, Chief Paduke's tribe, had inhabited the area until the land was taken by the Jackson Purchase of 1818. The village was first called Pekin. Today, there is a Historical Marker describing the Indian name. The historical marker is located at 415 Broadway Street, near the intersection of North Fifth Street in Paducah, Kentucky.

On May 21, 1903, the Chiefs played in their Kitty League debut game in their opening day game at home against the Clarksville Villagers. Paducah lost the season opener to Clarksville by the score of 9–5.

In the first season of play in the newly formed league, the Chiefs finished with a 47–59 record in the final Kitty League standings. The Paducah Chiefs placed fifth in the eight-team league, finishing 19.0 games behind the first place Cairo Egyptians while playing the season under managers Sam Jackson, Roy Gage and Cooney Best.

After the first season of the Kitty League had concluded, the league's franchise owners met in Cairo, Illinois for an end of season meeting and to disperse the season profits. Reportedly, the meeting took place in a back room of a saloon. Subsequently, a fist fight broke out among the owners during the meeting.

=== 1904–1906: Kitty League / Two championships ===
The Paducah team became known as the "Indians" in the 1904 season. Paducah continued play in the 1904 Kitty League and won the league championship. Their final games of the 1904 season were played on September 14 when the Indians won both games of a doubleheader to end the season. Playing on the road, Paducah won both games by scores of 5–4, against the Clarksville Grays.

The Indians placed first in final the Kentucky–Illinois–Tennessee League standings as the league reduced to six teams from eight teams, after the Jackson Railroaders and Owensboro Distillers teams did not return to the league. The Paducah Indians compiled a record of 73–48, ending the Kitty League season in first place in the final standings. No league playoffs were held. Paducah played their championship season under managers Red Gilliam and John Ray. In a close race, the Indians finished just 1.0 game ahead of the second place Cairo Champions (72–49) in the final standings.

In 1905, the Paducah Indians continued Kentucky–Illinois–Tennessee League play and defended their league championship in a shortened season due to an epidemic. Paducah ended the shortened Kitty League season in first place, occupying that spot when the league stopped play.

On June 11, 1905, Indians pitcher Bill Frakes threw the first no-hitter in the franchise history, just months before his death. Frakes defeated Princeton 3–0 in a home game and had 1 walk and 1 strikeout in the game, which was interrupted by rain. Paducah had a record of 28–10 after the game and were in second place behind the 28–9 Vincennes Alices. After pitching for the Clarksville Grays in 1904, "Billy" Frakes joined Paducah to begin the 1905 season. Frakes was released by Paducah on August 10, 1905, and rejoined an independent Gallatin team, for whom he had pitched in 1902 and 1903. Shortly after returning to the Gallatin team, Frakes died on August 20, 1905, in Gallatin, Tennessee at age 22.

The Indians had compiled a record of 68–35 when the Kitty League halted play on August 17, 1905, with National Association permission, due to the Yellow Fever epidemic. In winning their second consecutive championship, the Indians were managed by Harry Lloyd. During the season, both the Henderson Hens and Hopkinsville Browns folded on July 18, 1905, leaving four remaining teams to finish the season. Paducah finished 4½ games ahead of the second place Vincennes Alices in the final standings. Following the stoppage of the Kitty League season, the Vincennes and Paducah teams played another 13 games against each other, with Vincennes winning 7 games and Paducah 6.

Playing for Paducah at age 29, former major league pitcher Wiley Piatt pitched to a 23–3 record for Paducah in 1905. With his success, Piatt was nicknamed "King of the Kitty" before being told to the Toledo Mud Hens on August 8, 1905. Piatt rejoined the Indians for the 1906 season.

The 1906 Paducah Indians continued Kentucky–Illinois–Tennessee League play in defense of their two consecutive league championships. The Danville Old Soldiers, Mattoon-Charleston Canaries and Jacksonville Jacks joined with Cairo, Paducah and Vincennes in the six-team league.

With Harry Lloyd returning as the Paducah manager in 1906, the Indians finished the Kentucky–Illinois–Tennessee League season in fifth place. With a final record of 57–69, Paducah finished 19½ games behind the first place Vincennes Alices in the final standings of the Class D level league. No playoffs were held following the season. Paducah's player/manager Harry Lloyd batted .189 in 402 at bats while appearing in 108 games for the Indians.

At age 30, lefthander Wiley Piatt returned to Paducah and pitched his second season for the Indians in 1906, compiling a 4–8 record with a 2.79 ERA in 13 games and 116 innings for the Indians. Piatt had previously pitched in the major leagues from 1898 to 1903 with the Philadelphia Phillies (1898–1900), Philadelphia Athletics (1901), Chicago White Sox (1901–1902) and Boston Beaneaters (1903). After a record of 47–29 while pitching 611 innings in his first two major league seasons, Piatt had an 86–79 career record with a 3.60 ERA in 182 career major league appearances, 139 of which were complete games. Piatt's major league career was marred by injuries and illnesses after his first two seasons and he left minor league baseball after the 1908 season. In 1913 he had a tryout with Paducah but was unable to secure a contract.

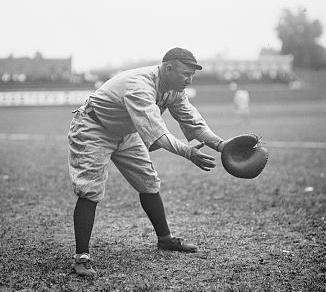
(1913) Grover Land, Cleveland Naps, Land was the catcher for Paducah from 1904 to 1906 as the team won two championships.

Catcher Grover Land played on the Paducah teams from 1904 to 1906 to begin his professional career. His baseball career lasted to 1930 as a player and a coach, as Land played in the major leagues for the Cleveland Naps (1908–1911, 1913) and Brooklyn Tip-Tops (1914–1915). In his major league career, Land batted .243 with 0 home runs and 80 RBIs while appearing in 293 games.

Land was noted to be a colorful character with a temper, and he had actions that caused controversy. Land's baseball career was interrupted by service in the U.S. Army during World War I. In 1911, Land was charged for assault after punching a gate worker at the ballpark in Cleveland after a friend of his was denied free admission to a game. In the same year he shot and wounded the proprietor of a restaurant after a dispute. In 1926, Land was put on trial for firing a gun at his spouse. In 1928, Land became a coach with the Cincinnati Reds.

After the completion of the 1906 season, the Kitty League did not return to play in 1907. Paducah did not host a team in the 1908 and 1909 seasons as the Class D kevel league remained dormant.

=== 1910–1914: Kitty League / One championship ===
After not fielding a minor league team from 1907 to 1909, the Paducah Indians resumed play in 1910. In 1910, the Kentucky–Illinois–Tennessee League reformed as a Class D level league, fielding four teams to begin the season, with Paducah securing a franchise and resuming Kitty League play. The league was revived led by efforts of C.G. Gosnell, of Vincennes, Indiana, who became president of the reformed the Kitty League.

In resuming play in the reformed league, Paducah joined the Clarksville Volunteers, Hopkinsville Hoppers and Vincennes Alices teams in the Kitty League to begin the season. The Harrisburg Merchants and McLeansboro Miners joined the league on July 24, 1910, and a second half schedule was played with the Kitty League becoming a six-team league.

In returning to the Class D level six-team Kentucky–Illinois–Tennessee League, the 1911 team resumed play known again as the Paducah "Indians." The Indians placed third in the six-team standings, ending the season with a 55–64 record. Led by manager Harry Cooper, the Indians ended the season 9½ games behind of the first Vincennes Alices in the overall standings. A scheduled playoff between Vincennes and the McLeansboro Miners (40–18) was cancelled and the two teams were declared co-champions as the league played a split season schedule. Paducah player/manager Harry Cooper batted .211 while appearing in 23 games in his only recorded season of professional baseball.

The 1911 Paducah team was known as the "Polecats" as the franchise continued Kitty League membership. The Class D level Kentucky–Illinois–Tennessee League expanded to become an eight-team league, adding the Harrisburg Miners and Fulton Colonels teams to the league.

Replacing Harry Cooper as the Paducah manager, former major league player Ollie Pickering became the Paducah player/manager at the end of the 1911 season, his first of two managerial stints with the team. At age 41, Pickering hit .283 on the season, playing in the outfield. Pickering had previously played in the major leagues with the Louisville Colonels (1896–1897), Cleveland Spiders (1897), Cleveland Blues/Bronchos (1901–1902), Philadelphia Athletics (1903–1904), St. Louis Browns (1907) and Washington Senators (1908), batting .271 with 194 career stolen bases in 884 career major league games. After taking over the Paducah team, Pickering led the Polecats to victories in 26 of their final 35 games.

Polecats' pitcher Paul Gossage threw a no-hitter for Paducah on May 30, 1911, in a home game against the Hopkinsville Hoppers. Gossage won the game 3–1 and had no walks, but Paducah committed errors in the contest, so it was not a perfect game. After his no hit game, Gossage did not complete the season with Paducah, as he was released in June. A native of Lola, Kentucky, Gossage attended the University of Kentucky and pitched for Paducah in his first professional season. He pitched in the minor leagues through the 1916 season.

On August 28, 1911, Paducah was part of another memorable game. James Coleman of Fulton pitched a 7–inning perfect game against the Paducah Polecats in a 1–0 Fulton victory.

The Polecats ended their season on September 22 by sweeping a doubleheader against the Jackson Climbers. Paducah won both games to close out the season in defeating Jackson by scores of 8–0 and 4–1. Paducah ended the season by winning 26 of their final 35 games after Ollie Pickering took over as manager.

With their strong finish to the 1911 season, the Polecats placed fifth in the eight–team league with an overall record of 58–64. Paducah finished 19.0 games behind the first place Hopkinsville Hoppers as Harry Lloyd and Ollie Pickering managed the Paducah Polecats team in 1911. A post season playoff between Fulton and Hopkinsville was cancelled due to inclement weather. Fulton and Hopkinsville were declared co-champions in the Kitty League.

The team continued play becoming known as Paducah "Chiefs" for the 1912 Kitty League season. After the strong finish in 1911, the team was unable to reach contract terms with Ollie Pickering to return to manage the Paducah team in 1912. With a new manager, Paducah continued play in the Kentucky–Illinois–Tennessee League as the league reduced to a six-team league 1912, with the Fulton Colonets and Jackson Merchants teams not returning.

The 1912 Kitty League championship was won by the Clarksville Rebels in the six–team Class D level league. Paducah ended their season in fourth place with a record of 45–55. The Paducah "Chiefs" were managed by John Nairn and Dave Anderson as the team finished 24½ games behind the first place Clarksville in the final league standings. Patrick Bohannon of Paducah won the league batting championship, hitting .326. An outfielder, Bohannon was a career minor leaguer who played for Paducah at age 33. He had 4 home runs while winning the batting title. Paducah's player/manager John Narin batted .256 while playing in 49 games for his Chiefs team, playing first base.

At age 30, third baseman Art Brouthers became the Paducah player/manager in 1913, replacing Dave Anderson. Art Brouthers had played in 37 games for the 1906 Philadelphia Athletics. After his baseball career ended, Brouthers became a hotel detective in Charleston, South Carolina.

Playing the season under player/manager Art Brouthers, the Paducah Chiefs won the 1913 Kentucky–Illinois–Tennessee League championship. That season the Kitty League expanded into an eight-team league, adding the Owensboro Distillers and Harrisburg Coal Miners teams as members. The Paducah Chiefs finished in first place with a record of 80–47, the team won the championship, as Paducah finished just 1.0 game ahead of the second place Clarksville Volunteers (78–47) in the final standings. No Kitty League playoffs were held. Infielder Grady Burgess of Paducah had 172 total hits to lead the Kitty League in hits. In his third and final season with Paducah, Burgess had a strong season, batting .330 with 6 home runs while playing second base. Paducah player/manager Art Brouthers batted .280 with 1 home run in 111 games for the Indians, playing third base for the championship team.

In 1914, the Kentucky–Illinois–Tennessee League reduced to six teams and the Paducah "Indians" continued league play. The Harrisburg Coal Miners and Vincennes Alices did not return to the league.

Paducah was the defending Kitty League champions in 1914 and finished the season with a record of 59–65 to end the season in fourth place in the Class D level league. The Indians played the season under returning manager Art Brouthers and his replacement, player Dow Van Dine. Paducah ended the season 18½ games behind the champion Cairo Egyptians in the final standings. Charlie Gosnell of Paducah led the league in total hits with 135 on the season. Playing in the outfield in his second season with Paducah, Gosnell batted .286 in 124 games on the season with 7 home runs. He played one more season in the minor leagues in 1915 before leaving baseball. Third baseman Dow Van Dine played his final professional season in 1914 at age 34, playing in 122 games and batting .264. while becoming the player/manager to end the season.

Cather Hank DeBerry hit .286 with 2 home runs in 86 games for Paducah in 1914 at age 19. It was his first professional season. DeBerry advanced and played 11 seasons in the major leagues for the Cleveland Indians (1916–1917) and Brooklyn Robins (1922–1930), batting .267 with 11 home runs and 234 RBIs in 648 career major league games.

The Kitty League did not play in 1915 during World War I. The league reformed and played a 1916 season without Paducah as a member, as Dr. Frank Bassett reformed the league for one season. The Clarksville Volunteers, Dawson Springs Resorters, Henderson Hens, Hopkinsville Hoppers, Madisonville Miners and Owensboro Distillers teams played in the 1916 Kentucky-Illinois-Tennessee League. The Dawson Springs, Kentucky team was a new addition to the league membership and only played the one season. The Kitty League folded following the 1916 season and did not return to play in 1917, remaining dormant until reforming 1922.

=== 1922–1923: Kentucky–Illinois–Tennessee League reforms ===
Dormant since 1916, the Kentucky–Illinois–Tennessee League reformed in 1922, with the Paducah Indians as a member. Paducah returned to minor league play, as the Indians rejoined the Class D level eight-team league. The Kitty League was reformed with Paducah joining the Cairo Egyptians, Fulton Railroaders, Hopkinsville Hoppers, Madisonville Miners, Mayfield Pantsmakers, Paris Travelers and Trenton Reds teams in the league. The reformed Kitty league began the season schedule with opening day games held on May 16, 1922.

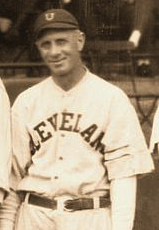
(1921) Ollie Pickering at an old-timers game at League Park. Pickering managed Paducah in the 1911 and 1922 seasons.

Eleven years after a successful stint as the Paducah manager in 1911, Ollie Pickering returned to manage the Paducah Indians team in 1922. At age 52, Pickering was strictly a manager and no longer played in games as a position player. In late June 1922, Pickering was released as manager of Paducah, so Paducah could replace him with a player/manager, a cost savings for the team. It was Pickering's final season in professional baseball as he said "I'm too old to play." After working in the local grain mills following his playing career, Pickering remained active in baseball. He created and operated the All-American Baseball School for youths age 16 and older in Vincennes, Indiana for many years.

After beginning Kitty League play on May 16, 1922, Paducah Indians had a dismal showing on the field. Paducah finished the season with a 39–73 record to end the season in last place in the eight–team league. The Paducah managers were Ollie Pickering, who was replaced during the season by Lee Fairchild, Fred Dewitt and Hoke Dillinger during the eighth-place finish, as Paducah Indians finished 34.0 games behind the Madisonville Miners in the final standings. With their eighth-place finish, Paducah did not qualify for the four-team playoffs that saw Paris win the title by defeating Mayfield in the final series.

The 1923 Paducah Indians continued Kitty league play, hoping to rebound from their last place finish the previous season.

During the 1923 season, two Paducah pitchers threw no-hit games. First, on June 3, 1923, Franklin Fort threw a no-hitter in defeating Hopkinsville 2–0 in a home game. Fort struck out 7 and walked 1 in the game. On July 30, 1923, Paducah pitcher Jake Haynes pitched a no-hitter, the second of the season for the Indians. Haynes and Paducah defeated Cairo 14–0 in the victory at Paducah. Haynes struck out 8 in the contest. Following his season with Paducah, Fort pitched from 1924 to 1926 for the Decatur Commodores of the Three-I League winning 37 games in his three seasons with Decatur, his last seasons in minor league baseball.

The Indians finished in fourth place in the final standings of the eight-team Kentucky–Illinois–Tennessee League. The Paducah Indians finished with an overall record of 55–53, playing the season under manager Dolly Stark. Paducah finished 7.0 games behind first place as the Madisonville miners won the Kittly League title, with no playoffs being held.

Due to unfortunate circumstances, the 1923 season was the final season in professional baseball for manager Dolly Stark at age 38. An infielder in his playing days, Stark had played for the Cleveland Naps (1909) and Brooklyn Dodgers (1910–1912), batting .238 in 372 career at-bats. He coached the Mississippi A&M Aggies baseball teams, (today's Mississippi State Bulldogs) to a 22–4 record in 1909. Stark was murdered on December 1, 1924. Working at a roadhouse inn in Memphis, Tennessee, that he owned and managed, Stark was shot and killed by a customer during an altercation. Stark was killed with his own gun with his wife and other patrons present. Harry Atkins was sentenced to five years in prison for manslaughter in Stark's death.

The Paducah Indians did not return to play in the 1924 Kentucky–Illinois–Tennessee League. The Kitty League reduced to become a six-team league as the Springfield Blanketmakers also did not return. The Kentucky–Illinois–Tennessee League folded after the 1924 season, before returning to play in 1935 as a six–team league.

=== 1935: Kentucky–Illinois–Tennessee League (Kitty League) again reforms ===
In late 1933, there were efforts to reform the Kitty League for the 1934 season. B.B. Hook, a local Paducah pharmacist, and owner of Hook Park in Paducah, prepared to be the owner of the Paducah team in the league. Hook purchased uniforms and equipment in anticipation of the 1934 season. However, the Kitty League did not form in 1934. Left without a league, Paducah hosted an independent semi-professional team owned by Hook called the Paducah Merchants. Hook formed a six-team league called The Little Kitty League that played on Sundays and on Holidays in 1934.

In 1935, minor league baseball returned to the city as the Paducah "Red Birds" became members of the Kentucky–Illinois–Tennessee League. The Kitty League again reformed, resuming play as a six-team Class D level league. The league's original founder, Dr. Frank Bassett of Hopkinsville, Kentucky again led the efforts to reform the league. Semi-professional teams in the area had been popular and successful in the 11 seasons between the Kitty League tenures of play.

Paducah joined the Fulton Eagles, Hopkinsville Hoppers, Jackson Generals, Lexington Giants, Portageville Pirates and Union City Greyhounds teams in the league. The "Red Birds" were so named as Paducah hoped to eventually become an affiliate of the St. Louis Cardinals, which did not occur until 1938.

George "Skin" Griffin had been the player/manager of the Paducah Merchants semi-pro team the season prior and began the season in the same role, selecting the players for the 1935 Paducah roster. During the season, Griffin signed Joe Grace, who had been playing for the semi-professional Anna, Illinois, State Hospital team. Upon joining Paducah, Griffin immediately put Grace into the leadoff spot in the batting order and Grace flourished. Griffin was fired as the Paducah manager on July 13, 1935, by owner B.B. Hooks, but he remained on the team as a player.

Fred Glass was named as the new manager to replace Griffin. Glass had been a noted minor league pitcher years earlier and was once in line to manage the 1915 Paducah team, but the Kitty League did not reform that season. On August 5, 1935, Hooks fired Fred Glass as manager as the team remained in last place. He immediately hired player Melvin Ivy to replace Glass. After the team compiled a 4–12 record under Ivy, Hooks removed Ivy as manager. E.R. Jones was vacationing in Paducah and was in the stands at a Paducah game when he was hired as manager. Jones had known many of the Paducah players from coaching American Legion baseball for many years.

Playing second base, George Griffin batted .346 in 48 games for Paducah. At age 21, manager and catcher Mel Ivy batted .226 in 36 games for Paducah in 1935. I've subsequently played two other seasons for Paducah in his career. after being hired as manager, E.R. Jones had 3 hits in 4 pinch hit at bats for Paducah while playing in his only professional games.

On September 7, 1935, Joe Grace was acquired by the Boston Braves organization from Paducah for $1,500. However Boston could not produce the money for the transaction and the sale was blocked by major league baseball commissioner Kenesaw Mountain Landis. An outfielder, Grace batted .343 with 5 home runs and 6 triples for Paducah, playing in 72 games. With his career interrupted by his military service during World War II, Joe Grace played in the major leagues for the St. Louis Browns (1938–1941, 1946) and Washington Senators (1946–1947), batting .283 with 20 home runs in his major league career.

Resuming league play and playing under the five different managers, the Red Birds ended their 1935 Kitty League season in last place. With a final record of 41–51, Paducah ended the season in sixth place, playing the season under the five managers as the Red Birds finished 9.0 games behind the first place Jackson Generals. Floyd Perryman of Paducah won the league batting title, hitting .359. The league playoffs were cancelled due to numerous roster violations of league teams.

In winning the 1935 Kitty League batting championship at age 19, Floyd Perryman was the catcher for Paducah at age 19. Playing in 82 games for the Indians, Perryman hit 4 home runs on the season, his first as a professional. Perryman later returned to play for Paducah in 1941. He played his final minor league season in 1942.

=== 1936: Kitty League pennant / Finals boycott ===
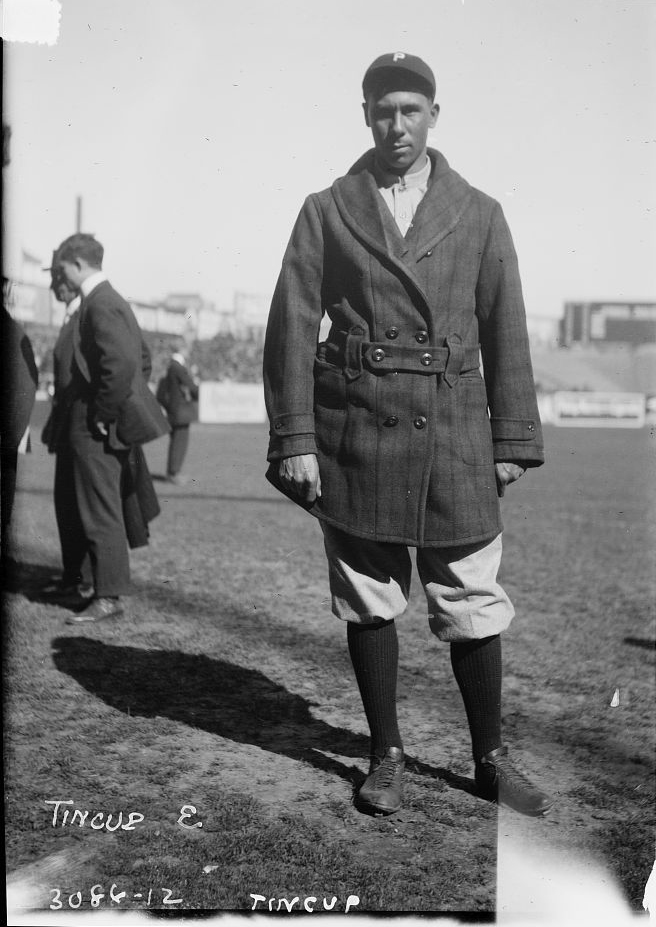
(1914) Ben Tincup, pitcher Philadelphia Phillies. Tincup managed the Paducah Indians in 1936 and 1939. His 1936 team won the Kitty League pennant. In 1939, both Tincup and his son Frank played for Paducah.

Paducah won the 1936 Kitty League pennant in a controversial season. Paducah continued league play and the 1936 Paducah "Indians" became a minor league affiliate for the first time while the Class D level Kentucky–Illinois–Tennessee League expanded. The Kitty League expanded from six team members to eight teams, adding the Fulton Eagles and Mayfield Clothiers franchises to the league. It was a successful, but controversial season for Paducah, with the team becoming a minor league affiliate of the Cincinnati Reds. Cherokee Indian Ben Tincup was hired as the Paducah manager in April 1936 and local fans insisted to call the team by its previous nickname, the Paducah "Indians."

Tincup was a pitcher in the major leagues for the Philadelphia Phillies (1914–1915, 1918) and Chicago Cubs (1928), compiling an 8–11 record with a 3.10 ERA in 48 career games. His major league career was interrupted by his service in World War I. A righthander, Tincup pitched in the minor leagues beginning in 1912 through 1942. His 1936 managerial position with Paducah was his first manager job.

On Opening Day 1936, the Indians defeated the Mayfield Clothiers, led by a strong performance from pitcher Allen Hayes.

The Paducah Indians finished their 1936 Kitty League regular season with a 73–45 record to place first, playing their pennant winning season under manager Ben Tincup. With their final regular season record, Paducah finished in a virtual tie with the Union City Greyhounds in the final standings as the two teams had the exact same record.

In the playoff series Union City was up 1 game to 0 over Paducah when controversy began as Paducah refused to play the next game of the scheduled series after a protest. On September 15, 1936, Union City won the first game of the playoff series by the score of 6–2. After the first game, Paducah claimed the Greyhounds had ineligible players on their roster. Tincup complained to the league that two Union City pitchers were ineligible and should be removed from the Union City roster. Tincup's appeal was denied by the Kitty League. Tincup further argued that all the games in Union City were to be scheduled as night games, while his team only played day games at home in Paducah, leaving Paduach at a disadvantage. That appeal was also denied by the league. Tincup told his team to play but stated that he was not going to attend the upcoming games in protest of the league's decisions. After Paducah lost Game 1 to Union City and their pitcher Larry Irvin (one of two players Tincup felt should not have been eligible to pitch), seven Paducah Indians players joined with Tincup in boycotting Game 2 of the series. Subsequently, the remainder of the series was not played. As a result, the series was forfeited to Union City. National Association president W. B. Bramham also placed Tincup and the seven Paducah players who publicly boycotted on the "ineligible list." However, the National Association penalty was lifted four months later for Tincup and his seven Paducah players. Remaining in the Cincinnati Reds organization after his 1936 season with Paducah, Tincup became the player/manager of the Peoria Reds in 1937.

Paducah pitchers Junior Thompson and Allen Hayes both won 20 games to lead the league in 1936. Joe Bestudik of Paducah hit 16 home runs to lead the Kitty League, while teammate Wayne Blackburn scored a league leading 124 runs. At age 43, player/manager Ben Tincup had a perfect 6–0 record with a 2.95 ERA pitching in 11 games for Paducah.

Playing his first professional season in 1936, second baseman, Wayne Blackburn batted .345 with 4 home runs and 82 RBIs in 116 games for the Indians. Blackburn played in the minor leagues through the 1956 season. He managed in the minor leagues through 1968 and was a Detroit Tigers coach in 1963 and 1964. He scouted for the Tigers through 1989.

Junior Thompson was signed as a 17-year-old pitcher by scout Chuck Dressen of the Cincinnati Reds and pitched his first season with the Monessen Reds of the Class D level Pennsylvania State Association in 1935. After his 20–8 season with Paducah in 1936, Junior Thompson pitched in the major leagues for the Cincinnati Reds (1939–1942) and New York Giants (1946–1947) with a 47–35 career record and a 3.26 ERA. His career was interrupted by military service during World War II in the U.S. Navy. Thompson started in Game 5 of the 1940 World Series for the champion Cincinnati Reds and had a 16–9 record for the champion Reds that season. Beginning in 1952, Junior Thompson was a scout for the New York Giants/San Francisco Giants for 40 years. He then scouted for the Cleveland Indians and Chicago Cubs before scouting for the San Diego Padres beginning in 1998 through his retirement in 2005 at the age of 88. Thompson relocated to Arizona and had a 1st row seat at Arizona Diamondbacks home games. Following his death in 2006, even though he worked for the other teams, the Diamondbacks installed a bronze plaque on the wall directly behind home plate to honor Thompson.

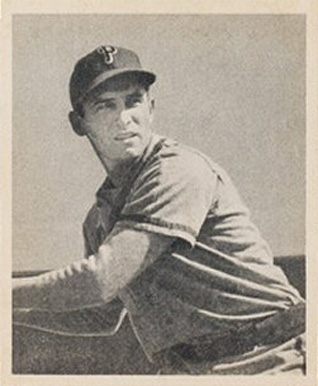
(1948) Emil Verban, Philadelphia Phillies, baseball card. Verban played for Paducah in 1936, his first professional season. He had the game-winning hit in the 1944 World Series and was a two-time major league All-Star. He is the namesake of the "Emil Verban Memorial Society," created by Chicago Cubs fans.

Second baseman Emil Verban played for the Indians in 1936, batting .276 on the season at age 20. It was his first professional season. Verban joined the Indians after participating in a tryout with the Decatur Commodores of the Three-I League. His twin sister Frances was due to be signed to play in the Milwaukee Chicks in the All-American Girls Professional Baseball League, but bad ankles ended her career. He and his sister had played baseball together on local teams following their graduation from high school in Lincoln, Illinois. Emil worked for his father's Central Shale & Excavating Company along with his brother Steve. Signed by the Cincinnati Reds organization following his tryout with Decatur, he was assigned to Paducah.

Verban became a two-time All-star in the major leagues playing with the St. Louis Cardinals (1944–1946), Philadelphia Phillies (1946–1948), Chicago Cubs (1948–1950) and Boston Braves (1950). He batted .272 with 1 home run in 853 career major league games. At 5'6' and 165 pounds, Verban was known as a fantastic fielder playing second base and was nicknamed "Antelope" by sportswriters due to his fielding skills. His one career home run occurred on September 6, 1948, and Verban had a record 2,592 major league at-bats before hitting his only career home run. Verban played for the victorious Cardinals in the 1944 World Series and was credited with an RBI single in a 3–1 victory in Game 6, an RBI that clinched the title for St. Louis over the St. Louis Browns. Following the 1950 season, Verban was demoted to the minor leagues where he played through 1952 at age 36.

In 1975, an "Emil Verban Memorial Society" was created by Chicago Cubs fans with invitation only members. Members were invited under the stipulation that they had to be a "life-long, long-suffering, die-hard follower of the Chicago Cubs and be willing to accept misfortune and misery as your inevitable fate as a baseball fan." There are no dues, no formal meetings or formal dues associated with the "club." Verban was picked as the namesake of the club as he was deemed to be the epitome of a Cubs player, "competent but obscure and typifying the work ethic." At first unsure about the club, Verban soon himself attended many gatherings of the organization, which added President Ronald Reagan as a member in 1981. Verban and his wife were invited to the White House to meet with President Reagan in 1984. Verban died in 1989, but the club has continued. As of 2010, the club had 700 members. Included as members were former Vice President Dick Cheney, former First Lady Hillary Clinton as well as Supreme Court Justices Harry Blackmun and John Paul Stevens.

=== 1937–1941: Kitty League ===
Before the 1937 season began, Paducah team owner B.B. Hook sold both the baseball team and its Hook Park home ballpark to Holland Bryan and Robert L. Myre. In defending their first-place finish the season prior, the 1937 Paducah Indians finished last in the Kentucky–Illinois–Tennessee League standings. The Kitty League continued play as an eight-team league. The Indians became a minor league affiliate of the Pittsburgh Pirates for the 1937 season. Paducah finished with a regular season record of 31–89 to place eighth in the eight–team league. With their last place finish, Paducah had six different managers during the season as the Indians ended the 1937 Kitty League regular season 42½ games behind the first place Union Greyhounds. Hugh McMullen, Erv Brame, Lee Keller, Ralph Bishop, George Block and Pete Mondino all served as managers during the season. With their last place finish, Paducah did not qualify for the four-team league playoffs, where the Mayfield Clothiers defeated Fulton in the finals to win the league championship.

At age 17, infielder Frankie Gustine played for the 1937 Indians, batting .267 in 77 games for Paducah while playing 53 games at third base. He went to have a lengthy major league career playing mostly with the Pittsburgh Pirates (1939–1948) and ending his career with the Chicago Cubs (1949) and St. Louis Browns (mlby|1950). Gustine played in the Major League Baseball All-Star Game from 1946 through 1948. Signed out of high school in Chicago, Illinois, Gustine turned down an offer to play basketball at the University of Chicago in order to sign with the Pittsburgh Pirates, who assigned him to Paducah to begin the season. After playing third base for Paducah, Gustine was promoted during the 1937 season to the Hutchinson Larks of the Class C level Western Association where he was moved to shortstop. Following his playing career, Gustine became a collegiate coach. He coached basketball at Point Park College from 1962 to 1967. He then established the school's baseball program and coached the Point Park Pioneers baseball team from 1967 to 1974, compiling a successful 103–46 record as the team's first coach.

At age 41, outfielder Bert Griffith played for the Indians in 1937. Griffith had begun his playing career in 1916 and batted .299 in the major leagues playing for the Brooklyn Robins (1922–1923) and Washington Senators (1924). Griffith is the grandfather of All-Star player and major league manager Matt Williams.

With Pete Mondino returning as the player/manager, the Paducah Indians finished in fifth place in the eight–team 1938 Kentucky–Illinois–Tennessee League. The Indians became a minor league affiliate of the St. Louis Cardinals for the 1938 season. Paducah had a final record of 66–63, as the Indians finished 10.0 games behind the first place Hopkinsville Hoppers in the regular season standings, missing the four-team Kitty League playoffs by one place in the Class D level league. The Jackson Generals won the playoff final over Hopkinsville. Augie Bergamo of Paducah won the league batting title, hitting .355. In his first professional season, Paducah pitcher Chauncey Scott had a league leading 282 strikeouts and a 20–8 record for the Indians.

An outfielder, Augie Bergamo played for Paducah in his first professional season at age 21, batting .355 with an .882 OPS in 125 games. Bergamo played in the major leagues for the St. Louis Cardinals in 1944 to 1945 and was a member of the 1944 World Series champion Cardinals team. He batted .304 with, 5 home runs, 63 RBIs, 86 runs scored, and a .400 on-base percentage in 174 career major league games.

Augie Donatelli played for Paducah in 1938, batting .211 in 10 games in his final season as a player. After his playing career, Donatelli became a major league umpire, working in the National League from 1950 to 1973.

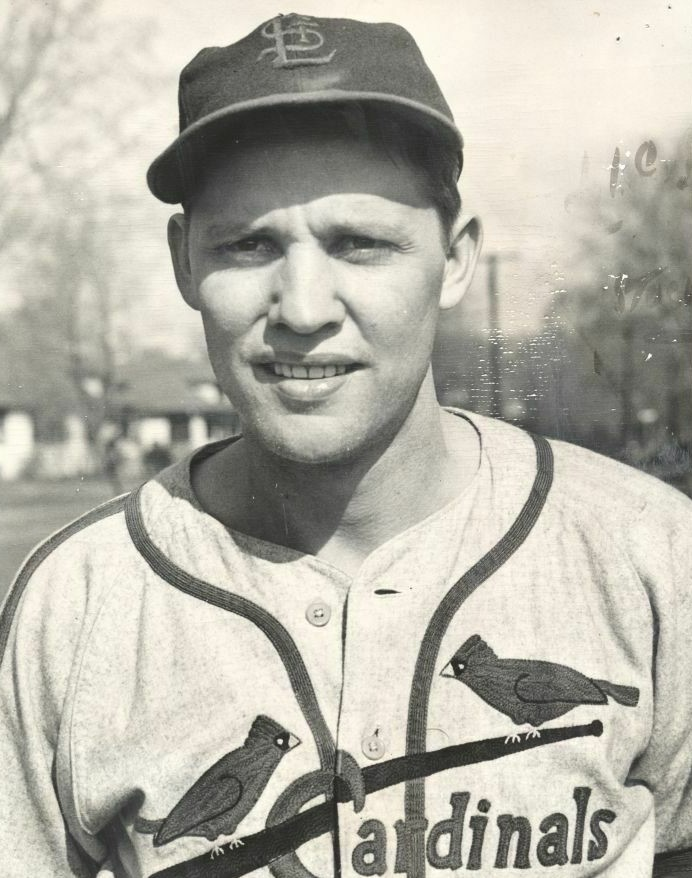
(1945) Ray Sanders, St. Louis Cardinals. Sanders batted .322 with 13 home runs for Paducah in 1938, despite suffering a broken foot. Sanders played in five World Series during his major league career.

At age 20, First baseman Ray Sanders played for Paducah in 1938 in his first professional season, batting .322 with 13 home runs and 68 RBIs in 72 games for the Indians. After graduating from high school, Sanders played softball for three years in St. Louis, where he was discovered and signed by in 1938 by St. Louis Cardinals scout Walter Shannon. He was immediately assigned to Paducah. A broken foot shortened Sanders' season with Paducah. Sanders advanced and played in the major leagues with the St. Louis Cardinals (1942–1945) and Boston Braves (1946, 1948–1949). He was a member of the 1942 and 1944 World Series champion St. Louis teams, batting .274 with 42 career home runs. Playing in five different 5 World Series, Sanders batted .275, with a .408 OPS and 2 home runs in 14 total World Series games. A heart condition prevented Sanders from serving in World War II. In 1966, he became a scout for the St. Louis Browns and later retired while residing in St. Louis.

The 1939, Paducah Indians continued play in the eight team Class D level Kentucky–Illinois–Tennessee League. as Ben Tincup returned as manager and the team became an affiliate of the Brooklyn Dodgers. Tincup returned to manage Paducah in 1938 having managed the Cincinnati Reds affiliate Muskogee Reds of the Class C level Western Association in 1938.

With Tincup managing the team, the 1939 Paducah Indians ended the Kitty League regular season with a 57–69 record and the Indians placed sixth in the eight–team league. With their sixth-place record, the Indians finished 19½ games behind the first place Mayfield Browns, missing the four–team playoffs. The Kitty League playoffs were won by the Bowling Green Barons.

At age 46, Ben Tincup and his 20-year-old son Frank Tincup both played for Paducah in 1939. It was the final season as a minor league manager for Ben Tincup and he appeared in 4 games as a pitcher for Paducah in 1939 with a 2–0 record and a 0.43 ERA. In 1940 Tincup remained with the Dodgers organization, becoming a major league coach for the Brooklyn Dodgers. He next served a scout for the Boston Braves (1946–1948), Pittsburgh Pirates (1949–1953) and Philadelphia Phillies organizations (1956–1958) before returning as a special traveling coach for the New York Yankees in 1960 and 1961. The Yankees won the World Series in both seasons 1961 World Series.

Playing first base for Paducah at age 22, John Kundla played for the Indians in 1939. Kundla played well, batting 314 with 9 home runs in 57 games. His successful season with Paducah was Kundla's only professional baseball season and occurred immediately following his graduation from the University of Minnesota. Kundla became a legendary basketball coach and led the Minneapolis Lakers to six NBA Championship titles in his tenure as coach. When the Minneapolis Lakers franchise relocated to Los Angeles in 1959, Kundla stayed in Minneapolis and coached the University of Minnesota Golden Gophers men's basketball team through 1968. John Kundla was inducted into the Naismith Basketball Hall of Fame in 1995.

Replacing Ben Tincup, Paducah manager Rip Fanning joined Paducah for the 1940 season at age 41, having managed the Bowling Green Barons to the Kitty League title the season prior. A catcher, Fanning had played for Paducah in 1922 in his first professional season.

Led by Fanning, the Paducah Indians placed second in the 1940 Kentucky–Illinois–Tennessee League. Paducah finished with a regular season record of 71–51, playing the season under manager Rip Fanning. In the overall Kitty League standings, the Indians finished just ½ game behind the first place Bowling Green Barons (71–51), Rip Fanning's former team, now managed by Mike Powers. However, with their second-place finish, Paducah did not qualify for the playoff in the eight-team, Class D level league. With the Kitty League playing a split season schedule, the Jackson Generals who finished in fourth place overall, won the first half pennant and Bowling Green won the second half pennant. Jackson then won the playoff over Bowling Green in seven games. A left-handed hitting outfielder, Roy Bueschen had a strong season for the Indians, batting .347 with 10 home runs in 124 games. Pitcher Leon Balser of Paducah led a strong Indians staff as he won 22 games on the season, one behind the league leader, Elmer Haas of Bowling Green.

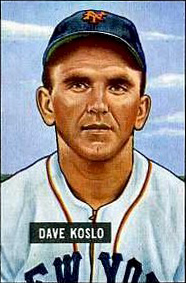
(1951) Dave Koslo, New York Giants baseball card. Koslo pitched to a 17–9 record for Paducah in 1940. Koslo later pitched 12-seasons in the major leagues and served in the U.S. Army during World War II.

Left-handed pitcher Dave Koslo played for Paducah in 1940 at age 20, compiling a 17–9 record with a 3.03 ERA in 30 games and 229 innings pitched. He also hit 2 home runs at the plate. Koslo's legal surname was Koslowski, but he shortened it for baseball on the advice of his father, as it was difficult to pronounce and spell correctly. In 1953, Koslo was named by sportswriters to the All-time Kitty League All-Star team in the 50th anniversary of the league. Koslo pitched 12 seasons in the major leagues for the New York Giants (1941–1942, 1946–1953), Baltimore Orioles (1954) and Milwaukee Braves (1954–1955) in his major league career, compiling a 92–107 record with a 3.68 ERA. Koslo's baseball career was interrupted by his service in the U.S. Army during World War II, where he served as a paratrooper and in glider-carried infantry in the 13th Airborne Division from November 1942 until December 1945. On April 18, 1947, Koslo was pitching for the New York Giants against the Brooklyn Dodgers when he gave up Jackie Robinson's first major league home run. Koslo was the winning pitcher for the New York Giants in the 1951 World Series against the New York Yankees pitching a complete game in the 5-1 Giants' victory in Game 1 of the series. Koslo led National League pitchers with a 2.50 in ERA in 1949. A native of Menasha, Wisconsin, Koslo is the namesake of Koslo Park in the city.

At age 21, pitcher Ed Wright compiled a 16–10 record for Paducah while pitching alongside Dave Koslo in the starting rotation. A righthanded pitcher, Wright had a 25–16 record in the major leagues with a 4.00 ERA pitching for the Boston Braves (1945–1948) and Philadelphia Athletics (1952).

The Paducah Indians finished in last place in the 1941 Kentucky–Illinois–Tennessee League final standings. The Kitty League played the season as an eight-team, Class D level league. The Indians finished the regular season with a 46–81 record to place eighth, ending the season 39.0 games behind the first place Jackson Generals. Both Mel Simons and Floyd Perryman managed Paducah during the season. With their last place finish, the Indians did not qualify for the four-team playoffs, won by the Hopkinsville Hoppers, who defeated Fulton 3 games to 2 in the final. After leaving Paducah, player/manager Mel Simons ended the season playing with the Bowling Green Barons at age 40.

An outfielder, Mel Simons had been the player/manager of the St. Hyacinthe Saints of the Provincial League in 1940. In his total minor league career which began in 1924, Simons compiled 3,031 total hits. Simons had played in a total of 75 games with the Chicago White Sox in 1931 and 1932, batting .268 with 0 home runs. He died in Paducah in 1974.

Paducah favorite Ben Tincup returned to the team briefly in 1941. Tincup appeared in 2 games as a pitcher and pitched 9 innings with a 0.00 ERA. He was 48 years old in his brief return to the Indians.

The Paducah Indians did not return to play in the 1942 Kentucky–Illinois–Tennessee League, as the league reduced to six teams. The Mayfield Clothiers also did not return. On June 19, 1942, the Fulton Tigers were in first place, when the Kitty League disbanded due to World War II and poor attendance. Due to the military draft, the league did not have enough available players to continue play during the War.

The Kitty League later resumed play for the 1946 season. However, the 1946 Kitty League was reformed without Paducah as a member of the eight-team Class D level league.

=== 1949–1950: Mississippi–Ohio Valley League ===
After seven seasons without a league in which to play, Paducah resumed minor league play in 1949 in a newly renamed league. As the eight-team Kitty League continued play without Paducah as a member, the Paducah "Chiefs" were formed and became charter members of the six-team, Class D level Mississippi–Ohio Valley League. Paducah's membership caused the Illinois State League to change names following the 1948 season. The Illinois State League had begun play in 1947. The Marion Indians franchise of the Illinois State League moved to Paducah, Kentucky for the 1949 season and become the Paducah Chiefs. Marion had been a minor league affiliate of the Cleveland Indians. The unaffiliated Chiefs become the only league team not based in Illinois and the Illinois State League was renamed to show its newly expanded boundaries. The Paducah Chiefs joined the Belleville Stags (New York Yankees affiliate), Centralia Cubs, Mattoon Indians, Mount Vernon Kings and West Frankfort Cardinals (St. Louis Cardinals) in the newly named league, which began its season schedule on May 8, 1949. The new Paducah team became known as the "Chiefs" because the "Indians" nickname was in already in use in the Mississippi–Ohio Valley League by the Mattoon team.

The newly formed Paducah Chiefs began play at a new ballpark, J. Polk Brooks Stadium in Paducah. The ballpark was built in 1948 by the Paducah Chiefs team owner J. Polk Brooks. Polk Brooks also served in the appointed role as the Vice President of the Mississippi-Ohio Valley League in 1949.

During the 1949 season, Paducah hosted the Mississippi-Ohio Valley League All-Star Game at J. Polk Brooks Stadium.

In their first season of membership in the new league, the 1949 Paducah Chiefs captured the Mississippi–Ohio Valley League championship despite having a losing record. The Chiefs ended their regular season schedule with a 54–65 record. Despite their losing record, Paducah qualified for the four-team league playoffs by finishing in fourth place. The Paducah Chiefs played the season under managers Caroll Peterson and Eddie Kearse, while finishing 20½ games behind the first place Centralia Cubs in the final Mississippi–Ohio Valley League regular season standings. In the first round of the four-team playoffs, Paducah defeated the West Frankfort Cardinals, sweeping the Cardinals 3 games to 0. In the final series, Paducah played against the Mattoon Indians in a best of seven series. Evenly matched, Paducah and Mattoon played all seven games with Paducah winning Game 7 to capture the league championship. Third baseman Arthur Oliver of Paducah hit a league leading 17 home runs, while his Chiefs teammate, Dick Martz had 100 RBIs, tops in the league. A left-handed hitter, Martz had 5 home runs in his 100 RBI season in 1949. Martz played in only 14 games in returning to Paducah in 1950, which proved to be his final minor league season at age 22.

As the defending Mississippi–Ohio Valley League champions, the 1950 Paducah Chiefs again qualified for the Mississippi–Ohio Valley League playoffs and advanced to the final. The 1950 Mississippi–Ohio Valley League expanded to an eight–team league, adding the Paris Lakers and Springfield Giants teams as members. The 1950 Paducah Chiefs had a 67–55 final record playing the season manager under Walter DeFreitas. The Chiefs ended the regular season in fourth place, finishing 15½ games behind the first place Centralia Sterlings. Paducah's fourth-place finish qualified the team for the four-team Mississippi–Ohio Valley League playoffs. In the first round of the playoffs, Paducah defeated the West Frankford Cardinals 3 games to 0. The Finals were scheduled to pit Paducah against Centralia, who had just defeated Mattoon in their first round series 3 games to 1. However, bad weather marred the scheduled series, and simultaneously numerous players on both teams were drafted into the military for the Korean War, so the scheduled Finals were cancelled. While drawing 47,297 fans for the season, the Paducah Chiefs led the Mississippi–Ohio Valley League in attendance by over 12,000 fans.

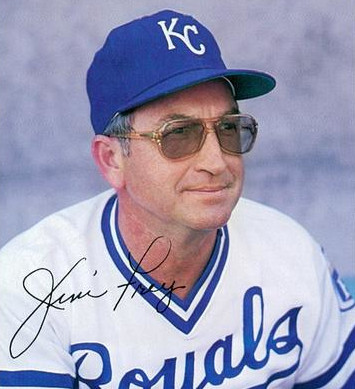
(1980) Jim Frey, manager Kansas City Royals. Frey played for Paducah in 1950 at age 19, batting .325 in his first professional season.

A lefthanded hitter, playing at age 19, outfielder Jim Frey had a strong season for Paducah in 1950. After briefly being assigned to the Evansville Braves in the Three-I League Frey was then assigned to Paducah. With the Chiefs, Frey batted .325 with 1 home run in 106 games for Paducah. It was his first professional season. Frey never advanced to the major leagues as a player and played 14 seasons in the minor leagues through age 32 before beginning his managerial career in the minors after his playing career ended. Frey was always a strong hitter and had strong spring training showings with major league teams, but a shoulder injury greatly hampered his fielding and he never reached the major leagues as a player. After serving as a coach in the major leagues with the Baltimore Orioles (1970–1979) and New York Mets (1982–1983), Frey became a major league manager with the Kansas City Royals (1980–1981) and Chicago Cubs (1984–1986). In 1980, he managed the Royals to an appearance in the 1980 World Series, where they lost to the Philadelphia Phillies. In 1984, he managed the Chicago Cubs to the Eastern Division title and their first post season appearance since 1945, earning National League Manager of the Year honors. Frey served as the general manager of the Cubs through 1991, where his manager was Don Zimmer, his former high school friend and teammate at Western Hills High School in Cleveland, Ohio.

The Paducah Chiefs did not return to play in the 1951 Mississippi–Ohio Valley League as they rejoined the Kitty League. The Class D level Mississippi–Ohio Valley League was reduced from an eight-team league to a six-team league for the 1951 season, as Paducah and the Springfield Giants did not return to the league. The league did not replace either team in the league as Paduah rejoined the Kitty League and Springfield folded.

The Mississippi–Ohio Valley League continued play, evolved and was renamed for a third time to become the Midwest League beginning in 1956. Today, the Midwest League continues play as a 16-team Class A level league featuring teams in seven states.

=== 1951–1952: Return to Kentucky–Illinois–Tennessee League ===
In leaving their membership in the Mississippi-Ohio Valley League after two seasons, the Paducah Chiefs rejoined the Kentucky–Illinois–Tennessee League in 1951. The Paducah franchise replaced the Cairo Dodgers in the Kitty League.

Paducah left their membership in the Mississippi-Ohio Valley League with the condition that all their players from their 1950 season roster were to be controlled by the league in return for allowing Paducah to leave that league and rejoin the Kitty League. Paducah owner J. Polk Brooks announced on February 24, 1951, that Paducah was rejoining the Kitty League after agreeing to the parameters for leaving the Mississippi-Ohio Valley League. Brooks announced that Bob Stanton would be the Paducah manager in 1951 after the contract of 1950 Paducah manager Walt DeFreitas was claimed by the Mississippi-Ohio Valley League, along with 10 players from the Paducah 1950 team. Brooks also announced an upcoming meeting of the teams' Board of Directors would be held at the Cobb Hotel in Paducah.

In returning to membership in the Kentucky–Illinois–Tennessee League, the Chiefs joined the Fulton Railroaders (Washington Senators affiliate), Hopkinsville Hoppers, Jackson Generals, Madisonville Miners (Chicago White Sox), Mayfield Clothiers (Pittsburgh Pirates), Owensboro Oilers and Union City Greyhounds teams in the eight-team, Class D level league. The Kitty League began its regular season schedule on May 6, 1951.

On June 9, 1951, Paducah pitcher William Howard pitched an 11-inning no hitter and lost. In a home game, Howard lost to the Fulton Railroaders 1–0 while striking out 8 and walking 5 in the contest. The 6'5" Howard had a strong season for Paducah, posting a 17–7 record with a 1.29 ERA while appearing in 30 games and 224 innings. At age 19, Howard also had 19 complete games in 23 games started. Following his dominant season with the Chiefs, Howard did not pitch in the minor leagues again until 1954 and he left baseball at age 23 after the 1955 season with a 36–27 record. Howard became a farmer in Elsberry, Missouri, where he had attended Elsberry High School.

In their first season of resuming play in their former league, Paducah qualified for the 1951 Kentucky–Illinois–Tennessee League playoffs. The unaffiliated Paducah Chiefs ended the regular season in fourth place with a 64–55 record, finishing 9.0 games behind the first place Fulton Railroaders in the eight–team league while playing the season under player/manager Robert Stanton. In the first round of the playoffs, Fulton defeated the Paducah Chiefs 3 games to 2 to advance. In the Finals, Fulton defeated Owensboro to claim the championship.

Playing at age 18, the Paducah Chiefs' left-handed hitting third baseman Russ Davis drew 131 walks while also batting .298 with 8 home runs for the Chiefs and a .363 OBP in 119 games. Davis played only two more minor league seasons in his career. His son Russ Davis was also a third baseman who played eight seasons in the major leagues.

In his final season as a player at age 34, Paducah player/manager Robert Stanton batted .248 with 0 home runs in 48 games while playing second base and third base. Joining Paducah with five seasons of managerial experience, Stanton had served as the player/manager of the West Frankfort Cardinals of the Mississippi-Ohio Valley League the prior two seasons, playing against Paducah.

The 1952 Paducah Chiefs were again managed by Robert Stanton to begin the season as the Kitty League continued play as an eight-team Class D level league. For the second time, Paducah became a minor league affiliate of the St. Louis Cardinals. The Chiefs ended the Kitty League regular season as the runner up with a 67–53 record. Robert Stanton was replaced as manager by Gregory Masson on July 17, 1952, before Stanton then returned as manager on August 6, 1952. The Fulton Lookouts won the Kentucky–Illinois–Tennessee League pennant by finishing 15½ games ahead of the second place Paducah Chiefs. In the first round of the four-team playoffs, the Madisonville Miners (a Chicago White Sox affiliate) defeated Paducah 3 games to 2 en route to the league title, as they swept the Union City Greyhounds in the finals.

Lefthanded pitcher Walter Dypko of Paducah led the Kitty League with an ERA of 2.17. Pitching at age 19, Dypko had an 11–10 record on the 1952 season in 29 games with 13 complete games. He returned to pitch for Paducah in 1953 and had a 1–4 record in his final minor league season. Dypko then served in the U.S. Army during the Korean War.

Outfielder Gene Green batted .351 for Paducah in 66 games in 1952, hitting 15 triples and 3 home runs with 18 stolen bases. It was his first season in professional baseball at age 19. Also playing catcher, Green played in the major leagues with the St. Louis Cardinals (1957–1959), Baltimore Orioles (1960), Washington Senators (1961), Cleveland Indians (1962–1963) and Cincinnati Reds (1963). Green died at age 47 in 1981.

=== 1953–1955: Two Kitty League championships ===
The 1953 Paducah Chiefs continued league play and won the Kentucky–Illinois–Tennessee League championship after sweeping the playoffs in the eight-team league. The Chiefs continued as a minor league affiliate of the St. Louis Cardinals, and were managed in their championship season by Lee Peterson. Ending with a regular season record of 67–53, Paducah Chiefs placed second in the Kitty League regular season standings, finishing in a virtual tie with the Madisonville Miners, who had the exact same record. Both teams ended the season 3.0 games behind the first place Fulton Lookouts. In the first round of the four-team Kitty League playoffs, Paducah defeated Madisonville 2 games to 0 and advanced. In the Finals, the Paducah Chiefs swept 3 games against Fulton to win the Kitty League championship, while sweeping the playoffs without a loss. Paducah player/manager Lee Peterson was a pitcher who led the Kitty League with a 2.69 ERA on the season. At age 32, Peterson had a 15–7 record on the season, pitching in 33 games with 18 starts. Paducah shortstop Douglas Young batted .318 with 20 home runs and 98 RBIs, adding a .421 OBP. Young was playing in his first professional season at age 20.

A future member of the National College Baseball Hall of Fame, catcher Bill Wilhelm played for Paducah in 1953, batting .291 with 14 home runs and 76 RBIS in 96 games at age 24. Wilhelm never advanced to the major leagues, playing his final minor league season in 1957 and he immediately began a lengthy career as a collegiate coach. From 1959 to 1993 Wilhelm was the coach of the Clemson Tigers baseball team. In his 36 seasons at Clemson, Wilhelm compiled a 1,161–536–10 record and never had a losing season. Bill Wilhelm was inducted into the National College Baseball Hall of Fame in 2011.

The 1954 Paducah Chiefs sought to defend their championship, continuing play in the eight-team, Class D level Kentucky–Illinois–Tennessee League. During the season, the Kitty League lost the Jacksonville Generals, who had an historically bad start to the season. The Generals began the season with an astounding 1–44 record and suffered 36 consecutive losses in the process. The Jacksonville franchise then folded on June 1, 1954, and were eventually replaced in the Kitty League by the Central City Reds team. The Paducah Chiefs remained as a St. Louis Cardinals affiliate, and the team had a poor showing in 1954. Paducah ended their season in seventh place overall with a 45–67 regular season record. Playing the season under returning player/manager Lee Peterson and his replacement Hal Contini, the Paducah Chiefs finished 29.0 games behind the first place Union City Dodgers in the eight–team league. The Dodgers won the playoff final over the Madisonville Miners as the league played a split season schedule in 1954.

Hal Contini had begun the 1954 season as the player/manager of the Johnson City Cardinals of the Appalachian League. With both franchises being St. Louis Cardinals affiliates, Contini and Lee Peterson literally traded places as player/managers, as Peterson joined Johnson City when Contini joined Paducah. Playing shortstop and second base for Paducah at age 37, Contini batted .323 with a .423 OBP in 56 games with the Chiefs, with only 8 total strikeouts and 38 walks.

Paducah rebounded in the 1955 season and captured the Kentucky–Illinois–Tennessee League championship in the final season of play for the league. 1955 proved to be Paducah's final season of minor league play to date, corresponding with the final season of Kitty League play. The 1955 Kitty League reduced two teams to play as a six-team league, as the Central City Reds and Hopkinsville Hoppers teams did not return. The Kitty League remained a Class D level leagu while playing the season as a six-team league. Playing again as a St. Louis Cardinals minor league affiliate, the Paducah Chiefs finished with a regular season record of 64–39, playing their season under player/manager Homer Ray Wilson. The Chiefs were in first place as the season ended. The Paducah Chiefs won the final Kitty League championship by finishing 1½ games ahead of the second place Mayfield Clothiers in the final regular season standings. The league playoffs were scheduled to be held, but were cancelled when the Mayfield, Owensboro Oilers and Union City Dodgers franchises refused to participate.

Paducah Chiefs pitcher Tom Baker led the Kitty League with 16 wins and his 16–5 record in 1955. Baker later pitched briefly for the 1963 Chicago Cubs. Paducah pitcher Darold Satchell had a 2.85 ERA, also the best in the Kitty League.

Playing second base at age 28, Paducah player/manager Ray Wilson batted .304 with a .409 OBP, adding 5 home runs, 67 RBIs and 13 stolen bases on the season. In 1956, Wilson continued as a player/manager in the St. Louis Cardinals organization, joining the Gainesville G-Men of the Class D level Florida State League.

The Kentucky–Illinois–Tennessee League permanently folded following the conclusion of the 1955 season. Following the 1955 season, Paducah, Kentucky has not hosted another minor league team.

The Paducah "Chiefs" baseball nickname was revived in 2016 by the amateur summer collegiate baseball member Paducah Chiefs team. The amateur Chiefs team began play as a member of Ohio Valley League, hosting home games at the historic Brooks Stadium.

== The ballparks ==
The early Paducah teams all played through 1923 a site that had different nicknames under the ownership of the Paducah Baseball Association. The ballfield was located at Broadway Street and Labelle Street in Paducah. The ballpark was known as Wallace Park through 1914. In 1922 and 1923 the Paducah ballpark was called League Park. The ballpark site as first called LaBelle Park before being renamed Wallace Park in 1904, when the baseball grandstands were built.

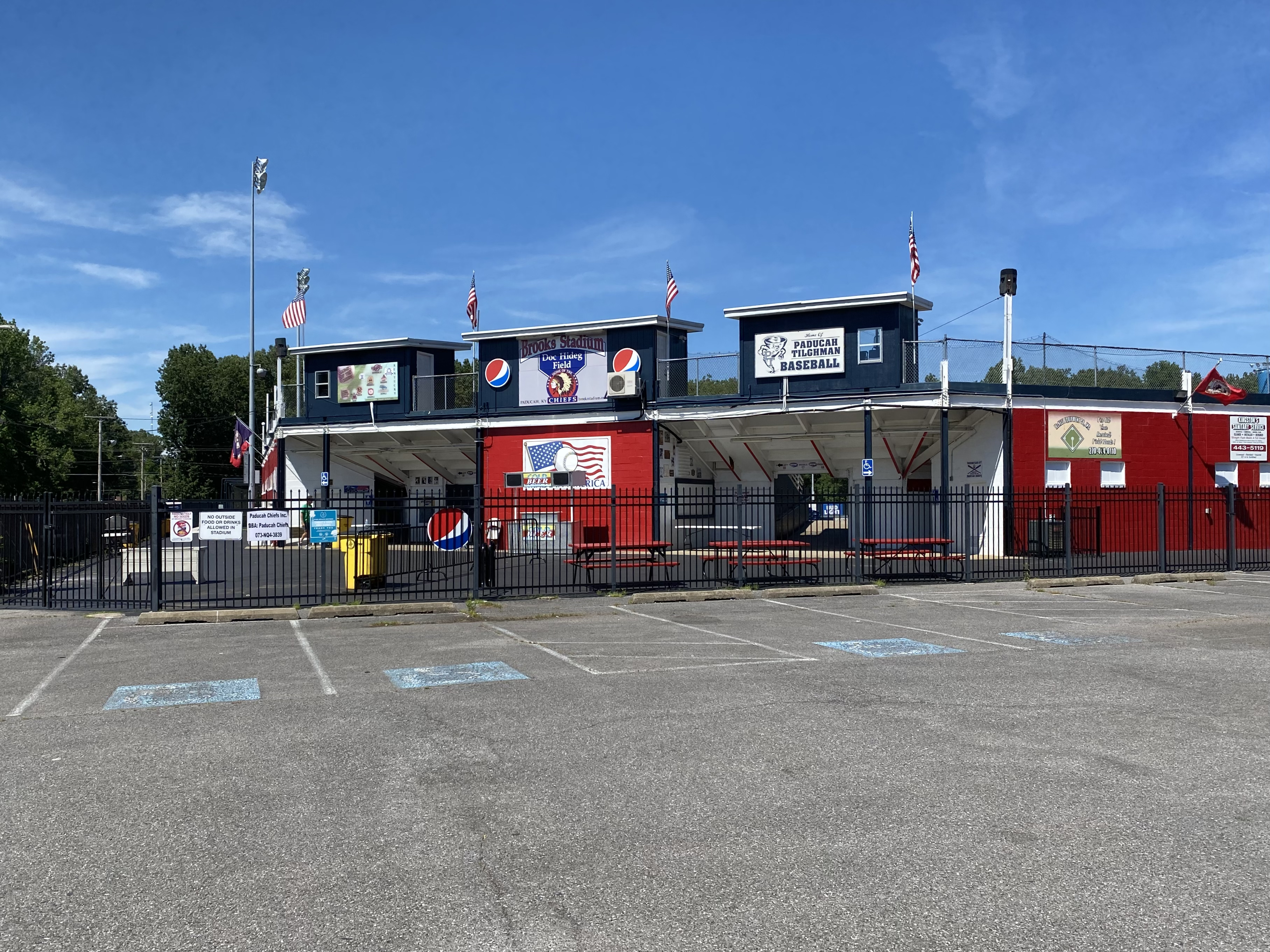
(2022) Exterior J. Polk Brooks Stadium, Paducah, Kentucky. Paducah began hosting minor league games at the ballpark in 1949.

The Paducah teams played at Hook's Park, from 1935 to 1941. The ballpark site was located at North 8th street and Terrell Street (Northwest Street), in Paducah. The ballpark was named for its owner, B.B. Hook, a local pharmacist, who also owned the Paducah team through 1937. The park opened as a baseball field on May 29, 1927. The park also hosted circuses and other events. Today, the site contains commercial property.

From 1949 to 1955 the Paducah Chiefs minor league teams played at J. Polk Brooks Stadium. The ballpark was built in 1948 by J. Polk Brooks for the minor league Paducah Chiefs. Brooks Stadium hosted the Mississippi-Ohio Valley League All-Star Game in the 1949 season. The ballpark has remained in use to this day as the baseball home for the nearby Paducah Tilghman High School. Today the ballpark is also home to the summer collegiate baseball amateur Paducah Chiefs team of Ohio Valley League. A plaque in memory of J. Polk Brooks is on display at the ballpark. Today, the facility and its usage is overseen by the Brooks Stadium Commission, as 12-person commission that meets monthly. J. Polk Brooks Stadium was located at 25th Street and C Street, with a location today of 2400 Brooks Stadium Drive in Pdaucah.

== Timeline ==
Year(s)	# Yrs.	Team	Level	League	Affiliate	Ballpark
1903	1	Paducah Chiefs	Class D	Kentucky–Illinois–Tennessee League	None	Wallace Park
1904–1906	3	Paducah Indians	Class D	Kentucky–Illinois–Tennessee League	None	Wallace Park
1910	1	Paducah Indians	Class D	Kentucky–Illinois–Tennessee League	None	Wallace Park
1911	1	Paducah Polecats	Class D	Kentucky–Illinois–Tennessee League	None	Wallace Park
1912–1913	2	Paducah Chiefs	Class D	Kentucky–Illinois–Tennessee League	None	Wallace Park
1914	1	Paducah Indians	Class D	Kentucky–Illinois–Tennessee League	None	Wallace Park
1922–1923	2	Paducah Indians	Class D	Kentucky–Illinois–Tennessee League	None	League Park
1935	1	Paducah Red Birds	Class D	Kentucky–Illinois–Tennessee League	None	Hook's Park
1936	1	Paducah Indians	Class D	Kentucky–Illinois–Tennessee League	Cincinnati Reds	Hook's Park
1937	1	Paducah Indians	Class D	Kentucky–Illinois–Tennessee League	Pittsburgh Pirates	Hook's Park
1938	1	Paducah Indians	Class D	Kentucky–Illinois–Tennessee League	St. Louis Cardinals	Hook's Park
1939	1	Paducah Indians	Class D	Kentucky–Illinois–Tennessee League	Brooklyn Dodgers	Hook's Park
1940–1941	2	Paducah Indians	Class D	Kentucky–Illinois–Tennessee League	None	Hook's Park
1949–1950	2	Paducah Chiefs	Class D	Mississippi–Ohio Valley League	None	J. Polk Brooks Stadium
1951	1	Paducah Chiefs	Class D	Kentucky–Illinois–Tennessee League	None	J. Polk Brooks Stadium
1952–1955	4	Paducah Chiefs	Class D	Kentucky–Illinois–Tennessee League	St. Louis Cardinals	J. Polk Brooks Stadium

== Year–by–year records ==
Year	Record	Finish	Manager	Playoffs
1903	47–59	5th	Sam Jackson / Roy Gage; Cooney Best	No playoffs held
1904	73–48	1st	Meredith / John Ray	No playoffs held League champions
1905	68–35	1st	Harry Lloyd	No playoffs held League champions
1906	57–69	5th	Harry Lloyd	No playoffs held
1910	55–64	3rd	Harry Cooper	Playoffs canceled
1911	58–64	5th	Harry Lloyd / Ollie Pickering	No playoffs held
1912	45–55	4th	John Nairn / Dave Anderson	No playoffs held
1913	80–47	1st	Art Brouthers	No playoffs held League champions
1914	59–65	4th	Art Brouthers / Dow Van Dine	No playoffs held
1922	39–73	8th	Ollie Pickering / Lee Fairchild; Fred Dewitt / Hoke Dillinger	No playoffs held
1923	55–53	4th	Dolly Stark	No playoffs held
1935	41–51	6th	George Griffin / Fred Glass; Melvin Ivy / E.R. Jones	Playoffs cancelled
1936	73–45	1st	Ben Tincup	Won League pennant Lost in finals
1937	31–89	8th	Hugh McMullen / Erv Brame; Lee Keller / Ralph Bishop; George Block / Pete Mondino	Did not qualify
1938	66–63	5th	Pete Mondino	Did not qualify
1939	57–69	6th	Ben Tincup	Did not qualify
1940	75–51	2nd	Rip Fanning	Did not qualify
1941	46–81	8th	Mel Simons / Floyd Perryman	Did not qualify
1949	54–65	4th	Caroll Peterson / Eddie Kearse	League champions
1950	67–55	4th	Walter DeFreitas	Won 1st round Finals cancelled
1951	64–55	4th	Robert Stanton	Lost 1st round
1952	67–53	2nd	Robert Stanton / Gregory Masson (July 17); Robert Stanton (August 6)	Lost 1st round
1953	67–53	2nd (tie)	Lee Peterson	League champions
1954	45–67	7th	Lee Peterson / Hal Contini	Did not qualify
1955	64–39	1st	Homer Ray Wilson	League champions

== Notable alumni ==
- John Kundla (1939) Inducted Naismith Basketball Hall of Fame, 1995
- Tom Baker (1955)
- Dave Bartosch (1938)
- Augie Bergamo (1938)
- Charlie Biggs (1941)
- Wayne Blackburn (1936)
- William Herschel Bobo (1923)
- Erv Brame (1937, MGR)
- Art Brouthers (1912; 1913–1914, MGR)
- Bill Burich (1939)
- Dixie Carroll (1910–1911)
- Hank DeBerry (1914)
- Fred Dewitt (1922, MGR)
- Hoke Dillinger (1922, MGR)
- Augie Donatelli (1938)
- Pete Dowling (1897)
- Jim Frey (1950)
- Ken Gables (1938)
- Joe Grace (1935)
- Gene Green (1952)
- Bert Griffith (1937)
- Lew Groh (1906)
- Frankie Gustine (1937) 3x MLB All-Star
- Cowboy Jones (1911)
- Jim Jones (1897)
- Eddie Kearse (1949, MGR)
- Fred Koenig (1952)
- Dave Koslo (1940) 1949 NL ERA Leader
- Marty Kutyna (1953)
- Grover Land (1904–1906)
- Walt Marbet (1912)
- Dutch McCall (1939)
- Jim McKnight (1955)
- Hugh McMullen (1937, MGR)
- Fred Miller (1906)
- Frank Pears (1897)
- Wiley Piatt (1905–1906)
- Ollie Pickering (1922 MGR)
- Jim Pruett (1937)
- Billy Queen (1949)
- Ray Sanders (1938)
- Mel Simons (1941, MGR)
- Dolly Stark (1923, MGR)
- Willie Sudhoff (1897)
- Hank Sweeney (1937)
- Junior Thompson (1936)
- Ben Tincup (1937; 1939, 1941 MGR)
- Harry Vahrenhorst (1905–1906)
- Emil Verban (1936) 3x MLB All-star
- Bill Wilhelm (1953)
- Ed Wright (1940)

== See also ==
- Paducah Indians players
- Paducah Chiefs players
- Paducah Polecats players
- Paducah Red Birds players
- List of St. Louis Cardinals minor league affiliates
- List of Los Angeles Dodgers minor league affiliates
- List of Pittsburgh Pirates minor league affiliates
- List of Cincinnati Reds minor league affiliates
- List of Midwest League champions
