= Fulton, Kentucky minor league baseball history =

Fulton, Kentucky minor league baseball teams
- 1911–1955; (1911, 1922–1924, 1936–1942, 1946–1955); Fulton, Kentucky

Minor league affiliations
- Class: Class D (1911, 1922–1924, 1936–1942, 1946–1955)
- League: Kentucky–Illinois–Tennessee League (1911, 1922–1924, 1936–1942, 1946–1955)

Major league affiliations
- Team: Detroit Tigers (1939–1942); Washington Senators (1948–1951)

Minor league titles
- League titles (3): 1911; 1942; 1951
- Conference titles: 1952; 1953
- Wild card berths (3): 1941; 1946; 1950

Team data
- Name: Fulton Colonels (1911); Fulton Railroaders (1922–1924); Fulton Eagles (1936–1938); Fulton Tigers (1939–1942); Fulton Bulldogs (1946); Fulton Chicks (1947–1948); Fulton Railroaders (1949–1951); Fulton Lookouts (1952–1955)
- Ballpark: High Street Park (1922–1924); Fairfield Park (1936–1942, 1946–1955)

Minor league baseball teams were based in Fulton, Kentucky in various seasons between 1911 and 1955. Fulton teams played exclusively as members of the Class D level Kentucky–Illinois–Tennessee League under differing names in five different decades, winning three league championships and two league pennants. Fulton was a minor league affiliate of the Detroit Tigers from 1939 to 1942 and Washington Senators from 1948 to 1955.

The Fulton minor league teams hosted home games at High Street Park from 1922 to 1924 and Fairfield Park between 1936 and 1955.

Today, the Fulton "Railroaders" moniker has been revived, as Fulton hosts the summer collegiate baseball team of the same name.

== History ==
=== Kentucky–Illinois–Tennessee League 1911, 1922–1924 ===
Minor league baseball began in Fulton, Kentucky when the 1911 Fulton Colonels became members of the eight–team Class D level Kentucky–Illinois–Tennessee League, known informally as the KITTY League.

In their first season of play, the Fulton Colonels finished last in the league in the first half, with a 24–39 record. In the second half, the Colonels finished with a record of 48–19 to win the standings by 11.0 games. Fulton was scheduled to play the first–half champion Hopkinsville Hoppers for the overall championship, before inclement weather and poor field conditions cancelled the series. Fulton and Hopkinsville were declared co–champions. Fulton was managed by John Jones. Fulton did not return to the league play in 1912, as the Kentucky–Illinois–Tennessee League reduced to six teams. The Fulton ballpark in 1911 is unknown.

On August 28, 1911, James Coleman of Fulton pitched a 7–inning perfect game against the Paducah Polecats in a 1–0 Fulton victory.

The 1922 Fulton returned to minor league play, as the Fulton Railroaders rejoined the Class D level Kentucky–Illinois–Tennessee League, when the league reformed. Beginning league play on May 16, 1922, Fulton finished the season with a 41–68 record to place seventh in the eight–team league. The Fulton managers were Ralph Works and Senter Rainey, as Fulton finished 30.5 games behind the Madisonville Miners in the final standings.

The Fulton use of the "Railroaders" moniker corresponds to the local railroad industry and history in Fulton, Kentucky, beginning in 1859, when construction of the Illinois Central Railroad reached Fulton. The Fulton station remains in service as a stop on the Amtrak controlled City of New Orleans route. The Fulton area is home to the Twin Cities Railroad Museum.

Fulton boasted that the city was the smallest to host minor league baseball.

The 1923 Fulton Railroaders finished a close second place in the Kentucky–Illinois–Tennessee League standings. Fulton finished with an overall record of 61–45 in a tie with the Mayfield Pantsmakers, who finished 59–43, leaving both teams 16 games above .500. However, Mayfield had a win percentage of .578 to edge out Fulton at .575, by .003. Charles Holloway managed the 1923 Railroaders.

The Fulton Railroaders finished in third place in the 1924 Kentucky–Illinois–Tennessee League. Fulton ended the season 2.0 games behind the first place Dyersburg Forked Deers in the six–team league final standings. The Railroaders finished with a record of 62–54, playing under manager Dan Grenier. The Kentucky–Illinois–Tennessee League folded after the 1924 season, before returning to play in 1935 as a six–team league.

=== Kentucky–Illinois–Tennessee League 1936–1942 ===
The 1936 Fulton Eagles rejoined the Class D level Kentucky–Illinois–Tennessee League, as the league expanded from six teams to eight teams, adding the Fulton franchise. The Eagles finished the 1936 season with a 63–56 record to place fifth under manager Kid Elberfeld. Fulton finished 10.5 games behind the first place Paducah Indians in the final standings. Clyde Batts of Fulton led the league in batting average, hitting .368 and in hits with 176.

In 1937, the Fulton Eagles reached the Kentucky–Illinois–Tennessee League Finals. With a regular season record of 64–56 to place third in the eight–team league, the Eagles finished 9.5 games behind the Union Greyhounds. In the playoffs, Fulton defeated the Hopkinsville Hoppers 3 games to 1 to advance. In the Finals, the Mayfield Clothiers defeated Fulton 4 games to 1. Herb Porter managed Fulton in 1937.

Beginning in 1937, K.P. Dalton served as president of the Fulton Baseball Association, who operated the Fulton team. Dalton served as president for 15 years, the longest tenure of any team executive in league history. Dalton served in every remaining season of play, from 1937 to 1942 and 1946 to 1955. During this tenure, the team would win four pennants, three of them consecutively (1951 to 1953).

Fulton finished in seventh place in the eight–team 1938 Kentucky–Illinois–Tennessee League. The Eagles had a final record of 55–75 under manager George Clonts. Fulton finished 21.5 games behind the first place Hopkinsville Hoppers in the regular season standings, missing the playoffs.

Fulton became a minor league affiliate of the Detroit Tigers in 1939, as the franchise continued Kentucky–Illinois–Tennessee League play under the corresponding Fulton Tigers moniker. Fulton would play four seasons as a Detroit affiliate. The Fulton Tigers ended the 1939 season with a 52–74 record. The team placed seventh in the eight–team league under manager Charlie Eckert, finishing 24.5 games behind the first place Mayfield Browns, missing the four–team playoffs.

The Fulton Tigers placed seventh in the 1940 Kentucky–Illinois–Tennessee League. Fulton finished with a regular season record of 56–70 under managers Jim Poole (46–54) and Vincent Mullen (10–16).

The Fulton Tigers qualified for the 1941 Kentucky–Illinois–Tennessee League playoffs. Fulton finished the regular season with a 68–59 record to place third, 16.0 games behind the first place Jackson Generals under returning manager Vincent Mullen. Fulton lost in 1st round of the playoffs, as the Hopkinsville Hoppers defeated Fulton 3 games to 2.

Fulton won a shortened season Kentucky–Illinois–Tennessee League championship in 1942. On June 19, 1942, the Fulton Tigers had a 30–14 and were in first place under returning manager Vincent Mullen, when the league disbanded due to World War II. Fulton finished percentage points ahead of the second place Bowling Green Barons (31–15).

=== Kentucky–Illinois–Tennessee League: 1946–1955 ===
After a league hiatus due to World War II, the 1946 Fulton Bulldogs returned as members of the Class D level Kentucky–Illinois–Tennessee League. The Fulton Bulldogs reached the Finals where they lost to the Owensboro Oilers in seven games. Fulton had a 1946 regular season record of 69–56, to place third under manager Hugh Holliday, finishing 15.5 games behind Owensboro. In the first round of the playoffs, Fulton defeated the Hopkinsville Hoppers 3 games to 1 to advance to the Finals. Fulton pitcher Bob Schultz led the Kentucky–Illinois–Tennessee League with 361 strikeouts (in 221 Innings pitched) and also led the league with 148 walks, 22 wild pitches and 29 hit batsmen.

On July 1, 1946, Tommy Thomasson of Fulton threw a no-hitter in a Kentucky–Illinois–Tennessee League game against the Clarksville Owls. Thomasson and Fulton won the game 1–0. In addition to his league leading performances, Bob Schultz also threw a no–hitter in 1946. On August 21, 1946, Schultz defeated the Union City Greyhounds 5–0 in pitching his no–hit game.

Fulton became known as the Fulton Chicks in 1947, as the franchise continued play as a member of the Class D level Kentucky–Illinois–Tennessee League. The 1947 Chicks finished the regular season with a record of 68–57. Fulton placed fifth in the eight–team league under manager Johnny Gill, finishing 9.0 games behind the first place Owensboro Oilers and 1.0 game behind the Madisonville Miners for the final playoff spot.

Fulton again placed fifth in the 1948 Kentucky–Illinois–Tennessee League, as the Chicks became a minor league affiliate of the Washington Senators. Fulton would remain as a Washington affiliate for the remainder of franchise play. The 1948 Fulton Chicks compiled a 57–68 record under managers Fred Biggs, Bud Burns and Ivan Kuester. The Chicks finished the season 27.5 games behind the first place Hopkinsville Hoppers in the final standings.

The Fulton franchise returned to the earlier moniker, as the 1949 Fulton "Railroaders" continued Kentucky–Illinois–Tennessee League play, remaining as an affiliate of the Washington Senators. The Railroaders finished with a 1949 record of 62–61 to place sixth in the eight–team league under returning manager Ivan Kuester. Fulton finished 20.5 games behind the Owwnsboro Oilers in the final standings, missing the playoffs.

The Fulton Railroaders advanced to the 1950 Kentucky–Illinois–Tennessee League Finals. Fulton had a record of 69–50 to place second in the regular standings under returning manager Ivan Kuester. Fulton ended the season 4.5 games behind the first place Mayfield Clothiers. In the playoffs, Fulton defeated the Jackson Generals 3 games to 2 to advance. Fulton was behind 1 game to 0 to Mayfield when the rest of the Finals were cancelled after bad weather.

The Fulton Railroaders were the 1951 Kentucky–Illinois–Tennessee League Champions. Fulton ended the regular season in first place with a 73–46 record, finishing 2.0 games ahead of the second place Owensboro Oilers in the eight–team league. In the playoffs, Fulton defeated the Paducah Chiefs 3 games to 2 to advance. In the Finals, Fulton swept 4 games against Owensboro to claim the championship, playing under manager Sam Lamitina.

The franchise adopted the Fulton Lookouts moniker in 1952, winning the pennant in the Kentucky–Illinois–Tennessee League. The Lookouts continued as a Washington Senators affiliate in 1952. Fulton finished the regular season in first place with a record of 82–37, playing under manager Sam Lamitina, finishing 15.5 games ahead of the second place Paducah Chiefs. In the playoffs, Fulton was defeated by the Union City Greyhounds 3 games to 2.

The Lookouts won another Kentucky–Illinois–Tennessee League pennant in 1953 under returning manager Sam Lamitina, before losing in the league final. With a regular season record of 70–50, Fulton placed first in the standings, finishing 3.0 games ahead of the second place Madisonville Miners. In the playoffs, Fulton defeated the Hopkinsville Hoppers 3 games to 1 and advanced. In the Finals, the Paducah Chiefs swept 3 games against Fulton.

In 1954, the Fulton Lookouts ended the season in second place overall with a 69–47 record. Under manager Red Mincy, Fulton finished 7.0 games behind the first place Union City Dodgers in the eight–team league.

In the final season of play, the Kentucky–Illinois–Tennessee League permanently folded following the 1955 season. In 1955, Fulton had six managers as the Fulton Lookouts finished with a regular season record of 43–66. Futon placed fifth in the six–team league, finishing 24.0 games behind the Paducah Chiefs. Fulton's managers were Ned Waldrop, Harl Pierce, Sam Lamitina, James Swiggett, Mel Simons and Robert Harmon.

Following the 1955 season, Fulton, Kentucky has not hosted another minor league team. In 2005, the "Fulton Railroaders" moniker was revived by a summer collegiate baseball team, hosted in Fulton, Kentucky, that began play as a member of the KIT League. The franchise is now a member of the Ohio Valley League, playing at Lohaus Field.

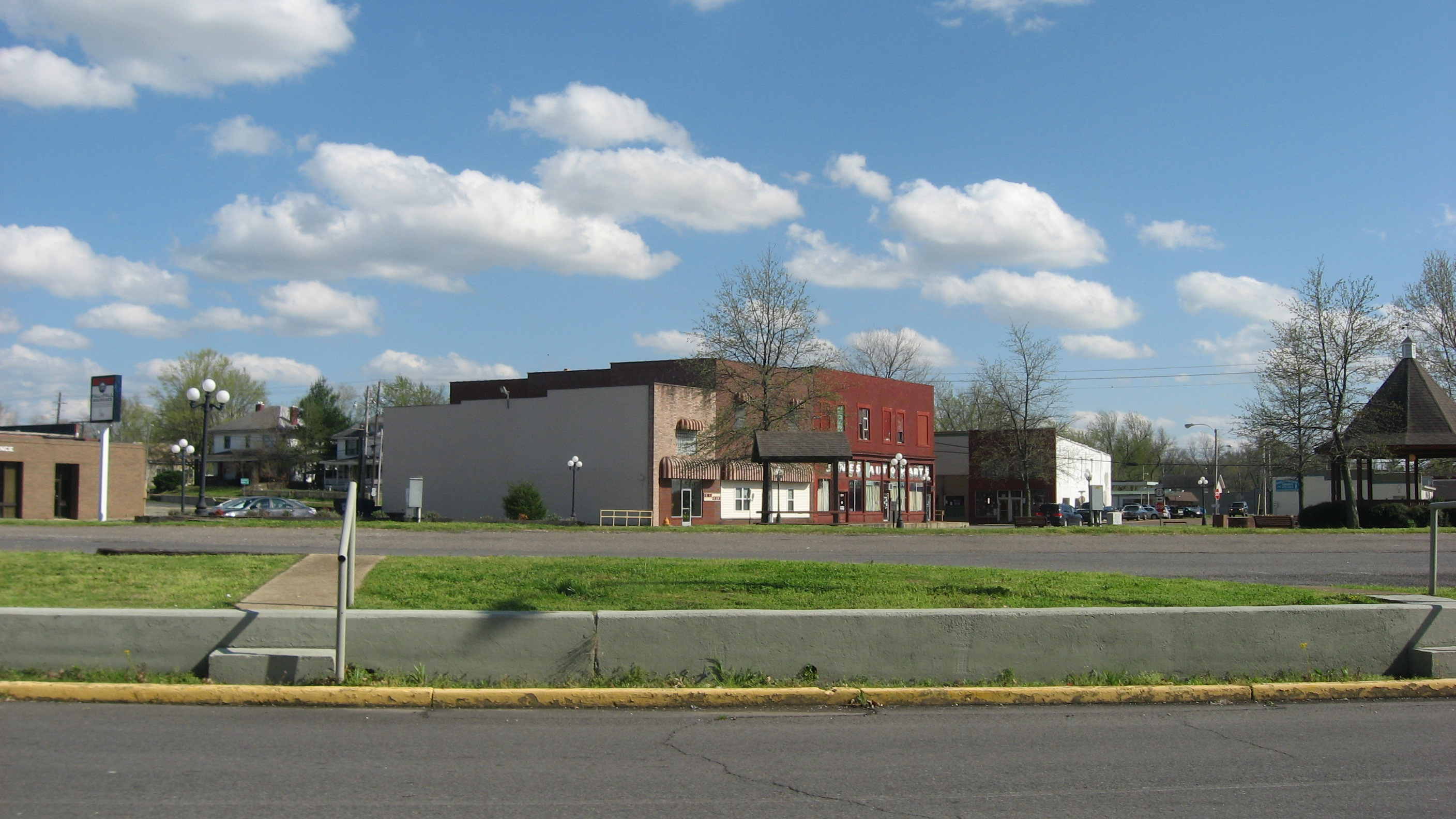
(2013) Downtown Fulton, Kentucky

== The ballparks ==
From 1922 to 1924, the Fulton Railroaders were noted to have played home minor league games at High Street Park.

Beginning in 1936, Fulton teams reportedly played home games exclusively at Fairfield Park. Known today as Lohaus Field, the ballpark is still in use as home to the current "Fulton Railroaders" summer collegiate baseball team, Fulton High School teams and youth baseball. The ballpark is adjacent to Fulton High School, located at 101 Thedford St, Fulton, Kentucky.

== Timeline ==
| Year(s) | # Yrs. | Team | Level | League | Affiliate | Ballpark |
|---|---|---|---|---|---|---|
| 1911 | 1 | Fulton Colonels | Class D | Kentucky–Illinois–Tennessee League | None | Unknown |
| 1922–1924 | 3 | Fulton Railroaders | Class D | Kentucky–Illinois–Tennessee League | None | High Street Park |
| 1936–1938 | 3 | Fulton Eagles | Class D | Kentucky–Illinois–Tennessee League | None | Fairfield Park (Lohaus Field) |
| 1939–1942 | 4 | Fulton Tigers | Class D | Kentucky–Illinois–Tennessee League | Detroit Tigers | Fairfield Park (Lohaus Field) |
| 1946 | 1 | Fulton Bulldogs | Class D | Kentucky–Illinois–Tennessee League | None | Fairfield Park (Lohaus Field) |
| 1947 | 1 | Fulton Chicks | Class D | Kentucky–Illinois–Tennessee League | None | Fairfield Park (Lohaus Field) |
| 1948 | 1 | Fulton Chicks | Class D | Kentucky–Illinois–Tennessee League | Washington Senators | Fairfield Park (Lohaus Field) |
| 1949–1951 | 3 | Fulton Railroaders | Class D | Kentucky–Illinois–Tennessee League | Washington Senators | Fairfield Park (Lohaus Field) |
| 1952–1955 | 4 | Fulton Lookouts | Class D | Kentucky–Illinois–Tennessee League | Washington Senators | Fairfield Park (Lohaus Field) |

== Year–by–year records ==
| Year | Record | Finish | Manager | Playoffs |
|---|---|---|---|---|
| 1911 | 67–58 | 2nd | John Jones/ Senter Rainey | League Co-Champions |
| 1922 | 41–68 | 7th | Ralph Works / Senter Rainey | Did not qualify |
| 1923 | 61–45 | 2nd | Charles Holloway | No playoffs held |
| 1924 | 62–54 | 3rd | Dan Griner | Did not qualify |
| 1936 | 63–56 | 5th | Kid Elberfeld | Did not qualify |
| 1937 | 64–56 | 3rd | Ned Porter | Lost League Finals |
| 1938 | 55–75 | 7th | George Clonts | Did not qualify |
| 1939 | 52–74 | 7th | Charlie Eckert | Did not qualify |
| 1940 | 56–70 | 7th | Jim Poole (46–54) / Vincent Mullen (10–16) | Did not qualify |
| 1941 | 68–59 | 3rd | Vincent Mullen | Lost in 1st round |
| 1942 | 30–14 | 1st | Vincent Mullen | League disbanded June 19; League champions |
| 1946 | 69–56 | 3rd | Hugh Holliday | Lost League Finals |
| 1947 | 68–57 | 5th | Johnny Gill | Did not qualify |
| 1948 | 57–68 | 5th | Fred Biggs / Bud Burns / Ivan Kuester | Did not qualify |
| 1949 | 62–61 | 6th | Ivan Kuester | Did not qualify |
| 1950 | 69–50 | 2nd | Ivan Kuester | Lost League Finals |
| 1951 | 73–46 | 1st | Sam Lamitina | League Champs |
| 1952 | 82–37 | 1st | Sam Lamitina | Lost in 1st round |
| 1953 | 70–50 | 1st | Sam Lamitina | Lost League Finals |
| 1954 | 69–47 | 2nd | Red Mincy | Did not qualify |
| 1955 | 43–66 | 5th | Ned Waldrop / Harl Pierce / Sam Lamitina / James Swiggett / Mel Simons / Robert Harmon | Playoffs cancelled |

== Notable alumni ==
- Bob Dustal (1955)
- Charlie Eckert (1939, MGR)
- Pete Elko (1940)
- Kid Elberfeld (1936, MGR)
- Danny Gardella (1939)
- Rufe Gentry (1940)
- Johnny Gill (1947, MGR)
- Dan Griner (1924, MGR)
- Harley Grossman (1949–1950)
- Goldie Holt (1924)
- Sam Mayer (1911)
- John McGillen (1940)
- Catfish Metkovich (1939)
- Bill Mizeur (1922)
- Ted Pawelek (1940)
- Dick Phillips (1951)
- Jim Poole (1940)
- Ned Porter (1937, MGR)
- Bob Schultz (1946)
- Mel Simons (1924)
- Mike Ulicny (1938)
- Sam Vico (1941)
- Ralph Works (1922, MGR)

== See also ==
- Fulton Eagles players
- Fulton Railroaders players
- Fulton Lookouts players
- Fulton Tigers players
- Fulton Colonets players

== External references ==
Fulton - Baseball Reference
Fulton Roalroaders current page
Fulton Railroaders 1920s team photo
1951 team photo
Lohaus Park photos
