= Central City Reds =

- 1954; Central City, Kentucky

Minor league affiliations
- Class: Class D (1954)
- League: Kentucky–Illinois–Tennessee League (1954)

Major league affiliations
- Team: None

Minor league titles
- League titles (0): None

Team data
- Name: Central City Reds (1954)
- Ballpark: Central City Municipal Park (1954)

The Central City Reds were a minor league baseball team based in Central City, Kentucky. In 1954, the Central City Reds played a partial season as members of the Class D level Kentucky–Illinois–Tennessee League, hosting home games at the Central City Municipal Park. The 1954 Jackson Generals had a record of 1–44, with 26 consecutive losses when the team was relocated to Central City during the season.

== History ==
Central City, Kentucky first hosted minor league baseball in 1954, when the Central City "Reds" became members of the eight–team Class D level Kentucky–Illinois–Tennessee League, known informally as the KITTY League. Central City joined the league during the season.

The "Reds" moniker possibly originated when the Jackson Generals played as an affiliate of the Cincinnati Reds in 1953. Cincinnati did not continue its affiliation with Jackson in the 1954, before the team moved to Central City.

Beginning the season in the 1954 Kentucky–Illinois–Tennessee League, the Jackson Generals opened the season with a 20–0 loss to the Union City Dodgers at Union City. This was the first of 26 consecutive losses. Their first win came on May 31 in the second game of a doubleheader when they defeated the Madisonville Miners, 10–2, to give the team a 1–26 record to begin the season.

Jackson's poor performance resulted in low attendance with financial loses and Jackson ultimately surrendered the franchise to the Kentucky–Illinois–Tennessee League on June 1, 1954, with a record of 1–44 (.022) on that date. A new franchise was eventually placed by the league in Central City, Kentucky, with the team beginning play as the "Central City Reds" on July 5, 1954.

After the Jackson Generals had a record of 1–44 under manager Louis Lucas when the franchise was folded on June 1, 1954, this left the league with seven teams. Central City officially joined the league on July 5, 1954, to replace Jackson, completing the second half of the Kentucky–Illinois–Tennessee League regular season schedule.

In 1954, the Central City Reds ended their portion of season with a 12–44 record, playing the remaining season under managers Joe Richardson and Hayden Ray. Combined with Jackson, the Jackson/Central City team finished 54.0 games behind the first place Union City Dodgers, with an overall record of 14–88. The Fulton Lookouts, Owensboro Oilers, Mayfield Clothiers, Madisonville Miners, Hopkinsville Hoppers and Paducah Chiefs also finished ahead of Central City in the eight–team league. Jackson and Central City combined had a total of 53 players on the team roster in 1954.

The Kentucky–Illinois–Tennessee League permanently folded following the 1955 season. The league reduced to six teams in 1955 and the Central City franchise did not return to the league.

Following the 1954 season, Central City, Kentucky has not hosted another minor league team.

== The ballpark ==
Local newspaper accounts from 1954 report the Central City Reds' home ballpark as Central City Municipal Park. It was noted that the Chicago Cubs held a tryout at the ballpark on May 21 and 22, 1954, run by scout Tony Lucadello. In their partial season of play, Central City had 1954 total home attendance of 15,203, an average of 533 per game.

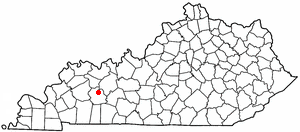
Central City, Kentucky. Map location.

== Year-by-year record ==
Year	Record	Finish	Manager	Playoffs/Notes
1954	13–44	NA	Joe Richardson / Hayden Ray	Began play July 5 Did not qualify

== Notable alumni ==
- Tommy Giordano (1954)

== External references ==
- Central City - Baseball Reference
