= List of Pittsburgh Pirates minor league affiliates =

Current Pittsburgh Pirates domestic minor league affiliate locations

The Pittsburgh Pirates farm system consists of seven Minor League Baseball affiliates across the United States and in the Dominican Republic. Four teams are owned by the major league club, while three—the Indianapolis Indians, Altoona Curve, Greensboro Grasshoppers—are independently owned.

The Pirates have been affiliated with the Double-A Altoona Curve of the Eastern League since 1999, making it the longest-running active affiliation in the organization among teams not owned by the Pirates. It is also the longest affiliation in the team's history. Their newest affiliate is the High-A Greensboro Grasshoppers of the South Atlantic League, which became a Pirates affiliate in 2019.

Geographically, Pittsburgh's closest domestic affiliate is the Altoona Curve, which are approximately 85 miles (137 km) away. Pittsburgh's furthest domestic affiliates are the Single-A Bradenton Marauders of the Florida State League and the Florida Complex League Pirates of the Rookie Florida Complex League, which play at separate facilities in Bradenton, Florida, some 907 miles (1,460 km) away.

== Current affiliates ==
The Pittsburgh Pirates farm system consists of seven minor league affiliates.

| Class | Team | League | Location | Ballpark | Affiliated |
|---|---|---|---|---|---|
| Triple-A | Indianapolis Indians | International League | Indianapolis, Indiana | Victory Field | 2005 |
| Double-A | Altoona Curve | Eastern League | Altoona, Pennsylvania | Peoples Natural Gas Field | 1999 |
| High-A | Greensboro Grasshoppers | South Atlantic League | Greensboro, North Carolina | First National Bank Field | 2019 |
| Single-A | Bradenton Marauders | Florida State League | Bradenton, Florida | LECOM Park | 2010 |
| Rookie | FCL Pirates | Florida Complex League | Bradenton, Florida | Pirate City Complex | 1969 |
| Rookie | DSL Pirates Black | Dominican Summer League | Boca Chica, Santo Domingo | Pirates Academy | 2018 |
| Rookie | DSL Pirates Gold | Dominican Summer League | Boca Chica, Santo Domingo | Pirates Academy | 2018 |

== Past affiliates ==
=== Key ===
| Season | Each year is linked to an article about that particular Pirates season. |

=== 1920–1962 ===
Minor League Baseball operated with five classes (Double-A, Class A, Class B, Class C, and Class D) from 1920 to 1935. Class A1, between Double-A and Class A, was added in 1936. The minors continued to operate with these six levels through 1945. Triple-A was established as the highest classification in 1946, and Class A1 became Double-A, with Class A through D remaining. These six levels continued through 1962. The Pacific Coast League (PCL) was reclassified from Triple-A to Open in 1952 due to the possibility of becoming a third major league. This arrangement ended following the 1957 season when the relocation of the National League's Dodgers and Giants to the West Coast ended any chance of the PCL being promoted.

| Season | Triple-A | Double-A | Class A | Class B | Class C | Class D | Ref. |
|---|---|---|---|---|---|---|---|
| 1920 | — | — | — | Wichita Falls Spudders | — | — | |
| 1921 | — | — | Wichita Falls Spudders | — | — | — | |
| 1921 | — | — | — | — | — | — | |
| 1923 | — | — | — | — | — | — | |
| 1924 | — | — | — | — | — | — | |
| 1925 | — | — | — | — | — | — | |
| 1926 | — | — | — | — | — | — | |
| 1927 | — | — | — | — | — | — | |
| 1928 | — | — | — | — | — | — | |
| 1929 | — | — | — | — | — | — | |
| 1930 | — | — | Wichita Aviators | — | — | — | |
| 1931 | — | — | — | — | — | — | |
| 1932 | — | — | Tulsa Oilers | — | — | — | |
| 1933 | — | — | Tulsa Oilers | — | — | — | |
| 1934 | — | — | Little Rock Travelers | — | Springfield Pirates | McKeesport Tubers | |
| 1935 | — | Kansas City Blues | Birmingham Barons | — | Portsmouth Pirates | — | |
| 1936 | — | — | Scranton Miners | — | Hutchinson Larks; Portsmouth Pirates | Jeannette Little Pirates; Portageville-Owensboro Pirates; Winnipeg Maroons | |
| 1937 | — | Montreal Royals | — | Savannah Indians | Hutchinson Larks | Paducah Indians | |
| 1938 | — | Montreal Royals | Knoxville Smokies (A1) | Savannah Indians | Hutchinson Larks | Carthage Pirates | |
| 1939 | — | — | Knoxville Smokies (A1) | Gadsden Pilots | Hutchinson Pirates | Carthage Pirates; Jamestown Jaguars; McKeesport Little Pirates; Valdosta Trojans | |
| 1940 | — | Syracuse Chiefs | Albany Senators | Gadsden Pilots; Harrisburg Senators | Gloversville-Johnstown Glovers; Hutchinson Pirates | Carthage Pirates; Fort Lauderdale Tarpons; London Pirates; McKeesport Little Braves / Oil City Oilers | |
| 1941 | — | — | Albany Senators | Harrisburg Senators | Hutchinson Pirates; Gloversville-Johnstown Glovers | London Pirates; Moultrie Packers; Oil City Oilers | |
| 1942 | — | — | Albany Senators | Harrisburg Senators | Hutchinson Pirates | Hornell Maples; Moultrie Packers; Oil City Oilers | |
| 1943 | — | Toronto Maple Leafs | Albany Senators | York White Roses | — | Hornell Maples | |
| 1944 | — | Toronto Maple Leafs | Albany Senators | York White Roses | — | Hornell Maples | |
| 1945 | — | — | Albany Senators | York White Roses | — | Hornell Maples; Salisbury Pirates | |
| 1946 | Hollywood Stars | Birmingham Barons | Albany Senators | Anniston Rams; Selma Cloverleafs; Yakima Stars; York White Roses | Oil City Oilers | Bartlesville Oilers; Hornell Maples; Salisbury Pirates; Tallahassee Pirates; Tallassee Indians | |
| 1947 | Indianapolis Indians | — | Albany Senators | Selma Cloverleafs; York White Roses | Fargo-Moorhead Twins; Keokuk Pirates; Riverside Dons; Uniontown Coal Barons | Bartlesville Oilers; Hornell Maples; Leesburg Pirates; Rehoboth Beach Pirates; Salisbury Pirates; Tallahassee Pirates | |
| 1948 | Indianapolis Indians | New Orleans Pelicans | Albany Senators; Fort Wayne Generals | Anderson Rebels; Davenport Pirates; Waco Pirates; York White Roses | Fargo-Moorhead Twins; Keokuk Pirates; Uniontown Coal Barons | Bartlesville Pirates; Greenville Pirates; Leesburg Pirates; New Iberia Pelicans; Rehoboth Beach Pirates; Salisbury Pirates; Santa Rosa Pirates; Tallahassee Pirates | |
| 1949 | Indianapolis Indians | New Orleans Pelicans | Albany Senators | Davenport Pirates; Waco Pirates; York White Roses | Keokuk Pirates; Modesto Reds; Uniontown Coal Barons | Bartlesville Pirates; Greenville Pirates; Salisbury Pirates; Tallahassee Pirates | |
| 1950 | Indianapolis Indians | New Orleans Pelicans | Albany Senators; Charleston Rebels | Waco Pirates; York White Roses | Hutchinson Elks; Modesto Reds | Bartlesville Pirates; Greenville Pirates; Mayfield Clothiers; Salisbury Pirates; Tallahassee Pirates | |
| 1951 | Indianapolis Indians | New Orleans Pelicans | Charleston Rebels | Burlington Bees; Waco Pirates | Butler Tigers; Hutchinson Elks; Modesto Reds | Bartlesville Pirates; Brunswick Pirates; Eugene Larks; Mayfield Clothiers; Salisbury Pirates | |
| 1952 | Hollywood Stars (Open) | New Orleans Pelicans | Charleston Rebels; Denver Bears | Burlington-Graham Pirates; Waco Pirates | Billings Mustangs; Hutchinson Elks; Modesto Reds; St. Jean Canadians | Bartlesville Pirates / Pittsburg Pirates; Batavia Clippers; Bristol Twins; Brunswick Pirates; Mayfield Clothiers | |
| 1953 | — | New Orleans Pelicans | Charleston Rebels; Denver Bears | Burlington-Graham Pirates; Waco Pirates / Longview Pirates | Billings Mustangs; Hutchinson Elks; St. Jean Canadians | Batavia Clippers; Bristol Twins; Brunswick Pirates; Dublin Irish | |
| 1954 | Hollywood Stars (Open) | New Orleans Pelicans | Denver Bears; Williamsport Grays | Burlington-Graham Pirates; Waco Pirates | Billings Mustangs; Hutchinson Elks; St. Jean Canadians | Brunswick Pirates; Clinton Pirates; Dublin Irish | |
| 1955 | Hollywood Stars (Open) | New Orleans Pelicans | Lincoln Chiefs; Williamsport Grays | Burlington-Graham Pirates; Waco Pirates | Billings Mustangs; Salinas Packers; St. Jean Canadians | Brunswick Pirates; Clinton Pirates; Dublin Irish | |
| 1956 | Hollywood Stars (Open) | New Orleans Pelicans | Lincoln Chiefs; Williamsport Grays | Kinston Eagles; Waco Pirates | Billings Mustangs; Douglas Copper Kings; Grand Forks Chiefs | Brunswick Pirates; Clinton Pirates; Dublin Irish | |
| 1957 | Columbus Jets; Hollywood Stars (Open) | — | Lincoln Chiefs | Beaumont Pirates | Douglas Copper Kings; Grand Forks Chiefs; San Jose JoSox | Clinton Pirates; Jamestown Falcons; Salem Rebels | |
| 1958 | Columbus Jets; Salt Lake City Bees | — | Lincoln Chiefs | Tri-City Braves | Douglas Copper Kings; Grand Forks Chiefs; San Jose Pirates / Las Vegas Wranglers | Clinton Pirates; Salem Rebels; San Angelo Pirates | |
| 1959 | Columbus Jets; Salt Lake City Bees | — | Columbus Pirates / Gastonia Pirates | Wilson Tobs | Grand Forks Chiefs; Idaho Falls Russets | Dubuque Packers; Salem Rebels; San Angelo Pirates / Roswell Pirates | |
| 1960 | Columbus Jets; Salt Lake City Bees | — | Savannah Pirates | Burlington Bees | Grand Forks Chiefs | Dubuque Packers; Hobbs Pirates; Kingsport Pirates | |
| 1961 | Columbus Jets | — | Asheville Tourists | Burlington Bees | Grand Forks Chiefs | Batavia Pirates; Hobbs Pirates; Kingsport Pirates; Shelby Colonels | |
| 1962 | Columbus Jets | — | Asheville Tourists | Kinston Eagles | Grand Forks Chiefs | Batavia Pirates; Burlington Bees; Kingsport Pirates | |

=== 1963–1989 ===
Prior to the 1963 season, Major League Baseball (MLB) initiated a reorganization of Minor League Baseball that resulted in a reduction from six classes to four (Triple-A, Double-A, Class A, and Rookie) in response to the general decline of the minors throughout the 1950s and early-1960s when leagues and teams folded due to shrinking attendance caused by baseball fans' preference for staying at home to watch MLB games on television. The only change made within the next 27 years was Class A being subdivided for the first time to form Class A Short Season in 1966.

| Season | Triple-A | Double-A | Class A | Class A Short Season | Rookie | Ref(s). |
|---|---|---|---|---|---|---|
| 1963 | Columbus Jets | Asheville Tourists | Batavia Pirates; Gastonia Pirates; Kinston Eagles; Reno Silver Sox | — | Kingsport Pirates | |
| 1964 | Columbus Jets | Asheville Tourists | Batavia Pirates; Gastonia Pirates; Kinston Eagles; Reno Silver Sox | — | Salem Rebels | |
| 1965 | Columbus Jets | Asheville Tourists | Batavia Pirates; Gastonia Pirates; Kinston Eagles | — | Salem Rebels | |
| 1966 | Columbus Jets | Asheville Tourists | Clinton Pilots; Gastonia Pirates; Raleigh Pirates | — | Salem Rebels | |
| 1967 | Columbus Jets | Macon Peaches | Clinton Pilots; Gastonia Pirates; Raleigh Pirates | — | Salem Rebels | |
| 1968 | Columbus Jets | York Pirates | Clinton Pilots; Gastonia Pirates; Salem Rebels | — | GCL Pirates | |
| 1969 | Columbus Jets | York Pirates | Gastonia Pirates; Salem Rebels | Geneva Pirates | GCL Pirates | |
| 1970 | Columbus Jets | Waterbury Pirates | Gastonia Pirates; Salem Rebels | Niagara Falls Pirates | GCL Pirates; GCL Tourists | |
| 1971 | Charleston Charlies | Waterbury Pirates | Monroe Pirates; Salem Rebels | Niagara Falls Pirates | GCL Pirates | |
| 1972 | Charleston Charlies | Sherbrooke Pirates | Gastonia Pirates; Salem Pirates | Niagara Falls Pirates | GCL Pirates | |
| 1973 | Charleston Charlies | Sherbrooke Pirates | Charleston Pirates; Salem Pirates | Niagara Falls Pirates | GCL Pirates | |
| 1974 | Charleston Charlies | Thetford Mines Pirates | Charleston Pirates; Salem Pirates | Niagara Falls Pirates | GCL Pirates | |
| 1975 | Charleston Charlies | Shreveport Captains | Charleston Pirates; Salem Pirates | Niagara Falls Pirates | GCL Pirates | |
| 1976 | Charleston Charlies | Shreveport Captains | Charleston Patriots; Salem Pirates | Niagara Falls Pirates | GCL Pirates | |
| 1977 | Columbus Clippers | Shreveport Captains | Charleston Patriots; Salem Pirates | Niagara Falls Pirates | GCL Pirates | |
| 1978 | Columbus Clippers | Shreveport Captains | Charleston Pirates; Salem Pirates | — | GCL Pirates | |
| 1979 | Portland Beavers | Buffalo Bisons | Salem Pirates; Shelby Pirates | — | GCL Pirates | |
| 1980 | Portland Beavers | Buffalo Bisons | Salem Pirates; Shelby Pirates | — | GCL Pirates | |
| 1981 | Portland Beavers | Buffalo Bisons | Alexandria Dukes; Greenwood Pirates | — | GCL Pirates | |
| 1982 | Portland Beavers | Buffalo Bisons | Alexandria Dukes; Greenwood Pirates | — | GCL Pirates | |
| 1983 | Hawaii Islanders | Lynn Sailors | Alexandria Dukes; Greenwood Pirates | Watertown Pirates | GCL Pirates | |
| 1984 | Hawaii Islanders | Nashua Pirates | Macon Pirates; Prince William Pirates | Watertown Pirates | GCL Pirates | |
| 1985 | Hawaii Islanders | Nashua Pirates | Macon Pirates; Prince William Pirates | Watertown Pirates | GCL Pirates | |
| 1986 | Hawaii Islanders | Nashua Pirates | Macon Pirates; Prince William Pirates | Watertown Pirates | GCL Pirates | |
| 1987 | Vancouver Canadians | Harrisburg Senators | Macon Pirates; Salem Buccaneers | Watertown Pirates | GCL Pirates | |
| 1988 | Buffalo Bisons | Harrisburg Senators | Augusta Pirates; Salem Buccaneers | Watertown Pirates | Princeton Pirates; GCL Pirates | |
| 1989 | Buffalo Bisons | Harrisburg Senators | Augusta Pirates; Salem Buccaneers | Welland Pirates | Princeton Pirates; GCL Pirates; DSL Pirates/Mets/Cardinals | |

=== 1990–2020 ===
Minor League Baseball operated with six classes from 1990 to 2020. In 1990, the Class A level was subdivided for a second time with the creation of Class A-Advanced. The Rookie level consisted of domestic and foreign circuits.

| Season | Triple-A | Double-A | Class A-Advanced | Class A | Class A Short Season | Rookie | Foreign Rookie | Ref(s). |
|---|---|---|---|---|---|---|---|---|
| 1990 | Buffalo Bisons | Harrisburg Senators | Salem Buccaneers | Augusta Pirates | Welland Pirates | GCL Pirates | DSL Pirates | |
| 1991 | Buffalo Bisons | Carolina Mudcats | Salem Buccaneers | Augusta Pirates | Welland Pirates | GCL Pirates | DSL Pirates | |
| 1992 | Buffalo Bisons | Carolina Mudcats | Salem Buccaneers | Augusta Pirates | Welland Pirates | GCL Pirates | DSL Pirates | |
| 1993 | Buffalo Bisons | Carolina Mudcats | Salem Buccaneers | Augusta Pirates | Welland Pirates | GCL Pirates | DSL Pirates | |
| 1994 | Buffalo Bisons | Carolina Mudcats | Salem Buccaneers | Augusta GreenJackets | Welland Pirates | GCL Pirates | DSL Pirates | |
| 1995 | Calgary Cannons | Carolina Mudcats | Lynchburg Hillcats | Augusta GreenJackets | Erie SeaWolves | GCL Pirates | DSL Pirates | |
| 1996 | Calgary Cannons | Carolina Mudcats | Lynchburg Hillcats | Augusta GreenJackets | Erie SeaWolves | GCL Pirates | DSL Pirates | |
| 1997 | Calgary Cannons | Carolina Mudcats | Lynchburg Hillcats | Augusta GreenJackets | Erie SeaWolves | GCL Pirates | DSL Pirates | |
| 1998 | Nashville Sounds | Carolina Mudcats | Lynchburg Hillcats | Augusta GreenJackets | Erie SeaWolves | GCL Pirates | DSL Pirates | |
| 1999 | Nashville Sounds | Altoona Curve | Lynchburg Hillcats | Hickory Crawdads | Williamsport Crosscutters | GCL Pirates | DSL Pirates | |
| 2000 | Nashville Sounds | Altoona Curve | Lynchburg Hillcats | Hickory Crawdads | Williamsport Crosscutters | GCL Pirates | DSL Pirates | |
| 2001 | Nashville Sounds | Altoona Curve | Lynchburg Hillcats | Hickory Crawdads | Williamsport Crosscutters | GCL Pirates | DSL Pirates | |
| 2002 | Nashville Sounds | Altoona Curve | Lynchburg Hillcats | Hickory Crawdads | Williamsport Crosscutters | GCL Pirates | DSL Pirates; VSL Chivacoa (Note: In 2002, the Pirates operated a Venezuelan Summer League team as a co-op with the San Diego Padres.) | |
| 2003 | Nashville Sounds | Altoona Curve | Lynchburg Hillcats | Hickory Crawdads | Williamsport Crosscutters | GCL Pirates | DSL Pirates; VSL Chivacoa | |
| 2004 | Nashville Sounds | Altoona Curve | Lynchburg Hillcats | Hickory Crawdads | Williamsport Crosscutters | GCL Pirates | DSL Pirates; VSL San Joaquín | |
| 2005 | Indianapolis Indians | Altoona Curve | Lynchburg Hillcats | Hickory Crawdads | Williamsport Crosscutters | GCL Pirates | DSL Pirates; VSL Pirates | |
| 2006 | Indianapolis Indians | Altoona Curve | Lynchburg Hillcats | Hickory Crawdads | Williamsport Crosscutters] | GCL Pirates | DSL Pirates; VSL Pirates | |
| 2007 | Indianapolis Indians | Altoona Curve | Lynchburg Hillcats | Hickory Crawdads | State College Spikes | GCL Pirates | DSL Pirates; VSL Pirates | |
| 2008 | Indianapolis Indians | Altoona Curve | Lynchburg Hillcats | Hickory Crawdads | State College Spikes | GCL Pirates | DSL Pirates; VSL Pirates | |
| 2009 | Indianapolis Indians | Altoona Curve | Lynchburg Hillcats | West Virginia Power | State College Spikes | GCL Pirates | DSL Pirates; VSL Pirates | |
| 2010 | Indianapolis Indians | Altoona Curve | Bradenton Marauders | West Virginia Power | State College Spikes | GCL Pirates | DSL Pirates; VSL Pirates | |
| 2011 | Indianapolis Indians | Altoona Curve | Bradenton Marauders | West Virginia Power | State College Spikes | GCL Pirates | DSL Pirates; VSL Pirates | |
| 2012 | Indianapolis Indians | Altoona Curve | Bradenton Marauders | West Virginia Power | State College Spikes | GCL Pirates | DSL Pirates 1 DSL Pirates 2 | |
| 2013 | Indianapolis Indians | Altoona Curve | Bradenton Marauders | West Virginia Power | Jamestown Jammers | GCL Pirates | DSL Pirates 1 DSL Pirates 2 | |
| 2014 | Indianapolis Indians | Altoona Curve | Bradenton Marauders | West Virginia Power | Jamestown Jammers | Bristol Pirates; GCL Pirates | DSL Pirates | |
| 2015 | Indianapolis Indians | Altoona Curve | Bradenton Marauders | West Virginia Power | West Virginia Black Bears | Bristol Pirates; GCL Pirates | DSL Pirates | |
| 2016 | Indianapolis Indians | Altoona Curve | Bradenton Marauders | West Virginia Power | West Virginia Black Bears | Bristol Pirates; GCL Pirates | DSL Pirates | |
| 2017 | Indianapolis Indians | Altoona Curve | Bradenton Marauders | West Virginia Power | West Virginia Black Bears | Bristol Pirates; GCL Pirates | DSL Pirates | |
| 2018 | Indianapolis Indians | Altoona Curve | Bradenton Marauders | West Virginia Power | West Virginia Black Bears | Bristol Pirates; GCL Pirates | DSL Pirates 1 DSL Pirates 2 | |
| 2019 | Indianapolis Indians | Altoona Curve | Bradenton Marauders | Greensboro Grasshoppers | West Virginia Black Bears | Bristol Pirates; GCL Pirates | DSL Pirates 1 DSL Pirates 2 | |
| 2020 (Note: The 2020 Minor League Baseball season was cancelled due to the COVID-19 pandemic.) | Indianapolis Indians | Altoona Curve | Bradenton Marauders | Greensboro Grasshoppers | West Virginia Black Bears | Bristol Pirates; GCL Pirates | DSL Pirates 1 DSL Pirates 2 | |

=== 2021–present ===
The current structure of Minor League Baseball is the result of an overall contraction of the system beginning with the 2021 season. Class A was reduced to two levels: High-A and Low-A. Low-A was reclassified as Single-A in 2022.

| Season | Triple-A | Double-A | High-A | Single-A | Rookie | Foreign Rookie | Ref. |
|---|---|---|---|---|---|---|---|
| 2021 | Indianapolis Indians | Altoona Curve | Greensboro Grasshoppers | Bradenton Marauders | FCL Pirates Black; FCL Pirates Gold | DSL Pirates Black; DSL Pirates Gold | |
| 2022 | Indianapolis Indians | Altoona Curve | Greensboro Grasshoppers | Bradenton Marauders | FCL Pirates | DSL Pirates Black; DSL Pirates Gold | |
| 2023 | Indianapolis Indians | Altoona Curve | Greensboro Grasshoppers | Bradenton Marauders | FCL Pirates | DSL Pirates Black; DSL Pirates Gold | |
| 2024 | Indianapolis Indians | Altoona Curve | Greensboro Grasshoppers | Bradenton Marauders | FCL Pirates | DSL Pirates Black; DSL Pirates Gold | |
| 2025 | Indianapolis Indians | Altoona Curve | Greensboro Grasshoppers | Bradenton Marauders | FCL Pirates | DSL Pirates Black; DSL Pirates Gold | |
| 2026 | Indianapolis Indians | Altoona Curve | Greensboro Grasshoppers | Bradenton Marauders | FCL Pirates | DSL Pirates Black; DSL Pirates Gold | |
