= Art Brouthers =

American baseball player (1882-1959)

- Third baseman
- Born: November 25, 1882; Montgomery, Alabama, U.S.
- Died: September 28, 1959 (aged 76); Charleston, South Carolina, U.S.
- Batted: Right Threw: Right

MLB debut
- April 14, 1906, for the Philadelphia Athletics

Last MLB appearance
- June 23, 1906, for the Philadelphia Athletics

MLB statistics
- Batting average: .208
- Home runs: 0
- Runs batted in: 14
- Stats at Baseball Reference

Teams
- Philadelphia Athletics (1906)

Arthur Henry Brouthers (November 25, 1882 – September 28, 1959) was an American professional baseball player.

Brouthers was a third baseman in the major leagues for one season with the 1906 Philadelphia Athletics. For his career, he compiled a .208 batting average in 144 at-bats, with 14 runs batted in.

Brouthers began his professional career in 1902 with the Shreveport Giants and played in 13 minor league seasons. He was the player/manager for the Class D level Paducah Indians of the Kitty League in 1913 and 1914. Brouthers then moved in the same role to the Class C level Augusta Tourists of the South Atlantic League in his final season of 1915.

He was born in Montgomery, Alabama and later died in Charleston, South Carolina at the age of 76.
