= Harley Dillinger =

American baseball player (1894-1959)

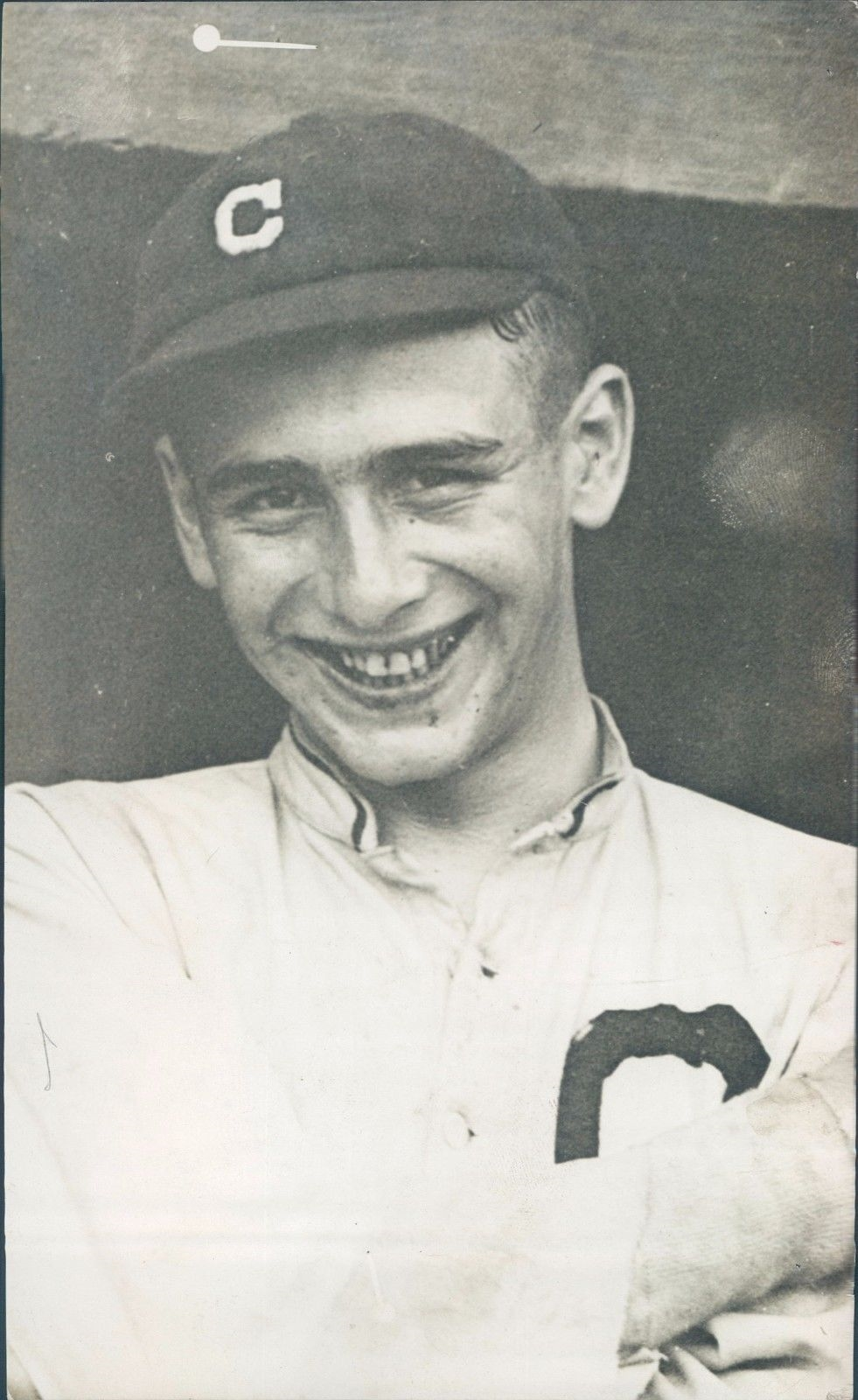
- Pitcher
- Born: October 30, 1894; Pomeroy, Ohio, U.S.
- Died: January 8, 1959 (aged 64); Cleveland, Ohio, U.S.
- Batted: Right Threw: Left

MLB debut
- August 16, 1914, for the Cleveland Naps

Last MLB appearance
- October 3, 1914, for the Cleveland Naps

MLB statistics
- Win–loss record: 0-1
- Strikeouts: 11
- Earned run average: 4.54
- Stats at Baseball Reference

Teams
- Cleveland Naps (1914)

Harley Hugh Dillinger (October 30, 1894 – January 8, 1959), nicknamed "Hoke", was an American Major League Baseball pitcher who played for one season. He played for the Cleveland Naps from August 16, 1914, to October 3, 1914. He went to school at the University of Rio Grande and later managed the Paducah Indians of the Kentucky–Illinois–Tennessee League for part of the 1922 season.
