= Fred Dewitt =

American baseball player

- First baseman
- Born: October 19, 1900; Elkville, Illinois, U.S.
- Died: June 11, 1962 (aged 61); Chicago, Illinois, U.S.

Negro league baseball debut
- 1927, for the Kansas City Monarchs

Last appearance
- 1929, for the Memphis Red Sox

Teams
- Kansas City Monarchs (1927); Cleveland Tigers (1928); Memphis Red Sox (1929)

Fred Dewitt (October 19, 1900 – June 11, 1962) was an American Negro league baseball first baseman in the 1920s.

A native of Elkville, Illinois, Dewitt attended Wilberforce University. He played for the Kansas City Monarchs in 1927, and went on to play for the Cleveland Tigers the following season and the Memphis Red Sox in 1929. Dewitt died in Chicago, Illinois in 1962 at age 61.
