= Hugh McMullen =

American baseball player (1901–1986)

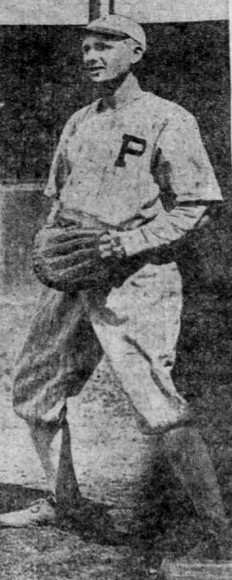
- Catcher
- Born: December 16, 1901; La Cygne, Kansas, U.S.
- Died: May 23, 1986 (aged 84); Whittier, California, U.S.
- Batted: Both Threw: Right

MLB debut
- September 19, 1925, for the New York Giants

Last MLB appearance
- April 20, 1929, for the Cincinnati Reds

MLB statistics
- Batting average: .176
- Home runs: 0
- Runs batted in: 6
- Stats at Baseball Reference

Teams
- New York Giants (1925–1926); Washington Senators (1928); Cincinnati Reds (1929)

Hugh Raphael McMullen (December 16, 1901 – May 23, 1986) was an American Major League Baseball catcher. McMullen played for the New York Giants in 1925 and 1926, the Washington Senators in 1928, and the Cincinnati Reds in 1929.

McMullen was interred at Rose Hills Memorial Park.
