= Erv Brame =

American baseball player (1901–1949)

- Pitcher
- Born: October 12, 1901; Big Rock, Tennessee, U.S.
- Died: November 22, 1949 (aged 48); Hopkinsville, Kentucky, U.S.
- Batted: Left Threw: Right

MLB debut
- April 14, 1928, for the Pittsburgh Pirates

Last MLB appearance
- September 23, 1932, for the Pittsburgh Pirates

MLB statistics
- Win–loss record: 52–37
- Earned run average: 4.76
- Strikeouts: 188
- Stats at Baseball Reference

Teams
- Pittsburgh Pirates (1928–1932)

Ervin Bechham Brame (October 12, 1901 – November 22, 1949) was an American pitcher for the Pittsburgh Pirates. He threw right-handed and batted left-handed. Brame was 6'2" and weighed 190 pounds.

== Major league career ==
His first game in the major leagues was on April 14, 1928. He played for the Pittsburgh Pirates from 1928 to 1932. Brame pitched in 142 games, started 92 of them, and had 62 complete games. His lifetime record was 52–37 with a 4.76 ERA. He was a good hitting pitcher, posting a .306 batting average (121-for-396) with 43 runs, 21 doubles, 8 home runs and 75 RBI.

=== 1929–1930 ===
Young Brame hurled Pittsburgh to a 5–2 victory over the St. Louis Cardinals on May 28, 1929. The Pirates swept the series and had won seven straight games. In 1930 Brame pitched against the Chicago Cubs in a crucial game for the Cubs playoff hopes. He surrendered the 35th home run hit by Hack Wilson but endured the outburst. The Pirates 12–8 win on August 3, 1930, threatened the Cubs chances of catching the Brooklyn Dodgers. In a September game with Chicago Brame was the final pitcher of three in a 9-7 Pittsburgh win at Wrigley Field. Right-hander Glenn Spencer started and was relieved first by Charlie Wood.

=== 1931–1932 ===
In April 1931 Heine Meine was selected by Jewel Ens to pitch against the Cubs, when both Brame and Remy Kremer were ill. On May 28 Brame was driven from the mound in the 3rd inning by a four-run St. Louis outburst. He was saved by an Eddie Phillips (MLB catcher) grand slam which gave Pittsburgh an 11–8 victory. The game was called after seven innings to allow the Pirates to catch a train home from St. Louis. Brame and Bob Osborne were victims of a home run and two singles by mound opponent Freddie Fitzsimmons of the New York Giants, on June 20. The doubleheader sweep at the Polo Grounds brought the Giants to within two games of the first place Cardinals. Brame pitched 50 and 2/3 innings in 1932, in 23 games. His batting average was .250.

== 1933–1934 minor leagues ==
Brame was sent by the Pirates to the Toronto Maple Leafs on February 14, 1933. He was released outright. He pitched for the Portland Beavers in 1934. On July 31 he preserved the Beavers' 6–2 win over the Sacramento Solons.
