= Eddie Kearse =

American baseball player (1916–1968)

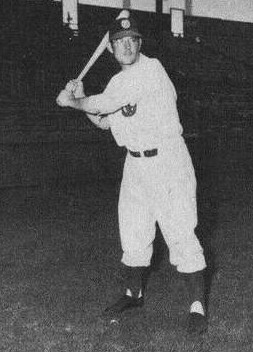
- Kearse in 1947
- Catcher
- Born: February 23, 1916; San Francisco, California, U.S.
- Died: July 15, 1968 (aged 52); Eureka, California, U.S.
- Batted: Right Threw: Right

MLB debut
- June 13, 1942, for the New York Yankees

Last MLB appearance
- July 5, 1942, for the New York Yankees

MLB statistics
- Batting average: .192
- Home runs: 0
- Runs batted in: 2
- Stats at Baseball Reference

Teams
- New York Yankees (1942)

Paul Edward Kearse (February 23, 1916 – July 15, 1968) was an American professional baseball player. Nicknamed "Truck", he played in Major League Baseball as a catcher for the New York Yankees in 1942. In 11 career games, he had 5 hits in 26 at-bats. He batted and threw right-handed.

Kearse was born in San Francisco, California, and died in Eureka, California.
