= Charlie Eckert =

American baseball player (1897–1986)

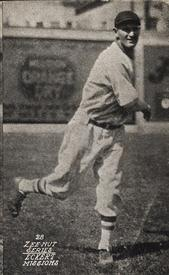
- Pitcher
- Born: August 8, 1897; Philadelphia, Pennsylvania, U.S.
- Died: August 22, 1986 (aged 89); Trevose, Pennsylvania, U.S.
- Batted: Right Threw: Right

MLB debut
- September 18, 1919, for the Philadelphia Athletics

Last MLB appearance
- August 28, 1922, for the Philadelphia Athletics

MLB statistics
- Win–loss record: 0–3
- Strikeouts: 22
- Earned run average: 4.52
- Stats at Baseball Reference

Teams
- Philadelphia Athletics (1919–20, 1922)

Charles William Eckert (August 8, 1897 – August 22, 1986), nicknamed "Buzz", was an American Major League Baseball pitcher. He played parts of three seasons, 1919, 1920 and 1922, for the Philadelphia Athletics. He continued to pitch in the minors until 1936.
