= Ben Tincup =

American baseball player (1893–1980)

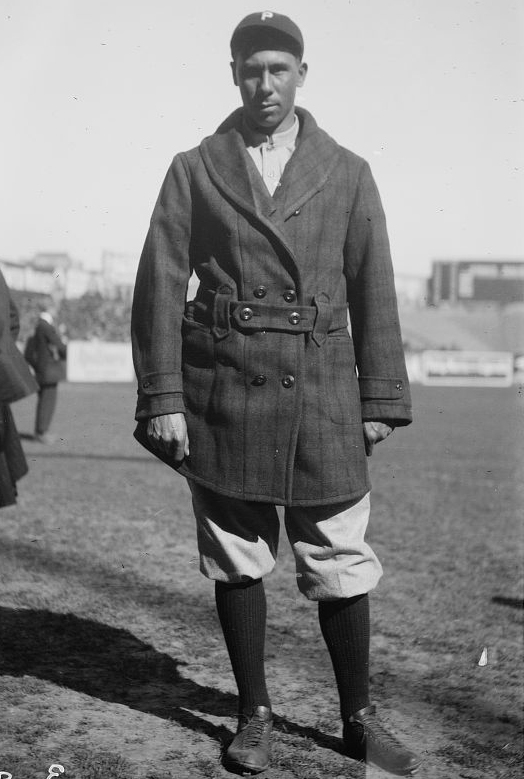
- Tincup with the Philadelphia Phillies in 1914
- Pitcher
- Born: April 14, 1893; Adair, Indian Territory
- Died: July 5, 1980 (aged 87); Claremore, Oklahoma, U.S.
- Batted: Left Threw: Right

MLB debut
- May 22, 1914, for the Philadelphia Phillies

Last MLB appearance
- September 15, 1928, for the Chicago Cubs

MLB statistics
- Win–loss record: 8–11
- Earned run average: 3.10
- Strikeouts: 127
- Stats at Baseball Reference

Teams
- Philadelphia Phillies (1914–1915, 1918); Chicago Cubs (1928)

Austin Ben Tincup (April 14, 1893 – July 5, 1980) was a pitcher in Major League Baseball from 1914 to 1928. In 1918 his career was interrupted while he served in World War I.

== Life ==
Born in Adair, Indian Territory (now Oklahoma), Tincup was a member of both the original Cherokee Nation and its modern counterpart.

== Career ==
Tincup was one of the first Native Americans to play Major League Baseball.

After his playing career, he was an umpire in the American Association (1933), a Minor League Baseball manager (1936–1939), a coach for the Brooklyn Dodgers (1940), a scout for the Boston Braves (1946–1948), Pittsburgh Pirates (1949–1953) and Philadelphia Phillies (1956–1958) and a coach for the New York Yankees (1960–1961).
