= Mel Simons =

American baseball player (1900–1974)

- Outfielder
- Born: July 1, 1900; Carlyle, Illinois, U.S.
- Died: November 10, 1974 (aged 74); Paducah, Kentucky, U.S.
- Batted: Left Threw: Right

MLB debut
- April 14, 1931, for the Chicago White Sox

Last MLB appearance
- April 20, 1932, for the Chicago White Sox

MLB statistics
- Batting average: .268
- Home runs: 0
- Runs batted in: 12
- Stats at Baseball Reference

Teams
- Chicago White Sox (1931–1932)

Melburn Ellis Simons (July 1, 1900 – November 10, 1974), nicknamed "Butch", was an American professional baseball player. He was an outfielder over parts of two seasons (1931–32) with the Chicago White Sox. For his career, he compiled a .268 batting average in 194 at-bats, with twelve runs batted in.

He was born in Carlyle, Illinois and died in Paducah, Kentucky at the age of 74.
