= Bowling Green Barons =

- 1939–1942; Bowling Green, Kentucky

Minor league affiliations
- Class: Class D (1939–1942)
- League: Kitty League (1939–1942)

Major league affiliations
- Team: Brooklyn Dodgers (1940)

Minor league titles
- League titles (1): 1939

Team data
- Name: Bowling Green Barons (1939–1942)
- Ballpark: Fairgrounds Park (1939–1942)

The Bowling Green Barons were a baseball team that represented Bowling Green, Kentucky, in the Class D Kentucky–Illinois–Tennessee League ("Kitty League") from 1939 to 1942. The franchise was purchased from the Lexington Bees of Tennessee during the off-season. The Barons were owned by a group of local investors led by Vick Smith Sr. Their home field was Fairgrounds Park.

With a roster consisting largely of players from the 1938 Lexington team, the Barons (75–51) finished in a second-place tie with the Owensboro Oilers (based in Owensboro, Kentucky) in 1939. They were managed by Innes "Rip" Fanning, another Lexington holdover. With a three-game sweep against Owensboro, they advanced to the finals of the postseason Shaughnessy playoffs against the first-place Mayfield Browns of Mayfield, Kentucky. The series was tied at two games apiece when Fanning, seeking reassurances that he would be rehired the next season and receiving none, resigned on September 14. Kitty League veteran and former major leaguer Herbert "Dutch" Welch took over the reins and led Bowling Green to the Shaughnessy title, four games to two.
