= Liberty Technology Magnet High School =

Coordinates: 35.675929°N 88.761262°W

Location
- 3470 Ridgecrest Road Extension; Jackson, Tennessee 38305; United States

Information
- Type: Public Technology Magnet
- Established: 2003
- School district: Jackson-Madison County School System
- Principal: LaDonna Braswell
- Teaching staff: 35.33 (FTE)
- Grades: 9-12
- Enrollment: 549 (2022-2023)
- Student to teacher ratio: 15.54
- Colors: Burgundy and silver
- Nickname: Crusaders
- Rival: Northside High School
- Website: lhs.jmcss.org

Liberty Technology Magnet High School is a public magnet high school located in Jackson, Tennessee. It opened to students in August 2003. It is a part of the Jackson-Madison County School System.

== History ==
Liberty Technology Magnet High School is one of the youngest high schools in the Jackson-Madison County area. Its construction took place between 2002 and 2003. The cost for the school's construction was nearly $16 million. In 2009, Liberty became a Title I school.

== Campus ==
Liberty's campus is 175,000 sq ft (16,300 m^{2}). and covers 48 acres (190,000 m^{2}), located near The Ballpark at Jackson. The outside campus includes a football stadium, football practice field, band practice field, a soccer field, and both baseball and softball fields. The football stadium is surrounded by a track and can seat up to 1,600 people. The auditorium seats up to 999 people, and the gymnasium has a capacity of 2,150.

== Classes ==
Liberty uses block scheduling, with classes typically lasting 90 minutes, as opposed to the 45 minute classes used conventionally by schools in the United States.

In 2009, Liberty Technology Magnet High School had 15 students for every full-time equivalent teacher. The Tennessee average is 15 students per full-time equivalent teacher.

== Athletics ==
Liberty won a TSSAA class 2A basketball state championship in 2005–2006.

== Notable alumni ==
- Kendall Anthony (born 1993), basketball player in the Israeli National League
