= Jerry Gist =

Mayor of Jackson, Tennessee from 2007 to 2019

Mayor of Jackson, Tennessee
- In office 2007-2019
- Preceded by: Charles H. Farmer
- Succeeded by: Scott Conger

Personal details
- Born: Scottsboro, Alabama
- Party: Independent
- Spouse: Liz Barnes Gist
- Education: Springfield College (MPA)

Jerry Gist is an American politician who served as the 34th Mayor of Jackson, Tennessee, from 2007 to 2019. Though Jackson's municipal elections are nonpartisan, Gist identified as an Independent.

== Early life and education ==
Gist was born and raised in Scottsboro, Alabama. His father worked in local government, and his brother, Roy Gist, served in the Alabama legislature. Gist graduated from Scottsboro High School in 1960 and attended Jacksonville State University for one year before working at Redstone Arsenal in Huntsville, Alabama.

He later served about two years in the U.S. Army, spending much of that time stationed in Germany. After returning to civilian life, he earned a bachelor's degree in education with an emphasis in physical education and recreation, and later a Master's degree in public administration from Springfield College in Massachusetts. He also completed a public leadership program at Harvard's Kennedy School of Government.

== Career ==
Gist began his public service career in 1971 as Director of Parks and Recreation in Gainesville, Georgia. In 1977, he became executive director of Recreation and Parks for the City of Jackson, Tennessee, and in 1991 he was appointed executive director of Public Works, overseeing departments including parks, streets, sanitation, and planning.

In 2002, Gist resigned from his appointed role to run for County Mayor of Madison County, Tennessee, winning election as an Independent. In 2007, he was elected Mayor of Jackson and took office on July 1 of that year. He served three terms, leaving office in 2019.

As mayor, Gist focused on infrastructure, health and wellness initiatives, and downtown redevelopment. His administration secured federal and state funding for a planned southern bypass project (U.S. 45 South Bypass) and oversaw the city's participation in the National League of Cities' "Let's Move!" program promoting healthy lifestyles. During his tenure, Jackson also redeveloped the former Lambuth University campus for community and educational use.

== Personal life ==
Gist is married to his childhood sweetheart, Liz Barnes Gist. They have two children and several grandchildren.
