= Wil Masoud =

American football player (born 1991)

No. 16
- Position: Quarterback

Personal information
- Born: June 12, 1991 (age 35); Medon, Tennessee, U.S.
- Listed height: 6 ft 6 in (1.98 m)
- Listed weight: 230 lb (104 kg)

Career information
- High school: South Side (Jackson, Tennessee)
- College: Bethel (TN)
- NFL draft: 2013: undrafted

Career history
- Columbus Lions (2013)*; Orlando Predators (2014)
- * Offseason or practice squad member only

Career AFL statistics
- Comp. / Att.: 11 / 21
- Passing yards: 122
- TD–INT: 1–1
- QB rating: 62.00
- Rushing TD: 0
- Stats at ArenaFan.com

Wilson Masoud (born June 12, 1991) is an American former professional football quarterback.

== Football career ==
Masoud played college football at Bethel University. He was invited to mini camp with the New York Giants as an undrafted free agent in 2013.
