= South Side High School (Jackson, Tennessee) =

Coordinates: 35.569°N 88.813°W

Location
- 84 Harts Bridge Road; Jackson, (Madison County), Tennessee 38301; United States

Information
- Type: Public high school
- Principal: Dr. Shari Baldwin
- Staff: 66.85 (FTE)
- Enrollment: 773 (2023-2024)
- Student to teacher ratio: 11.56
- Colors: Black and white
- Nickname: Hawks

South Side High School in Jackson, Tennessee is a public high school, part of the Jackson-Madison County School System school system. It was created in 1956 by the consolidation of Pinson High School, Malesus High School, J.B. Young High School and Mercer High School. In 1992 they absorbed the students of West High School (Jackson, Tennessee) when it was abolished as part of the merger of the Jackson and Madison County school systems.

== Notable people ==
Alumni

- Jabari Greer, former professional football player
- Wil Masoud, professional football player

Faculty

- Joe McKnight, Tennessee state senator
