= Artis Hicks =

American football player (born 1978)

No. 77 ,79, 69, 75, 73
- Position: Guard

Personal information
- Born: November 28, 1978 (age 47); Jackson, Tennessee, U.S.
- Listed height: 6 ft 4 in (1.93 m)
- Listed weight: 312 lb (142 kg)

Career information
- High school: Jackson Central-Merry
- College: Memphis
- NFL draft: 2002: undrafted

Career history
- Philadelphia Eagles (2002–2005); Minnesota Vikings (2006–2009); Washington Redskins (2010); Cleveland Browns (2011); Miami Dolphins (2012)

Career NFL statistics
- Games played: 118
- Games started: 71
- Stats at Pro Football Reference

Artis Hicks Jr. (born November 28, 1978) is an American former professional football player who was a guard in the National Football League. He played college football for the Memphis Tigers and was signed by the Philadelphia Eagles as an undrafted free agent in 2002.

Hicks also played for the Minnesota Vikings, Washington Redskins, and Cleveland Browns.

== Professional career ==
=== Philadelphia Eagles ===
Hicks signed with the Philadelphia Eagles in April 2002 as an undrafted free agent. He made the active roster for the entire 2002 season. In 2003, Hicks got his first start against the New York Giants.

In April 2004, Hicks signed a multi-year contract extension with the Eagles. He started at left guard for the 2004 season, including Super Bowl XXXIX in 2005 against the New England Patriots.

=== Minnesota Vikings ===
In April 2006, the Eagles traded Hicks to the Minnesota Vikings, where he started at right guard for the Vikings during the 2006 season.

=== Washington Redskins ===
On March 6, 2010, Hicks was signed by the Washington Redskins as a free agent. On September 3, 2011, Washington released Hicks to waivers.

=== Cleveland Browns ===
Hicks signed with the Cleveland Browns on September 4, 2011.

=== Miami Dolphins ===
Hicks signed with the Miami Dolphins on March 15, 2012. He was placed on injured reserve due to a neck injury on September 4.
