= Jackson Central-Merry Early College High School =

American public high school

Jackson Central-Merry Middle and High

Location
- 332 Lane Ave; Jackson, Tennessee 38301; United States; 35.6278°N 88.8113°W

Information
- Established: 1970 (combination of Jackson High and Merry High) it closed in 2016. Reopened in 2021.
- School district: Jackson-Madison County School District
- Superintendent: Marlon King
- Principal: Ramonica Dorsey
- Grades: 6-12
- Colors: Green and gold
- Team name: Cougars
- Website: https://jcmech.jmcss.org/

Jackson Central-Merry Middle and High School also known as (JCMMS, JCMHS, JCM 6-12 or JCM) is both a middle school and high school located in Jackson, Tennessee, United States. The school was active as a high school from 1970 to 2016, during which time it was once the largest in West Tennessee outside Memphis. The school was renovated and reopened as a middle and high school on September 20, 2021.

== History ==
The school was formed in 1970 as a consolidation of predominantly white Jackson High School and predominantly black Merry High School. It was the first integrated high school in Jackson. The former Jackson High became the new school's "west campus" and the former Merry High became the "east campus." The school initially taught students in grades 10, 11 and 12. Freshmen students were added after the Jackson city school system consolidated with the Madison County system in the early 1990s.

Three city junior high schools (later middle schools) originally fed into JCM: Tigrett Junior High School, Jackson Junior High School and Parkway Junior High School. The school mascot is the Cougar. School colors are green and gold.

In 2003, the west campus became Madison Academic Magnet High School. Jackson Central-Merry was then entirely housed on the former east campus. Oman Arena is located between both campuses.

In 2016, Jackson-Madison County Board of Education issued the "Vision 2020" plan. This plan was passed, as a result, Jackson Central-Merry High School was closed along with 4 other schools.

In 2021, Jackson-Madison County Schools reopened the school in a new building, as a middle and high school holding grades 6–12. The old building was renovated and reopened as a new magnet high school, JCM-Early College High, known by students and staff as ECH to help differentiate between the two schools. This was necessary because the new building was not fully completed, and high school students had to share some classes with ECH at the beginning of the school year.

== Jackson Central-Merry Academy of Medical Technology Magnet High School ==
JCM was awarded the High School Redesign Grant, which provided $1.5 million over a three-year period to create the Jackson Central-Merry Academy of Medical Technology Magnet High School program, which was completed in 2010.

Beginning in the 2010–2011 school year, Jackson Central-Merry High School began offering a health science magnet school program. The program was intended to help incoming freshmen become certified in a healthcare related area upon the completion of high school.

The program curriculum focused on advancing one of four fields of study:

- Therapeutic Services (Certified in Nursing assistant)
- Diagnostic Services (Certified in phlebotomy with clinical internship)
- Health Informatics
- Biotechnology Research and Development

In December 2015, the Jackson-Madison County School Board voted to close JCM after the 2015–2016 academic year. Upon its 2016 closure, the school had graduated 46 senior classes over as many academic years. In 2019, the Board began discussions to renovate and reopen the school. Instead of using the old building, a new one that was capable of holding a growing population and new equipment, was built across from the East campus building on the Royal Street side. This allowed the school system to use the smaller building for a new magnet high school, JCM-Early College High. JCM reopened in the brand new building in 2021, holding grades 6 to 12. The mascot and school colors remained as originally implemented, though they were now shared with the new magnet high school, just as the new school paid tribute to the old one by keeping their name as part of the new one. This made many people in the community happy, as they hadn't wanted JCM to close. It was seen as a way to move forward with the city's need for growth, without forgetting the rich past and the important part the school had played in the city's history.

== Notable alumni ==
- Artis Hicks —— former professional football player
- Ed Jones — former professional football player (graduated from Merry High, not JCM)
- Van Jones — political activist, former Obama administration staff member
- Matt Kisber — businessman and Democratic politician
- Al Wilson — former professional football player
- Jackie Beard — former U.S. national amateur bantamweight boxing champion (1978–80)
- Wakeema Hollis — actress and model
