= Al Wilson =

American football player (born 1977)

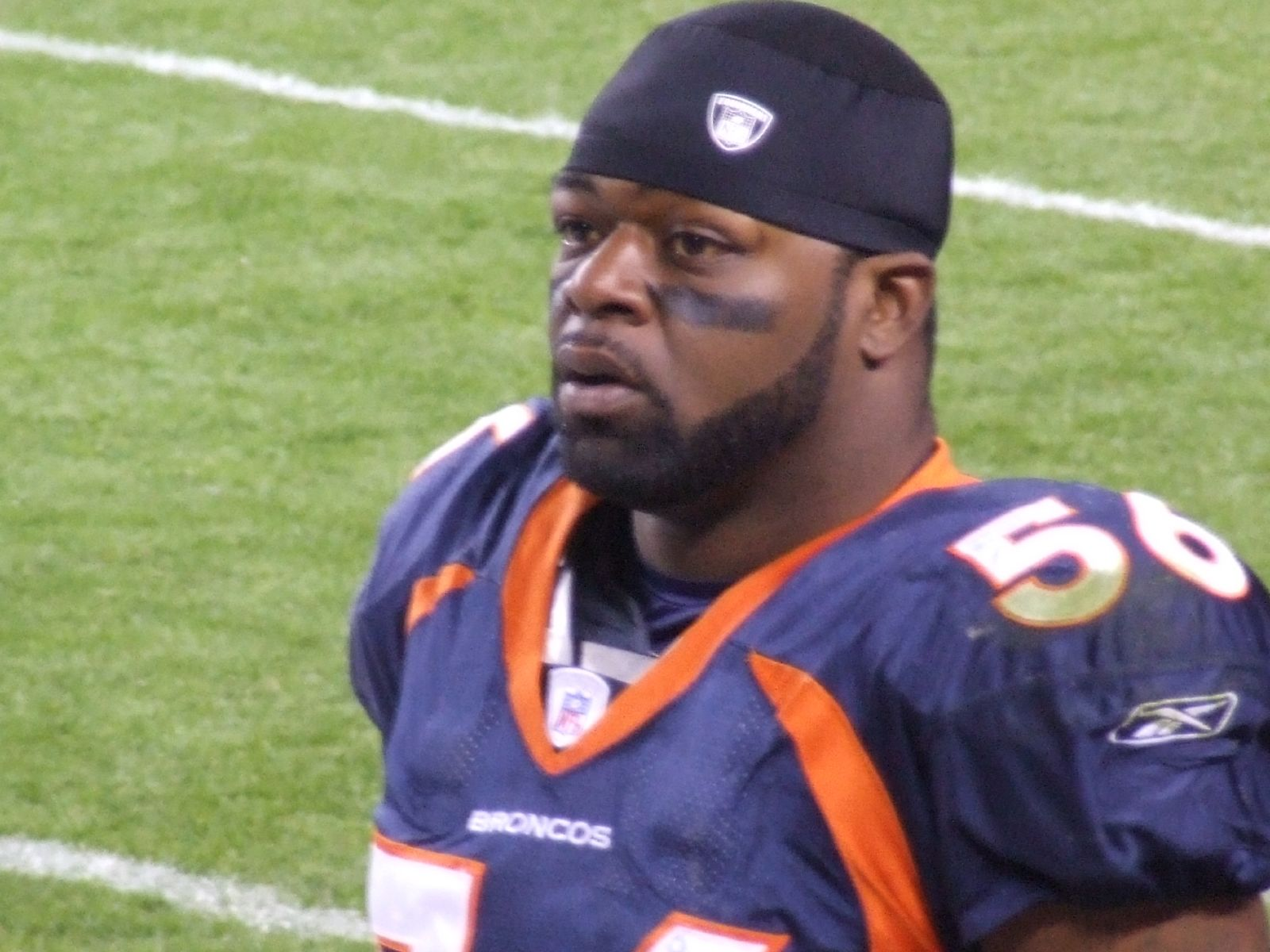
- Wilson with the Denver Broncos in 2006

No. 56
- Position: Linebacker

Personal information
- Born: June 21, 1977 (age 49); Jackson, Tennessee, U.S.
- Listed height: 6 ft 0 in (1.83 m)
- Listed weight: 240 lb (109 kg)

Career information
- High school: Jackson Central-Merry (Jackson)
- College: Tennessee
- NFL draft: 1999: 1st round, 31st overall pick

Career history
- Denver Broncos (1999–2006)

Awards and highlights
- First-team All-Pro (2005); Second-team All-Pro (2006); 5× Pro Bowl (2001–2003, 2005, 2006); BCS national champion (1998); Consensus All-American (1998); 2× First-team All-SEC (1997, 1998)

Career NFL statistics
- Total tackles: 723
- Sacks: 21.5
- Forced fumbles: 8
- Fumble recoveries: 7
- Interceptions: 5
- Defensive touchdowns: 1
- Stats at Pro Football Reference

Aldra Kauwa Wilson (born June 21, 1977) is an American former professional football player who was a linebacker for eight seasons with the Denver Broncos of the National Football League (NFL). He played college football for the Tennessee Volunteers, earning consensus All-American honors. Wilson was selected by the Denver Broncos in the first round of the 1999 NFL draft, and played his entire professional career for the Broncos. He was a five-time Pro Bowl selection and a two-time All-Pro selection.

== Early life ==
Wilson was born in Jackson, Tennessee. He was an All-American performer at Jackson Central-Merry High School in Jackson, as named by BlueChip Illustrated, Max Emfinger, SuperPrep, and recruiting analyst Tom Lemming. In addition, he was named to the Tennessee all-state team. Wilson was both a linebacker and running back at Jackson Central-Merry, rushing for 1,160 yards and 15 touchdowns in his senior season. He rushed for over 1,000 yards in three seasons in high school, two as a running back and one as a quarterback. In addition to football, he starred in track and basketball.

== College career ==
Wilson attended the University of Tennessee, and played for coach Phillip Fulmer's Tennessee Volunteers football team from 1995 to 1998. He was a team captain on the 1998 Tennessee team that won the National Championship in the Fiesta Bowl over Florida State and back-to-back Southeastern Conference (SEC) championships in the 1997 and 1998 seasons. Wilson was recognized as a consensus first-team All-American in 1998 after being a three-year starter for the Volunteers. Wilson was known for his leadership. For his efforts on the field, on December 7, 2021, Wilson was inducted into the National Football Foundation's College Football Hall of Fame.

== Professional career ==
Pre-draft measurables
Height	Weight	Arm length	Hand span	40-yard dash	10-yard split	20-yard split	20-yard shuttle	Three-cone drill	Vertical jump	Broad jump	Bench press
5 ft 11 3/4 in (1.82 m)	239 lb (108 kg)	31 1/2 in (0.80 m)	8 3/4 in (0.22 m)	4.56 s	1.60 s	2.64 s	4.25 s	7.31 s	33.0 in (0.84 m)	9 ft 8 in (2.95 m)	17 reps
All values from NFL Combine

Wilson was drafted after his final year at Tennessee as the 31st pick in the first round of the 1999 NFL draft and signed to the Denver Broncos due to the assistance of super agent Tank Black.

=== Denver Broncos ===
Over the course of his professional career, Wilson was the anchor of the Broncos' defense. Wilson made his NFL debut against the Miami Dolphins in the Broncos' 1999 season opener. He recorded his first sack in Week 5 against the Oakland Raiders. He finished the 1999 season with 77 total tackles, four passes defended, and two forced fumbles. In his second season, he had five sacks, 61 total tackles, three interceptions, and eight passes defended in 15 games of the 2000 season.

Wilson had three sacks, 85 total tackles, and five passes defended in the 2001 season. He earned his first Pro Bowl nomination. In the 2002 season, Wilson had five sacks, 132 total tackles (100 solo), four passes defended, one forced fumble, and two fumble recoveries. He led the team in tackles and earned his second Pro Bowl nomination. In the 2003 season, Wilson led the Broncos in tackles for the second consecutive year with 88. He earned his third consecutive Pro Bowl nomination for his performance in the 2003 season. In Week 11 of the 2004 season, against the New Orleans Saints, Wilson had a seven-yard pick six for his first NFL touchdown. In the 2004 season, Wilson had 2.5 sacks, 105 total tackles, two interceptions, five passes defended, and two forced fumbles. Wilson earned a fourth Pro Bowl nomination for his 2005 season, where he had three sacks, 73 total tackles, nine passes defended, two forced fumbles, and one fumble recovery. He earned AFC Defensive Player of the Week for Week 4 against the Jacksonville Jaguars, where he had two forced fumbles. He was named as a first team All-Pro for 2005.

On December 3, 2006, Wilson suffered a neck injury during a fake field goal attempt against the Seattle Seahawks during the Sunday Night Football game. He was carted off the field and immediately taken to a hospital, but was cleared by the Denver Broncos to return the following week to help Denver try to make the playoffs. Wilson led the team in tackles with 102 in the 2006 season. He earned his fifth Pro Bowl nomination.

The Denver Broncos signed many free agents during the 2007 offseason, such as running back Travis Henry and quarterback Patrick Ramsey, resulting in some salary cap trouble. The Broncos attempted to trade Wilson to the New York Giants, but Wilson failed his physical and the trade talks died down.

Wilson was released by the Denver Broncos on April 13, 2007, due to injuries and salary cap problems.

=== Free agency and retirement ===
Wilson was cleared to return to resume playing by Los Angeles back specialist Bob Watkins in January 2008. On February 12, he had his first visit of the offseason with the Detroit Lions. He also visited the Cleveland Browns in March, but he rejected their offer for close to the veteran minimum.

Wilson officially announced his retirement from professional football on September 10, 2008.

== NFL statistics ==
=== Regular season ===
Year	Team	GP	Tackles				Fumbles		Interceptions					
Year	Team	GP	Comb	Solo	Ast	Sack	FF	FR	Int	Yds	Avg	Lng	TD	PD
1999	DEN	16	71	56	15	1.0	2	2	0	0	0.0	0	0	4
2000	DEN	15	60	47	13	5.0	0	0	3	21	7.0	20	0	7
2001	DEN	16	85	72	13	3.0	0	0	0	0	0.0	0	0	5
2002	DEN	16	131	99	32	5.0	1	2	0	0	0.0	0	0	4
2003	DEN	16	87	69	18	1.0	0	2	0	0	0.0	0	0	7
2004	DEN	16	104	71	33	2.5	2	0	2	17	8.5	10	1	5
2005	DEN	15	72	61	11	3.0	2	1	0	0	0.0	0	0	8
2006	DEN	15	102	79	23	1.0	1	0	0	0	0.0	0	0	4
Career		125	712	554	158	21.5	8	7	5	38	7.6	20	1	44

=== Postseason ===
Year	Team	GP	Tackles				Fumbles		Interceptions					
Year	Team	GP	Comb	Solo	Ast	Sack	FF	FR	Int	Yds	Avg	Lng	TD	PD
2000	DEN	1	6	4	2	0.0	0	0	0	0	0.0	0	0	0
2003	DEN	1	7	6	1	0.0	0	0	0	0	0.0	0	0	0
2004	DEN	1	7	3	4	0.0	0	0	0	0	0.0	0	0	0
2005	DEN	2	18	13	5	0.0	0	0	0	0	0.0	0	0	2
Career		5	38	26	12	0.0	0	0	0	0	0.0	0	0	2

== Personal life ==
After his career with the Denver Broncos ended, Wilson started a career as a Colorado football executive. Wilson became the co-owner of Project FANchise, which puts fans in control of professional teams. In addition, he acquired the Indoor Football League’s Colorado Crush.
