= Kendall Anthony =

American basketball player (born 1993)

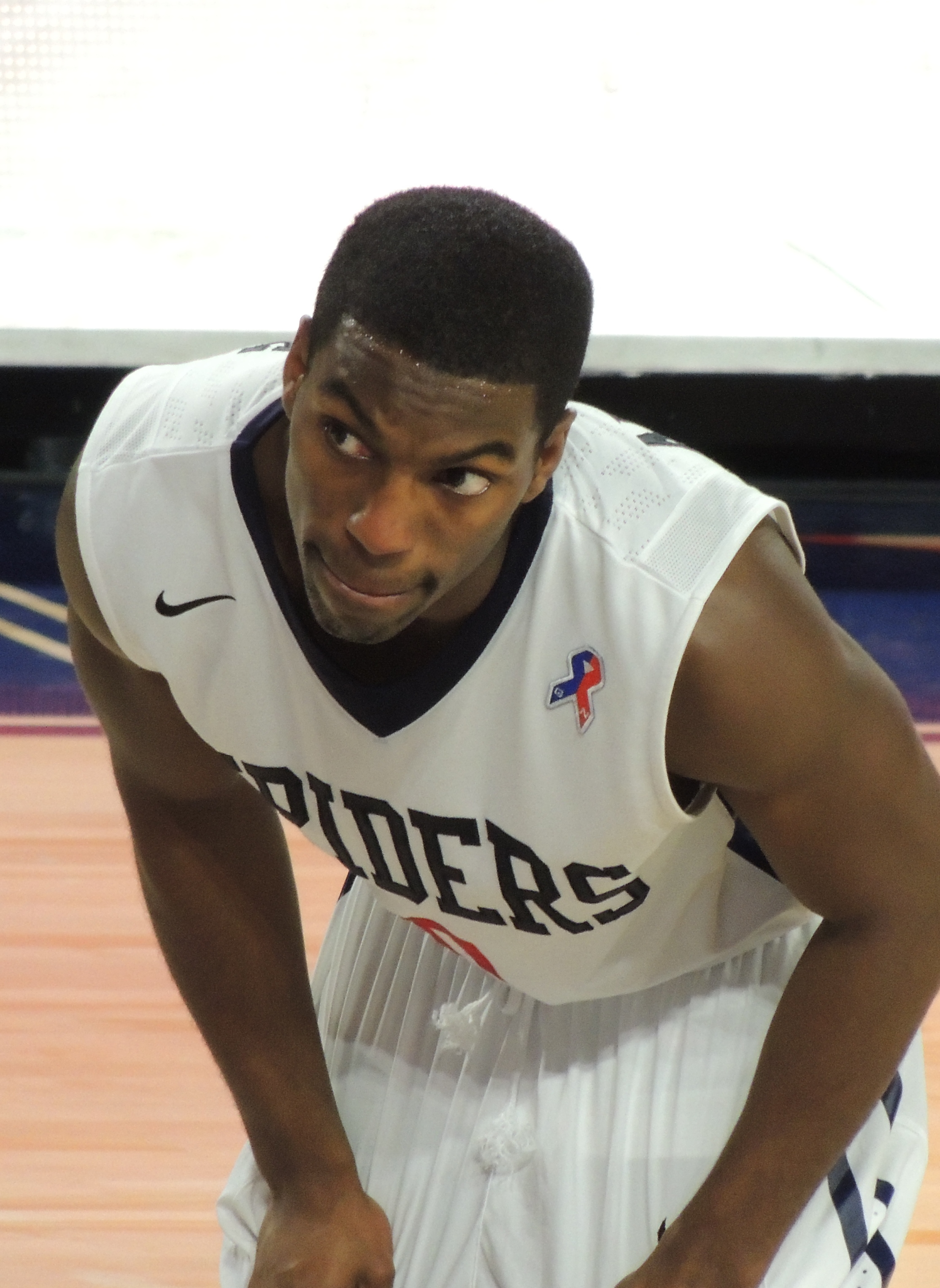
- Anthony with Richmond in 2014

Personal information
- Born: January 13, 1993 (age 33)
- Listed height: 173 cm (5 ft 8 in)
- Listed weight: 64 kg (141 lb)

Career information
- High school: Liberty Technology Magnet (Jackson, Tennessee)
- College: Richmond (2011–2015)
- Playing career: 2015–present
- Position: Point guard
- Number: 0

Career history
- 2015–2016: Gelisim Koleji
- 2016: Sluneta
- 2016–2017: Macae Basquete
- 2017–2018: Bauru
- 2018–2019: Valur
- 2019: BCM Gravelines-Dunkerque
- 2019–2020: Bnei Herzliya
- 2020–2021: Hapoel Galil Elyon
- 2021–2023: Saint-Quentin
- 2023–2024: Élan Béarnais Pau-Orthez
- 2024–2025: Maccabi Rehovot

Career highlights
- Israeli National League champion (2021); NBB scoring champion (2017); NBB All-Star Game (2017); First-team All-Atlantic 10 (2015); Atlantic 10 Rookie of the Year (2012)

Kendall Lamont Anthony (born January 13, 1993) is an American professional basketball player for Élan Béarnais Pau-Orthez for the French Pro A. He played college basketball for the University of Richmond before playing professionally in Turkey, the Czech Republic, Brazil, Iceland, France and Israel.

== High school ==
Anthony played high school basketball for Liberty Technology Magnet where he averaged 28.3 points, 3.8 assists and 2.5 steals as a senior and was a runner-up for Mr. Tennessee Basketball.

== College career ==
Anthony played for the University of Richmond from 2011 to 2015, averaging 14.3 points per game. He was Atlantic 10 All-Conference First Team in 2015 and the Second Team in 2014. He left the school as its fourth all-time leading scorer and first in three-pointers made.

== Professional career ==
His first career stop was with Gelisim Koleji in the TBL where he averaged 12.7 points in 15 games, earning the nickname "the Turkish Allen Iverson".

He spent the 2016–2017 season with Macae Basquete in the Novo Basquete Brasil, averaging a league leading 20.6 points and 5.9 assists in 29 games. In August 2017, he moved over to Bauru Basket of the NBB.

In October 2018, Anthony signed with Valur of the Icelandic Úrvalsdeild karla, replacing Miles Wright. On December 11, he scored 48 points for Valur in a victory against Skallagrímur. In 8 games played for Valur, he averaged 31.5 points, 8.8 assists in 8 games, while shooting 64.1% from three-point range and 94.0% from the free throw line, leading the league in each category.

On January 6, 2019, Anthony parted ways with Valur to join BCM Gravelines-Dunkerque of the French LNB Pro A after they bought up his contract. In 19 games played for Gravelines-Dunkerque, he averaged 11.5 points, 2 rebounds, 4 assists per game, while shooting 41.3 percent from three-point range.

On September 13, 2019, Anthony signed a one-year deal with Bnei Herzliya of the Israeli National League. He spent the 2020–21 season with Hapoel Galil Elyon. On November 6, 2021, Anthony signed with Saint-Quentin of the LNB Pro B.
