= Madison Academic Magnet High School =

Location
- 575 Lambuth Blvd; Jackson, Tennessee; United States
- 35.6222°N 88.8270°W

Information
- Type: Academic Magnet
- Established: 2003
- Principal: Chad Guthrie
- Faculty: 31.00 (FTE)
- Grades: 9-12
- Enrollment: 447 (2022–23)
- Student to teacher ratio: 14.42
- Campus: Urban
- Colors: Navy; Cardinal; Vegas Gold
- Mascot: Mustang
- National ranking: Top 1 Schools In The State Of Tennessee
- Website: Madison Academic Magnet High School

Madison Academic Magnet High School is a public high school in the Jackson Madison County School System located on Lambuth Boulevard and formerly located on Allen Avenue, in Jackson, Tennessee.

It is ranked #15 in Best High Schools in Tennessee according to U.S. News & World Report.

The principal of Madison Academic is Chad Guthrie. The school's course offerings are honors and college-prep courses. Although students do apply for admission, no academic criteria influences selection, as selection is through a lottery system. Once enrolled, students must maintain a C average to remain at the school.

== History ==
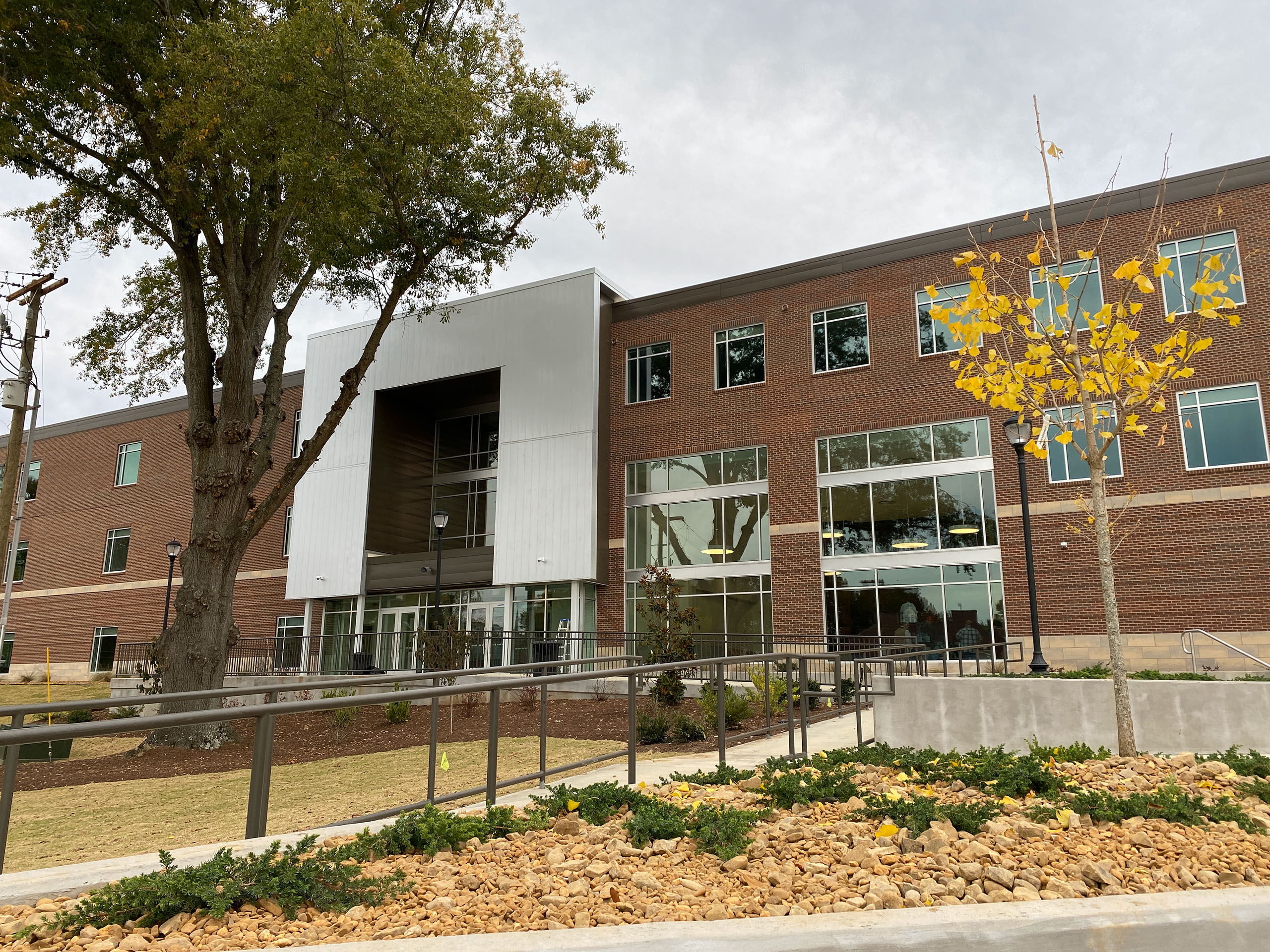
The new building at 575 Lambuth Blvd.

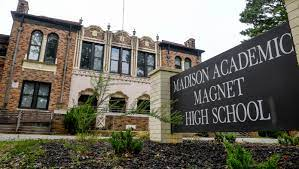
The original building at 179 Allen Ave.

The former building was erected in 1928 as Jackson High School and underwent extensive renovations during the summer of 2003. The school was started in the autumn of 2003, replacing the former west campus of Jackson Central-Merry High School. The new building was constructed in late 2020 and opened in January 2022. The school has a graduating class of fewer than 125 students and does not offer special education classes.

== Athletics ==
Madison Academic Magnet plays in TSSAA's West division and athletic district 7. They compete as the Mustangs and Lady Mustangs. The school offers baseball / softball, basketball, cheerleading, cross country, football, girls' flag football, golf, soccer, tennis, track and field, volleyball.

Team State Titles
Year	Sport	Class	Award	Details
2009	Girls' Basketball	A	Runner-Up	(29-8)
2011	Boys' Tennis	A-AA	Runner-Up	
2018	Girls' Track and Field	Small	800 Meter Relay Champions	
2018	Girls' Track and Field	Small	1600 Meter Relay Champions	
2021	Girls' Track and Field	Small	1600 Meter Relay Champions	
2021	Girls' Track and Field	Small	Runner-Up	
2022	Boys' Soccer	A	Runner-Up	(19-3)
2022	Girls' Track and Field	A	800 Meter Relay Champions	
2023	Boys' Soccer	A	Champions	(20-0-2)

Individual State Titles
Year	Sport	Class	Award	Name / Details
2010	Boys' Cross Country	A-AA	Champion	Matt Joyner
2010	Boys' Track and Field	A-AA	800 Meter Run Champion	Matt Joyner
2011	Boys' Tennis	A-AA	Singles Champion	Josh Ward
2011	Boys' Track and Field	A-AA	1600 Meter Run Champion	Matt Joyner
2011	Boys' Track and Field	A-AA	800 Meter Run Champion	Matt Joyner
2012	Boys' Golf	A-AA	Champion	Sydney Chung
2012	Girls' Track and Field	A-AA	100 Meter Dash Champion	Brooklyn Cole
2021	Girls' Track and Field	Small	100 Meter Dash Champion	JayleAna Wyatt
2022	Boys' Track and Field	A	300 Meter Low Hurdles Champion	Adolfo Mireles
2023	Boys' Track and Field	A	Pole Vault Champion	Adolfo Mireles
