= Captain H.P. Farrar House =

Historical building in Tennessee, US

- Capt. H. P. Farrar House
- U.S. National Register of Historic Places
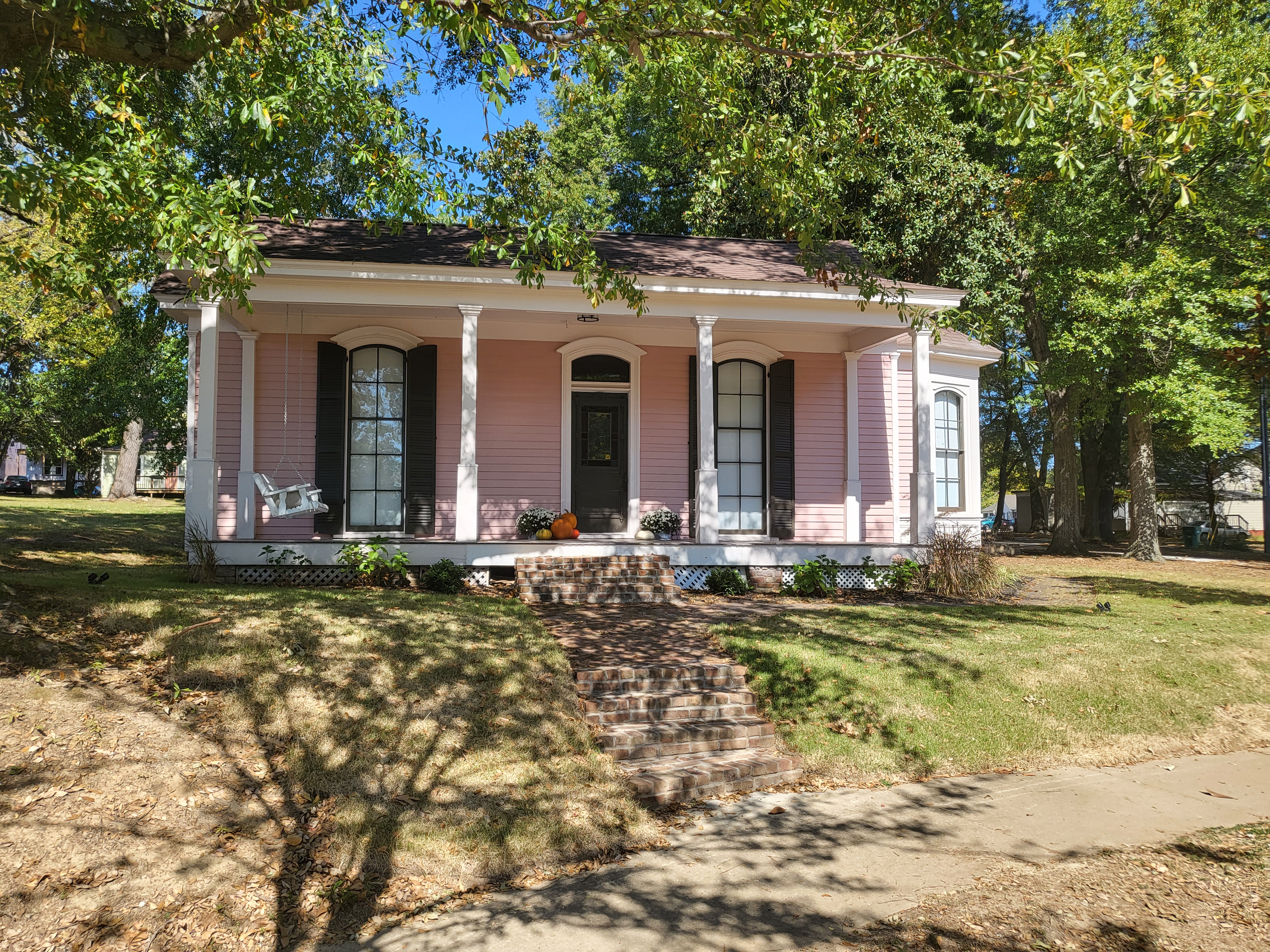
- Front view of house, in 2022

- Location within Tennessee
- Location: 161 West Orleans St., Jackson, Tennessee
- Coordinates: 35.61900°N 88.82201°W
- Area: 0.1 acres (0.040 ha)
- Built: 1847
- Architectural style: Greek Revival, Late Victorian
- NRHP reference No.: 82003989
- Added to NRHP: April 15, 1982

The Captain H.P. Farrar House is a historical home located in Jackson, Tennessee. On April 15, 1982, it was placed on the National Register of Historic Places for both its architectural and historical significance. It is located at the corner of Clay and W. Orleans Streets.

== History ==
The home was built in 1847, by or for its first owner, Duncan Cameron Bledsoe, who owned a cabinet shop that sold wagon wheels, spinning wheels, and other wares to locals and settlers heading West. After several years, Bledsoe himself headed West and in 1871 the house was sold to D.H King, three-time mayor of Jackson. King was known for operating the King's Palace Saloon, where Tennessee's politicians gathered to discuss business. Hartwell Prentice Farrar bought the house in 1873. Farrar was a Union captain during the American Civil War and was wounded at the Battle of Shiloh. He later worked as a civil engineer in charge of the construction of the Illinois Central System railroad expansion from Jackson, Tennessee to New Orleans, Louisiana. Captain Farrar was a community leader who served as a founding member of Jackson's Elk Lodge and a vestryman at St. Luke's Episcopal Church. Upon Farrar's death, the house was left to his daughter who eventually sold the home to Fred Johnsey in 1981. The Johnseys restored the home after conducting research on the original appearance of the house.

== Architecture ==
The home was originally a single-story Greek Revival period cottage. It was remodeled in 1873 by Farrar, who added Victorian influences. It features front and side porches with Doric columns, arched narrow windows, and projecting five-sided window bays. A plain frieze extends across the facade, porch, and side eaves. Decorative wood panels can be found between the windows and brick foundation. The interior of the house has hand-hewn sills, wall studs, and rafters. Floor joists remain that are hand-planed, tongue and grooved poplar wood. Original Greek Revival period fireplace mantels still exist as do the window and door moldings from the original house and the Victorian remodeling. There is an original herringbone brick walkway that surrounds the property.

In 2012, signage indicated that it was being operated as a house museum, but there is no such indication in 2022.
