= Ed "Too Tall" Jones =

American football player (born 1951)

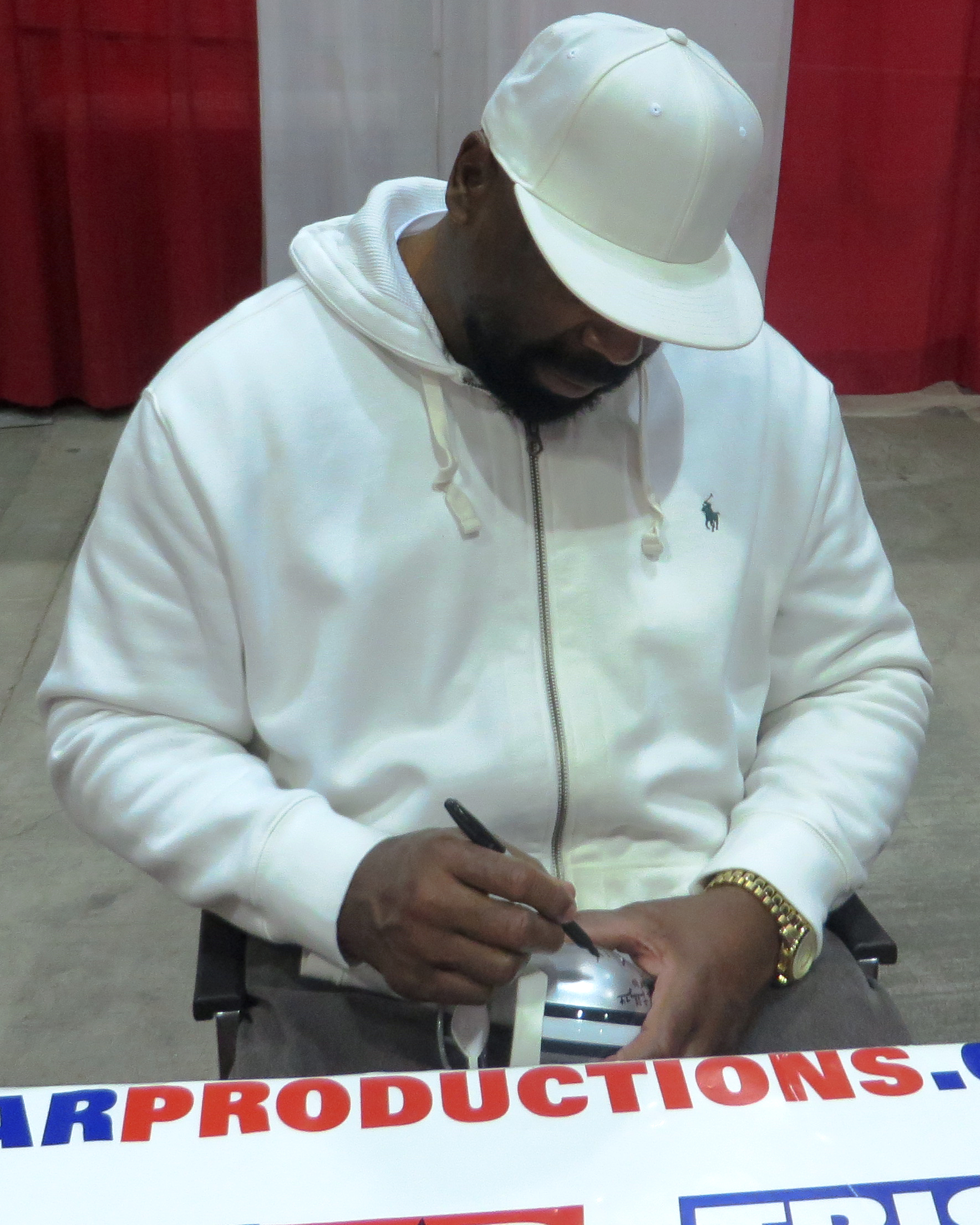
- Jones in 2014

No. 72
- Position: Defensive end

Personal information
- Born: February 23, 1951 (age 75); Jackson, Tennessee, U.S.
- Listed height: 6 ft 9 in (2.06 m)
- Listed weight: 271 lb (123 kg)

Career information
- High school: Merry High (Jackson)
- College: Tennessee State (1972–1973)
- NFL draft: 1974: 1st round, 1st overall pick

Career history
- Dallas Cowboys (1974–1978, 1980–1989)

Awards and highlights
- Super Bowl champion (XII); First-team All-Pro (1982); 2× Second-team All-Pro (1981, 1983); 3× Pro Bowl (1981–1983); PFWA All-Rookie Team (1974); First-team All-American (1973); First-team Little All-American (1973); Second-team Little All-American (1972)

Career NFL statistics
- Games played: 224
- Sacks: 106
- Interceptions: 3
- Interception yards: 14
- Fumble recoveries: 19
- Stats at Pro Football Reference

Edward Lee Jones (born February 23, 1951), commonly known as Ed "Too Tall" Jones due to his height, is an American former professional football player who was a defensive end for 15 seasons (1974–1978, 1980–1989) with the Dallas Cowboys in the National Football League (NFL). In 1979, he briefly left football to attempt a career in professional boxing.

A three-time Pro Bowl and three-time All-Pro selection, Jones finished third in voting for Defensive Rookie of the Year in 1974 and eighth for Defensive Player of the Year in 1981. He was inducted into the Tennessee Sports Hall of Fame in 1994, the Black College Football Hall of Fame in 2013, and the Texas Sports Hall of Fame in 2025.

== Early life ==
Jones was born on February 23, 1951, in Jackson, Tennessee. He attended Merry High School, where he played baseball and basketball. He played only three football games, because his high school did not support the sport until his senior year.

His basketball skills earned him All-America honors and scholarship offers from several Division I (NCAA) programs. He also had offers from Major League Baseball teams to play first base in their farm systems.

As a senior, he fought a Golden Gloves boxing match, recording a knockout of his opponent in less than a minute. He stopped shortly after that, when his basketball coach read an article about the fight, and made him choose between basketball and boxing.

== College career ==
Jones accepted a scholarship from Tennessee State University to play basketball, but left the team after two seasons, to concentrate on playing football under head coach John Merritt.

The 6 ft 9 in (2.06 m) Jones received his famous nickname during his first football practice, after a teammate mentioned that his pants did not fit because he was considered too tall to play football. In his new sport, he became a two-time All-American defensive lineman, playing on a team that lost only two games, en route to winning the black college football national championships in 1971 and 1973.

Jones ranks third in school history in sacks in a season with 12 and fifth in career sacks with 38. In 1999, he was voted to the 50th Anniversary Senior Bowl All-Time Team.

In 2013, he was inducted into the Black College Football Hall of Fame.

== Professional career ==
=== Dallas Cowboys (first stint) ===
In the 1974 NFL draft, the Dallas Cowboys had the first overall draft choice for the first time in their history. Their no. 1 selection had been acquired from the Houston Oilers in exchange for Tody Smith and Billy Parks. The Cowboys drafted Jones first overall. He was the first football player from a historically black college to be picked that high in the NFL draft.

He became a starter at left defensive end during his second season in 1975, and in 1977 he helped the Cowboys win Super Bowl XII. After playing five years for the Cowboys from 1974 through 1978, Jones at 28 years old and in the prime of his athletic career, left football to attempt a professional boxing career.

=== Boxing career ===
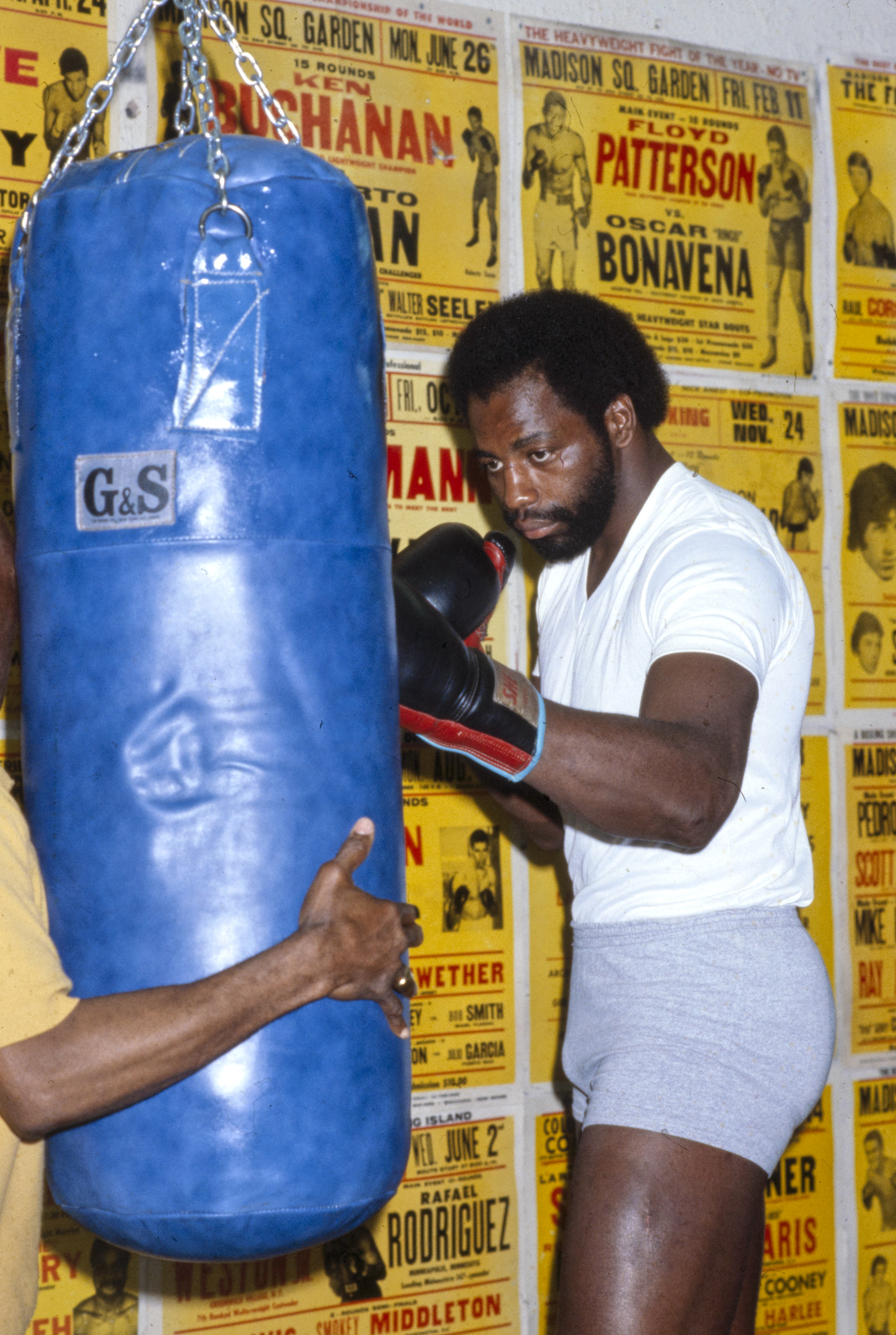
Jones in 1979

A former Golden Gloves fighter in Tennessee, Jones fought six professional bouts as a heavyweight, with a perfect 6–0 record and five knockouts. Due to his high profile as a football player, all of Jones' fights were televised nationally by CBS.

His pro boxing debut, held in Las Cruces, New Mexico, on November 3, 1979, was controversial. Despite giving away over fifty pounds, opponent Abraham Yaqui Meneses dropped Jones with a left hook in the sixth and final round, then hit Jones again illegally when he was down. Jones' cornerman then entered the ring illegally and attempted to revive his fighter with an ammonia bottle. Referee Buddy Basilico reasoned that since both fighters had broken the rules, he would punish neither of them, and let the fight go on. Jones survived the round and was awarded a narrow majority decision, causing the pro-Meneses crowd to boo loudly.

The Meneses bout was the only one of Jones' fights that he did not win by knockout. But his other five opponents were journeymen at best, with the arguable exception of Mexican heavyweight champ Fernando Montes, whom Jones knocked out in just 44 seconds on November 24, 1979. After his last ring appearance on January 26, 1980, Jones announced that he would return to play for the Cowboys. In a 2016 interview, Jones called boxing his favorite sport and said that fighting "was probably the best decision [he] ever made," because his boxing training regimen made him a better football player.

=== Dallas Cowboys (second stint) ===
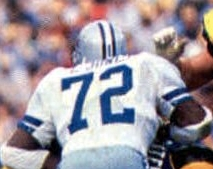
Jones playing with the Cowboys during the 1985 season.

Jones returned to play for the 1980 season, replacing John Dutton at defensive end and performing better than his first stint with the team.

He earned All-Pro and Pro Bowl honors three times from 1981 to 1983. He was one of the most dominant defensive players during this time, playing in 16 playoff games and three Super Bowls. He was part of three NFC championship teams and the Super Bowl XII champion. His success batting down passes convinced the NFL to keep track of it as an official stat.

In 1985 the 34 year-old had a career-high of 13 sacks in spite of being limited with a hamstring injury. He also had 80 tackles and 13 blocked passes. In the fifteenth game, he batted a pass into the hands of teammate Jim Jeffcoat, whose 65-yard touchdown return changed the momentum in the 28–21 win for the NFC East title.

In 1987, he led the team in sacks (10) for the second time in the previous three years. He also tallied 61 tackles, 7 blocked passes and one fumble recovery. He had a single-game career-high of 4 sacks in the 33–24 upset victory over the New York Giants.

In 1989, with the arrival of new head coach Jimmy Johnson, the team experienced a youth movement. Seven weeks into the season, Johnson indicated that rookie Tony Tolbert would start in place of Jones against the Phoenix Cardinals, motivating Cowboys fans to stage a call-in campaign to allow Jones to reach 200 career starts, forcing Johnson to relent and allow Jones to start not only the next two games to reach the milestone, but also the following 3 contests. He appeared in 16 games with 10 starts, collecting 39 tackles, one sack, 4 passes defensed, one forced fumble and 3 blocked kicks. Despite this, he has yet to be named to the Cowboys Ring of Honor.

On June 5, 1990, the 39 year-old announced his retirement, having never missed a game. He was tied with Mark Tuinei and Bill Bates for most seasons (15) played in franchise history. Jason Witten broke his record for games played and L.P. Ladouceur has broken his record for most seasons played.

The NFL did not start recognizing quarterback sacks as an official stat until 1982; although the Cowboys have their own records, dating back before the 1982 season. According to the Cowboys' stats, Jones is unofficially credited with a total of 106 quarterback sacks (third most in team history) and officially with 57.5. He appeared in 224 games with 203 starts, while recording 1,032 tackles (third in franchise history), 19 fumble recoveries, 86 blocked passes and 3 interceptions.

== Acting career ==
Jones’ acting credits in television include appearing as himself in the Diff'rent Strokes season 3 episode, "The Magician", and in the 1992 Married... with Children episode, "Just Shoe It", as one of the famous athletes in a sports shoes commercial that the character, Al Bundy, is starring in.

Jones starred in a GEICO commercial that initially aired in late 2009. The commercial rhetorically asks if Jones is indeed "too tall," then confirms it by showing a nurse attempting to measure his height, but breaking the medical scale's height rod when it doesn't reach high enough. The nurse then mutters, "I'm just going to guesstimate."

== Other ==
Jones was a guest referee at the World Wrestling Federation's WrestleMania 2 pay-per-view in 1986. He refereed from outside of the ring during the 20-man battle royale which included American football stars of the day.
