= List of mayors of Jackson, Tennessee =

City of Jackson, Tennessee mayors

The following is a list of mayors of the city of Jackson, Tennessee, United States of America.

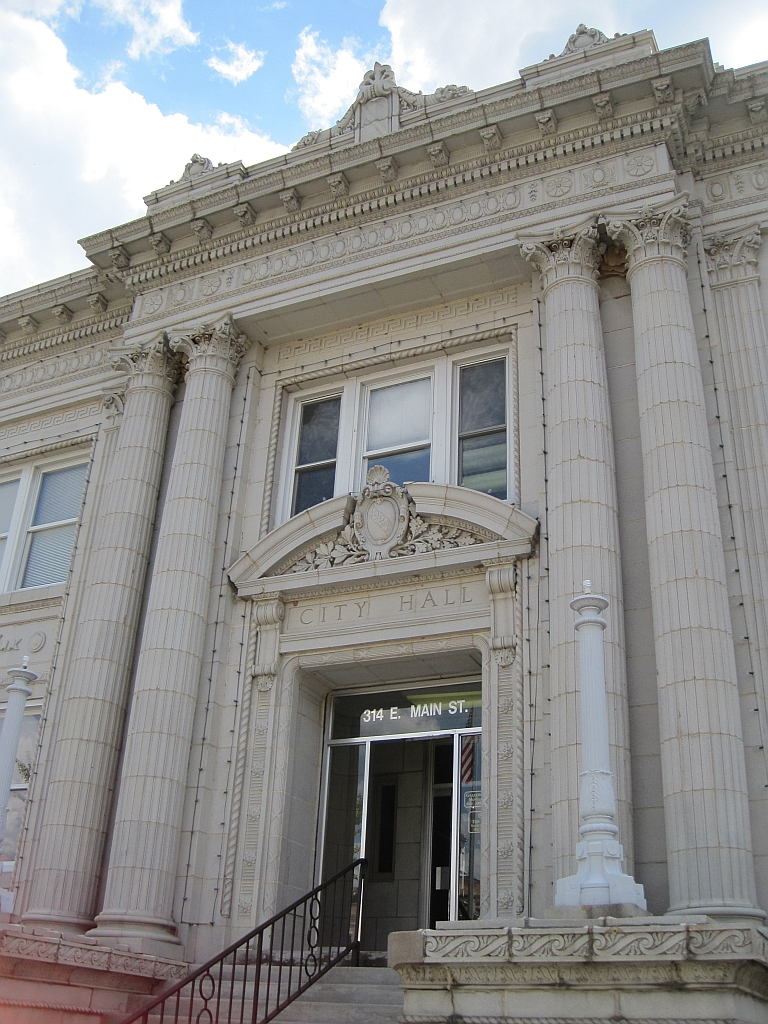
Former city hall building in Jackson, Tennessee (2011 photo)

- R. J. Hays, 1845-1846, 1856-1858
- J. H. L. Tomlin, 1846-1853
- Alexander Jackson, 1854-1855
- S. Cypert, 1857
- William Alexander, 1859, 1869
- J. H. Harper, 1860
- P. D. W. Conger, 1861
- R. J. Mason, 1862
- G. Adamson, 1863-1865
- William Anderson, 1866-1867, 1869
- J. J. McAlexander, 1868
- William N. Dunnaway, 1870, 1872
- D. H. King, 1873, 1875-1876
- J. A. Arrington, 1874
- L. E. Talbot, 1877
- W. D. Robinson, 1878, 1880, 1885-1886
- James O' Connor, 1879
- J. M. Sullivan, 1881
- B. L. Rozell, 1882
- John W. Buford, 1883-1884
- Hu C. Anderson, Sr., 1884, 1894-1908
- J. H. Hirsch, 1887-1888
- John W. Gates, 1889-1891
- E.A. Clark, 1892-1893
- Thomas G. Polk, 1909-1910
- C. E. Griffin, 1911-1915
- Lawrence Taylor, 1915-1919, 1923-1935
- J. D. Johnson, 1919-1923
- A. B. Foust, 1935-1943
- George Smith, 1943-1951, 1955-1959, 1963-1967
- Emmet Guy, 1951-1955
- Quinton D. Edmonds, 1959-1963
- Robert D. Conger, 1967-1989
- Charles H. Farmer, 1989-2007
- Jerry Gist, 2007-2019
- Scott Conger, 2019–present

== See also ==
- Mayoral elections in Jackson, Tennessee
- Jackson history
