= Scott Conger =

Mayor of Jackson, Tennessee since 2019 (born 1984)

Mayor of Jackson, Tennessee
- Incumbent
- Assumed office July 1, 2019
- Preceded by: Jerry Gist

Personal details
- Born: August 2, 1984 (age 42)
- Party: Independent
- Spouse: Nikki Conger
- Children: 2
- Education: Lane College (BA); Bethel University (MBA)
- Website: Government website

Scott Conger (born August 2, 1983) is an American politician who has served as the 35th Mayor of Jackson, Tennessee since 2019. Though elected in a non-partisan municipal election, Conger is an independent.

== Early life and education ==
Conger was born August 2, 1983. He is the grandson of Robert D. Conger (1928-2011), who served as Jackson's mayor from 1967-1989.

He received a bachelor's degree from Lane College. While there, he received the Tradition Award and Outstanding Young Alumni from the National Alumni Council of the UNCF. He later received his Master of Business Administration from Bethel University.

== Career ==
Conger served as a city councilman from 2011 to 2017, representing District 5 of Midtown Jackson. Conger was president CEO of United Way of West Tennessee from 2015 to 2019.

On June 18, 2019, Conger was elected as the 35th mayor of Jackson, Tennessee, succeeding Jerry Gist, who had been in office since 2007. Upon inauguration on July 1, 2019, Conger became the city's youngest mayor at 35 years old. Though elected in a non-partisan municipal election, Conger is an independent.

== Personal life ==
Conger is married to Nikki Conger and has two children: Madelynn and Charlie.

== Electoral history ==
=== 2019 Jackson mayoral ===
Jackson First Round Election, 2019
Candidate	Votes	%
Scott Conger	3,803	34.14%
Jerry W. Woods	3,070	27.56%
Jimmy Eldredge	2,809	25.22%
Mark Johnstone	1,193	10.71%
Vicky Foote	264	2.37%
Total	11,139	100%

Jackson Runoff Election, 2019
Candidate	Votes	%
Scott Conger	7,397	63.03%
Jerry W. Woods	4,339	36.97%
Total	11,736	100%

=== 2023 Jackson mayoral ===
Jackson First Round Election, 2023
Candidate	Votes	%
Scott Conger (I)	3,927	46.95%
Ray Condray	2,452	29.31%
Jerry W. Woods	1,458	17.43%
Daryl K. Hubbard	423	5.06%
Lisa Williams-Lyons	91	1.09%
Paul Sherrod	11	0.13%
Write-ins	3	0.04%
Total	8,365	100%

Jackson Runoff Election, 2023
Candidate	Votes	%
Scott Conger (I)	5,304	58.11%
Ray Condray	3,813	41.78%
Write-ins	10	0.11%
Total	9,127	100%

== See also ==
- List of mayors of Jackson, Tennessee
