= Kenny Parchman =

American musician

Kenneth W. Parchman (January 15, 1932 in Jackson, Tennessee – June 2, 1999 near Madison, Tennessee) was a rockabilly musician associated to Sun Records. Although largely forgotten in his native US, he developed a following in Europe. He was survived by Lorene Parchman, his wife of 38 years.
