= St. Luke's Episcopal Church (Jackson, Tennessee) =

Historic church in Tennessee, United States

- St. Luke Episcopal Church
- U.S. National Register of Historic Places
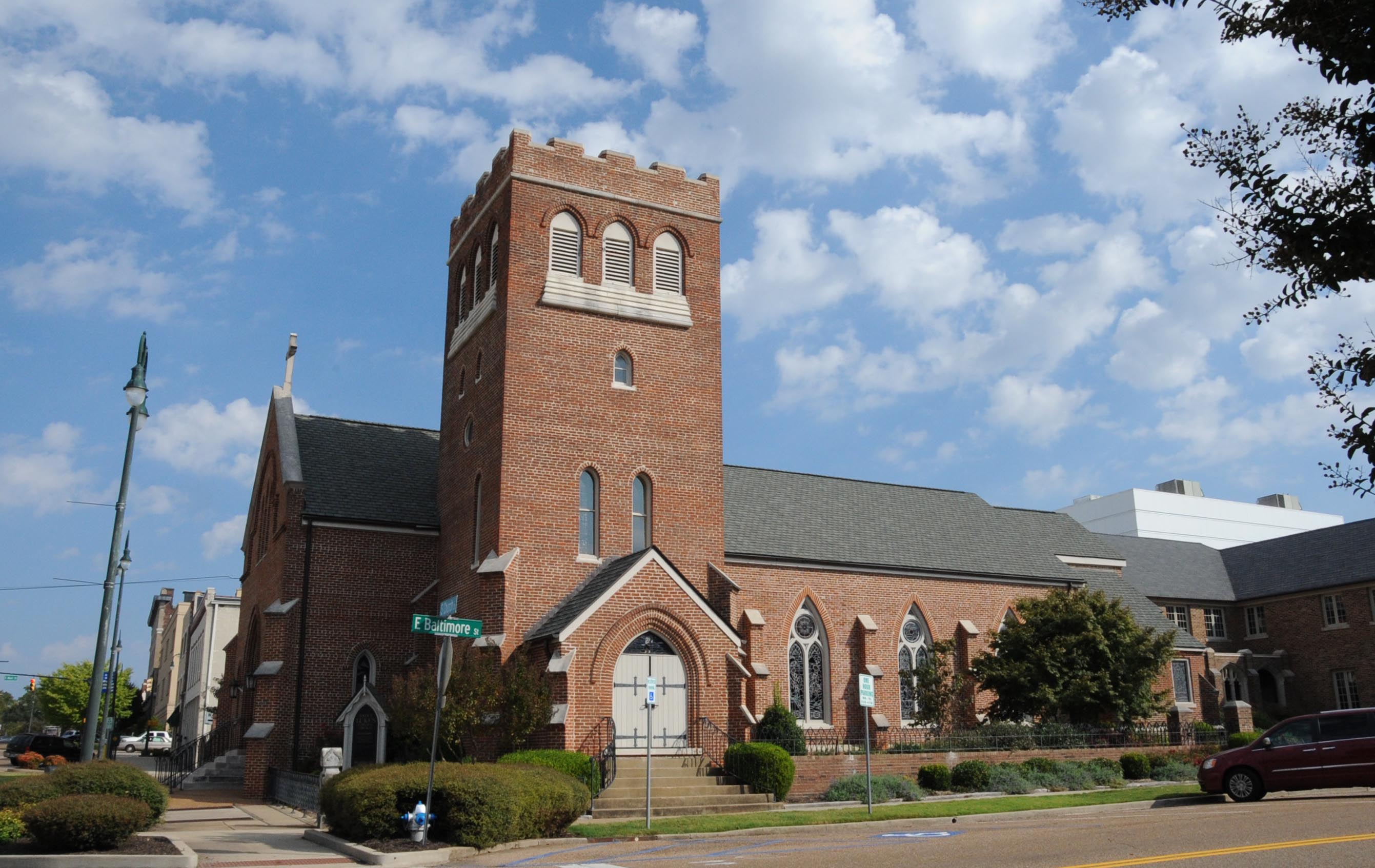

- Location within Tennessee Location within the United States
- Location: 309 E. Baltimore St., Jackson, Tennessee
- Coordinates: 35°36′49″N 88°49′1″W
- Area: less than one acre
- Built: 1845
- Architectural style: Gothic Revival, Early English
- NRHP reference No.: 84003600
- Added to NRHP: May 24, 1984

St. Luke's Episcopal Church is a historic church at 309 E. Baltimore Street in Jackson, Tennessee, United States. The congregation was formed in 1832, the first of five new Episcopal congregations planted in West Tennessee that year after Mrs. Mary Hayes Willis Gloster of La Grange had traveled to Nashville to ask Bishop James H. Otey to bring the Episcopal Church to West Tennessee. The church building dates to 1845, although it was only partially completed that year. It was consecrated by Bishop Otey on May 14, 1853.

The church's bell and its hand-pumped organ were installed in 1852. The church has a brass altar cross that is a copy of a cross in a Westminster Abbey chapel. The cross and a brass alms basin were presented to St. Luke's in 1867 by Bishop Charles Quintard, who had received them as gifts from a duchess he met in England.

The church was added to the National Register of Historic Places in 1984.
