= Jabari Greer =

American football player (born 1982)

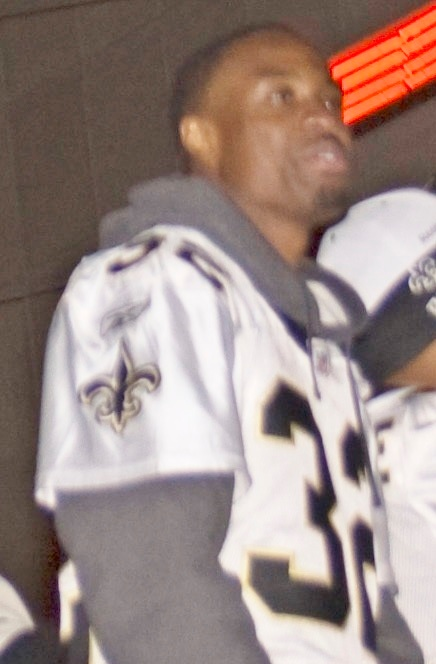
- Greer at the New Orleans Saints' Super Bowl XLIV victory parade in 2010.

No. 37, 33, 32
- Position: Cornerback

Personal information
- Born: February 11, 1982 (age 44); Milwaukee, Wisconsin, U.S.
- Listed height: 5 ft 11 in (1.80 m)
- Listed weight: 180 lb (82 kg)

Career information
- High school: South Side (Jackson, Tennessee)
- College: Tennessee
- NFL draft: 2004: undrafted

Career history
- Buffalo Bills (2004–2008); New Orleans Saints (2009–2013)

Awards and highlights
- Super Bowl champion (XLIV); New Orleans Saints Hall of Fame

Career NFL statistics
- Total tackles: 413
- Sacks: 2
- Forced fumbles: 2
- Fumble recoveries: 1
- Interceptions: 13
- Defensive touchdowns: 4
- Stats at Pro Football Reference

Jabari Amin Greer (born February 11, 1982) is an American former professional football player who was a cornerback in the National Football League (NFL). He played college football for the Tennessee Volunteers and was signed by the Buffalo Bills as an undrafted free agent in 2004. Greer played five seasons for the New Orleans Saints, where he was a defensive starter in Super Bowl XLIV as the Saints won their first NFL championship.

== Early life ==
Born in Milwaukee, Wisconsin, Greer moved to Texas at age seven and later lived in Jackson, Tennessee, where he attended South Side High School. At South Side, Greer was an all-state selection in football and won seven individual state track championships.

== College career ==
During his college career at Tennessee, Greer participated in track and field as well as football. He broke the 110m hurdles school record that had previously been held by Collin Henderson. He was the 2003 NCAA Indoor Champion for 60 meter hurdles. Greer was a three-year starter at cornerback and broke a school record by playing in 51 games. He graduated from Tennessee in 2004 with a degree in psychology.

== Professional career ==
Pre-draft measurables
Height	Weight	Arm length	Hand span	40-yard dash	10-yard split	20-yard split	Vertical jump	Broad jump	Bench press
5 ft 10 in (1.78 m)	178 lb (81 kg)	31 1/8 in (0.79 m)	8 7/8 in (0.23 m)	4.45 s	1.56 s	2.62 s	36 1/2 in (0.93 m)	10 ft 6 in (3.20 m)	7 reps
All values were from NFL Scouting Combine. See also scouting report.

=== Buffalo Bills ===
NFL Draft Scout predicted Greer to be a fourth or fifth round pick in the 2004 NFL draft, but Greer was not selected. Greer's scouting report noted that he lacked size, a factor that might pose "problems in handling the larger receivers." The Buffalo Bills signed Greer on April 26, 2004, as an undrafted free agent. While in Buffalo he played mostly as a nickel or dimeback and on special teams. In 2008, he started the first 10 games of the season, recording two Pick 6s before suffering an injury.

=== New Orleans Saints ===
On March 4, 2009, Greer signed a four-year contract with the New Orleans Saints. He became a starter for the Saints and returned an interception for a touchdown in a game against the Atlanta Falcons. He was injured on November 8, 2009, and missed most of the rest of the 2009 regular season, but returned in time to play a significant role in the playoffs as the Saints won their first Super Bowl.

On February 12, 2014, three months after tearing his left ACL against the 49ers, Greer was cut by the New Orleans Saints to create more cap space for the team.

Greer excelled in the playoffs with the Saints. In six postseason games, he recorded three interceptions and 11 passes defensed.

=== Retirement ===
On September 11, 2014, Greer announced his retirement during an appearance on ESPN.

Greer now works as an NFL Analyst for TSN in Canada, as well as a college football analyst for SEC Network.

Greer also was an on air broadcaster for Your Call Football, an interactive game where fans call real time plays for players, including former NFL players such as Greer.

In 2023, Greer was inducted in the Saints Hall of Fame.

== Career statistics ==
Year	Team	G	GS	Tackles					Interceptions						Fumbles			
Year	Team	G	GS	Comb	Solo	Ast	Sack	Safety	Passes defended	Int	Yds	Avg	Lng	TDs	FF	FR	Yds	TD
2004	BUF	12	1	15	14	1	1.0	0	2	0	0	0	0	0	0	0	0	0
2005	BUF	16	2	35	26	9	1.0	0	3	0	0	0	0	0	0	0	0	0
2006	BUF	16	0	22	18	4	0.0	0	1	0	0	0	0	0	0	0	0	0
2007	BUF	16	13	46	41	5	0.0	0	14	2	1	0	2	0	1	0	0	0
2008	BUF	10	10	38	32	6	0.0	0	7	2	75	0	42	2	1	0	0	0
2009	NO	9	8	44	41	3	0.0	0	13	2	59	0	48	1	0	0	0	0
2010	NO	14	13	61	54	7	0.0	0	12	2	50	0	26	1	0	1	0	0
2011	NO	16	16	71	60	11	0.0	0	18	1	2	0	2	0	0	0	0	0
2012	NO	14	13	51	36	15	0.0	0	13	3	31	0	28	0	0	0	0	0
2013	NO	10	10	30	26	4	0.0	0	13	1	22	0	28	0	0	0	0	0
Career		133	86	413	348	65	2.0	0	95	13	240	–	48	4	2	1	0	0

== Personal life ==
Greer became a single father after the passing of his wife, Katrina. He has established a non-profit foundation, the Greer Campaign, focused on programs to assist both single and married fathers in developing their parenting skills.

While playing for the Saints, Greer wrote a weekly column for The Times-Picayune.
