= Tank Black =

American football player and coach

William H. "Tank" Black Jr. (born March 11, 1957) is a former sports agent. Black was an assistant coach for the University of South Carolina Gamecocks before starting his Columbia, South Carolina-based sports agency, Professional Management Incorporated (PMI) in 1988. His first client was former Gamecocks wide receiver Sterling Sharpe, a first-round draft pick by the Green Bay Packers in 1988.

Black's career peaked in April 1999 when he set a new record for a single agent by signing five of that year's 31 first-round NFL draft picks, plus three second-round draft picks. Within a year he had been accused of improperly funneling cash to college players, and became implicated in a money laundering case, a Ponzi investment scheme, and allegations by the Securities and Exchange Commission that he was involved in a stock swindle. In a plea agreement, he admitted to money laundering and obstruction of justice charges, and lost a criminal trial on charges of stock fraud by the Securities and Exchange Commission. In 2004, while serving nearly seven years in prison, he represented himself in his appeal of the SEC-related case and won, effectively clearing himself of allegations that he cheated clients. He was released from prison in December 2007.

== Early life ==
William H. Black, Jr. was born on March 11, 1957, in Johnson City, Tennessee, to William H. Black, Sr. and Thelma Brown. His father nicknamed him "Tank" because of his son's unusual birth weight (11 pounds) and broad head. He played college football from 1975 to 1978 for Carson–Newman and received National Association of Intercollegiate Athletics All-America honors three times.

== Coaching career ==
Black joined the coaching staff at the University of Tennessee at Chattanooga in 1980, and in 1983, became a wide receivers coach at the University of South Carolina, and the school's top recruiter. In 1987, Black left the program after he was passed over for a promised promotion to offensive coordinator.

== Downfall ==
Black hired James Franklin, Jr., a Columbia, South Carolina lawyer, in September 1997 to help manage the growing business. Franklin introduced Black to representatives of Cash 4 Titles, which made small loans at high interest rates to individuals who put their cars up as collateral. Cash 4 Titles was looking for investors and promising a 20% return, and offered commissions to Black's firm for investments by his clients. Black subsequently invested his own money along with some of his clients, friends, and family. Unknown to Black at the time, Cash 4 Titles was a Ponzi scheme and Franklin was secretly being paid finder's fees by Cash 4 Titles.

By 1999, Black was looking for new business opportunities and began preliminary talks to sell his agency to Percy Miller, better known as rap star Master P. Black's company (PMI) was estimated to be worth as much as $100 million at the time.

In 1999, a rival agent complained to the NFL Players Association that Black was illegally providing money to college players before they were eligible for the draft. In May, the University of Florida police department formally charged Black with violating Florida laws against early recruiting of college players and executed a search warrant on Black's Columbia, South Carolina, office. In a highly questionable move, the university police turned over all of Black's records to the NFL Players Association. Black went to court and won possession of his records back but a month later, the FBI executed a search warrant on PMI's offices, again removing all his records and computers.

Black's clients began asking for their money back from Cash 4 Titles. The company returned some of the money but was itself the subject of an SEC investigation. By February 2000, Cash 4 Titles was exposed as a fraud, and Black was charged with “fraudulently causing two dozen athletes” to lose an estimated $13.5 million.

By July 2000, Black had pleaded guilty to providing loans to college players in Florida, was facing SEC fraud charges, was being sued by several of his players for the money they lost in Cash 4 Titles, and had been indicted in Detroit on money laundering and drug charges related to his involvement in Bryant's investments in Cash 4 Titles. Black ended up pleading guilty to fraud and money laundering.

== Consequences ==
Black was sentenced to 82 months in prison on the money laundering charges in Michigan. In Florida, he fought the SEC charges but was found guilty of fraud, and obstruction of justice. Four years later, while in jail, Black represented himself in an appeal of a civil suit the SEC had filed against him and won. The court found there was no evidence that Black knew anything about the Cash 4 Titles scheme.

In June 2001, the television program America's Most Wanted aired a segment on Dean Parker, a fugitive in the Detroit cocaine case. Black agreed to be interviewed for the program in prison, talking about his relationship with Parker and how he had allowed Parker to use Black's leased jet to escape to Jamaica. Parker committed suicide a few months later as police were about to arrest him in East St. Louis, Illinois.

In October 2004, while still in prison, Black sued Vince Carter for $14 million in unpaid agent fees. Black won and to avoid a protracted appeal, settled for $4.7 million with the Carter family.

Black was released from federal prison in December 2007, and from a halfway house in May 2008. Black returned to federal prison in 2011 for not making his restitution payments and was released on March 7, 2014.
