= Jackson-Madison County School System =

Public school system in Tennessee, United States

Location
- Jackson, Madison County, Tennessee; United States

District information
- Type: Public School System
- Motto: Best By Any Measure; Choose Us!
- Superintendent: Dr. Marlon King
- NCES District ID: 4702580

Students and staff
- Enrollment: 12,463 (2022-2023)
- Teachers: 735.16 (on an FTE basis)
- Student–teacher ratio: 16.95

Other information
- Website: www.jmcss.org

Jackson-Madison County School System (JMCSS) or Jackson-Madison County School District is a school district headquartered in Jackson, Tennessee. It serves, in addition to the city, the rest of Madison County. As of 2016 the enrollment was over 13,000.

In 2015, Verna Ruffin, the superintendent at the time, proposed "Vision 2020" which would be a plan to help the school system. The result of the plan being passed resulted in the closure of five schools.

As of 2016, the county government funded the district's budget.

Jackson-Madison County School System's current superintendent is Dr. Marlon King

=== Enrollment & Staffing ===
- Enrollment (2023–2024): 12,662 student
- Enrollment (2022–2023): 12,463 students
- Teachers (2023–2024): 880.16 full-time classroom teachers
- Student–teacher ratio: 14.39

=== Academic Performance ===
- 2021–2022 overall proficiency: 16% of students scored at or above proficiency
- Historical data shows fluctuations, with higher proficiency in earlier years (e.g., 41% in 2014–2015)

=== District Budget (2021–2022) ===
- Total revenue: $145,318,000
- Federal: $31,345,000 (22%)
- Local: $57,107,000 (39%)
- State: $56,866,000 (39%)

=== Additional Information ===
JMCSS is a large, diverse public school district offering traditional, magnet, Montessori, STEM, and early college pathways. With more than 12,600 students and 26 schools, it plays a central role in education across Madison County.

== Schools ==
=== High schools ===
- Jackson Central-Merry Early College High School
- Madison Academic Magnet High School
- North Side High School
- South Side High School
- Liberty Technology Magnet High School
- Jackson Central Merry High School

=== Middle schools ===
- Jackson Career and Technology School- Formerly, it was an elementary
- North Parkway Middle School
- Northeast Middle School
- West Bemis Middle School
- Jackson Central Merry Middle School

=== Elementary schools ===
- JCM Elementary School- Formerly, Alexandar Elementary School
- Andrew Jackson Elementary School
- Arlington Elementary School
- Denmark Elementary School
- East Elementary School
- Isaac Lane Elementary School
- Lincoln Elementary School
- South Elementary School
- Thelma Barker Elementary School

=== Early Learning ===
- Nova Early Learning School

=== Alternative ===
- Community Montessori
- Parkview Prep Academy
- Rose Hill School
- Jackson Academic Steam Academy
- Malesus STEM Innovation Center

=== Pre-K - 8 ===
- Community Montessori
- Pope School
- Rose Hill School

=== Virtual Homeschool ===
- Jackson Academic STEAM Academy
