= Jackson, Tennessee =

- City
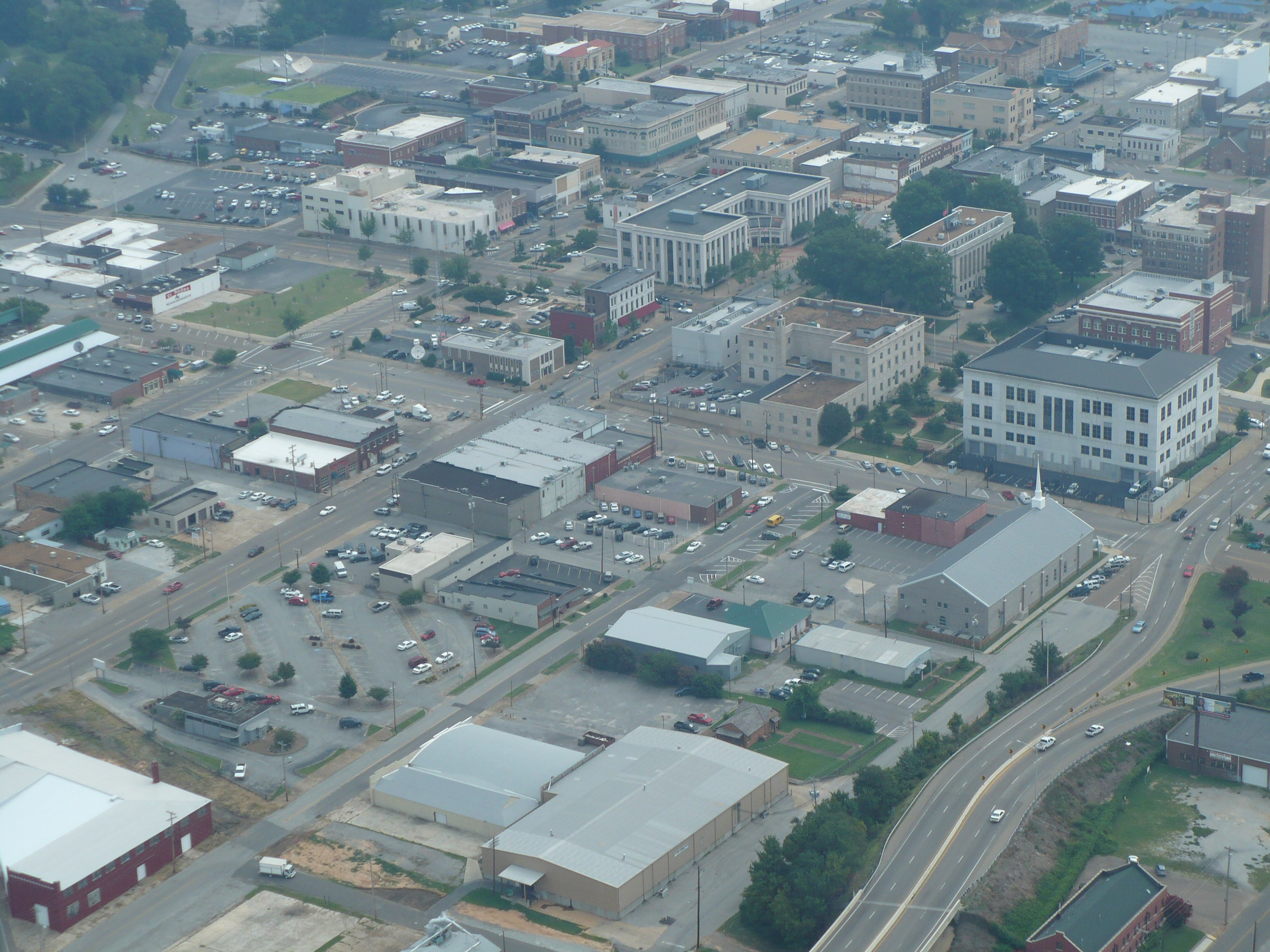
- Aerial View of Jackson

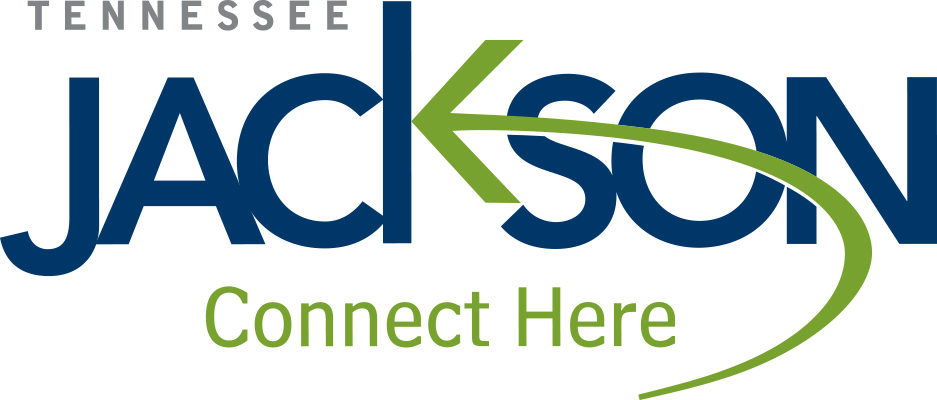
- Flag Logo
- Nickname: Hub City
- Location of Jackson in Madison County, Tennessee

- Location within Tennessee Location within the United States
- Coordinates: 35°36′52″N 88°48′50″W
- Country: United States
- State: Tennessee
- County: Madison
- Founded: 1821
- Incorporated: 1845
- Named for: Andrew Jackson

Government
  - Mayor: Scott Conger (since 2019)

Area
  - Total: 58.75 sq mi (152.17 km^{2})
  - Land: 58.74 sq mi (152.14 km^{2})
  - Water: 0.012 sq mi (0.03 km^{2})
- Elevation: 410 ft (125 m)

Population (2020)
  - Total: 68,205
  - Density: 1,161/sq mi (448.3/km^{2})
- Time zone: UTC−6 (Central)
  - Summer (DST): UTC−5 (CDT)
- ZIP Codes: 38301-38303, 38305, 38308, 38314
- Area code: 731
- FIPS code: 47-37640
- GNIS feature ID: 1289178
- Website: City of Jackson Official Website

Jackson is a city in and the county seat of Madison County, Tennessee, United States. Located 70 miles (110 km) east of Memphis and 130 miles (210 km) southwest of Nashville, it is a regional center of trade for West Tennessee. Its total population was 68,205 as of the 2020 United States census. Jackson is the primary city of the Jackson, Tennessee, metropolitan area, Madison County's largest city, and the second-largest city in West Tennessee after Memphis. It is home to the Tennessee Supreme Court's courthouse for West Tennessee, as Jackson was the major city in the west when the court was established in 1834.

In the antebellum era, Jackson was the market city for an agricultural area based on cultivation of cotton, the major commodity crop. Beginning in 1851, the city became a hub of railroad systems ultimately connecting to major markets in the north and south, as well as east and west. This was key to its development, attracting trade and many workers on the railroads in the late 19th century with the construction of railroads after the American Civil War. Through the 1960s, the city was served by 15 passenger trains daily, but industry restructuring reduced such service and caused the loss of jobs. The economy has adjusted to new businesses, with major manufacturing in the area.

== History ==
=== Early settlement ===
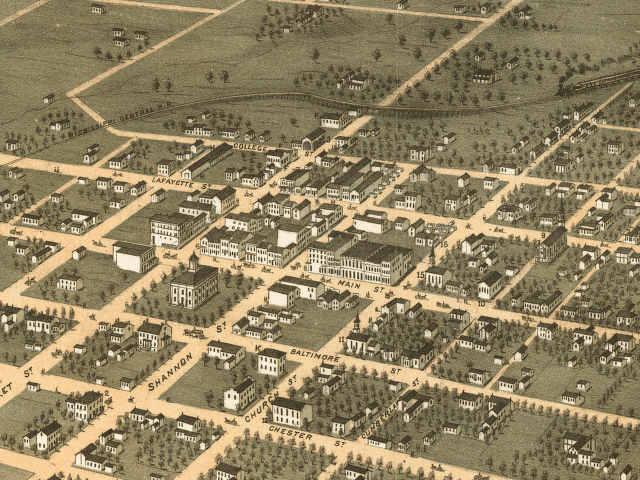
A bird's eye view of Jackson, Madison County, Tennessee 1870

This area was occupied by the historic Chickasaw people at the time of European encounter. They were pushed out by European-American settlers under various treaties with the United States, in actions authorized by the Indian Removal Act of 1830 and ratified by the U.S. Senate.

European-American settlement of Jackson began along the Forked Deer River before 1820, primarily by migrants from eastern areas of the Upper South, such as Virginia and Kentucky. Originally named Alexandria, the city was renamed in 1822 to honor General Andrew Jackson, a hero of the War of 1812. He was later elected as President of the United States.

The City of Jackson was founded by an act of the Tennessee General Assembly, passed in 1821, entitled an "act to establish a seat of justice for Henry, Carroll, Henderson, and Madison Counties." The act required 50 acres (20 ha) of land to be deeded to the commissioners. The commissioners chosen by the legislature were Sterling Brewer and James Fentress. The places considered for the seat of justice were Alexandria, Golden's Station, and Jackson. The larger portion of the settlers at that time were living on Cotton Grove Road, and as Jackson was closer to them than either of the other settlements, it was determined to be the more suitable site for the seat of justice.

At the time of the second Tennessee State Constitution in 1834, when the Tennessee Supreme Court was established, Memphis had not yet been developed. The county seat of Jackson was the most significant city in West Tennessee, and this was designated as a site for the State Supreme Court in this part of the state.

The city of Jackson did not establish public elections until 1837, with a board of aldermen elected at-large. From 1854 to 1915, Jackson had a board of eight members elected from four districts, each with two members elected at-large. Free people of color and freedmen were not allowed to vote in the state until after passage of federal constitutional amendments following the Civil War that granted them citizenship and suffrage.

This area was initially developed for agricultural purposes, especially cotton plantations for producing the chief commodity crop of the Mississippi Valley and Deep South. Cotton plantations were dependent on the labor of slaves, and thousands were brought into the area as it was developed. As county seat, Jackson was a trading town and retail center for surrounding agricultural areas.

Developing as a railroad hub of several lines became most important to Jackson's industrial and population growth from 1852 on for the next 100 years.

=== Civil War through 19th century ===
In 1862, Tennessee came under the control of Union forces and was occupied until General Ulysses S. Grant decided to concentrate his efforts to the South. Between December 11, 1862, and January 1, 1863, an engagement at Jackson occurred during Confederate Brigadier General Nathan Bedford Forrest's expedition into West Tennessee. Forrest wanted to disrupt the rail supply line to Grant's army, which was campaigning along the route of the Mississippi Central Railroad. If Forrest destroyed the Mobile & Ohio Railroad running south from Columbus, Kentucky, through Jackson, Grant would have to curtail or halt his operations altogether.

Forrest's 2,100-man cavalry brigade crossed the Tennessee River on December 17. Grant ordered a soldier concentration at Jackson under Brigadier General Jeremiah C. Sullivan and sent a cavalry force under Colonel Robert G. Ingersoll. Forrest's command defeated the Union cavalry in Lexington, Tennessee, on December 18. As Forrest continued his advance the following day, Sullivan ordered Colonel Adolph Englemann to take a small force northeast of Jackson.

At Old Salem Cemetery, acting on the defensive, Englemann's two infantry regiments repelled a Confederate mounted attack, then withdrew a mile closer to the city. The fight amounted to no more than a feint and show of force intended to hold Jackson's Union defenders in position, while two mounted Confederate columns destroyed railroad track to both the north and south of the town, then returned. Forrest withdrew from the Jackson area to attack Trenton and Humboldt after this mission was accomplished.

As a result of the destruction of the railroad, Grant abandoned his plans to invade Mississippi from Tennessee in favor of an attack on Vicksburg, Mississippi, for control of the river. Federal troops left Jackson and moved to Memphis, which became a major center for Union troops for the duration of the war. Forrest returned to Jackson in early 1864 and used the city as his headquarters as his forces attacked Union positions in northern West Tennessee and Fort Pillow, a Union position on the Mississippi north of Memphis. Forrest returned to Jackson again later that year in preparation for an attack on Federal river traffic on the Tennessee River east of Paris and the supply base at Johnsonville.

With the emancipation of slaves and passage of US constitutional amendments granting suffrage to African-American males, Jackson's freedmen and formerly free people of color began to participate in the political system, but secret vigilante groups, such as the Ku Klux Klan, developed chapters in Tennessee and throughout the South that intimidated and attacked freedmen to exercise white supremacy. As Reconstruction continued, they worked to suppress the black Republican vote.

In the late 19th century, the white-dominated state legislature passed several laws that made voter registration and voting more difficult, including payment of a poll tax, which resulted in reducing voting by many blacks and poor whites. After Reconstruction, white violence increased against blacks. In 1886, Eliza Woods, an African-American woman, was lynched in Jackson after being accused of poisoning and killing her employer, Jessie Woolen. Woolen's husband later confessed to the crime. Two other African Americans were known to have been lynched by whites in Madison County in this period that extended into the early 20th century.

=== 20th century ===
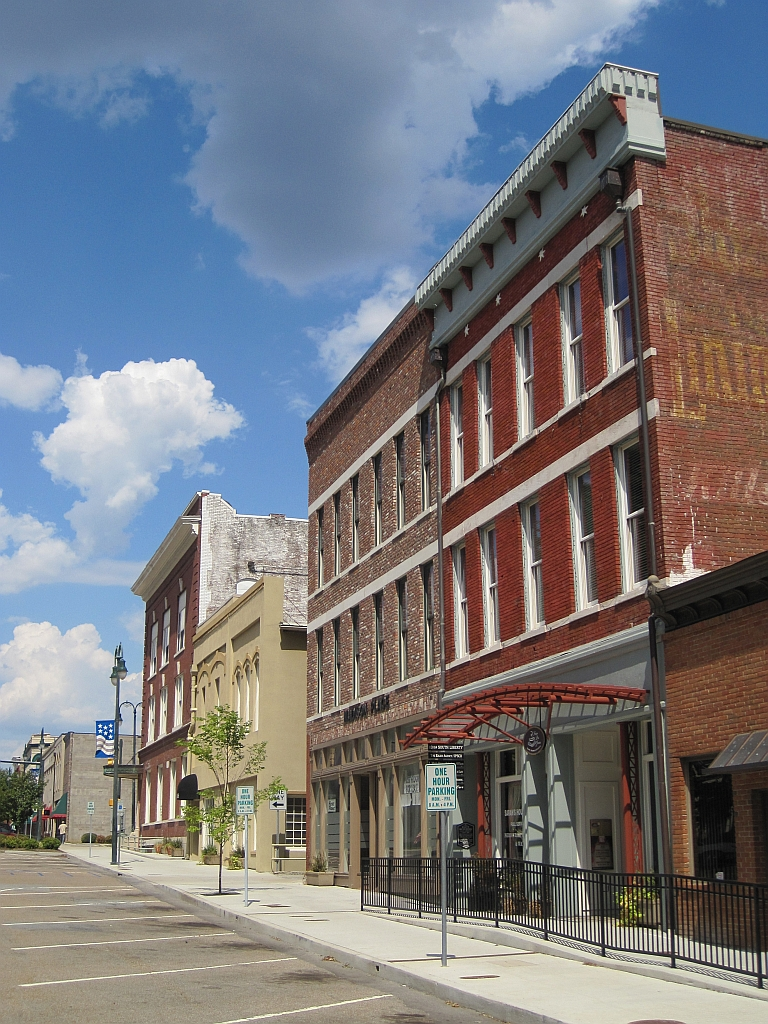
Downtown historic district

In 1915, Jackson was one of several cities in the state to adopt a commission form of government, changing its electoral scheme to at-large voting citywide for three designated positions, the mayor and two commissioners. This resulted in a government dominated by the majority, with no representatives elected from minority populations. (Other cities to make this change included Clarksville, Chattanooga, Knoxville, and Nashville.) Although in 1913 the state enacted a law enabling cities to adopt the commission form of government independently, Jackson was chartered by the state for this change. The commissioners each were allocated specific responsibilities, for instance, for the school system and city departments.

In the late 19th century, the state of Tennessee had already adopted residency requirements, voting process, and poll taxes that sharply reduced the ability of African Americans to register and vote. The city charter was amended to include run-off elections within two weeks in cases of one candidate not receiving a majority of votes. This created an extra burden on campaigns by less wealthy candidates. In Jackson, the total effect of these changes to the city electoral system was to reduce the ability of African Americans in the 20th century to elect candidates of their choice and to participate in the political system.

In 1977, the former company town of Bemis, just south of Jackson, was annexed by the city of Jackson.

In 1977, three city residents filed suit against the city in U.S. District Court, in Buchanan v. City of Jackson (1988), (683 F.Supp. 1515), challenging the structure and electoral system of the city government because the at-large voting had diluted the voting power of the city's significant minority of African American residents. (According to the 1980 Census, the city population was 49,074, of whom 16,847, or 34.3%, were black.) Since 1915, no black person had ever been elected to or served on the board of commissioners. The court found this commission electoral system to be discriminatory in effect. Over the decades, the African American minority was effectively closed out of city government. The case was appealed and affirmed; the defendants ultimately proposed a new system, approved in 1988 by the court. By a new city charter, in 1989 the city created a board of commission based on nine single-member districts for broader representation. The mayor is elected at-large.

Similar legal challenges to the electoral and city systems in Clarksville and Chattanooga led to changes in their city charters to establish more numerous members of a city council or board of commission, to be elected from single-member districts. As a result, more African American and women candidates have been elected as representatives from those jurisdictions.

The dissolution of the former government in Jackson resulted in the need for an elected city school board, since one of the commissioners had previously managed education. The city commissioners chose to consolidate their school system with that of the Madison County school system in 1990, creating the Jackson-Madison County School Board. This was also done to achieve desegregation goals. The nine-member board is elected from six districts across the county; three districts elect two members each and the other three each elect one member. All members are elected for four-year terms, with elections held on a staggered basis every two years. The demographics of the county in 2012 for major ethnic groups were 60.3% white and 37% African American. In 2008, the school system was still under a court order supervising its desegregation progress.

In the post-World War II era, the railroad industry underwent restructuring and mergers. (See section below). By the end of the 1960s, it sharply reduced passenger service to Jackson, with related losses of associated industrial jobs supporting the railroads, causing economic problems in the region.

=== 1999 to present ===
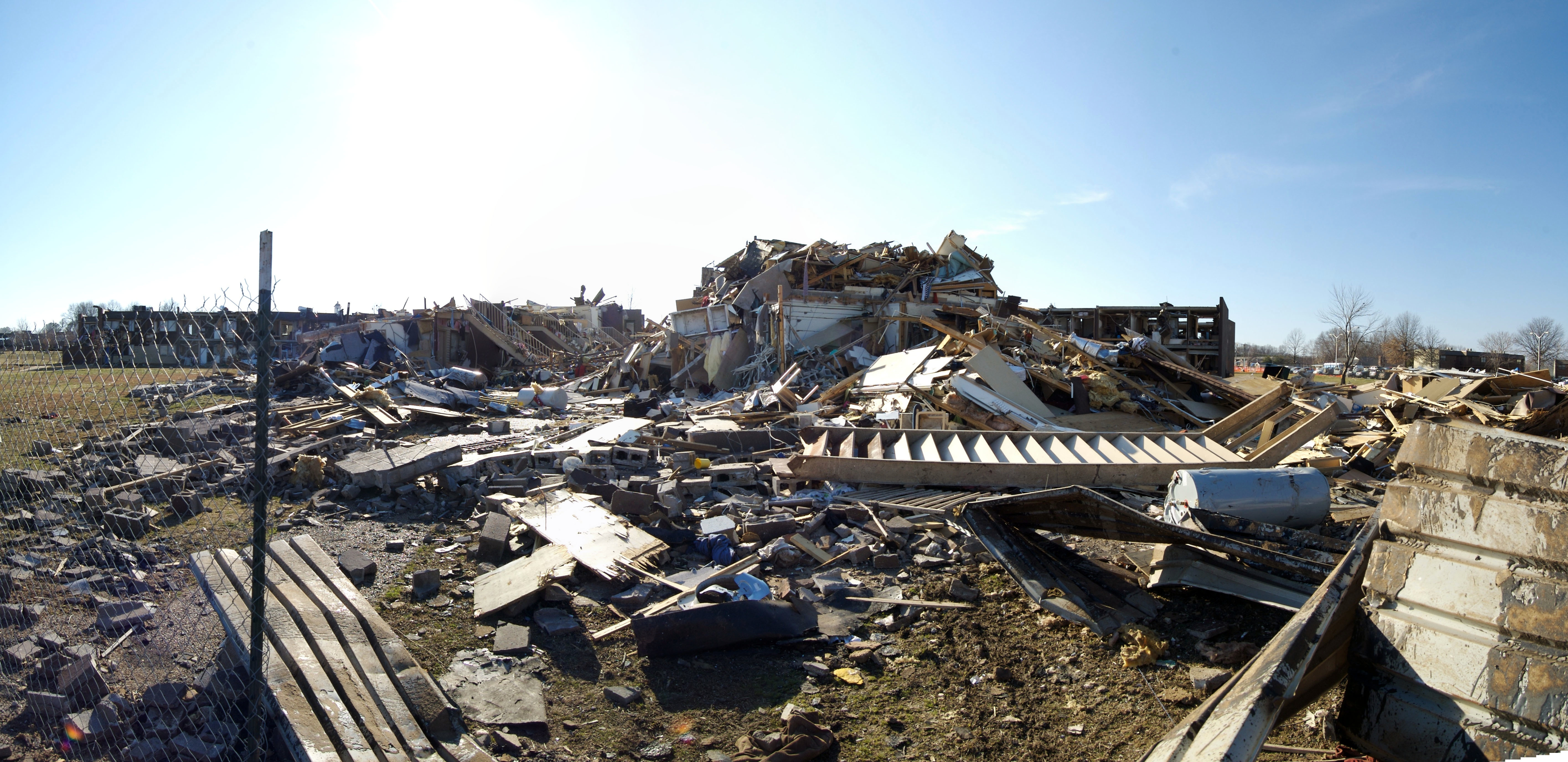
Destroyed dormitory building in February 2008.

Between 1999 and 2008, several violent tornadoes struck large portions of the city. The McKellar-Sipes Regional Airport was severely damaged in January 1999, a storm that resulted in 11 fatalities. The 1999 tornado also damaged the 30-acre (120,000 m^{2}) Riverside Cemetery, where 40 known Confederate soldiers, 140 unknowns, and many families of the founders of Jackson are buried. The cemetery's acres of old trees and many of the statues, monuments, and graves were damaged during the tornado.

Parts of the Union University campus were damaged in November 2002. The downtown area was devastated in May 2003 by an F4 tornado, with eight deaths. Many dormitories at the Union campus were demolished in a storm in February 2008.

On May 1, 2010, a severe thunderstorm hit Jackson, dropping 13 inches of rain in a short period of time. Flash floods destroyed many homes and streets.

=== Railroad history ===
Jackson developed rapidly just prior to the Civil War as a railroad junction and maintenance shop for several early railroads, including the Mississippi Central, the Tennessee Central and the Mobile and Ohio lines. Located over seventy miles east of Memphis, Jackson lies along the shortest rail route between Cairo, IL; Jackson, Mississippi (Mississippi's capital); and New Orleans, Louisiana. As the railroad was extended from the Great Lakes to the Gulf of Mexico, Jackson was perfectly situated as a station along the north–south line and to serve as a junction between the north–south line, and lines east and west between Memphis and Nashville, the major cities of West and Middle Tennessee.

The first was the Mobile and Ohio Railroad, which began in October 1849 in Mobile, Alabama. The line first entered Jackson in 1851. These tracks were completely destroyed during the Civil War. The line merged with the Gulf, Mobile and Northern Railroad in 1940 to become the Gulf, Mobile and Ohio Railroad. The second railroad to enter Jackson was the Mississippi Central & Tennessee. In 1873, the line was contracted and later controlled by the Illinois Central Railroad.

On December 29, 1886, the Tennessee Midland Railway received a charter to build a railroad from Memphis to the Virginia state line. The line from Memphis to Jackson was completed on June 1, 1888. In 1893, the Tennessee Midland went into receivership and was sold at foreclosure to the L&N Railroad. Around 1968, the remainder of the Tennessee Midland was abandoned east of Cordova with the exception of some track in Jackson. That track is now used to deliver goods to Jackson's east and west industrial parks.

The Tennessee Midland Railway Company line from Memphis to Jackson was the forerunner of the Nashville, Chattanooga and St. Louis Railway. This line was often referred to as the "NC" by locals. Like all other railroads to enter Jackson, it was built with funds subscribed by citizens and investors of Jackson. The first passenger train entered Jackson from Memphis on June 1, 1888. The highly profitable railroad was merged into the Louisville and Nashville Railroad following WW II. Eventually, the L&N was merged into and is now part of CSX Transportation.

A charter was granted by the State of Tennessee on August 16, 1910, and construction began on July l, 1911. The first sector extended from Jackson to the station of Tigrett, and by April 20, 1912, 38 miles (61 km) of the line were ready for operations. On June 16, the remaining 11-mile (18 km) sector was set into service, connecting Dyersburg with Jackson. When the line began operations in 1912, its president was Isaac B. Tigrett, a prominent young banker of Jackson. The railroad became an important local thoroughfare, used to transport much of the produce of the region to market in Jackson and Dyersburg. The Birmingham and Northwestern Railway Company had four locomotives, five passenger cars, and 92 freight cars. When Isaac B. Tigrett became president of the GM&N in 1920, he ceased to direct the affairs of the Birmingham and Northwestern Railroad Company. After he became president of the GM&O, the railroad was purchased and merged to become the Dyersburg branch.

=== Passenger trains in the 20th century ===
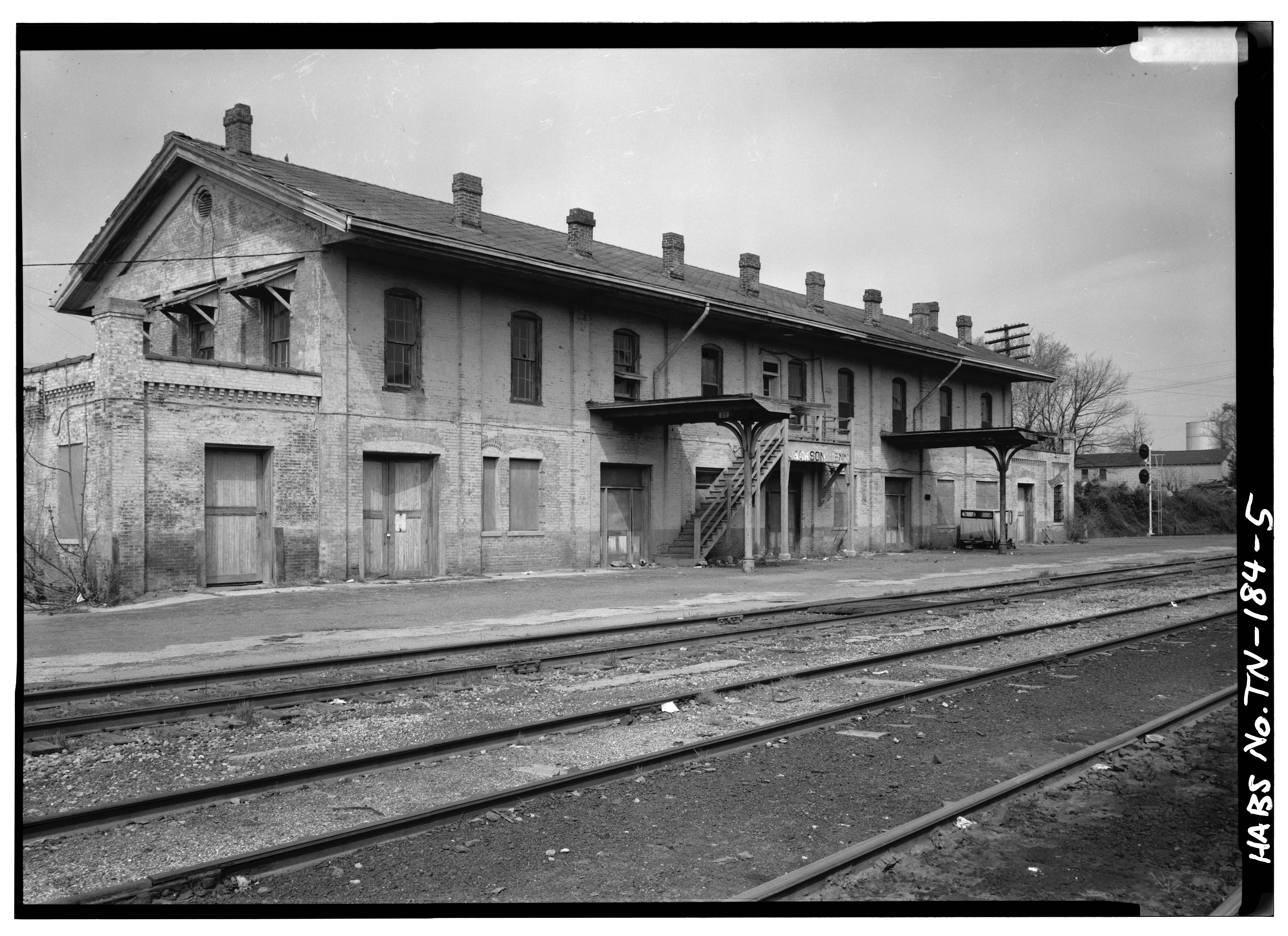
Jackson Union Station

Jackson had been a west Tennessee hub for passenger train service. Passengers had direct service to Memphis, Nashville, Meridian, Montgomery, Mobile, Birmingham, Jacksonville, Daytona, Miami, Centralia, Champaign-Urbana, Springfield, Chicago, St. Louis, and New Orleans. From the 1930s to the 1960s, multiple regularly scheduled passenger trains of the Gulf, Mobile and Ohio and the Illinois Central made stops at Union Station.

Gulf, Mobile and Ohio trains included:

- Gulf Coast Rebel (St. Louis, Missouri – Mobile, Alabama)
- The Rebel (Chicago – New Orleans, Louisiana)

Illinois Central trains included:

- The City of Miami (Chicago, Illinois – Miami, Florida)
- The Floridan (Chicago – Miami)
- The Seminole (Chicago – Jacksonville, Florida)
- Sunchaser (Chicago and St. Louis – Miami)

== Geography ==
According to the United States Census Bureau, the city has a total area of 49.5 square miles (128 km^{2}), all land.

=== Climate ===
Jackson has a humid subtropical climate (Cfa) within the Köppen climate classification, with hot, humid summers and cool winters.

Climate data for Jackson, Tennessee (Jackson Exp Stn), 1991–2020 normals, extremes 1895–present
Month	Jan	Feb	Mar	Apr	May	Jun	Jul	Aug	Sep	Oct	Nov	Dec	Year
Record high °F (°C)	79 (26)	83 (28)	92 (33)	91 (33)	102 (39)	104 (40)	107 (42)	110 (43)	106 (41)	99 (37)	88 (31)	80 (27)	110 (43)
Mean maximum °F (°C)	69.4 (20.8)	73.6 (23.1)	81.3 (27.4)	86.2 (30.1)	89.5 (31.9)	94.2 (34.6)	96.9 (36.1)	97.1 (36.2)	94.1 (34.5)	87.7 (30.9)	79.0 (26.1)	70.6 (21.4)	98.6 (37.0)
Mean daily maximum °F (°C)	48.5 (9.2)	53.1 (11.7)	62.3 (16.8)	72.5 (22.5)	80.2 (26.8)	87.5 (30.8)	90.6 (32.6)	90.3 (32.4)	84.8 (29.3)	74.2 (23.4)	61.4 (16.3)	51.7 (10.9)	71.4 (21.9)
Daily mean °F (°C)	37.9 (3.3)	41.7 (5.4)	50.6 (10.3)	60.1 (15.6)	69.0 (20.6)	76.7 (24.8)	80.0 (26.7)	78.9 (26.1)	72.4 (22.4)	60.9 (16.1)	49.2 (9.6)	41.3 (5.2)	59.9 (15.5)
Mean daily minimum °F (°C)	27.4 (−2.6)	30.4 (−0.9)	38.8 (3.8)	47.8 (8.8)	57.9 (14.4)	65.9 (18.8)	69.3 (20.7)	67.4 (19.7)	60.0 (15.6)	47.6 (8.7)	37.0 (2.8)	30.9 (−0.6)	48.4 (9.1)
Mean minimum °F (°C)	11.7 (−11.3)	16.0 (−8.9)	22.5 (−5.3)	32.3 (0.2)	43.4 (6.3)	54.7 (12.6)	60.7 (15.9)	58.0 (14.4)	45.3 (7.4)	32.5 (0.3)	22.3 (−5.4)	16.9 (−8.4)	9.2 (−12.7)
Record low °F (°C)	−18 (−28)	−21 (−29)	7 (−14)	23 (−5)	31 (−1)	41 (5)	45 (7)	44 (7)	30 (−1)	19 (−7)	0 (−18)	−21 (−29)	−21 (−29)
Average precipitation inches (mm)	4.29 (109)	4.65 (118)	5.75 (146)	5.46 (139)	5.33 (135)	5.08 (129)	4.99 (127)	3.57 (91)	4.07 (103)	3.97 (101)	4.45 (113)	5.28 (134)	56.89 (1,445)
Average snowfall inches (cm)	1.1 (2.8)	0.9 (2.3)	0.4 (1.0)	0.1 (0.25)	0.0 (0.0)	0.0 (0.0)	0.0 (0.0)	0.0 (0.0)	0.0 (0.0)	0.0 (0.0)	0.0 (0.0)	0.2 (0.51)	2.7 (6.9)
Average precipitation days (≥ 0.01 in)	11.0	10.2	11.7	10.9	11.0	9.9	9.7	8.3	7.8	9.0	10.3	11.7	121.5
Average snowy days (≥ 0.1 in)	0.6	0.6	0.1	0.0	0.0	0.0	0.0	0.0	0.0	0.0	0.0	0.2	1.5
Source: NOAA

== Demographics ==
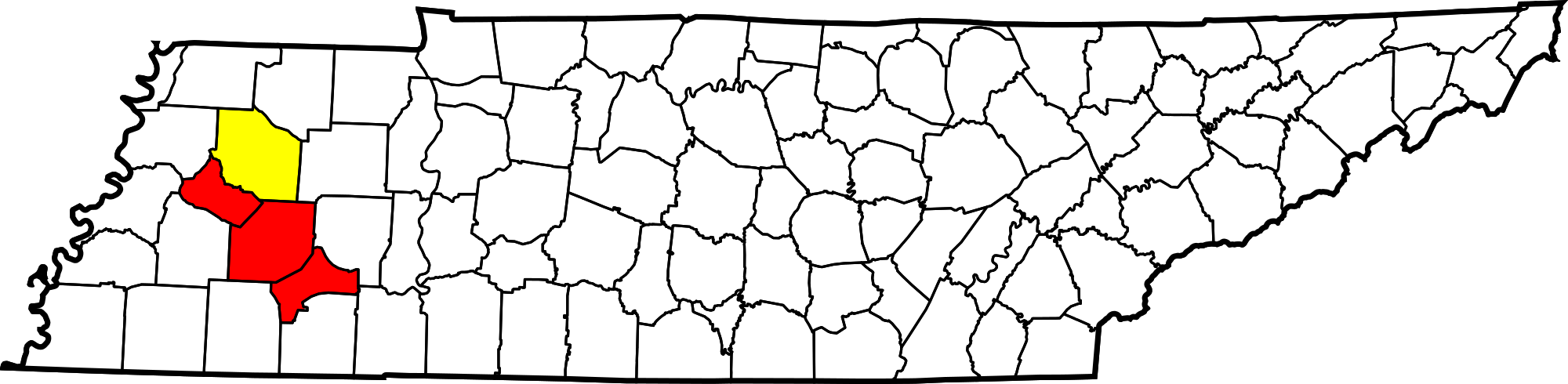
Location of the Jackson-Humboldt CSA and its components: Jackson Metropolitan Statistical Area Humboldt Micropolitan Statistical Area

Historical population
Census	Pop.	Note	%±
1850	1,006		—
1860	2,407		139.3%
1870	4,119		71.1%
1880	5,377		30.5%
1890	10,039		86.7%
1900	14,511		44.5%
1910	15,779		8.7%
1920	18,860		19.5%
1930	22,172		17.6%
1940	24,332		9.7%
1950	30,207		24.1%
1960	34,376		13.8%
1970	39,996		16.3%
1980	49,258		23.2%
1990	48,949		−0.6%
2000	59,643		21.8%
2010	65,211		9.3%
2020	68,205		4.6%

Jackson is the larger principal city of the Jackson-Humboldt combined statistical area, that includes the Jackson metropolitan area (Chester and Madison counties), and the Humboldt micropolitan area (Gibson County), which had a combined population of 180,509 at the 2020 census.

=== 2020 census ===
As of the 2020 census, Jackson had a population of 68,205 people in 27,108 households, including 16,075 families.

The median age was 37.3 years; 22.7% of residents were under 18 and 16.6% were 65 older. The female:male ratio was 1:0.872 overall and 1:0.834 for 18 and over.

Almost all of the residents lived in urban areas, while 1.1% lived in rural areas.

Of the 27,108 households in Jackson, 29.6% had children under 18 living in them, 36.3% were married-couple households, 18.9% were households with a male householder and no spouse or partner present, and 39.4% were households with a female householder and no spouse or partner present. About 32.8% of all households were made up of individuals, and 12.9% had someone living alone who was 65 or older.

The city had 30,187 housing units, of which 10.2% were vacant. The homeowner vacancy rate was 2.0% and the rental vacancy rate was 9.4%.

Racial composition as of the 2020 census
Race	Number	Percentage
White	31,850	46.7%
Black or African American	30,038	44.0%
American Indian and Alaska Native	186	0.3%
Asian	1,103	1.6%
Native Hawaiian and other Pacific Islander	13	0.0%
Some other race	1,906	2.8%
Two or more races	3,109	4.6%
Hispanic or Latino (of any race)	3,487	5.1%

=== 2010 census ===
In the 2010 census, 65,211 people, 25,191 households, and 15,951 families were residing in the city. The population density was 1,317 inhabitants per square mile (508/km^{2}). The 28,052 housing units had an average density of 566.3 per square mile (218.6/km^{2}). Since the 2010 Census, the city has added 9.4459 (24.5/km^{2}). The racial makeup of the city was 49.2% White, 45.07% African American, 0.2% Native American, 1.2% Asian, 0.02% Pacific Islander, 2.3% from other races, and 1.5% from two or more races. Hispanics or Latinos of any race were 4.0% of the population.

Of the 25,191 households, 29.7% had children under 18 living with them, 37.6% were married couples living together, 21.4% had a female householder with no husband present, and 36.7% were not families. About 30.8% of all households were made up of individuals, and 10.59% had someone living alone who was 65 or older. The average household size was 2.42, and the average family size was 3.03.

In the city, the age distribution was 24.7% under 18, 13.4% from 18 to 24, 25.4% from 25 to 44, 23.8% from 45 to 64, and 12.7% who were 65 or older. The median age was 33.8 years. For every 100 females, there were 87.4 males. For every 100 females 18 and over, there were 81.7 males.

The median income in the city for a household was $38,169 and for a family was $45,938. Males had a median income of $41,085 versus $30,436 for females. The per capita income for the city was $23,762. About 15.6% of families and 21.6% of the population were below the poverty line, including 36% of those under 18 and 8.24% of those 65 or over.

=== Crime ===
As of 2020, the Jackson metropolitan area ranked as the 38th-worst in the United States, with 624.6 violent crimes per 100,000 residents.

According to Morgan Quitno's 2010 Metropolitan Crime Rate Rankings the Jackson metropolitan area had the 13th-highest crime rate in the United States. In 2007, Jackson ranked as the 9th-most dangerous city. In 2006, it had been listed as the 18th-most dangerous.

== Arts and culture ==
=== Rock-A-Billy Hall of Fame ===
Jackson was the site of the now-permanently closed International Rock-a-Billy Hall of Fame Museum, which recognized the contributions of Tennessee musicians to this genre.

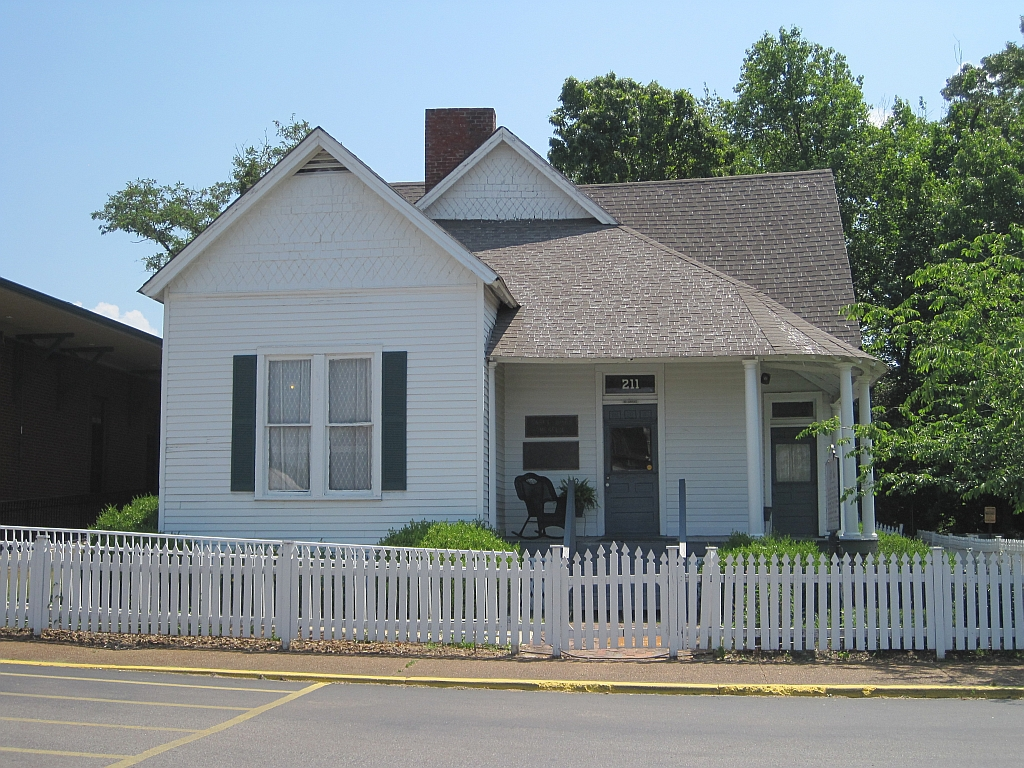
Casey Jones Home & Museum on the 45 Highway Bypass

=== Casey Jones Home & Railroad Museum ===
In 1956, the city of Jackson purchased the Chester Street home of famed locomotive engineer Casey Jones to turn it into a museum and tourist attraction. The museum opened to the public on April 30, and Governor Frank Clement was the main speaker for the ceremony. In 1978, a proposal to move the home and museum north to a plot of land next to Interstate 40 was approved, though with much debate. The building was moved that winter.

=== Ned R. McWherter West Tennessee Cultural Arts Center ===
As of April 2022, a large portion of the historic downtown area has been officially designated by the Jackson City Council as the Arts District; it is home to the Ned R. McWherter West Tennessee Cultural Arts Center, known locally as "the Ned", as well as the Carnegie Center for Arts and History. Some of the art displayed in the area includes murals, performance-art shows, galleries, live concerts, and theatrical/ballet productions. The district is also home to a number of small shops.

=== Carl Perkins Civic Center ===
Built in 1973, the Carl Perkins Civic Center is a multipurpose events facility with seating for 2,200. It is named for singer Carl Perkins. The center is located on the south side of the downtown square.

== Sports ==
=== College Athletics ===
The city of Jackson is home to a number of institutions of higher learning which offer collegiate sports, including Union University, Lane College, and Jackson State Community College.

Union University has won six national titles (NAIA- 1998, 2005, 2006, 2009, 2010, and NCCAA- 2014) in women's basketball. In 2018, the Lady Bulldogs advanced to the Final Four of the NCAA Division II women's basketball tournament. In addition to success in women's basketball, Union boasts NCCAA national titles in volleyball (2003), men's soccer (2004), and softball (2001, 2002, 2004, 2013).

=== Minor League Baseball ===
The Jackson Generals, a Double-A Minor League Baseball team of the Southern League played at The Ballpark at Jackson from 1998 to 2020. In conjunction with Major League Baseball's reorganization of the minor leagues after the 2020 season, the Generals were not invited to serve as any team's affiliate, effectively ending their run in affiliated baseball. After a legal battle with the city, the Generals ceased operations in 2021 after an arbiter ruled in favor of the city.

Originally known as the West Tenn Diamond Jaxx, the team changed its name to the Generals in 2011. The new name was in reference to the Jackson Generals, which played in the Kentucky–Illinois–Tennessee League from 1935 to 1942 and 1950 to 1954. The original Generals were preceded by teams called the Jackson Jays (1926), Jackson Giants (1925), Jackson Blue Jays (1924), Jackson Climbers (1911), and Jackson Railroaders (1903).

With the Generals gone in 2021, the Winnipeg Goldeyes of the independent American Association temporarily moved their operations to Jackson due to COVID-19 restrictions shutting down the U.S.-Canada border, preventing them from playing in their normal home, Shaw Park in Winnipeg. The Goldeyes played 33 games in Jackson before being given permission by the Canadian government to return across the border on August 3.

In 2022, the city of Jackson welcomed back professional baseball in the form of the Jackson Rockabillys of the Prospect League. The Rockabillys play in city-owned The Ballpark at Jackson, which was previously occupied by the city's minor league franchise.

=== Other sports ===
The Hub City Hurricanes of the IBL played in Jackson for one season in 2007.

Jackson Jammers (1992) of the Global Basketball Association (GBA) starting out as the Music City Jammers (1991–92)

In 1974, a Little League team from Jackson played in the Little League World Series in Williamsport, Pennsylvania – to date, the only team from West Tennessee to qualify.

From 1990 to 2011, Jackson hosted the NAIA Women's Division I National Championship basketball tournament in the Oman Arena.

The Jackson TN Underdawgs have participated in The Basketball Tournament since 2016. The Underdawgs have played spoiler in multiple years, defeating some of the tournament's top-ranked teams. In 2021, while ranked the 15 seed, the Underdawgs defeated the number 2 seed in their region. In 2016, they upset the number 1 seed in their region.

== Parks and recreation ==
- Jackson hosts the Miss Tennessee Volunteer Pageant and the Miss Volunteer America Pageant.
- West Tennessee Healthcare Sportsplex is a travel baseball and softball complex completed in 2007.
- A tennis complex in northern Jackson hosts the City Closed tennis tournament.
- Jackson is home to Rusty's TV & Movie Car Museum, which hosts a collection of cars that have been shown in TV and film, including the green Mitsubishi Eclipse driven by Paul Walker in the original Fast and Furious.

== Education ==
=== Colleges and universities ===
- Jackson State Community College
- Lane College
- Union University
- University of Memphis at Lambuth
- University of Tennessee at Martin – Jackson Center
- Tennessee College of Applied Technology at Jackson - near the city but in an unincorporated area

=== Primary and secondary schools ===
K-12 public schools in the city and county are operated by the consolidated Jackson-Madison County School System. High schools include:

- Jackson Central-Merry Early College High School
- Liberty Technology Magnet High School
- Madison Academic Magnet High School
- North Side High School
- South Side High School

Specialist schools operated by the State of Tennessee include:

- West Tennessee School for the Deaf

Private schools include:

- Jackson Christian School
- Trinity Christian Academy
- University School of Jackson

== Media ==
=== Newspaper ===
Jackson is served by one daily, The Jackson Sun, which is delivered to 13 counties in total and is considered one of West Tennessee's major newspapers.

=== Television ===
As of the 2015–2016 television season, the Jackson television market is the smallest market in Tennessee and 176th overall by Nielsen Media Research. The market is served by three major commercial stations: WBBJ-TV 7 (ABC, with CBS/MeTV on DT3), WJKT 16 (Fox), and WNBJ-LD 39 (NBC). Jackson is also served by a PBS member station, WLJT 11, as well as several other low-power stations (among them Antenna TV/MyNetworkTV affiliate WYJJ-LD 27).

=== Radio ===
Jackson is serviced by 28 FM and 8 AM radio stations.

== Infrastructure ==
=== Transportation ===
==== Ground transportation ====
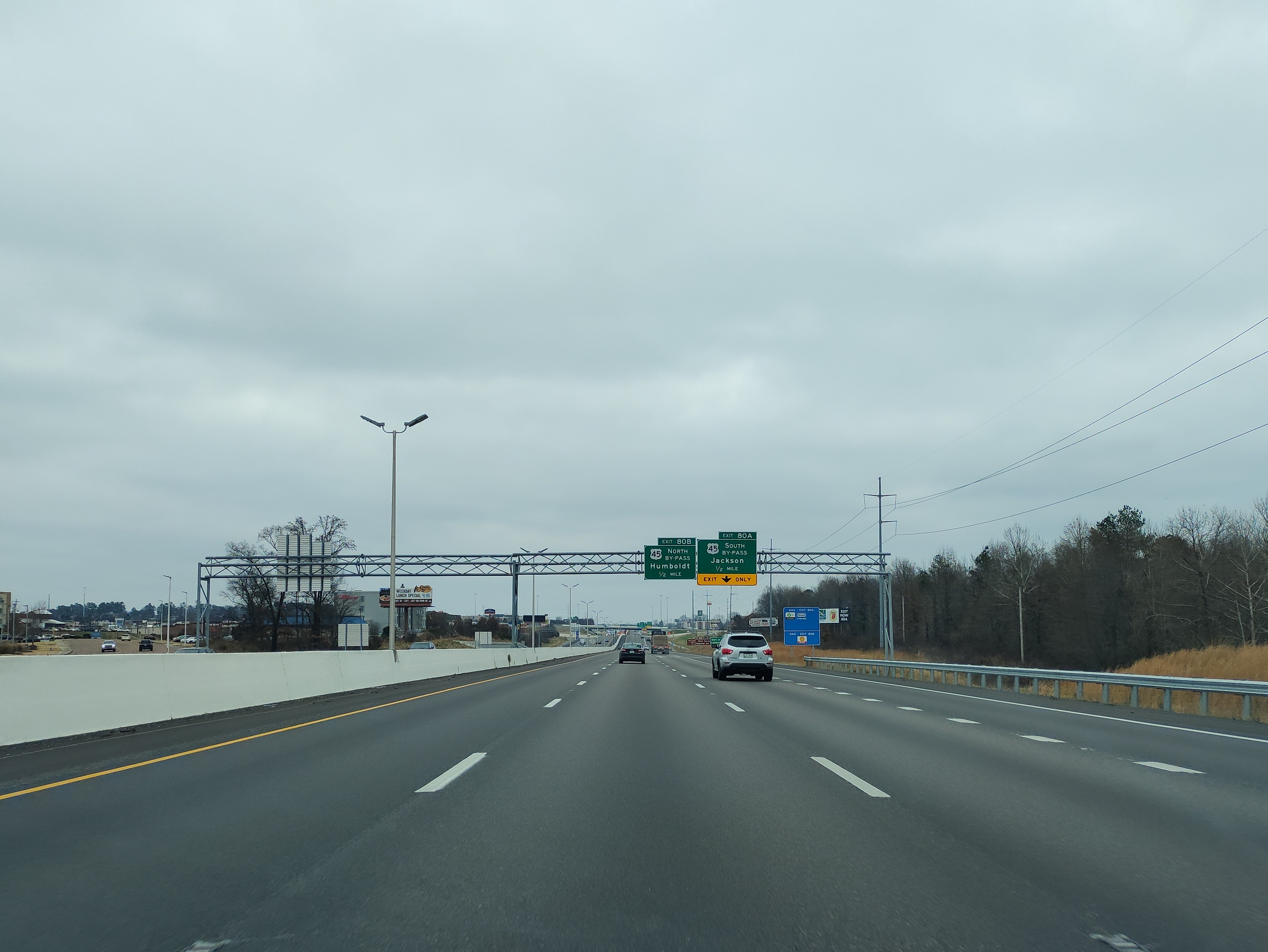
I-40 in Jackson.

Interstate 40 (I-40) runs through the city in an east–west direction, connecting the city with Memphis to the west and Nashville to the east. I-40 has six exits in the city. U.S. Route 45 runs in a north–south direction, and splits into two routes north of Jackson: US 45E connects the city to Humboldt to the north and US 45W connects to Milan to the northeast. US 45, which is known locally as Highland Avenue, connects the city to Henderson to the southeast.

A bypass route of US 45 (known as the Keith Short Bypass) goes through the western part of the city. U.S. Route 412 runs east from Lexington in Henderson County northwest to Alamo and Dyersburg, where it connects to I-55 to provide access to St. Louis. State Route 18 (SR 18) connects the city to Bolivar to the southwest. U.S. Route 70 (State Route 1) parallels I-40 and runs east to west between Huntingdon and Brownsville.

The Jackson Transit Authority line provides intracity bus service, while the Greyhound Bus line provides intercity service.

==== Air service ====
McKellar-Sipes Regional Airport (MKL) serves the city.

=== Healthcare ===
West Tennessee Healthcare (Jackson-Madison County General Hospital District), created by a law passed by the Tennessee General Assembly in 1949, serves as the public hospital system of the city of Jackson. The city appoints some of the members of the board of directors.

== Notable people ==
- Jessi Alexander, singer/songwriter
- Allison Alderson, former Miss Tennessee
- Monroe Dunaway Anderson, born in Jackson, was a cotton trader and capitalist, whose financial endowment helped found the Anderson, Clayton & Company in Oklahoma City, Oklahoma, in 1904, the M. D. Anderson Foundation in Houston, Texas, and the University of Texas MD Anderson Cancer Center in Houston
- Micajah Autry, hero of the Alamo, practiced law in Jackson from 1831 to 1835
- Big Maybelle, rhythm and blues singer
- Dick Davis, football player
- Gene Evans, actor, relocated to Jackson after appearing in the film Walking Tall
- Steve Fossett, aviator, first man to fly solo, nonstop around the world in a hot air balloon, born in Jackson
- Greg Goff, head baseball coach at Purdue
- Jabari Greer, football player
- Hayes Nance, orthodontist
- Thomas Harris, author noted for his bestseller The Silence of the Lambs, born in Jackson
- Sylvester Hicks, NFL player
- W. S. Holland, drummer for Carl Perkins and Johnny Cash
- Joe Hunter, pianist, one of the Funk Brothers studio band, played on many Motown hits in the 1960s
- Adam Huntsman, lawyer and politician, defeated David Crockett for Congress in 1835
- Luther Ingram, singer
- Casey Jones, Illinois Central Railroad engineer, who before colliding with a stalled freight train near Vaughan, Mississippi, told his fireman to jump to safety; Jones died at the throttle and saved the lives of all the passengers
- Christopher Jones, actor, born in Jackson
- Ed "Too Tall" Jones, football player
- Jacoby Jones, football player attended Lane College in Jackson
- Van Jones, environmental advocate, civil-rights activist, lawyer, born in Jackson
- Richard D. King, architect
- Fred Lane, football player attended Lane College in Jackson
- Denise LaSalle, blues singer, known as "Queen of the Blues", resident and business owner in Jackson for many years
- Brandon Lay, singer-songwriter
- Ron Lollar, Tennessee state representative
- Wink Martindale, game-show host
- Willis S. Matthews, U.S. Army major general
- Mike Norton, comic-book artist and writer, known for his work on Battlepug
- Kenny Parchman, rockabilly musician
- JR Payne, women's basketball head coach, University of Colorado
- Carl Perkins, singer, lived for years in Jackson; the Civic Center is named for him
- Casey Prather (born 1991), basketball player in the Israeli Basketball Premier League
- Lauren Pritchard, soul singer, songwriter, and actress, known by her stage name Lolo; born and spent her childhood in Jackson
- Ron Reynolds, Texas politician, born in Jackson in 1973
- Joe Rogers, Sr. co-founder of Waffle House, born in Jackson in 1919
- Josh Robbins, HIV/AIDS activist, blogger, social-media marketer, talent agent, grew up in Jackson
- Ryan Rolison, MLB pitcher
- Gil Scott-Heron, musician born in Chicago, spent his early childhood in Jackson, at the home of his maternal grandmother
- Charles Alexander Shaw, United States District Court judge
- Trey Teague, football player
- Isaac Burton Tigrett, co-founder of the Hard Rock Cafe chain of themed restaurants
- Al Wilson, football player

== See also ==
- Captain H.P. Farrar House
- Mayoral elections in Jackson, Tennessee
