= Henderson Central League team =

Henderson
- 1897; Henderson, Kentucky

Minor league affiliations
- Class: Class C
- League: Central League

Major league affiliations
- Team: Unaffiliated

Minor league titles
- Pennants (0): None

Team data
- Name: Henderson
- Ballpark: Henderson Fair Grounds

Henderson was a Minor League Baseball team that played in the Class C Central League in 1897. They began the season in Nashville, Tennessee, as the Nashville Centennials, but relocated to Henderson, Kentucky, after June 3. They played their home games at the city's fair grounds for the remainder of the season.

== History ==
The team began the 1897 Central League season as the Nashville Centennials of Nashville, Tennessee, but suffered financial problems brought on principally by poor attendance. They played their final game in Nashville on June 3. The Centennials left town in second place with a 18–14 (.563) record. League president George Simons announced the league's intention to transfer the club to Decatur, Illinois. The league took possession of the team and placed it in the hands of catcher Frank Belt. He would lead the team until it could be permanently established in its new city.

After an off day on June 4, the team played a series each against the Cairo Egyptians and Paducah Little Colonels, where they were still referred to as Nashville. Meanwhile, Simons was still trying to place the former Nashville franchise in a new city. Decatur, the intended spot, refused to accept the team and its over $400 debt in unpaid player salaries and forthwith demolished their ballpark. Simons next turned to Springfield, Illinois; Owensboro, Kentucky; and Henderson, Kentucky. The league gave Nashville a five-day window to get together the funds to guarantee finishing the season, but it failed to do so.

Instead, the citizens of Henderson gathered enough money to have the team transferred there. Their first game as the Henderson club was played on June 13 on the road against the Evansville Brewers. They won, 5–4, with the battery of Will Geralds and Belt. A. D. Rogers, owner of the Henderson opera house and president of the city's fair association, was named the new manager. The team's home games were played at the Henderson Fair Grounds. They defeated Evansville, 6–2, in their Henderson home opener on June 22.

On the morning of July 20, the Washington Browns disbanded amid poor attendance and severe debt. Evansville and the Terre Haute Hottentots dropped out of the league later that day. The Central League was finished. Henderson played its final league game on July 19 at Terre Haute, a 5–4 loss. At the cessation of play, the team was in second place with a record of 39–31 (.557), one-and-a-half games behind Evansville. They played one final exhibition game against a team from Princeton, Indiana, on July 21, winning 5–0, before disbanding.

== Season results ==
1897 Central League standings (July 20)
Team	Games	Won	Lost	Win %	Finish	GB
Evansville Brewers	71	41	30	.577	1st	—
Nashville/Henderson Centennials	70	39	31	.557	2nd	1 1/2
Washington Browns	65	33	32	.508	3rd	5
Terre Haute Hottentots	67	31	36	.463	4th	8
Paducah Little Colonels	68	31	37	.456	5th	8 1/2
Cairo Egyptians	69	30	39	.435	6th	10

== Notable players ==
Three players also played in at league one game in Major League Baseball during their careers. These player were:

- Theodore Conover
- Pat Dillard
- Charlie Petty
