= Henderson Hens =

- 1896–1916; (1896–1897, 1903–1905, 1911–1914, 1916); Henderson, Kentucky

Minor league affiliations
- Class: Independent (1896); Class C (1897); Class D (1903–1905, 1911–1914, 1916)
- League: Kentucky–Indiana League (1896); Pennyrile League (1896); Central League (1897); Kentucky–Illinois–Tennessee League (1903–1905, 1911–1914, 1916)

Major league affiliations
- Team: None

Minor league titles
- League titles (0): None

Team data
- Name: Henderson (1896–1897); Henderson Blue Birds (1903–1904); Henderson Hens (1905, 1911–1914, 1916)
- Ballpark: Fairgrounds Park (1903–1905, 1911–1914, 1916)

The Henderson Hens were a minor league baseball teams based in Henderson, Kentucky. In various seasons between 1896 and 1916, Henderson teams played as members of the Kentucky–Indiana League and Pennyrile League in 1896, Central League in 1897 and Kentucky–Illinois–Tennessee League (1903–1905, 1911–1914, 1916).

Henderson hosted home minor league games at Fairgrounds Park.

Today, Henderson hosts the Henderson Flash, a summer collegiate baseball team.

== History ==
Minor league play in Henderson, Kentucky began in 1896, with the team playing in two leagues. The Henderson team began the season in the Pennyrile League, which folded and then restarted on June 22, 1896, renamed as the Kentucky–Indiana League. Henderson had a 9–15 record in the Kentucky–Indiana League when the team disbanded on August 3, 1896. The league folded shortly after, with Henderson finishing 6.0 games behind the first place Madisonville. The Henderson managers were Phil Reccius and Coleman.

In 1897, Henderson resumed minor league play during the season. On June 13, 1897, Henderson became members of the Class C level Central League when the Nashville, Tennessee based team transferred to Henderson with a 21–18 record. The Central League permanently disbanded on July 20, 1897, with Henderson in second place. The Nashville/Henderson team finished with a 39–31 overall record, ending the season 1.5 games behind the first place Evansville Brewers.

In 1903, the Henderson Blue Birds became charter members of the eight–team Class D level Kentucky–Illinois–Tennessee League, which became known informally as the KITTY League. In the first season of play in the new league, the Blue Birds finished with a 48–60 record in the final standings. Henderson placed fourth, finishing 19.0 games behind the first place Cairo Egyptians, playing the season under manager Peter Webber.

The Henderson Blue Birds returned to play in 1904 and again placed fourth in the Kentucky–Illinois–Tennessee League standings. Henderson compiled a record of 54–68 under manager Clyde McNutt. The Blue Birds finished 19.5 games behind the first place Paducah Indians in the final standings.

In 1905, the Henderson Hens continued Kentucky–Illinois–Tennessee League play, but folded during the season. On July 18, 1905, the Hens had a record of 29–47 under managers Jake Zimbro and Hary Kubitz when the franchise folded. The league then halted play on August 17, 1905, due to the Yellow Fever epidemic.

The Henderson Hens rejoined the 1911 Kentucky–Illinois–Tennessee League during the season. On June 20, 1911, the McLeansboro Miners, with a 19–15 record moved to Henderson. The Hens placed third in the eight–team league with an overall record of 46–43. The team finished 12.0 games behind the first place Hopkinsville Hoppers. Miles Bradshaw and Stelle managed the McLeansboro/Henderson team in 1911.

The 1912 Hens placed second in the Kentucky–Illinois–Tennessee League. With a record of 52–48, Henderson finished 17.5 games behind the first place Clarksville Rebels in the six–team league. Offa Neal and Ward Snyder managed the 1912 Hens. On July 21, 1912, Fred Ostendorf of Henderson pitched a no-hitter against the Cairo Egyptians. Ostendorf and Henderson won the game 2–0.

Continuing Kentucky–Illinois–Tennessee League play, the 1913 Henderson Hens finished with a record of 70–55. The team placed fourth in the standings under managers Dave Anderson and Ward Snyder. The Hens finished 9.0 games behind the champion Paducah Chiefs. On August 7, 1913, Henderson's Tom Rogers threw a no–hitter in a 1–0 Henderson victory over the Owensboro Distillers.

The 1914 Henderson Hens placed third in the Kentucky–Illinois–Tennessee League. Under returning manager Ward Snyder, Henderson finished with a 64–58 record. The Hens finished 12.5 games behind the first place Cairo Egyptians in the six–team league. James Leach of the Hens threw a perfect game in a 7–inning win on August 29, 1914. Leach was victorious over the Cairo Egyptians 1–0. The Kentucky–Illinois–Tennessee did not return to play in the 1915 season.

In their final season of play, the 1916 Henderson Hens were in second place when the Kentucky–Illinois–Tennessee League folded. The league disbanded August 4, 1916, with a record of 44–30, playing the season under manager Connie Walsh. Henderson finished 6.0 games behind the first place Clarksville Volunteers.

Henderson, Kentucky has not hosted another minor league team. Beginning in 2017, Henderson was home to the "Henderson Flash", a collegiate summer baseball team, playing as members of the Ohio Valley League.

== The ballpark ==
The Henderson minor league teams were noted to have played home games at the Henderson Fairgrounds Park. The ballpark was located at the Henderson Fair Grounds, Fairgrounds Street and Fair Street, Henderson, Kentucky.

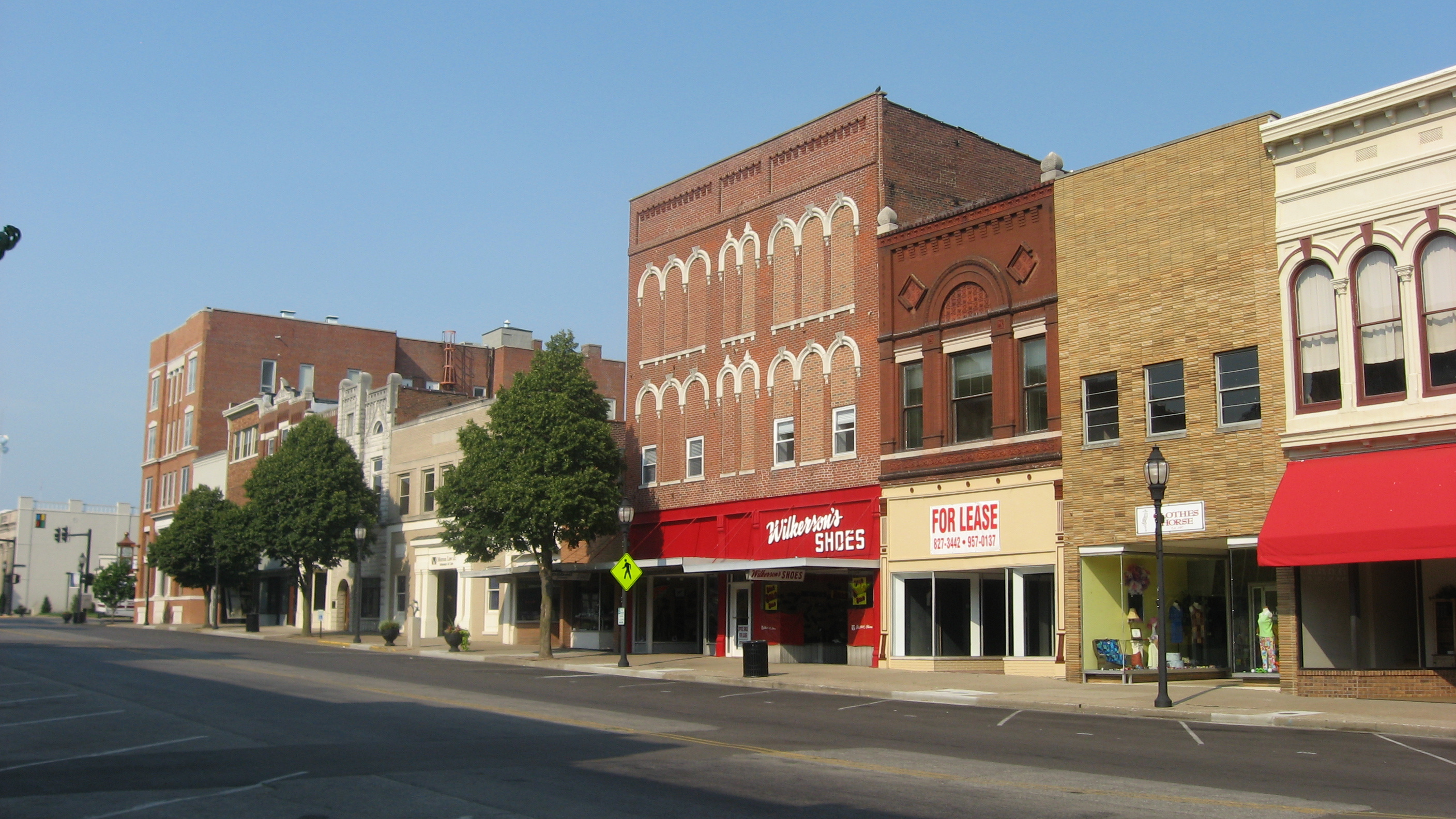
(2012) North Main, National Register of Historic Places. Henderson, Kentucky

== Timeline ==
Year(s)	# Yrs.	Team	Level	League	Ballpark
1896 (1)	1	Henderson	Independent	Kentucky–Indiana League	Fairgrounds Park
1896 (2)	1	Henderson	Independent	Pennyrile League	Fairgrounds Park
1897	1	Henderson	Class C	Central League	Fairgrounds Park
1903–1904	2	Henderson Blue Birds	Class D	Kentucky–Illinois–Tennessee League	Fairgrounds Park
1905, 1911–1914, 1916	6	Henderson Hens	Class D	Kentucky–Illinois–Tennessee League	Fairgrounds Park

== Year–by–year records ==
Year	Record	Finish	Manager	Playoffs/notes
1896 (1)	7–17	NA	Phil Reccius / Coleman	Pennyrite League; League folded June 22
1896 (2)	9–15	6th	Phil Reccius / Coleman	Team folded August 3
1897	39–41	7th	NA	Nashville (21–18) moved to Henderson June 13; League folded July 20
1903	48–60	4th	Peter Webber	No playoffs held
1904	54–68	4th	Clyde McNutt	No playoffs held
1905	29–47	--	Jake Zimbro / Hary Kubitz	Team folded July 18
1911	46–43	3rd	Miles Bradshaw / Stelle	McLeansboro (19–15) moved to Henderson June 20
1912	52–48	2nd	Offa Neal / Ward Snyder	No playoffs held
1913	70–55	4th	Dave Anderson / Ward Snyder	No playoffs held
1914	64–58	3rd	Ward Snyder	No playoffs held
1916	44–30	2nd	Connie Walsh	League folded August 4

== Notable alumni ==
- George Beck (1912)
- Theodore Conover (1897)
- Jerry D'Arcy (1912)
- Pat Dillard (1897)
- Charlie French (1905)
- Frank Freund (1896)
- Offa Neal (1913, MGR)
- Fred Ostendorf (1912–1913)
- Charlie Petty (1897)
- Ollie Pickering (1913)
- Frank Quinn (1905)
- Phil Reccius (1896, MGR)
- Tom Rogers (1913)
- George Tomer (1913–1914)
- Tink Turner (1913)
- Connie Walsh (1916, MGR)

== See also ==
- Henderson Hens players
- Henderson (minor league baseball) players
- Henderson Centennials players

== External references ==
Henderson - Baseball Reference
