= Nashville Seraphs =

Former Minor League Baseball team in Nashville, Tennessee

- 1895; Nashville, Tennessee
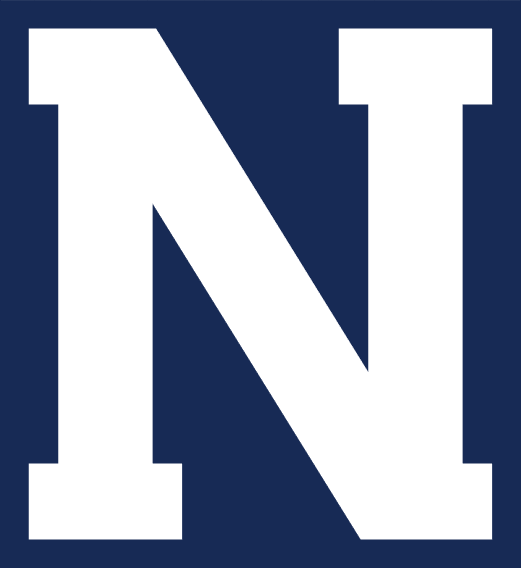

Minor league affiliations
- Class: Class B
- League: Southern League

Minor league titles
- Pennants (1): 1895

Team data
- Name: Nashville Seraphs
- Colors: Navy, white
- Ballpark: Athletic Park
- President: R. L. C. White
- Manager: George Stallings

The Nashville Seraphs, often known as the Nashvilles, were a minor league baseball team that played in the Class B Southern League in 1895. They were located in Nashville, Tennessee, and played their home games at Athletic Park, later known as Sulphur Dell. The club won the Southern League pennant in their only season, becoming the city's first minor league baseball team to win a league championship.

The Nashvilles spent the majority of the season at or near the top of the league standings and held an above-.500 winning percentage on all but Opening Day. From August 15 to the season finale on September 3, the Seraphs won 20 consecutive games, which propelled them from seven games out of first place to a tie with the Atlanta Crackers atop the standings. Both teams possessed .670 records and asserted to be the rightful pennant winners. At the league's annual winter meeting that December, nearly four months later, Nashville was declared the Southern League champion for 1895.

The team was managed by George Stallings and included other former and future major league players Frank Butler, Art Herman, Lefty Marr, Tom McCreery, Sam Moran, Bert Myers, Jim Ritz, and Mike Trost. Butler and Moran were sold to the New York Giants and Pittsburgh Pirates, respectively, during the season. Stallings and Moran, as well as George Cleve, played for the Nashville Tigers, the city's previous club, in 1894. Marr also played for the Nashville Americans, the city's first team, in 1885 and 1886.

== History ==
=== Formation ===
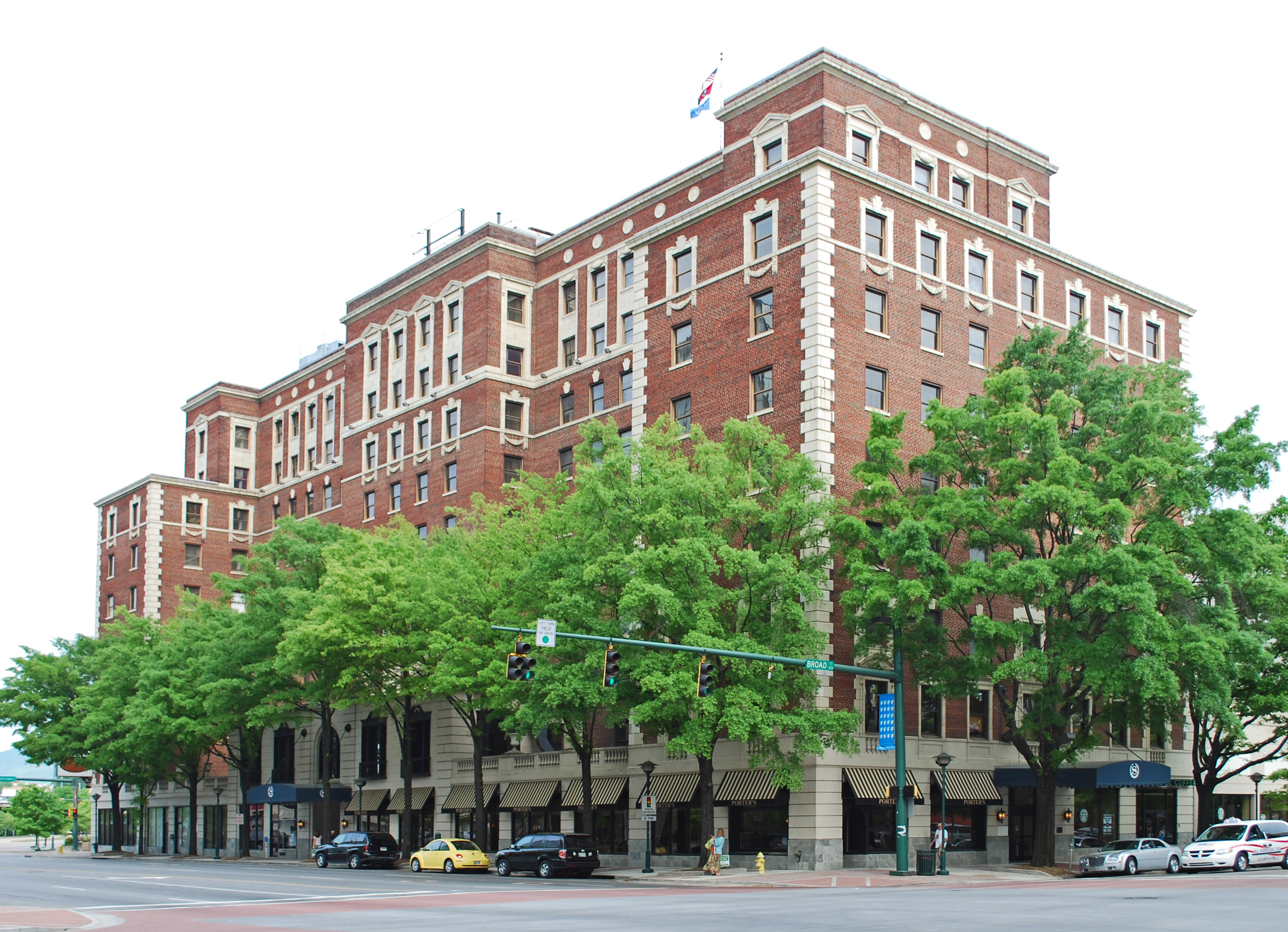
A Southern League franchise was granted to Nashville on January 14, 1895, at The Read House Hotel in Chattanooga.

Professional baseball was first played in Nashville, Tennessee, by the Nashville Americans, who were charter members of the original Southern League from 1885 to 1886 and played their home games at Sulphur Spring Park, later renamed Athletic Park and Sulphur Dell. This ballpark was to be the home of Nashville's minor league teams through 1963. In 1887, the city's Southern League team was called the Nashville Blues. The Nashville Tigers competed in the same league from 1893 to 1894. The Southern League disbanded in July 1894, as the result of league-wide financial instability brought on by the expense of travel and poor attendance.

In the ensuing months, baseball leaders across the South considered which cities to include in the next iteration of the Southern League. Representatives met at The Read House Hotel in Chattanooga on January 14 to reorganize for the 1895 season. Membership was granted to clubs in Atlanta, Chattanooga, Evansville, Little Rock, Memphis, Montgomery, Nashville, and New Orleans, thus lessening the expense of travel incurred in the past with the inclusion of cities such as Charleston and Savannah. Each of the eight teams paid a US$1,000 deposit to guarantee they would play the entire season. They also pledged to pay dues of $100 per month plus 3% of total gate receipts for a sinking fund. Player salaries were capped at $1,000 per team. The Nashville Baseball Association elected R. L. C. White, physician and prominent figure in the Tennessee press, to serve as president of the Nashville club.

Nashville's team has come to be known as the Seraphs. Though there are no contemporary references to this moniker, the May 4, 1895, edition of the Nashville Banner referred to the team as "Stallings' cherubs". At the time, baseball clubs were often called only by the names of their cities. Newspapers generally referred to the team as simply Nashville, the Nashville club, or the Nashvilles.

=== Spring training ===
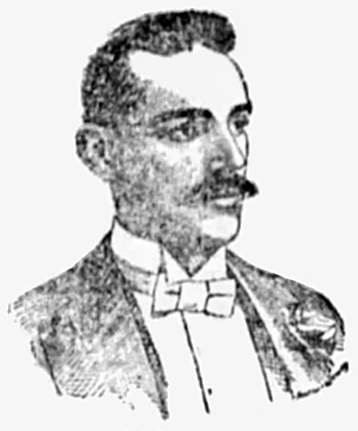
George Stallings, manager and center fielder/first baseman of the Nashville club

As early as October 1894, George Stallings, previously manager of the Nashville Tigers, began acquiring players for a new Nashville ball club. Stallings would serve as its player-manager. He filled the rest of the roster with men he found to be of good character and skilled ball players, some of whom had experience on major league teams. Stallings had played a few games for the Brooklyn Bridegrooms in 1890. He signed Mike Trost of the 1890 St. Louis Browns and Jim Ritz, who had played one game for the Pittsburgh Pirates in 1894. He also acquired the services of his former 1894 Tigers teammates George Cleve and Sam Moran.

With Stallings' players having gathered in the city, the Nashvilles commenced practice at Athletic Park, their home field, on March 18. In further preparation for the coming season, they participated in a number of exhibition games against amateur, collegiate, minor, and major league teams. The first such game was a 17–4 victory over the Vanderbilt Commodores on the campus of Vanderbilt University on March 26. On March 28, they defeated the Nashville Athletic Club's baseball team, 12–2, at Athletic Park. On April 10 and 11, Nashville beat Ted Sullivan's Dallas Steers of the Texas-Southern League, 19–3 and 9–1.

From late March to mid April, the Seraphs served as the spring training competition for several teams from the National League, the only major league at the time, who traveled south to prepare for their seasons in a warmer climate. On March 29 and 30, Nashville was defeated by the Cincinnati Reds, 7–0 and 16–3. The St. Louis Browns handed them two more losses, 14–4 and 7–2, on April 1 and 2. Nashville defeated the Cleveland Spiders, 12–10, on April 3, but lost the next day's game, 18–3. On April 5, pitcher Sam Moran out dueled Cleveland's Cy Young, their 28-year-old ace, in a 4–3 win. Nashville bested the visiting Louisville Colonels, 9–8, on April 13, before traveling to Louisville, where they lost the next afternoon, 22–5. In their final major league warmup, the Seraphs lost to the Pittsburgh Pirates, 19–2, at Athletic Park on April 15.

=== The season ===
==== April to June ====
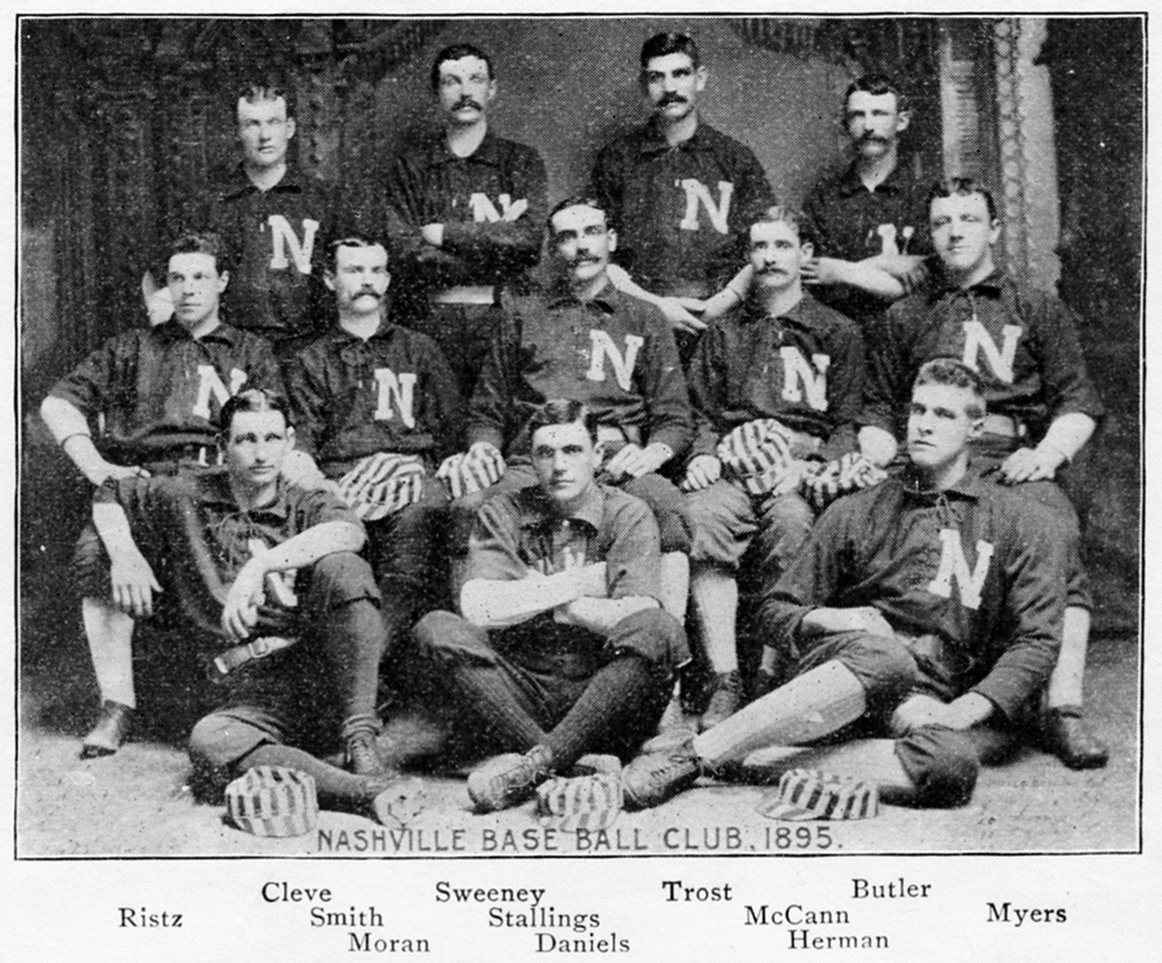
The Seraphs' Opening Day roster

With over a month's practice under their belts and optimistic about the campaign to come, the Nashville Seraphs were set to open the Southern League championship season of 1895 at Evansville on April 25. Nashville's Opening Day roster consisted of pitchers Ed Daniels, Art Herman, and Sam Moran; catchers Daniel Sweeney and Mike Trost; first baseman/manager George Stallings; second baseman Henry Smith; third baseman Bert Myers; shortstop Jim Ritz; left fielder Frank Butler; center fielder Jack McCann; and right fielder George Cleve.

Prior to the season opener, both the Seraphs and their opponents, the Evansville Blackbirds, were paraded in carriages to the ballpark in a procession which included a brass band and a steam calliope. Contested under a light rain, both teams played poorly with only four of the game's 27 runs being earned and committing 12 errors between them, 10 by Nashville. Trost hit two over-the-fence home runs to help the cause of his batterymate Moran, who was hit hard and walked six batters while striking out six. Nashville lost, 17–10. For the benefit of hometown fans, telegraphed descriptions of the game were announced in downtown Nashville at the Merchants' Exchange and the Grand Opera House throughout the season.

The Seraphs fared much better in their second game on April 27, outscoring the Evansvilles, 19–9. Tied 7–7 after two innings, Stallings substituted Herman for Daniels on the mound to start the third. He allowed only two runs over the remaining seven innings as the Nashvilles scored 12 on the way to their first win. From this point forward, Nashville was a fixture at or near the top of the standings and maintained a winning record through the completion of the season. They wrapped up their opening series by taking the third game from Evansville on April 28, 9–2, in which Moran limited hitters to just two runs on four hits, improving over his first start.

The Seraphs returned to Nashville for their Athletic Park home opener on April 29. A large crowd gathered early in the day to welcome the teams which arrived to the park in a parade of open carriages accompanied by a marching band. Before the game, Mayor George Blackmore Guild gave a speech and tossed out the first pitch. The home team bested the visiting Evansvilles, 16–4, just as much on good hitting and fielding as on lackluster pitching by Fred Ossenberg. Only two of Nashville's 16 runs were earned; Ossenberg walked 11 batters and the Blackbirds committed five errors.

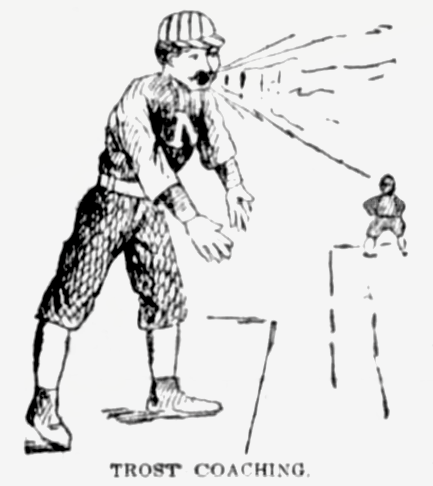
A Nashville Banner cartoon of captain Mike Trost coaching his Seraphs teammates

Catcher Mike Trost, known for emphatically encouraging his teammates, was named team captain in early May. An otherwise disappointing 2–4 road trip, begun on May 10, ended with Nashville sweeping the Chattanooga Warriors in a doubleheader on May 19. They went on to win the next seven games at Athletic Park through May 28 to make it nine consecutive wins—three against the Montgomery Grays and two each against the Little Rock Travelers and New Orleans Pelicans. The Memphis Giants ended the streak on May 30, and the Nashvilles closed out their first full month of competition tied for first place with Evansville at 19–8 (.703).

The Seraphs went five-for-five in an early June road trip, taking three games from Little Rock and two from Memphis, giving them sole possession of first place. Looking to keep his team at the top, Stallings released center fielder McCann on June 8. He had not played since June 2 following sporadic appearances after being hit by a pitch in the arm in late May. Stallings also planned to release shortstop Ritz, whose errors the team blamed for at least five losses. Stallings instead signed Patrick Lynch of the Bloomington, Illinois, Western Interstate League team to play short and moved Ritz to center field when Lynch joined the team on June 19. Ritz was later shifted to second, a position which he played much better, after Henry Smith, who exhibited poor fielding range and committed numerous errors on routine plays, was released after the game of June 29.

Nashville won three games in a single day in an exceedingly rare June 26 tripleheader against Little Rock at Athletic Park. The Tarvelers' manager refused to play the morning game after receiving a telegram from league president J. B. Nicklin informing him that playing more than two games in a day was optional. With only the home team taking the field, Daniels threw three strikes over the plate to Trost, and the umpire awarded Nashville the game on forfeit. Nashville won the afternoon and evening games, 17–7 and 8–5. The forfeited morning game was later removed from the record when the league's directors confirmed Nicklin's ruling that no team could be forced to play more than two games in a day.

By the end of June, approximately halfway through the season, Nashville was locked in a three-way tie for first place with Evansville and Atlanta, and the rest of the league was virtually out of contention.

==== July to September ====
On July 4, Art Herman flirted with a no-hitter against New Orleans in the first game of a doubleheader at Athletic Park before a paid attendance of 1,300 people. He held the visiting batters hitless for eight innings until Billy York singled softly between third and short. The Seraphs won the game, 12–0, and the afternoon's game, 9–4, with 3,200 in attendance. In conjunction with that day's Independence Day celebration, additionally scheduled festivities included a fireworks display, an exhibition of tricks by a "one-legged fancy bicycle rider", and footraces between Seraphs and Pelicans players.

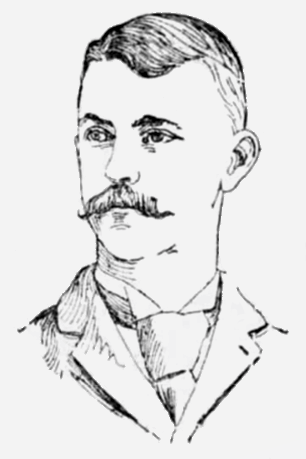
Left fielder Frank Butler was sold to the New York Giants for $1,500 on July 26.

With the team in a heated race for the pennant, a number of changes in late July and early August threatened to knock the Nashvilles out of the championship picture. On July 21 at Mobile, which had transferred from Chattanooga on July 19, Ed Daniels came down with a case of malaria keeping him out of action until August 5. On July 26, Butler was sold to the National League's New York Giants for $1,500. Butler was a skilled fielder and did well at the plate, but his throwing was deemed deficient and he was known for criticizing his teammates. The proceeds of his sale helped ensure the team would break even on the season and would help Stallings acquire more players.

Earlier in the season, Trost had been suspended by Stallings for four days for not adhering to a pledge to abstain from liquor, which had been affecting his play. On July 20, "having accumulated a good supply of booze", Stallings planned to suspended Trost a second time and send him home from their road trip in Mobile, but he disappeared from the team after that afternoon's game on a drinking binge. He was evidently allowed to remain with the team as he showed up to a July 23 game in New Orleans too drunk to play. He did not appear in another game until July 27 wherein Stallings removed him after making two errors, and he managed to get himself ejected by the umpire as he sat on the bench. Trost continued to see playing time as catcher and at first base but did not appear in another game following the afternoon of August 9 when he was removed during the fourth inning.

As the team slipped to third place, several players were added to make up for recent roster subtractions, but more were yet to come. Stallings signed first baseman Al Gibson, who joined the club on July 23, only to be released on August 1. Ritz, who had been struggling at the plate, was released days later on August 4. Stallings also acquired outfielder Lefty Marr, a member of the 1885 and 1886 Nashville Americans, who joined the team on August 6. The Little Rock club, in last place and in financial dire straights, was dissolved on July 27, and its players were dispersed among the remaining teams. Nashville received third baseman Richard Gorman and right fielder Julius Knoll, who played their first games as Nashvilles on August 2. Gorman remained with the Seraphs until being called away to the bedside of his dying mother on August 16.

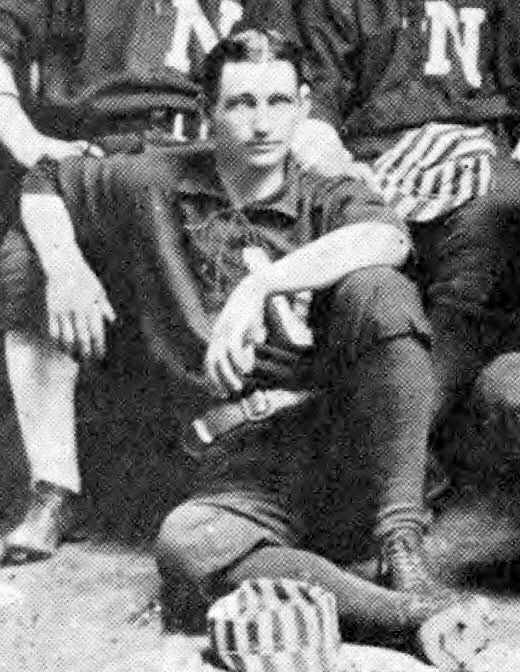
Ace pitcher Sam Moran was sold to the Pittsburgh Pirates for $1,000 on August 24.

The August 10 game versus the Atlanta Crackers at Athletic Park later played a key role in determining the pennant winner. Trailing 10–9 in the final at bat of the ninth inning, Sweeney stepped up to the plate with runners at first and second. With two strikes against him, he hit a high fly ball into foul territory near the grandstand. As Atlanta's catcher, Tug Wilson, attempted to get under the ball, his foot slipped causing him to miss the catch. While reaching for the ball, a boy in the stands threw a baseball glove past his head. The umpire, Clark, ruled this as interference and called Sweeney out, resulting in a 10–9 Atlanta win. The police had to protect Clark from an irate Stallings and an incensed crowd of around 1,000 spectators. The Nashvilles protested the umpire's decision. The incident came to be known as the "glove game".

Continuing to shore up his roster, Stallings acquired shortstop Ed Mrzena to replace the bereaved Gorman on August 17. Nearly a week later, the team lost one-third of its pitching rotation when Stallings came to terms to sell Moran to Connie Mack's Pittsburgh Pirates of the National League. Mack had shown interest in adding Moran to his beleaguered team for weeks as he and Stallings negotiated a price, finally settling on $1,000. Moran struck out seven batters while allowing only four runs on ten hits in his farewell game, a 6–4 win over Mobile in the second game of an August 24 doubleheader. That same day, Stallings acquired the release of National Leaguer Tom McCreery from the Louisville Colonels. Though a pitcher, McCreery joined the team playing right field on August 31 in the place of Cleve after he sprained his left hand in a bicycle accident on August 30.

Meanwhile, Nashville was in the middle of an improbable march up the league standings. Suffering back-to-back losses on August 14 at Atlanta, the Seraphs were in third place, seven games behind the first place Evansvilles. With the season set to close on September 3 and only three weeks left to play, these were the last games Nashville would lose. Starting with an August 15 win at home against Atlanta, the Nashville club won 20 consecutive games. The season-high win streak concluded on September 3 with a 7–0 shutout of Evansville before a crowd of 1,200 fans at Athletic Park. According to the final league standings and President Nicklin, Nashville and Atlanta were tied for first place with identical .670 winning percentages, Nashville at 71–35 and Atlanta at 69–34. Both teams took exception to the idea of a tie and reasoned that each was the rightful champion.

=== The pennant ===
Nashville asserted their right to the pennant for three reasons. First, that Atlanta's last game was scheduled for September 2, therefore a game they played on September 3 against New Orleans was illegal and should not be counted in the standings. Second, they believed the August 10 glove game should be thrown out because of the umpire's improper ruling. Third, they contested a number of games in which New Orleans fielded two illegal players, Ira Davis and Bobby Rothermel, who were competing under assumed identities to circumvent their suspensions from the Pennsylvania State League, thus making them ineligible to play.

Atlanta claimed a mathematical reason for being the pennant winner. They held that while rounding the teams' winning percentages to the traditional three decimal places yielded a tie, if rounded to four places, they would emerge ahead with .6699 (69–34) versus Nashville's .6698 (71–35). The Atlantas also sought to receive credit for games they played which were forfeited by their opponents but not reflected in the standings. They concurred with Nashville's concern over New Orleans using blacklisted players, but they countered that the league's rules provided for awarding such games to the opposing team rather than being nullified.

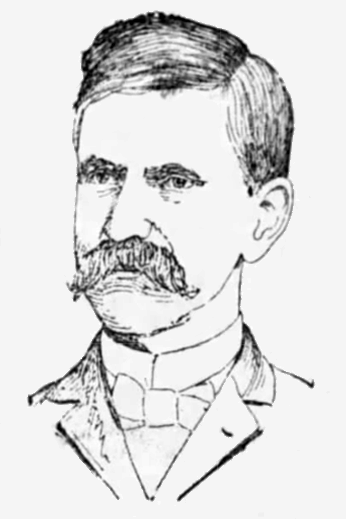
President J. B. Nicklin presided over the meeting at which Nashville was awarded the 1895 pennant.

On September 7 to 8, team representatives met at The Read House in Chattanooga to discuss awarding the pennant. Stallings and White attended on behalf of Nashville. Evansville's representative issued his voting proxy to White. Montgomery's proxy was transferred to Bill Cherry, a resident of Nashville. E. C. Bruffey, sports editor for The Atlanta Constitution, represented Atlanta and New Orleans, the latter by proxy. Mobile was not present. Effectively, this made it Nashville, Evansville, and Montgomery against Atlanta and New Orleans. Rather than contend against three Nashville residents, Bruffey left the meeting. The remaining Nashvillians then voted unanimously to throw out the glove game on the grounds that umpire Clark's decision to award the victory to Atlanta based on fan interference was against the league's constitution. Stallings then withdrew his motion to remove the September 3 Atlanta–New Orleans game and the New Orleans games involving blacklisted players. This moved Nashville up to .676 (71–34), and Atlanta dropped to .667 (68–34). They next resolved that the championship pennant be awarded to Nashville.

President Nicklin, dissatisfied with the meeting's outcome, wrote to each club informing them that the league's constitution required full representation from every team before business could be transacted. With no representatives from Atlanta, Mobile, or New Orleans, the decisions of the Chattanooga meeting were declared unconstitutional and nonbinding. He reinstated the tie record until another meeting could be held. Prior to and immediately after these events, the teams entertained the idea of a playoff series of seven games to determine a champion. On September 9, Atlanta reneged on the proposition and refused to play the series with Nashville.

On December 21, league directors gathered in Birmingham for the league's annual winter meeting. Chief among the agenda was to once-and-for-all award the 1895 pennant. Nashville and Evansville were represented by Stallings and White, while Atlanta, Montgomery, and New Orleans each had their own delegates. Mobile was again absent. After the reading of the previous Chattanooga meeting's minutes, J. B. Allen of Atlanta made a motion to reconsider the expulsion the glove game. Nashville, Evansville, and Montgomery voted 3–2 against Atlanta and New Orleans and the minutes were approved with slight undisclosed alterations. One-hundred nine days after the call of the last out, the Nashville Seraphs were declared champions of the Southern League and would fly their city's first professional baseball pennant.

=== Postseason exhibitions ===
While the fate of the pennant was being decided, the Nashvilles played a series of exhibition games against semi-professional teams in Hopkinsville, Kentucky, and Clarksville, Tennessee, into the second week of September. Sweeney managed the team while Stallings attended the league meeting in Chattanooga, and Marr was named team captain. In addition to Marr, Stallings, and Sweeney, other players remaining with the team at this time were Cleeve, Daniels, Herman, Knoll, Lynch, Mrzena, and Myers. Added to the roster were shortstop Ollie Beard, pitcher Noodles Hahn, catcher Jack Brennan, and an unidentified outfielder Smith. McCreery had returned to Louisville, and the Colonels had also acquired Trost.

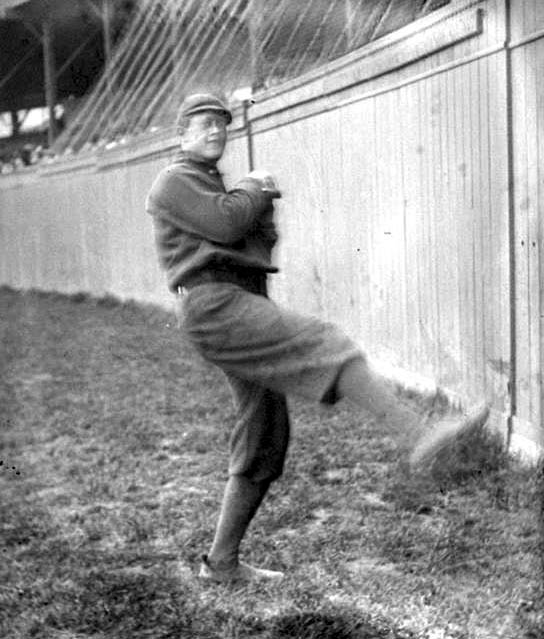
Nashville native Noodles Hahn joined the Seraphs to pitch in exhibition games after the season.

Nashville merchants and the club's directors organized a benefit game for the home team with the full proceeds of ticket sales going directly to the players. The day's festivities included a game between the Seraphs and the Nashville Athletic Club, several 100-yard (91 m) dashes including one for the "slow championship" between Herman, Sweeney, and Mrzena, a boxing match between Knoll and Lynch, Stallings would attempt to break the world's record for rounding the bases, and players would compete in long distance throwing and sliding competitions. About 1,600 tickets were sold at 50 cents apiece to the September 18 benefit, which was won by the Seraphs, 4–2, when the game was called after six innings so the athletic program could be gotten in before dark. Herman finished last in the slow race, the boxing match was a draw, and Stallings won the throwing contest.

From September 24 to 28, the Nashvilles competed against the Richmond Bluebirds, champions of the Class B Virginia League, for "the Championship of the South" at Richmond's West End Park. In game one, the home team easily won, 16–3, after Nashville committed seven errors allowing only four earned runs off of Herman. Game two was called on account of darkness in the bottom of the sixth inning with Nashville leading 10–2, tying the series at a game apiece. Down 7–4 in the seventh inning of game three, the Seraphs touched Bluebirds hurler Jack Knorr for 10 runs on the way to a 14–9 victory. Richmond took game four, 11–4, to even the series. In the seventh inning of that game, Myers, upset with what he believed was an incorrect call at third base, threw the ball hitting the umpire Hoggins in the side just above his kidneys causing him to fall the ground. Several policemen rushed out to arrest Myers shortly before some members of the crowd formed a mob and attacked him on the field. Protected by his arresting officers, Myers was removed from the ballpark and charged with felony assault with intent to kill. The next day, having made bail, Myers visited the ailing umpire, apologized for his conduct, and asked for the case to be dismissed. Myers plead guilty and was fined $10 plus costs, which he immediately paid. He and Hoggins both appeared in that afternoon's decisive game five. Herman held the locals to just four runs on three hits while Myers led Nashville batters with three hits including a home run. The Seraphs won, 13–4, and claimed the Championship of the South.

=== Dissolution ===
Soon after an early October series with the semi-pro Knoxville Reds, Stallings disbanded the team. The Nashville Base Ball Club planned to field a team in the Southern League season of 1896, but refused to participate when the Mobile club rejected putting up their $500 guarantee to finish the season, instead suggesting that each of the other clubs pay a portion of its deposit in addition to their own $500. Nashville's next professional baseball team, the Nashville Centennials, were formed as charter members of the Class C Central League in 1897.

== Season results ==
The Southern League's 1895 standings were amended after the September 3 season's close with the subtraction of the August 10 Nashville–Atlanta glove game. The Chattanooga franchise was transferred to Mobile on June 19. Memphis dropped out of the league on July 23, and Little Rock followed on July 27. Records for these two disbanded clubs are given as they stood on their last days of competition.

1895 Southern League standings
Team	Games	Won	Lost	Win %	Finish	GB
Nashville Seraphs	105	71	34	.676	1st	—
Atlanta Crackers	102	68	34	.667	2nd	1 1/2
Evansville Blackbirds	102	65	37	.637	3rd	4 1/2
New Orleans Pelicans	104	47	57	.452	4th	23 1/2
Chattanooga Warriors/Mobile Bluebirds	106	38	68	.358	5th	33 1/2
Montgomery Grays	108	37	71	.343	6th	35 1/2
Little Rock Travelers	72	25	47	.347	DNF	DNF
Memphis Giants/Lambs	69	32	37	.464	DNF	DNF

== Ballpark ==
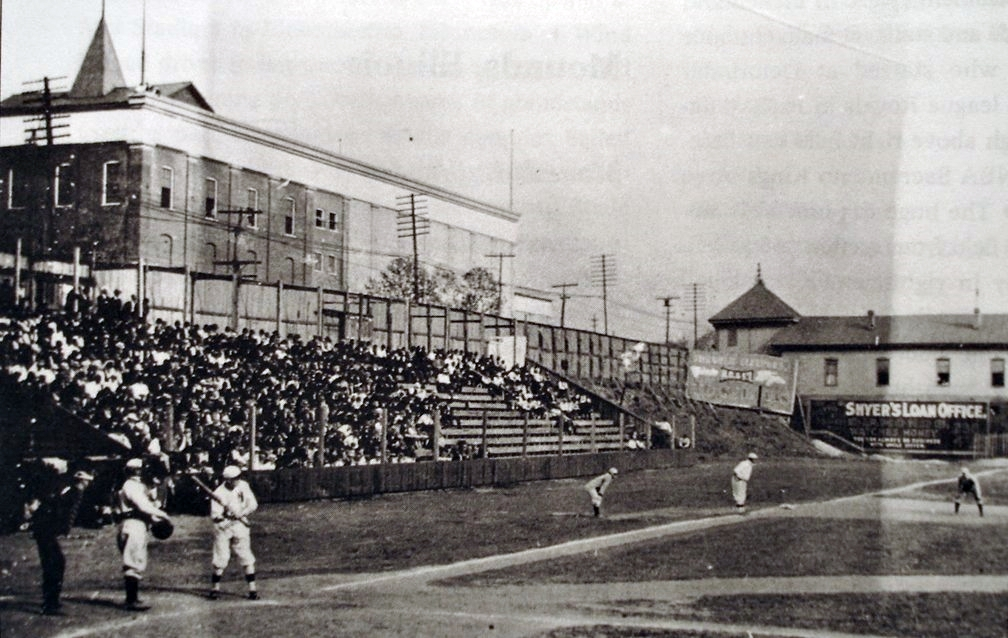
The Fourth Avenue bleachers as they appeared at Athletic Park in 1908

The Seraphs played their home games at Nashville's Athletic Park. The first grandstand was built at the northeastern corner of the block bounded by modern-day Jackson Street, Fourth Avenue North, Harrison Street, and Fifth Avenue North to accommodate fans of the Nashville Americans in 1885. Located in Sulphur Springs Bottom, the land had hitherto been little more than solely a baseball field and required improvements to make it suitable for professional teams. The main Jackson Street entrance led past the ticket booth and into the grandstand's reserved seats behind home plate and a screen backstop. Rooms for players, directors, scorers, and reporters were built under the grandstand. Restrooms and water fountains, which pumped up sulphur water from the springs below, were also built. The distance to the outfield fence was 362 feet (110 m) to left and right fields and 485 feet (148 m) to center.

Extensive renovations were made prior to the 1894 season, including the construction of a new fence and grandstand just west of the original. The existing grandstand was refurbished and given a coat of whitewash, and a screen was placed to block the setting sun. Additionally, the diamond was leveled, and a new scoreboard was installed in right field. The total seating capacity was around 1,000, consisting of about 500 opera chairs, some in private boxes near the front, and bleachers along Fourth Avenue. The facility, known as Sulphur Dell from 1908, was demolished in 1969 after serving as the home of the Nashville Vols from 1901 to 1963. Since 2015, the site has been the location of First Horizon Park, the home stadium of the Triple-A Nashville Sounds baseball team.

== Uniforms ==
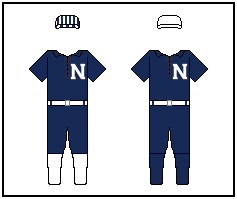
Nashville's uniforms

The only known photograph of the team shows the Nashvilles wearing dark colored jerseys with a light serifed "N" on the left chest. About half of them are wearing long-sleeved shirts, while the rest have shirts cutoff at or just above the elbows. Dark pants terminating below the knees were tucked into either dark or light colored socks and paired with a variety of belts. Their caps were striped.

The March 17 edition of The Nashville American sheds light on the color of their uniforms, describing them as consisting of "navy blue shirts and trousers, white stockings and belts, and white and blue college striped caps. On the breast of the shirt is a large 'N' in white." Also mentioned were matching double-breasted navy coats with white collars and cuffs and large pearl buttons. On June 18, The American makes reference to a change of appearance: "dark stockings and white caps have been adopted instead of the muddy-looking white hose and striped caps they have been wearing."

== Players ==
A total of 19 players competed in at least one game for the Seraphs during the 1895 season. Only six of the 12 men on the April 25 Opening Day roster remained with Nashville for the entire season. Nine also played for major league teams during their careers.

Table key
Position(s)	The player's primary fielding position(s)
MLB	Indicates that a player played in at least one game for a major league team

Positions key
P	Pitcher	SS	Shortstop
C	Catcher	LF	Left fielder
1B	First baseman	CF	Center fielder
2B	Second baseman	RF	Right fielder
3B	Third baseman	—	

Nashville Seraphs roster
Name	Position(s)	Notes	MLB	Ref.
Frank Butler	LF	On Opening Day roster; Sold to New York Giants on July 26	Yes	
George Cleve	RF	On Opening Day roster; Played entire season	No	
Ed Daniels	P	On Opening Day roster; Played entire season	No	
Al Gibson	1B/RF	Joined on July 23; Released on August 1	No	
Richard Gorman	3B	Joined from Little Rock Travelers on August 2; Left team on August 16 (bereavement of mother)	No	
Art Herman	P	On Opening Day roster; Played entire season	Yes	
Julius Knoll	CF	Joined from Little Rock Travelers on August 2; Played remainder of season	No	
Patrick Lynch	SS/2B	Joined from Bloomington Western Interstate League club on June 19; Played remainder of season	No	
Lefty Marr	1B	Joined on August 6; Played remainder of season	Yes	
Jack McCann	CF	On Opening Day roster; Released on June 8	No	
Tom McCreery	RF	Joined from Louisville Colonels on August 31; Played remainder of season	Yes	
Ed Mrzena	SS	Joined on August 17; Played remainder of season	No	
Sam Moran	P	On Opening Day roster; Sold to Pittsburgh Pirates on August 24	Yes	
Bert Myers	3B	On Opening Day roster; Played entire season	Yes	
Jim Ritz	SS/2B	On Opening Day roster; Released on August 4	Yes	
Henry Smith	2B	On Opening Day roster; Released on June 29	No	
George Stallings	CF/1B	On Opening Day roster; Played entire season	Yes	
Dan Sweeney	1B/C	On Opening Day roster; Played entire season	No	
Mike Trost	C	On Opening Day roster; Last played on August 9	Yes	
