= Washington Giants =

- 1896; Washington, Indiana

Minor league affiliations
- Class: Independent (1896)
- League: Kentucky-Indiana League (1896)

Major league affiliations
- Team: None

Minor league titles
- League titles (0): None

Team data
- Name: Washington Giants (1896); Washington Browns (1897)
- Ballpark: Unknown (1896)

The Washington Giants were a minor league baseball team based in Washington, Indiana. In 1896, the Giants played the season as members of the Independent level Kentucky-Indiana League, finishing in fourth place. The Giants preceded the 1897 Washington Browns.

== History ==
Minor league baseball began in Washington, Indiana in 1896, when the Washington "Giants" became members of the Independent level Kentucky-Indiana League as the league reformed during the 1896 season. The league began play as a four–team league on June 22, 1896, with franchises in Evansville, Indiana, Henderson, Kentucky, Owensboro, Kentucky and Vincennes, Indiana. When the Vincennes franchise folded, the league reformed during the season. Starting July 1, 1896, Washington joined the teams from Hopkinsville, Kentucky and Madisonville, Kentucky in the reorganized six–team league.

After Madisonville, Henderson and Hopkinsville folded between July 29 and August 4, the Kentucky–Indiana League permanently folded on August 5, 1896. The Washington Giants placed 4th in the Kentucky–Indiana League standings in 1896. Washington finished 3.0 games behind first place Madisonville (15–9), the Owensboro Corncrackers (14–9) and Hopkinsville (12–12). The Giants were ahead of the Evansville Hoosiers (9–14) and Henderson (9–15) in the Kentucky–Indiana League final standings.

Washington continued play when the 1897 Washington Browns played a partial season as charter members of the Central League.

== The ballpark ==
The exact name and location of the Washington Giants' home minor league ballpark in 1896 is not referenced.

== Year–by–year records ==
| Year | Record | Finish | Manager | Playoffs/Notes |
|---|---|---|---|---|
| 1896 | 11–11 | 4th | NA | League folded August 5 |

== Notable alumni ==
- Charlie Knepper (1917)
- Washington Giants players
