= Nashville Centennials =

Former Minor League Baseball team in Nashville, Tennessee

- 1897; Nashville, Tennessee

Minor league affiliations
- Class: Class C
- League: Central League

Minor league titles
- Pennants (0): None

Team data
- Name: Nashville Centennials
- Colors: Red, white, blue
- Ballpark: Athletic Park
- Manager: Billy Work

The Nashville Centennials were a Minor League Baseball team that played in the Class C Central League in 1897. They were located in Nashville, Tennessee, and were named in reference to the celebration of the one-hundredth anniversary of Tennessee's admission to the union in 1796, highlighted by the 1897 Tennessee Centennial and International Exposition. The Centennials played their home games at Athletic Park, later known as Sulphur Dell.

Financial problems brought on by poor weather, low attendance, and a lack of local monetary support necessitated the team's transfer to Henderson, Kentucky, after June 3. At the time of their departure, Nashville was in second place with an 18–14 record, one game out of first. The league ultimately disbanded on July 20. Combined, the Nashville/Henderson team finished in second place at 39–31, one-and-a-half games out of first.

== History ==
=== Formation ===
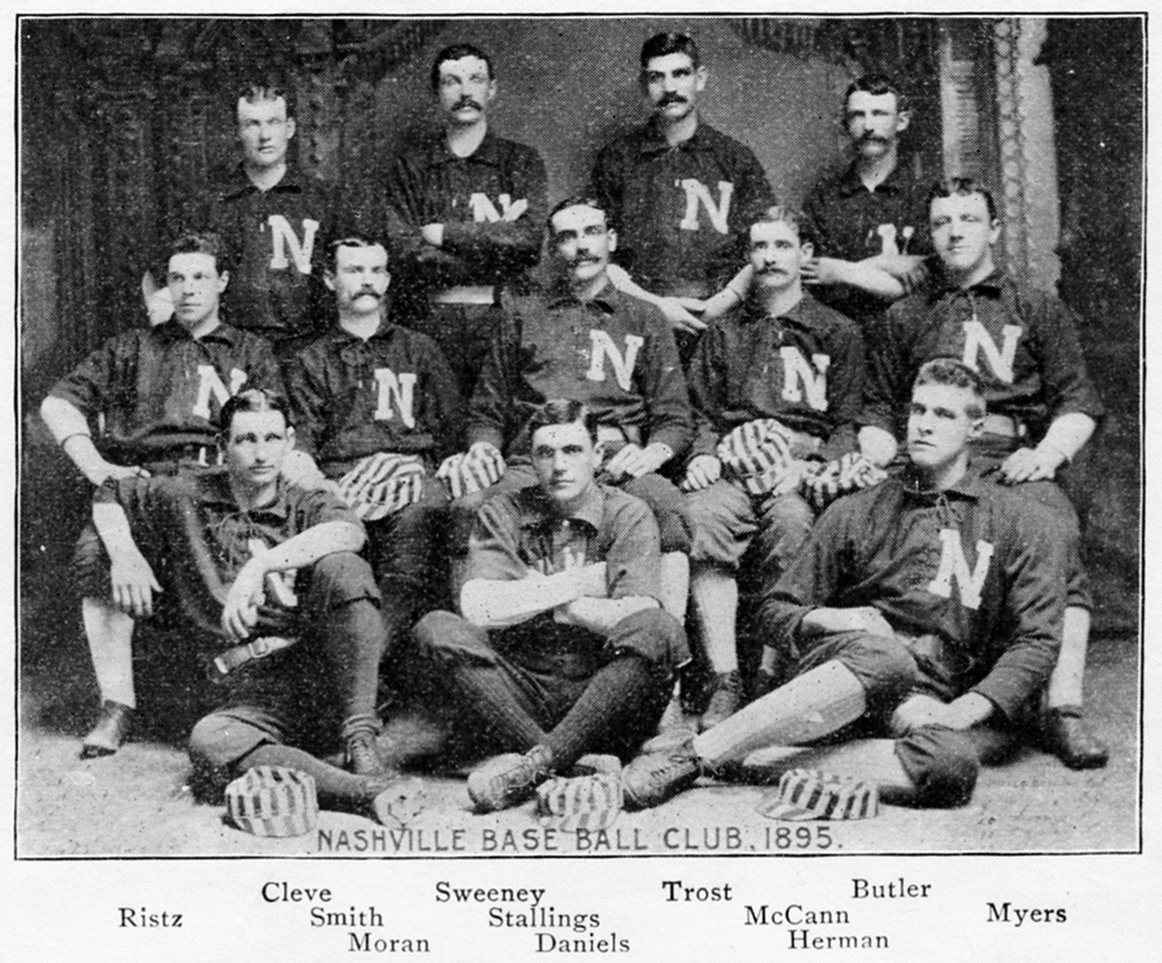
The Nashville Seraphs represented Nashville in the Southern League in 1895.

Professional baseball was first played in Nashville, Tennessee, by the Nashville Americans, who were charter members of the original Southern League from 1885 to 1886 and played their home games at Sulphur Spring Park, later renamed Athletic Park and Sulphur Dell. This ballpark was to be the home of Nashville's minor league teams through 1963. In 1887, Nashville's Southern League team was called the Nashville Blues. The Nashville Tigers competed in the same league from 1893 to 1894. The Nashville Seraphs won the city's first professional championship in the Southern League in 1895. Nashville planned to field another team in the Southern League's 1896 season, but refused to participate when one club rejected putting up its US$500 guarantee to finish the season, instead suggesting that each of the other clubs pay a portion of its deposit in addition to their own $500. The Southern League hoped Nashville would rejoin for 1897, a desire which was not shared by local baseball supporters, while it was also suggested that Nashville could gain admittance to the Western League, a predecessor to the American League.

Meanwhile, George Stallings and W. L. "Billy" Work were drawing up plans for the Central League, which was conceptualized in spring 1895 when Southern baseball figures were deciding how to organize for that season. Stallings and Work had been teammates on the 1894 Nashville Tigers; Stallings was player-manager of that team and of the Seraphs. Whereas the Southern League was spread out across the South resulting in costly travel expenses, the Central League would be a much more compact circuit. The pair thought that either this arrangement or a state league consisting of all or mostly teams in Tennessee would be the best fit for a Nashville club.

With teams from several states eagerly seeking to join the proposed Central League, representatives met to organize in Evansville on January 20, 1897. While the exact league lineup was not finalized at the meeting, it was resolved that the circuit was to consist of six teams who would pay a $500 deposit to guarantee they would play the entire season, and player salaries were capped at $900 per team. Officials met again on February 7 in Evansville to solidify the league's membership, and franchises were granted to clubs in Cairo, Illinois; Evansville, Terre Haute, and Washington, Indiana; Paducah, Kentucky; and Nashville.

Nashville's team has come to be known as the Centennials. Though there are no contemporary references to this moniker, local newspapers commonly called the team the "Centennial lads" and the "Centennial City lads." The name was in reference to the celebration of the one-hundredth anniversary of the Tennessee's admission to the union in 1796. The centerpiece of which was the Tennessee Centennial and International Exposition held in Centennial Park from May 1 to October 30, 1897.

=== Spring training ===
By February 10, Billy Work, who was to manage the Nashville club, had already begun acquiring players. Two pitchers signed to start the season had previous major league experience. Charlie Petty, a Nashville native, played for the Cincinnati Red Stockings (1889), New York Giants (1893), Washington Senators (1894), and Cleveland Spiders (1894). Theodore Conover had also pitched one game for the 1889 Red Stockings. Two other players would have been familiar faces to Nashville baseball fans at the time: shortstop Patrick Lynch of the Nashville Seraphs and outfielder George Cleve also of the Seraphs and the 1894 Tigers.

Manager Work originally planned to have his players report to Nashville around March 27 so as to have plenty of time to prepare for the April 28 season opener. He had players signed but, unfortunately, nowhere to practice. Athletic Park, where the team was to play, was located in a low-lying area in close proximity to the Cumberland River and prone to regular flooding in the spring. Heavy March rains left the ballpark flooded and unable to accommodate any baseball activities. Having to push back their report date, Work wrote to his players asking them to practice at home until Athletic Park was ready.

With their ballpark still under feet of water, all spring training exhibition games with out-of-town teams had to be cancelled, including a series each against the National League's Cincinnati Reds, the Western League's Detroit Tigers, and the minor league Atlanta Crackers and Chattanooga Blues. By mid-April, when the flood waters finally receded, Work ordered players to arrive at Nashville no later than April 19. The postponed start to their spring practice put them some two weeks behind the rest of the league, whose teams were already at work on the diamond. By April 24, half of the roster had yet to report even though they had been sent train tickets and telegraphed in response their intentions to arrive by earlier dates. The team was so shorthanded that three local amateur players had to be recruited to make up a team for a practice game on April 26. In what was to be their only tuneup game before the season commenced, the Centennials defeated the Vanderbilt Commodores, 7–4, on April 26.

=== The season in Nashville ===
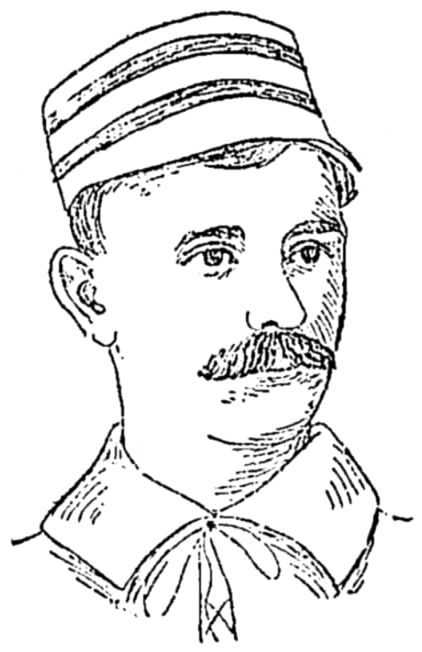
Shortstop Percy Griffin

Despite the lack of virtually any practice, the Centennial lads were scheduled to open the 1897 season on April 28 against the Evansville Brewers at Athletic Park. Nashville's Opening Day roster consisted of pitchers Theodore Conover, Jack McCoy, Charlie Petty, and Willis; catcher Frank Belt; first baseman Pat Dillard; second basemen Charley Watkins and Patrick Lynch; third baseman Fred Blakely; shortstop Percy Griffin; left/right fielders Fred Brott and George Cleve; and center fielder Phil Veatch. Billy Work would manage from the dugout or play the field as needed. Watkins, a local player, was added only for the first game until Lynch could join the team.

The Opening Day game was a pitchers' duel between Nashville's Willis and Evansville's King Bailey witnessed by about 500 people in attendance. The visitors scored their first run on an error in the first inning and followed up with another run in the second. In the fifth, Willis drove in Watkins with an RBI double and later scored on Blakey's base hit, tying the game. Evansville scored again in the seventh, defeating the home team, 5–4. Work said afterwards that he expected much better from his team as they got in more playing time, this having been the first time many of them had played together. Nashville lost the next afternoon's game, 2–1, after it was called in the sixth on account of a downpour which had started as a drizzle in the second. The Centennials got their first win on April 30 behind the pitching of Petty, who allowed just one run on four hits and went three-for-three at the plate.

The team left for a three-game road trip at Evansville after the opening series so as not to coincide with the opening of the Centennial Exposition on May 1. They returned on May 5 and fared much better in their second home series, as they took all three games from the visiting Cairo Egyptians. They would spend the next two weeks on the road.

It was during this long road trip that financial problems and the question as to how long the team would remain in Nashville began to surface. Costly repairs to fix flood damage at Athletic Park and the cancellation of their preseason exhibition games were the first financial strains on the club. Cold and rainy weather resulted in poor attendance and low profits from ticket sales. With less money coming in and the normal expenditures of running a ball club, the team was "a few hundred dollars" in debt. On May 11, league president George Simons wrote to the sports editor of The Nashville American that he hoped Nashville to remain in the league, but that there were several prospective cities waiting to accept the team if their money troubles went unresolved. Simons went on to ask the editor to share the letter with local baseball supporters in hopes that they would put together an organization to back the team.

The Centennials played well on the road, returning to Nashville on May 24 in second place holding on to a 13–10 (.565) record. They played an exhibition game that day against an amateur team in Princeton, Kentucky, winning, 10–3. While on the trip, Theodore Conover, who was on the Opening Day roster, made his first appearance of the season in a May 19 loss at Evansville. Willis left the team on May 20. Also, Lynch was disqualified from playing after the Texas League claimed to hold him in reserve. A second baseman by the name of Kyle was signed to take his place until the matter could be resolved. Kyle joined the team on May 21, and Lynch was later cleared to return to Nashville on June 1. In need of extra pitching, Work signed Will Geralds, a local semi-pro, on May 26.

The next home stand would help decide whether the team would remain in Nashville or be forced to look for better patronage elsewhere. With the weather and the team's play improving, home attendance began to increase. President Simons arrived in Nashville on June 1 to assist Work with organizing a stock company to support the team. They succeeded in finding gentlemen willing to support the team, but were not able to work up the necessary amount to keep the team in the Centennial City.

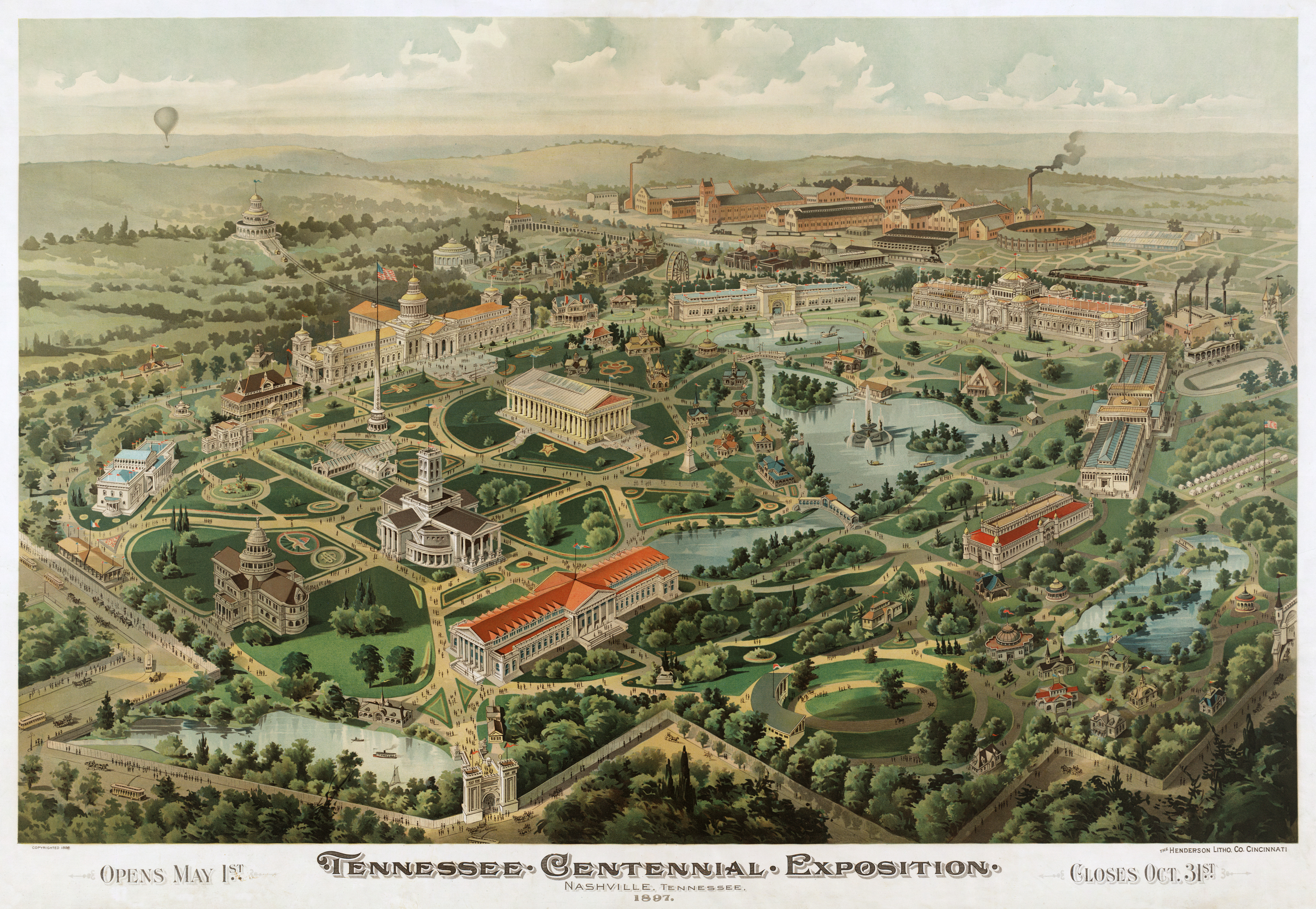
The Tennessee Centennial Exposition is one of many attractions that may have drawn business away from the team.

Nashville played its final game at Athletic Park on June 3 against the Terre Haute Hottentots. The Centennial lads seemed to put forth very little effort, scoring only two runs on four hits while the Hottentots put up 15 runs on just as many hits. The game was called in the eighth inning to the relief of players and fans alike. The team left town in second place with an 18–14 (.563) record, one game out of first. It was, at first, expected that the exposition, which drew in nearly two million visitors, would also attract patrons to the ballpark. In the end, it was supposed that the many other attractions offered by their namesake Centennial City in conjunction with the year's celebration drew too much attention away from what had become a promising team.

=== Relocation ===
President Simmons announced the league's intention to transfer the club to Decatur, Illinois. The league took possession of the team from Work and placed it in the hands of catcher Frank Belt. He would lead the team until it could be permanently established in its new city. Only George Cleve elected to leave the team with the rest staying together. The city of Nashville was left without a professional baseball team until the Nashville Baseball Club, better known as the Nashville Vols, was formed as a charter member of the Southern Association in 1901.

After an off day on June 4, the team played a series each in Cairo and Paducah, where they were still referred to as Nashville. Meanwhile, Simons was still trying to place the former Nashville franchise in a new city. Decatur, the intended spot, refused to accept the team and its over $400 debt in unpaid player salaries and forthwith demolished their ballpark. Simons next turned to Springfield, Illinois; Owensboro, Kentucky; and Henderson, Kentucky. The league gave Nashville a five-day window to get together the funds to guarantee finishing the season, but it failed to do so. Instead, the citizens of Henderson gathered enough money to have the team transferred there.

On the morning of July 20, the Washington Browns disbanded amid poor attendance and severe debt. The Evansville and Terre Haute teams dropped out of the league later that day. The Central League was finished. At the cessation of play, the Henderson team was in second place with a record of 39–31 (.557), one-and-a-half games behind Evansville.

== Season results ==
1897 Central League standings (June 3)
Team	Games	Won	Lost	Win %	Finish	GB
Evansville Brewers	32	19	13	.594	1st	—
Nashville Centennials	32	18	14	.563	2nd	1
Washington Browns	28	15	13	.536	3rd	2
Terre Haute Hottentots	27	12	15	.444	4th	4 1/2
Paducah Little Colonels	28	12	16	.429	5th	5
Cairo Egyptians	29	12	17	.414	6th	5 1/2

1897 Central League final standings (July 20)
Team	Games	Won	Lost	Win %	Finish	GB
Evansville Brewers	71	41	30	.577	1st	—
Nashville Centennials/Henderson	70	39	31	.557	2nd	1 1/2
Washington Browns	65	33	32	.508	3rd	5
Terre Haute Hottentots	67	31	36	.463	4th	8
Paducah Little Colonels	68	31	37	.456	5th	8 1/2
Cairo Egyptians	69	30	39	.435	6th	10

== Ballpark ==
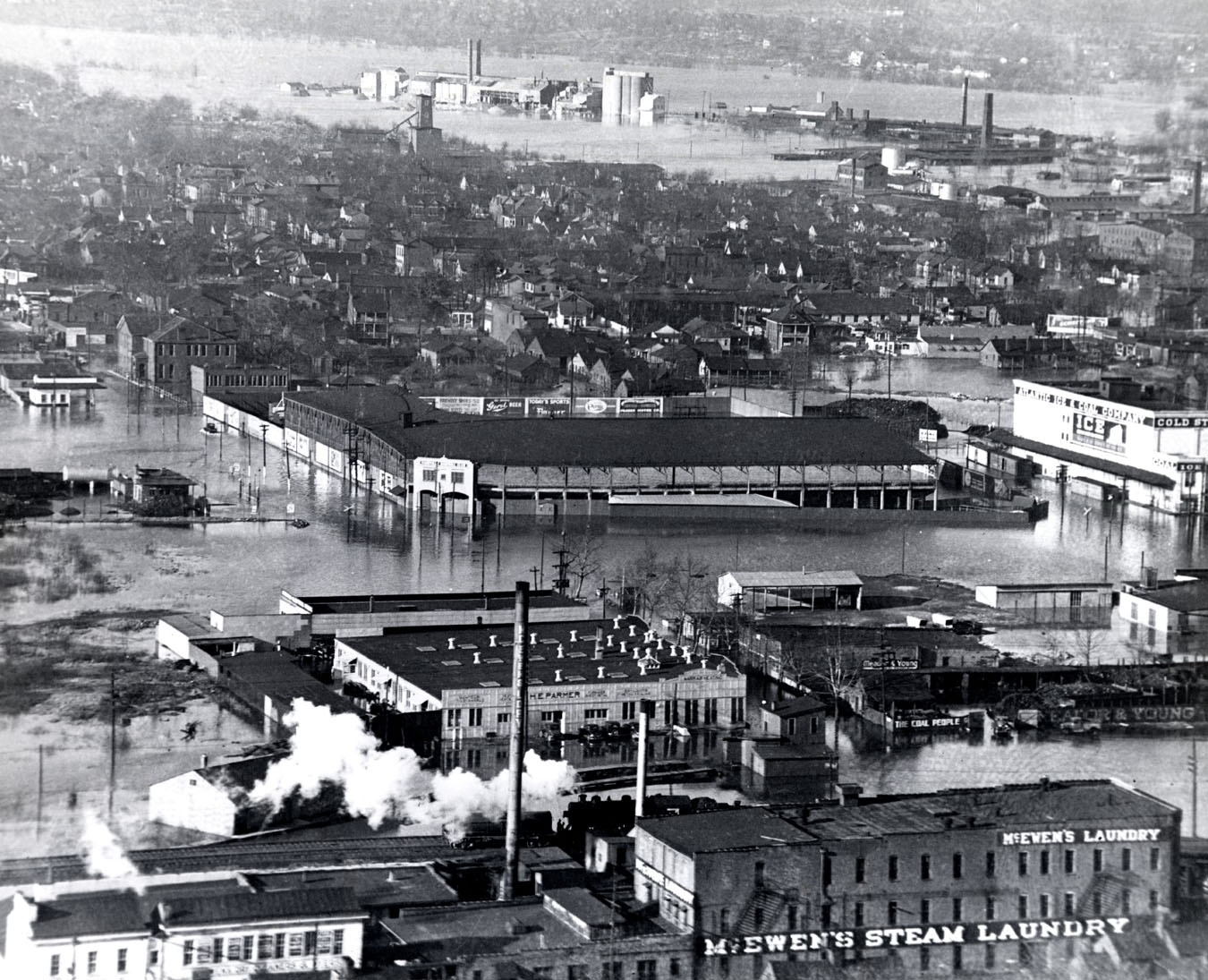
The ballpark, shown here in 1937 after numerous renovations, was prone to flooding from the Cumberland River.

The Centennials played their home games at Nashville's Athletic Park. The first grandstand was built at the northeastern corner of the block bounded by modern-day Jackson Street, Fourth Avenue North, Harrison Street, and Fifth Avenue North to accommodate fans of the Nashville Americans in 1885. The distance to the outfield fence was 362 feet (110 m) to left and right fields and 485 feet (148 m) to center. Extensive renovations were made prior to the 1894 season, including the construction of a new grandstand and fence. The new wooden grandstand was located just west of the original, which was also refurbished. The total seating capacity was around 1,000, consisting of about 500 opera chairs, some in private boxes near the front, and bleachers along Fourth Avenue.

By early 1897, the ballpark had fallen into dilapidation. Work was desirous of building a new ballpark for the team, but eventually settled on making repairs to Athletic Park, the less costly choice. The old bleachers were replaced with seats, additional seating was added, and the fences were repaired. The facility, known as Sulphur Dell from 1908, was demolished in 1969 after serving as the home of the Nashville Vols from 1901 to 1963. Since 2015, the site has been the location of First Horizon Park, the home ballpark of the Triple-A Nashville Sounds baseball team.

== Uniforms ==
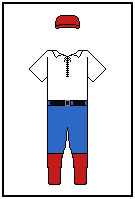
The team's uniform

No photographs of the team are known to exist. At a meeting of the league's directors on February 7, 1897, the uniform colors for each team were decided upon. Nashville's were to be "blue with maroon trimmings." It was later suggested that being the Centennial year, uniforms should consist of America's national colors. Accordingly, manager Work ordered uniforms from A. G. Spalding & Brothers described thusly in the March 12 edition of The Nashville American: "the pants made of blue, the shirts white, with red letters across the breast, and the caps red. The stockings will be either blue or red, which of these colors, however, has not been decided upon." There are no further accounts of which stockings were selected or any details on the specifics of the lettering. With no contemporary references to the team as the "Centennials," and clubs of this period regularly displaying their city's name on their jerseys, the lettering may have spelled "NASHVILLE."

== Players ==
Seventeen players competed in at least one game for the Centennials. Three also played for major league teams during their careers.

Table key
Position	The player's primary fielding position
MLB	Indicates that a player played in at least one game for a major league team

Pat Dillard played for the St. Louis Cardinals in 1900.

Nashville/Henderson Centennials roster
Name	Position	Notes	MLB	Ref.
Frank Belt	catcher	On Opening Day roster	No	
Fred Blakely	third baseman	On Opening Day roster	No	
Fred Brott	center fielder	On Opening Day roster; left after relocation	No	
George Cleve	right fielder	On Opening Day roster; left after relocation	No	
Theodore Conover	pitcher	On Opening Day roster	Yes	
Pat Dillard	first baseman	On Opening Day roster; left after relocation	Yes	
Will Geralds	pitcher	Acquired on May 26	No	
Percy Griffin	shortstop	On Opening Day roster	No	
Kyle	utility	Acquired on May 21	No	
Patrick Lynch	second baseman	On Opening Day roster	No	
Jack McCoy	outfielder	On Opening Day roster	No	
Charlie Petty	pitcher	On Opening Day roster	Yes	
Phil Veatch	center fielder	On Opening Day roster	No	
Charley Watkins	second baseman	On Opening Day roster; played one game	No	
Wiecke	—	—	No	
Willis	pitcher	On Opening Day roster; left team on May 20	No	
Billy Work	first baseman	On Opening Day roster; left after relocation	No	
