= Samuel Moran =

Samuel Moran may refer to:

- Sam Moran (born 1978), Australian entertainer
- Sam Moran (baseball), American baseball player (1870–1897)
