= Jim Ritz =

American baseball player (1874–1896)

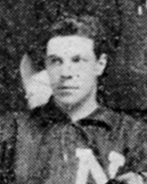
- Third Baseman
- Born: 1874; Pittsburgh, Pennsylvania, U.S.
- Died: November 10, 1896 (aged 21–22); Pittsburgh, Pennsylvania, U.S.
- Batted: Unknown Threw: Unknown

MLB debut
- July 20, 1894, for the Pittsburgh Pirates

Last MLB appearance
- July 20, 1894, for the Pittsburgh Pirates

MLB statistics
- Batting average: .000
- Runs: 1
- Runs batted in: 0
- Stats at Baseball Reference

Teams
- Pittsburgh Pirates (1894)

James L. Ritz (1874 – November 10, 1896) was an American third baseman in Major League Baseball. He played in one game for the Pittsburgh Pirates of the National League on July 20, 1894. After his brief stint with the Pirates, he played for the Toledo White Stockings of the Western League in 1894, the Nashville Seraphs of the Southern Association in 1895 and the Washington Little Senators of the Interstate League in 1896.

== See also ==
- List of baseball players who died during their careers

== Sources ==
- Career statistics from Baseball Reference · Baseball Reference (Minors) · Retrosheet · Baseball Almanac
