= Kentucky–Indiana League =

Kentucky-Indiana League
- Classification: Independent (1896)
- Sport: Minor League Baseball
- First season: 1896
- Folded: August 5, 1896
- President: Ad Stallman (1896)
- No. of teams: 7
- Country: United States
- Most titles: 1 Madisonville (1896)
- Related competitions: Kentucky-Indiana-Tennessee League

The Kentucky–Indiana League was a minor league baseball league which operated in Kentucky and Indiana in 1896. The league had six teams in their lone season. Former Major League Baseball players who participated in the league were Frank Freund, Sammy Strang, Bob Langsford and Charlie Knepper.

== 1896 teams ==
- Evansville, Indiana: Evansville Hoosiers
- Henderson, Kentucky: Henderson
- Hopkinsville, Kentucky: Hopkinsville
- Madisonville, Kentucky: Madisonville
- Owensboro, Kentucky: Owensboro Corncrackers
- Vincennes, Indiana: Vincennes
- Washington, Indiana: Washington Giants

== 1896 Kentucky-Indiana League standings ==
Team standings	W	L	PCT	GB	Managers
Madisonville	15	9	.625	-	Jacob Aydelotte
Owensboro Corncrackers	14	9	.609	0.5	Sheridan
Hopkinsville	12	12	.500	3.0	Hugh Galbraith
Washington Giants	11	11	.500	3.0	NA
Evansville Hoosiers	9	14	.391	5.5	Ad Stallman
Henderson	9	15	.375	6.0	Phil Reccius / Coleman

The league started June 22 with Evansville, Henderson, Owensboro and Vincennes. When the Vincennes franchise folded, the Hopkinsville, Madisonville and Washington teams were added and the league restarted July 1.
Madisonville disbanded July 29; Henderson disbanded August 3; Evansville disbanded August 4
