= Bert Myers =

American baseball player (1874–1915)

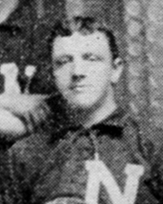
- Third baseman
- Born: April 8, 1874; Frederick, Maryland, U.S.
- Died: October 12, 1915 (aged 41); Washington, D.C., U.S.
- Batted: Right Threw: Right

MLB debut
- April 25, 1896, for the St. Louis Browns

Last MLB appearance
- April 27, 1900, for the Philadelphia Phillies

MLB statistics
- Batting average: .253
- Home runs: 0
- Runs batted in: 52
- Stats at Baseball Reference

Teams
- St. Louis Browns 1896; Washington Senators 1898; Philadelphia Phillies 1900

James Albert Myers (April 8, 1874 – October 12, 1915) was an American professional baseball player who played in parts of three seasons for the St. Louis Browns, Washington Senators and Philadelphia Phillies. He was born in Frederick, Maryland, and died in Washington, D.C., at the age of 41.
