= Terre Haute Hottentots =

- 1897; Terre Haute, Indiana

Minor league affiliations
- Previous classes: Class C
- Previous leagues: Central League

Major league affiliations
- Previous teams: Unaffiliated

Team data
- Name: Terre Haute Hottentots
- Colors: Gray & blue

The Terre Haute Hottentots were a Minor League Baseball team from Terre Haute, Indiana, that played in the Northwestern League in 1891, Illinois–Iowa League in 1892, Western Interstate League in 1895, Western League in 1895, Class C Central League in 1897, 1900, and 1903 to 1909, and the Illinois–Indiana–Iowa League from 1901 to 1902.

== Team history ==
On February 7, 1897, the Terre Haute Hottentots were formed as a charter member of the Class C Central League. Joining the Hottentots in the six-team league were the Cairo Egyptians, Evansville Brewers, Nashville Centennials, Paducah Little Colonels, and Washington Browns. Terre Haute's uniforms were gray and blue.

Severe financial problems throughout the circuit forced the league to disband on July 20, 1897. As of July 19, the final day of play, the Hottentots were in fourth place with a 31–36 (.463) record.
