= Art Herman =

American baseball player (1871–1955)

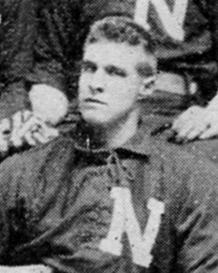
- Pitcher
- Born: May 11, 1871; Louisville, Kentucky, U.S.
- Died: September 20, 1955 (aged 84); Los Angeles, California, U.S.
- Batted: Unknown Threw: Unknown

MLB debut
- June 29, 1896, for the Louisville Colonels

Last MLB appearance
- May 20, 1897, for the Louisville Colonels

MLB statistics
- Win–loss record: 4–7
- Earned run average: 5.37
- Strikeouts: 17
- Stats at Baseball Reference

Teams
- Louisville Colonels (1896–1897)

Arthur Herman (May 11, 1871 – September 20, 1955) was an American Major League Baseball pitcher. He played for the Louisville Colonels of the National League in 1896 and 1897. He played in the minor leagues through 1906.
