= Frank Butler (outfielder) =

American baseball player (1860–1945)

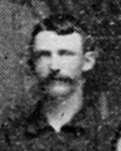
- Outfielder
- Born: July 18, 1866; Savannah, Georgia, U.S.
- Died: July 10, 1945 (aged 78); Jacksonville, Florida, U.S.
- Batted: Left Threw: Left

MLB debut
- July 30, 1895, for the New York Giants

Last MLB appearance
- August 3, 1895, for the New York Giants

MLB statistics
- Batting average: .273
- Home runs: 0
- Runs batted in: 2
- Stats at Baseball Reference

Teams
- New York Giants (1895)

Frank Dean Butler (July 18, 1866 – July 10, 1945) was an American professional baseball player who played outfield in the Major Leagues.
