= Paducah Little Colonels =

- 1897; Paducah, Kentucky

Minor league affiliations
- Previous classes: Class C
- Previous leagues: Central League

Major league affiliations
- Previous teams: Unaffiliated

Team data
- Name: Paducah Little Colonels
- Colors: Old gold & maroon

The Paducah Little Colonels were a minor league baseball team from Paducah, Kentucky, that played in the Class C Central League in 1897.

== Team history ==
On February 7, 1897, the Paducah Little Colonels were formed as a charter member of the Class C level Central League. Joining the Little Colonels in the six-team league were the Cairo Egyptians, Evansville Brewers, Nashville Centennials, Terre Haute Hottentots, and Washington Browns. Paducah's uniforms were old gold and maroon.

Severe financial problems throughout the circuit forced the league to disband on July 20. As of July 19, the final day of play, the Little Colonels were in fifth place with a 31–37 (.456) record.
