= Sam Moran (baseball) =

American baseball player (1870–1897)

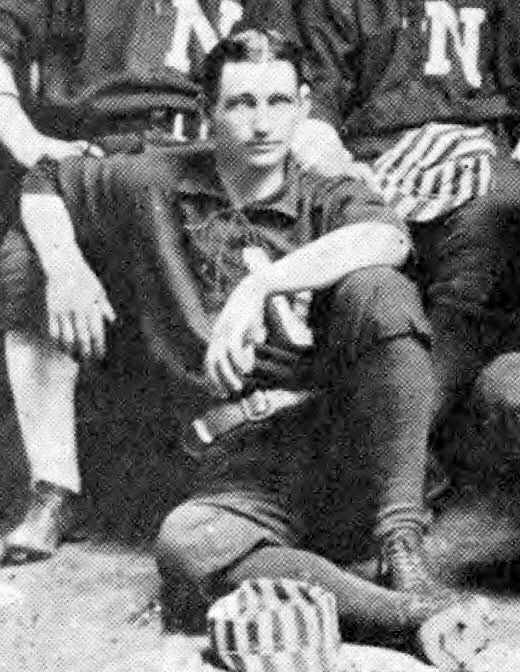
- Moran with the Nashville Seraphs in 1895
- Pitcher
- Born: September 16, 1870; Rochester, New York, U.S.
- Died: August 27, 1897 (aged 26); Rochester, New York, U.S.
- Batted: Unknown Threw: Left

MLB debut
- August 28, 1895, for the Pittsburgh Pirates

Last MLB appearance
- September 28, 1895, for the Pittsburgh Pirates

MLB statistics
- Win–loss record: 2–4
- Earned run average: 7.47
- Strikeouts: 19
- Stats at Baseball Reference

Teams
- Pittsburgh Pirates (1895)

Samuel Moran (September 16, 1870 – August 27, 1897) was an American professional baseball player. He was a pitcher for the Pittsburgh Pirates of the National League in August and September 1895.

Moran was playing for the Southern League's Nashville Seraphs when his contract was purchased by the Pirates on August 18, 1895. Earlier that season, he pitched in an exhibition against the National League's Cleveland Spiders. Moran earned the win for Nashville, out-dueling Cleveland's 28-year-old ace, Cy Young.
