= Cairo Egyptians =

- 1897–1948; (1897, 1903–1906, 1911–1914, 1922–1924, 1946–1948); Cairo, Illinois

Minor league affiliations
- Previous classes: Class D (1903–1906, 1911–1914, 1922–1924, 1946–1948); Class C (1897)
- Previous leagues: Kentucky–Illinois–Tennessee League (1903–1906, 1911–1914, 1922–1924, 1946–1950); Central League (1897)

Major league affiliations
- Previous teams: None

Minor league titles
- League titles: 1903, 1914

Team data
- Name: Cairo Egyptians (1911–1914, 1922–1924, 1946–1948); Cairo Giants (1905–1906); Cairo Champions (1904); Cairo Egyptians (1897, 1903)
- Colors: Gray & black (1897)

The Cairo Egyptians were a minor league baseball team from Cairo, Illinois, that played in the Kentucky–Illinois–Tennessee League (KITTY League) on and off from 1903 to 1948 and in the Central League in 1897.

== Team history ==
On February 7, 1897, the Cairo Egyptians, based in Cairo, Illinois, were formed as a charter member of the Class C Central League. Joining the Egyptions in the six-team league were the Evansville Brewers, Nashville Centennials, Paducah Little Colonels, Terre Haute Hottentots, and Washington Browns. Cairo's uniforms were gray and black. Severe financial problems throughout the circuit forced the league to disband on July 20. As of July 19, the final day of play, the Egyptians were in sixth place with a 30–39 (.435) record.

Another Egyptians team played in the first Kentucky–Illinois–Tennessee League (KITTY League) from 1903 to 1906 as the Egyptians (1903), Champions (1904), and Giants (1905–1906). It resurfaced as the Egyptians from 1911 to 1914 in the second KITTY League, then returned from 1922 to 1924 in another incarnation of the league.

For the final KITTY league, the team played from 1946 to 1950 before folding for good. In 1949 to 1950, they were a Brooklyn Dodgers affiliate known as the Cairo Dodgers.
