= Washington Browns =

- 1897; Washington, Indiana

Minor league affiliations
- Previous classes: Class C
- Previous leagues: Central League

Major league affiliations
- Previous teams: Unaffiliated

Team data
- Name: Washington Browns
- Colors: Brown & red

The Washington Browns were a minor league baseball team from Washington, Indiana, that played in the Class C Central League in 1897.

== Team history ==
On February 7, 1897, the Washington Browns were formed as a charter member of the Class C Central League. Joining the Browns in the six-team league were the Cairo Egyptians, Evansville Brewers, Nashville Centennials, Paducah Little Colonels, and Terre Haute Hottentots. Washington's uniforms were brown and red.

Severe financial problems forced the Washington team to disband on July 20, 1897. With low home attendance, the local Athletic Association had contributed $12,000 to support the franchise before it folded. The entire league was facing the same financial hardships and followed suit in folding. As of July 19, 1897, the final day of play, the Browns were in third place with a 33–32 (.508) record.
