= Evansville Brewers =

- 1897; Evansville, Indiana

Minor league affiliations
- Previous classes: Class C
- Previous leagues: Central League

Major league affiliations
- Previous teams: Unaffiliated

Minor league titles
- Pennants (1): 1897

Team data
- Name: Evansville Brewers
- Colors: Cadet blue & white

The Evansville Brewers were a minor league baseball team from Evansville, Indiana, that played in the Class C Central League in 1897.

== Team history ==
On February 7, 1897, the Evansville Brewers were formed as a charter member of the Class C Central League. Joining the Brewers in the six-team league were the Cairo Egyptians, Nashville Centennials, Paducah Little Colonels, Terre Haute Hottentots, and Washington Browns. Evansville's uniforms were cadet blue with white trimmings.

The first game of the season took place on April 28 at Nashville's Athletic Park. The Brewers defeated the Centennials, 3–2, in front of a crowd of approximately 500 spectators. Severe financial problems throughout the circuit forced the league to disband on July 20. As of July 19, the final day of play, the Brewers were in first place with a 41–30 (.577) record, making them the de facto league champions.
