= Central League (1897) =

- Sport: Baseball
- Founded: 1897
- Folded: 1897
- President: George Simons
- No. of teams: 6
- Country: United States
- Last champion: Evansville Brewers

The Central League was a Class C league of minor league baseball that operated in the United States in 1897. Representatives met to organize in Evansville, Indiana, on January 20, 1897. George Simmons was elected president, secretary, and treasurer. While the exact league lineup was not finalized at the meeting, it was resolved that the circuit was to consist of six teams who would pay a $500 deposit to guarantee they would play the entire season, and player salaries were capped at $900 per team. Officials met again on February 7 in Evansville to solidify the league's membership, and franchises were granted to clubs in Cairo, Illinois; Evansville, Terre Haute, and Washington, Indiana; Paducah, Kentucky; and Nashville, Tennessee.

It was reported the Nashville Centennials franchise relocated on June 4, 1897.

Severe financial problems throughout the circuit forced the league to disband on July 20. As of July 19, the final day of play, the Evansville Brewers were in first place with a 41–30 (.577) record, making them the de facto league champions.

== League standings ==
Central League standings (as of July 19)
Team	Games	Won	Lost	Win %	Finish	GB
Evansville Brewers	71	41	30	.577	1st	—
Nashville Centennials/Henderson	70	39	31	.557	2nd	1 1/2
Washington Browns	65	33	32	.508	3rd	5
Terre Haute Hottentots	67	31	36	.463	4th	8
Paducah Little Colonels	68	31	37	.456	5th	8 1/2
Cairo Egyptians	69	30	39	.435	6th	10
