= Charlie Petty =

American baseball player (1866–1928)

- Pitcher
- Born: January 28, 1866; Nashville, Tennessee, U.S.
- Died: December 7, 1928 (aged 62); Detroit, Michigan, U.S.
- Batted: Unknown Threw: Right

MLB debut
- July 30, 1889, for the Cincinnati Red Stockings (AA)

Last MLB appearance
- August 17, 1894, for the Cleveland Spiders

MLB statistics
- Win–loss record: 10-15
- Strikeouts: 40
- Earned run average: 5.41
- Stats at Baseball Reference

Teams
- Cincinnati Red Stockings (AA) (1889); New York Giants (1893); Washington Senators (1891–99) (1894); Cleveland Spiders (1894)

Charles E. Petty (January 28, 1866 – December 7, 1928) was an American Major League Baseball pitcher. He pitched all or part of three seasons in the majors, between 1889 and 1894, for the Cincinnati Red Stockings (AA), New York Giants, Washington Senators (1891–99), and Cleveland Spiders.
