= Pat Dillard =

American baseball player (1873–1907)

- Outfielder / Infielder
- Born: June 12, 1873; Chattanooga, Tennessee, U.S.
- Died: July 22, 1907 (aged 34); Denver, Colorado, U.S.
- Batted: Left Threw: Right

MLB debut
- April 21, 1900, for the St. Louis Cardinals

Last MLB appearance
- August 18, 1900, for the St. Louis Cardinals

MLB statistics
- Batting average: .230
- Home runs: 0
- Runs batted in: 12
- Stats at Baseball Reference

Teams
- St. Louis Cardinals (1900)

Robert Lee "Pat" Dillard (June 12, 1873 – July 22, 1907) was an American professional baseball player from 1896 to 1906. He played one season in Major League Baseball for the St. Louis Cardinals. Dillard was 6 feet tall and weighed 180 pounds.

== Career ==
Dillard was born in Chattanooga, Tennessee, in 1873. He started his professional baseball career in 1896, when he played for the Southern Association's Montgomery Senators and Mobile Blackbirds. That season, he had a batting average of .307 in 81 games. Dillard then spent most of the next three seasons with the Detroit Tigers of the Western League. He batted a career-high .350 there in 1897.

In September 1899, Dillard was purchased by the St. Louis Perfectos (later named the Cardinals). He was on the team's roster for most of the 1900 season and appeared in 57 games, mostly as an outfielder and a third baseman. He batted .230 with 24 runs scored and 12 runs batted in. On June 18, he made nine putouts at third in a game against the Cincinnati Reds; this set a single-game MLB record for most putouts by a third baseman. Dillard was sent to the minor league Chicago White Stockings in August, and according to Sporting Life, he initially refused to report to the team. However, he did join Chicago on August 27 and batted .194 there for the rest of the season.

Over the next few years, Dillard continued to play in the minors. He batted .311 for the American Association's St. Paul Saints in 1902 and then spent three seasons in the Eastern League. In 1906, he played 12 games in the New England League before his baseball career ended. Around that time, Dillard had contracted a cold and then moved to a health resort in Colorado. He died of consumption on July 22, 1907.
