= Three-I League =

Baseball minor league that operated from 1901 to 1961

- Most recent season or competition: 1961 Three-I League season
- Classification: Class B (1902–1961) (Note: The league did not operate in 1918, 1933–1934, 1936, or 1943–1945.); Class D (1901)
- Sport: Baseball
- First season: 1901; 125 years ago
- Folded: 1961; 65 years ago
- President: Michael H. Sexton (1901–1904); Edward Holland (1905–1907); Tom Loftus (1908); Michael H. Sexton (1909); Albert R. Tearney (1910–1917, 1919–1924); L.J. Wylie (1924–1932, 1935); Tom Fairweather (1937–1942, 1946–1950); Vern McMillan (1951); Hal Totten (1952–1959); Vern Hoscheit (1960–1961)
- No. of teams: 31
- Country: United States of America
- Most titles: 8 Evansville Braves/ Bees/ Hubs: (1957; 1956; 1954; 1952; 1949; 1941; 1938; 1930)

The Three-I League, (Note: Also spelled Three-Eye League or 3-Eye League.) formally known as the Illinois–Indiana–Iowa League, was a Class B level Minor League Baseball organization that operated for the better part of 60 seasons, with teams based in Illinois, Indiana, Iowa, Kansas, Minnesota, Missouri, Nebraska and Wisconsin. The league began play in 1901 and disbanded after the 1961 season.

The Three-I League played from 1901 to 1961 with some interruptions due to world events: the league did not play in 1918 due to World War I and it had a break in 1933 and 1934 because of the Great Depression. After resuming play in 1935, it closed down in 1936, but reformed and had a six-year run from 1937 through 1942, before a break due to World War II. The league resumed play in 1946, lasting through 1961, where it was largely supplanted by the Midwest League. A Class B level league from 1902 throughout its lifespan, no other league survived for as long at that level.

== History ==
The Three-I League was founded in 1901 with Rock Island, Illinois native Michael H. Sexton serving as the first president. Eight charter members began play in 1901. The Bloomington Blues, Cedar Rapids Rabbitts, Davenport River Rats, Decatur Commodores, Evansville River Rats, Rock Island Islanders, Rockford Red Sox and Terre Haute Hottentots were the charter teams. Bloomington, Illinois, Decatur, Illinois and Terre Haute, Indiana had left the Central League to join expansion teams in Cedar Rapids, Iowa, Davenport, Iowa, Evansville, Indiana, Rockford, Illinois, and Rock Island, Illinois and form the Class D level league (equivalent to a Rookie-level league today). Two expansion teams, Davenport and Evansville, were known as the River Rats.

For the second season, 1902, the league became a Class B level league (equivalent to a short-season Class A league before 2021 and a Low-A league today), a classification it retained for the next 59 seasons of league operation.

The Three-I League was inactive during some years of World War I (1918) and World War II (1943–1945), as well as part of the Great Depression (1933–34, 1936), like many minor leagues that were forced to suspend operations or disband during those severe times.

As with many minor leagues, especially at the lower classifications, league membership fluctuated a great deal over its six decades. Overall, the league hosted teams in 31 cities during its existence. At various times it had teams in such medium-sized cities as Cedar Rapids, Davenport, Bloomington, Decatur, Danville, Peoria, Springfield, Evansville and Terre Haute. It was a Class B league in the old classification system that ran from Class D up to Class Triple-A.

The 1955 Keokuk Kernels are ranked #30 in the Top–100 All–Time minor league teams by MiLB.com. The Kernels finished with a 92–34 record and were led by Russ Nixon and Mudcat Grant.

Since 1956 its territory had largely been supplanted by the Midwest League, which began play in 1947 as the Class D level Illinois State League. After 1956 there were no Illinois or Indiana teams in the league. The final 1961 Three-I League franchises were the Fox Cities Foxes, Burlington Bees, Topeka Reds, Lincoln Chiefs, Cedar Rapids Braves and Des Moines Demons. After the 1961 season, Burlington jumped to the Midwest League seeking a Class D affiliation with the Pittsburgh Pirates, and the Three-I League lacked the influence to stop them. With only four major league clubs offering full affiliations with Three-I teams, the league ceased operations on 7 January 1962. The Fox Cities and Cedar Rapids teams followed Burlington to the Midwest League.

The league's unique name made it a convenient reference point for any mention of the minor leagues. Casey Stengel made the following comment in later life, evidently still feeling stung from having been traded by the New York Giants to the Boston Braves in the 1923–1924 off-season, despite having hit 2 game-winning home runs in the World Series: "It's lucky I didn't hit 3 home runs in three games, or McGraw would have traded me to the 3-I League!"

== Three-I League cities and teams ==
- Alton, Illinois:
  - Alton Blues, 1917
- Appleton, Wisconsin:
  - Fox Cities Foxes, 1959–1961
- Bloomington, Illinois:
  - Bloomington Blues, 1901–1902
  - Bloomington Bloomers, 1903–1910, 1912–1917, 1919–1929, 1935, 1938–1939
  - Bloomington Cubs, 1930–1931
  - Bloomington Bengals, 1937
- Burlington, Iowa:
  - Burlington Flints, 1952–1953
  - Burlington Bees, 1954–1961
- Cedar Rapids, Iowa:
  - Cedar Rapids Rabbits, 1901–1909, 1920–1921
  - Cedar Rapids Raiders, 1938–1942
  - Cedar Rapids Indians, 1950–1954
  - Cedar Rapids Raiders 1957
  - Cedar Rapids Braves, 1958–1961
- Clinton, Iowa:
  - Clinton Infants, 1907–1908
  - Clinton Owls, 1937–1938
  - Clinton Giants, 1939–1941
- Danville, Illinois:
  - Danville Speakers, 1910–1914
  - Danville Veterans, 1922–1932
  - Danville Dodgers, 1946–1950
- Davenport, Iowa:
  - Davenport River Rats, 1901–1904
  - Davenport Riversides, 1905
  - Davenport Knickerbockers, 1906
  - Davenport Prodigals, 1909–1912
  - Davenport Blue Sox, 1913–1916
  - Davenport Cubs, 1946–1947
  - Davenport Pirates, 1948–1949
  - Davenport Quads, 1950
  - Davenport Tigers, 1951–1952
  - Davenport DavSox, 1957–1958
- Decatur, Illinois:
  - Decatur Commodores, 1901–1909,
  - Decatur Nomads, 1911
  - Decatur Commodores 1912–1915, 1922–1932, 1935, 1937–1942, 1946–1948
  - Decatur Cubs, 1949
  - Decatur Commodores 1950
- Des Moines, Iowa:
  - Des Moines Demons, 1959–1961
- Dubuque, Iowa:
  - Dubuque Shamrocks, 1903–1905
  - Dubuque Dubs, 1906–1910,
  - Dubuque Hustlers, 1911
  - Dubuque Dubs 1912–1915
- Evansville, Indiana:
  - Evansville River Rats, 1901–1902
  - Evansville Evas, 1919–1923
  - Evansville Little Evas, 1924
  - Evansville Pocketeers, 1925
  - Evansville Hubs, 1926–1931
  - Evansville Bees, 1938–1942
  - Evansville Braves, 1946–1957
- Fort Wayne, Indiana:
  - Fort Wayne Chiefs, 1935
- Freeport, Illinois:
  - Freeport Comeons, 1915
- Green Bay, Wisconsin:
  - Green Bay Bluejays, 1958–1959
  - Green Bay Dodgers, 1960
- Hannibal, Missouri:
  - Hannibal Mules, 1916–1917
- Joliet, Illinois:
  - Joliet Standards, 1903
- Keokuk, Iowa:
  - Keokuk Kernels, 1952–1957
- Lincoln, Nebraska:
  - Lincoln Chiefs, 1959–1961
- Madison, Wisconsin:
  - Madison Blues, 1940–1942
- Moline, Illinois:
  - Moline Plowboys, 1914–1917, 1919–1923, 1937–1941
- Peoria, Illinois:
  - Peoria Distillers, 1905–1917
  - Peoria Tractors, 1919–1932, 1935
  - Peoria Reds, 1937
  - Peoria Chiefs, 1953–1957
- Quincy, Illinois:
  - Quincy Infants, 1911
  - Quincy Old Soldiers, 1912
  - Quincy Gems, 1913–1917
  - Quincy Red Birds, 1925–1927
  - Quincy Indians, 1928–1932.
  - Quincy Gems 1946–1956
- Rochester, Minnesota:
  - Rochester A's, 1958
- Rock Island, Illinois:
  - Rock Island Islanders, 1901–1911, 1916–1917, 1921
- Rockford, Illinois:
  - Rockford Red Sox, 1901–1904
  - Rockford Wakes, 1915–1916
  - Rockford Rox, 1917, 1919–1923
- Sioux City, Iowa:
  - Sioux City Soos, 1959–1960
- Springfield, Illinois:
  - Springfield Foot Trackers, 1903
  - Springfield Hustlers, 1904
  - Springfield Senators, 1905–1912, 1925–1932, 1935
  - Springfield Watchmakers, 1913–1914
  - Springfield Browns, 1938–1942, 1946–1949
- Terre Haute, Indiana:
  - Terre Haute Hottentots, 1901–1902
  - Terre Haute Browns, 1919–1920
  - Terre Haute Tots, 1921–1932, 1935, 1937
  - Terre Haute Phillies, 1946–1954
  - Terre Haute Huts, 1955–1956
- Topeka, Kansas:
  - Topeka Hawks, 1959
  - Topeka Reds, 1960–1961
- Waterloo, Iowa:
  - Waterloo Boosters, 1910–1911
  - Waterloo Red Hawks, 1938–1939
  - Waterloo Hawks, 1940–1942, 1947
  - Waterloo White Hawks, 1946, 1948–1956
- Winona, Minnesota:
  - Winona A's, 1958

== Year-by-year (1901–1932) ==
1901 Illinois–Indiana–Iowa League
Terre Haute won the title behind the impressive pitching of Mordecai Brown, future Chicago Cubs mound star.

Team Name	Record
Terre Haute Hottentots	72–39
Bloomington Blues	68–44
Cedar Rapids Rabbits	67–45
Rockford Red Sox	57–55
Davenport River Rats	51–61
Evansville River Rats	47–65
Rock Island Islanders	45–66
Decatur Commodores	40–72

1902 Illinois–Indiana–Iowa League

Rockford Red Sox	74–52
Terre Haute Hottentots	70–53
Cedar Rapids Rabbits	64–55
Rock Island Islanders	58–61
Davenport River Rats	59–63
Evansville River Rats	57–67
Decatur Commodores	55–69
Bloomington Blues	54–71

1903 Illinois–Indiana–Iowa League
Evansville and Terre Haute joined the Central League. New teams in Dubuque, Iowa and Joliet, Illinois formed. Joliet, with a record of 14–19, moved to Springfield, Illinois on June 12, where they had a record of 28–61.

Bloomington Bloomers	72–47
Decatur Commodores	67–51
Davenport River Rats	65–53
Rock Island Islanders	64–54
Cedar Rapids Rabbits	60–60
Rockford Red Sox	58–60
Dubuque Shamrocks	49–72
Joliet Standards/Springfield Foot Trackers	42–80

1904 Illinois–Indiana–Iowa League

Springfield Hustlers	72–48
Cedar Rapids Rabbits	70–52
Dubuque Shamrocks	69–54
Bloomington Bloomers	60–61
Decatur Commodores	59–62
Rock Island Islanders	57–65
Davenport River Rats	52–69
Rockford Red Sox	48–76

1905 Illinois–Indiana–Iowa League
The Rockford team folded, and a new team in Peoria, Illinois formed.

Dubuque Shamrocks	70–53
Rock Island Islanders	68–55
Springfield Senators	64–58
Decatur Commodores	63–58
Cedar Rapids Rabbits	63–61
Bloomington Bloomers	60–65
Davenport Riversides	56–67
Peoria Distillers	48–75

After the season ended, Cedar Rapids lost to the Burlington, Iowa team from the Iowa State League 4 games to 3.

1906 Illinois–Indiana–Iowa League

Cedar Rapids Rabbits	79–43
Peoria Distillers	74–48
Dubuque Dubs	64–55
Springfield Senators	64–56
Rock Island Islanders	58–66
Decatur Commodores	48–67
Bloomington Bloomers	51–74
Davenport Knickerbockers	45–74

1907 Illinois–Indiana–Iowa League
The Davenport team folded. The team from Clinton, Iowa joined after leaving the Iowa State League.

Rock Island Islanders	86–46
Decatur Commodores	80–47
Springfield Senators	81–50
Peoria Distillers	77–52
Cedar Rapids Rabbits	72–61
Clinton Infants	53–78
Bloomington Bloomers	51–79
Dubuque Dubs	22–109

1908 Illinois–Indiana–Iowa League

Springfield Senators	82–54
Decatur Commodores	77–59
Cedar Rapids Rabbits	69–63
Peoria Distillers	77–52
Dubuque Dubs	67–69
Bloomington Bloomers	64–73
Rock Island Islanders	59–76
Clinton Adults	55–78

1909 Illinois–Indiana–Iowa League
The Clinton team folded. A new team in Davenport, Iowa formed.

Rock Island Islanders	90–48
Springfield Senators	81–53
Davenport Prodigals	77–59
Burlington Bloomers	70–67
Peoria Distillers	69–67
Dubuque Dubs	64–71
Decatur Commodores	63–73
Cedar Rapids Rabbits	31–107

1910 Illinois–Indiana–Iowa League
After the previous disappointing season, Cedar Rapids folded. The Decatur team moved to the Northern Association. The team from Waterloo, Iowa left the Central Association to join here. A new team from Danville, Illinois formed and joined the league as well.

Springfield Senators	88–48
Rock Island Islanders	81–56
Peoria Distillers	75–64
Waterloo Boosters	72–67
Bloomington Bloomers	60–76
Dubuque Dubs	60–79
Davenport Prodigals	59–80
Danville Speakers	57–82

1911 Illinois–Indiana–Iowa League
The team from Bloomington folded. The Quincy, Illinois team from the Central Association joined the league. The Springfield team, with a 12–4 record, moved to Decatur, Illinois on May 31, where their record was 57–56.

Peoria Distillers	76–59
Springfield Senators/Decatur Nomads	69–60
Quincy Infants	71–63
Danville Speakers	69–62
Davenport Prodigals	69–69
Dubuque Hustlers	67–70
Waterloo Boosters	59–76
Rock Island Islanders	58–79

1912 Illinois–Indiana–Iowa League
The teams from Rock Island and Waterloo folded. New teams from Springfield, Illinois and Bloomington, Indiana joined the league.

Springfield Senators	90–44
Davenport Prodigals	75–60
Decatur Commodores	69–67
Quincy Old Soldiers	67–70
Dubuque Dubs	65–73
Danville Speakers	63–71
Bloomington Bloomers	58–78
Peoria Distillers	56–80

1913 Illinois–Indiana–Iowa League

Quincy Gems	79–60
Dubuque Dubs	74–62
Davenport Blue Sox	68–66
Danville Speakers	69–68
Decatur Commodores	67–68
Springfield Watchmakers	66–70
Bloomington Bloomers	64–71
Peoria Distillers	57–79

1914 Illinois–Indiana–Iowa League
The Danville team, with a record of 26–53, moved to Moline, Illinois on July 14, where their record was 20–33.

Davenport Blue Sox	83–52
Peoria Distillers	81–56
Springfield Watchmakers	72–60
Decatur Commodores	72–64
Dubuque Dubs	64–69
Quincy Gems	61–71
Bloomington Bloomers	56–77
Danville Speakers/Moline Plowboys	46–86

1915 Illinois–Indiana–Iowa League
The Springfield team folded. A new team in Rockford, Illinois formed. Dubuque moved to Freeport, Illinois during the season. The Decatur team folded on August 10. The league adopted a playoff system in which the team with the best record in the first half of the season would play the team with the best record in the second half of the season.

Moline Plowboys	75–51 (2nd half winner)
Davenport Blue Sox	76–52 (1st half winner)
Rockford Wakes	72–58
Quincy Gems	62–56
Peoria Distillers	68–63
Dubuque Dubs/Freeport Comeons	48–76
Bloomington Bloomers	48–76
Decatur Commodores	37–57

Moline beat Davenport 4 games to 2 for the title.

1916 Illinois–Indiana–Iowa League
The Freeport team folded. New teams in Hannibal, Missouri and Rock Island, Illinois formed and joined the league. The playoff system was apparently dropped.

Peoria Distillers	84–50
Hannibal Mules	79–57
Bloomington Bloomers	76–56
Rockford Wakes	67–66
Moline Plowboys	59–76
Rock Island Islanders	57–76
Quincy Gems	57–77
Davenport Blue Sox	56–77

1917 Illinois–Indiana–Iowa League
The Davenport team folded. A new team in Alton, Illinois formed and joined the league.

Peoria Distillers	43–23
Rockford Rox	39–21
Hannibal Mules	39–27
Rock Island Islanders	36–26
Quincy Gems	27–38
Moline Plowboys	27–38
Bloomington Bloomers	25–37
Alton Blues	18–44

1918, The league suspended operations because of World War I.

1919 Illinois–Indiana–Iowa League
The teams in Alton, Hannibal, Quincy, and Rock Island folded. New teams in Evansville, Indiana and Terre Haute, Indiana formed and joined the league.

Bloomington Bloomers	80–41
Peoria Tractors	68–54
Evansville Black Sox	63–58
Rockford Rox	63–60
Terre Haute Browns	50–70
Moline Plowboys	40–81

1920 Illinois–Indiana–Iowa League
New teams in Cedar Rapids, Iowa and Rock Island, Illinois formed and joined the league. Evansville changed their names to the "Evas".

Bloomington Bloomers	82–57
Evansville Evas	80–56
Rockford Rox	70–70
Moline Plowboys	69–70
Cedar Rapids Rabbits	68–69
Peoria Tractors	67–71
Terre Haute Browns	58–77
Rock Island Islanders	57–81

1921 Illinois–Indiana–Iowa League

Moline Plowboys	78–55
Rockford Rox	72–64
Terre Haute Tots	70–65
Peoria Tractors	70–69
Evansville Evas	67–69
Bloomington Bloomers	65–69
Cedar Rapids Rabbits	62–72
Rock Island Islanders	57–78

1922 Illinois–Indiana–Iowa League
The teams in Cedar Rapids and Rock Island moved to the Mississippi Valley League. New teams in Danville and Decatur formed and joined the league.

Terre Haute Tots	85–51
Decatur Commodores	78–58
Peoria Tractors	76–60
Evansville Evas	76–64
Rockford Rox	74–65
Bloomington Bloomers	63–75
Danville Veterans	50–87
Moline Plowboys	49–89

1923 Illinois–Indiana–Iowa League

Decatur Commodores	81–54
Rockford Rox	76–63
Terre Haute Tots	71–60
Bloomington Bloomers	72–64
Evansville Evas	72–65
Peoria Tractors	71–65
Danville Veterans	55–81
Moline Plowboys	45–91

1924 Illinois–Indiana–Iowa League
The Rockford team folded. The Moline team moved to the Mississippi Valley League.

Terre Haute Tots	75–62
Evansville Little Evas	75–64
Bloomington Bloomers	71–64
Peoria Tractors	71–66
Danville Veterans	59–75
Decatur Commodores	58–78

1925 Illinois–Indiana–Iowa League
New teams in Quincy and Springfield formed and joined the league.

Peoria Tractors	89–48
Terre Haute Tots	81–54
Evansville Pocketeers	72–63
Danville Veterans	69–66
Decatur Commodores	62–73
Bloomington Bloomers	56–74
Springfield Senators	56–79
Quincy Red Birds	54–82

1926 Illinois–Indiana–Iowa League

Springfield Senators	77–59
Peoria Tractors	75–62
Terre Haute Tots	73–61
Danville Veterans	72–65
Evansville Hubs	72–66
Decatur Commodores	69–67
Quincy Red Birds	62–75
Bloomington Bloomers	43–88

Springfield played Bay City of the Michigan State League and won 4 games to none. They were leading against Des Moines of the Western League 3 games to 1 when the series was canceled due to cold weather.

1927 Illinois–Indiana–Iowa League

Danville Veterans	86–50
Peoria Tractors	87–51
Springfield Senators	72–66
Terre Haute Tots	70–66
Decatur Commodores	62–70
Quincy Red Birds	63–75
Bloomington Bloomers	55–83
Evansville Hubs	50–84

1928 Illinois–Indiana–Iowa League
The league returned to the playoff format in which the team with the best record in the first half of the season played the team with the best records in the second half of the season for the title.

Decatur Commodores	81–49 (2nd half winner)
Terre Haute Tots	75–59 (1st half winner)
Danville Veterans	69–57
Peoria Tractors	69–66
Evansville Hubs	62–68
Bloomington Bloomers	61–69
Springfield Senators	60–79
Quincy Indians	50–85

Decatur beat Terre Haute for the title 4 games to 1, with 1 tie.

1929 Illinois–Indiana–Iowa League
Two teams with the nickname "Tractors" played in the league this season.

Quincy Indians	82–56
Decatur Commodores	81–57
Evansville Hubs	79–57
Terre Haute Tots	72–66
Bloomington Bloomers	70–70
Peoria Tractors	61–76
Springfield Tractors	59–77
Danville Veterans	46–91

Quincy played Canton of the Central League after the season ended and lost 4 games to 2.

1930 Illinois–Indiana–Iowa League
The league returned to the best record in the 1st half vs. best record in the 2nd half playoff system.

Evansville Hubs	79–55 (2nd half winner)
Quincy Indians	78–58
Decatur Commodores	77–59
Danville Veterans	71–67 (1st half winner)
Springfield Senators	62–70
Peoria Tractors	57–77
Bloomington Cubs	57–78
Terre Haute Tots	53–76

Danville defeated Evansville 4 games to 2 for the title. Danville went on to play Springfield of the Central League and lead 3 games to 2 when the series was cancelled because of poor attendance.

1931 Illinois–Indiana–Iowa League

Springfield Senators	72–45 (1st half winner)
Quincy Indians	67–49 (2nd half winner)
Evansville Hubs	67–58
Decatur Commodores	64–57
Bloomington Cubs	58–61
Terre Haute Tots	55–68
Peoria Tractors	51–68
Danville Veterans	44–72

Quincy beat Springfield 4 games to 2 for the championship.

1932 Illinois–Indiana–Iowa League
The teams in Bloomington and Evansville folded before the season, and the Springfield and Decatur teams folded on July 12.

Team Name	Affiliation	Record
Terre Haute Tots		42–27 (1st half winner)
Peoria Tractors		20–38 (2nd half winner)
Quincy Indians	Cleveland Indians	38–31
Danville Veterans	St. Louis Cardinals	29–39
Springfield Senators		32–37
Decatur Commodores		24–43

The Terre Haute, Peoria, Quincy, and Danville teams all folded on July 15, as did the league itself. The league was restarted in 1935, 1937–1942, and 1946–1961.

== Year–by–year 1935 to 1949 ==
1935 Illinois–Indiana–Iowa League

Team standings	W	L	PCT	GB	Managers
Bloomington Bloomers	75	44	.630	—	Burleigh Grimes
Springfield Senators	74	45	.622	1	Bob Coleman
Decatur Commodores	59	56	.513	14	John Butler/ Cliff Knox
Terre Haute Tots	57	61	.483	17½	Bill Burwell
Fort Wayne Chiefs	52	71	.423	25	Bruno Betzel
Peoria Tractors	38	78	.328	35½	Jack Sheehan / Bill Rodgers

Playoff: Springfield 4 games, Bloomington 2. Bloomington was declared the winner when Springfield refused to replay protested final game that was upheld by the league president.

Player statistics
Player	Team	Stat	Tot	Player	Team	Stat	Tot
Chet Laabs	Fort Wayne	BA	.384	Max Macon	Bloomington	W	19
Hersh Martin	Bloomington	Runs	112	Johnny Hutchings	Peoria	SO	166
Jimmy Outlaw	Decatur	Hits	157	Lefty Smoll	Springfield	PCT	.765 13–4
Chet Laabs	Fort Wayne	RBI	96				
Chet Laabs	Fort Wayne	HR	24				

1937 Illinois–Indiana–Iowa League
schedule

Team standings	W	L	PCT	GB	Managers
Clinton Owls	75	36	.676	—	Clyde Sukeforth
Moline Plowboys	74	41	.643	3	Mike Gazella
Decatur Commodores	53	64	.453	25	George Payne
Peoria Reds	45	66	.405	30	Ben Tincup / Wayne Blackburn
Bloomington Bengals	21	38	.356	NA	Joseph Sims
Terre Haute Tots	15	38	.283	NA	Walter Holke

Bloomington and Terre Haute disbanded July 3, at the end of the first half.
Playoff: Moline 4 games, Clinton 2.

Player statistics
Player	Team	Stat	Tot	Player	Team	Stat	Tot
Hank Majeski	Moline	BA	.345	Kirby Higbe	Moline	W	21
George Cisar	Clinton	Runs	98	Kirby Higbe	Moline	SO	257
Joe Mene	Moline	Hits	164	Kirby Higbe	Moline	PCT	.808 21–5
Bert Haas	Clinton	HR	13				

1938 Illinois–Indiana–Iowa League
schedule

Team standings	W	L	PCT	GB	Attend	Managers
Evansville Bees	77	47	.621	—	98,817	Bob Coleman
Decatur Commodores	68	58	.540	10	50,766	Tony Kaufmann
Moline Plowboys	67	59	.532	11	22,684	Mike Gazella
Springfield Browns	63	60	.512	13½	66,944	Walter Holke
Waterloo Red Hawks	59	65	.476	18	43,980	Lennie Backer
Cedar Rapids Raiders	56	63	.471	18½	39,211	Cap Crossley
Bloomington Bloomers	56	65	.463	19½	24,368	Bob O'Farrell
Clinton Owls	46	75	.380	29½	35,119	Ollie Marquardt

Playoffs: Decatur 3 games, Springfield 2; Mobile 3 games, Evansville 1.
Finals: Decatur 4 games, Moline 1.

Player statistics
Player	Team	Stat	Tot	Player	Team	Stat	Tot
Lou Novikoff	Moline	BA	.367	Emil Bildilli	Springfield	W	18
Eddie Lake	Decatur	Runs	117	Floyd Giebell	Evansville	W	18
Lou Novikoff	Moline	Hits	186	Emil Bildilli	Springfield	SO	185
Lou Novikoff	Moline	RBI	114	Floyd Giebell	Evansville	ERA	1.98
Frank Piet	Springfield	HR	25	Emil Bildilli	Springfield	PCT	.818 18–4

1939 Illinois–Indiana–Iowa League
schedule

Team standings	W	L	PCT	GB	Attend	Managers
Cedar Rapids Raiders	73	46	.613	—	56,399	Ollie Marquardt
Evansville Bees	73	48	.603	1	81,371	Bob Coleman
Decatur Commodores	68	51	.571	5	49,710	Tony Kaufmann
Springfield Browns	65	55	.542	8½	37,916	Walter Holke
Clinton Giants	63	58	.521	11	41,712	Blondy Ryan
Bloomington Bloomers	49	73	.402	25½	14,005	Bud Connolly
Moline Plowboys	49	73	.402	25½	20,911	Mike Gazella
Waterloo Red Hawks	42	78	.350	31½	28,935	Cap Crossley

Playoffs: Springfield 3 games, Evansville 1; Decatur 3 games, Cedar Rapids 1.
Finals: Springfield 3 games, Decatur 2.

Player statistics
Player	Team	Stat	Tot	Player	Team	Stat	Tot
Del Jones	Cedar Rapids	BA	.362	Joe Callahan	Evansville	W	19
Del Jones	Cedar Rapids	Runs	120	Mike Naymick	Cedar Rapids	SO	181
Del Jones	Cedar Rapids	Hits	168	Joe Callahan	Evansville	ERA	1.86
George Binks	Cedar Rapids	RBI	116	Roger Wolff	Cedar Rapids	PCT	.750 15–5
Fred Stroble	Springfield	HR	21				

1940 Illinois–Indiana–Iowa League

Team standings	W	L	PCT	GB	Attend	Managers
Cedar Rapids Raiders	74	51	.592	—	46,475	Ollie Marquardt
Decatur Commodores	73	52	.584	1	37,667	Tony Kaufmann / Boyce Morrow / Lou Scoffic
Springfield Browns	73	53	.579	1½	56,569	Art Scharein
Evansville Braves	68	55	.553	5	60,815	Bob Coleman
Clinton Giants	62	57	.521	9	40,277	Josh Billings
Madison Blues	61	62	.496	12	36,740	Bud Connolly
Moline Plowboys	46	78	.471	27½	13,639	Mike Gazella
Waterloo White Hawks	36	85	.298	36	23,441	John Fitzpatrick / Frederick Bedore

Playoffs: Cedar Rapids 3 games, Springfield 0; Decatur 3 games, Evansville 2.
Finals: Cedar Rapids 3 games, Decatur 1.

Player statistics
Player	Team	Stat	Tot	Player	Team	Stat	Tot
Lou Scoffic	Decatur	BA	.358	Mike Kash	Madison	W	20
Chuck Workman	Cedar Rapids	Runs	108	Max Surkont	Decatur	SO	212
Lou Scoffic	Decatur	Hits	164	Max Surkont	Decatur	ERA	2.50
Don Manno	Evansville	RBI	113	Max Surkont	Decatur	PCT	.792 19–5
Chuck Workman	Cedar Rapids	HR	29				

1941 Illinois–Indiana–Iowa League
schedule

Team standings	W	L	PCT	GB	Attend	Managers
Evansville Bees	80	45	.640	—	69,156	Bob Coleman
Cedar Rapids Raiders	72	49	.595	6	40,323	Ollie Marquardt
Decatur Commodores	67	56	.545	12	38,485	Dib Williams
Springfield Browns	65	59	.524	14½	41,194	Art Scharein
Waterloo White Hawks	59	65	.476	20½	55,456	Louis Brower / Johnny Mostil
Clinton Giants	57	68	.456	23	25,861	Josh Billings
Madison Blues	52	71	.423	27	28,434	Ivy Griffin
Moline Plowboys	43	82	.344	37	16,534	Joe Mowry

Playoffs: Decatur 3 games, Evansville 2; Cedar Rapids 3 games, Springfield 1.
Finals: Cedar Rapids 3 games, Decatur 2.

Player statistics
Player	Team	Stat	Tot	Player	Team	Stat	Tot
Hank Edwards	Cedar Rapids	BA	.364	Warren Spahn	Madison	W	19
Hank Edwards	Cedar Rapids	Runs	101	John Clay	Decatur	SO	204
Delbert Jones	Cedar Rapids	Runs	101	Warren Spahn	Madison	ERA	1.83
Hank Edwards	Cedar Rapids	Hits	172	Warren Spahn	Madison	PCT	.760 19–6
Hank Edwards	Cedar Rapids	RBI	113				
Hank Edwards	Cedar Rapids	HR	23				

1942 Illinois–Indiana–Iowa League

Team standings	W	L	PCT	GB	Managers
Cedar Rapids Raiders	74	43	.632	—	Ollie Marquardt
Springfield Browns	67	48	.583	6	Jimmy Adair
Evansville Bees	65	54	.546	10	Bob Coleman
Madison Blues	55	62	.470	19	Walter Millies
Waterloo White Hawks	47	71	.398	27½	Johnny Mostil
Decatur Commodores	45	75	.375	30½	Abe White / Tony Kaufmann

Playoffs: Cedar Rapids 3 games, Evansville 2; Madison 3 games, Springfield 1.
Finals: Cedar Rapids 3 games, Madison 0.

Player statistics
Player	Team	Stat	Tot	Player	Team	Stat	Tot
Whitey Platt	Madison	BA	.395	Bryan Stephens	Cedar Rapids	W	20
Blas Monaco	Cedar Rapids	Runs	95	Len Perme	Waterloo	SO	204
Ducky Detweiler	Evansville	Hits	149	John Pavlick	Springfield	ERA	2.96
Pat Seerey	Cedar Rapids	RBI	91	Bryan Stephens	Cedar Rapids	PCT	.833 20–4
Pat Seerey	Cedar Rapids	HR	33				

The league did not play in 1943, 1944 and 1945 due to World War II 1946 Illinois–Indiana–Iowa League

Team standings	W	L	PCT	GB	Managers
Davenport Cubs	76	44	.618	—	Bill Kelly
Danville Dodgers	76	44	.618	—	Jake Pitler / Paul Chervinko
Evansville Braves	68	51	.571	7½	Bob Coleman
Terre Haute Phillies	63	60	.512	14½	Ray Brubaker
Waterloo White Hawks	62	63	.496	16½	Johnny Mostil
Springfield Browns	58	67	.464	20½	Tony Robello
Decatur Commodores	43	72	.374	30½	Harrison Wickel
Quincy Gems	37	82	.311	38½	Edward Marleau / Cedric Durst

Playoffs: Davenport defeated Danville in a one-game playoff for first place; Evansville 3 games, Davenport 1. Terre Haute 3 games, Danville 1.
Finals: Evansville 3 games, Terre Haute 0.

Player statistics
Player	Team	Stat	Tot	Player	Team	Stat	Tot
Rube Walker	Davenport	BA	.354	Bob Kohout	Danville	W	14
Richard Welker	Terre Haute	Runs	105	Ken Manus	Waterloo	W	14
Cal Abrams	Danville	Hits	146	Charles Shipman	Evansville	W	14
Bill Sanders	Terre Haute	RBI	96	Ray Shore	Springfield	SO	157
Bill Sanders	Terre Haute	HR	14	Jean Davison	Davenport	ERA	2.18
Jim Christie	Terre Haute	HR	14	Jean Davison	Davenport	PCT	.867 13–2

1947 Illinois–Indiana–Iowa League

Team standings	W	L	PCT	GB	Attend	Managers
Danville Dodgers	79	47	.627	—	63,926	Paul Chervinko
Terre Haute Phillies	74	51	.592	4½	133,654	Ray Brubaker / Whitey Gluchoski / Jack Sanford
Springfield Browns	71	55	.563	8	58,009	Ben Huffman
Waterloo Hawks	71	55	.563	8	174,064	Johnny Mostil / Jack Onslow
Evansville Braves	70	55	.560	8½	133,163	Bob Coleman
Davenport Cubs	55	70	.440	23½	50,846	Dickie Kerr / Morrie Arnovich
Quincy Gems	50	75	.400	28½	100,096	Gordie Hinkle
Decatur Commodores	31	93	.250	47	33,069	Gene Corbett

Playoffs: Springfield defeated Waterloo in a playoff for third place; Danville 3 games, Springfield 2; Waterloo 3 games, Terre Haute 0.
Finals: Waterloo 4 games, Danville 1.

Player statistics
Player	Team	Stat	Tot	Player	Team	Stat	Tot
Hank Arft	Springfield	BA	.364	Ken Olson	Danville	W	22
Jerry Scala	Waterloo	Runs	116	John Perkovich	Waterloo	SO	207
Jerry Scala	Waterloo	Hits	163	John Perkovich	Waterloo	ERA	2.50
Ray Fletcher	Evansville	RBI	115	Ken Olson	Danville	PCT	.846 22–4
Ed Ehlers	Quincy	HR	22				

1948 Illinois–Indiana–Iowa League
schedule

Team standings	W	L	PCT	GB	Attend	Managers
Quincy Gems	81	45	.643	-	124,053	James Adlam
Danville Dodgers	72	51	.585	7½	62,284	Paul Chervinko
Evansville Braves	67	54	.554	11½	101,652	Bob Coleman
Terre Haute Phillies	65	57	.533	14	130,009	Pat Colgan / Dale Jones
Waterloo White Hawks	63	61	.508	17	170,018	Pete Fox
Springfield Browns	56	67	.455	23½	54,463	Hank Helf / Irv Hall
Decatur Commies	50	75	.400	30½	44,943	Red Lucas / Nelson Burbrink
Davenport Pirates	41	85	.325	40	45,711	Ival Goodman

Playoffs: Terre Haute 3 games, Danville 2. Evansville 3 games, Quincy 2.
Finals: Evansville 4 games, Terre Haute 0.

Player statistics
Player	Team	Stat	Tot	Player	Team	Stat	Tot
John Novosel	Springfield	BA	.339	Art Bohman	Quincy	W	16
Bob Marquis	Quincy	Runs	108	Lew Burdette	Quincy	W	16
Bob Marquis	Quincy	Hits	164	Glenn Thompson	Evansville	SO	230
Kite Thomas	Quincy	RBI	99	David Thieke	Danville	ERA	1.81
John Novosel	Springfield	HR	22	Glenn Thompson	Evansville	PCT	.789 15–4
Don Lenhardt	Springfield	HR	22				

1949 Illinois–Indiana–Iowa League
schedule

Team standings	W	L	PCT	GB	Attend	Managers
Evansville Braves	74	51	.592	—	145,657	Bob Coleman
Waterloo White Hawks	70	56	.556	4½	146,421	Ben Huffman / Frederick Shaffer
Terre Haute Phillies	69	56	.552	5	122,493	Lee Riley
Davenport Pirates	67	59	.532	7½	133,505	Bill Burwell
Quincy Gems	59	67	.468	15½	85,130	James Adlam
Decatur Cubs	55	70	.440	19	51,147	Morrie Arnovich
Danville Dodgers	55	70	.440	19	49,605	Lou Rochelli
Springfield Browns	53	73	.421	21½	48,952	Doc Crandall

Playoffs: Evansville 3 games, Terre Haute 2; Davenport 3 games, Waterloo 2.
Finals: Davenport 3 games, Evansville 0.

Player statistics
Player	Team	Stat	Tot	Player	Team	Stat	Tot
Emil Tellinger	Quincy	BA	.322	Bob Miller	Terre Haute	W	19
Herman Rhodes	Waterloo	Runs	86	Paul Stuffel	Terre Haute	SO	288
Robert Anderlik	Decatur	Hits	140	William Koszarek	Terre Haute	ERA	1.97
Ed McGhee	Waterloo	RBI	88	William Koszarek	Terre Haute	PCT	.875 14–2
Lloyd Lowe	Decatur	HR	15				
Emil Tellinger	Quincy	HR	15				

== Year-by-year 1950 to 1961 ==
1950 Illinois–Indiana–Iowa League
1950 Three-I League schedule

Team standings	W	L	PCT	GB	Attend	Managers
Terre Haute Phillies	78	48	.619	—	111,228	Dan Carnevale
Danville Dodgers	74	52	.587	4	51,616	Jim Bivin
Waterloo White Hawks	70	56	.556	8	119,244	Otto Denning
Quincy Gems	64	60	.516	13	53,322	James Adlam
Cedar Rapids Indians	59	67	.468	19	85,038	Billy Jurges
Evansville Braves	56	70	.444	22	102,865	Ernie White
Decatur Commodores	52	74	.413	26	35,516	Morrie Arnovich
Davenport Quads	49	75	.395	28	90,584	Gene Hasson

Playoffs: Terre Haute 3 games, Quincy 0; Danville 3 games, Waterloo 0.
Finals: Terre Haute 3 games, Danville 1.

Player statistics
Player	Team	Stat	Tot	Player	Team	Stat	Tot
Jim King	Cedar Rapids	BA	.332	Jacob Schmitt	Terre Haute	W	21
Jack Lillis	Danville	Runs	110	Niles Jordan	Terre Haute	SO	206
Frank Marchio	Quincy	Hits	162	Niles Jordan	Terre Haute	ERA	2.35
Frank Marchio	Quincy	RBI	112	Jacob Schmitt	Terre Haute	PCT	.808 21–5
Allen Thomas	Waterloo	HR	25				

1951 Illinois–Indiana–Iowa League
schedule

Team standings	W	L	PCT	GB	Attend	Managers
Terre Haute Phillies	75	55	.577	—	81,511	Skeeter Newsome
Evansville Braves	69	60	.535	5½	101,254	Bob Coleman
Quincy Gems	65	65	.500	10	62,503	Dutch Zwilling
Cedar Rapids Indians	64	66	.492	11	92,102	Kerby Farrell
Waterloo White Hawks	60	69	.466	14½	79,687	Otto Denning / Ed Taylor; Skeeter Webb
Davenport Tigers	56	74	.431	19	100,328	Marv Olson

Playoffs: Quincy 3 games, Terre Haute 1; Cedar Rapids 3 games, Evansville 2.
Finals: Quincy 3 games, Cedar Rapids 2.

Player statistics
Player	Team	Stat	Tot	Player	Team	Stat	Tot
Jim Command	Terre Haute	BA	.328	Alfred Dumouchelle	Evansville	W	17
James Deery	Terre Haute	Runs	103	Jack Urban	Quincy	W	17
Jim Command	Terre Haute	Hits	166	Bob P. Coleman	Cedar Rapids	W	17
Robert Erps	Davenport	RBI	97	Jack Urban	Quincy	SO	164
Bill Renna	Quincy	HR	26	Ben Johnson	Evansville	ERA	2.47
				Daniel Ramer	Terre Haute	PCT	.750 15–5

1952 Illinois–Indiana–Iowa League
schedule

Team standings	W	L	PCT	GB	Attend	Managers
Evansville Braves	74	47	.612	—	124,381	Bob Coleman
Terre Haute Phillies	75	49	.605	½	63,267	Skeeter Newsome
Burlington Flints	64	60	.516	11½	57,259	Len Schulte
Waterloo White Hawks	65	61	.515	11½	75,071	Skeeter Webb
Keokuk Kernels	56	66	.459	18½	64,931	Rudy Laskowski
Davenport Tigers	54	69	.439	21	71,989	Marv Owen
Quincy Gems	54	72	.429	22½	45,541	Paul Chervinko
Cedar Rapids Indians	53	71	.427	22½	94,428	Jimmy Bloodworth

Playoffs: Evansville 3 games, Burlington 2; Terre Haute 3 games, Waterloo 0.
Finals: Terre Haute 3 games, Evansville 1.

Player statistics
Player	Team	Stat	Tot	Player	Team	Stat	Tot
Art Pennington	Keokuk	BA	.349	George Yorke	Evansville	W	17
Art Pennington	Keokuk	Runs	126	Bud Daley	Cedar Rapids	SO	198
Chuck Harmon	Burlington	Hits	153	Gerald Speck	Waterloo	ERA	2.44
Horace Garner	Evansville	RBI	107	Stewart Alton	Evansville	PCT	.786 11–3
Robert Erps	Waterloo	HR	27				

1953 Illinois–Indiana–Iowa League
schedule

Team standings	W	L	PCT	GB	Attend	Managers
Terre Haute Phillies	76	52	.594	—	64,428	Hub Kittle
Quincy Gems	70	58	.547	6	75,363	Vern Hoscheit
Evansville Braves	70	59	.543	6½	88,438	Bob Coleman
Waterloo White Hawks	69	60	.535	7½	93,153	Zack Taylor
Peoria Chiefs	63	65	.492	13	124,866	Whitey Kurowski
Cedar Rapids Indians	63	65	.492	13	93,501	Al Kubski / William Prince
Keokuk Kernels	53	75	.414	23	76,405	Rudy Laskowski
Burlington Flints	49	79	.383	27	49,370	Johnny Vander Meer

Playoffs: Evansville 3 games, Terre Haute 2; Quincy 3 games, Waterloo 1.
Finals: Quincy 3 games, Evansville 0.

Player statistics
Player	Team	Stat	Tot	Player	Team	Stat	Tot
Bob Coats	Cedar Rapids	BA	.327	Jim Owens	Terre Haute	W	22
James Fishback	Peoria	Runs	107	Seth Morehead	Terre Haute	SO	206
Bob Coats	Cedar Rapids	Hits	162	Joe Stanka	Cedar Rapids	ERA	2.35
Ed Barbarito	Quincy	Hits	162	Jim Owens	Terre Haute	PCT	.733 22–8
Ed Barbarito	Quincy	RBI	127				
Marv Throneberry	Quincy	HR	30				

1954 Illinois–Indiana–Iowa League
schedule

Team standings	W	L	PCT	GB	Attend	Managers
Evansville Braves	81	54	.600	—	71,691	Bob Coleman
Keokuk Kernels	78	58	.574	3½	49,957	Jo-Jo White
Peoria Chiefs	73	63	.537	8½	78,497	Whitey Kurowski
Quincy Gems	71	64	.526	10	54,168	Vern Hoscheit
Waterloo White Hawks	66	69	.489	15	51,600	Walter Millies
Cedar Rapids Indians	63	72	.467	18	60,605	William Prince
Terre Haute Phillies	60	76	.441	21½	37,104	Hub Kittle
Burlington Bees	50	86	.368	31½	37,010	Doc Crandall

Playoffs: Peoria 3 games, Evansville 1; Quincy 3 games, Keokuk 1.
Finals: Quincy 3 games, Peoria 0.

Player statistics
Player	Team	Stat	Tot	Player	Team	Stat	Tot
Tom Gott	Quincy	BA	.348	Stan Pitula	Keokuk	W	20
Ed Barbarito	Quincy	Runs	121	Stan Pitula	Keokuk	SO	172
Tom Gott	Quincy	Hits	168	Ray Rippelmeyer	Evansville	ERA	2.91
Bob Kosis	Peoria	RBI	121	Ray Rippelmeyer	Evansville	PCT	.762 16–5
Ed Barbarito	Quincy	HR	35				

1955 Illinois–Indiana–Iowa League
schedule

Team standings	W	L	PCT	GB	Attend	Managers
Keokuk Kernels	92	34	.730	—	39,179	Pinky May
Waterloo White Hawks	70	56	.556	22	71,864	Dutch Dorman / Willard Marshall
Peoria Chiefs	63	63	.500	29	62,347	Whitey Kurowski
Burlington Bees	62	64	.492	30	91,946	Harold Meek
Evansville Braves	60	66	.476	32	47,414	Bob Coleman
Terre Haute Huts	56	70	.444	36	50,334	Stubby Overmire
Quincy Gems	52	74	.413	40	39,081	Vern Hoscheit
Cedar Rapids Raiders	49	77	.389	43	58,611	Ray Perry

Playoffs: Keokuk 3 games, Peoria 0; Burlington 3 games, Waterloo 1.
Finals: Keokuk 3 games, Burlington 1.

Player statistics
Player	Team	Stat	Tot	Player	Team	Stat	Tot
Russ Nixon	Keokuk	BA	.385	Mudcat Grant	Keokuk	W	19
John Romano	Waterloo	Runs	108	Bob Yanen	Keokuk	SO	177
Tony Kubek	Quincy	Hits	157	Bill Dailey	Keokuk	ERA	2.52
John Romano	Waterloo	RBI	124	Mudcat Grant	Keokuk	PCT	.864 19–3
John Romano	Waterloo	HR	38				

1956 Illinois–Indiana–Iowa League
schedule

Team standings	W	L	PCT	GB	Attend	Managers
Evansville Braves	84	36	.700	—	60,910	Bob Coleman
Waterloo White Hawks	62	56	.525	21	46,119	Ira Hutchinson
Keokuk Kernels	60	59	.504	23½	47,440	Pinky May
Peoria Chiefs	58	58	.500	24	54,359	George Kissell
Quincy Gems	56	64	.467	28	35,308	Vern Hoscheit
Burlington Bees	46	75	.380	38½	68,260	Ed McDade
Cedar Rapids Raiders	44	76	.367	40	47,352	George Scherger
Terre Haute Huts	40	26	.606	NA	23,368	Bill Norman / Charlie Metro

Terre Haute disbanded July 3.
Playoffs: None Scheduled

Player statistics
Player	Team	Stat	Tot	Player	Team	Stat	Tot
Horace Garner	Evansville	BA	.354	Don Nottebart	Evansville	W	18
Lee Maye	Evansville	Runs	103	Dave Wegereck	Keokuk	SO	158
Lee Maye	Evansville	Hits	159	Don Nottebart	Evansville	ERA	2.24
Lee Maye	Evansville	RBI	99	Don Nottebart	Evansville	PCT	.857 18–3
Clyde McNeal	Cedar Rapids	HR	27				

1957 Illinois–Indiana–Iowa League
schedule

Team standings	W	L	PCT	GB	Attend	Managers
Evansville Braves	81	49	.623	—	54,295	Bob Coleman
Peoria Chiefs	80	49	.620	½	54,737	Vern Hoscheit
Davenport DavSox	65	65	.500	16	79,478	Skeeter Scalzi
Burlington Bees	57	71	.445	23	58,771	Ken Raffensberger
Keokuk Kernels	55	74	.426	25½	35,028	Pinky May
Cedar Rapids Raiders	49	79	.383	31	54,717	Danny Ozark

Playoffs: None Scheduled

Player statistics
Player	Team	Stat	Tot	Player	Team	Stat	Tot
Horace Garner	Evansville	BA	.334	Don Nichols	Peoria	W	20
Billy Smith	Evansville	Runs	107	Hal Trosky Jr.	Davenport	SO	204
George Holder	Evansville	Hits	148	Don Nichols	Peoria	ERA	2.09
Horace Garner	Evansville	RBI	100	Don Nichols	Peoria	PCT	.870 20–3
Jim Koranda	Cedar Rapids	HR	31				

1958 Illinois–Indiana–Iowa League – schedule

Team standings	W	L	PCT	GB	Attend	Managers
Cedar Rapids Braves	77	53	.592	—	81,437	Alex Monchak
Davenport DavSox	71	58	.550	5½	61,522	Ira Hutchinson
Green Bay Bluejays	65	64	.504	11½	63,782	Pete Reiser
Burlington Bees	62	67	.481	14½	51,632	Walt Dixon
Rochester A's / Winona A's	57	73	.438	20	39,589	Burl Storie / Lew Krausse Sr.
Fox Cities Foxes	56	73	.434	20½	58,602	Pete Suder

Rochester (20–37) moved to Winona June 29.
Playoff: Cedar Rapids 3 games, Davenport 2.

Player statistics
Player	Team	Stat	Tot	Player	Team	Stat	Tot
Carlos Pascual	Fox Cities	BA	.372	Bill Hamilton	Cedar Rapids	W	15
Frank Howard	Green Bay	Runs	104	Ed Rakow	Green Bay	W	15
Bob Sager	Davenport	Hits	180	Robert Sedlak	Green Bay	W	15
Frank Howard	Green Bay	RBI	119	Stan Horvatin	Roches/Winona	SO	210
Frank Howard	Green Bay	HR	37	Bill Hamilton	Cedar Rapids	ERA	2.18
				Bob Hendley	Cedar Rapids	PCT	.737 14–5

1959 Illinois–Indiana–Iowa League
schedule

Team standings	W	L	PCT	GB	Attend	Managers
Des Moines Demons	78	48	.619	—	86,923	Chuck Kress
Green Bay Bluejays	74	51	.592	3½	41,107	Stan Wasiak
Topeka Hawks	69	56	.552	8½	59,803	Johnny Vander Meer
Fox Cities Foxes	59	67	.468	19	51,004	Jack McKeon
Lincoln Chiefs	58	68	.460	20	44,783	Ira Hutchinson
Sioux City Soos	58	68	.460	20	38,332	Bill Capps
Burlington Bees	54	72	.429	24	53,536	Ray Mueller
Cedar Rapids Braves	53	73	.421	25	70,039	Alex Monchak

Playoff: Green Bay 3 games, Des Moines 1.

Player statistics
Player	Team	Stat	Tot	Player	Team	Stat	Tot
Hernan Valdes	Fox Cities	BA	.330	Bart Dziadek	Topeka	W	15
Cal Emery	Des Moines	Runs	107	Larry Maxie	Cedar Rapids	SO	187
Dick Howser	Sioux City	Runs	107	Jim Brewer	Burlington	ERA	2.67
George Scott	Green Bay	Hits	155	Andrés Ayón	Topeka	PCT	.750 12–4
Cal Emery	Des Moines	RBI	129				
Cal Emery	Green Bay	HR	27				

1960 Illinois–Indiana–Iowa League
schedule

Team standings	W	L	PCT	GB	Attend	Managers
Fox Cities Foxes	82	56	.594	—	61,062	Earl Weaver
Lincoln Chiefs	71	66	.518	10½	45,170	Ira Hutchinson
Sioux City Soos	71	68	.511	11½	41,385	Bobby Hofman
Cedar Rapids Braves	71	69	.507	12	62,358	Jimmy Brown
Burlington Bees	66	74	.471	17	51,988	Hardy Peterson
Green Bay Dodgers	65	73	.471	17	29,940	Stan Wasiak
Des Moines Demons	64	74	.464	18	53,828	Andy Seminick
Topeka Reds	64	74	.464	18	36,365	Johnny Vander Meer

Playoff: None Scheduled

Player statistics
Player	Team	Stat	Tot	Player	Team	Stat	Tot
Pete Ward	Fox Cities	BA	.345	Ron Woods	Lincoln	W	17
Frank Montgomery	Fox Cities	Runs	111	Hank Fischer	Cedar Rapids	SO	217
Gerry Reimer	Des Moines	Hits	179	Hank Fischer	Grand Rapids	ERA	2.01
Billy Joe Dashner	Topeka	RBI	108	Hank Fischer	Grand Rapids	PCT	.682 15–7
Manly Johnston	Lincoln	HR	23				
Billy Joe Dashner	Topeka	HR	23				

1961 Illinois–Indiana–Iowa League
schedule

Team standings	W	L	PCT	GB	Attend	Managers
Topeka Reds	79	50	.612	—	56,384	Dave Bristol
Cedar Rapids Braves	73	57	.562	6½	69,617	Jimmy Brown
Lincoln Chiefs	68	62	.523	11½	42,866	George Noga
Fox Cities Foxes	67	62	.519	12	47,552	Earl Weaver
Burlington Bees	65	65	.500	14½	36,798	Hardy Peterson
Des Moines Demons	37	93	.285	42½	33,337	Chuck Kress

Playoff: None Scheduled

Player statistics
Player	Team	Stat	Tot	Player	Team	Stat	Tot
Dick Haines	Des Moines	BA	.355	Bill Holmes	Cedar Rapids	W	18
Tommy Harper	Topeka	Runs	131	Bob Locker	Lincoln	SO	215
Paul Snyder	Cedar Rapids	Hits	153	Bill Holmes	Cedar Rapids	ERA	2.21
Miles McWilliams	Topeka	RBI	102	Bill Holmes	Cedar Rapids	PCT	.818 18–4
Barry Morgan	Cedar Rapids	HR	23				

== Baseball Hall of Fame alumni ==
- Luis Aparicio, 1954 Waterloo White Hawks
- Lou Boudreau, 1938 Cedar Rapids Raiders
- Mordecai Brown, 1901 Terre Haute Hottentots; 1919–1920 Terre Haute Browns
- Jim Bunning, 1951 Davenport Tigers
- Red Faber, 1909–1910 Dubuque Dubs
- Warren Giles, 1920–1921 Moline Plowboys
- Hank Greenberg, 1931 Evansville Hubs
- Burleigh Grimes, 1935 Bloomington Bloomers
- Whitey Herzog, 1952 Quincy Gems
- Carl Hubbell, 1927 Decatur Commodores
- Chuck Klein, 1927 Evansville Hubs
- Tony Lazzeri, 1923 Peoria Tractors
- Joe McGinnity, 1922 Danville Veterans
- Red Ruffing, 1923 Danville Veterans
- Warren Spahn, 1941 Evansville Bees
- Earl Weaver, 1960–1961 Fox Cities Foxes
- Billy Williams, 1958 Burlington Bees
- also: Milo Hamilton, 1950–1951 Davenport Tigers Announcer, Ford C. Frick Award
- Tony Kubek, 1955 Quincy Gems, Ford C. Frick Award
- Bob Uecker, 1957, Evansville Braves, Ford C. Frick Award

== Three-I Most Valuable Players ==
- 1961 Tommy Harper, Topeka Reds
- 1960 Pete Ward, Fox Cities Foxes
- 1959 Cal Emery Des Moines Demons
- 1958 Frank Howard, Green Bay Bluejays
- 1957 Don Nichols, Peoria Chiefs
- 1956 Don Nottebart, Evansville Braves
- 1955 Johnny Romano, Waterloo White Hawks
