= Davenport Cubs =

- 1946–1947; (1946–1952, 1957–1958); Davenport, Iowa

Minor league affiliations
- Class: Class B (1946–1952, 1957–1958)
- League: Illinois–Indiana–Iowa League (1946–1952, 1957–1958)

Major league affiliations
- Team: Chicago White Sox (1957–1958); Detroit Tigers (1951–1952); Pittsburgh Pirates (1948–1949); Chicago Cubs (1946–1947)

Minor league titles
- League titles (1): 1949
- Conference titles (1): 1946
- Wild card berths (1): 1958

Team data
- Name: Davenport DavSox (1957–1958); Davenport Tigers (1951–1952); Davenport Quads (1950); Davenport Pirates (1948–1949); Davenport Cubs (1946–1947)
- Ballpark: Municipal Stadium (1946–1952, 1957–1958)

The Davenport Cubs were a minor league baseball team based in Davenport, Iowa. In 1946, the "Cubs" began play as members of the Class B level Illinois–Indiana–Iowa League, continuing the tenure of Davenport teams in the league. The Cubs were a minor league affiliate of the Chicago Cubs and played through 1947. The Davenport "Pirates" (Pittsburgh Pirates), Davenport "Quads," Davenport "Tigers" (Detroit Tigers) and Davenport "DavSox" (Chicago White Sox) teams completed Davenport's membership in the Illinois–Indiana–Iowa League through 1957.

Davenport won the 1946 league pennant and 1949 league championship. The Davenport Braves team resumed play beginning in 1960, as Davenport joined the Midwest League.

The Davenport teams hosted Illinois–Indiana–Iowa League home minor league games at Municipal Stadium, known today as Modern Woodmen Park.

Baseball Hall of Fame member Jim Bunning played for the 1949 Davenport Tigers at age 19.

== History ==
=== Davenport Cubs 1946 & 1947 ===
Minor league baseball began in Davenport, Iowa in 1879, when the Davenport Brown Stockings played the season as charter members of the four-team independent Northwestern League. The Davenport team began Illinois–Indiana–Iowa League play in 1901, when the Davenport River Rats were charter member of the league. The 1937 Davenport Blue Sox, who played the season as members of the Western League were the team immediately preceding the Davenport Cubs in minor league play.

In September 1945, businessman Paul Lagomarcino represented Davenport at a league meeting to reorganize the Illinois–Indiana–Iowa League, as it was one of many minor leagues that were reforming after the conclusion the end of World War II. When Madison, Wisconsin failed to renew their Madison Blues franchise, Davenport was approved to join the league.

In 1946, the newly formed Davenport "Cubs" resumed minor league play as members of the reformed Class B level Illinois–Indiana–Iowa League. The Danville Dodgers, Evansville Braves, Decatur Commodores, Quincy Gems, Springfield Browns, Terre Haute Phillies and Waterloo White Hawks teams joined Davenport in league play.

In their first season, the Davenport Cubs won the league pennant. The Cubs ended the Illinois–Indiana–Iowa League regular season tied for first with the Danville Dodges. The Cubs ended the season with an identical record to Danville, at 76–44, playing the season under manager Bill Kelly. Danville and Davenport ended the regular season 7.5 games ahead of the third place Evansville Braves. Cubs player Rube Walker won the league batting title, hitting .354, while teammate Jean Davison led league pitchers with both a 2.28 ERA and 13–2 record.

After the Illinois–Indiana–Iowa League regular season ended in a tie between Danville and Davenport, a one game playoff was held at Davenport to decide the pennant winner. With the score tied at 2–2 in the bottom on the 9th inning, Davenport first basemen Paul Swoboda hit a 2-run home run to win the pennant for Davenport.

In the four-team playoffs that followed, the Cubs lost in the first round to eventual champion Evansville 3 games to 1. After leading Davenport to the 1946 pennant, Bill Kelly began a tenure as manager of the Los Angeles Angels of the Pacific Coast League in 1947.

In the 1947 Illinois–Indiana–Iowa League, Davenport placed sixth in the final regular season standings, and did not qualify for the playoffs. The Cubs ended the season with a record of 55–70 and were managed by Morrie Arnovich and Dickey Kerr. Davenport finished 23.5 games behind the first place Danville Dodgers. Waterloo was the league champion.

=== Davenport Pirates 1948 & 1949 league championship ===
Davenport became a minor league affiliate of the Pittsburgh Pirates in 1948 and continued Illinois–Indiana–Iowa League play.

Continuing Illinois–Indiana–Iowa League play under a new nickname, the 1948 Davenport "Pirates" ended the season in last place in the eight-team league. The Pirates ended the season with a 41–85 record, playing the season under manager Ival Goodman. The Pirates finished 40.0 games behind the first place Quincy Gems in the final regular season standings. Davenport did not qualify for the playoffs, won by the Evansville Braves

Rebounding from a last place finish in the previous season, the 1949 Davenport Pirates won the Class B level Illinois–Indiana–Iowa League championship. Davenport ended the regular season in fourth place with a record of 67–59, qualifying for the playoffs in finishing 7.5 games behind the first place Evansville Braves. Bill Burwell served as manager. In the first round of playoffs, Davenport defeated the Waterloo White Hawks 3 games to 2 and advanced. In the final, Davenport won the league championship in sweeping Evansville in 3 games.

In 1949, the franchise hired William "Perk" Purnhage, a veteran minor league executive and promoter to become general manager of the Pirates and target increased attendance. The result was on field success and record attendance for the season. Boosted by a championship team, the Davenport Pirates drew a record 133,530 fans for the 1949 season, up from 45,711 in 1948.

=== Davenport Quads 1950 ===
Davenport was unaffiliated in 1950 and continued Class B level Illinois–Indiana–Iowa League membership, playing the season as the Davenport "Quads." As the only unaffiliated team in the eight-team league, Davenport ended the season in last place.

In the 1950 Illinois–Indiana–Iowa League final standings, the Quads ended the season with a record of 49–75 and placed eighth, missing the playoffs. Gene Hasson was the player/manager for Davenport. In the eight-team league, Davenport ended the season 28.0 games behind the first place and eventual champion Terre Haute Phillies in the final regular season standings.

=== Davenport Tigers 1951 & 1952 ===
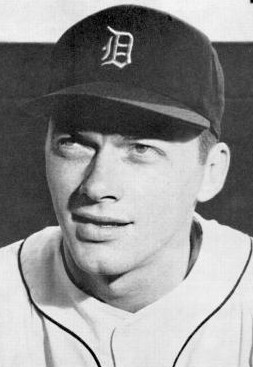
(1959) Jim Bunning - Detroit Tigers. Bunning played for Davenport in 1951. Bunning was elected to the Baseball Hall of Fame in 1996.

Davenport continued Class B level Illinois–Indiana–Iowa League play in 1951 as an affiliate of the Detroit Tigers with a future Baseball Hall of Fame player on the roster. As the league reduced to six teams, the Davenport "Tigers" ended the season in last place and did not qualify for the four-team playoffs. Managed during the season by Marv Olson, the Tigers ended the season with a record of 56–74. Davenport finished 19.0 games behind the first place Terre Haute Phillies in the final regular season standings. In the playoffs, the Quincy Gems won the league championship. Davenport had home season attendance of 100,328 and Robert Erps of Davenport led the league with 97 RBI. During the 1951 season, the team did local marketing celebrating 50 years since beginning Illinois–Indiana–Iowa League play in 1901 and promoted the team using the "Quad City Tigers" nickname.

Baseball Hall of Fame member Jim Bunning pitched for the 1951 Davenport Tigers at age 19. In his second season of professional play, Bunning had an 8–10 record with a 2.88 ERA.

In the 1952 Illinois–Indiana–Iowa League, the Class B league again expanded to resume play as an eight-team league, adding the Keokuk Kernels and Burlington Flints teams. Davenport continued play and ended the season in sixth place, finishing the season with a 54–69 record. Marv Owen served as manager, as Davenport ended the season 21.0 gamed behind the first place Evansville Braves.

Baseball Hall of Fame announcer Milo Hamilton announced Davenport Tigers' games on local radio for KSTT. Harvey Kuenn hit .340 for Davenport in 1952 and was called up to the Detroit Tigers after the Davenport season ended. Kuenn had been signed by the Detroit Tigers and received a $55,000 bonus before reporting to Davenport to begin his professional career, which included an 18-game hitting streak in 1952. Kuenn won the 1953 Major League Baseball Rookie of the Year Award.

After the 1952 season, the Davenport franchise did not return to the 1953 Illinois–Indiana–Iowa League, replaced in league play by the Peoria Chiefs franchise. Davenport did not field a minor league team until resuming Illinois–Indiana–Iowa League membership in 1957.

=== Davenport DavSox 1957 & 1958 ===
After losing their minor league team for four seasons, minor league play returned to Davenport in 1956, as the Davenport "DavSox" resumed play in the six-team Class B level Illinois–Indiana–Iowa League as a minor league affiliate of the Chicago White Sox. The DavSox ended the season in third place in their return to the league. With a final record of 65–65, Davenport was managed by Skeeter Scalzi, finishing 16.0 games behind the first place Evansville Braves who won the championship as no playoffs were held. Pitcher Hal Trosky Jr. of Davenport led the league with 204 strikeouts.

In their final season, the Davenport DavSox ended the 1958 Illinois–Indiana–Iowa League season in second place in the six-team league before losing in a playoff final. The DavSox ended the season with a 71–58 record, as Ira Hutchinson served as manager. Davenport finished 5.5 games behind the first place Cedar Rapids Braves in the regular season and Standings. Davenport and Cedar Rapids then met in a playoff for the championship. Davenport lost in the playoff, losing 3 games to 2 to the Braves in their final games.

After the 1958 season, the Davenport franchise was relocated by the Illinois–Indiana–Iowa League and became the Lincoln Chiefs, managed by Ira Hutchinson.

Davenport remained without a minor league team until the 1960 Davenport Braves began play as members of the Midwest League. Between 1901 and 1958, Davenport teams played 23 seasons as members of the Illinois–Indiana–Iowa League. Today, Davenport continues to host minor league play as home to the Quad Cities River Bandits of the Class A level Midwest League.

== The ballpark ==
The Davenport Cubs and the subsequent Illinois–Indiana–Iowa League teams hosted home minor league games at Municipal Stadium. The ballpark is still in use today and was constructed in 1931. The ballpark is located at 209 South Gaines Street and today is renamed to Modern Woodmen Park, hosting the Quad Cities River Bandits.

== Timeline ==
Year(s)	# Yrs.	Team	Level	League	Affiliate	Ballpark
1946–1947	2	Davenport Cubs	Class B	Illinois–Indiana–Iowa League	Chicago Cubs	Municipal Stadium
1948–1949	2	Davenport Pirates	Class B	Illinois–Indiana–Iowa League	Pittsburgh Pirates	Municipal Stadium
1950	1	Davenport Quads	Class B	Illinois–Indiana–Iowa League	None	Municipal Stadium
1951–1952	2	Davenport Tigers	Class B	Illinois–Indiana–Iowa League	Detroit Tigers	Municipal Stadium
1957–1958	2	Davenport DavSox	Class B	Illinois–Indiana–Iowa League	Chicago White Sox	Municipal Stadium

== Year–by–year records ==
Year	Record	Finish	Manager	Playoffs/notes
1946	76–44	1st	Bill Kelly	Won league pennant Lost in 1st round
1947	55–70	6th	Morrie Arnovich / Dickey Kerr	Did not qualify
1948	41–58	8th	Ival Goodman	Did not qualify
1949	67–59	4th	Bill Burwell	League champions
1950	49–75	8th	Gene Hasson	Did not qualify
1951	56–74	6th	Marv Olson	Did not qualify
1952	54–56	6th	Marv Owen	No playoffs held
1957	65–65	3rd	Skeeter Scalzi	No playoffs held
1958	71–58	2nd	Ira Hutchinson	Lost in finals

== Notable alumni ==
- Jim Bunning (1951) Elected Baseball Hall of Fame, 1996
- Fritz Ackley (1957)
- Morrie Arnovich (1947, MGR) MLB All-Star
- Alan Brice (1958)
- Nelson Burbrink (1946)
- Bill Burwell (1949, MGR)
- Jack Brittin (1947)
- Nelson Burbrink (1946)
- Lee Eilbracht (1946)
- Vern Fear (1947)
- John Fiscalini (1948)
- Harry Fisher (1948)
- Bob Garber (1949)
- Tommy Giordano (1948)
- Ival Goodman (1948, MGR) 2x MLB All-Star
- Al Grunwald (1949)
- Gene Hasson (1950, MGR)
- Joe Hoerner (1958) MLB All-Star
- Cal Hogue (1949)
- Ira Hutchinson (1958, MGR)
- Tony Jacobs (1946)
- Stan Johnson (1957)
- Bill Kelly (1946, MGR)
- Dickey Kerr (1947, MGR)
- Jack Kralick (1957-1958) MLB All-Star
- Harvey Kuenn (1952) 10x MLB All-Star
- Vern Law (1949) 1960 Cy Young Award
- Chuck Lindstrom (1958)
- J.C Martin (1957)
- Jim McAnany (1957)
- Stover McIlwain (1957-1958)
- Carmen Mauro (1946)
- Don Mincher (1958) 2x MLB All-Star
- Marv Olson (1951, MGR)
- Marv Owen (1952, MGR)
- Gary Peters (1958) 2x MLB All-Star
- Bob Purkey (1949) Cincinnati Reds Hall of Fame
- Skeeter Scalzi (1957, MGR)
- Lou Sleater (1947)
- Roy Smalley Jr. (1946)
- Frank Thomas (1949) 3x MLB All-Star
- Bill Tuttle (1951-1952)
- Hal Trosky Jr. (1957)
- Rube Walker (1946)

== See also ==
- Davenport Cubs players
- Davenport Pirates players
- Davenport Tigers players
- Davenport DavSox players
