= Davenport River Rats =

- 1901–1904; (1901–1906, 1909–1912); Davenport, Iowa

Minor league affiliations
- Class: Class D (1901); Class B (1902–1906, 1909–1912)
- League: Illinois–Indiana–Iowa League (1901–1906, 1909–1912)

Major league affiliations
- Team: None

Minor league titles
- League titles (0): None

Team data
- Name: Davenport River Rats (1901–1904); Davenport Riversides (1905); Davenport Knickerbockers (1906); Davenport Prodigals (1909–1912)
- Ballpark: Davenport Ball Park (1901–1906); Blue Sox Park (1909–1912)

The Davenport River Rats were a minor league baseball team based in Davenport, Iowa. In 1901, the "River Rats" became charter members of the Class D level Illinois–Indiana–Iowa League, beginning a long tenure of Davenport teams in the league. The Illinois–Indiana–Iowa League became a Class B level league in 1902 and the River Rats continued league play through 1904, with the Davenport "Riversides," Davenport "Knickerbockers" and Davenport "Prodigals" teams extending Davenport's membership in the Illinois–Indiana–Iowa League through 1912. Beginning in 1913, the Davenport Blue Sox began their tenure of Illinois–Indiana–Iowa League play.

The Davenport teams hosted minor league home games at the Davenport Base Ball Park through 1906 and at the Blue Sox Park ballpark site beginning in 1909.

== History ==
=== Davenport River Rats 1901 to 1904 ===
Minor league baseball began in Davenport, Iowa in 1879, when the Davenport Brown Stockings played the season as charter members of the four-team independent Northwestern League. The Davenport River Rats were immediately preceded in minor league play by the 1891 Davenport Pilgrims, who played the season played as members of the Illinois-Iowa League.

On January 30, 1901, a meeting was held in Peoria, Illinois to form a new minor league. Local businessman Max Ochs represented Davenport at the meeting, where a new league was formed with a Davenport franchise included.

In 1901, the newly formed Davenport "River Rats" became charter members of the Illinois–Indiana–Iowa League, which also included a team in neighboring Rock Island, Illinois. The league was founded as a Class D level league, with Rock Island, native Michael H. Sexton serving as the league president. The Bloomington Blues, Cedar Rapids Rabbitts, Decatur Commodores, Evansville River Rats, Rock Island Islanders, Rockford Red Sox and Terre Haute Hottentots teams joined Davenport as the league's charter teams. The Bloomington, Decatur and Terre Haute teams joined the new league from the Central League and merged with new franchises in Cedar Rapids, Davenport, Evansville, Rockford and Rock Island to form the league, nicknamed the "Three I League."

The new River Rats baseball franchise was organized and run by J.T Hayes.

Davenport's "River Rats" nickname corresponds with the city location along the Mississippi River, where it lies directly across from Rock Island, Illinois.

In their first season of play in the Illinois–Indiana–Iowa League, Davenport placed fifth in the final standings, as the league held no playoffs. The River Rats ended the season with a record of 51–61 and were managed by Billy Smith. Davenport finished 9.5 games behind the first place Terre Haute Hottentots. Davenport manager Billy Smith had a long career as a minor league manager and compiled a career record of 1772–1692 in managing numerous teams between 1895 and 1922.

In its second season, the 1902 Illinois–Indiana–Iowa League became classified as a Class B level league, a classification it retained for the next 59 seasons of league operation. League president Michael Sexton led efforts to form the National Association among minor league owners, which was created at meetings in Chicago, Illinois. The National Association would grow from 15 member leagues in 1902 to 52 leagues in 1910 and a created common roster, salary, classification and development practices among baseball's minor leagues.

In their second season of Illinois–Indiana–Iowa League play, the Davenport River Rats finished in fifth place in the eight-team league. The River Rats ended the season with a 59–63 record, playing the season under manager Jim Hayes, who began a multi-year tenure as manager. The River Rats finished 13.0 games behind the first place Rockford Red Sox in the final standings. River Rat pitcher John McCord led the Illinois–Indiana–Iowa League with 239 strikeouts.

The 1903 River Rats ended the Illinois–Indiana–Iowa League season in third place. Davenport ended the season with a record of 65–53, finishing 6.5 games behind the first place Bloomington Bloomers, as Jim Hayes returned as manager. Davenport's Dutch Hines won the Illinois–Indiana–Iowa League batting championship, batting .339 for the season.

In 1904, Jim Hayes managed his third season with Davenport. In the Class B level Illinois–Indiana–Iowa League final standings, the River Rats ended the season with a record of 52–69 and placed seventh. In the eight-team league, Davenport ended the season 20.5 games behind the first place Springfield Hustlers in the final standings.

=== Riversides 1905 / Knickerbockers 1906 ===
Davenport continued Illinois–Indiana–Iowa League play in 1905 under a new nickname. The Davenport "Riversides" ended the season in seventh place. Managed during the season by Jim Hayes, Dal Williams and Edward Webster, the Riversides ended the season with a record of 56–67. Davenport finished 14.0 games behind the champion Dubuque Shamrocks in the final standings.

In the 1906 Illinois–Indiana–Iowa League, Davenport continued play as members of the Class B league and were again known by another nickname. The Davenport "Knickerbockers" finished in last place in the final standings. The Knickerbockers ended the season with a 45–74 record to finish in eighth place. Albert Kennedy and Peter Burg served as managers, as Davenport ended the season 32.5 gamed behind the first place Cedar Rapids Rabbitts.

After their last place finish, the Davenport franchise did not return to the 1907 Illinois–Indiana–Iowa League, replaced in league play by the Clinton Infants franchise. Davenport also did not field a minor league team in 1908.

=== Davenport Prodigals 1909 to 1912 ===
After losing their minor league team, Davenport baseball supporters, led by J.T. Hayes led efforts to regain the Davenport franchise that was lost to Clinton. A new ballpark was built on a site in West Davenport on donated land to improve the ballpark situation. The new ballpark was at the end of the trolly line at Second Street and Telegraph Road. Davenport was successful in regaining a league franchise from Clinton, rejoining the 1909 Illinois–Indiana–Iowa League.

Minor league play returned to Davenport in 1909, as the Davenport "Prodigals" resumed play in the Class B level Illinois–Indiana–Iowa League. After having been replaced by Clinton two years earlier, Davenport replaced the Clinton Adults team in the eight-team league. The Prodigals ended the season in third place in their return to the league. With a final record of 77–59, Davenport was managed by Charlie Shaffer, finishing 12.0 games behind the first place Rock Island Islanders, who finished with a 90–48 record.

The Prodigals continued play and finished in seventh place in the 1910 Illinois–Indiana–Iowa League. With Charlie Shaffer returning as manager, Davenport ended the season with a 59–80 record, finishing 31.0 games behind the first place Springfield Senators team.

In 1911, Dan O'Leary began a tenure as the Davenport manager, as the Prodigals continued play as members of the Class B level Illinois–Indiana–Iowa League. With a record of 69–69, Davenport ended the season in fifth place, finishing 9.5 games behind the first place Peoria Distillers. Davenport's Alfred Bromwith led the Illinois–Indiana–Iowa League with 159 total hits.

In their final season, the Davenport Prodigals ended the 1912 Illinois–Indiana–Iowa League season in second place in the eight-team league. The Prodigals ended the season with a 75–60 record, as Dan O'Leary continued as manager. Davenport finished 15.5 games behind the first place Springfield Senators, who compiled a 90–45 record in winning the championship ahead of runner up Davenport. John Middleton of Davenport led the league with a 1.24 ERA.

For the 1913 season, Davenport continued Illinois–Indiana–Iowa League play under a new nickname. The Davenport "Prodigals" were renamed to become the Davenport Blue Sox, who continued play in the league under manager Dan O'Leary. Between 1901 and 1958, Davenport teams played 23 seasons as members of the Illinois–Indiana–Iowa League. Today, Davenport continues to host minor league play as home to the Quad Cities River Bandits of the Class A level Midwest League.

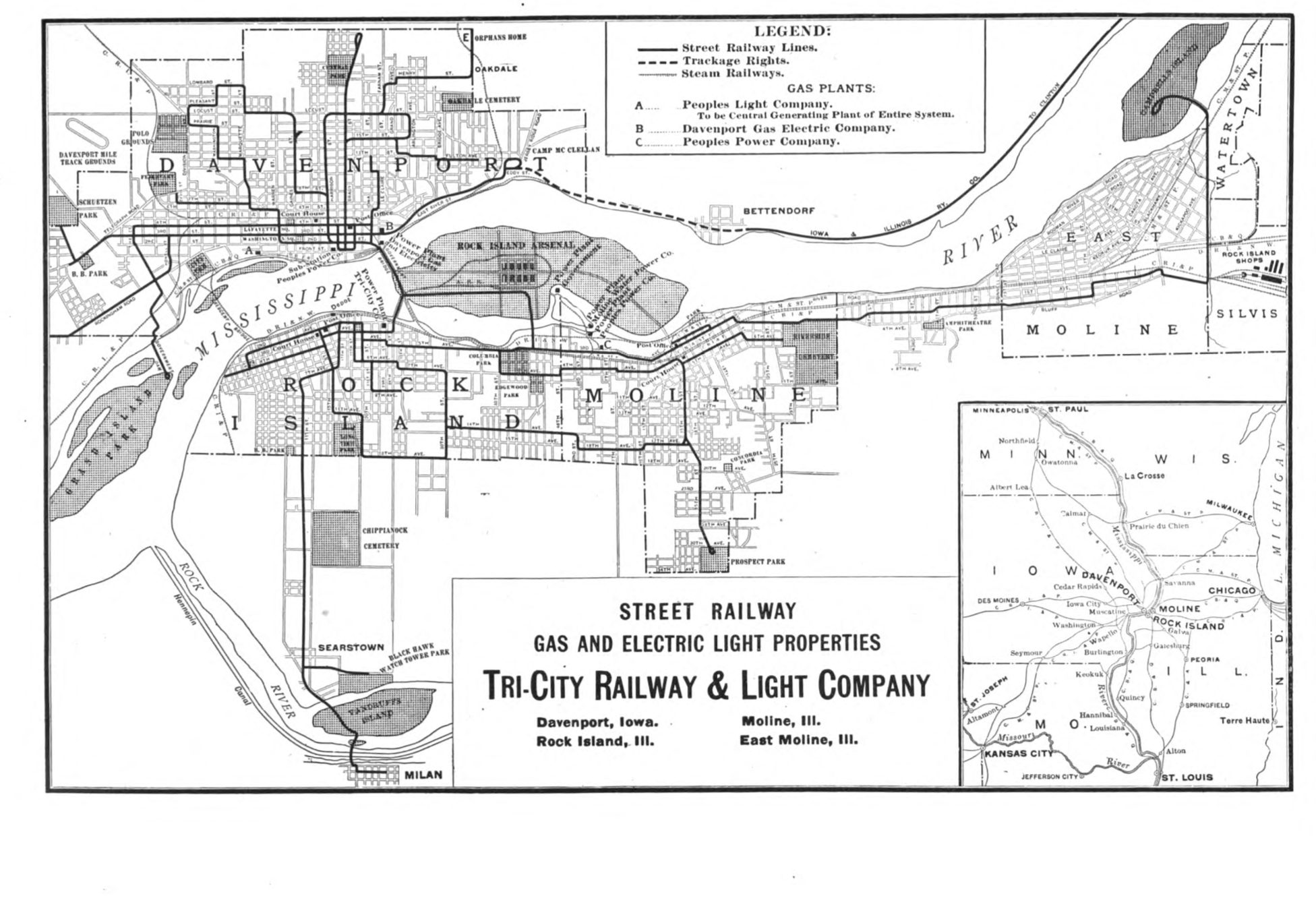
(1907) Map of Tri-City Railway and Light Company, Davenport, Iowa; Rock Island, Illinois; Moline, Illinois and East Moline, Illinois. The ballpark is labeled "B.B. Park" in the upper left of the map

== The ballparks ==
The Davenport Illinois–Indiana–Iowa League teams hosted home minor league games at the Davenport Ball Park through 1906. The ballpark was built in time for the 1901 season, as community leaders sought to upgrade baseball facilities in order to support a minor league team. The ballpark site was located at Bowditch Street & Second Street in Davenport, Iowa.

After losing their Davenport franchise following the 1906 season, local leaders built a new ballpark to support a return to minor league playin the Illinois–Indiana–Iowa League and reclaim their lost franchise from Clinton. The new ballpark was built on a lot donated by W.P. McManus in West Davenport and opened when the Davenport Prodigals returned to Illinois-Indiana-Iowa League play in 1909. The ballpark was located at the end of the Third Street trolly line at Telegraph Road in Davenport. The ballpark became known as "Blue Sox Park" and hosted the Davenport minor league teams through 1916.

== Timeline ==
Year(s)	# Yrs.	Team	Level	League	Ballpark
1901	1	Davenport River Rats	Class D	Illinois–Indiana–Iowa League	Davenport Ball Park
1902–1904	3	Davenport River Rats	Class B	Illinois–Indiana–Iowa League	Davenport Ball Park
1905	1	Davenport Riversides	Class B	Illinois–Indiana–Iowa League	Davenport Ball Park
1906	1	Davenport Knickerbockers	Class B	Illinois–Indiana–Iowa League	Davenport Ball Park
1909–1912	4	Davenport Prodigals	Class B	Illinois–Indiana–Iowa League	Blue Sox Park

== Year–by–year records ==
Year	Record	Finish	Manager	Playoffs/notes
1901	51–61	5th	Billy Smith	No playoffs held
1902	59–63	5th	Jim Hayes	No playoffs held
1903	65–53	3rd	Jim Hayes	No playoffs held
1904	52–69	7th	Jim Hayes	No playoffs held
1905	56–67	7th	Jim Hayes / Dal Williams; Edward Webster	No playoffs held
1906	45–74	8th	Albert Kennedy / Peter Burg	No playoffs held
1909	77–59	3rd	Charlie Shaffer	No playoffs held
1910	59–80	7th	Charlie Shaffer	No playoffs held
1911	69–69	5th	Dan O'Leary	No playoffs held
1912	75–60	2nd	Dan O'Leary	No playoffs held

== Notable alumni ==
- Whitey Alperman (1901)
- Jim Breton (1912)
- Ray Chapman (1912) Cleveland Guardians Hall of Fame
- Bob Clemens (1912)
- Bob Coleman (1912)
- Jack Coveney (1912)
- Davey Crockett (1901, 1906)
- Roy Crabb (1912)
- Frank Figgemeier (1901)
- Frank Foutz (1912)
- John Goodwin (1912)
- Ed Hilley (1912)
- Hunkey Hines (1901)
- Mike Jacobs (1901)
- Charlie Jaeger (1912)
- Pete Lister (1912)
- Ted McGrew (1912)
- Billy Kinloch (1901)
- George Moriarty (1901)
- Rabbit Nill (1901)
- Champ Osteen (1901)
- Ed Pinnance (1912)
- Milt Reed (1912)
- Owen Shannon (1901)
- Walt Slagle (1901)
- Huck Wallace (1901)
- Bill Lelivelt (1905-1906)

== See also ==
- Davenport River Rats players
- Davenport Riversides players
- Davenport Knickerbockers players
- Davenport Prodigals players
