= Terre Haute Tots =

Minor league baseball team in Terre Haute, Indiana, United States (1921–1937)

The Terre Haute Tots were a baseball team in Terre Haute, Indiana from 1921–1937 after being established in 1919 as the Terre Haute Browns. They were a Three-I League team; while they were unaffiliated for most of their existence, in 1937, they were affiliated with the St. Louis Browns.

== The ballpark ==
The Tots' games were played at Memorial Stadium ballpark in Terre Haute.

== Notable alumni ==
- Mordecai Brown (1919–20) Inducted Baseball Hall of Fame, 1949
- Watty Clark (1926)
- Bob Coleman (1922)
- Wes Ferrell (1928) 2 x MLB All-Star; Most Career HR by a pitcher (37)
- Walter Holke (1932, 1937)
- George Hale (1925)
- Bob Kahle
- Elmer Klumpp
- Roxie Lawson (1930)
- Walt Meinert
- Bill Mizeur (1924–1926)
- Dink O'Brien (1924)
- Charlie Root (1921–1922) 1927 NL Wins Leader
- Art Reinholz
- Oscar Siemer (1932)
- Carr Smith (1927)
- Fred Tauby (1926)
- Dizzy Trout (1935) 2 x MLB All Star; 1943 AL Wins Leader; 1944 AL ERA Leader
- Bill Trotter
- Phil Weintraub (1932)
- Jerry Witte (1937)
- Earl Wolgamot

== Year-by-year records ==
| Year | Record | Finish | Manager | Playoffs |
|---|---|---|---|---|
| 1937 | 15-38 | --- | Bill Burwell | Team disbanded in mid-season |
| 1935 | 57-61 | 4th | Bill Burwell | No playoffs held |
| 1932 | 42-27 | 1st | Walter Holke | No playoffs held |
| 1931 | 55-68 | 6th | Frank Kohlbecker | No playoffs held |
| 1930 | 53-76 | 8th | Earl Wolgamot | No playoffs held |
| 1929 | 72-66 | 4th | Earl Wolgamot | No playoffs held |
| 1928 | 75-59 | 2nd | Pat Haley | Lost in League Finals |
| 1927 | 70-66 | 4th | Bob Wells | No playoffs held |
| 1926 | 73-61 | 3rd | Roy Whitcraft | No playoffs held |
| 1925 | 81-54 | 2nd | Roy Whitcraft | No playoffs held |
| 1924 | 75-62 | 1st | Roy Whitcraft | League champions |
| 1923 | 71-60 | 3rd | Ernie Robertson | No playoffs held |
| 1922 | 85-51 | 1st | Bob Coleman | League champions |
| 1921 | 70-65 | 3rd | Bob Coleman | No playoffs held |
