= Bubba Morton =

American baseball player (1931–2006)

- Outfielder
- Born: December 13, 1931; Washington, D.C., U.S.
- Died: January 14, 2006 (aged 74); Seattle, Washington, U.S.
- Batted: Right Threw: Right

MLB debut
- April 19, 1961, for the Detroit Tigers

Last MLB appearance
- September 28, 1969, for the California Angels

MLB statistics
- Batting average: .267
- Home runs: 14
- Runs batted in: 128
- Stats at Baseball Reference

Teams
- Detroit Tigers (1961–1963); Milwaukee Braves (1963); California Angels (1966–1969); Toei Flyers (1970)

Wycliffe Nathaniel "Bubba" Morton (December 13, 1931 – January 14, 2006) was an American right fielder in Major League Baseball who played for the Detroit Tigers (1961–1963), Milwaukee Braves (1963) and California Angels (1966–1969). He batted and threw right-handed, stood 5 feet 10 inches (1.78 m) tall and weighed 175 pounds (79 kg). He became the first African American coach in any sport at the University of Washington.

== Early life ==
Morton was born in Washington, D.C. on December 13, 1931 or December 13, 1932. He graduated from Armstrong High School in 1950. He could not play baseball his senior year because he had signed a professional baseball contract. In his junior year he was all-conference and helped the team win a championship. Morton later graduated from Howard University in 1957, having played on the football and baseball teams. He also had a four year stint in the United States Coast Guard.

== Minor league baseball ==
In 1955, Morton became the third black player signed by the Detroit Tigers (though others beat him to the major leagues). It has also been stated he was the first black player signed by the Tigers. He was in the Tigers minor league system from 1955-60.

He was one of the first black men to play for the post-war Terre Haute franchise of the Three-I League in 1956. Morton was one of the first two black men to play for the Class-B Durham Bulls, and has also been reported as the first. With the Bulls in 1957, he batted .310 with 18 home runs and 82 runs batted in (RBI) to lead the club to their first Carolina League championship; winning a place on the all-star team.

He played different levels of Single-A baseball in 1958, and then played Triple-A baseball for the Charleston Senators in 1959, batting .285 with 57 runs scored, but only two home runs. He played Triple-A ball again in 1960, for the Denver Bears, batting .296, with nine home runs, 10 triples, 35 doubles and 107 runs.

== Major league baseball ==
A light-hitting, strong-armed outfielder, Morton played with the Tigers as a reserve in parts of three seasons (all of 1961-62, and part of 1963). In 1961, he hit .287 in 108 at bats; and .262 in 195 at bats the following year. In 1963, after only six games played for the Tigers, his contract rights were purchased by the Milwaukee Braves from Detroit in early May.

He played the majority of 1963 for the Braves Triple-A affiliate, the Toronto Maple Leafs. During his brief 15-game tenure with the Braves, he was the roommate of Hank Aaron. The next two years Morton played at Triple-A for the Milwaukee Braves and Cleveland Indians organizations, hitting over .300 for both Triple-A teams, until he was acquired by the California Angels at the end of the 1965 season. In 1966, Morton the Angels assigned to the 1966 Seattle Angels team that won the Pacific Coast League pennant. He did play in 15 games for the major league Angels that year.

Morton saw considerable action with the Angels between 1967 and 1969, the only seasons after 1961-62 where he played the entire season on a major league roster. A prime pinch-hitter, his best season was 1967, when he hit .313 in 80 games, the highest average on the team for a player with over 200 at bats. During the same period he committed only one error in 251 chances in the outfield. He platooned with Jimmie Hall in right field, facing left-handed pitching, and sparked the team to 32 wins in their last 44 games. The Angels finished 84–77, 7.5 games out of first place. In 1968, he hit .270 in 163 at bats, and in 1969 (his final year in the major leagues) he hit seven home runs with 32 RBIs in only 172 at bats.

In a seven-season major league career, Morton was a .267 hitter with 14 home runs and 128 RBIs in 451 games. He finished his career with a .989 fielding percentage.

After finishing in with the major league Angels in 1969, Morton moved to Japan to play the 1970 season with the Toei Flyers.

== Coaching ==
In 1972, Morton was hired by athletics director Joe Kearney as head coach of the baseball program at the University of Washington (UW) from 1972 to 1976. He is distinguished as UW's first black head coach in any sport.

== Personal life ==
After his retirement from baseball, Morton worked as a director of boys sports at the Bush School in Seattle. He also worked for Boeing and was a retired Coast Guard reservist.

== Death ==
Morton died in Seattle, Washington, at the age of 74.
