= Terre Haute Phillies =

- 1946–1956; Terre Haute, Indiana

Minor league affiliations
- Previous classes: Class B (1946-1956)
- League: Three-I League (1946-1956)

Major league affiliations
- Previous teams: Philadelphia Phillies (1946-1954); Detroit Tigers (1955-1956)

Minor league titles
- League titles: 3 1950, 1951, 1953

Team data
- Previous names: Terre Haute Huts (1955-1956)
- Previous parks: Memorial Stadium

The Terre Haute Phillies were a baseball team in Terre Haute, Indiana from 1946 to 1954. They were a Three-I League team affiliated with the Philadelphia Phillies. They won the league championship in 1950 and 1952. They became the Terre Haute Huts for the 1955–1956 seasons when the affiliation changed to the Detroit Tigers. Their games were played at Memorial Stadium ballpark in Terre Haute.

== The ballpark ==
Terre Haute teams played at Memorial Stadium, located at the NE corner of Brown and Wabash. Today, the site is the football stadium for Indiana State University, but the original arches from the old stadium remain.

== Notable alumni ==
- Willie Jones (1947) 2 x MLB All-Star
- Hub Kittle (1953–1954, MGR)
- Stan Lopata (1946) 2 x MLB All-Star
- Charlie Metro (1956)
- Pat Riley (batboy 1949)
- Bob Miller (1948–1949)
- Bubba Morton (1956)
- Skeeter Newsome (1951–1952, MGR)
- Stubby Overmire (1955)
- Jim Owens (1953)

== Year-by-year record ==
Year	Record	Finish	Manager	Playoffs
1954	60-76	7th	Hub Kittle	Did not qualify
1953	76-52	1st	Hub Kittle	Lost in 1st round
1952	75-49	2nd	Skeeter Newsome	League Champs
1951	75-55	1st	Skeeter Newsome	Lost in 1st round
1950	78-48	1st	Danny Carnevale	League Champs
1949	69-56	3rd	Lee Riley	Lost in 1st round
1948	65-57	4th	Pat Colgan / Dale Jones	Lost League Finals
1947	74-51	2nd	Ray Brubaker / Whitey Gluchoski / Jack Sanford	Lost in 1st round
1946	63-60	4th	Ray Brubaker	Lost League Finals
