= Bob Coleman =

American baseball figure (1890–1959)

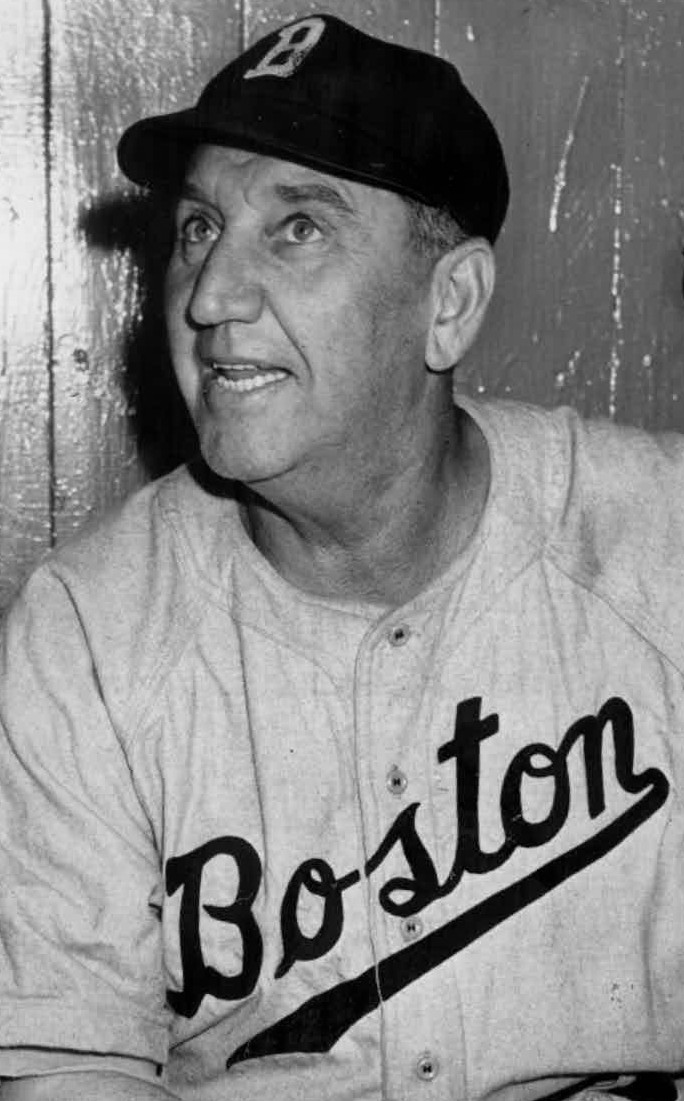
- Coleman as a Boston Brave (1943–45)
- Catcher / Coach / Manager
- Born: September 26, 1890; Huntingburg, Indiana, U.S.
- Died: July 16, 1959 (aged 68); Boston, Massachusetts, U.S.
- Batted: Right Threw: Right

MLB debut
- June 13, 1913, for the Pittsburgh Pirates

Last MLB appearance
- September 9, 1916, for the Cleveland Indians

MLB statistics
- Batting average: .241
- Home runs: 1
- Runs batted in: 27
- Games managed: 295
- Managerial record: 128–165
- Winning %: .437
- Stats at Baseball Reference

Teams
- As player: Pittsburgh Pirates (1913–1914); Cleveland Indians (1916); As manager: Boston Braves (1943, 1944–1945); As coach: Boston Red Sox (1926); Detroit Tigers (1932); Boston Braves (1943)

Career highlights and awards
- Won 2,496 games as a minor league manager; 6× Three-I League Manager of the Year (1935, 1937, 1938, 1941, 1946, 1951)

Robert Hunter Coleman (September 26, 1890 – July 16, 1959) was an American catcher, coach and manager in Major League Baseball. Notably, he served two terms as pilot of the Boston Braves of the National League—as acting skipper from April 24 to June 17, 1943, and as the Braves' official field leader from the start of 1944 through July 29, 1945.

Coleman also was one of the most successful managers in the history of minor league baseball, where, between 1919 and 1957 (with interruptions caused by major league service) he won ten regular season pennants and five league playoff titles. He won his first pennant with the 1922 Terre Haute Tots of the Three-I League, and he also won a championship with the 1935 Springfield Senators, also of the Three-I League. The rest of his titles came with the Evansville, Indiana, franchise in that circuit.

== Early life and career ==
A native of Huntingburg, Indiana, Coleman played just three seasons in the majors, with the Pittsburgh Pirates (1913–14) and the Cleveland Indians (1916). The New York Times took notice of the fact that Coleman "accepted 13 chances on the 13th day of June in the year 1913" during a 3–2 loss to the New York Giants. The right-handed-hitting catcher batted .241 with 55 hits and one home run in 116 total games.

In 1919, at age 28, he embarked on his managerial career with the Mobile Bears of the Class A Southern Association. By 1926 he was a coach for the Boston Red Sox, but the following season he returned to the minor leagues, and in 1928 he became manager of the Evansville Hubs of the Class B Three-I League, where he would spend much of the rest of his baseball career. He managed Evansville for 20 seasons over four separate tours of duty (1928–31; 1938–42; 1946–49; 1951–57), and won eight pennants there (1930, 1938, 1941, 1949, 1952, 1954, 1956 and 1957) including his final season.

Coleman made it back to the majors as a coach with the Detroit Tigers in 1932 and the Boston Braves in 1943. On April 20, 1943, four days before the National League season was about to begin, his boss, manager Casey Stengel, suffered a broken leg when he was hit by a taxicab as he tried to cross a Boston street. Coleman stepped in for 46 games, through June 17, while Stengel recovered (the Braves winning 21). At season's end, Stengel was fired and Coleman was named permanent manager of the Braves for 1944. But the wartime Braves were not contenders and after a sixth-place 1944 finish was followed by a sluggish start to 1945, Coleman was replaced by one of his coaches, Del Bissonette, on July 29. His final record as a Major League manager was 128–165–2 (.437).

He then returned to Evansville as manager of the Evansville Braves, a Boston farm team, and resumed his minor league career. In 35 seasons as a minor league skipper, Coleman's teams won 2,496 games and lost 2,103 (.543).

In 1958, the Milwaukee Braves named Coleman to their scouting staff. One year later, on July 16, 1959, he died in Boston from cancer at age 68.

=== MLB managerial record ===
| Team | Year | Regular season | | | | | Postseason | | | |
| Team | Year | Games | Won | Lost | Win % | Finish | Won | Lost | Win % | Result |
|---|---|---|---|---|---|---|---|---|---|---|
| BSN | 1943 | 46 | 21 | 25 | .457 | Sixth; Acting manager 4/24–6/17 | – | – | – | – |
| BSN | 1944 | 155 | 65 | 89 | .422 | Sixth | – | – | – | – |
| BSN | 1945 | 94 | 42 | 51 | .452 | Seventh; Fired 7/29 | – | – | – | – |
| Total | | 295 | 128 | 165 | .437 | | 0 | 0 | – | |
