= Marv Owen =

American baseball player (1906–1991)

- Third baseman
- Born: March 22, 1906; Agnew, California, U.S.
- Died: June 22, 1991 (aged 85); Mountain View, California, U.S.
- Batted: Right Threw: Right

MLB debut
- April 16, 1931, for the Detroit Tigers

Last MLB appearance
- August 2, 1940, for the Boston Red Sox

MLB statistics
- Batting average: .275
- Home runs: 31
- Runs batted in: 499
- Stats at Baseball Reference

Teams
- Detroit Tigers (1931, 1933–1937); Chicago White Sox (1938–1939); Boston Red Sox (1940)

Career highlights and awards
- World Series champion (1935)

Marvin James Owen (March 22, 1906 – June 22, 1991) was an American baseball player, manager, coach and scout.

A native of northern California, Owen played both baseball and football at Santa Clara University. He made his Major League Baseball debut in 1931, but spent the 1932 season in the International League where he was named the league's Most Valuable Player. He returned to the Tigers in 1933, became part of Detroit's "Battalion of Death" infield, and remained the team's starting third baseman from 1933 to 1937. He had his best season in 1934 when he compiled a .317 batting average with 98 RBIs. He was involved in a fight with Joe Medwick during the final game of the 1934 World Series that led to a near riot and Medwick's ejection from the game.

In December 1937, Owen was traded to the Chicago White Sox where he played in 1938 and 1939 and compiled a career-high 305 assists in 1938. In December 1939, he was sold to the Boston Red Sox where he concluded his major league career during the 1940 season. During his nine-year career in Major League Baseball, Owen compiled a .275 batting average and .339 on-base percentage, appeared in 1,011 games, and totaled 1,388 total bases, 1,040 hits, 499 RBIs, 474 runs scored, 338 bases on balls, and 242 extra base hits.

Owen later served as a minor league manager for 11 years for the Portland Beavers (1944–1946), San Jose Red Sox (1947–1951), Davenport Tigers (1952), Durham Bulls (1953), and Valdosta Tigers (1954). He was also a scout for the Detroit Tigers until retiring in the 1970s.

== Early years ==
Owen was born in Agnew, California (now part of Santa Clara), and attended Bellarmine College Preparatory. He then attended Santa Clara University where he played for the Broncos baseball and football teams. In his senior year at Santa Clara, he was declared ineligible to play baseball as he had signed an optional contract to play professional baseball for the Seattle Indians. Instead, he served as the coach of the Santa Clara baseball team during his senior year.

== Playing career ==
=== Seattle Indians (1930) ===
Owen began his professional baseball career in 1930 with the Seattle Indians of the Pacific Coast League. He appeared in 138 games and compiled a .300 batting average with 24 doubles and seven triples.

=== Detroit Tigers (1931) ===
Prior to the 1931 season, Owen was purchased by the Detroit Tigers from the Seattle Indians. Tigers manager Bucky Harris rated Owen as "the greatest prospect the American League has seen in many years." During the 1931 season, Owen appeared in 105 games, 37 as the team's starting shortstop, 34 as the third baseman, and 21 as the second baseman.

=== Newark Bears (1932) ===
After batting only .223 with the Tigers in 1931, Owen returned to the minors. He split the 1932 season in the International League with the Toronto Maple Leafs and the Newark Bears. In October 1932, he hit a home run to clinch the Little World Series championship for Newark. He was named the Most Valuable Player in the International League for the 1932 season.

=== Detroit Tigers ===
==== 1933 season ====
In 1933, Owen returned to the Tigers and became the team's starting third baseman. He was part of an infield that became known as the "Battalion of Death" consisting of Hank Greenberg at first, Charlie Gehringer at second, Billy Rogell at shortstop, and Owen at third. The Battalion of Death remained intact from 1933 to 1935 (until injury sidelined Greenberg in 1936) and was considered one of the best infield combinations in baseball history. Owen appeared in 138 games in 1933, 134 of them as the Tigers' starting third baseman, compiled a .262 batting average, and collected 64 RBIs.

==== 1934 season ====
In 1934, the Tigers' Battalion of Death infield collected 769 hits (214 by Gehringer, 201 by Greenberg, 179 by Owen and 175 by Rogell), 462 RBIs (139 by Greenberg, 127 by Gehringer, 100 by Rogell, and 96 by Owen), and 179 doubles (63 by Greenberg, 50 by Gehringer, 34 by Owen and 32 by Rogell). Three members of the 1934 Tigers infield (Gehringer, Owen and Rogell) played in all 154 games, and the fourth (Greenberg) played in 153. Three members of the 1934 infield finished in the top ten in voting for the American League Most Valuable Player award – Gehringer second, Greenberg sixth and Owen ninth.

Owen also stood out on defense in 1934, turning a career high 33 double plays at third base. He also led the American League's third baseman with 202 putouts. Since 1934, only two major league third basemen (Willie Jones and Eddie Yost) have had more putouts than Owen's 1934 tally. Owen's hands were so large that he was reportedly able to hold and secure seven baseballs in each hand. He was featured in Ripley's Believe It or Not! with the claim that he "can hold 7 baseballs in one hand."

The 1934 Tigers won the American League pennant with a 101–53 record but lost the 1934 World Series to the St. Louis Cardinals. In Game 7 of the World Series at Navin Field, Joe Medwick of the Cardinals tripled in the sixth inning and knocked Owen down with a hard slide at third. Owen stepped on Medwick, and Medwick, as he lay on the ground, "suddenly began lashing out at Owen's legs with his spiked feet." The two players fought, and, when Medwick returned to left field in the bottom of the inning, the Detroit spectators began pelting him with fruit, bottles, and other debris. Sports writer Paul Gallico described the fans as "a deadly and vicious mob" and added:

"The next moment the air was full of flying fruit, apples, oranges, bananas and beer and pop bottles . . . I watched the crowd and Medwick and the pelting missiles through my field glasses, and it was a terrifying sight. Every face in the crowd, women and men was distorted with rage."

Eventually, and to prevent a full riot, Commissioner Kenesaw Mountain Landis ordered Medwick removed from the game. Interviewed in 1989, Owen recalled, "Medwick slid extra hard into me at third base. When he did that, I kicked him in the groin and he didn't like that."

==== 1935 season ====
Prior to the 1935 season, Owen had surgery on his nose and reported sick to spring training. He sustained a strained muscle in spring training and was benched for two weeks in June to allow the injury to heal. Owen appeared in 131 games as the Tigers' starting third baseman in 1935. Despite the injuries, he continued to contribute defensively, ranking third among the American League's third basemen with 19 double plays and a .958 fielding percentage. He helped the Tigers win their second consecutive American League pennant, but his batting average dropped by 54 points to .263. He also compiled poor batting statistics in the post-season with an .069 average in the 1934 World Series and .050 in the 1935 World Series, in which the Tigers defeated the Chicago Cubs in six games. He set a record with 31 consecutive World Series plate appearances without a hit.

==== 1936–1937 ====
In 1936, Owen had one of his best seasons. He compiled a .295 batting average and a .361 on-base percentage with a career high 105 RBIs. He also led the American League's third basemen with 190 putouts and 28 double plays. In 1937, he missed a portion of the season with a fractured hand, appearing in only 107 games, 102 as the team's starting third baseman. In those appearances, Owen compiled a .288 batting average and a .358 on-base percentage and led the American League third basemen with a .970 fielding percentage.

=== Chicago White Sox (1938–1939) ===
Owen was traded along with Gee Walker and Mike Tresh from the Tigers to the Chicago White Sox for Dixie Walker, Vern Kennedy and Tony Piet on December 2, 1937. During the 1938 season, Owen appeared in 141 games for the White Sox, 139 as the starting third baseman, and compiled a .287 batting average with 35 extra base hits and 55 RBIs. He also collected a career high 305 assists in 1938. In 1939, he appeared in only 58 games, the fewest in his major league career up to that point.

=== Boston Red Sox (1940) ===
In December 1939, the White Sox sold Owen to the Boston Red Sox for an undisclosed amount of money. Owen concluded his major league career appearing in 20 games for the Boston Red Sox during the 1940 season.

During his nine-year career in Major League Baseball, Owen compiled a .275 batting average and .339 on-base percentage, appeared in 1,011 games, and totaled 1,388 total bases, 1,040 hits, 499 RBIs, 474 runs scored, 338 bases on balls, and 242 extra base hits.

=== Portland Beavers (1941–1946) ===
In March 1941, Owen signed with the Portland Beavers of the Pacific Coast League. He appeared in 144 games for Portland during the 1941 season. He continued to play for the Beavers through the 1946 season.

== Managerial career ==
In 1944, Owen took over as the player-manager of the Portland Beavers. In three years as the manager, he compiled records of 87–82 in 1944, 112–68 in 1945, and 74–109 in 1946.

In December 1946, Owen signed to manage the San Jose Red Sox in the California State League. He also played for San Jose until an injury led him to announce his retirement as a player in June 1947 at age 41. He continued to manage the San Jose club through the 1951 season. In November 1951, Owen requested and received his release from the San Jose club.

In January 1952, he was hired as the manager of the Davenport Tigers in the Illinois–Indiana–Iowa League. After one year as manager at Davenport, Owen was hired in January 1953 as the manager of the Durham Bulls. After one year as manager at Durham, Owen served as the manager of the Valdosta Tigers during the 1954 season.

Owen later served as a scout, and eventually scouting supervisor, for the Detroit Tigers until he retired in the mid-1970s.

== Family and death ==
In December 1938, Owen married Violet Walsh, a Detroit public school teacher. Teammate Charlie Gehringer was his best man. They had a son, Skip, in approximately 1944. Owen died in 1991 at age 85 at a nursing home in Mountain View, California, having suffered from Alzheimer's disease. He was buried at the Mission Santa Clara de Asís cemetery.

A baseball on which Owen gathered the signatures of 11 of the first 12 members of the Baseball Hall of Fame was sold at auction in August 2018 for $623,369. He had preserved the ball inside a fur-lined glove kept in a safe deposit box until his death in 1991.
