= Morrie Arnovich =

American baseball player (1910–1959)

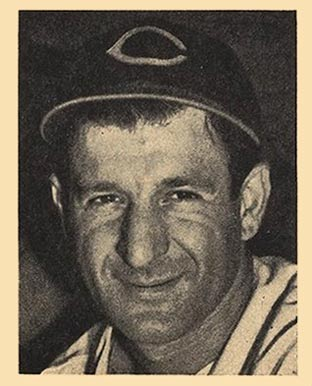
- Left fielder
- Born: November 16, 1910; Superior, Wisconsin, U.S.
- Died: July 20, 1959 (aged 48); Superior, Wisconsin, U.S.
- Batted: Right Threw: Right

MLB debut
- September 14, 1936, for the Philadelphia Phillies

Last MLB appearance
- April 21, 1946, for the New York Giants

MLB statistics
- Batting average: .287
- Home runs: 22
- Runs batted in: 261
- Stats at Baseball Reference

Teams
- Philadelphia Phillies (1936–1940); Cincinnati Reds (1940); New York Giants (1941, 1946)

Career highlights and awards
- All-Star (1939); World Series champion (1940)

Morris Arnovich (November 16, 1910 – July 20, 1959), nicknamed "Snooker", was an American baseball player. Arnovich played in Major League Baseball between 1936 and 1946 and played in the World Series winning team in 1940 as a part of the Cincinnati Reds. Playing as a line drive hitter, and fielding as an outfielder he began in MLB for the Philadelphia Phillies in 1936 where he played four seasons before joining the Reds for a season. After his time in Cincinnati, he joined the New York Giants for the 1941 season, and again for one game in 1946 after joining the United States Army.

A member of the 1939 National League All-Star team, he finished his career with a .287 batting average. After retiring, Arnovich coached basketball and died in 1959 of a coronary occlusion.

== Early and personal life ==
Arnovich was born in Superior, Wisconsin on November 16, 1910. One of the most religious Jewish major leaguers, Arnovich kept kosher his whole life. He attended Superior High School in Superior, Wisconsin. Arnovich was a two-time All-Wisconsin basketball star at the University of Wisconsin–Superior. He was later given the nickname "snooker", after being prolific in the British game of the same name.

== Baseball career ==
Arnovich's professional baseball career began at age 22 with the Superior Blues, the champions of the newly revived Northern League in 1933. Playing as a shortstop that year, he hit .331 and had a slugging percentage of .495 with 17 steals. Throughout the season he hit 14 home runs, putting him fourth in the league. His .918 fielding percentage was best of any shortstop with 50 or more games that season and made the unofficial All-Star team listed by the Spalding Guide. Returning to Superior in 1934, Arnovich hit .374 to take the Northern League batting title, and his 21 home runs (three in one game) tied for fifth.

The Philadelphia Phillies purchased his contract in 1935, where he turned up for spring training with regulars remarking that "he'll never make it". The Phillies assigned him to the Hazleton Mountaineers of the New York–Pennsylvania League where he hit .305. In 1936, he hit .327 with 19 home runs and 109 runs batted in (RBI) in the minor leagues. He also played his first games in Major League Baseball in 1936, debuting September 14, 1936, where he made .313 batting average over 13 games. He moved to the outfield, playing mostly in left field for the rest of his career. In 1937, he hit .290 and had a career-high five double plays from the outfield, and made seven consecutive hits. In 1938, he made the most outfield assists of his career – 18. He was referred to as the "Son of Israel", or the "Next Jewish Star" by the Anglo-Jewish press.

When Phil Weintraub entered the armed forces, Arnovich took his spot in the Phillies lineup. For the 1939 season he was the top contact hitter in the National League before fading late and finishing fifth in the league with a .324 batting average, and sixth in the league with a .397 on base percentage. He also led all left fielders in putouts, with 335, and in range factor/game, at 2.61. He made the All-Star team in his best season, 18th in the MVP voting. Although originally not part of the team, a fan petition secured him a place on the roster, but he did not play.

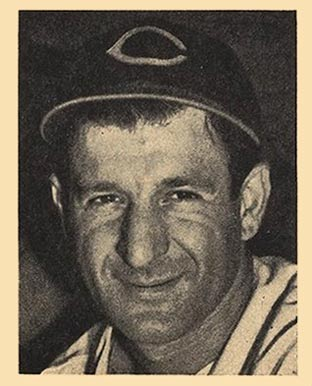
Arnovich in 1940

At the age of 29, Arnovich was traded to the Cincinnati Reds for Johnny Rizzo in June 1940 and had a disappointing season, though he continued to hit for solid contact (.284 with the Reds). He made his only World Series appearance that season, which Reds won 4–3 over the Detroit Tigers. He was sold to the New York Giants for $25,000 in December 1940, and had a .280 batting average in 85 games through 1941.

Arnovich tried to volunteer for the United States Army, but was turned down because he was missing a pair of molars. He got false teeth and volunteered again after Pearl Harbor in 1942; this time he was permitted in and spent the next four years in the Army. He was a staff sergeant for the Army in the Pacific Theater of Operations. While in the Army, Arnovich played for and managed the Fort Lewis baseball team, before becoming a postal clerk in New Guinea.

Out of condition and now 35 years old, Morrie played in one game for the New York Giants in 1946 and was sent down to the Jersey City Giants, where he went 5 for 25 in 10 games before being released in June 1946. In 1947 Arnovich hit in the .370s in the Three-I League and Western Association, then batted .353 in limited time in the 1948 in the Southeastern League with the Selma Cloverleafs before retiring at the age of 37. In 2010 he was ranked ninth in career batting average among Jewish major league baseball players of all-time.

== Career statistics ==
In 590 games over seven seasons, Arnovich posted a .287 batting average (577-for-2013) with 234 runs, 104 doubles, 12 triples, 22 home runs, 261 RBIs, 17 stolen bases and 185 base on balls. He also had a .350 on-base percentage and .383 slugging percentage. Defensively, he recorded a .981 fielding percentage playing primarily at left field, but played several games at center and right field.

== Later years and death ==
Arnovich gave out free baseball lessons to teenagers in Superior, Arnovich would manage both the Davenport Cubs, and Selma Cloverleafs of the Cub's farm teams, and was a basketball coach at a local Catholic high school. He married Bertha Aserson on July 10, 1956, and ran a jewelry and sporting goods shop. On July 20, 1959, he died of a coronary occlusion at his home shortly after his third wedding anniversary. Arnovich was buried at the Hebrew Cemetery in Superior, Wisconsin.

== See also ==
- List of Jewish Major League Baseball players
