= Hub Kittle =

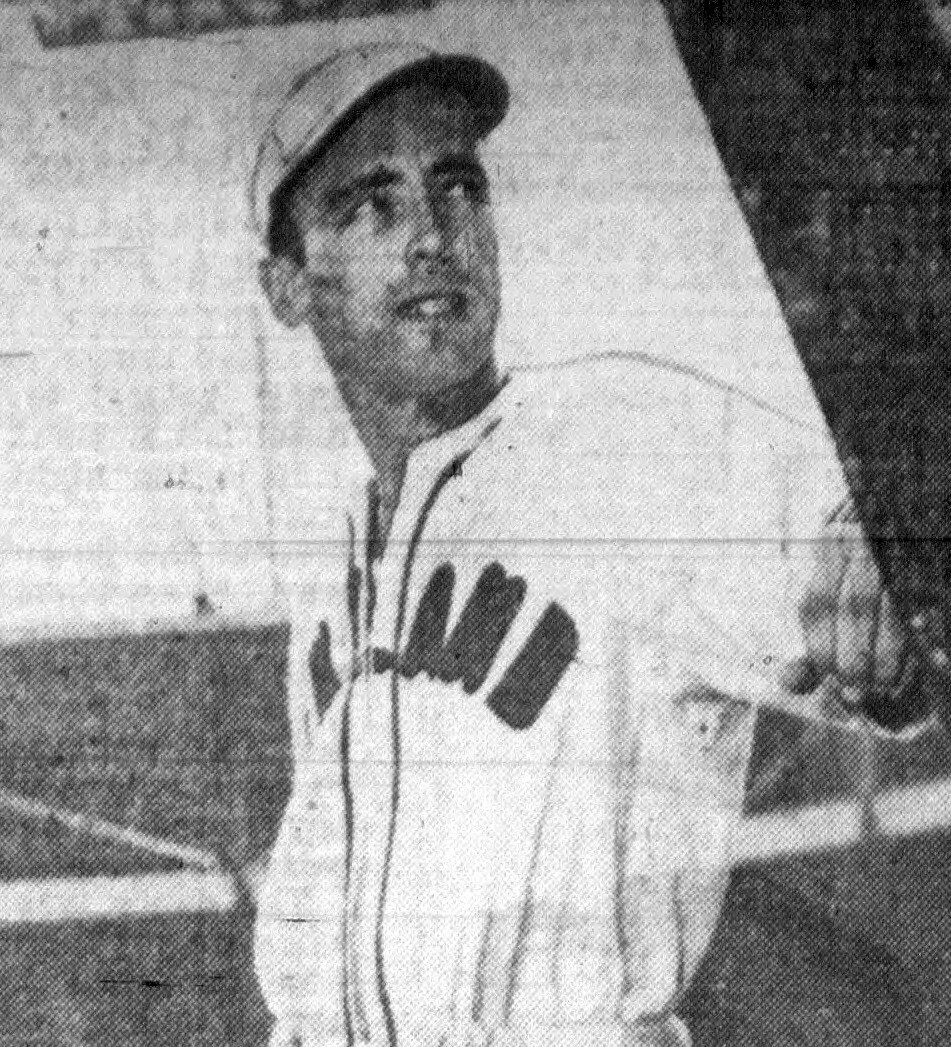
- Kittle, circa 1943
- Coach
- Born: February 19, 1917; Los Angeles, California, U.S.
- Died: February 10, 2004 (aged 86); Yakima, Washington, U.S.
- Batted: Right Threw: Right
- Stats at Baseball Reference

Teams
- Houston Astros (1971–1975); St. Louis Cardinals (1981–1983)

Career highlights and awards
- World Series champion (1982)

Hubert Milton Kittle (February 19, 1917 – February 10, 2004) was an American professional baseball pitcher, manager and front office executive in the minor leagues and a pitching coach at the Major League level. When he took the mound for the Triple-A Springfield Redbirds in an official American Association game on August 27, 1980, at the age of 63, Kittle, a longtime minor league hurler whose professional career began in the 1930s, became the only man ever to pitch in professional baseball in six decades. He retired the Iowa Oaks on 11 pitches.

== 22 years as a minor league pitcher ==
Kittle was born in Los Angeles and attended Fairfax High School then San Diego State University. As a player, he threw and batted right-handed, stood 6 feet 1 inch (1.85 m) tall and weighed 195 pounds (88 kg). He began his pitching career in 1937 with the Ponca City Angels of the Class C Western Association, a farm club of the Chicago Cubs. Two years later, Kittle won 20 of 30 decisions pitching for the Yakima Pippins of the Class B Western International League—beginning a long association with professional baseball in Yakima, Washington, and the Pacific Northwest.

Including his two years of military service during World War II, Kittle's active pitching career prior to his 1980 Springfield appearance spanned 22 years (1937–55, plus cameos as a fill-in pitcher during his minor-league managerial career in 1958, 1966 and 1969). His appearance in the 1970s came in a Major League uniform during his tenure as the pitching coach of the Houston Astros, when he hurled in an exhibition game against the Detroit Tigers at the Astrodome at the age of 56 in 1973. All told, as a minor league pitcher, Kittle won 144 games and lost 115 (.556). He won 7 games and lost 6 during his three stints (1940–41; 1943) at the highest minor league level, in the Pacific Coast League.

== Minor league manager and executive ==
Kittle's minor league managerial career was almost as long as his pitching tenure. It extended for 20 years (1948–59; 1964–70; 1977); he won regular season pennants with the 1950 Salt Lake City Bees in the Pioneer League, the 1953 Terre Haute Phillies of the Illinois–Indiana–Iowa League and the 1956 Yakima Bears of the Northwest League. His 1966 Austin Braves captured the playoff championship of the Texas League.

In addition, Kittle was general manager of the Yakima Bears, and both the Hawaii Islanders and Portland Beavers of the Pacific Coast circuit. He was selected Minor League Executive of the Year (lower classification) by The Sporting News in 1960. Kittle managed in the Philadelphia Phillies, Milwaukee/Atlanta Braves, Houston Astros and St. Louis Cardinals organizations. His career managerial record was 1,329 victories and 1,250 defeats (.515).

== Major League coach for Astros and Cardinals ==
Kittle finally reached the Major Leagues in 1971 when he was named an Astros' coach by manager Harry Walker. He spent five years on Houston's MLB staff, and was the team's pitching coach in 1973, working with celebrated pitchers such as Larry Dierker, J. R. Richard and Don Wilson. In 1976, he joined the Cardinals' organization, and spent the next two decades with the Redbirds as a minor league manager, roving minor league pitching instructor, and Major League pitching coach from 1981–83. He was the pitching coach for the 1982 World Series champion Cardinals.

He was still working with St. Louis' minor league pitchers as he neared his 80th birthday. "He's the Santa Claus of pitching coaches", Cardinals' field coordinator of instruction George Kissell said in 1989. "Only he can't come down the chimney anymore, his bag is so full of tricks. Nobody teaches pitching like he does."

Late in life, Kittle maintained his connection to baseball in the Pacific Northwest as a special, part-time pitching instructor in the Seattle Mariners' organization. He died at age 86 in Yakima from complications of kidney failure and diabetes.

== See also ==
- List of St. Louis Cardinals coaches

| Preceded by Jim Owens | Houston Astros pitching coach 1973 | Succeeded by Roger Craig |
| Preceded by Claude Osteen | St. Louis Cardinals pitching coach 1981–1983 | Succeeded by Mike Roarke |
