= Ray Brubaker =

American baseball player and manager

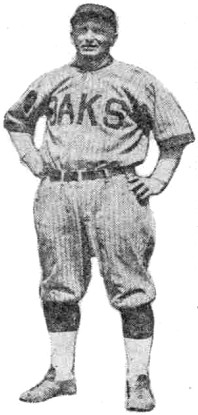
Brubaker, circa 1920

Ray Keith Brubaker (November 19, 1892 – May 1, 1947) was an American professional baseball player and manager. Brubaker never appeared in Major League Baseball, but was a stalwart in the minor leagues, playing for 14 1/2 seasons for the Oakland Oaks of the Pacific Coast League, and continuing as a manager at all levels of the minors.

His life and career ended at age 54 when he suffered a fatal heart attack while managing his team, the Terre Haute Phillies of the Class B Illinois–Indiana–Iowa League, during a league game against the Waterloo White Hawks on May 1, 1947.

== Lengthy playing career ==
Brubaker was a native of Portland, Indiana. He attended Earlham College, Richmond, Indiana, and spent off-seasons as a teacher and coach in his hometown's school system.

Primarily a shortstop as an active player, he threw and batted right-handed, stood 5 feet 9 inches (1.75 m) tall and weighed 170 pounds (77 kg). Although his first pro experience came as early as 1912 with Tulsa in the Oklahoma State League, Brubaker's playing career began in earnest in 1914. He joined Oakland during the 1920 minor league season, and played in 1,833 games for the Oaks through 1934, spending two seasons (1933–34) as playing manager. All told, he played 2,338 minor-league games, collected over 2,180 hits (including 25 home runs) and batted .286. Through 1946, Brubaker managed nine different minor league clubs, and served in the organizations of the Chicago White Sox, Detroit Tigers and Philadelphia Phillies.

== Fatally stricken in dugout during game ==
After managing the 1946 Terre Haute Phillies to a fourth place, 63–60 mark in 1946 and a playoff berth, Brubaker was invited to return for 1947.

But, according to a 2012 retrospective in the Terre Haute Tribune-Star, Brubaker was in poor health during the early weeks of the 1947 season. Before the May 1 game in Waterloo, Iowa, he complained of indigestion, but accompanied his team to the ballpark for their contest against the White Hawks. During the ninth inning of a tense, 3–3 game, he collapsed in the visitors' dugout. The game was halted and Brubaker was carried to the team's clubhouse, where he was pronounced dead from a heart attack.

His funeral was held six days later in Portland. Pitcher Whitey Gluchoski, who was Brubaker's third-base coach during the May 1 game, temporarily assumed the managerial reins. Terre Haute finished the season in second place in the 1947 Three-I League but was eliminated during the first round of the playoffs by the eventual league champion White Hawks.
