= Art Pennington =

- First baseman
- Born: May 18, 1923; Memphis, Tennessee, U.S.
- Died: January 4, 2017 (aged 93); Cedar Rapids, Iowa, U.S.
- Batted: Switch Threw: Right

NLB debut
- 1941, for the Chicago American Giants

Last appearance
- 1950, for the Chicago American Giants

Negro American League statistics
- Batting average: .259
- Home runs: 3
- Runs batted in: 18

Teams
- Negro leagues (incomplete): Chicago American Giants (1941–1945, 1950); Birmingham Black Barons (1945); Mexican League: Monterrey Industriales (1946); Veracruz Azules (1946); Puebla Angeles (1946–1948)

Career highlights and awards
- 2× Negro league All-Star (1942, 1950)

Arthur David "Superman" Pennington (May 18, 1923 – January 4, 2017) was an American Negro league baseball all-star player in the 1940s.

Pennington played for the Chicago American Giants (1941–1945, 1950), the Birmingham Black Barons (1945), as well as in the Mexican Baseball League (1946–1948), the U.S. minor league system (1949, 1952–1954, 1958–1959), and in Cuban and Venezuelan leagues.

He played in the 1942 and 1950 East-West All-Star Game.

Pennington retired from Rockwell Collins in 1985; his house was badly damaged in a 2008 flood that destroyed most of his personal baseball memorabilia.

He is included as card # 97 in the Topps 2009 Allen & Ginter baseball card nostalgia set.
