= Lou Scoffic =

American baseball player (1913–1997)

- Outfielder
- Born: May 20, 1913; Herrin, Illinois, U.S.
- Died: August 28, 1997 (aged 84); Herrin, Illinois, U.S.
- Batted: Right Threw: Right

MLB debut
- April 16, 1936, for the St. Louis Cardinals

Last MLB appearance
- May 9, 1936, for the St. Louis Cardinals

MLB statistics
- Games played: 4
- Batting average: .429
- Runs batted in: 2
- Stats at Baseball Reference

Teams
- St. Louis Cardinals (1936)

Louis Scoffic (May 20, 1913 – August 28, 1997) was an American professional baseball player who appeared in four games as a right fielder and pinch runner in Major League Baseball for the 1936 St. Louis Cardinals. Nicknamed "Weaser", he threw and batted right-handed, stood 5 feet 10 inches (1.78 m) tall, and weighed 182 pounds (83 kg).

Born in Herrin, Illinois, Scoffic played 12 seasons of pro ball (1933 through 1944), all of them in the Cardinal organization. He also managed in the Redbird system during all or parts of the 1940 and 1942 minor-league seasons.

His MLB "cup of coffee" occurred during April 1936. In his debut, on the 16th, he was the Cardinals' starting right fielder at Sportsman's Park in their third game of the campaign. Facing left-hander Larry French of the Chicago Cubs, Scoffic had two singles in four at bats, as the Cardinals fell, 5–3. Six days later, Scoffic went one for three, with a base on balls and two runs batted in, as St. Louis' starting right fielder against the Cincinnati Reds at Crosley Field; it was another losing effort, however, as the Cardinals fell, 7–6. After those two games, Scoffic never had another plate appearance in the majors; in his final two games, he was a pinch runner (scoring two runs) and defensive replacement.

Lou Scoffic died at age 84 in his home town of Herrin in August 1997.
