= Lee Maye =

American baseball player (1934–2002)

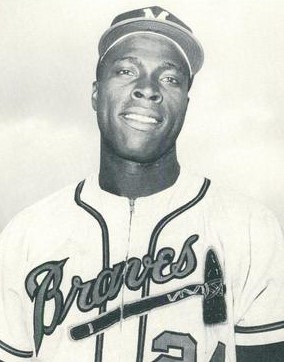
- Outfielder
- Born: December 11, 1934; Tuscaloosa, Alabama, U.S.
- Died: July 17, 2002 (aged 67); Riverside, California, U.S.
- Batted: Left Threw: Right

MLB debut
- June 17, 1959, for the Milwaukee Braves

Last MLB appearance
- June 29, 1971, for the Chicago White Sox

MLB statistics
- Batting average: .274
- Home run: 94
- Runs batted in: 419
- Stats at Baseball Reference

Teams
- Milwaukee Braves (1959–1965); Houston Astros (1965–1966); Cleveland Indians (1967–1969); Washington Senators (1969–1970); Chicago White Sox (1970–1971)

Arthur Lee Maye (December 11, 1934 – July 17, 2002) was an American Major League Baseball player. He played eleven seasons in the majors as an outfielder for the Milwaukee Braves (1959–1965), Houston Astros (1965–1966), Cleveland Indians (1967–1969), Washington Senators (1969–1970), and Chicago White Sox (1970–1971).

Maye was also well known as a rhythm & blues singer who was the lead singer of the Los Angeles–based doo-wop group Arthur Lee Maye and the Crowns in the 1950s.

== Early life ==
Maye was born on December 11, 1934, in Tuscaloosa, Alabama. He was raised in Los Angeles, and attended Jefferson High School. The Milwaukee Braves signed him as an amateur free agent in 1954. Maye also began his professional singing career in 1954, going by his full name "Arthur Lee Maye" rather than Lee Maye.

== Early baseball and music careers ==
Maye's dual career began at Los Angeles' Jefferson High School. Maye's first high school group was the Carmels, who he sang with throughout high school. He also sang in the school hallways with Jesse Belvin and future members of the Platters, the Penguins, and the Coasters. He was one of the progenitors of the harmonizing style of singing known as the "Jeff High Sound".

Maye starred in baseball for both Jefferson High and local semi-pro teams. Milwaukee Braves scout Johnny Moore not only saw his potential as a hitter with line drive power but clocked him in the 100-yard dash at under 10-seconds. Moore, whom the Braves held in high esteem, convinced the Braves to draft and sign him. Arthur Lee Maye later explained, "Baseball was my first love. I could always sing at fifty, but I couldn't play baseball at fifty."

He began his professional baseball career in 1954 with a Milwaukee Braves Pioneer League farm team in Boise, Idaho. At this time he also started his professional recording career, joining with Richard Berry and Johnny Coleman to record "The Fine One" b/w "Please Please Baby" as the "5" Hearts on the Flair label (the company put the "5" in quotes as only three sang on the record). They next released "Sweet Thing b/w "Rock Bottom" under the name "Rams." Maye also sang the "di-di-di's" behind Richard Berry on the original "Louie Louie."

== Minor league baseball ==
Maye played all or parts of the 1954–60 seasons in the Braves minor league system. Maye played for the Boise Pilots (Class-C 1954–55), Eau Claire Braves (Class-C 1955), Yakima Bears (Class-B 1955), Evansville Braves (Class-B 1955–56), Jacksonville Braves (Single-A 1957), Wichita Braves (Triple-A 1958), Austin Senators (Double-A 1958), and Louisville Colonels (Triple-A 1959–60).

His annual batting average was near or over .300 every year but 1957. In 1956 at Evansville, he hit .330, with 24 home runs, 99 runs batted in (RBI), 103 runs scored and an on-base plus slugging (OPS) of .934. In 1959 he split the season between Triple-A Louisville and the major league Braves team. At Louisville, he had a .339 batting average with 17 home runs, 79 RBIs, 64 runs scored and an OPS of 1.002, playing in only 94 games. He also split time between Louisville and Milwaukee in 1960, hitting .337 in 72 games for the Colonels.

He also played in the Puerto Rican Winter League (1958–62).

== Major league baseball ==
Maye was 6 ft 2 in (1.88 m) tall, and weighed 190 pounds (86.2 kg). He batted left-handed, but threw right-handed.

In a 13-year Major League Baseball career Maye played for the Milwaukee Braves, Houston Astros, Cleveland Indians, Washington Senators, and the Chicago White Sox. From 1961 to 1966, and again in 1969, he started in more than half of his team's games, with a high of 133 games started in 1964. Maye was also used quite often as a pinch-hitter during his 13-season career.

Maye was first called up to the Milwaukee Braves in 1959, hitting .300 in 51 games and 140 at bats. He was called up again in 1960, playing in 41 games, hitting .301 in 83 at bats. Maye won the starting left field position in 1961, but injured his shoulder on opening day and missed over a month of play. He still appeared in 110 games that year, hitting .271 in 373 at bats, with 14 home runs (his career high). He and future Baseball Hall of Fame teammate Eddie Mathews each hit home runs in every game of a three-game regular season series, which has only happened twice in team history.

After an excellent season in Puerto Rican winter ball in 1962, he suffered a respiratory infection severe enough to hospitalize him for two weeks, and caused him to miss two months of the Braves season. He played in only 99 games with a .244 batting average. During a game against the Chicago Cubs on August 8, 1962, Maye hit 2 home runs.

In 1963, he came back to play in 124 games, once again hitting .271, with 11 home runs in 442 at bats. In 1964, Maye had personal career-highs in almost every category; including 153 games played, 588 at bats, 96 rus, 74 RBIs, a .793 OPS, and a .304 batting average. He also led the National League with 44 doubles. On September 27, 1964, he had five hits in a game (four singles and a double) against the Philadelphia Phillies. (During the same year, his solo album Halfway Out of Love sold over 500,000 copies.) After the 1964 season, Maye, along with Hank Aaron, expressed concern about the team's moving from Milwaukee to Atlanta for fear of racial discrimination. He later flew to Atlanta before the 1965 season to specifically dispel the notion that he was concerned about playing there.

A 1965 ankle injury hurt his season and career. On May 1, he hurt his right knee and ankle. To his surprise, after appearing in only 15 games for the Braves, on May 23, he was traded to the Houston Astros for Ken Johnson and Jim Beauchamp. Maye went on to play in 108 games for the Astros that year, hitting .251 with only three home runs. Playing his 1966 home games in the Astrodome, he hit .288 with 9 home runs. in 115 games. On August 11, 1966, he once again had five hits in a game (four singles and a double), this time against the Cubs. Huey Meaux managed his music career during this time. Meaux got him studio time with JAMIE and regular bookings at popular Houston nightclubs.

The Astros traded him to Cleveland before the 1967 season for Jim Landis, Jim Weaver and Doc Edwards. He hit .259 in 115 games. In 1968, the year of the pitcher, Maye hit .281 in 109 games. Maye was traded to the Washington Senators during the 1969 season for Bill Denehy and cash. He batted .290 with 9 home runs for the Senators, in only 71 games. He had personality issues with Manager Ted Williams as a manager, but respected his knowledge.

In 1970, again under Williams, he played in only 96 games, hitting .263, when he was released by the Senators. He was claimed by the White Sox toward the end of the 1970 season. He played his final major league year in 1971 with the White Sox, hitting .205 in only 44 at bats. All, or most, of his MLB career was during baseball's second deadball era, with the major league scoring draught running from 1963 to 1972.

Lee Maye said, "The greatest thrill is not getting to the major leagues. It's staying there. I played 13 seasons when they had only 16 teams and I think that was a great accomplishment for me."

Maye's career totals include 1,288 games played, 1,109 hits, 94 home runs, 419 RBIs, and a lifetime batting average of .274. During his career, Maye also had eight 4-hit games, including two singles and two doubles, with four runs scored vs. the New York Yankees (April 21, 1970)

== Music career ==
Maye sang in a tenor and falsetto. Music journalist and critic Phil Milstein called his singing "deft" and "authoritative". He was considered one of the finest tenors coming from Los Angeles in the early rock and roll era. Maye recorded on over a dozen labels to include Modern, Tower, Specialty, ABC-Paramount, and Buddah, and opened a Hollywood Bowl show featuring Jerry Butler, Billy Stewart, and Barbara Mason. Maye told Milstein, "I am the best singing athlete that ever lived. I am not bragging. It's just a fact."

=== Arthur Lee Maye & The Crowns ===
He also formed the musical group Arthur Lee Maye & The Crowns in 1954, a "West Coast Rhythm and Blues Vocal Group", that also included Berry. The Crowns had back-to-back LA area hits on the Modern label with "Truly" and "Love Me Always." On the Specialty label in 1956, they sang their best known record, "Gloria." They also had an important 1956 record on the DIG label titled "This is the Night for Love." Maye said of his cross country stops, "I'd watch all of them, any entertainer when I was in a town. You learn from each other. My stage presence wasn't polished, so I'd go to learn how to get my stage presence from the other top guys who did it for a living".

== Baseball and music conflict ==
Arthur Lee Maye's baseball and music career often conflicted. He sang under the name Arthur Lee Maye but played baseball under Lee Maye. Another Lee May (Lee Andrew May) broke into Major League Baseball in 1965 and soon put up bigger home run and RBI numbers. Only one record credits his dual career. A 1959 release "Will You Be Mine" and "Honey Honey" on CASH had Lee Maye of the Milwaukee Braves on the label.

Playing baseball full-time created a time lag problem. Maye said, "When I was playing baseball all the requisite hours, I was a year behind in music, and I never got a chance to catch up with the music trend that I should have been with. I truly was behind the time, and I acknowledge that. Baseball and singing collided". He also knew that baseball prevented his going on tour to promote his songs. "When you're playing baseball and singing it's a very tough career for both of those, because you have to be at both places at the same time of the year, and you can't do that".

== Post-baseball career ==
Lee Maye tried for ten years after his playing career to find a job in organized baseball. He failed, as few non-playing baseball jobs existed for blacks at the time. His outspoken views on racism in baseball angered its owners. And Maye's artistic temperament sometimes clashed with teammates and coaches. Maye later worked with Amtrak until his retirement.

== Music career revival ==
In the mid-1980s, Maye returned to the recording studio with Dave Antrel and his Antrel Records, recording "Moonlight" b/w "Happy and In Love." "Moonlight" captured the later, early 1960s New York street corner sound. Arthur Lee Maye was very proud of "Moonlight." "Moonlight" made several compilation CDs, played a role in the novel '64 Intruder, and gets airplay on doo-wop radio programs. Maye had a European tour planned when he became stricken with liver cancer.

== Death ==
Maye died at the age of 67 in Riverside, California, of pancreatic cancer and is buried at Inglewood Park Cemetery in Inglewood, California.

== See also ==
- List of Major League Baseball annual doubles leaders
