= Evansville Braves =

- 1938–1957; (1938–1942, 1946–1957); Evansville, Indiana

Minor league affiliations
- Class: Class B (1938–1942, 1946–1957)
- League: Illinois-Indiana-Iowa League (1938–1942, 1946–1957)

Major league affiliations
- Team: Milwaukee Braves (1953–1957); Boston Braves/Boston Bees (1938–1942, 1946–1952)

Minor league titles
- League titles (4): 1946; 1948; 1956; 1957

Team data
- Name: Evansville Braves (1941–1942; 1946–1957); Evansville Bees (1938–1940)
- Ballpark: Bosse Field (1938–1942, 1946–1957)

The Evansville Braves was the primary nickname of a minor league baseball team based in Evansville, Indiana 1938–1942 and 1946–1957, playing in the Illinois-Indiana-Iowa League. Baseball Hall of Fame Inductees Bob Uecker and Warren Spahn played for Evansville during this era.

== History ==
The Evansville Bees and Braves played the Class B Illinois–Indiana–Iowa League (the "Three-I" League) from 1938 to 1957, interrupted when the league ceased play during World War II. They played home games at Bosse Field, which is currently the third oldest baseball stadium in regular use in the United States.

Evansville of the Three-I League had a single affiliation with the Major League Braves franchise, playing as affiliates of the Boston Bees (1938–1940), Boston Braves (1941–1942 and 1946–1952) and the Milwaukee Braves (1953–1957). The Evansville Bees (1938–1940) took their name when the Boston Braves changed their nickname to the Bees for a few seasons.

The team ceased after the 1957 season and Evansville was without baseball until the Evansville White Sox began play in the Class AA Southern League in 1966. Today, Evansville and Bosse Field are home to the Frontier League's Evansville Otters.

1956 Evansville Braves.

== The ballpark ==
The franchise played at Bosse Field. Bosse Field was built in 1915 and had a capacity of 7,200 during the Braves era. Bosse Field is still in use today, serving as the home park for the Evansville Otters of the Frontier League. Next to Fenway Park (1912) and Wrigley Field (1914), Memorial Stadium in the third oldest professional park in existence, opening on June 17, 1915. Bosse Field is located at 1701 Main Street & Morgan Street, Evansville, Indiana.

== Championships ==
- The franchise won four Illinois–Indiana–Iowa League Championships: 1946, 1948, 1956 and 1957.

== Major League Affiliations ==
- 1938–1942; 1946–1952, Boston Braves/Bees
- 1953–1957, Milwaukee Braves

== Notable alumni ==
=== Baseball Hall of Fame alumni ===
- Warren Spahn (1941) Inducted, 1973
- Bob Uecker (1957) Ford C. Frick Award, 2003

=== Notable alumni ===
- Claud Raymond (1957) MLB All-Star
- Lee Maye (1955–1956)
- Jim Frey (1951–1952)
- Del Crandall (1949) MLB All-Star
- Dick Donovan (1948) MLB All-Star
- Chuck Tanner (1946) Manager: 1979 World Series Champion - Pittsburgh Pirates

== Year-by-year record ==
Year	Record	Finish	Manager	Playoffs
1946	68-51	3rd	Bob Coleman	League Champs
1947	70-55	5th	Bob Coleman	NA
1948	67-54	3rd	Bob Coleman	League Champs
1949	74-51	1st	Bob Coleman	Lost League Finals
1950	56-70	6th	Ernie White	NA
1951	69-60	2nd	Bob Coleman	Lost in 1st round
1952	74-47	1st	Bob Coleman	Lost League Finals
1953	70-59	3rd	Bob Coleman	Lost League Finals
1954	81-54	1st	Bob Coleman	Lost in 1st round
1955	60-66	5th	Bob Coleman	NA
1956	84-36	1st	Bob Coleman	League Champs
1957	81-49	1st	Bob Coleman	League Champs
