= Nelson Burbrink =

American baseball player (1921–2001)

- Catcher
- Born: December 28, 1921; Cincinnati, Ohio, U.S.
- Died: April 12, 2001 (aged 79); Largo, Florida, U.S.
- Batted: Right Threw: Right

MLB debut
- June 5, 1955, for the St. Louis Cardinals

Last MLB appearance
- September 21, 1955, for the St. Louis Cardinals

MLB statistics
- Batting average: .276
- Home runs: 0
- Runs batted in: 15
- Stats at Baseball Reference

Teams
- St. Louis Cardinals (1955)

Nelson Edward Burbrink (December 28, 1921 – April 12, 2001) was an American professional baseball player and scout. A native of Cincinnati, Ohio, he was signed by the Chicago Cubs as an amateur free agent before the 1941 season and served in the United States Navy during World War II. After almost a dozen years playing in the minor leagues, Burbrink finally made it to Major League Baseball at the age of 33 with the St. Louis Cardinals.

After being called up to the big leagues in June 1955, Burbrink shared catching duties with teammate Bill Sarni for the remainder of the season. He made his major league debut on June 5 during a doubleheader against the Brooklyn Dodgers at Ebbets Field. He appeared in 58 games for St. Louis, going 47-for-170 (.276) with eight doubles, one triple, no home runs, 15 runs batted in, and 11 runs scored. He had a .333 on-base percentage and a slugging percentage of .335.

Defensively, he recorded 261 putouts, 24 assists, six errors, and participated in four double plays. His fielding percentage was .979, slightly under the league average that season.

After his playing career ended, Burbrink scouted for the Cardinals, New York Mets and Milwaukee Brewers. He served as the Mets' scouting director (1968–72) and director of player development (1973–78).

Burbrink died of cancer in Largo, Florida, at the age of 79.
