= Walter Holke =

American baseball player (1892–1954)

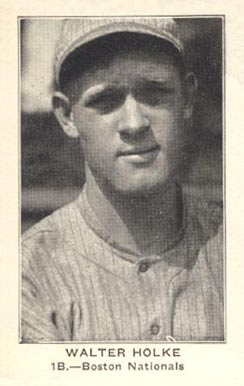
- First baseman
- Born: December 25, 1892; St. Louis, Missouri, U.S.
- Died: October 12, 1954 (aged 61); St. Louis, Missouri, U.S.
- Batted: Both Threw: Left

MLB debut
- October 6, 1914, for the New York Giants

Last MLB appearance
- September 23, 1925, for the Cincinnati Reds

MLB statistics
- Batting average: .287
- Home runs: 24
- Runs batted in: 486
- Stats at Baseball Reference

Teams
- New York Giants (1914, 1916–1918); Boston Braves (1919–1922); Philadelphia Phillies (1923–1925); Cincinnati Reds (1925)

Walter Henry Holke (December 25, 1892 – October 12, 1954) was an American first baseman in Major League Baseball. He played for the New York Giants, Boston Braves, Philadelphia Phillies, and Cincinnati Reds. Holke holds the record for the most put-outs by an infielder in a game, with 46 during a 26-inning game between the Braves and the Brooklyn Dodgers on May 1, 1920.

Holke played for the Giants in the 1917 World Series against the Chicago White Sox. His double drove in the first run of Game 3 at the Polo Grounds, which the Giants won 2–0. He batted .286 (6-for-21) with 2 runs and 1 RBI.

In 1923, his first season playing for the Philadelphia Phillies, Holke had a career-high 175 hits and a batting average of .311. He finished his career two years later with a total of 1,278 hits.

In 1,212 games over 11 seasons, Holke posted a .287 batting average (1,278-for-4,456) with 464 runs, 24 home runs and 486 RBI. He finished his career with a .993 fielding percentage.
