= Skeeter Newsome =

American baseball player (1910–1989)

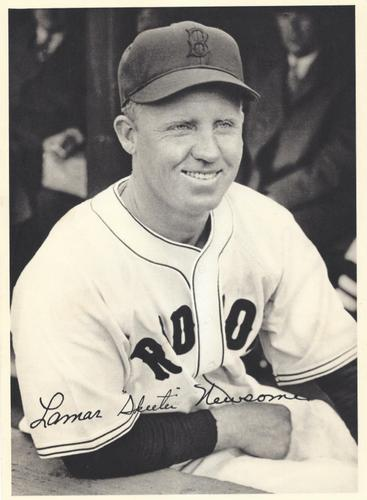
- Shortstop
- Born: October 18, 1910; Phenix City, Alabama, U.S.
- Died: August 31, 1989 (aged 78); Columbus, Georgia, U.S.
- Batted: Right Threw: Right

MLB debut
- April 19, 1935, for the Philadelphia Athletics

Last MLB appearance
- September 17, 1947, for the Philadelphia Phillies

MLB statistics
- Batting average: .245
- Home runs: 9
- Runs batted in: 292
- Stats at Baseball Reference

Teams
- Philadelphia Athletics (1935–1939); Boston Red Sox (1941–1945); Philadelphia Phillies (1946–1947)

Lamar Ashby "Skeeter" Newsome (October 18, 1910 – August 31, 1989) was an American professional baseball shortstop. He played in Major League Baseball (MLB) for the Philadelphia Athletics (1935–1939), Boston Red Sox (1941–1945) and Philadelphia Phillies (1946–1947).

Born in Phenix City, Alabama, he finished 27th in voting for the 1943 American League MVP Award after playing in 114 games and having 449 at-bats, 48 runs, 119 hits, 21 doubles, 2 triples, 1 home run, 22 RBI, 5 stolen bases, 21 walks, .265 batting average, .301 on-base percentage, .327 slugging percentage, 147 total bases and 8 sacrifice hits.

He finished 32nd in voting for the 1945 AL MVP for playing in 125 games and having 438 at-bats, 45 runs, 127 hits, 30 doubles, 1 triple, 1 home run, 48 RBI, 6 stolen bases, 20 walks, .290 batting average, .322 on-base percentage, .370 slugging percentage, 162 total bases and 17 sacrifice hits.

In 12 seasons he played in 1,128 games and had 3,716 at-bats, 381 runs, 910 hits, 164 doubles, 15 triples, 9 home runs, 292 RBI, 67 stolen bases, 246 walks, .245 batting average, .293 on-base percentage, .304 slugging percentage, 1,131 total bases and 120 sacrifice hits.

Newsome managed in the minor leagues for the Phillies and Detroit Tigers after his playing career ended until 1960. He then became an account executive for WTVM Channel 9 in Columbus, Ohio. He was married and had four children. Nine months prior to his death, he was suffering from prostate cancer. He died in Columbus, Georgia on August 31, 1989 at the age of 78.
