= Ira Hutchinson =

American baseball player (1910–1973)

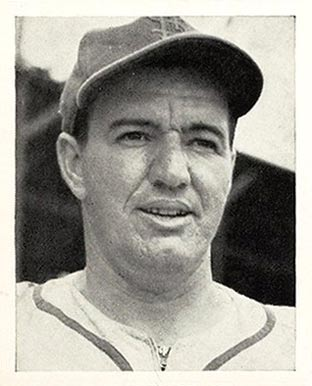
- Pitcher
- Born: August 31, 1910; Chicago, Illinois, U.S.
- Died: August 21, 1973 (aged 62); Chicago, Illinois, U.S.
- Batted: Right Threw: Right

MLB debut
- September 24, 1933, for the Chicago White Sox

Last MLB appearance
- July 19, 1945, for the Boston Braves

MLB statistics
- Win–loss record: 34–33
- Earned run average: 3.76
- Strikeouts: 179
- Stats at Baseball Reference

Teams
- Chicago White Sox (1933); Boston Bees (1937–1938); Brooklyn Dodgers (1939); St. Louis Cardinals (1940–1941); Boston Braves (1944–1945)

Ira Kendall Hutchinson (August 31, 1910 – August 21, 1973) was an American right-handed pitcher in Major League Baseball who appeared in 209 games pitched over all or parts of eight seasons between 1933 and 1945. Born in Chicago, he was later a manager in the Chicago White Sox minor league system from 1951 to 1970.

Hutchinson made one appearance in late September 1933 for the White Sox, then did not return to the Major Leagues until 1936. He pitched for the Boston Bees, as the Braves had been renamed from 1936 to 1940. Hutchinson's best season for Boston came in 1938, when he posted a 9–8 record that included four complete games. He also pitched for the Brooklyn Dodgers and St. Louis Cardinals, and returned to Braves at the end of his MLB career in 1944–45. His minor league pitching career continued through 1949.

In 18 seasons of managing in the minors, Hutchinson's teams won 1,168 games. His managerial career concluded with the 1970 Appleton Foxes of the Midwest League, his team that season including future big leaguers like Goose Gossage, Terry Forster and Bucky Dent.
