= Springfield Senators =

- 1889–1935

Minor league affiliations
- League: Central Interstate League (1889); Three-I League (1904-1912, 1925–1932, 1935); Mississippi Valley League (1933)

Major league affiliations
- Team: St. Louis Cardinals (1933); Detroit Tigers (1935)

The Springfield Senators were a minor league baseball team based in Springfield, Illinois that played on-and-off from 1889 to 1935. The team played in the Central Interstate League (1889), the Three-I League (1904-1912, 1925–1932, 1935) and the Mississippi Valley League (1933). In 1933, the club was affiliated with the St. Louis Cardinals. In 1935, it was affiliated with the Detroit Tigers.

The 1889 team played as the Springfield Senators. In 1903, the team was called the Springfield Foot Trackers and in 1904, they played as the Springfield Hustlers. From 1905 to 1912 the team played as the Springfield Senators. During the 1913 and 1914 season the team played as the Springfield Watchmakers and disbanded. Starting in 1925 through 1932, the team played again as the Springfield Senators. The team name in both the 1933 and 1935 seasons was the Springfield Senators and the team again disbanded.

Many notable players spent time with the team. Baseball Hall of Famer Joe McGinnity, as well as Heinie Groh, Joe Kuhel, Larry Doyle, Ray Chapman, Dutch Leonard, Bill Wambsganss, Birdie Tebbetts and Roy Cullenbine are among them.
