= Central League (1900) =

Defunct American baseball league

- Most recent season or competition: 1951 Central League season
- Classification: Independent (1900); Class B 1903–1917, 1920–1922, 1928–1930, 1932, 1934; Class C 1926; Class A 1948–1951
- Sport: Minor League Baseball
- First season: 1900
- Folded: 1951
- President: William F.H. Schmidt (1900); George W. Bement (1903-1904); Frank R. Carson (1905-1911); Louie Heilbroner (1912-1915); Emerson Dickerson (1916-1917); Harry W. Stahlhefer (1917); Emerson Dickerson (1921-1926); L.J. Wylie (1928-1929); Donald C. Jacobs (1930); Frederick Howell (1932); Emerson Dickerson (1934); Thomas J. Halligan (1948-1951)
- No. of teams: 37
- Country: United States of America
- Most titles: 5 Dayton
- Related competitions: Central League (1888); Central League (1897)

The Central League was a low-level minor league baseball league that operated sporadically in 1900, from 1903–1917, 1920–1922, 1926, 1928–1930, 1934, and 1948–1951. In 1926, the league merged mid-season with the Michigan State League and played under that name for the remainder of the season. The Central League later reformed in 1928.

The Central League hosted teams from 37 cities over its six decades of league play. Teams from the states of Indiana, Illinois, Michigan, Ohio, Pennsylvania and West Virginia were represented.

== Minor League class history ==
Before the current minor league baseball classification system was introduced in 1963, minor leagues/teams were classified from Class D up to Class Triple-A. The following is a list of the various classifications that the Central League had during its years of operation:

- Class B: 1903–1917, 1920–1922, 1928–1930, 1932, 1934
- Class C: 1926
- Class A: 1948–1951

== Cities represented ==
The following are cities and former teams that made up the Central League.

- Akron, Ohio: Akron Rubbermen 1912; Akron Tyrites 1928–1929, 1932
- Anderson, IN: Anderson Orphans 1903
- Bloomington, IL: Bloomington Blues 1900
- Canton, Ohio: Canton Red Stockings 1905; Canton Chinamen 1906–1907; Canton Statesmen 1912; Canton Terriers 1928–1930, 1932
- Charleston, WV: Charleston Senators 1949–1951
- Danville, IL: Danville Champions 1900
- Dayton, Ohio: Dayton Veterans 1903–1917; Dayton Aviators 1928–1930; Dayton Ducks 1932; Dayton Indians 1948–1951
- Decatur, IL: Decatur Commodores 1900
- Erie, PA: Erie Sailors 1912, 1915, 1928–1930, 1932
- Evansville, IN: Evansville River Rats 1903–1910, 1913–1915; Evansville Strikers 1911; Evansville Evas 1916–1917
- Flint, MI: Flint Arrows, 1948–1951
- Fort Wayne, IN: Fort Wayne Railroaders 1903–1905; Fort Wayne Billikens 1908–1910; Fort Wayne Brakies 1911; Fort Wayne Railroaders 1912, Fort Wayne Champs 1913; Fort Wayne Railroaders 1914; Fort Wayne Cubs 1915; Fort Wayne Chiefs 1917, 1928–1930, 1932, 1934; Fort Wayne Generals 1948
- Grand Rapids, MI: Grand Rapids Orphans 1903–1905; Grand Rapids Wolverines 1906–1909; Grand Rapids Raiders 1910 Grand Rapids Furniture Makers 1911; Grand Rapids Grads 1911; Grand Rapids Bill-eds 1913; Grand Rapids Black Sox 1912, Grand Rapids Champs 1914 Grand Rapids Black Sox 1915–1917; Grand Rapids Joshers 1920–1921; Grand Rapids Billbobs 1922; Grand Rapids Black Sox 1926; Grand Rapids Tigers 1934; Grand Rapids Jets 1948–1951
- Ionia, MI: Ionia Mayors 1921–1922
- Jackson, MI: Jackson Mayors 1921
- Jacksonville, IL: Jacksonville Reds 1900
- Kalamazoo, MI: Kalamazoo Celery Pickers 1920–1922, 1926
- Lansing, MI: Lansing Senators 1921–1922
- Lima, OH: Lima Buckeyes 1934
- Lansing, MI: Ludington Mariners 1920–1922
- Ludington, MI: Ludington Tars 1926
- Marion, OH: Marion Oilworkers 1903–1904
- Muskegon, MI: Muskegon Reds 1916; Muskegon Muskies 1920–1922; Muskegon Reds 1926, 1934; Muskegon Clippers 1948–1950; Muskegon Reds 1951
- Newark, Ohio: Newark Skeeters 1911
- Peoria, IL: Peoria Distillers 1900, 1904, 1917; Peoria Tractors 1934
- Richmond, IN: Richmond Quakers 1917; Richmond Roses 1930
- Saginaw, MI: Saginaw Bears 1948-1950; Saginaw Jacks 1951
- South Bend, IN: South Bend Greens 1903–1909 South Bend Bronchos 1910; South Bend Bux 1911; South Bend Benders 1911, South Bend Benders 1912, 1916–1917; South Bend Twins 1932
- Springfield, IL: Springfield 1900; Springfield Red Birds 1934
- Springfield, Ohio: Springfield Babes 1905-1907; Springfield Reapers 1912–1914, 1916–1917; Springfield Buckeyes 1928; Springfield Dunnmen 1929; Springfield Blue Sox 1930
- Terre Haute, IN: Terre Haute Hottentots 1900, 1903–1909; Terre Haute Stags 1910; Terre Haute Miners 1911; Terre Haute Terre-iers 1912–1914; Terre Haute Highlanders 1915–1916
- Wheeling, WV: Wheeling Stogies 1903–1912, 1915–1916
- Youngstown, Ohio: Youngstown Steelmen 1912; Youngstown Buckeyes 1932
- Zanesville, Ohio: Zanesville Infants 1908–1909; Zanesville Potters 1910–1912

== Standings & statistics ==
1900 Central League

1900 Team standings	W	L	PCT	GB	Managers
Bloomington Blues	64	34	.653	-	George Reed
Danville Champions	57	44	.564	8½	Charles Leverenz
Decatur Commodores	46	51	.474	17½	Frank Weikart
Terre Haute Hottentots	48	61	.440	21½	Jap Poor / Roy Montgomery; Bill Krieg
Peoria Distillers	29	25	.537	NA	Alfred Lawson / Bill Krieg
Springfield / Jacksonville Reds	15	43	.259	NA	Harry Wilson / W.D. Highfield; Jim Hackett

Peoria disbanded July 8; Springfield (4-14) transferred to Jacksonville May 21; Jacksonville disbanded July 8.
Playoffs: Danville defeated Bloomington

Player statistics
Player	Team	Stat	Tot
Red Wright	Danville	BA	.329
Fred Abbott	Danville	Runs	91
Charles Elsey; Red Wright	Bloomington; Danville	Hits	130
Frank Huelsman	Peoria/Danville	HR	5
Clarence Jessup	Terre Haute	SB	32

== 1903 to 1917 ==
1903 Central League

1903 Team standings	W	L	PCT	GB	Managers
Fort Wayne Railroaders	89	49	.645	-	Bade Myers
South Bend Green Stockings	88	50	.638	1	Angus Grant
Marion Oilworkers	71	65	.522	17	John Grim
Wheeling Stogies	69	68	.504	19½	Barley Kain / Ted Price
Evansville River Rats	64	68	.485	22	Tom News / Thomas McKinley; Ed Ashenbach
Dayton Veterans	61	76	.445	27½	Henry Youngman
Terre Haute Hottentots	58	80	.420	31	Lou Walters / Peter Somers; William M. James; Ed Biecher
Anderson / Grand Rapids Orphans	58	92	.343	42	McVey Lindsey

Anderson (15-12) moved to Grand Rapids May 30

Player statistics
Player	Team	Stat	Tot
Jack Bonner	Evansville	BA	.329
Ed Coffee	South Bend	Runs	105
Jack Bonner	Evansville	Hits	172

1904 Central League

1904 Team standings	W	L	PCT	GB	Managers
Fort Wayne Railroaders	87	51	.630	-	Bade Myers
Terre Haute Hottentots	77	62	.554	10½	Frank Warrender
South Bend Greens	75	65	.536	13	Angus Grant
Wheeling Stogies	71	66	.518	15½	Ted Price
Dayton Veterans	68	69	.496	18½	John Spaatz / Charles Jewell; Hub Knoll
Marion Oilworkers / Peoria Distillers	61	75	.449	25	John Grim / Mike Lawrence
Grand Rapids Wolverines	58	82	.414	30	John Flannery / John Morrissey
Evansville River Rats	56	83	.403	31½	Frank Schoeller / Robert Berryhill; Frank Cross

Marion (12-15) moved to Peoria (27-33) May 30; Peoria returned to Marion July 31; Evansville disbanded September 6

Player statistics
Player	Team	Stat	Tot	Player	Team	Stat	Tot
Charles Cogswell	South Bend	BA	.354	Cy Alberts	Fort Wayne	W	22
Bert Dennis	Fort Wayne	Runs	92	Elmer Moffit	South Bend	SO	233
[John Geyer	Grand Rapids	Hits	165	William Pearson	Grand Rapids/Dayton	PCT	.714 20-8
George McConnell; Dick Knox	Wheeling; Evansville	HR	9				

1905 Central League

1905 Team standings	W	L	PCT	GB	Managers
Wheeling Stogies	81	55	.596	-	Pop Schriver
Grand Rapids Orphans	75	59	.560	5	John Ganzel
South Bend Greens	77	62	.554	5½	Angus Grant
Evansville River Rats	71	67	.522	11½	Jimmy Ryan
Dayton Veterans	70	64	.514	10	Hub Knoll
Springfield Babes	66	68	.493	14	Jack Hendricks
Fort Wayne Railroaders; Canton Red Stockings	56	79	.415	24½	Bade Myers / George Williams
Terre Haute Hottentots	47	89	.345	34	Frank Warrender / Bert Dennis

Fort Wayne (31-41) moved to Canton July 10

Player statistics
Player	Team	Stat	Tot	Player	Team	Stat	Tot
John Connors	South Bend	BA	.338	Walt Miller	Grand Rapids	W	24
John Connors	South Bend	Runs	96	Elmer Moffit; George Miller	South Bend; Wheeling	PCT	.677 21-10
John Connors	South Bend	Hits	184				
Jimmy Ryan	Evansville	HR	10				

1906 Central League
1906 - schedule

1906 Team standings	W	L	PCT	GB	Managers
Grand Rapids Wolverines	99	52	.656	-	John Ganzel
Springfield Babes	91	60	.603	8	Jack Hendricks
Canton Chinamen	85	63	.574	12½	Bade Myers
Dayton Veterans	78	71	.523	20	John Thornton / James Barrett; Hub Knoll / McKinley / Ed McLean
Wheeling Stogies	75	77	.493	24½	Pop Schriver
Evansville River Rats	65	82	.442	32	Jimmy Ryan / John Walker; Harry Stahlhefer
South Bend Greens	62	88	.413	36½	Angus Grant
Terre Haute Hottentots	44	106	.293	54½	Jack Boyle / Frank Warrender

Player statistics
Player	Team	Stat	Tot	Player	Team	Stat	Tot
John Ganzel	Grand Rapids	BA	.323	Ralph Willis	Canton	W	27
Goat Anderson	South Bend	Runs	100	James Freeman	Evansville	SO	214
Goat Anderson	South Bend	Hits	169	Roy Hale	Dayton	PCT	.856 12-2
John Ganzel	Grand Rapids	HR	13				

1907 Central League

1907 Team standings	W	L	PCT	GB	Managers
Springfield Babes	86	49	.637	-	Jack Hendricks
Wheeling Stogies	77	57	.575	8½	Ted Price
Canton Chinamen	69	64	.519	16	Bade Myers
Evansville River Rats	69	69	.500	18½	Punch Knoll
Dayton Veterans	66	71	.482	21	Ed McKean / E. Richardson; Mal Kittridge
Terre Haute Hottentots	65	72	.474	22	Jack McConnell / Don Cameron
Grand Rapids Wolverines	60	77	.438	27	Cuppy Groeschow / Elmer Bliss
South Bend Greens	53	86	.381	35	Angus Grant

Player statistics
Player	Team	Stat	Tot	Player	Team	Stat	Tot
Champ Osteen	Springfield	BA	.338	Rube Marquard	Canton	W	23
Joe Collins	Springfield	Runs	96	Matt Muldowney	Springfield	PCT	.783 18-5
Champ Osteen	Springfield	Hits	170				
Larry Lejeune; Ike Francis; Bill Richardson	Springfield; Grand Rapids; Dayton	HR	7				

1908 Central League

1908 Team standings	W	L	PCT	GB	Managers
Evansville River Rats	84	56	.600	-	Punch Knoll
South Bend Greens	80	60	.571	4	Angus Grant
Dayton Veterans	77	63	.550	7	Bade Myers
Fort Wayne Billikens	75	65	.536	9	Jack Hendricks
Grand Rapids Wolverines	68	71	.489	16½	Bobby Lowe
Zanesville Infants	67	73	.479	17	Marty Hogan
Terre Haute Hottentots	63	75	.457	20	Lew Drill
Wheeling Stogies	44	95	.317	39½	Ted Price / Tom Fleming

Player statistics
Player	Team	Stat	Tot	Player	Team	Stat	Tot
Charles French	Evansville	BA	.339	Charles Wacke	Evansville	W	27
Bert Noblett	Grand Rapids	Runs	92	John Rowan	Dayton	SO	232
Charles French	Evansville	Hits	170	Charles Wacker	Evansville	PCT	.771 27-8
Punch Knoll	Evansville	HR	12				
Midge Craven	South Bend	SB	87				

1909 Central League

1909 Team standings	W	L	PCT	GB	Managers
Wheeling Stogies	83	50	.624	-	Bill Phillips
Zanesville Infants	75	58	.564	8	Roy Montgomery
Fort Wayne Billikens	71	66	.518	14	Jack Hendricks
Grand Rapids Wolverines	67	65	.508	15½	Joe Raidy
Terre Haute Hottentots	65	73	.471	20½	Cuppy Groeschow
South Bend Greens	64	72	.471	20½	Angus Grant
Evansville River Rats	58	78	.426	26½	Punch Knoll
Dayton Veterans	56	77	.421	27	Bade Myers

Player statistics
Player	Team	Stat	Tot	Player	Team	Stat	Tot
Arista DeHaven	Terre Haute	BA	.336	John Fisher; Bill Kenworthy	Wheeling; Zanesville	W	24
Curley Blount	Fort Wayne	Runs	92	Bucky O'Brien	Evansville	SO	180
Arista DeHaven	Terre Haute	Hits	173	Bill Phillips	Wheeling	PCT	.800 12-3
Punch Knoll; Hank Butcher	Evansville	HR	11				

1910 Central League

1910 Team standings	W	L	PCT	GB	Managers
South Bend Bronchos	88	50	.638	-	Ed Wheeler / Midge Craven
Fort Wayne Billikens	79	58	.577	8½	Jimmy Burke
Dayton Veterans	74	63	.540	13½	Punch Knoll
Evansville River Rats	70	67	.511	17½	Angus Grant
Terre Haute Stags	63	74	.460	24½	Cuppy Groeschow
Zanesville Potters	61	76	.445	26½	Roy Montgomery
Grand Rapids Raiders	60	77	.438	27½	Joe Raidy
Wheeling Stogies	52	82	.388	34	Bill Phillips

Player statistics
Player	Team	Stat	Tot	Player	Team	Stat	Tot
Larry LeJeune	Evansville	BA	.328	Buck Sterzer	Evansville	W	28
Larry LeJeune	Evansville	Runs	81	Walt Justis	Dayton	SO	177
Del Young	Fort Wayne	Hits	166	William Robertson	Fort Wayne	PCT	.800 20-5
Larry LeJeune	Evansville	HR	18				

1911 Central League

1911 Team standings	W	L	PCT	GB	Managers
Dayton Veterans	86	51	.628	-	Punch Knoll
Fort Wayne Brakies	83	54	.606	3	Doc Casey
Zanesville Potters	74	58	.561	9½	Joe Raidy
South Bend Benders / Grand Rapids Grads	73	61	.545	11½	Ed Smith
Evansville Strikers / South Bend Bux	62	72	.463	22½	Angus Grant / Harry Arndt
Wheeling Stogies	56	73	.434	26	Roy Montgomery
Grand Rapids Furniture Makers / Newark Skeeters	59	78	.431	27	Doc Parker / John Pendry
Terre Haute Miners	45	91	.331	40½	Ed Wheeler / Angus Grant; Jock Somerlott

Grand Rapids (25-36) moved to Newark June 27; South Bend (42-36) moved to Grand Rapids July 13; Evansville (54-54) moved to South Bend August 11

Player statistics
Player	Team	Stat	Tot	Player	Team	Stat	Tot
Joe Connelly	Zanesville/Terre Haute	BA	.355	Jack Compton; George Harden	Dayton; Fort Wayne	W	22
Ed Justice; Marion Kilpatrick	Fort Wayne; Dayton	Runs	96	George Harden	Fort Wayne	SO	172
Ray Spencer	Dayton	Hits	176	Charles Alberts	Fort Wayne	PCT	.800 16-4
Albert Durham; Punch Knoll; Hubert Hadley; Emil Grefe	Wheeling; Dayton; Evansville/South Bend; Evansville/South Bend	HR	11				

1912 Central League

1912 Team standings	W	L	PCT	GB	Managers
Fort Wayne Railroaders	77	52	.597	-	Frank Shaughnessey
Youngstown Steelmen	74	54	.577	2½	Bill Phillips
Erie Sailors	75	55	.577	2½	Billy Gilbert
Springfield Reapers	72	54	.571	3½	Charley O'Day / Jack Pendry
Dayton Veterans	73	56	.565	4	Punch Knoll
Wheeling Stogies	66	61	.520	10	Goat Anderson
Canton Statesmen	64	66	.492	13½	Ed Gremlinger
Akron Rubbermen	59	68	.465	17	Lee Fohl
Grand Rapids Black Sox	58	68	.460	17½	Ed Smith / Bert Annis
Terre Haute Terre-iers	59	70	.457	18	Angus Grant / John Nee
Zanesville Potters	52	78	.400	25½	Willus Kelley / John Pendry; Martin Hogan
South Bend Benders	41	88	.318	36	Harry Arndt

Player statistics
Player	Team	Stat	Tot	Player	Team	Stat	Tot
Larry LeJeune	Grand Rapids	BA	.361	Buck Sterzer	Erie	W	24
Frank Gilhooley	Erie	Runs	104	Earl Moseley	Youngstown	SO	235
Larry LeJeune	Grand Rapids	Hits	168	Fred Sherry; Lou Schettler; Ted Goulait	Youngstown; Erie; Springfield	PCT	.769 10-3
Larry LeJeune	Grand Rapids	HR	25				

1913 Central League
1913 - schedule

1913 Team standings	W	L	PCT	GB	Managers
Grand Rapids Bill-eds	92	48	.657	-	Ed Smith
Fort Wayne Champs	77	63	.550	15	Jimmy Burke
Springfield Reapers	67	71	.486	24	Joe Stanley
Dayton Veterans	62	77	.446	29½	John Nee
Terre Haute Terre-iers	60	79	.432	31½	Goat Anderson
Evansville River Rats	60	80	.429	32	Punch Knoll

Player statistics
Player	Team	Stat	Tot	Player	Team	Stat	Tot
Larry LeJeune	Grand Rapids	BA	.346	Jeff Pfeffer	Grand Rapids	W	25
George Brautigan	Springfield	Runs	99	Jeff Pfeffer	Grand Rapids	SO	232
Pop Shaw	Dayton	Hits	175	Sherry Smith; William Riley	Grand Rapids	PCT	.818 9-2
Bill Keene	Springfield	HR	15				

1914 Central League

1914 Team standings	W	L	PCT	GB	Managers
Dayton Veterans	85	49	.634	-	John Nee
Evansville River Rats	73	54	.575	8½	Punch Knoll
Fort Wayne Railroaders	64	70	.478	21	Harry Martin
Terre Haute Terre-iers	61	71	.462	23	Larry Quinlan
Grand Rapids Champs	58	72	.446	25	George Hughes / James Jones
Springfield Reapers	42	67	.385	35½	Joe Stanley

Springfield disbanded August 8

Player statistics
Player	Team	Stat	Tot	Player	Team	Stat	Tot
Jack Sheehan	Terre Haute	BA	.340	Jake Fromholtz	Evansville	W	23
Arista DeHaven	Dayton	Runs	96	Paul Fittery	Evansville	SO	249
Jack Sheehan	Terre Haute	Hits	179	Paul Fittery	Evansville	PCT	.759 22-7
Howard Baker	Evansville	HR	15				

1915 Central League

1915 Team standings	W	L	PCT	GB	Managers
Evansville River Rats	72	50	.590	-	Punch Knoll
Grand Rapids Black Sox	68	54	.557	4	Bill Essick
Youngstown Steelmen	66	56	.541	6	Curley Blount
Terre Haute Highlanders	66	58	.532	7	Rufus Gilbert
Erie Sailors	64	58	.525	8	Larry Quinlan
Fort Wayne Cubs	62	60	.508	10	Bade Myers
Wheeling Stogies	50	76	.397	24	Pop Schriver / Arch Riley
Dayton Veterans	43	79	.352	29	Jack Compton

Player statistics
Player	Team	Stat	Tot	Player	Team	Stat	Tot
Tom Miller	Erie	BA	.336	Earl Ainsworth; Lou Schettler	Fort Wayne; Youngstown	W	24
Red Smyth	Fort Wayne	Runs	84	Art Nehf	Terre Haute	SO	218
Stump Edington	Grand Rapids	Hits	142	Art Nehf	Terre Haute	ERA	1.38
Fred Bratchie	Fort Wayne	HR	10				

1916 Central League

1916 Team standings	W	L	PCT	GB	Managers
Grand Rapids Black Sox	77	55	.583	-	Bill Essick
Dayton Veterans	73	57	.562	3	John Nee
Springfield Reapers	74	58	.561	3	Joe Dunn
Wheeling Stogies	65	64	.504	20½	Harry Smith
Evansville Evas	63	66	.488	22½	Punch Knoll
Terre Haute Highlanders	62	71	.466	25½	Rufus Gilbert
South Bend Benders	56	77	.421	31½	Ben Koehler / Lee Tannehill
Muskegon Reds	55	77	.417	32	Bade Myers

Grand Rapids played some games at Battle Creek, MI
Playoffs: Dayton 4 games, Springfield 2

Player statistics
Player	Team	Stat	Tot	Player	Team	Stat	Tot
Ray Spencer	Dayton	BA	.343	Nick Lakaff	Dayton	W	25
Ray Spencer	Dayton	Runs	84	Ted Turner	Evansville	SO	203
Ray Spencer	Dayton	Hits	170	Dixie McArthur	Grand Rapids	ERA	1.56
Earl Sykes	Dayton	HR	18	Socks Seibold	Wheeling	PCT	.739 17-6

1917 Central League

1917 Team standings	W	L	PCT	GB	Managers
Grand Rapids Black Sox	80	44	.645	-	Bill Essick
Springfield Reapers	74	50	.597	6	Joe Dunn
South Bend Benders / Peoria Distillers	66	55	.545	12½	Harry Smith / William Jackson
Muskegon Reds	65	57	.533	14	Jimmy Hamilton
Evansville Evas	56	61	.479	20½	Punch Knoll
Richmond Quakers	46	70	.397	30	Bade Myers / Joe Evers; Larry Gilbert
Dayton Veterans	44	68	.393	30	John Nee
Fort Wayne Chiefs	47	73	.392	31	Carl Vandagrift

South Bend (26-35) moved to Peoria July 8
Playoffs: Grand Rapids 4 games, Peoria 3

Player statistics
Player	Team	Stat	Tot	Player	Team	Stat	Tot
Frank Walker	Springfield	BA	.370	Paul Carpenter	Grand Rapids	W	23
Frank Walker	Springfield	Runs	94	Paul Wachtel	Muskegon	SO	176
Frank Walker	Springfield	Hits	161	Guy Hoffman	Peoria	PCT	.786 11-3
Frank Walker	Springfield	HR	10				

== 1920 to 1926 ==
1920 Central League
1920 - schedule

1920 Team standings	W	L	PCT	GB	Managers
Grand Rapids Joshers	76	50	.603	-	Josh Devore
Kalamazoo Celery Pickers	64	60	.516	11	Rube Vickers / George Tomer
Ludington Mariners	62	62	.500	13	Punch Knoll
Muskegon Muskies	47	77	.379	28	Doc White

Player statistics
Player	Team	Stat	Tot	Player	Team	Stat	Tot
Lance Richbourg	Grand Rapids	BA	.415	William Shoup	Ludington	W	20
Harry Carey	Grand Rapids	Runs	91	John Bogart	Ludington	SO	199
Davey Claire	Ludington	Hits	137	Frank Rose	Grand Rapids	PCT	.704 19-8
Vincent Tydeman	Ludington	HR	11				

1921 Central League

1921 Team standings	W	L	PCT	GB	Managers
Ludington Mariners	87	42	.674	-	James Sharp
Kalamazoo Celery Pickers	69	58	.543	16	George Tomer / Grover Prough
Lansing Senators	65	63	.508	21½	Newt Hunter
Muskegon Muskies	63	67	.485	24½	Davey Claire
Grand Rapids Joshers	59	71	.454	28½	Josh Devore / Louis Wolfe
Jackson Mayors / Ionia Mayors	44	86	.338	43½	Dan Jenkins / Bill Hartwell

Jackson (27-45) moved to Ionia July 20

Player statistics
Player	Team	Stat	Tot	Player	Team	Stat	Tot
Harry Purcell	Jackson/Ionia	BA	.380	William Shoup	Ludington	W	25
Joe Napier	Ludington	Runs	112	Lawrence Reno	Lansing	SO	133
Harry Purcell	Jackson/Ionia	Hits	176	William Shoup	Ludington	ERA	2.71
Grover Prough	Kalamazoo	RBI	97	Clarence Brown	Ludington	PCT	.758 22-7
Joseph Hamel	Ludington	HR	21				

1922 Central League

1922 Team standings	W	L	PCT	GB	Managers
Ludington Mariners	77	53	.592	-	Amby McConnell / Andy Woehrs
Grand Rapids Billbobs	73	55	.570	3½	Bobby Wells
Muskegon Muskies	67	62	.519	9½	Danny Claire / Carrington Sweeney
Kalamazoo Celery Pickers	61	67	.477	15	Grover Prough
Lansing Senators	60	67	.472	15½	Newt Hunter
Ionia Mayors	47	81	.367	29	Carrington Sweeney / Ray Dunn; William Wilcox

Playoffs: Grand Rapids 5 games, Ludington 3

Player statistics
Player	Team	Stat	Tot	Player	Team	Stat	Tot
Leo Payne	Grand Rapids	BA	.370	Oscar Johnson	Ludington	W	25
Howard Pennington	Grand Rapids	Runs	109	Wilcy Moore	Grand Rapids	SO	158
Harry Schwab	Ludington	Hits	190	Wilcy Moore	Grand Rapids	ERA	1.92
Charles Miller	Lansing	HR	12	Oscar Johnson	Ludington	PCT	.758 25-8

1926 Central League

1926 Team standings	W	L	PCT	GB	Managers
Kalamazoo Celery Pickers	16	8	.667	-	Boss Schmidt
Ludington Tars	12	12	.500	4	Ovid Nicholson
Muskegon Reds	12	13	.480	4½	Buck Wheat
Grand Rapids Black Sox	10	17	.370	9	Jess Runser / John Devereaux

League merged with the Michigan-Ontario League to form the Michigan State League, which began play June 15

Player statistics
Player	Team	Stat	Tot	Player	Team	Stat	Tot
Stanley Sykes	Muskegon	BA	.391	Frank Negake; John Oravetz	Ludington; Muskegon	W	5
Harry Harding	Kalamazoo	Runs	25	Victor Ferretti	Ludington	SO	30
Harry Harding	Kalamazoo	Hits	34	Harvey Freeman; Fred Hutton	Kalamazoo	PCT	1.000 4-0
Eddie Radtke	Ludington	HR	4				

== 1928 to 1930, 1932, 1934 ==
1928 Central League
1928 - schedule

1928 Team Standings	W	L	PCT	GB	Managers
Erie Sailors	79	59	.563	-	Buzz Wetzel
Dayton Aviators	76	59	.563	-	Everett Booe
Fort Wayne Chiefs	72	62	.537	3½	Punch Knoll
Akron Tyrites	67	65	.508	9½	John McCloskey
Springfield Buckeyes	67	66	.504	10	Joseph Dunn
Canton Terriers	43	90	.323	33	Joe Agler / Dan O'Leary

Playoffs: Fort Wayne 4 games, Erie 2

Player statistics
Player	Team	Stat	Tot	Player	Team	Stat	Tot
James Jordan	Dayton	BA	.362	Alex McColl; Bert Grimm	Akron	W	19
James Jordan	Dayton	Runs	130	Edgar Clough	Dayton	SO	130
James Jordan	Dayton	Hits	212	Alex McColl	Akron	ERA	2.73
James Jordan	Dayton	HR	27	Marvin Gudat	Dayton	PCT	.727 16-6

1929 Central League
1929 - schedule

1929 Team standings	W	L	PCT	GB	Managers
Canton Terriers	80	58	.580	-	James Hamilton
Erie Sailors	78	61	.561	2½	Jocko Munch
Dayton Aviators	68	69	.496	11½	Merito Acosta
Fort Wayne Chiefs	68	70	.493	12	Everett Booe
Springfield Dunnmen	59	77	.434	20	Joseph Dunn
Akron Tyrites	58	76	.433	21	John McCloskey

Player statistics
Player	Team	Stat	Tot	Player	Team	Stat	Tot
Charles Hostetler	Akron	BA	.360	Axel Lindstrom	Canton	W	24
Ken Hogan	Erie	Runs	125	Carl Schoof	Erie	SO	120
John Reider	Fort Wayne	Hits	185	Fred Pipgras	Canton	ERA	2.51
John Reider	Fort Wayne	RBI	134	Earle Browne	Dayton	PCT	.773 17-5
Tripp Sigman	Canton	HR	41				

1930 Central League
1930 - schedule

1930 Team standings	W	L	PCT	GB	Managers
Springfield Blue Sox	82	55	.599	-	Joseph Dunn
Erie Sailors	76	63	.547	7	Jocko Munch
Fort Wayne Chiefs	72	67	.518	11	Punch Knoll
Canton Terriers	65	73	.471	17½	Heine Groh
Richmond Roses	63	75	.457	19½	John McCloskey
Dayton Aviators	56	81	.409	26	Norman Cullop

Player statistics
Player	Team	Stat	Tot	Player	Team	Stat	Tot
Pat Wright	Fort Wayne	BA	.419	Robert Kline	Erie	W	23
Leroy Jones	Fort Wayne	Runs	162	Clyde Hatter	Dayton	SO	217
Pat Wright	Fort Wayne	Hits	228	Gus Goeckel	Springfield	ERA	3.14
Pat Wright	Fort Wayne	RBI	169	Gus Goeckel	Springfield	PCT	.792 19-5
Pat Wrigh	Fort Wayne	HR	52				

1932 Central League
1932 - schedule

1932 Team standings	W	L	PCT	GB	Managers
Erie Sailors	85	56	.603	-	Chief Bender / Bill McCorry
Fort Wayne Chiefs	77	60	.562	6	Bill Wambsganss
Dayton Ducks	77	64	.546	8	Ducky Holmes
Youngstown Buckeyes	70	69	.504	14	Tony Citrano
South Bend	29	57	.337	NA	Jess Altenburg / Clarence Roper; Whitey Belber
Akron Tyrites / Canton Terriers	28	60	.318	NA	John McCloskey / Roy Grimes

Akron (19-34) moved to Canton June 21; Canton disbanded July 21; South Bend disbanded July 21 Playoffs: Dayton 4 games, Fort Wayne 0

Player statistics
Player	Team	Stat	Tot	Player	Team	Stat	Tot
Babe Phelps	Youngstown	BA	.372	Marvin Duke	Erie	W	23
Pep Young	Erie	Runs	128	Marvin Duke	Erie	SO	176
Babe Phelps	Youngstown	Hits	199	Marvin Duke	Erie	ERA	2.36
Babe Phelps	Youngstown	HR	26	Marvin Duke	Erie	PCT	.852 23-4

1934 Central League

1934 Team standings	W	L	PCT	GB	Managers
Fort Wayne Chiefs	19	4	.826	-	Bill Burwell
Springfield Red Birds	14	12	.538	6½	Joe Mathes
Grand Rapids Tigers	11	13	.458	8½	Earl Wolgamot
Peoria Tractors	11	13	.458	8½	Frank Murphy
Muskegon Reds	4	9	.308	NA	Cy Boothby
Lima Buckeyes	0	8	.000	NA	Jess Orndorf

Lima disbanded May 26; Muskegon disbanded May 30; League disbanded June 10

Player statistics
Player	Team	Stat	Tot	Player	Team	Stat	Tot
Paul O'Malley	Grand Rapids	BA	.389	Allan Baringer	Fort Wayne	W	5
Ralph Rhein	Fort Wayne	Runs	26	Claude Passeau	Grand Rapids	SO	50
Ralph Rhein	Fort Wayne	Hits	37	Norm Jung	Fort Wayne	PCT	1.000 4-0
Ralph Rhein	Fort Wayne	HR	6				

== 1948 to 1951 ==
1948 Central League

1948 Team standings	W	L	PCT	GB	Managers
Flint Arrows	89	49	.645	-	Jack Tighe
Dayton Indians	84	55	.604	5½	Joe Vosmik
Muskegon Clippers	73	66	.525	16½	Bennie Huffman
Fort Wayne Generals	64	76	.457	26	Boom-Boom Beck
Saginaw Bears	55	85	.393	35	Robert Finley
Grand Rapids Jets	52	86	.377	37	Milton Galatzer / Jack Knight

Playoffs: Fort Wayne 3 games, Flint 2; Dayton 3 games, Muskegon 1
Finals: Dayton 4 games, Fort Wayne 2

Player statistics
Player	Team	Stat	Tot	Player	Team	Stat	Tot
Herb Conyers	Dayton	BA	.354	Charles Sipple	Dayton	W	18
Richard Lane	Muskegon	Runs	121	Bill Evans	Muskegon	SO	187
Louis Farotto	Saginaw	Hits	185	Alex Nedelco	Flint	ERA	2.08
Homer Johnson	Muskegon	RBI	109	William Morgan	Dayton	PCT	.765 13-4
Joe Morjoseph	Dayton	HR	31				

1949 Central League

1949 Team Standings	W	L	PCT	GB	Managers
Dayton Indians	80	57	.584	-	Oscar Melilo
Flint Arrows	77	62	.554	4	Jack Tighe
Grand Rapids Jets	70	66	.515	9½	Jack Knight
Charleston Senators	67	68	.496	12	Joe Beggs
Muskegon Reds	60	79	.432	21	Red Ruffing
Saginaw Bears	58	80	.420	22½	Bob Finley

Playoffs: Charleston 3 games, Dayton 1; Grand Rapids 3 games, Flint 2
Finals: Grand Rapids 4 games, Charleston 2

Player statistics
Player	Team	Stat	Tot	Player	Team	Stat	Tot
Bill Higdon	Muskegon	BA	.330	Charles Sipple	Dayton	W	19
Everett Robinson	Grand Rapids	Runs	91	Jose Santiago	Dayton	SO	233
Stuart Locklin	Dayton	Hits	169	Ernie Funk	Flint	ERA	2.13
Ron Bowen	Saginaw	RBI	123	Sanford Lambert	Grand Rapids	PCT	.800 12-3
Ron Bowen	Saginaw	HR	25				

1950 Central League

1950 Team standings	W	L	PCT	GB	Managers
Flint Arrows	80	53	.602	-	Gene Desautels
Muskegon Clippers	75	64	.540	8	Robert Finley
Dayton Indians	69	63	.523	10½	Dolph Camilli
Grand Rapids Jets	64	68	.485	15½	Jack Knight
Charleston Senators	58	73	.443	21	Joe Beggs
Saginaw Bears	56	81	.409	26	Hank Camelli

Playoffs: Flint 3 games, Grand Rapids 1; Muskegon 3 games, Dayton 2
Finals: Flint 4 games, Muskegon 1

Player statistics
Player	Team	Stat	Tot	Player	Team	Stat	Tot
Joe Rowell	Dayton	BA	.344	Ernie Funk	Flint	W	22
Louis Urcho	Muskegon	Runs	112	William Abernathie	Dayton	SO	171
Ron Bowen	Muskegon	Hits	169	Jimmy Wallace	Saginaw	ERA	2.05
Ron Bowen	Muskegon	RBI	128	James Vitter	Dayton	PCT	.800 12-3
Ron Bowen	Muskegon	HR	28				

1951 Central League

1951 Team standings	W	L	PCT	GB	Managers
Dayton Indians	87	50	.635	-	Jimmy Crandall
Muskegon Clippers	86	54	.614	2½	Jimmy Gleeson
Saginaw Jacks	79	58	.577	8	Bert Niehoff
Charleston Senators	69	70	.496	19	Ernie White
Grand Rapids Jets	53	82	.393	33	Jack Knight / Everett Robinson
Flint Arrows	38	98	.279	48½	Steve Bysco

Player statistics
Player	Team	Stat	Tot	Player	Team	Stat	Tot
Jim Greengrass	Muskegon	BA	.379	Emil Patrick	Muskegon	W	20
Ed Krage	Muskegon	Runs	128	Ryne Duren	Dayton	SO	238
Oscar Khederian	Saginaw	Hits	185	Calvin Howe	Grand Rapids	ERA	2.33
Ed Krage; Ron Bowen	Muskegon	RBI	114	Bob Freels	Dayton	PCT	.773 17-5
Ed Krage	Muskegon	HR	31				
