= Muskegon Muskies =

- 1917–1922; (1917, 1920–1924); Muskegon, Michigan

Minor league affiliations
- Class: Class B (1917, 1920–1924)
- League: Central League (1917, 1920–1922); Michigan-Ontario League (1923–1924)

Major league affiliations
- Team: None

Minor league titles
- League titles (0): None
- Conference titles (0): None
- Wild card berths (0): None

Team data
- Name: Muskegon Muskies (1917, 1920–1922); Muskegon Anglers (1923–1924)
- Ballpark: Marsh Field (1917, 1920–1924)

The Muskegon Muskies were a minor league baseball team based in Muskegon, Michigan. The Muskegon "Muskies" played in the 1917 season and from 1920 to 1922 as members of the Class B level Central League. After the Central League folded, Muskegon continued play as member of the members of the Class B level Michigan-Ontario League in 1923 and 1924, playing as the Muskegon "Anglers." The Muskegon Muskies and Anglers teams hosted minor league home games at Marsh Field, which is still in use today.

== History ==
=== Central League 1917, 1920 to 1922 ===
Muskegon first hosted minor league baseball in 1884 when the "Muskegon" team played the season as members of the Northwestern League, finishing with a 22-34 record. The Muskies were immediately preceded in minor league play by the 1916 Muskegon Reds during a Muskegon tenure as members of the Central League. Baseball Hall of Fame member Bucky Harris played for Muskegon in 1916. Muskegon teams began play at Marsh Field in 1916.

The "Muskies and "Anglers" nicknames correspond to Muskegon's geographic location and local fishing history. Muskegon contains Muskegon Lake and is located on Lake Michigan, with a lengthy history of hosting recreational fishing and the fishing industry in the area.

In the 1917 season, the Muskegon "Muskies" continued play in the eight-team Class B level Central League, following the 1916 last place Muskegon Reds team in continuing Muskegon's membership in the league. The Dayton Veterans, Evansville Evas, Fort Wayne Chiefs, Grand Rapids Black Sox , Richmond Quakers, South Bend Benders and Springfield Reapers teams joined Muskegon in beginning league play on May 3, 1917.

The Muskies ended the 1917 season with a record of 65–57 to place fourth in the final regular season standings, playing the season under manager Jimmy Hamilton. Muskegon ended the season 14.0 games behind the first place Grand Rapids Black Sox. The Muskies did not qualify for the playoff won by Grand Rapids over the Peoria Distillers. Pitcher Paul Wachtel of Muskegon led the league with 176 strikeouts. The Central League did not return to play in 1917 due to World War I, which affected many minor leagues.

Following a two-season hiatus, the Central League reformed in 1920, with the Muskegon Muskies returning to league play, The Central League reformed as a four-team league, with the Grand Rapids Joshers, Kalamazoo Celery Pickers and Ludington Mariners teams joined with Muskegon to resume league play beginning May 12, 1920.

In their return to the Central League, Muskegon ended the 1920 season in last place in the four-team league. Playing the season under manager Doc White, the Muskies ended the season with a record of 47–77 to finish 28.0 games behind first place Grand Rapids.

The Muskegon Muskies continued play the 1921 Class B level Central League. The league expanded from a four team to a six-team league in 1921, adding the Lansing Senators and Jackson Mayors teams to the league.

The 1921 Muskegon Muskies had a record of 63–67 and finished in fourth place in the final Central League standings. The 1921 manager was Davey Claire, as the Muskies ended the season 24.5 games behind the first place Ludington Mariners in the six-team league. Muskegon pitcher Lawrence Reno led the Central League with 133 strikeouts.

In 1922, Davey Claire returned as the Muskegon Muskies manager to begin the season. With a record of 67–62, the Muskies ended the season in third place in the six-team Central League, as Claire and Carrington Sweeney served as managers. Muskegon ended the season 9.5 games behind the first place Ludington Mariners. The Muskies did not qualify for the playoff, where the Grand Rapids Billbobs defeated Ludington to win the league title.The Central League did not return to play in 1923.

=== Michigan-Ontario League 1923 & 1924 ===
After the Central League folded, Muskegon continued minor league play in 1923. The Muskegon "Anglers" became members of the eight-team Class B level Michigan-Ontario League, as Muskegon replaced the Kitchener Terriers franchise in the league. Muskegon joined with the Bay City Wolves, Flint Vehicles, Grand Rapids Billbobs 1923, Hamilton Tigers, Kalamazoo Celery Pickers, London Tecumsehs and Saginaw Aces in beginning league play on May 1, 1923.

In 1923, Charles Marsh became president of the Muskegon Anglers. Marsh was the namesake of the Muskegon ballpark and had previously served as president of the Muskegon teams of the Michigan State League beginning in 1910. Marsh continued as the Muskegon president in 1924.

In 1923, the Anglers ended the season with a record 73–57 to place third in the league standings. Muskegon was managed by Red Fisher, as the Anglers finished 3.5 games behind the first place Bay City Wolves. No playoffs were held.

In 1924, Muskegon continued play and the Anglers placed seventh in the Michigan-Ontario League regular season standings. With a record of 58–79, Musekgon played the season under managers Red Fisher and Jack Ryan, as the Anglers finished 28.5 games behind the first place Bay City Wolves. The Anglers did not qualify for the playoff won by Bay City over the Flint Vehicles.

In 1925, the Michigan-Ontario League reduced to six teams and the Muskegon franchise was folded. In 1926, the Muskegon Reds resumed minor league play as members of the Michigan State League.

== The ballpark ==
The Muskegon Anglers and Muskies hosted home minor league games at Marsh Field. Originally constructed in 1916, the ballpark is still in use today after being rebuilt in 1956. The field was named for its founder, Charles W. Marsh, who purchased the property, consisting of four city blocks and built the ballfield. Marsh served as president of the Muskegon Anglers.

Marsh Field hosted Muskegon minor league teams from 1916 to 1951 and also was home to the Muskegon Lassies of the All-American Girls Professional Baseball League. The ballpark has been named as a State of Michigan Historical Landmark. Today, Marsh Field is home to the amateur Muskegon Clippers summer collegiate baseball team, who play as members of the Great Lakes Summer Collegiate League. The ballpark is located at 1800 Peck Street in Muskegon, Michigan.

== Timeline ==
Year(s)	# Yrs.	Team	Level	League	Ballpark
1917, 1920–1922	2	Muskegon Muskies	Class B	Central League	Marsh Field
1923–1924	1	Muskegon Anglers	Class B	Michigan-Ontario League	Marsh Field

== Year-by-year records ==
Year	Record	Finish	Manager	Playoffs/notes
1917	65–57	4th	Jimmy Hamilton	Did not qualify
1920	47–77	4th	Doc White	No playoffs held
1921	63–67	4th	Davey Claire	No playoffs held
1922	67–62	3rd	Davey Claire / Carrington Sweeney	Did not qualify
1923	73–57	3rd	Red Fisher	No playoffs held
1924	58–79	7th	Red Fisher / Jack Ryan	No playoffs held

== Notable alumni ==
- Sam Brenegan (1917)
- Ray Brubaker (1917)
- Davey Claire (1921, MGR)
- Bud Clancy (1924)
- Buck Crouse (1922-1923)
- Jess Cortazzo (1924)
- Charlie Dorman (1923)
- Verdo Elmore (1924)
- Red Fisher (1923-1924, MGR)
- Freddie Fitzsimmons (1920-1922)
- Heinie Jantzen (1917)
- George Kahler (1917)
- Joe Kiefer (1920)
- LaRue Kirby (1917)
- Fred Kommers (1921)
- George Loepp (1924)
- Ben Paschal (1917)
- Lerton Pinto 1923)
- Jack Ryan (1924, MGR)
- John Scheneberg (1917)
- Duke Shirey (1920)
- Al Stokes (1920-1921)
- Paul Wachtel (1917)
- Tony Welzer (1922-1924)
- Jimmy Whelan (1917)
- Doc White (1920, MGR)

== See also ==
- Muskegon Muskies players
- Muskegon Anglers players
