= Marion Oilworkers =

Minor league baseball team in Ohio

- 1903–1904; Marion, Ohio

Minor league affiliations
- Class: Class B (1903–1904)
- League: Central League (1903–1904)

Major league affiliations
- Team: None

Minor league titles
- League titles (0): None

Team data
- Name: Marion Oilworkers (1903–1904)
- Ballpark: Webb Park (1903–1904)

The Marion Oilworkers were a minor league baseball team based in Marion, Ohio and Marion County, Ohio. In 1903 and 1904, the Oilworkers played as members of the Class B level Central League, while hosting home minor league games at Webb Park. In 1904, the Oilworkers relocated to and from Peoria, Illinois during the season.

== History ==
Marion, Ohio first hosted minor league baseball in 1900, when the Marion "Glass Blowers" team played a partial season as members of Class B level Interstate League. The Glass Blowers finished in seventh place before the league folded following the season.

In 1903, the Marion "Oilworkers" resumed minor league play, as the team became charter members of the eight-team, Class B level Central League. The Anderson Orphans, Dayton Veterans, Evansville River Rats, Fort Wayne Railroaders, South Bend Green Stockings, Terre Haute Hottentots and Wheeling Stogies joined Marion in beginning Central League play on April 30, 1903.

The "Oilworkers" nickname for the team corresponds to industrial oil digging efforts that took place in the Marion region in the era.

In their first season of play, Marion placed third in the Central League. The Oilworkers ended their initial Central League season with a record of 71–65, playing the season under manager John Grim. Marion finished 17.0 games behind the first-place Fort Wayne Railroaders in the final regular season standings, as the league held no playoffs.

The Marion Oilworkers continued play in the 1904 Central League, before relocating and returning during the same season.

On May 29, 1903, one day before the team relocated, pitcher/infielder Jim Hackett threw a two-hit shutout against the Fort Wayne Railroaders, winning 3–0. Hackett was attempting a comeback after losing eyesight due to a poison ivy related infection in 1903 that left him hospitalized for over two months.

The next day, on May 30, 1903, Marion moved to become the Peoria Distillers, with a 12–15 record. After compiling a 27–33 record while based in Peoria, the franchise returned to Marion on July 24, 1904, and played the remainder of the season as the Oilworkers, finishing in sixth place. Overall, the Marion/Peoria team compiled an overall record of 61–75 and finished 25.5 games behind the first place Fort Wayne Railroaders in the final standings of the eight-team league. The Oilworkers were managed by the returning John Grim and Mike Lawrence during their final season.

The Marion Oilworkers did not return to the 1905 Central League and were replaced by the Springfield Babes franchise in league play.

After Marion did not host a team in 1905, the Oilworkers were succeeded in minor league play by the 1906 "Marion" team that played a partial season as members of the Class B level Interstate Association. They were followed by the 1906 and 1907 Marion Moguls, who played as members the Class C level Ohio-Pennsylvania League.

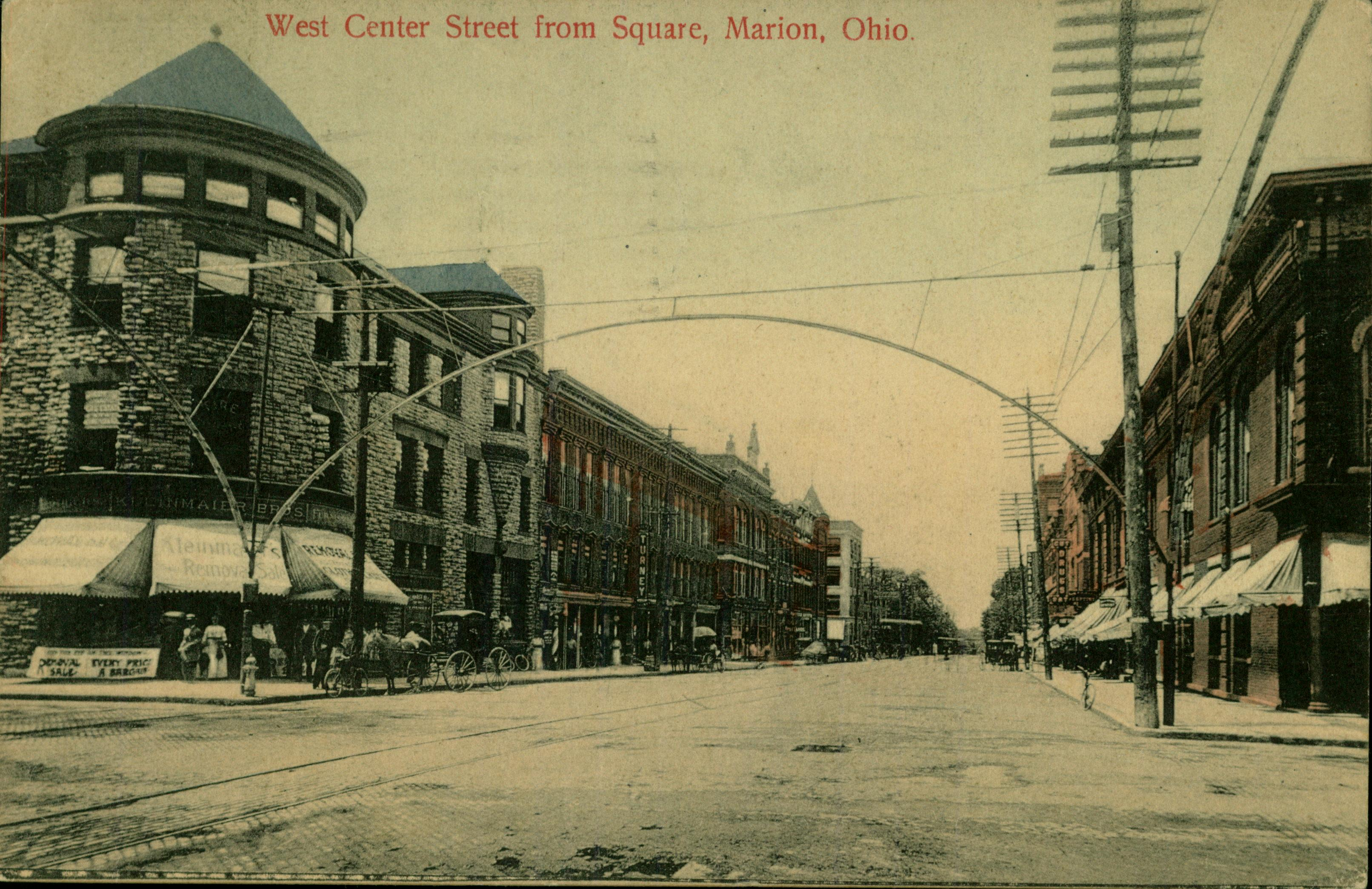
(1905) West Center Street. Marion, Ohio.

== The ballpark ==
The Marion Oilers hosted minor league home games at Webb Park. The ballpark had a capacity of 800 and was located in Marion.

In 1907, Webb Park hosted a 20-inning game between the Mansfield Pioneers and the Marion Moguls. Mansfield won the game 2–1 and the game was played in 2 hours 18 minutes.

== Timeline ==
Year(s)	# Yrs.	Team	Level	League	Ballpark
1903	2	Marion Oilworkers	Class D	Central League	Webb Park
1904(1)	1	Marion Oilworkers	Class D	Central League	Webb Park
1904(2)	1	Peoria Distillers	Class D	Central League	Lakeview Park
1904(3)	1	Marion Oilworkers	Class D	Central League	Webb Park

== Year-by-year records ==
Year	Record	Finish	Manager	Playoffs / Notes
1903	71–65	3rd	John Grim	No playoffs held
1904	61–75	6th	John Grim / Mike Lawrence	No playoffs held Marion (12–15) moved to Peoria May 30; Peoria (27–33) moved to Marion July 24

== Notable alumni ==
- John Grim (1903–1904, MGR)
- Jim Hackett (1904)
- Tom Letcher (1903–1904)
- Ted McGrew (1904)
- Dave Pickett (1903)
- Owen Shannon (1904)

== See also ==
- Marion Oilworkers players
