= Springfield Governors =

- 1897–1898; (1897–1899, 1905–1907); Springfield, Ohio

Minor league affiliations
- Class: Class B (1897–1899, 1905–1907)
- League: Interstate League (1897–1899); Central League (1905–1907)

Major league affiliations
- Team: None

Minor league titles
- League titles (1): 1907
- Conference titles (1): 1916

Team data
- Name: Springfield Governors (1897–1898); Springfield Wanderers (1899); Springfield Babes (1905–1907)
- Ballpark: Snyder Field (1897–1899, 1905–1907)

The Springfield Governors were a minor league baseball team based in Springfield, Ohio. The Springfield "Governors" and "Wanderers" were members of the Class B level Interstate League from 1897 to 1899. The Springfield "Babes" continued minor league play as members of the Class B level Central League, from 1905 to 1907, winning the 1907 league championship.

The Springfield teams hosted home minor league games at Snyder Field, which opened in 1897.

== History ==
=== Interstate League 1897 to 1899 ===
Minor league baseball began in Springfield, Ohio in 1877, when the Springfield "Champion City" team played as members of the League Alliance, which lasted one season. The 1890 "Springfield" team preceded the Governors in minor league play, ending a two-season tenure in the Tri-State League.

In 1897, the Springfield "Governors" began play as members of the Class B level Interstate League. The Dayton Old Soldiers, Fort Wayne Indians, Mansfield Haymakers, New Castle Quakers, Toledo Mud Hens, Wheeling Nailers and Youngstown Puddlers teams joined Springfield in beginning league play on May 2, 1897.

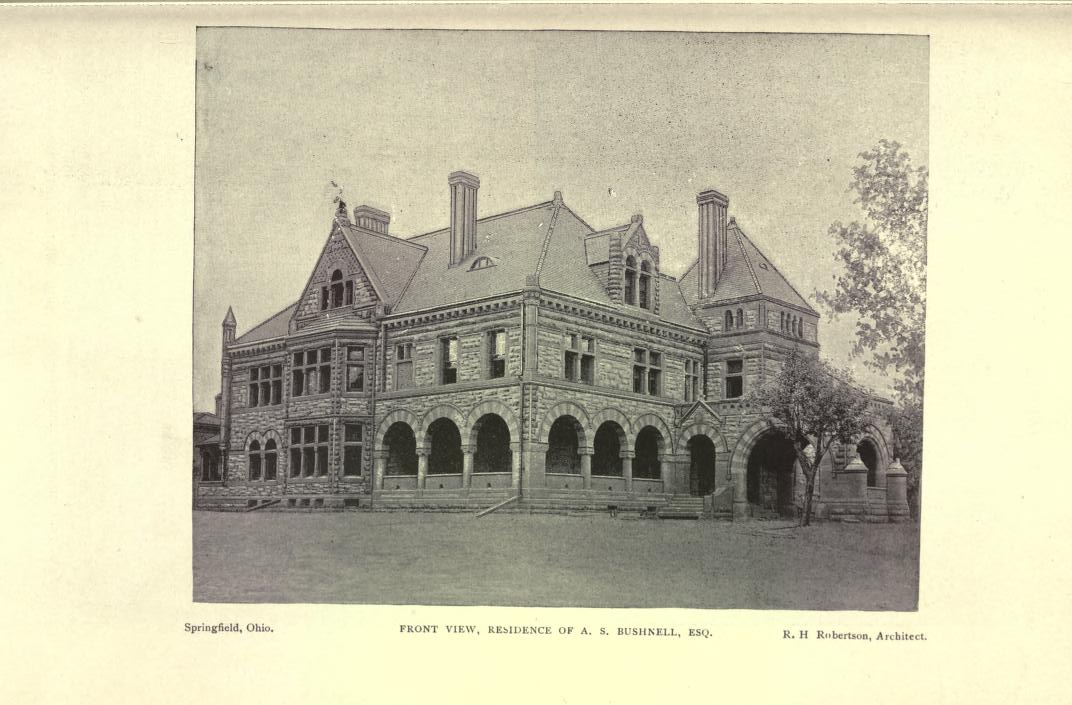
(1896) 838 E. High Street in Springfield, Ohio, United States. The home of Ohio governor Asa S. Bushnell. Today, is part of the East High Street Historic District. Listed on the National Register of Historic Places.

The Springfield "Governors" nickname corresponds to Springfield being home to Asa S. Bushnell, who was elected as Governor of Ohio in 1895. Today, the Bushnell mansion is located at 838 East High Street in Springfield.

In their first season of play, the 1897 Springfield Governors placed seventh in the eight-team Interstate League. The Governors finished with a record of 46–79, playing the season under managers Harry Rinehart and Lew Whistler. Springfield ended the season 36.5 games behind the first place Toledo Mud Hens in the final Interstate League standings. With their seventh-place finish, the Governors did not qualify for the playoff won by Toledo over the Dayton.

Continuing in Interstate League play, the 1898 Springfield Governors improved to a third-place finish. The Governors played the season under returning manager Lew Whistler. Springfield ended the 1898 season with a record of 81–66, finishing just 2.0 games behind the first place Dayton Old Soldiers in the eight-team league. No playoff was held. The Springfield franchise folded after the season.

In the 1899 season, the Springfield team did not begin the season as members of the eight-team Interstate League but joined the league during the season. On July 20, 1899, the Grand Rapids Furniture Makers moved to become the Columbus Senators. On July 20, 1899, Columbus moved to Springfield, where the team finished the season known as the Springfield "Wanderers." The three-city team ended the season with a final overall record of 49–91, playing under manager Frank Torreyson in all three locations. Springfield ended the season 38.0 games behind the first place New Castle Quakers in the Class B level league. No league playoffs were held.

In the 1900 season, the Interstate League played its final season without a Springfield franchise in the league. Springfield was replaced by the Columbus Senators, who returned to begin the season in the league.

=== Central League 1905 to 1907, championship ===
After a five-season hiatus, minor league play resumed when the 1905 Springfield "Babes" became members of the Class B level Central League. The Dayton Veterans, Evansville River Rats, Fort Wayne Railroaders, Grand Rapids Orphans, South Bend Greens, Terre Haute Hottentots and Wheeling Stogies teams joined Springfield in beginning league play on April 27, 1905.

In their first season of play in the new league, the 1905, Springfield Babes placed sixth in the eight-team Class B level Central League. Managed by Harry Wilson and Jack Hendricks, the Babes placed sixth in the league a 66–68 regular season record. Springfield ended the season 14.0 games behind the first place Wheeling Stogies in the final standings. No Interstate League playoff was held.

The Springfield Babes ended the 1906 Class B Central League season as the runner up in the eight-team league. With a final record of 91–60, Springfield ended the season 8.0 games behind the first place Grand Rapids Wolverines in the Central League final standings. Jack Hendricks returned as the Babes' manager. No playoff was held.

In 1907 Jack Hendricks returned to manage the Springfield for a third season and the Babes won the Central League championship. With a final record of 86–49, the Babes ended the season 8.5 games ahead of the second place Wheeling Stogies in the Central League standings. Springfield player Champ Osteen led the Central League with a .338 average and 170 total hits. Larry Lejeune tied for the Central League lead with 7 home runs and Joe Collins scored 96 runs to lead the league. Springfield pitcher Matt Muldowney had a 18–6 record, best winning percentage in the Interstate League,

Despite winning the 1907 Central League championship, the Springfield franchise folded and was replaced in the 1908 league by the Zanesville Infants.

With Springfield folded, Jack Hendricks remained in the Central League and became manager of the Fort Wayne Billikens. Jack Hendricks later managed both the St. Louis Cardinals for six seasons and the Cincinnati Reds for one season in the major leagues. Hendricks received his law degree from Northwestern University Law School and was admitted to the bar in the state of Illinois. Hendricks became one of a select group of major league managers to hold a law degree or pass a state bar. The others include James Henry O'Rourke, Miller Huggins, Branch Rickey, John Montgomery Ward, Hughie Jennings, Muddy Ruel, and Tony La Russa.

In 1911, the Springfield Reapers resumed minor league play, as the team became members of the Class D level Ohio State League, beginning another Springfield tenure in minor league play. In 1928, the Springfield Buckeyes team returned the city to Central League play when the league reformed.

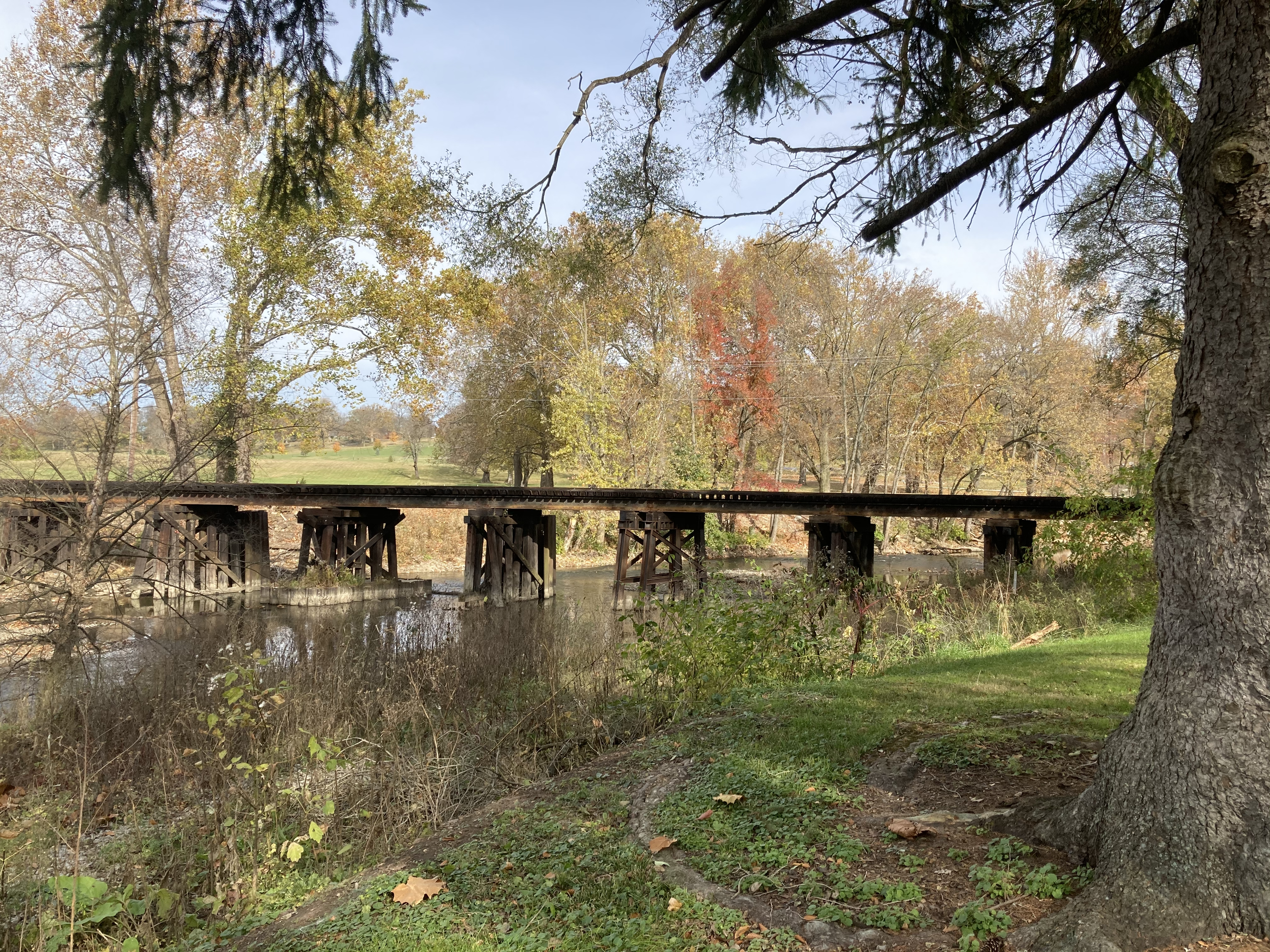
(2020) Railroad bridge in Snyder Park, Springfield, Ohio. The 1,000-acre park contained Snyder Field, home to the Springfield baseball teams beginning in 1897.

== The ballpark ==
The Springfield Reapers teams hosted minor league home games at Snyder Field. The site of Snyder Park was donated to the city of Springfield by brothers John and David Snyder in 1895, with the parcel containing over 1,000 acres. After two years of development, Snyder Park had an opening ceremony on April 22, 1897. The park itself was designed by architect Herman Haerlin. Today, the site is still in use as part of Snyder Park, a public park. The Snyder Field ballpark was located on Park Street off Snyder Park Road in Springfield, Ohio.

== Timeline ==
| Year(s) | # Yrs. | Team | Level | League | Ballpark |
|---|---|---|---|---|---|
| 1897–1898 | 2 | Springfield Governors | Class B | Interstate League | Snyder Field |
| 1899 | 1 | Springfield Wanderers | Class B | Interstate League | Snyder Field |
| 1916–1917 | 2 | Springfield Babes | Class B | Central League | Snyder Field |

== Year-by-year records ==
| Year | Record | Finish | Manager | Playoffs / Notes |
|---|---|---|---|---|
| 1897 | 46–79 | 7th | Harry Rinehart / Lew Whistler | Did not qualify |
| 1898 | 81–66 | 3rd | Lew Whistler | No playoffs held |
| 1899 | 49–91 | 8th | Frank Torreyson | Columbus moved to Springfield July 30; No playoffs held |
| 1905 | 66–68 | 6th | Jack Hendricks | No playoffs held |
| 1906 | 91–60 | 2nd | Jack Hendricks | No playoffs held |
| 1907 | 86–49 | 1st | Jack Hendricks | League champions No playoffs held |

== Notable alumni ==
- Cy Alberts (1906–1907)
- Nick Altrock (1899)
- Monte Beville (1899)
- Joe Burke (1899)
- Billy Campbell (1899)
- Henry Cote (1899)
- Frank Cross (1897)
- Gene Curtis (1905)
- Pete Daniels (1899)
- Cliff Daringer (1907)
- John Dobbs (1897–1898)
- John Dolan (1897–1899)
- Red Dooin (1899)
- Charlie Emig (1898)
- John Farrell (1897–1898)
- Frank Freund (1897)
- Bill Friel (1905)
- William Gallagher (1899)
- Lou Gertenrich (1905)
- Jack Harper (1899)
- Charlie Hemphill (1899)
- Jack Hendricks (1905–1907, MGR)
- Jesse Hoffmeister (1897)
- Joe Kostal (1898)
- Otto Krueger (1899)
- Larry LeJeune (1907)
- Billy Kelly (1906–1907)
- Ed McKean (1905)
- Bill Niles (1898)
- Tim O'Rourke (1898)
- Jack Mercer (1907)
- Champ Osteen (1905–1907)
- Ed Poole (1897–1898)
- Josh Reilly (1897)
- Owen Shannon (1905)
- Al Shaw (1905)
- Johnny Siegle (1899)
- John Sowders (1897)
- Ed Summers (1905)
- Lew Whistler (1897–1898, MGR)
- Charlie Ziegler (1899)

== See also ==
- Springfield Governors players
- Springfield Wanderers players
- Springfield Babes players
