= Grand Rapids Jets =

- 1948–1951; Grand Rapids, Michigan

Minor league affiliations
- Class: Class A (1948–1951)
- League: Central League (1948–1951)

Major league affiliations
- Team: Chicago Cubs (1950–1951)

Minor league titles
- League titles (1): 1949
- Wild card berths (2): 1949; 1950

Team data
- Name: Grand Rapids Jets (1948–1951)
- Ballpark: Bigelow Field (1948–1951)

The Grand Rapids Jets were a minor league baseball team based in Grand Rapids, Michigan. From 1948 to 1951, the "Jets" played exclusively as members of the Class A level Central League, winning the 1949 league championship. Hosting home games at Bigelow Field for their duration, the Grand Rapids Jets were a minor league affiliate of the Chicago Cubs in 1950 and 1951.

== History ==
The "Jets" were preceded in minor league baseball by the 1941 Grand Rapids Colts, who were members of the Class C level Michigan State League.

In 1948, minor league baseball resumed in Grand Rapids, when the Grand Rapids Jets joined the six–team, Class A level Central League, which was reforming following World War II. In the era, Class A was the highest level of the minor leagues. The Dayton Indians, Flint Arrows, Fort Wayne Generals, Muskegon Clippers, and Saginaw Bears teams joined the Jets in beginning league play on April 28, 1948. The Jets were the only team in the 1948 Central League that did not have a major league affiliation.

In their first season of play, the 1948 Jets finished in last place in the Central League regular season, missing the four–team playoffs. Grand Rapids ended the Central League regular season with a record of 52–86, placing sixth in the final standings. Milt Galatzer and Jack Knight served as managers and Knight would manage the team in each of their four seasons of play. Grand Rapids finished 37.0 games behind the first place Flint Arrows in the standings. The Dayton Indians won the playoffs.

The Jets rebounded in 1949 to win the Central League championship. Grand Rapids placed third in the Central League regular season with a record of 70–66, finishing 9.5 games behind the Dayton Indians, as Jack Knight again served as manager. In the first round of the playoffs, Grand Rapids beat the Flint Arrows 3 games to 2 and advanced. In the finals, the Jets won the championship by defeating the Charleston Senators 4 games to 2.

The Jets became a minor league affiliate of the Chicago Cubs in 1950 and qualified for the Central League playoffs. The Grand Rapids Jets ended the Central League regular season with a record of 64–68, placing fourth in the standings. Jack Knight returned as manager. The Jets finished 15.5 games behind the first place Flint Arrows, who then defeated Grand Rapids in the first round of the playoffs 3 games to 1.

In their final season as the Jets, Grand Rapids placed fifth in the 1951 Central League standings, as the league held no playoffs in its final season. Continuing as a Chicago Cubs affiliate, Grand Rapids ended the 1951 season with a record of 53–82, as Jack Knight and Everett Robinson served as managers. The Jets finished 33.0 games behind the champion Dayton Indians in the final standings. Jets pitcher Calvin Howe led the Central League with a 2.33 ERA.

The Central League permanently folded following the 1951 season. The Grand Rapids area was without minor league baseball until 1994, when nearby Comstock Park began hosting the West Michigan White Caps in their tenure as members of the Class A level Midwest League.

== The ballpark ==
The Grand Rapids Jets hosted home minor league games at Bigelow Field. The ballpark had dimensions (Left, Center, Right) of: 298–530–298 and a seating capacity of 8,000, reduced from 12,000. Bigelow Field was located at 39th Street & South Division Street. Beginning in 1950, the Jets shared Bigelow Field with the Grand Rapids Chicks of the All-American Girls Professional Baseball League. The 1940 Grand Rapids Dodgers and 1941 Grand Rapids Colts had previously hosted home games at the ballpark.

The ballpark was destroyed by fire in 1952 and was located at 3871 Division Avenue South in Grand Rapids, Michigan.

== Timeline ==
| Year(s) | # Yrs. | Team | Level | League | Affiliate | Ballpark |
|---|---|---|---|---|---|---|
| 1948–1949 | 2 | Grand Rapids Jets | Class A | Central League | None | Bigelow Field |
| 1950–1951 | 2 | Grand Rapids Jets | Class A | Central League | Chicago Cubs | Bigelow Field |

== Year–by–year records ==
| Year | Record | Finish | Manager | Attend | Playoffs/notes |
|---|---|---|---|---|---|
| 1948 | 52–86 | 6th | Milt Galatzer / Jack Knight | 46,058 | Did not Qualify |
| 1949 | 70–66 | 3rd | Jack Knight | 62,982 | League champions |
| 1950 | 64–68 | 4th | Jack Knight | 54,741 | Lost 1st round |
| 1951 | 53–82 | 5th | Jack Knight / Everett Robinson | 21,230 | No playoffs held |

== Notable alumni ==
- Hiram Bithorn (1949)
- Hy Cohen (1950)
- Marv Felderman (1948)
- Milt Galatzer (1948, MGR)
- Sammy Gee (1949)
- Dave Hoskins (1948–1949)
- Cal Howe (1950–1951)
- Jack Knight (1948–1951, MGR)
- George Piktuzis (1951)
- Dusty Rhodes (1950)
- Andy Varga (1951)

== See also ==
- Grand Rapids Jets players
