= Zanesville Potters =

- 1910–1912; (1910–1913); Zanesville, Ohio

Minor league affiliations
- Class: Class B (1910–1913)
- League: Central League (1910–1912); Interstate League (1913)

Major league affiliations
- Team: None

Minor league titles
- League titles (0): None

Team data
- Name: Zanesville Potters (1910–1912); Zanesville Flood Sufferers (1913)
- Ballpark: Unknown (1910–1913)

The Zanesville Potters were a minor league baseball team based in Zanesville, Ohio. The "Potters" played as members of the Class B level Central League from 1910 to 1912. In 1913, the "Zanesville Flood Sufferers" briefly continued minor league play in the Interstate League, before the team disbanded in June 1913.

The 1913 Zanesville team was named for a major 1913 flood that affected Zanesville. The flood occurred just months after a tornado hit the town in 1912.

== History ==
Minor league baseball in Zanesville began with the 1887 Zanesville Kickapoos, who were charter members of the Ohio State League. The Zanesville Potters were immediately preceded in minor league play by the 1909 Zanesville Infants, of the Class B level Central League before the team changed nicknames.

The newly nicknamed Zanesville "Potters" continued play in the 1910 eight-team, Class B level Central League. The Dayton Veterans, Evansville River Rats, Fort Wayne Billikens, Grand Rapids Raiders, South Bend Bronchos, Terre Haute Stags and Wheeling Stogies joined Zanesville in beginning league play on May 4, 1910.

The "Potters" nickname corresponds to local industry and natural resources. J.B. Owens Pottery was founded in 1885. The Zanesville Art Pottery was founded in 1900 and operated in the city until being sold in 1920. The Zanesville area had an abundance of clay and silica deposits, discovered in 1820, leading to art culture and manufacturing.

In 1910, the Potters placed sixth in the Central League standings. With a regular season record of 61–76, Zanesville played the season under returning manager Roy Montgomery, who had managed the Infants in 1909. Zanesville finished 27.0 games behind the first place South Bend Bronchos in the final league standings.

Continuing play in 1911, the Potters placed third in the eight-team Central League. Zanesville finished with an overall record of 74–58, playing the season under manager Joe Raidey. Zanesville ended the season 11.0 games behind the first place Dayton Veterans.

Zanesville remained in the 1912 Class B level Central League for a final season in the league. The Potters placed eleventh in the 12–team Central League, after the league had expanded. Zanesville ended the season with a record of 52–78, finishing 25.5 games behind the first Place Fort Wayne Railroaders. The Potters were managed Willis Kelley, Jack Pendry and Marty Hogan.

During the 1912 season, a deadly tornado hit Zanesville on June 16, 1912.

The Zanesville franchise did not return to the 1913 Central League, with a newly named Zanesville team joining a new league in 1913.

Zanesville continued minor league play in the 1913 season. The Zanesville "Flood Sufferers" became members of the Class B level Interstate League and played a partial season under returning manager Marty Hogan. The team disbanded on July 13, 1913, with a 27–46 record. The team nickname referred to a flood of the Muskingum River in March 1913, part of the Great Flood of 1913. The local flooding left downtown areas of Zanesville under 20 feet of water, as the river crested at 27 feet above flood stage. The flood was the second natural disaster in Zanesville in nine months and 361 people died in the flooding.

Zanesville next hosted minor league baseball in 1933 when the Zanesville Greys joined the Middle Atlantic League.

== The ballpark ==
The name of the Zanesville ballpark during the Central League era is not directly referenced.

Mark Greys Athletic Park was in use in the era, hosting baseball. The park was located at Putnam Avenue & Ontario Street in Zanesville. The location corresponds to the location of today's War Veteran's Park.

Later, the Zanesville Dodgers teams hosted home minor league home games at Gant Park Municipal Stadium, which was called "Municipal Stadium" in the Dodgers era. Located on West Main Street, Gant Stadium received State Historic Designation in 2021.

== Timeline ==
Year(s)	# Yrs.	Team	Level	League
1910–1912	3	Zanesville Potters	Class B	Central League
1913	1	Zanesville Flood Suffers	Class B	Interstate League

== Year–by–year records ==
Year	Record	Finish	Manager	Playoffs / notes
1910	61–76	6th	Roy Montgomery	No playoffs held
1911	74–58	3rd	Joe Raidy	No playoffs held
1912	52–78	11th	Willis Kelley / Jack Pendry; Marty Hogan	No playoffs held
1913	27–46	NA	Marty Hogan	Team folded July 13

== Notable alumni ==
- Joe Connolly (1910)
- Rube DeGroff (1911)
- Rufus Gilbert (1912)
- Marty Hogan (1912–1913, MGR)
- Ducky Holmes (1910)
- Harry Huston (1912)
- Nick Kahl (1911)
- Duke Kenworthy (1910)
- Sad Sam Jones (1913)
- Carl Manda (1910, 1912)
- Dizzy Nutter (1913)
- Duke Reilley (1911–1912)
- Jack Sheehan (1912–1913)
- Phil Stremmel (1911–1912)
- Walt Tragesser (1912–1913)
- Hi West (1912)

== See also ==
Zanesville Potters players
Zanesville Flood Sufferers players
