= Clarence E. Cartwright =

American baseball and football player and football coach

Biographical details
- Education: Indiana (1912)

Playing career

Football
- 1906–1907: Indiana

Baseball
- 1912: Evansville Yankees
- Position: Fullback

Coaching career (HC unless noted)

Football
- 1914: Indiana (assistant)
- 1920–1921: Baldwin Wallace
- 1923–1926: Illinois Wesleyan

Baseball
- 1927: Illinois Wesleyan

Clarence Earl Cartwright was a minor league baseball player an American football player and coach. He graduated from Indiana University in 1912, where he played fullback on the football team and was later an assistant coach.

He served as the head football coach at Baldwin–Wallace College–now Baldwin Wallace University–in Berea, Ohio, from 1920 to 1921 and at Illinois Wesleyan University from 1923 to 1926, where he also served as the school's head baseball coach in 1927.
