= Punch Knoll =

American baseball player (1881–1960)

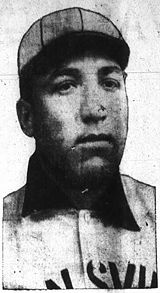
- Knoll with the Evansville River Rats in 1909
- Outfielder
- Born: October 7, 1881; Evansville, Indiana, U.S.
- Died: February 8, 1960 (aged 78); Evansville, Indiana, U.S.
- Batted: Right Threw: Right

MLB debut
- April 27, 1905, for the Washington Senators

Last MLB appearance
- October 4, 1905, for the Washington Senators

MLB statistics
- Batting average: .213
- Home runs: 0
- RBI: 29
- Stats at Baseball Reference

Teams
- Washington Senators (1905)

Charles Elmer "Punch" Knoll (October 7, 1881 in Evansville, Indiana, USA – February 8, 1960 in Evansville, Indiana) was an American Major League Baseball outfielder who played for the Washington Senators in 1905. He also spent 27 seasons playing in the minor leagues and managed in the minor leagues for 22 seasons.

== Major league career ==
Knoll made his major league debut on April 27, 1905, with the Senators and played in 79 games for them. He hit .213 with no home runs and 29 RBI in 244 at-bats, scoring 24 runs and hitting five triples. He committed eight errors as an outfielder in his only major league season, posting a .927 fielding percentage at that position. He played his final big league game on October 4.

== Minor league career ==
Knoll began his minor league career in 1901 and played every season, except for 1905, 1918 and 1929, until 1930. A .279 hitter, he had 2,455 career hits, 456 doubles, 141 triples and 85 home runs. In seasons in which he had more than 100 at-bats, Knoll hit more than .300 five times. He also exceeded the 10-triple mark four times and the 10-home run mark three times.

== Managerial career ==
Knoll managed the Evansville River Rats from 1907 to 1909, leading them to a league championship in 1908. He then managed the Dayton Veterans from 1910 to 1912, leading them to a league championship in 1911. In 1913, he returned to the River Rats and managed them until 1915. They switched their name to the Evansville Evas for the 1916 season, and he managed them until 1917.

He next managed the Ludington Mariners in 1920 and the Bay City Wolves from 1921 to 1924, leading them to successive league championships in 1923 and 1924. In 1925, he returned to the Danville Veterans, whom he managed until 1926. He then managed the Quincy Red Birds for part of 1927 (replacing Mack Allison), the Fort Wayne Chiefs in 1928 (leading them to a league championship), the Wilkes-Barre Barons in 1929 (replacing Don Sykes) and the Fort Wayne Chiefs again in 1930.

Following his death, he was interred at Locust Hill Cemetery in Evansville.
