= Canton Terriers =

US minor league baseball team (1928–1942)

- 1928–1942; (1928–1930, 1932, 1936–1942); Canton, Ohio

Minor league affiliations
- Previous classes: Class C (1936–1942); Class B (1928–1930)
- League: Middle Atlantic League (1936–1942)
- Previous leagues: Central League (1928–1930, 1932)

Major league affiliations
- Previous teams: Boston Red Sox (1936–1942)

Minor league titles
- League titles: 3 (1929, 1937, 1939)
- Division titles: 3 (1929, 1937, 1939)

The Canton Terriers was the name of a minor league baseball team from Canton, Ohio, that played between 1928 and 1942. The team was formed in 1928 as a member of the Central League and played there until 1932. In 1936 a new Terriers team was formed and began play in the Middle Atlantic League, as an affiliate of the Boston Red Sox, until 1942.

The team folded in 1942, when the rest of the Middle Atlantic League suspended operations due to the strains of World War II. The Terriers were not re-established when the league resumed operations after the war.

During their brief history, the team won one title in the Central League in 1929, as well as two titles in the Middle Atlantic League in 1937 and 1939.

== Notable players ==
- Mose Solomon, the "Rabbi of Swat", Major League Baseball player

== Year-by-year record ==
Year	Record	Finish	Manager	Playoff series
1928	43–90	6th	Joe Agler/Dan O'Leary	Did not qualify
1929	80–58	1st	James Hamilton	League Champs; No playoffs
1930	65–73	4th	Heinie Groh	No playoffs
1932	9–26 (28–60 overall)*	6th	John McCloskey	Did not qualify
1936	68–59	4th	Floyd Patterson	No playoffs
1937	81–46	1st	Floyd Patterson	League Champs defeated Akron Yankees (3–2)
1938	79–51	2nd	Floyd Patterson	Lost in 1st round defeated by Akron Yankees (3–0)
1939	77–52	1st	Floyd Patterson	League Champs defeated Springfield Indians (4–1)
1940	58–65	5th	Floyd Patterson	Did not qualify
1941	71–54	3rd	Floyd Patterson	Lost League Finals defeated by Erie Sailors (4–1)
1942	68–61	3rd	Floyd Patterson	Lost League Finals defeated by Erie Sailors (4–0)

*Akron Tyrites (19-34) moved to Canton July 21
