= Flint Arrows =

- 1940–1951; (1940–1941, 1948–1951); Flint, Michigan

Minor league affiliations
- Previous classes: Class A (1948–1951); Class C (1940–1941)
- Previous leagues: Michigan State League (1940–1941); Central League (1948–1950)

Major league affiliations
- Previous teams: Cleveland Indians (1940–1941); Detroit Tigers(1948–1950) Detroit Tigers (1951)

Minor league titles
- League titles: 1941, 1950
- Conference titles: 1940, 1948

Team data
- Name: Flint Gems (1940); Flint Indians (1941); Flint Arrows (1948–1951)
- Ballpark: Atwood Stadium (1940–1941, 1948–1951)

The Flint Arrows was the primary name of the minor league baseball team in Flint, Michigan from 1940 to 1941 and 1948 to 1951. Flint was a member of the Michigan State League (1940–1941) and Central League (1948–1950), playing their home games at Atwood Stadium. Flint was an affiliate of the Detroit Tigers (1948–1950) and Cleveland Indians (1940–1941).

== History ==
The Flint 1940 to 1951 teams were immediately preceded by the Flint Vehicles, who played in the Michigan State League and other minor leagues from 1906 to 1926.

The Flint Gems began play as members of the 1940 Class C level Michigan State League as an affiliate of the Cleveland Indians. Flint won the 1940 Michigan State League Pennant and the 1941 Michigan State League Championship.

The Flint Gems won the 1940 Michigan State League pennant. With a regular season of 67–41, the Gems finished first in the Michigan State League regular season. The Gems were managed by Jack Knight. In the 1940 Playoffs, the St. Joseph Autos defeated the Flint Gems 3 games to 2.

In 1941, the Flint Indians won the Michigan State League championship in the final year of the Class C league. Flint finished 70–38, to finish first in the Michigan State League regular season standings, finishing 9.0 games ahead of the second place St. Joseph Autos. The Flint Indians manager was Jack Knight. There were no playoffs in 1941.

The 1948 to 1951 Flint Arrows were a member of the Central League. Their overall record was 169–102. The Arrows won the Central League Championship in 1950 and the league Pennant in 1948. With the 1951 riots in Baltimore creating tension, Flint was noted by the Sporting News as being one of five ball teams that had games with single digit attendance.

When the Arrows started playing in Flint in April 1948 as a Detroit Tigers minor league affiliate in the Central League, their manager was Jack Tighe. The league scheduled a 140–game season in 1948. The August 26, 1949 home game with Grand Rapids had a fight break out with catcher Frank House being suspended indefinitely.

The Flint Arrows captured the Central League pennant in 1948. With a record of 89–49, Flint finished first in the Central League Standings under manager Jack Tighe. In the Playoffs, the Fort Wayne Generals defeated the Flint Arrows 3 games to 2. Flint had 1948 season attendance of 120,573, an average of 1,747 per game.

In 1950, Flint won the Central League championship. The Arrows finished 80–53 and placed first in the Central League regular season standings under manager Gene Desautels. In the 1950 Playoffs, the Flint Arrows defeated the Grand Rapids Jets 3 games to 1 to advance. In the Central League Finals, Flint defeated the Muskegon Clippers 4 games to 1 to claim the championship. The Arrows' 1950 season attendance was 67,954, an average of 1,022 per game. The Arrows lost their Tiger affiliation after the end of the season despite winning the league championship. The team's home run leader for 1950 was Edwin Little with 17.

On September 6, 1951, the Arrows had a single digit attendance with two fans watching their game according to the 1952 Sporting News Baseball Guide.

In the Final season of the Central League, the 1951 Flint Arrows finished last in the six–team league. The Arrows were 38–98 under manager Stephen Bysco. Their total season home attendance was 25,900, an average of 381 per game.

The Flint Journal reported that the team suffered from lower attendance in 1951 and struggled financially. The Arrows ended operations, along with the entire Central League, after the 1951 season. The Arrows were the last minor league baseball team based in Flint.

== The ballpark ==
The Flint teams between 1940 and 1951 played minor league home games at Atwood Stadium. Atwood Stadium is still in use today. It is owned by Kettering University, was renovated in 2015, and serves as home of Kittering athletic teams and the Flint City Bucks minor league soccer franchise. The address is 701 west 3rd Avenue, Flint, Michigan.

== Notable alumni ==
- Red Embree (1940)
- Steve Gromek (1941) MLB All-Star
- Frank House (1949)
- Cliff Mapes (1941)
- Dick Marlowe (1948)
- Jack Tighe (1948, MGR)
- Bubba Phillips (1950)
- Gene Woodling (1941) MLB All-Star
