= Ionia Mayors =

The Ionia Mayors were a Central League baseball team based in Ionia, Michigan, United States, that existed for part of the 1921 season and in 1922. They were the only professional baseball team to play in Ionia. Notable players include outfielder Fred Kommers, pitcher Phil Slattery, catcher Buck Crouse, and shortstop Davey Claire.
