= Akron Tyrites =

The Akron Tyrites were a Minor league baseball team based in Akron, Ohio. They played in the Class B Central League from 1928 to 1929. The team returned to the league in 1932, but then moved to the city of Canton during the midseason and played under the name Canton Terriers. The team was managed by John McCloskey in each of its seasons.

== MLB alumni ==
- Casper Asbjornson
- Allen Benson
- Ed Clough
- Roy Grimes
- Kenny Hogan
- Irv Jeffries
- Chuck Hostetler
- Fred Koster
- Les Mallon
- Alex McColl
