= John McCloskey (baseball manager) =

American baseball player and manager (1862–1940)

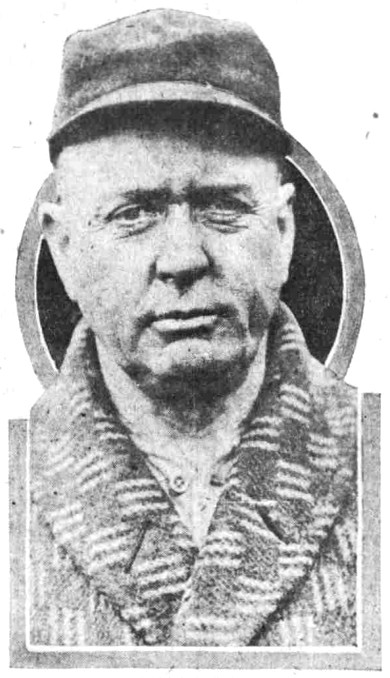
- McCloskey in 1920
- Manager
- Born: April 4, 1862; Louisville, Kentucky, U.S.
- Died: November 17, 1940 (aged 78); Louisville, Kentucky, U.S.

MLB statistics
- Managerial record: 190–417
- Winning %: .313
- Managerial record at Baseball Reference

Teams
- As manager: Louisville Colonels (1895–1896); St. Louis Cardinals (1906–1908)

John James McCloskey (April 4, 1862 – November 17, 1940) was an American professional baseball player and manager. As a player, he appeared in minor league games between 1887 and 1905. He also served as a minor league manager between 1888 and 1932. He is best remembered for managing in the major leagues, with the Louisville Colonels during 1895–1896 and St. Louis Cardinals during 1906–1908, while compiling one of the worst managerial records (in terms of winning percentage) in major league history.

== Biography ==
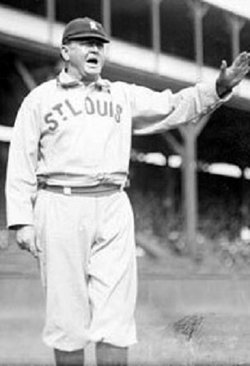
McCloskey managing with St. Louis

As a player, McCloskey was primarily an outfielder and first baseman; it is unknown if he batted and threw right-handed or left-handed. He played at least 17 seasons for minor league and independent teams between 1887 and 1905; he did not play in the major leagues. Records from this era, especially in the minor leagues, are often incomplete. Within available records, his best offensive performance was in 1890 with the Houston Mudcats of the Texas League, when he batted .340 and had 18 stolen bases in 38 games. He appeared in at least 440 professional games.

As a manager, McCloskey was active for 36 seasons, between 1888 and 1932 with several gaps. Most of those years were spent managing minor league teams; he first managed in 1888 with the San Antonio Missionaries of the Texas-Southern League, and last managed in 1932 with the Akron Tyrites / Canton Terriers of the Central League. Through 1905, he was often a player-manager. Records for the minor league teams he managed are largely incomplete. At the time of his death, the Associated Press wrote that he managed 47 teams during his career.

McCloskey first managed in the major leagues with the Louisville Colonels of the National League (NL) during 1895 and part of 1896. In 1895, the Colonels went 35–96, finishing last of 12 NL teams. McCloskey managed the Colonels for their first 19 games of the 1896 season, winning only twice; he was succeeded by Bill McGunnigle.

McCloskey's second stint as a major league manager came with the St. Louis Cardinals, also of the National League, for the 1906–1908 seasons. The Cardinals' best finished under McCloskey was seventh place, and his three St. Louis teams were a combined 153–304.

Between the Colonels and the Cardinals, teams under McCloskey went a combined 190–417 for a .313 winning percentage. McCloskey's managerial winning percentage is the second-worst in major league history, with only Doc Prothro lower (138–320, .301). (Note: The rankings include persons who managed at least 315 major league games.)

Nicknamed "Honest John", McCloskey was born in Louisville, Kentucky, in 1862; he died there in 1940 and was interred there. McCloskey was inducted to the Texas League Hall of Fame in 2004.
