= Lima Buckeyes =

The Lima Buckeyes were a very short-lived Central League baseball team, based in Lima, Ohio. Their existence consisted of only eight games in 1934, each of which they lost. Their manager was Jess Orndorff. They disbanded on May 26 of that season.

Only one known major league baseball player ever played for them - Herb Thomas.
