= Jack Tighe =

American baseball player and manager

Detroit Tigers
- Catcher / Manager
- Born: August 9, 1913; Kearny, New Jersey, U.S.
- Died: August 1, 2002 (aged 88); Pompano Beach, Florida, U.S.

Middle Atlantic League debut
- 1936, for the Charleston Senators

MLB statistics
- Win–loss record: 99–104
- Winning %: .488
- Stats at Baseball Reference

Teams
- Detroit Tigers (1957–1958)

John Thomas Tighe (August 9, 1913 – August 1, 2002) was an American minor league baseball player and a coach, manager and scout for the Detroit Tigers of Major League Baseball.

== Biography ==
Born in Kearny, New Jersey, Tighe joined the professional ranks in 1936 as a catcher with the Charleston Senators, a Detroit farm club in the Class C Middle Atlantic League. A right-handed batter listed as 5 feet 8 inches (1.73 m) tall and 170 pounds (77 kg), he rose no further as a player than Class A-1 (now Double-A), two levels below the major leagues, with the Beaumont Exporters of the Texas League in 1938–39.

The following season, Tighe became a manager in the minor leagues.

In 1940 and 1941, Tighe was player-manager of the Muskegon Clippers, a Michigan State League Tigers farm club.

He was a Detroit coach for the latter half of the 1942 American League season, then resumed his minor league managerial career from 1944 to 1953.

In 1948, Tighe was assigned to be the first manager of the Flint Arrows in the Central League.

He was again named to the coaching staff of the Tigers for 1955–56, replacing his boss, Bucky Harris, as Detroit's manager following the 1956 season. Tighe led the Tigers to a 78–76, fourth-place finish in 1957, although when Detroit faltered (21–28) early on during the 1958 campaign, he was released in favor of Bill Norman. Tighe's career managing record: 99 wins, 104 defeats (.488).

He later managed and scouted in the Milwaukee Braves organization before returning to the Tigers' farm system, winning the 1967 Governors' Cup championship and the 1968 International League regular season championship at the helm of the Toledo Mud Hens. He served full-time with the Detroit Tigers system until 1982 then under various capacities until 1990.

Jack Tighe died at age 88 on August 1, 2002, eight days short of his 89th birthday, in Pompano Beach, Florida.

=== Managerial record ===
Team	Year	Regular season					Postseason			
Team	Year	Games	Won	Lost	Win %	Finish	Won	Lost	Win %	Result
DET	1957	154	78	76	.506	4th in AL	–	–	–	
DET	1958	49	21	28	.429	8th in AL; Fired June 9	–	–	–	
Total		203	99	104	.488		0	0	–	
