= Fort Wayne Generals =

Minor league baseball team in Fort Wayne

- (1948); Fort Wayne, Indiana

Minor league affiliations
- Previous classes: Class A
- Previous leagues: Central League

Major league affiliations
- Previous teams: Pittsburgh Pirates

Team data
- Previous parks: Dwenger Park

The Fort Wayne Generals were a class-A minor league baseball, club based in Fort Wayne, Indiana. The team existed in 1948 and played in the Central League as an affiliate of the Pittsburgh Pirates. The defeated the Flint Arrows, in the league playoffs, however they were defeated by the Dayton Indians in the finals, 4 games to 2.

== 1948 season ==
Year	Record	Finish	Manager	Playoffs
1948	64-76	4th	Boom-Boom Beck	Lost League Finals (vs. Dayton Indians, 4 games to 2); Won first round (vs. Flint Arrows, 4 games to 3)
