= Marsh Field (Muskegon) =

American baseball field in Michigan

Coordinates: 43.2187°N 86.2430°W

- Interactive map of Marsh Field
- Location: 1800 Peck Street; Muskegon, Michigan, U.S
- Capacity: About 1,000

Construction
- Opened: 1916

Tenants
- Muskegon Reds (1916); Muskegon Muskies (1917-1922); Muskegon Anglers (1923-1924); Muskegon Lassies (1946-1950); Muskegon Belles (1953); Muskegon Clippers (2014-Current)

Marsh Field is a baseball field in Muskegon, Michigan, United States. The field has been home to many professional teams in the past, and is now used as part of developmental baseball leagues. Some notable teams to call Marsh Field home include the Muskegon Clippers, a now defunct farm team of the New York Yankees, the Muskegon Belles, an All-American Girls Professional Baseball League team for the 1953 season, the Muskegon Lassies, an AAGPBL team that played at Marsh Field from 1946–1950, and the Outwin Zephyrs, a Negro league baseball team.

Currently, Marsh Field is used by the Great Lakes Summer Collegiate League's Muskegon Clippers (no relation to the previous farm team), the Muskegon City League, the Muskegon Big Reds baseball team, and is used as part of the Extra Innings Muskegon Fall Baseball league.

Frank Barnes, a major league catcher, played two seasons of minor league baseball at Marsh Field. He later played in Major League Baseball for the Yankees and the St. Louis Cardinals. He and Elston Howard were the first ever African-American players signed by the Yankees. Howard played one season at Marsh Field.
