= Ray Spencer =

English footballer (1933–2016)

Personal information
- Full name: Raymond Spencer
- Date of birth: 25 March 1933
- Place of birth: Kings Norton, England
- Date of death: 2016 (aged 82–83)
- Position: Wing half

Youth career
- 19??–1950: Aston Villa

Senior career*
Years	Team	Apps	(Gls)
1950–1958	Aston Villa	0	(0)
1958–1961	Darlington	97	(5)
1961–1964	Torquay United	59	(1)
1964–1965	Bath City		
1965–196?	Bridgwater Town		
- * Club domestic league appearances and goals

Raymond Spencer (25 March 1933 – 2016) was an English professional footballer who made 156 appearances in the Football League playing as a wing half or centre half for Darlington and Torquay United. He began his career with Aston Villa without playing for their first team, and went on to play non-league football for Bath City and Bridgwater Town. He represented England at schoolboy level.

== Life and career ==
Raymond Spencer was born in Kings Norton, Birmingham, on 25 March 1933. He played at inside left for England schoolboys against their Welsh counterparts at Highfield Road, Coventry, in 1948; a match preview described him as "a born footballer who uses his head and both feet." His younger brother Malcolm, also a schoolboy international, was on the books of Wolverhampton Wanderers but never went on to League football.

Spencer joined Aston Villa as a junior, and turned professional in June 1950. After four years with no first-team appearances, Villa listed him on a free transfer, but changed their minds and re-engaged him. Despite remaining a Villa player for a further four years, which included a spell of National Service in the Royal Air Force, he never made the first team.

He signed for Darlington, and finally made his Football League debut just days short of his 25th birthday, on 19 March 1958 in a 2–1 defeat at home to Southport in the Third Division North. His first senior goal arrived three days later, again in a home defeat, this time against Chester. His progress was interrupted when he broke a leg during a match in October 1958 and was out for five months, but once restored to fitness, he was a regular in the side playing mainly at left half or centre half for the next two years. His Darlington career is best remembered for his opening goal in the shock defeat of First Division team West Ham United in the inaugural season of the League Cup. The Daily Mirror reported how, "after only twenty seconds, [Lance Robson] swung the ball over to inside right Bobby Baxter, who teed it up for left half Ray Spencer to slam in a glorious goal from thirty yards (27 m)." Spencer made 106 appearances for Darlington and scored seven goals.

In June 1961, Spencer joined Torquay United. Although Darlington manager Eddie Carr thought he was worth more than the small fee received, the player wanted to relocate to his wife's home town and the club were "doing a good turn to a good club man." He made 59 league appearances for Torquay, scoring once, in three years at the club. He moved into non-league football, first with Bath City, for which he made 10 appearances in all competitions, and then with Bridgwater Town.

Spencer was married to Maeve. He died in 2016.

== Sources ==
- Tweddle, Frank (2000). The Definitive Darlington F.C. Nottingham: Soccerdata. ISBN 978-1-899468-15-7.
