= Muskegon Reds =

- 1884–1951; (1884, 1890, 1902, 1910–1914, 1916–1917, 1920–1924, 1926, 1934, 1940–1941, 1948–1951); Muskegon, Michigan

Minor league affiliations
- Previous classes: Class A, Class D, Class C, Class B
- Previous leagues: Michigan State League (1890–1902, 1911–1914, 1926, 1940–1941); Central League (1916–1922, 1926, 1934, 1948–1951); Michigan-Ontario League (1923–1924); Northwestern League (1884)

Major league affiliations
- Previous teams: New York Yankees (1950-1951); Chicago White Sox (1948–1949); Detroit Tigers (1940–1941)

Team data
- Name: Muskegon Reds (1902, 1911, 1916, 1926, 1934, 1940–1941, 1951); Muskegon Clippers (1948–1950); Muskegon Anglers (1923–1924); Muskegon Muskies (1917, 1920–1922); Muskegon Speeders (1912–1914)*; Muskegon Speed Boys (1910)
- Ballpark: Marsh Field

The Muskegon Reds was the primary name of the minor league baseball franchise in Muskegon, Michigan that existed on-and-off from 1890 to 1951.

== History ==
Muskegon played in the Michigan State League (1890–1902, 1911–1914, 1926, 1940–1941), Central League (1916–1922, 1926, 1934, 1948–1951), Michigan-Ontario League (1923–1924) and the Northwestern League (1884). The franchise was affiliated with the Detroit Tigers (1940–1941), and as the Muskegon Clippers with the Chicago White Sox (1948–1949) and the New York Yankees (1950-1951).

The team shared their colors moniker with Muskegon High School.

== The ballpark ==
Muskegon teams played at historic Marsh Field, built in 1916 and named a State of Michigan historic landmark. Today, it is the home of the Muskegon Clippers, who revived the previous Muskegon moniker and play in the Great Lakes Summer Collegiate League.

== Notable Muskegon alumni ==
- Bucky Harris (1916) Inducted Baseball Hall of Fame, 1975
- Red Ruffing (1949, MGR) Inducted Baseball Hall of Fame, 1967
- Bud Clancy (1924)
- Buck Crouse (1921-1923)
- Freddie Fitzsimmons (1920-1922) 217 MLB wins
- Alex Grammas (1949)
- Elston Howard (1950) 12 x MLB All-Star; 1963 AL Most Valuable Player
- Doc Lavan (1912)
- Johnny Lipon (1941)
- Stubby Overmire (1941)
- Doc White (1920) NL ERA Leader

== Year-by-year records ==
Year	Record	Finish	Manager	Playoffs	Notes
1911	73–45	2nd	Arthur DeBaker	No playoffs held	
1916	55–77	8th	Bade Myers	No playoffs held	
1926	12–13	3rd	Curtis "Buck" Wheat	--	Central League merged with Michigan–Ontario League; June 13 to form Michigan State League
	39–56	6th	Curtis "Buck" Wheat	No Playoffs held	Michigan State League began on June 15
1934	4–9	--	Cy Boothby	Team disbanded May 30	
1940	49–57	5th	Jack Tighe	No playoffs held	
1941	61–57	4th	Jack Tighe	No playoffs held	
1951	86–54	2nd	Jim Gleeson	No playoffs held	
