= Buck Crouse =

American baseball player (1897–1983)

Clyde "Bucky" Crouse
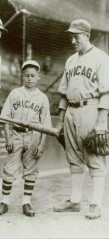
- Buck Crouse, with son Joe
- Catcher
- Born: January 6, 1897; Anderson, Indiana, U.S.
- Died: October 23, 1983 (aged 86); Muncie, Indiana, U.S.
- Batted: Left Threw: Right

MLB debut
- August 1, 1923, for the Chicago White Sox

Last MLB appearance
- September 28, 1930, for the Chicago White Sox

MLB statistics
- Batting average: .262
- Home runs: 8
- Runs batted in: 160
- Stats at Baseball Reference

Teams
- Chicago White Sox (1923–1930)

Career highlights and awards
- 1929 Cotton State League MVP; 1937 International League MVP

Clyde Ellsworth "Buck" Crouse (January 6, 1897 – October 23, 1983) was an American catcher in Major League Baseball.

== Early career ==
"Bucky" Crouse was born on a farm in Madison County, Indiana and moved to Muncie, Indiana as a boy. He began his professional baseball career in 1921 with the Jackson Mayors team in the Michigan Central League. When they folded a year later, he joined the Muskegan Club in the Michigan–Ontario League.

== Major league career ==
=== Chicago White Sox ===
The American League Chicago White Sox purchased Crouse in the middle of the 1923 season. In Chicago, he began his longtime association with Hall of Famers Ray Schalk, whom he backed up as a catcher, and pitcher Ted Lyons, who preferred Crouse over any other catcher. Crouse served as backup to Schalk through 1926, and the next two seasons as part of a catching tandem with Harry McCurdy and Moe Berg. His best season was in 1925, when he led the team in hitting with a .351 in 54 games, but he was best known for his strong arm and defensive abilities. He averaged nearly one assist per game, an unusually high figure.

== Late minor league career ==
=== Buffalo Bisons ===
Crouse left the White Sox in 1931 to play for Schalk, now the manager of the Buffalo Bisons International League team. Because of his hustle and defensive prowess, he was one of Buffalo's most popular players. While with the Herd he caught two no-hit games, and during the 1935 pennant race he caught 32 straight games, including five double headers in six days. His fielding average was .984 (only 8 errors in 499 chances).

He was honored with "Bucky Crouse Night" in front of over 13,000 fans at Offermann Stadium and was later inducted into the Buffalo Hall of Fame.

=== Baltimore Orioles ===
In 1937, Crouse took over May 20 as player-manager for the struggling International League Baltimore Orioles, after being traded for George Savino and cash. In his first showing as a manager, he batted a solid .288 and led the Flock out of the league cellar into the first division and the Governors' Cup series. They finished fourth, losing to the Newark Bears in the playoffs.

He was widely recognized by players, writers and officials for his inspirational leadership, and was again honored with "Bucky Crouse Night" at Oriole Park. That year he was named The Sporting News' Most Valuable Player of the International League. At age 40 and a grandfather, he was the oldest player ever to receive this honor. It was the highlight of his 17-year career. At the celebration, he received a trophy, the key to the city, a bag of money and a new car.

== Coaching ==
In 1939, Crouse signed to catch for the Little Rock Travelers, of the Southern Association, but asked to be released to manage the Montgomery team of the Southeastern League. He pulled the Montgomery club up and led them into the playoffs but did not like the deep South. He finished his career coaching at Indianapolis of the American Association in 1940.

== Retirement from baseball ==
Returning to Muncie, Crouse worked for the Hemingray Glass Company and later for the Acme-Lees Company, an automobile moldings manufacturer. He occasionally played for the Muncie Citizens, a semi-professional team.

Crouse, who died at age 86, is enshrined in the Indiana Baseball Hall of Fame (Class of 1981), the Buffalo Bison Hall of Fame and the Delaware County Athletic Hall of Fame.

== Sources ==
- Indiana Baseball Hall of Fame
- Interview with baseball player Bucky Crouse conducted by Eugene C. Murdock on Nov 1, 1974, in Muncie, Ind. (3 hr., in two parts): Part 1 of 2, Part 2 of 2
