= Pop Schriver =

American baseball player (1865–1932)

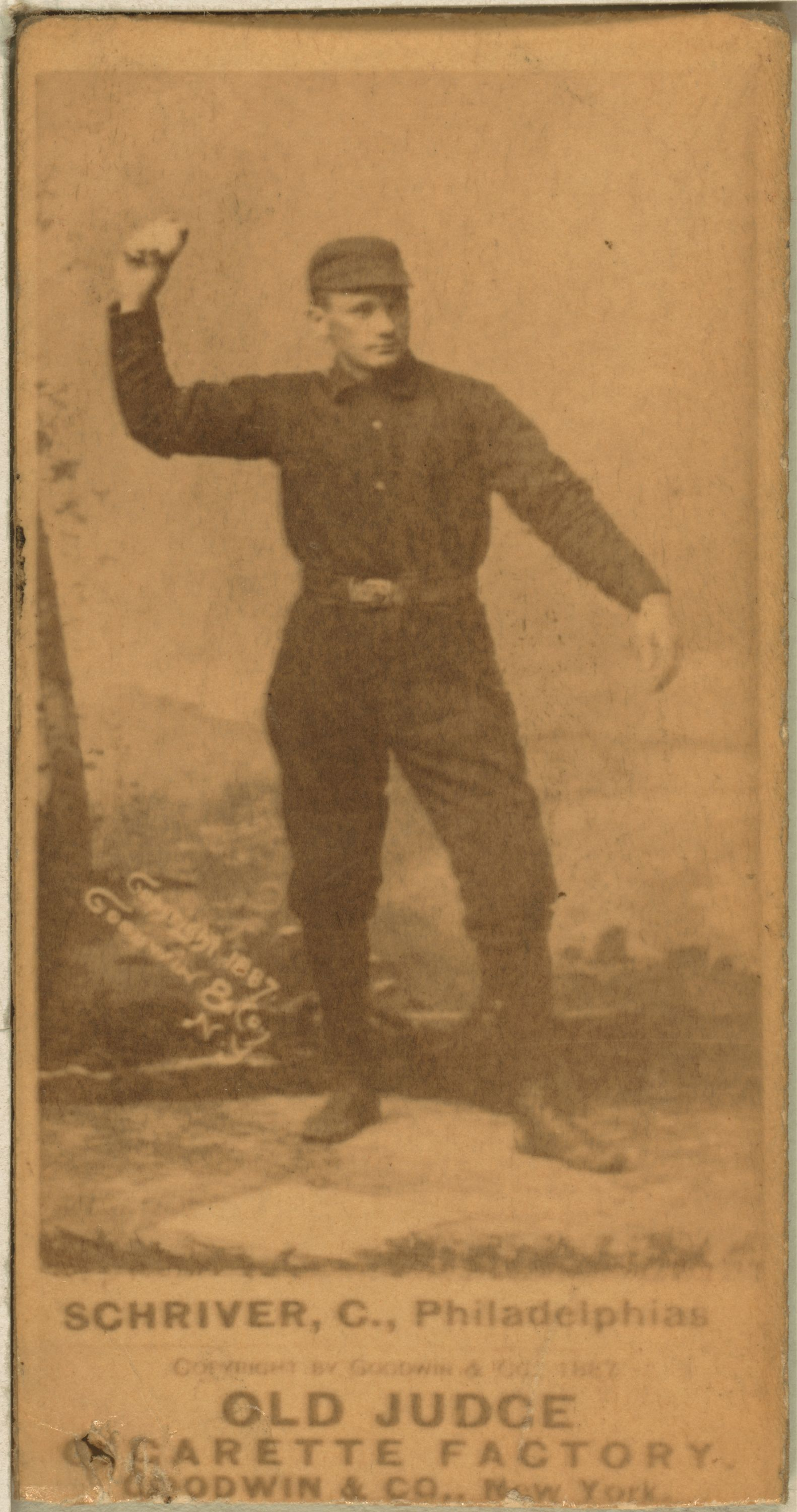
- Catcher
- Born: July 11, 1865; Brooklyn, New York, US
- Died: December 27, 1932 (aged 67); New York City, US
- Batted: Right Threw: Right

MLB debut
- April 29, 1886, for the Brooklyn Grays

Last MLB appearance
- October 6, 1901, for the St. Louis Cardinals

MLB statistics
- Batting average: .264
- Hits: 720
- Runs scored: 367
- Stats at Baseball Reference

Teams
- Brooklyn Grays (1886); Philadelphia Quakers / Phillies (1888–1890); Chicago Colts (1891–1894); New York Giants (1895); Cincinnati Reds (1897); Pittsburgh Pirates (1898–1900); St. Louis Cardinals (1901)

William Frederick "Pop" Schriver (July 11, 1865 – December 27, 1932) born in Brooklyn, New York, was an American baseball catcher for the Brooklyn Grays (1886), Philadelphia Quakers/Philadelphia Phillies (1888–90), Chicago Colts (1891–94), New York Giants (1895), Cincinnati Reds (1897), Pittsburgh Pirates (1898–1900) and St. Louis Cardinals (1901).

In 14 seasons he played in 800 games, had 2,727 at bats, 367 runs, 720 hits, 117 doubles, 40 triples, 16 home runs, 375 RBIs, 46 stolen bases, 223 walks, .264 batting average, .329 on-base percentage, .354 slugging percentage, 965 total bases and 33 sacrifice hits.

He died in New York City.

A Washington Post article reported on August 26, 1894, that on the 25th, "Pop" Schriver caught a ball tossed by his teammate Clark Griffith from the observation deck of the Washington Monument (505 feet). Griffith reported later that Schriver "couldn't hold it and it plopped out," so Schriver's claim to the first catch from the Monument is questioned. The feat was successfully completed by Washington Senators catcher Charles E. "Gabby" Street on Aug. 21, 1908.

== Sources ==
- Career statistics from Baseball Reference · Fangraphs · Retrosheet · Baseball Almanac
