= Paul Wachtel =

American baseball player (1888-1964)

- Pitcher
- Born: April 30, 1888; Myersville, Maryland, U.S.
- Died: December 15, 1964 (aged 76); San Antonio, Texas, U.S.
- Batted: Right Threw: Right

MLB debut
- September 18, 1917, for the Brooklyn Robins

Last MLB appearance
- September 27, 1917, for the Brooklyn Robins

MLB statistics
- Win–loss record: 0–0
- Earned run average: 10.50
- Strikeouts: 3
- Stats at Baseball Reference

Teams
- Brooklyn Robins (1917)

Paul Horine Wachtel (April 30, 1888 – December 15, 1964) was an American pitcher in Major League Baseball. He pitched in two games for the 1917 Brooklyn Robins.

Wachtel was born in Myersville, Maryland. He played 13 seasons in the minors in the Texas League and holds the league records for career wins (231), complete games (242), shutouts (32) and total innings pitched (3,177). He won 20 or more games six times in the Texas League and is a member of the Texas League Hall of Fame. He died, aged 76, in San Antonio, Texas.
