= Jack Hendricks =

American baseball player and manager (1875-1943)

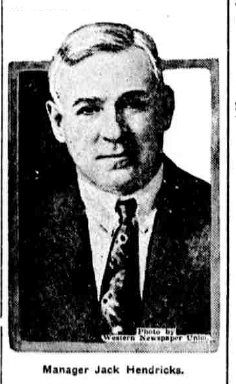
- Outfielder / Manager
- Born: April 9, 1875; Joliet, Illinois, U.S.
- Died: May 13, 1943 (aged 68); Chicago, Illinois, U.S.
- Batted: Left Threw: Left

MLB debut
- June 12, 1902, for the New York Giants

Last MLB appearance
- September 28, 1903, for the Washington Senators

MLB statistics
- Batting average: .207
- Runs batted in: 4
- Managerial record: 520–528
- Winning %: .496
- Stats at Baseball Reference
- Managerial record at Baseball Reference

Teams
- As player: New York Giants (1902); Chicago Orphans (1902); Washington Senators (1903); As manager: St. Louis Cardinals (1918); Cincinnati Reds (1924–1929)

John Charles Hendricks (April 9, 1875 – May 13, 1943) was an American professional baseball player and manager. He played parts of two seasons in Major League Baseball as an outfielder, but is best known as the manager of the Cincinnati Reds from 1924 to 1929.

== Playing career ==
Hendricks' brief playing career consisted of half a game with the New York Giants and two with the Chicago Orphans in 1902, and 32 games with the Washington Senators in 1903 following the death of Ed Delahanty.

== Managerial career ==
After retiring as a player, he started managing in the minor leagues, eventually getting his major league opportunity when Miller Huggins was fired by the St. Louis Cardinals after the 1917 season. After a 51–78 record and a last-place finish, Hendricks quit. In the 1924 season, the Reds had reported to spring training in Orlando, Florida when their manager Pat Moran died of Bright's disease. Hendricks, who had resigned his post as athletic director of the Knights of Columbus to become a Reds coach that year, took over the club. His best finish as manager was second place in the 1926 season, behind his former team, the Cardinals. He was fired in 1929 after a seventh-place finish. His overall managerial record was 520–528 (.496).

Hendricks held a law degree from Northwestern University Law School and was admitted to the bar in the state of Illinois. Hendricks was one of a select group of major league managers to hold a law degree or pass a state bar. Other include James Henry O'Rourke, Miller Huggins, Branch Rickey (his successor in St. Louis), John Montgomery Ward, Hughie Jennings, Muddy Ruel, and Tony La Russa.

== Death ==
Hendricks died in Chicago at age 68.
