= Larry LeJeune =

American baseball player (1885–1952)

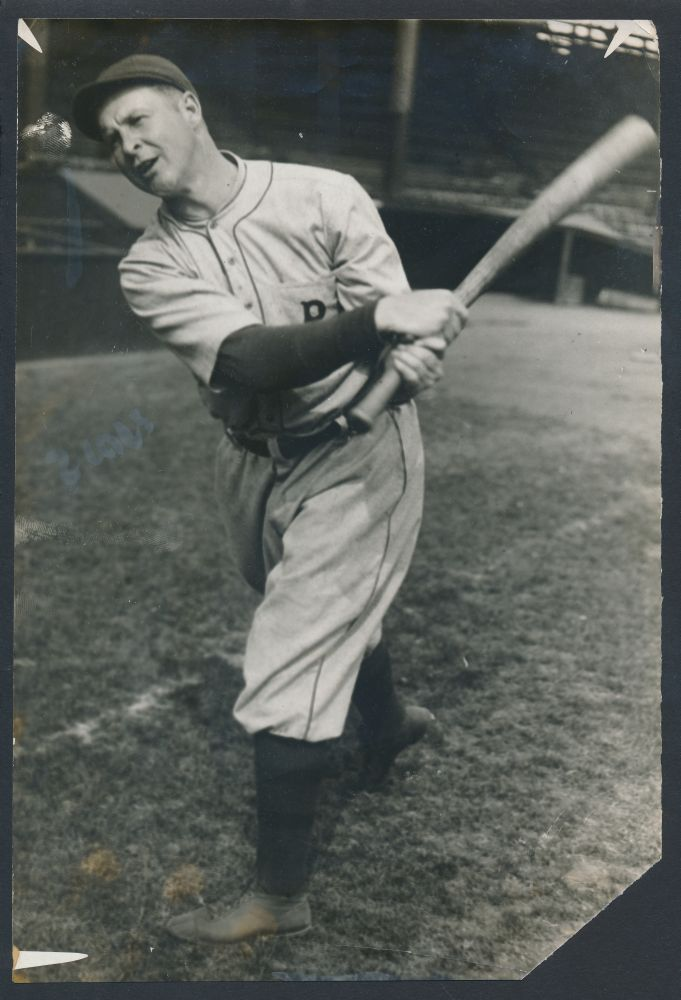
- Outfielder
- Born: July 22, 1885; Chicago, Illinois, U.S.
- Died: April 21, 1952 (aged 66); Eloise, Michigan, U.S.
- Batted: Right Threw: Right

MLB debut
- May 10, 1911, for the Brooklyn Dodgers

Last MLB appearance
- May 3, 1915, for the Pittsburgh Pirates

MLB statistics
- Batting average: .167
- Hits: 14
- Runs batted in: 4
- Stats at Baseball Reference

Teams
- Brooklyn Dodgers (1911); Pittsburgh Pirates (1915)

Sheldon Adalbert "Larry" LeJeune (July 22, 1885–April 21, 1952) was an American Major League Baseball outfielder who played parts of two seasons in the major leagues for the Brooklyn Dodgers and the Pittsburgh Pirates.

In 1910, at a competition in Cincinnati, LeJeune threw a baseball 426 1/2 feet (130.0 m), setting a world record.
