= Goat Anderson =

American baseball player (1880–1923)

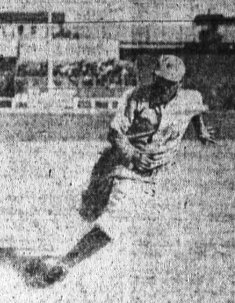
- Right fielder / Second baseman
- Born: January 13, 1880; Cleveland, Ohio, U.S.
- Died: March 15, 1923 (aged 43); South Bend, Indiana, U.S.
- Batted: Left Threw: Right

MLB debut
- April 11, 1907, for the Pittsburgh Pirates

Last MLB appearance
- October 6, 1907, for the Pittsburgh Pirates

MLB statistics
- Batting average: .206
- Home runs: 1
- Runs batted in: 12
- Stolen bases: 27
- Stats at Baseball Reference

Teams
- Pittsburgh Pirates (1907)

Edward John "Goat" Anderson (January 13, 1880 – March 15, 1923) was an American professional baseball outfielder with the Pittsburgh Pirates of Major League Baseball. He played one season with the Pirates in 1907. The 27-year-old rookie batted left-handed and threw right-handed.

The 1907 Pirates finished second in the National League (NL) with a 91–63 record, 17 games behind the pennant-winning Chicago Cubs. Anderson, a native of Cleveland, Ohio, started in the majority of Pittsburgh's games that season, usually in right field. He batted .206 in 127 games, well below the NL average of .243. The 80 bases on balls he drew (fifth in the league), however, along with 6 hit by pitches, gave him an on-base percentage of .343, well above the NL average of .308. 1907 was his only season in the major leagues.

He finished the year with 1 home run, 12 runs batted in, and 27 stolen bases. His 73 runs scored ranked eighth in the National League.

Anderson scored 73 runs on 85 hits, or one run for every 1.164 hits, the 18th lowest total in major league history.

Anderson died of stomach cancer at the age of 43 in South Bend, Indiana.
