= Wheeling Stogies =

- 1877–1934; Wheeling, West Virginia

Minor league affiliations
- Previous classes: Class C (1925–1934); Class B (1903–1924); Class A (1901); Class B (1899–1900); Class F (1898); Class B (1897); Class C (1895–1896)
- League: Middle Atlantic League (1925–1934)
- Previous leagues: Central League (1915–1916); Interstate League (III) (1913); Central League (1903–1912); Western Association (1901); Central League (1899–1900); Ohio State League (1898); Interstate League I (1895–1897); Iron And Oil League (1895); Tri-State League (1888–1890); Ohio State League (1887); League Alliance (1877)

Major league affiliations
- Previous teams: New York Yankees (1933–1934)

Minor league titles
- League titles: 2 (1909, 1910)

Team data
- Previous names: Wheeling Stogies (1899–1901, 1903–1916, 1925–1934); Wheeling Nailers (1896–1898); Wheeling Mountaineers (1895); Wheeling (1895); Wheeling National Citys/Nailers (1888–1890); Wheeling (1887); Wheeling Standard (1877)
- Previous parks: Breitstein Park (1915); Wheeling Island (1877–1913)

The Wheeling Stogies was a minor league baseball team based in Wheeling, West Virginia, that played under several different names at various times between 1877 and 1934. They played mostly in the Central League and the Middle Atlantic League, as well as in several various other area-based leagues.

== History ==
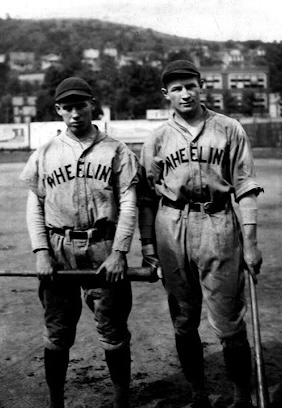
Art and Dan Rooney playing for the Stogies in 1925

The Stogies can be traced back to 1877 and the city's first professional team known as Wheeling Standard, which featured Jack Glasscock and Chappy Lane. Then in 1887 the city once again fielded a new team known simply in the record books as Wheeling. However, the following season, Wheeling came to be called the "Nail City" for its nail industry, creating the Wheeling Nailers, a team name which even today is used for the city's professional ice hockey team. The team was also known as the Wheeling National Citys, and in 1895 as the Wheeling Mountaineers, which consisted of future major leaguers: Tom O'Brien and Dewey McDougal. The town also had a thriving tobacco industry with Marsh Wheeling's Stogies as a leading enterprise, and later the club's name changed to the Wheeling Stogies in 1899.

In 1900 Ed Poole went 20–15 for the Wheeling Stogies. He also played in the infield and outfield when he didn't pitch and batted .257. Poole was then acquired by the Pittsburgh Pirates and made his major league debut in October of that year. He was a member of the Pirates National League pennant winning team in 1901.

Under manager Bill Phillips, the club won Central League titles in 1909 and 1910. The Stogies' 1909 season featured Hall of Fame inductee, Bill McKechnie. The 1909 season also featured several memorable exhibition games. The first was against a barnstorming team led by baseball great Cap Anson his semi-professional team, which he called "Anson's Colts". The Colts defeated the Stogies 10-4 with Anson going 1-5 and scoring a run for the Colts, while Bill McKechnie went 1-4 with a run for Wheeling. The Stogies also faced the New York Giants and the Philadelphia Athletics that season, losing 7-2 and 3-0 respectively. However, on April 8, 1909, the Stogies defeated the Athletics 5-4 in front of just 250 fans at Wheeling. The Pittsburgh Pirates purchased McKechnie from Wheeling at the end of the season. However, to close out the 1909 season, the Pirates, who had just won the 1909 World Series, and the Central League champions played against each other in an exhibition game in Wheeling. The Stogies defeated the Pirates 9-1; however, the Pittsburgh club played many back-up players in the game.

Following their 1912 season, the Central League revoked the Wheeling franchise, after the club experienced serious financial difficulty. During the 1912 season the Central League went to a 12-team league, and increased monthly salaries from $1,500 to $2,100. This caused only 4 of the league's teams to profit. As a result, Wheeling and the 5 easternmost teams were cut from the league.

Wheeling and the other five teams then formed the third Interstate League. However, flooding and financial hardship forced two of the league's clubs in Ohio to fold, and the league ended operations on July 21, 1913. The following season, Wheeling did not field a team. However, on February 22, 1915, the team was reorganized and was once again a member of the Central League. The new team featured Goat Anderson and future 1919 World Series winner and Philadelphia Eagles football coach, Greasy Neale. Despite having Neale in the line-up the 1915 season, the team finished near the bottom of the standings. The following season Neale was sold to the Cincinnati Reds of the National League. The team finished in fourth place during the 1916 season. However, the team folded again in 1917 due to struggles associated with World War I.

The Stogies once again took to the field in 1925, as a member of the Middle Atlantic League. During this time, the team included brothers Dan and Art Rooney. Art, an outfielder, led the team in games played, runs scored, hits and stolen bases. However, he would be more famous for his efforts in football as the founder of the Pittsburgh Steelers of the National Football League in 1933. He would become a member of the Pro Football Hall of Fame in 1964. Meanwhile, Dan played at catcher and would later change his name to Silas and become a Franciscan priest.

== Legacy ==
In June 2004, the Washington Wild Things of the independent Frontier League wore Stogies jerseys to honor the team against the Chillicothe Paints.
