= Owen Shannon =

American baseball player (1879-1918)

- Catcher
- Born: December 22, 1879; Omaha, Nebraska, U.S.
- Died: April 10, 1918 (aged 38); Omaha, Nebraska, U.S.
- Batted: Right Threw: Right

MLB debut
- September 5, 1903, for the St. Louis Browns

Last MLB appearance
- August 24, 1907, for the Washington Senators

MLB statistics
- Batting average: .200
- Home runs: 0
- Runs batted in: 3
- Stats at Baseball Reference

Teams
- St. Louis Browns (1903); Washington Senators (1907)

Owen Dennis Ignatius Shannon (December 22, 1879 – April 10, 1918) was an American professional baseball catcher. He played parts of two seasons in Major League Baseball for the St. Louis Browns and Washington Senators.
