= Bade Myers =

Baseball player and manager (1872–1940)

- Born: December 21, 1872; Bellefontaine, Ohio, U.S.
- Died: September 18, 1940 (aged 67); Allen County, Indiana, U.S.
- Batted: Right Threw: Right

William Myers, nicknamed Bade (born December 21, 1872 – September 18, 1940) was an American baseball player and manager. He was a prominent figure in minor league baseball for many years. He played professionally for 20 seasons and managed for over a decade as well. He was born in Bellefontaine, Ohio.

== Playing career ==
A catcher and first baseman, Myers played from 1896 to 1915, spending most of his career at the B-level of minor league baseball. He spent much of his career playing for Ohio-based teams in cities like Toledo, Dayton and Columbus.

Myers' statistical record is incomplete; however, it is known that he played at least 1,757 games and had at least 1,755 hits.

== Managing career ==
Myers managed from 1903 to 1917, leading three teams to first-place finishes and de facto league championships. He led the Fort Wayne Railroaders to the top of the standings in 1903 and 1904 and the Quincy Vets to first place in 1910.

Myers also scouted for the St. Louis Federals and Cleveland Indians.
