= Jack Knight (baseball) =

American baseball player (1895–1976)

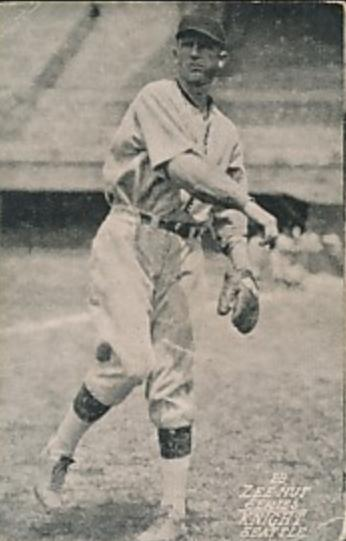
- Pitcher
- Born: January 12, 1895; Pittsboro, Mississippi, U.S.
- Died: July 30, 1976 (aged 81); San Antonio, Texas, U.S.
- Batted: Left Threw: Right

MLB debut
- September 20, 1922, for the St. Louis Cardinals

Last MLB appearance
- April 25, 1927, for the Boston Braves

MLB statistics
- Record: 10-18
- Earned run average: 6.85
- Strikeouts: 49
- Stats at Baseball Reference

Teams
- St. Louis Cardinals (1922); Philadelphia Phillies (1925–1926); Boston Braves (1927)

Elmer Russell "Jack" Knight (January 12, 1895 – July 30, 1976) was an American right-handed pitcher in Major League Baseball. Born in Pittsboro, Mississippi, he played from 1922 to 1927, pitching in 72 games for the St. Louis Cardinals, Philadelphia Phillies and Boston Braves.

He worked as a minor-league manager for the Cleveland Indians, Brooklyn Dodgers, and Chicago Cubs for several years after his playing career ended. He died at age 81 in San Antonio, Texas.
