= Peoria Distillers =

US minor league baseball team

- 1894–1917; Peoria, Illinois

Minor league affiliations
- League: Western Association (1894-1896); Central League (1900, 1904-1917); Western League (1902-1903); Three-I League (1905-1917)

Minor league titles
- League titles (2): 1911; 1916

Team data
- Ballpark: Lake View Park

The Peoria Distillers were a minor league baseball team that existed on-and-off from 1894 to 1917. They played in the Western Association from 1894 to 1896; the Central League in 1900, 1904 and 1917; the Western League from 1902 to 1903; and the Three-I League from 1905 to 1917. The team was the second baseball team to play in Peoria. They played in Lake View Park.

== Management ==
Under managers David Drohan and Charley Stis, they won their first League Championship in 1911. In 1916, they won their second and final League Championship under the guidance of William Jackson.

Pants Rowland was the Peoria team's manager in 1913, then was hired by Charles Comiskey to be manager of the Chicago White Sox. He guided them to the 1917 World Series championship, the last one won by the White Sox until 2005.

== Notable players ==
Joe McGinnity, nicknamed "Iron Man," who would go on to have a long career in the Major Leagues and be inducted in the National Baseball Hall of Fame, pitched every inning of a 21-inning game for the Peoria Distillers in 1898. His manager in Peoria was Pat Wright.

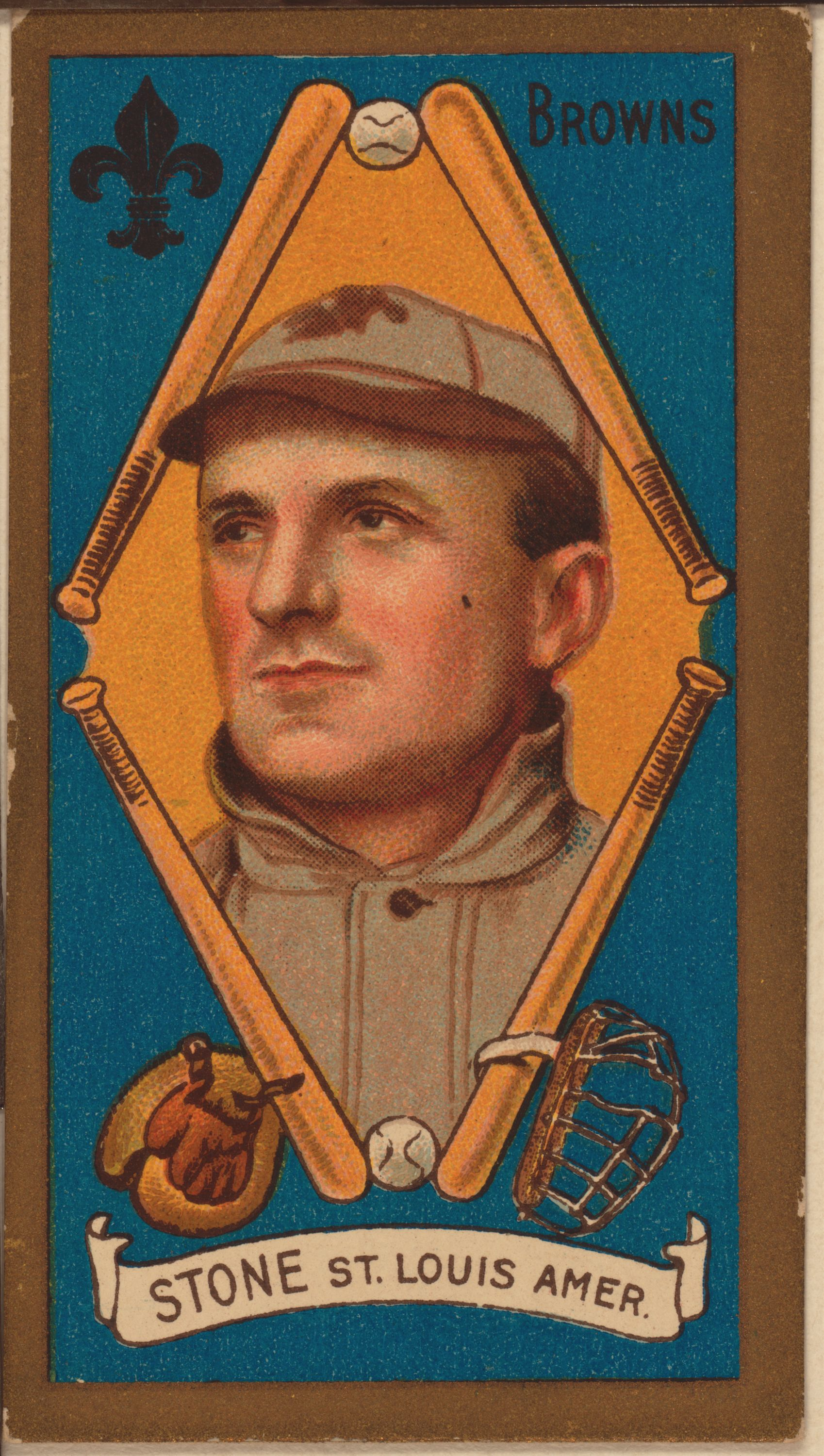
George Stone

Others who played for the Distillers in the 19th century and proceeded to the majors included Harry Bay, Jimmy Burke, Frank Dillon, Frank Donnelly, Dan Dugdale, Hi Ebright, Zaza Harvey, John Roach and Harry Truby. In 1902 George Stone, who later was the 1906 American League batting champion, played for the team. In 1913, outfielder Max Flack played for the Distillers, and would go on to play for St. Louis in the 1918 World Series.

== Legacy ==
The Peoria Chiefs will occasionally play as the Peoria Distillers, sell throwback jerseys, and decorate the stadium with historic pictures of Distillers players.
