= Evansville Evas =

- 1887–1931; (1887, 1889–1892 1895–1897, 1901–1931); Evansville, Indiana

Minor league affiliations
- Class: Class B (1895, 1902–1911; 1913–1917; 1919–1931); Class C (1897); Class D(1901, 1912)
- League: League Alliance (1887); Central Interstate League (1889-1890); Interstate League (1891); Northwestern League (1891); Illinois-Indiana League (1892); Southern League (1895); Central League (1897); Illinois–Indiana–Iowa League (1901–1902); Central League (1903–1911); Kentucky-Illinois-Tennessee League (1912); Central League (1913–1917); Illinois–Indiana–Iowa League (1919–1931)

Major league affiliations
- Team: Detroit Tigers (1928–1931)

Minor league titles
- League titles (2): 1908; 1915

Team data
- Name: Evansville Red (1887); Evansville Hoosiers (1889–1892); Evansville Blackbirds (1895); Evansville Brewers (1897); Evansville River Rats (1901–1910); Evansville Strikers (1911); Evansville Yankees (1912); Evansville River Rats (1913–1915); Evansville Evas (1916–1920); Evansville Black Sox (1921); Evansville Evas (1922–1923); Evansville Little Evas (1924); Evansville Pocketeers (1925); Evansville Hubs (1926–1931)
- Ballpark: Louisiana Street Park (1895–1914); Bosse Field (1915–1931)

The Evansville Evas was a primary nickname of an early minor league baseball team in Evansville, Indiana between 1877 and 1931. Early Evansville teams played as members of the League Alliance (1887), Central Interstate League (1889–1890), Interstate League (1891), Northwestern League (1891), Illinois-Indiana League (1892), Southern League (1895), Central League (1897), Illinois–Indiana–Iowa League (1901–1902), Central League (1903–1911), Kentucky-Illinois-Tennessee League (1912), Central League (1913–1917) and Illinois–Indiana–Iowa League (1919–1931). Evansville was a minor league affiliate of the Detroit Tigers from 1928 to 1931.

Beginning in 1915, Evansville has hosted home games at Bosse Field, which is the third oldest baseball stadium in the United States, still in use today by the Evansville Otters of the Frontier League.

Baseball Hall of Fame members Hank Greenberg (1931), Chuck Klein (1927) and Edd Roush (1912–1913) played for Evansville during the early era, joining Warren Spahn as Evansville alumni inducted into the Hall of Fame.

The Evansville Evas and Hubs directly preceded the 1938 Evansville Bees, who rejoined the Illinois–Indiana–Iowa League.

== History ==
After early Evansville minor league teams began play in 1887 as the Evansville Red, other teams followed in the late 1800s: Evansville Hoosiers (1889–1892; 1896), Evansville Brewers (1897) and the 1895 Evansville Blackbirds of the Southern Association.

It was reported that the Evansville Blackbirds were facing financial difficulties. As a result, the team began throwing games, allegedly for $1,500.00 per game.

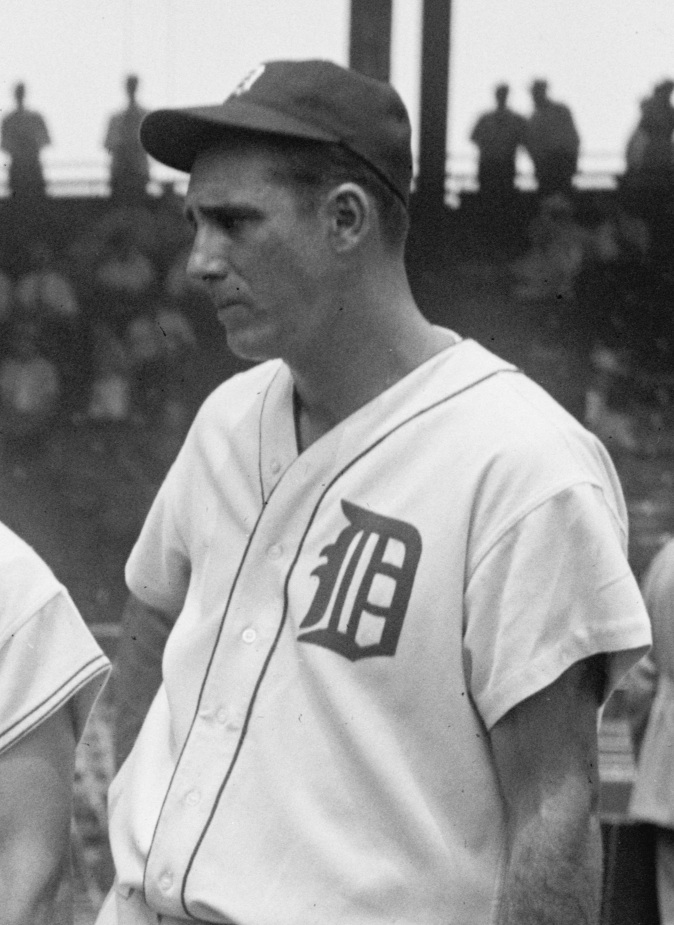
Hank Greenberg

In 1901, the Evansville River Rats began league play in the new Class D level Illinois–Indiana–Iowa League (Three-I) as a 1901 charter franchise. Evansville joined the Bloomington Blues, Cedar Rapids Rabbitts, Davenport River Rats, Decatur Commodores, Rock Island Islanders, Rockford Red Sox and Terre Haute Hottentots as charter members in the new league. Bloomington, Illinois, Decatur, Illinois and Terre Haute, Indiana left the Central League to join, while Evansville and the others were new franchises.

On July 29, 1906, Evans James Freeman, threw a no-hitter in a 2–0 victory over Terre Haute, with 7 walks and 10 strikeouts. On May 10, 1910, Evansville River Rats pitcher Bill Cristall pitched an 11–inning no-hitter in a losing effort. Cristall lost by the score of 1–0 to the Grand Rapids Raiders in an 11 inning game. Evansville had a third no–hitter when River Rats pitcher Paul Paul Fitterly threw a no–hitter against the Terre Haute Terre-iers on August 6, 1913, in a 5–0 Evansville victory. Evas pitcher Paul Winchell threw the fourth franchise no–hitter in a 1–0 Evansville victory over the Springfield Reapers on August 3, 1916. The fifth no–hitter was thrown by Tom Karnaghan on May 13, 1917, in a 1–0 Evansville Evas win over the South Bend Benders. The sixth franchise no–hitter was thrown by Evas pitcher Frank Winchell on August 22, 1919, as Evansville defeated the Moline Plowboys 2–0.

Over the next thirty years, the team shifted names and leagues as the Evansville Hubs (1926–1931), Evansville Evas (1916–1923), Evansville Little Evas (1924), Evansville Pocketeers (1925), Evansville Strikers (1911), Evansville Yankees (1912) and original Evansville River Rats (1913–1917; 1901–1910) took the field in Evansville. The Evansville teams played in the Illinois–Indiana–Iowa League (1901–1902; 1919–1931), Central League (1903–1911; 1913–1917) and Kentucky-Illinois-Tennessee League (1912).

Evansville played as an affiliate of the Detroit Tigers from 1928 to 1931.

The Evansville franchise stopped play after the 1931 season during the Great Depression. Evansville was without baseball until the 1938 Evansville Bees returned to Illinois–Indiana–Iowa League play as an affiliate of the Bostin Braves/Boston Bees. That era of Evansville baseball ran through 1957.

Today, Evansville hosts the Evansville Otters of the Frontier League, who continue play at Bosse Field.

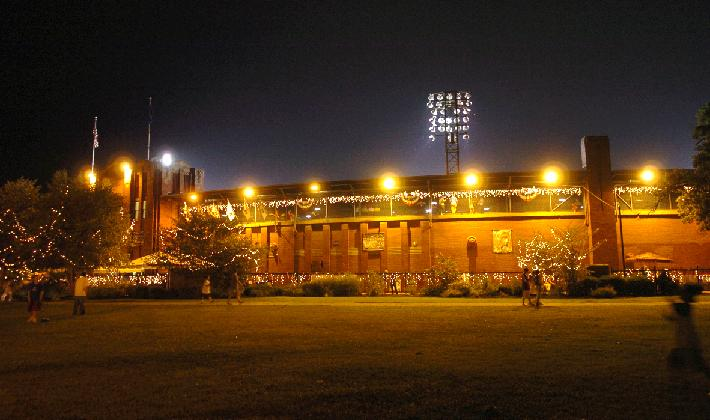
(2006) Bosse Field. Evansville, Indiana.

== The ballparks ==
Early Evansville teams played at Louisiana Street Park through 1914. Adjacent to the Evansville Union Stockyards and the Stockyard Hotel with a beer garden, the ballpark was built in 1895 and closed in 1960. The last minor league game was played at the park on June 16, 1915. The Louisiana Street baseball park was located at East Louisiana Street and Read Avenue.

Beginning in June 1915, Evansville minor league teams have played at Bosse Field. Built at a cost of $100,000, Bosse Filed was the first municipally owned stadium in organized baseball and is named for Evansville mayor, Benjamin Bosse, who helped design the ballpark. Still in use today, the ballpark is located at 1701 Main Street & Morgan Street in Evansville, Indiana. Bosse Field is currently home to the Evansville Otters in the independent Frontier League. Behind MLB's Fenway Park, which opened in 1912 and Wrigley Field, which opened in 1914, Bosse Field is the third oldest baseball park in the United States. The first game at Bosse Field was played on June 17, 1915.

== Timeline ==
Year(s)	# Yrs.	Team	Level	League	Affiliate
1887	1	Evansville Red	Independent	League Alliance	None
1889–1890	2	Evansville Hoosiers	Independent	Central Interstate League	None
1891 (1)	1	Evansville Hoosiers	Independent	Interstate League	None
1891 (2)	1	Evansville Hoosiers	Independent	Northwestern League	None
1892	1	Evansville Hoosiers	Independent	Illinois-Indiana League	None
1895	1	Evansville Blackbirds	Class B	Southern Association	None
1897	1	Evansville Brewers	Class C	Central League	None
1901	1	Evansville River Rats	Class D	Illinois–Indiana–Iowa League	None
1902–1910	9	Evansville River Rats	Class B	Illinois–Indiana–Iowa League	None
1911	1	Evansville Strikers	Class B	Central League	None
1912	1	Evansville Yankees	Class D	Kentucky-Illinois-Tennessee League	None
1913–1915	5	Evansville River Rats	Class B	Central League	None
1916–1917	2	Evansville Evas	Class B	Central League	None
1919–1920	2	Evansville Evas	Class B	Illinois–Indiana–Iowa League	None
1921	1	Evansville Black Sox	Class B	Illinois–Indiana–Iowa League	None
1922–1923	2	Evansville Evas	Class B	Illinois–Indiana–Iowa League	None
1924	1	Evansville Little Evas	Class B	Illinois–Indiana–Iowa League	None
1925	1	Evansville Pocketeers	Class B	Illinois–Indiana–Iowa League	None
1926–1927	2	Evansville Hubs	Class B	Illinois–Indiana–Iowa League	None
1928–1931	4	Evansville Hubs	Class B	Illinois–Indiana–Iowa League	Detroit Tigers

== Notable alumni ==
=== Baseball Hall of Fame alumni ===
- Hank Greenberg (1931) Inducted, 1956
- Chuck Klein (1927) Inducted, 1980
- Edd Roush (1912–1913) Inducted, 1962

=== Other notable alumni ===
- Tommy Bridges (1930) 6x MLB All-Star; 1936 AL wins leader; 2× AL strikeout leader (1935, 1936)
- Abner Dalrymple (1895) 1878 NL Batting Champion; 1885 NL Home Run Leader
- Pete Fox (1930) MLB All-Star
- Jimmy Ryan (1906) 1888 NL HR Leader
- Oscar Stanage (1926) MLB Fielding Records
- Gee Walker MLB All–Star (1928, 1930)
- Whit Wyatt (1928–1929) 4x MLB All-Star; 1941 NL wins leader

== See also ==
- Evansville Hoosiers players
- Evansville Hubs players
- Evansville Evas players
- Evansville Pocketeers players
- Evansville River Rats players
- Evansville Strikers players
- Evansville Yankees players
- Evansville Brewers players
- Evansville Black Birds players
- Evansville Red players
