= Davey Claire =

American baseball player (1897–1956)

- Shortstop
- Born: December 7, 1897; Ludington, Michigan
- Died: January 7, 1956 (aged 58); Las Vegas, Nevada
- Batted: Right Threw: Right

MLB debut
- September 17, 1920, for the Detroit Tigers

Last MLB appearance
- September 19, 1920, for the Detroit Tigers

MLB statistics
- Games played: 3
- At bats: 7
- Hits: 1
- Stats at Baseball Reference

Teams
- Detroit Tigers (1920)

David Matthew Claire (November 17, 1897 – January 7, 1956) was an American Major League Baseball shortstop who played in three games for the Detroit Tigers in 1920.
