= Evansville River Rats =

Minor league baseball team in Indiana (1901–1915)

River Rats
- 1901–1915; Evansville, Indiana

Minor league affiliations
- Previous classes: B League (1914–1915); B League (1903–1910); B League (1901–1902)
- League: Central League (1914–1915)
- Previous leagues: Central League (1903–1910); Three-I League (1901–1902)

Minor league titles
- League titles: 1915 (Central League), 1908 (Central League)

Team data
- Previous parks: Bosse Field (1914–1915)

The Evansville River Rats were a professional minor league baseball team based in Evansville, Indiana. They played from 1901 to 1902 in the Illinois–Indiana–Iowa League (the "Three-I" League) and from 1903 to 1910 and 1914 to 1915 in the Central League. They played home games at Bosse Field, which is currently the third oldest baseball stadium in regular use in the United States.

== Championships ==
- 1908 – Central League Champions
- 1915 – Central League Champions
