= Fort Wayne Chiefs =

- 1917–1935; (1917, 1928–1930, 1932, 1934–1935); Fort Wayne, Indiana

Minor league affiliations
- Class: Class B (1917, 1928–1930, 1932, 1934–1935)
- League: Central League (1917, 1928–1930, 1932, 1934); Illinois-Indiana-Iowa League (1935)

Major league affiliations
- Team: St. Louis Cardinals (1928)*; Cleveland Indians (1932)

Minor league titles
- League titles (2): 1928; 1934
- Conference titles (2): 1928; 1932

Team data
- Name: Fort Wayne Chiefs (1917, 1928–1930, 1932, 1934–1935)
- Ballpark: League Park (1917, 1928–1930, 1932, 1934–1935)

The Fort Wayne Chiefs were a minor league baseball team based in Fort Wayne, Indiana.

Between 1917 and 1934, Fort Wayne Chiefs teams played seven total seasons as members of the Class B level Central League, winning the 1928 and 1934 league championships. The Chiefs played a final season as members of the 1935 Illinois-Indiana-Iowa League, as leagues and teams in the era were greatly affected by the Great Depression. The Chiefs were immediately preceded by the 1915 Fort Wayne Cubs in Fort Wayne's tenure of Central League play.

In 1932 the Fort Wayne Chiefs were a minor league affiliate of the Cleveland Indians.

Baseball Hall of Fame member Chuck Klein played for the 1928 Fort Wayne Chiefs.

Two Chiefs players had Triple Crown seasons while playing for Fort Wayne.

The Fort Wayne Chiefs teams hosted home minor league baseball games at League Park, with the ballpark grandstands nicknamed as the Grand Dutchess.

== History ==
=== Central League 1917, beginnings ===
In 1871, the first professional baseball team played in Fort Wayne, as the major league level Fort Wayne Kekiongas, were members of the National Association.

Minor league baseball began in Fort Wayne when the 1883 Fort Wayne Hoosiers began play as members of the Independent level Northwestern League. Numerous Fort Wayne minor league teams followed from 1883 in various leagues, until the 1903 Fort Wayne Railroaders began play in the Central League. The Railroaders began a tenure of Fort Wayne teams in that league. The 1915 Fort Wayne Cubs placed sixth in the 1915 Central League and immediately preceded the Chiefs in Central League play.

The Central League continued play as a Class B league in 1916, as the Fort Wayne Cubs franchise was replaced by the Muskegon Reds in Central League play for that season. In 1917, the Fort Wayne "Chiefs" rejoined the eight-team Class B level Central League for one season, before the league folded. The Fort Wayne Chiefs would later resume play as a member of the Central League in the 1928 to 1930, 1932 and 1934 seasons.

The Dayton Veterans, Evansville Evas, Grand Rapids Black Sox, Muskegon Reds, Richmond Quakers, South Bend Benders and Springfield Reapers teams joined with Fort Wayne in beginning Central League play on May 3, 1917.

Fort Wayne Chiefs finished in last place in the 1917 Central League final standings. With a regular season record of 47–73, Fort Wayne ended the season in 8th place. Playing under manager Carl Vandagrift, the Chiefs finished 31.0 gamed behind the first place Grand Rapids Black Sox. Fort Wayne did not qualify for the playoff, where the league champion Grand Rapids defeated the Peoria Distillers, (South Bend relocated to become Peoria). The Central League folded following the 1917 season due to World War I, reforming in 1920 and playing thorough 1926 without Fort Wayne as a member.

=== Central League 1928 to 1934, 2 championships ===
Without a minor league team in 1927, Fort Wayne played host to the New York Yankees on May 6, 1927. The Yankees, with Babe Ruth, played an exhibition game against a "Lincoln Lifers" local semiprofessional team, with 3,000 fans in attendance. Ruth reportedly hit a 10th–inning home run to give the Yankees a 5–3 win in the contest, played at League Park.

The Central League reformed in 1928 as a six team, Class B level league with Fort Wayne as a member franchise, leading to ownership and affiliation controversy. The League began play on April 25, 1928, with the Akron Tyrites, Canton Terriers, Dayton Aviators, Erie Sailors and Springfield Buckeyes teams joining Fort Wayne in the reformed league.

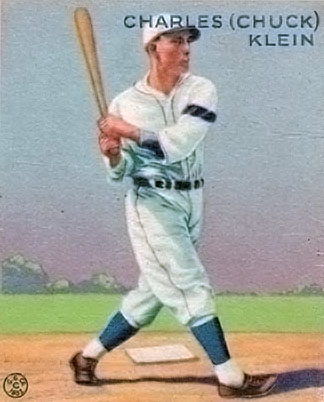
(1933) Chuck Klein, baseball card. Baseball Hall of Fame member played for the Chiefs in 1928, before making his major league debut that season.

In 1928, the Baseball Commissioner became aware of a situation that resulted from the increased scouting of the league. Commissioner Kenesaw Mountain Landis discovered that the St. Louis Cardinals owned both the Central League Dayton, Ohio, based Dayton Aviators and the Fort Wayne Chiefs, giving the Cardinals control of two teams in the same league. Due to conflict-of-interest protocols that were violated, Landis ordered the Cardinals to immediately sell the Fort Wayne franchise and forfeit the rights to the players on the Fort Wayne roster.

Baseball Hall of Fame member Chuck Klein played for Fort Wayne in 1928 at age 23. Before the 1928 season, Klein was acquired by the Chiefs from the Evansville Hubs for $200. In 88 games with Fort Wayne in 1928, Klein had a .331 average with 26 home runs, 29 doubles, and 85 runs scored. After the commissioners ruling on the conflict regarding the dual St. Louis Cardinal affiliation with Dayton and Fort Wayne, Klein became available to other teams. The Philadelphia Phillies purchased Klein's contract from Fort Wayne for $7,500, outbidding the New York Yankees, who offered Fort Wayne $5,000 for Klein. Klein then reported to Philadelphia and made his major league debut that day, July 30, 1928.

Klein later gave appreciation to Punch Knoll, his manager at Fort Wayne. "He was the one who polished my rough edges as a batter, "Klein reflected, "and believe me, as a batter, I was full of them."

At age 30, Syl Simon hit .360 with 19 home runs for Fort Wayne in 1928. In 1926, Simon lost three fingers off of his left hand in a factory accident, but continued to play in professional baseball as a third basemen. Simon played with a special bat and glove, with the glove containing part of a football knee protector to give it added strength and his bat having a metal extension. In 1962, his widow Thelma Simon donated the bat and glove to the Baseball Hall of Fame with her handwritten instructions: "Tell youngsters there is no sport with the possibilities of baseball – it truly is our national pastime. Every boy, rich or poor, has a chance to make something of himself," Thelma Simon wrote. "There are no barriers of race religion or education. If [the glove and bat] can put heart or courage in someone, it will have done double duty." Today, the glove and bat remain on display at the Baseball Hall of Fame.

In their return to minor league play in the Central League, the 1928 Fort Wayne Chiefs survived the dual affiliation roster ruling to win the Central League championship, Managed by Punch Knoll, the Chiefs ended the regular season with an overall record of 72–62. In the final standings, Fort Wayne placed third, finishing 3.5 games behind the first place Erie Sailors and 2.5 games behind second place Dayton. The league played a split-season schedule and the Chiefs qualified for the final by winning the pennant in the first half standings. In the final, the Chiefs won the league championship, by defeating Erie 4 games to 2. Erie had won the second half pennant. Fort Wayne had season home attendance of 49,578 in 1928.

Continuing play in the 1929 Class B level Central League, the Chiefs placed fourth in the six-team league. With a record of 68–70 managed by Everett Booe, Fort Wayne ended the season 12.0 games behind the first place Canton Terriers. No playoffs were held. John Reider of Fort Wayne had 134 RBI to lead the league and also had 185 total hits, best in the league.

The Chiefs had Triple Crown winner in the 1930 Central League season with the team finishing in third place. The Chiefs ended the season 11.0 games behind the first place Springfield Blue Sox who won both half seasons of the split season league. Fort Wayne had a final record of 72–67, playing the season under returning manager Punch Knoll. No playoffs were held after Springfield won both portions of the split season.

Pat Wright had a Triple Crown season for Fort Wayne in 1930. Wright finished the season with a batting average of .419, with 52 home runs and 169 RBI to lead the Central League in all three categories for the Triple Crown. Wright also had 228 total hits and scored 162 runs to lead the league.

In the midst of the Great Depression, which lasted through 1941, the Central League did not play in 1931. In 1932, the Chiefs became a minor league affiliate of the Cleveland Indians, as Central League reformed, playing as a six-team Class B level league,. The Fort Wayne Chiefs lost in the league final after the team won the second half pennant in the league's split season schedule. Fort Wayne ended the 1932 regular season with an overall record of 77–60 and placed second under manager Bill Wambsganss. In the overall standings Fort Wayne was 6.0 games behind the first place Erie Sailors. The Central League ended the season with four teams after Canton and South Bend folded. Fort Wayne lost in final to the Dayton Ducks 4 games to 0. Dayton won the first half of the split season schedule. Following the 1932 season, the Central league did not return to play in 1933.

Fort Wayne manager Bill Wambaganss later managed the Fort Wayne Daisies of the All-American Girls Professional Baseball League in 1945 and 1946. He also was noted for turning an unassisted Triple Play in the 1920 World Series.

In 1934, the Central League reformed again, and the Chiefs won a championship in an abbreviated season. On June 10, 1934, the six team Class B level Central League folded. Managed by Bill Burwell, Fort Wayne was in first place on the day the league folded, winning the league championship. Fort Wayne finished with a 19–4 record, ending the season 6.5 games ahead of the second place Springfield Red Birds, followed by the Grand Rapids Tigers and Peoria Tractors teams. The Lima Buckeyes and Muskegon Reds franchises had folded leaving the league with four remaining teams. The Central League next reformed in 1948. The Chiefs' Ralph Rhein hit 6 home runs to lead the Central League.

=== Three I league 1935 ===
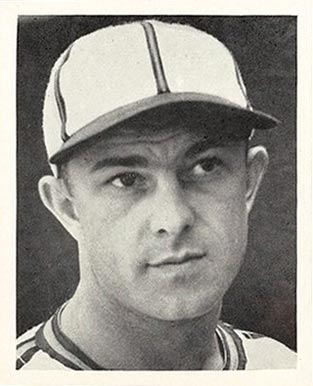
(1941) Chet Laabs. St. Louis Browns. Laabs won the Three-I League Triple Crown playing for the 1935 Fort Wayne Chiefs.

The Fort Wayne Chiefs continued play in a new league in 1935, in what was their final season. The Illinois-Indiana-Iowa League (nicknamed as the "Three I League") reformed as a six-team Class B level league returning to play for the first time since the 1932 season. The Bloomington Bloomers, Decatur Commodores, Peoria Tractors, Springfield Senators and Terre Haute Tots teams joined Fort Wayne Chiefs in beginning league play on May 5, 1935.

The Chiefs finished in fifth place in the league standings. Fort Wayne finished their final Chiefs' season with a 52–71 record, while playing the season under manager Bruno Betzel. Fort Wayne finished 25.0 games behind the pennant winning Bloomington Bloomers. Fort Wayne did not qualify for the playoff won by Springfield, Bloomington's whose series victory over Springfield was reversed after a ruling by the league president L.J. Wylie.

Chiefs player Chet Laabs won the league Triple Crown, winning the league batting championship, with a .384 average, a league leading with 24 home runs and 96 RBI. Laabs was limited to 87 games at Fort Wayne, due to injury. Laabs had a .699 slugging percentage and 56 extra-base hits. Laabs was leading all of the minor leagues with a .427 average after 54 games before missing a month due to an ankle injury. Laabs broke his ankle sliding into third base, but returned to play in 23 more games for the Chiefs. Laabs became a major league all-star in his career.

The Chiefs did not return to play in the 1936 Three-I League, as the Fort Wayne franchise was replaced by the Moline Plowboys in the six-team league.

Fort Wayne was without minor league baseball until 1948, when the Central League reformed with a Fort Wayne franchise. The Fort Wayne Generals played the season as members of the reformed Class B level league.

Today, Fort Wayne hosts the Fort Wayne TinCaps, who play as a member of the Class A level Midwest League. The franchise began Midwest League play in 1993.

== The ballpark ==
The Fort Wayne Chiefs teams hosted minor league home games at "The Grand Dutchess." The Grand Dutchess was the nickname given to the grandstands at the League Park site in 1871, so named because of their extravagant construction for the era. The site first hosted baseball beginning in 1862. The ballpark site was also known as Calhoun Street Park, Hamilton Park and Headwaters Park. The site was bordered by Lewis Street, South Calhoun Street, South Clinton Streets and Douglas Avenue in Fort Wayne.

The original park grandstands were dismantled after the 1884 Northwestern League season ended, rebuilt in 1890 and remained in use for the 1891 and 1892 minor league seasons. In 1893, the grandstand and fence were moved to Lakeside Park. The new location was referred to as both Lakeside Park and League Park until 1898. In 1899, the ballpark grandstand was then moved to the original Calhoun Street location, where the League Park Grandstand was again rebuilt.

In 1902, League Park hosted two games by the Cleveland Bronchos on Sundays to avoid Blue laws in Cleveland. The games were held on June 22, 1902, against the Washington Senators and August 31. 1902. Cy Young pitched for the Boston Americans in the August contest.

In the era, the Fort Wayne minor league teams shared league Park with the Fort Wayne Colored Giants of the Negro Leagues, who began play in 1907.

On May 6, 1927, League Park hosted the New York Yankees in an exhibition game while the team was traveling to Chicago. The Yankees, with Babe Ruth, played an exhibition game against the "Lincoln Lifers" semiprofessional team, with a crowd of 3,000 in attendance. Ruth reportedly home run to give the Yankees a win in the contest.

There is a historical marker placed at the League Park site. Today, the League Park site between South Clinton Street and South Calhoun Street is known as Headwaters Park. Still in use today as a public park, Headwaters Park is located at 333 South Calhoun Street.

== Timeline ==
Year(s)	# Yrs.	Team	Level	League	Affiliate	Ballpark
1917	1	Fort Wayne Chiefs	Class B	Central League	None	League Park
1928–1930	3	Fort Wayne Chiefs	Class B	Central League	None	League Park
1932	1	Fort Wayne Chiefs	Class B	Central League	Cleveland Indians	League Park
1934	1	Fort Wayne Chiefs	Class B	Central League	None	League Park
1935	1	Fort Wayne Chiefs	Class B	Illinois-Indiana-Iowa League	None	League Park

== Year-by-year records ==
Year	Record	Finish	Manager	Playoffs / Notes
1917	47–73	8th	Carl Vandagrift	Did not qualify
1928	72–62	3rd	Punch Knoll	Won first half pennant Won league championship Defeated Erie in final
1929	68–70	4th	Everett Booe	No playoffs held
1930	72–67	3rd	Punch Knoll	No playoffs held
1932	77–60	2nd	Bill Wambsganss	Won second half pennant Lost in final
1934	19–4	1st	Bill Burwell	Won league championship League folded June 10
1935	52–71	5th	Bruno Betzel	Did not qualify

== Notable alumni ==
- Chuck Klein (1928) Inducted Baseball Hall of Fame, 1980
- Mack Allison (1917)
- Everett Booe (1929, MGR)
- Bruno Betzel (1935, MGR)
- Herb Bradley (1932, 1935)
- Bill Burwell (1934, MGR)
- Ed Clough (1929, 1932)
- Dutch Distel (1929)
- Denny Galehouse (1932)
- Norm Glockson (1917)
- Ed Heusser (1929)
- Tex Hoffman (1917)
- Kenny Hogan (1932)
- Bob Kahle (1934)
- Punch Knoll (1928, 1930 MGR)
- Chet Laabs (1935)
- Harvey MacDonald (1928)
- Ted Menze (1928, 1932)
- Ralph Miller (1917, 1932)
- Billy Myers (1929)
- Otho Nitcholas (1930)
- Gil Paulsen (1930)
- Ray Pepper (1929)
- George Puccinelli (1929)
- Jack Richardson (1917)
- Frank Rooney (1917)
- Mike Ryba (1929)
- Rusty Saunders (1932)
- Tripp Sigman (1932)
- Syl Simon (1930)
- Elmer Smith (1932)
- Hal Smith (1929–1930)
- Harry Smith (1917)
- Frank Stewart (1932)
- Yank Terry (1934)
- Carl Vandagrift (1917, MGR)
- Bill Wambsganss (1932, MGR)
- Cy Warmoth (1917)
- Bill Whaley (1928)
- Del Young (1932)

== See also ==
Fort Wayne Chiefs players
Sports in Fort Wayne, Indiana
List of professional baseball teams based in Fort Wayne, Indiana
