= Terre Haute Terre-iers =

- 1912–1914; (1910–1916); Terre Haute, Indiana

Minor league affiliations
- Class: Class B (1910–1916)
- League: Central League (1910–1916)

Major league affiliations
- Team: None

Minor league titles
- League titles (0): None

Team data
- Name: Terre Haute Stags (1910); Terre Haute Miners (1911); Terre Haute Terre-iers (1912–1914); Terre Haute Highlanders (1915–1916)
- Ballpark: Athletic Park (1910–1916)

The Terre Haute Terre-iers were a minor league baseball team based in Terre Haute, Indiana.

From 1910 to 1916, Terre Haute teams exclusively played as members of the Class B level Central League, following the 1900 through 1909 Terre Haute Hottentots, who began the tenure as members of the Central League. Following the Hottentots, Terre Haute played under four nicknames and had one winning Central League season, in 1915. The Terre Haute teams played in the Central League as the "Stags" in 1910, the "Miners' in 1911, the "Terre-iers" from 1912 to 1914 and the "Highlanders" in 1915 and 1916.

The Terre Haute "Terre-iers" nickname was a deliberate misspelling of "Terriers."

For their duration in the league, Terre Haute teams hosted Central League home minor league games at Athletic Park, the site of today's Indiana State University owned Memorial Stadium.

== History ==
=== Central League 1910 & 1911 ===
Terre Haute first hosted baseball play as early as 1870. One of the early Terre Haute baseball teams in 1883 was nicknamed the "Awkwards."

Minor league baseball began in Terre Haute in 1884, when the "Terre Haute" team played the season as members of the Independent level Northwestern League under managers Al Buckenberger and George Hammerstein, finishing with a 17–44 record.

After beginning play in the 1891 Northwestern League, the Terre Haute Hottentots immediately preceded the Terre Haute "Stags" team in Central League play. The Terre Haute Hottentots played as members of the Central League in 1897, 1900 and from 1903 to 1909. The Hottentots played minor league home games at Athletic Park, which continued hosting home games for the Central League Terre Haute teams.

In 1910 the Terre Haute Hottentots received a new nickname, as the "Stags" continued Terre Haute's membership in the Class B level Central League. The Dayton Veterans Evansville River Rats, Fort Wayne Billikens, Grand Rapids Raiders, South Bend Bronchos, Wheeling Stogies and Zanesville Potters teams joined the Stags in beginning Central League play on April 20, 1910.

The 1910 Terre Haute Stags placed fifth in the final standings of the eight-team Central League. The Stags finished with a regular season record 42–36, playing the season under manager Cuppy Groeschow, who had managed the Hottentots in 1909. Terre Haute finished 24.5 games behind the first place South Bend Bronchos in the final league standings of the eight-team league, which held no playoffs in the era. Arista DeHaven of Terre Haute had 173 total hits to lead the Central League.

The Terre Haute team was known at the "Miners" in the 1911 season, as the team finished last in the eight-team Central League. The Miners ended the finished with a record of 45–91, placing eighth in the Central League, playing the season under managers Ed Wheeler, Angus Grant and Jock Somerlott. Terre Haute finished. 40.5 games behind the first place Dayton Veterans in the final standings. Joe Connolly, who was traded from Zanesville/ to Terre Haute during the season, won the Central League batting title, hitting .355.

=== Central League - Terre Haute Terre-iers 1912 to 1914 ===
The Class B Central League expanded by four teams in 1912, as Terre Haute continued league play, becoming known by the "Terre-iers" nickname. The Akron Rubbermen, Canton Statesmen, Erie Sailors and Youngstown Steelmen teams joined the league increasing it to twelve teams.

The Terre Haute "Terre-iers" nickname was a deliberate misspelling of "Terriers" to match the "Terre" in "Terre Haute."

On June 10, 1912, a rarity occurred in a Terre Haute game against Akron. Akron player Jack McCallister batted five times against Terre Haute with no official at-bats. McCallister had five consecutive sacrifice bunts in the game.

On the field, the Terre-iers placed tenth in the 12–team Central League, after the league had expanded. Terre Haute ended the season with a record of 59–79, finishing 18.0 games behind the first place Fort Wayne Railroaders. The 12–team league held no playoffs.

The Terre Haute Terre-iers continued play in the 1913 Central League, as the Central League reduced from twelve teams to six teams and remained a Class B level league.

After a 7–6 loss in a 1913 game against Fort Wayne, Terre Haute player/manager Goat Anderson protested the game. During the game, a loose Great Dane named "Don" ran at Anderson as he chased after a base hit in left field. "Don" running and jumping at Anderson caused him to hesitate and the batter ended up with a triple on the play. Anderson filed a protest that the entire game be played over. Central League president Louis Heilbroner denied Anderson's protest, reasoning that the play was not a significant impact on the outcome of the game. Heilbroner ordered that Don no longer be allowed on the field during games.

Placing fifth in the final standings of the six-team Central League, the Terre-iers had an overall record of 60–79, playing the season under manager Ed "Goat" Anderson. Terre Haute finished 31.5 games behind the first place Grand Rapids Bill-eds (92–48) in the final standings. The Central League held no playoffs in 1913.

The Terre Haute Terre-iers 1914 placed fourth as the Class B Central League played the season with six teams. Larry Quinlan managed Terre Haute to a 61–71 record. After the Springfield Reapers team folded on August 8, the Central League continued play to the end of the season with five teams, concluding the season September 7, 1914. The Terre-iers ended the season 23.5 games behind the first place Dayton Veterans, with no league playoffs held. Jack Sheehan of Terre Haute won the Central League batting title with a .340 average and also led the league with 179 total hits.

=== Central League - Terre Haute Highlanders 1915 & 1916 ===
The Terre Haute became known as the "Highlanders" in 1915. On July 24, 1915, Terre Haute pitcher Art Nehf threw a no-hitter in a 1–0 victory over Erie. Nehf struck out 9 hitters and walked one in the victory. Neff would have a strong season with Terre Haute, before leaving the team for the major leagues in August.

On May 22, 1915, Terre Haute played at Youngstown after their game at Erie on May 21 was rained out. Evansville was in first place in the Central League standings with a 17–10 record and Terre Haute was tied with Fort Wayne in fourth place with a 14–14 record on that date. "Jack" Vann was hitting .356 and "Bunny" Thomas .353 for Terre Haute on that date, good for second and third in the Central League. Terre Haute was second to Fort Wayne with a team batting average of .278.

The Highlanders finished above .500 as the 1915 Central League continued play, expanding to an eight-team league from a six-team league. With a 66–58 record, Terre Haute placed fourth, playing the season under manager Rufus Gilbert. Terre Haute finished 7.0 games behind of the first place Evansville River Rats in the eight–team league final standings.

Pitcher Art Nehf of Terre Haute led the Central League with both 218 strikeouts and a 1.38 ERA. In 1915, having graduated with a degree in electrical engineering from Rose Polytechnic Institute in Terre Haute, Neff also threw a no-hitter for Terre Haute and had a Central League 17 strikeouts in another game. The Boston Braves sent Fred Mitchell to scout Neff. On August 4, 1914, the Braves purchased Neff's contract from Terre Haute for $3,500. and Neff made his debut with the defending world series champion Braveson August 13, 1915.

Terre Haute Highlanders played their final season as members of the Class B level Central League in 1916. The 1916 Terre Haute Highlanders placed sixth in the eight–team Central League. With a record of 62–71, Terre Haute finished 25.5 games behind the champion Grand Rapids Black Sox. The 1916 Highlanders' manager was the returning Rufus Gilbert. Terre Haute did not qualify for the playoff won by the Dayton Veterans over the Springfield Reapers. Terre Haute folded following the 1916 Central League season.

The Central League continued play in 1917, as the Terre Haute franchise was replaced by the Richmond Quakers team in the eight-team league. After not hosting a minor league team in 1917 and 1918, Terre Haute resumed play when the 1919 Terre Haute Browns began a long tenure for the franchise as members of the Three-I League, with Baseball Hall of Fame member and local native Mordecai Brown managing the 1919 Browns in their first season of play in the new league. Terre Haute teams played in the league through 1956.

Today, Terre Haute hosts the Terre Haute Rex, who play amateur collegiate summer baseball as a member of the Prospect League. The Rex were formed in 2013. The Rex host home games at Bob Warn Field at Sycamore Stadium, home to the of Indiana State Sycamores baseball team. The stadium opened in 1978 as "Sycamore Stadium.

== The ballpark ==
The Terre Haute teams hosted Central League minor league home games at Athletic Park. The ballpark hosted all Terre Haute minor league teams through 1925. The original ballpark was torn down in 1926. The ballpark was called "Highland Park" while hosting the Terre Haute Highlanders.

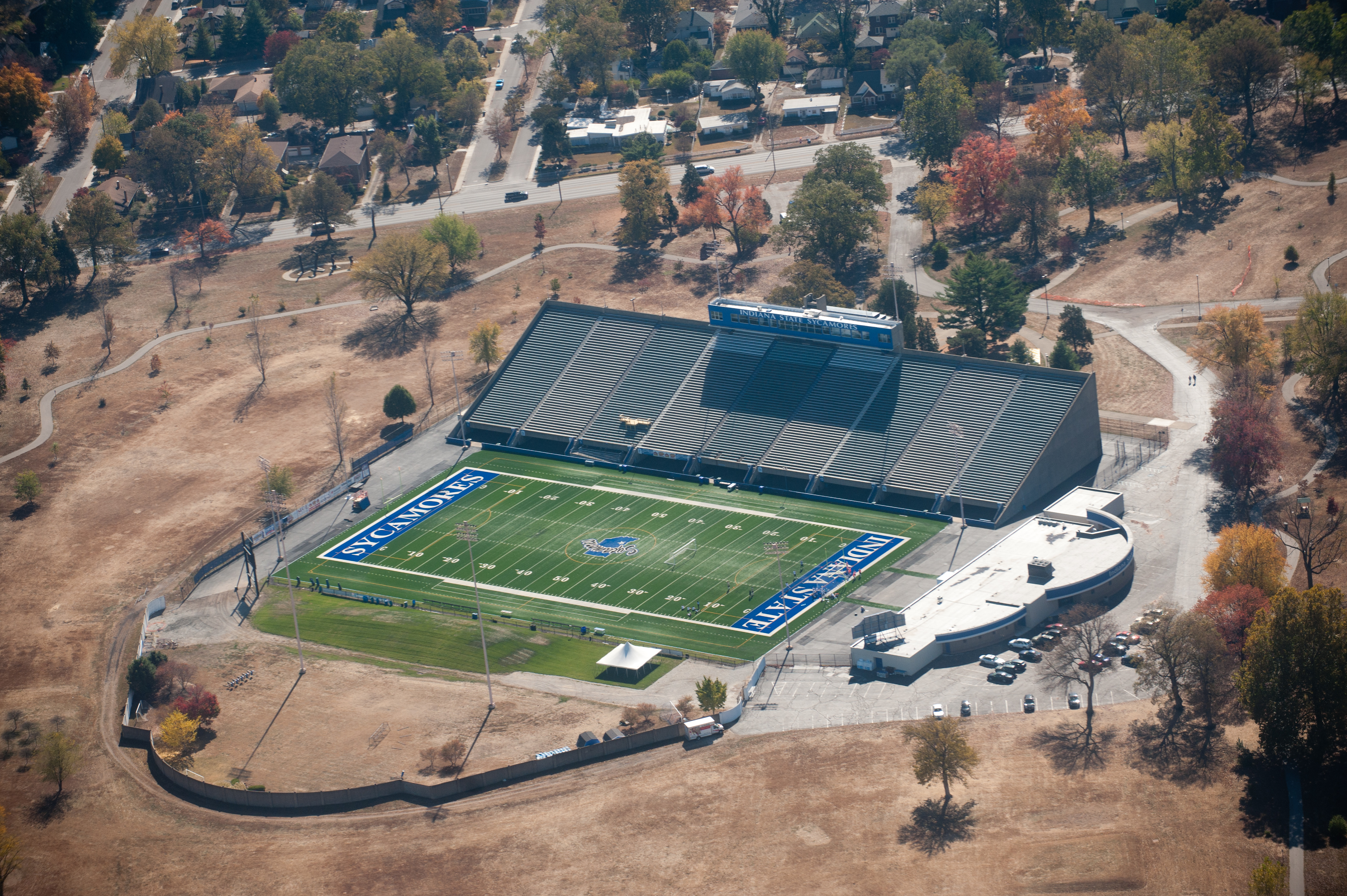
(2010) Indiana State University Memorial Stadium. The former outfield walls for baseball are still in place opposite the grandstands.

The Athletic Field site began as a fairground and hosted the 1867 Indiana State Fair. The site first had a ballpark in 1883 and that original ballpark was rebuilt in 1885. In 1925, the ballpark was torn down as the site was repurposed, remaining an athletic venue, where it continues to host athletics today containing the Indiana State University Memorial Stadium.

On October 20, 1908, Athletic Park hosted an exhibition game between the World Series Champion Chicago Cubs and the Detroit Tigers. The Cubs had won the world series just six days earlier. The Cubs and defeated the Tigers in the exhibition game by the score of 7–1. The game was arranged by Cubs pitcher Mordecai Brown a native of the area. The game featured Baseball Hall of Fame members Brown, Ty Cobb, Frank Chance, Joe Tinker, and Johnny Evers.

On May 5, 1925, after the site renovations that began in 1922, the newly built Memorial Stadium was dedicated to the public. The ceremonies occurred before the Three-I League game between Terre Haute Tots and Peoria Tractors. Major League Baseball Commissioner Judge Kenesaw Mountain Landis was a participant in the ceremonies.

In 1967, Indiana State University purchased the site and facilities and began playing football games at Memorial Stadium. The stadium has since undergone numerous upgrades and evolved into a football and soccer facility. Today, Memorial Stadium is located at 3300 Wabash Avenue in Terre Haute, Indiana.

== Timeline ==
Year(s)	# Yrs.	Team	Level	League	Ballpark
1900, 1903–1909	1	Terre Haute Hottentots	Class B	Central League	Athletic Park
1910	1	Terre Haute Stags	Class B	Central League	Athletic Park
1911	1	Terre Haute Miners	Class B	Central League	Athletic Park
1912–1914	3	Terre Haute Terre-iers	Class B	Central League	Athletic Park
1915–1916	2	Terre Haute Highlanders	Class B	Central League	Athletic Park

== Year-by-year records ==
Year	Record	Finish	Manager	Playoffs / Notes
1910	63–74	5th	Cuppy Groeschow	No playoffs held
1911	45–91	8th	Ed Wheeler / Angus Grant; Jock Somerlott	No playoffs held
1912	59–70	10th	Angus Grant / John Nee	No playoffs held (12-team league)
1913	60–79	5th	Goat Anderson	No playoffs held
1914	61–71	4th	Larry Quinlan	No playoffs held
1915	66–58	4th	Rufus Gilbert	No playoffs held
1916	62–71	6th	Rufus Gilbert	Did not qualify

== Notable alumni ==
- Cy Alberts (1910–1913)
- Goat Anderson (1913, MGR)
- Harry Arndt (1913)
- Harry Billiard (1911)
- Jim Callahan (1911)
- Tom Cantwell (1912–1914)
- Joe Connolly (1911)
- Bill Cramer (1916)
- Cal Crum (1916)
- Biddy Dolan (1912–1914)
- Tom Drohan (1914)
- Joe Evers (1913–1916)
- Rufus Gilbert (1913; 1915–1916, MGR)
- Oscar Graham (1914)
- Bubbles Hargrave (1911–1913)
- Bruce Hartford (1911–1912)
- Eddie Higgins (1910)
- Nick Kahl (1911)
- Andy Kyle (1914)
- Harry LaRoss (1916)
- Len Madden (1913–1915)
- Danny Mahoney (1911–1912)
- Joe Mathes (1916)
- Johnny Mitchell (1916)
- Art Nehf (1912–1915)
- Jay Parker (1913)
- Charlie Pick (1912–1913)
- Ollie Pickering (1912)
- Charlie Pickett (1910)
- Lou Schettler (1916)
- Johnny Schulte (1916)
- Ralph Shafer (1916)
- Jack Sheehan (1914)
- Fred Smith (1911)
- Jock Somerlott (1910–1911)
- Rudy Sommers (1910)
- Vern Spencer (1916)
- John Vann (1915)
- Bill Wagner (1916)
- Ed Wheeler (1911, MGR)
- George Wheeler (1910, 1912–1913)

== See also ==
- Terre Haute Terre-iers players
- Terre Haute Highlanders players
- Terre Haute Miners players
- Terre Haute Stags players
