= Springfield Buckeyes =

- 1928; (1928–1930); Springfield, Ohio

Minor league affiliations
- Class: Class B (1928–1930)
- League: Central League (1928–1930)

Major league affiliations
- Team: None

Minor league titles
- League titles (1): 1930

Team data
- Name: Springfield Buckeyes (1928); Springfield Dunnmen (1928); Springfield Blue Sox (1928)
- Ballpark: Eagles Field (1928–1930)

The Springfield Buckeyes were a minor league baseball team based in Springfield, Ohio.

From 1928 to 1930, Springfield played as members of the Class B level Central League. Springfield won the 1930 Central League championship playing under Springfield native Joe Dunn, who managed the team all three seasons in the league. Springfield had a different nickname in each of the three seasons of Central League play, with the 1929 team being known as the "Dunnmen" in reference to their manager.

The Springfield teams hosted home Central League games at Eagles Field, located in Springfield.

== History ==
In 1877, minor league play began in Springfield, when the "Springfield Champion City" team played as members of the League Alliance. The 1917 Springfield Reapers preceded the Buckeyes in Central League play, ending a tenure in the league, which folded following the 1917 season. Joe Dunn managed the Reapers in 1916 and 1917.

Former Springfield Reapers manager Joe Dunn was the key figure in bringing minor league baseball back to Springfield in 1928. Without a Springfield-based team since Dunn led the 1917 Springfield Reapers, Dunn and his siblings Charles and Katherine partnered together to form the "Springfield Baseball Club Inc." They hoped to secure a franchise as the Central League was reforming for the 1928 season. The three siblings transferred some of the franchise stock to Frank Navin, who was the owner of the Detroit Tigers. Dunn had previously worked for Navin while serving as a scout for the Tigers in 1922. The club received $5,000 from Navin for the stock in the team, which was used for operating expenses. In return Navin received a percentage of the ballpark concessions and held first-refusal rights on any players that the team signed. The franchise secured rent at Eagles Field in Springfield for $3,000 for the season and sold the concessions rights to the Jacobs Brothers of Buffalo, New York for $3,000. The Springfield team was then established.

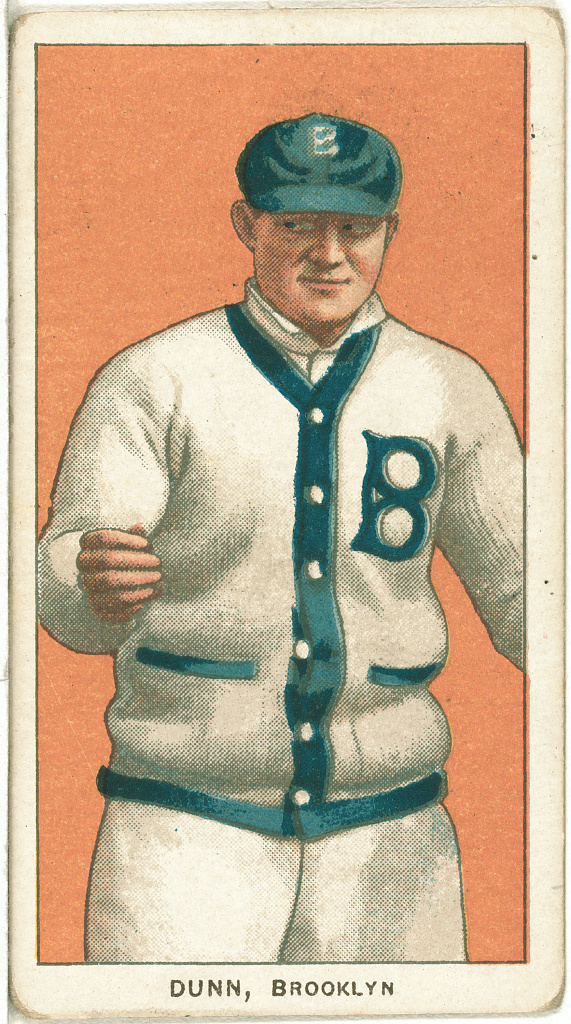
(1909) Joe Dunn, Brooklyn Superbas, baseball card portrait. Dunn formed the Springfield team with his siblings and managed the ballclub.

After the franchise was secured, the Springfield "Buckeyes" resumed minor league play in 1928, when the Central League reformed. The Buckeyes became members of the six-team, Class B level Central League. The Akron Tyrites, Canton Terriers, Dayton Aviators, Erie Sailors and Fort Wayne Chiefs teams joined Springfield in beginning Central League play on April 25, 1928. The Buckeyes were managed by Springfield native Joseph Dunn, who would serve as manager for three seasons. The Buckeyes began hosting home minor league games at Eagles Field.

The Springfield use of the "Buckeyes" nickname corresponds with Ohio history. The state is nicknamed as "The Buckeye State," with residents of the state referred to as "buckeyes" as early as the 1840s. The buckeye tree (Aesculus glabra) is indigenous to the region and is the state tree of Ohio.

In their first season of play, the Buckeyes placed fifth in the Central League overall standings, with the league playing a split season schedule. With a record of 67–66, Springfield finished 10.0 games behind the first place Erie Sailors (76–57) in the final regular season standings. The Buckeyes did not qualify for the league playoff, as Erie won the second half of the split-season schedule, and the Fort Wayne Chiefs won the first half standings, with Fort Wayne winning the playoff championship over Erie.

The Springfield was renamed to the "Dunnmen" in 1929, corresponding to their manager. Springfield continued play in the 1929 Central League, again placing fifth in the final standings of the six-team league. The Dunnmen had an overall record of 59-77 and finished 20.0 games behind the first place Canton Terries in the final standings. The league held no playoffs, as Springifled was managed by their namesake Joseph Dunn during the season.

The Springfield "Blue Sox" won the 1930 Central League championship. Playing their final season under returning manager Joseph Dunn, the Blue Sox placed first in the six-team league, and no playoffs were held. With a record of 82–55, Springfield finished 7.0 games ahead of the second place Erie Sailors in the six-team league. Gus Goeckel of Springfield led Central League pitchers with both a 3.19 ERA and a 19–5 record.

The Central League folded and did not return to play in 1931, leaving Springfield unable to defend their championship. With his franchise without a league, Springfield was unable to continue minor league play. As owner of the team, during the Great Depression, Joe Dunn incurred debt and was advised to declare bankruptcy to avoid the debts. He declined and was able to repay his creditors over time. Joseph Dunn left Springfield to become manager of the Bloomington Cubs in 1931, his last season of managing in the minor leagues.

In 1931 and 1932, after the Central League folded, Springfield did not host a minor league team. In 1933, the Springfield Chicks began play as members of the Class C level Middle Atlantic League.

== The ballpark ==
The Springfield teams hosted minor league home games at Eagles Field from 1928 to 1930. The Springfield Buckeyes rented the ballpark for $3000 beginning with the 1928 season. In 1933, the Springfield Chicks resumed minor league play at Eagles Field. The ballpark no longer exists. Eagles Field was located on North Murray, between York Street and East Columbia Street in Springfield, Ohio.

== Timeline ==
Year(s)	# Yrs.	Team	Level	League	Ballpark
1928	1	Springfield Buckeyes	Class B	Central League	Eagles Field
1929	1	Springfield Dunnmen	Class B	Central League	Eagles Field
1930	1	Springfield Blue Sox	Class B	Central League	Eagles Field

== Year-by-year records ==
Year	Record	Finish	Manager	Playoffs / Notes
1928	67–66	5th	Joe Dunn	Did not qualify
1929	59–77	5th	Joe Dunn	No playoffs held
1930	82–55	1st	Joe Dunn	League champions No playoffs held

== Notable alumni ==
- Sumpter Clarke (1928)
- Jim Curry (1928)
- Tod Dennehey (1930)
- Joe Dunn (1928–1930, MGR)
- Rudy Kneisch (1928)
- Frank McGee (1929)
- Ollie Marquardt (1928)
- Joe O'Rourke (1928)
- Dutch Ussat (1928)
- Frank Wayenberg (1930)

== See also ==
- Springfield Buckeyes players
- Springfield Dunnmen players
- Springfield Blue Sox players
