= Recreation Park =

Recreation Park may refer to:

== Canada ==
- Recreation Park (Ontario), a classification of Ontario provincial parks
- Recreation Park (Vancouver), a former baseball park; until 1913 the home of a team owned by Bob Brown

== Scotland ==
- Recreation Park, Alloa, a football ground
- Recreation Park, Lochgelly, a former football ground
- Recreation Park, a former football ground in Peterhead, former home of Peterhead F.C.

== United States ==
Alphabetical by state, then city

=== City parks ===
- Recreation Park (El Segundo), California
- Recreation Park (Long Beach, California)
- Recreation Park (Raymore), Missouri
- Recreation Park (Binghamton), New York
- Recreation Park Complex (Chehalis, Washington)

=== Baseball parks ===
- Recreation Park (San Francisco), California, several former baseball parks
- Recreation Park (Visalia), California, now Valley Strong Ballpark
- Recreation Park (Detroit), Michigan (defunct)
- Recreation Park (Columbus), Ohio (defunct)
- Recreation Park (Philadelphia), Pennsylvania (defunct)
- Recreation Park (Pittsburgh), Pennsylvania (defunct)
- Recreation Park (Grand Rapids, Michigan), Michigan (defunct)
