= Ed Wheeler =

Ed Wheeler may refer to:

- Ed Wheeler (1900s infielder) (1878–1960), American MLB baseball player in 1902
- Ed Wheeler (1940s infielder) (1915–1983), American MLB baseball player in 1945
