= Recreation ground (disambiguation) =

A recreation ground is a type of park.

Recreation Ground is the name of the following stadiums in the United Kingdom:

- Recreation Ground (Aldershot), the home ground of Aldershot Town F.C., located in Aldershot, England
- Recreation Ground, Banstead, a cricket ground in Banstead, Surrey, England
- Recreation Ground, Bath, the home ground of Bath Rugby, located in Bath, England
- Recreation Ground (Caersws), a multi-use stadium in Caersws, Wales
- Recreation Ground (Chesterfield), the home ground of Chesterfield F.C., located in Chesterfield, England
- Recreation Ground (Holbeck), a former cricket ground in Holbeck, Leeds, England
- The Recreation Ground, Kington, a cricket ground in Kington, Herefordshire, England
- Recreation Ground, Llansantffraid-ym-Mechain, the former home ground of The New Saints, located in Llansantffraid-ym-Mechain, Wales
- Recreation Ground, Long Eaton, a former multi-use sports ground in Long Eaton, Derbyshire, England
- Recreation Ground, Torquay, a former First-class cricket ground located in Torquay, Devon, England
- Recreation Ground (Whitehaven), the home ground of Whitehaven Rugby League Football Club
- New Recreation Ground, the former home ground of Grays Athletic F.C., in Grays, Essex, England
- The Old Recreation Ground, a former football stadium in Hanley, Stoke-on-Trent, England
- Recreation Ground, Oudtshoorn, cricket ground in South Africa

== See also ==
- )
- Recreation Park (disambiguation)
