= Fans Field =

Fans Field may refer to two U.S. baseball parks. Both are located in Illinois:

- Fans Field (Bloomington)
- Fans Field (Decatur)
