= Rufus Gilbert =

American football, basketball, and baseball player and coach (1884–1962)

Biographical details
- Born: December 8, 1884; Warren, Minnesota, U.S.
- Died: May 29, 1962 (aged 77); Grand Junction, Colorado, U.S.

Playing career

Baseball
- 1908–1910: Peoria Distillers
- 1912: Springfield Reapers
- 1912: Zanesville Potters
- 1913: Denver Bears
- 1913: Terre Haute Terre-iers
- 1914: Toronto Maple Leafs
- 1914: Jersey City Skeeters
- 1915–1916: Terre Haute Highlanders
- 1917: Richmond Quakers
- 1921–1922: Portland Beavers
- Positions: First baseman, outfielder, pitcher

Coaching career (HC unless noted)

Football
- 1905: Kalamazoo
- 1907–1908: Kalamazoo
- 1909–1911: Bradley
- 1915: Rose Polytechnic
- 1917–1920: Rose Polytechnic

Basketball
- 1913–1921: Rose Polytechnic

Baseball
- 1915–1916: Terre Haute Highlanders
- c. 1920: Rose Polytechnic

Track and field
- c. 1920: Rose Polytechnic

Administrative career (AD unless noted)
- 1917–1921: Rose Polytechnic

Head coaching record
- Overall: 27–53–4 (football); 39–67 (basketball)

Rufus W. "Lefty" Gilbert (December 8, 1884 – May 29, 1962) was an American football, basketball, and baseball player and coach. He served as the head football coach at Kalamazoo College in 1905 and from 1907 to 1908), Bradley Polytechnic Institute (now known as Bradley University) from 1909 to 1911, and at Rose Polytechnic Institute (now known as Rose-Hulman Institute of Technology) in 1915 and from 1917 to 1920). Gilbert was also the head basketball coach at Rose Polytechnic from 1913 to 1921, tallying a mark of 39–67. His son, Louis, played college football at the University of Michigan from 1925 to 1927.

Gilbert played high school baseball in Kalamazoo, Michigan. He was appointed as the athletic director at Rose Polytechnic in 1917, and given charge of the football, basketball, baseball, and track teams.

Gilbert was later a geologist. He moved to Grand Junction, Colorado in 1946. He died on May 29, 1962, at St. Mary's Hospital in Grand Junction.

== Head coaching record ==
Year	Team	Overall	Conference	Standing	Bowl/playoffs
Kalamazoo (Michigan Intercollegiate Athletic Association) (1905)
1905	Kalamazoo	3–6	3–3	T–3rd	
Kalamazoo (Michigan Intercollegiate Athletic Association) (1907–1908)
1907	Kalamazoo	0–6	0–5	5th	
1908	Kalamazoo	2–7–1	0–4–1	5th	
Kalamazoo:		5–19–1	3–12–1		
Bradley Indians (Independent) (1909–1911)
1909	Bradley	1–4–2			
1910	Bradley	5–4			
1911	Bradley	1–6			
Bradley:		7–14–2			
Rose Polytechnic (Independent) (1915)
1915	Rose Polytechnic	4–4			
Rose Polytechnic (Independent) (1917–1920)
1917	Rose Polytechnic	6–4			
1918	Rose Polytechnic	0–2–1			
1919	Rose Polytechnic	3–4			
1920	Rose Polytechnic	2–6			
Kalamazoo:		15–20–1			
Total:		27–53–4			

== See also ==
- List of college football head coaches with non-consecutive tenure
