= Jimmy Jordan (baseball) =

American baseball player (1908-1957)

- Second baseman / Shortstop
- Born: January 13, 1908; Tucapau, South Carolina, U.S.
- Died: December 4, 1957 (aged 49); Charlotte, North Carolina, U.S.
- Batted: Right Threw: Right

MLB debut
- April 20, 1933, for the Brooklyn Dodgers

Last MLB appearance
- September 27, 1936, for the Brooklyn Dodgers

MLB statistics
- Batting average: .257
- Home runs: 2
- Runs batted in: 118
- Stats at Baseball Reference

Teams
- Brooklyn Dodgers (1933–1936)

James William Jordan (January 13, 1908 – December 4, 1957) was an American professional baseball player whose career in the major leagues lasted from April 20, 1933, to September 27, 1936.

A native of the South Carolina settlement of Tucapau, a part of the Startex-Tucapau census-designated place in Spartanburg County, Jordan was a 5 ft 9 in (1.75 m), right-handed batter and pitcher who began his career in the minors with the home county South Atlantic League team in 1926. He subsequently played for Topeka, Dayton, Houston, Greensboro, Rochester and Jersey City before spending four seasons with the Brooklyn Dodgers as a second baseman and shortstop. Following his stint with the Dodgers, he served as a manager of the Hutchinson Pirates and London Pirates.

Jordan died at his home in Charlotte, North Carolina, at age 49.
