= Springfield Reapers =

- 1908–1917; (1908, 1911–1914, 1916–1917); Springfield, Ohio

Minor league affiliations
- Class: Class D (1908, 1911); Class B (1912–1914, 1916–1917)
- League: Ohio State League (1908, 1911); Central League (1912–1914, 1916–1917)

Major league affiliations
- Team: None

Minor league titles
- League titles (1): 1911
- Conference titles (1): 1916

Team data
- Name: Springfield Reapers (1908, 1911–1914, 1916–1917)
- Ballpark: Snyder Field (1908, 1911–1914, 1916–1917)

The Springfield Reapers were a minor league baseball team based in Springfield, Ohio.

The Reapers played as members of the 1908 and 1911 Class D level Ohio State League, winning the league championship in 1911. The Reapers joined the Class B level Central League, playing as members from 1912 to 1914 and 1916 to 1917. The Reapers played the 1916 and 1917 seasons with Springfield native Joe Dunn serving as manager.

Baseball Hall of Fame member Jesse Haines played for the 1916 and 1917 Springfield Reapers teams.

The Springfield teams hosted home minor league games at Snyder Field, which was located within today's Snyder Park.

== History ==
=== Ohio State League 1908 & 1911 ===
Minor league baseball play began in Springfield in 1877, when the Springfield "Champion City" team played the season as members of the League Alliance. The 1907 Springfield "Babes" preceded the Reapers in minor league play, with the team ending a three season tenure in the Central League, as the Wheeling Stogies franchise replaced Springfield in the league. Springfield continued minor league play in 1909.

The Springfield use of the "Reapers" nickname corresponds to the Springfield region history and agriculture industry. The Springfield area remains a large crop production region. A "reaper" is a farm implement that revolutionized farming and evolved over time into today's combine harvester.

In 1908, Springfield played in a new league. The Springfield "Reapers" were formed and played a partial season as members of the six-team Class D level Ohio State League before the team relocated during a last place season. The Ohio State League reformed for the first time since 1898 and to begin the season, Springfield joined the Lancaster Lanks, Lima Cigarmakers, Mansfield Pioneers, Marion Diggers and Newark Newks teams in Ohio State League play, when began scheduled games on April 23, 1908.

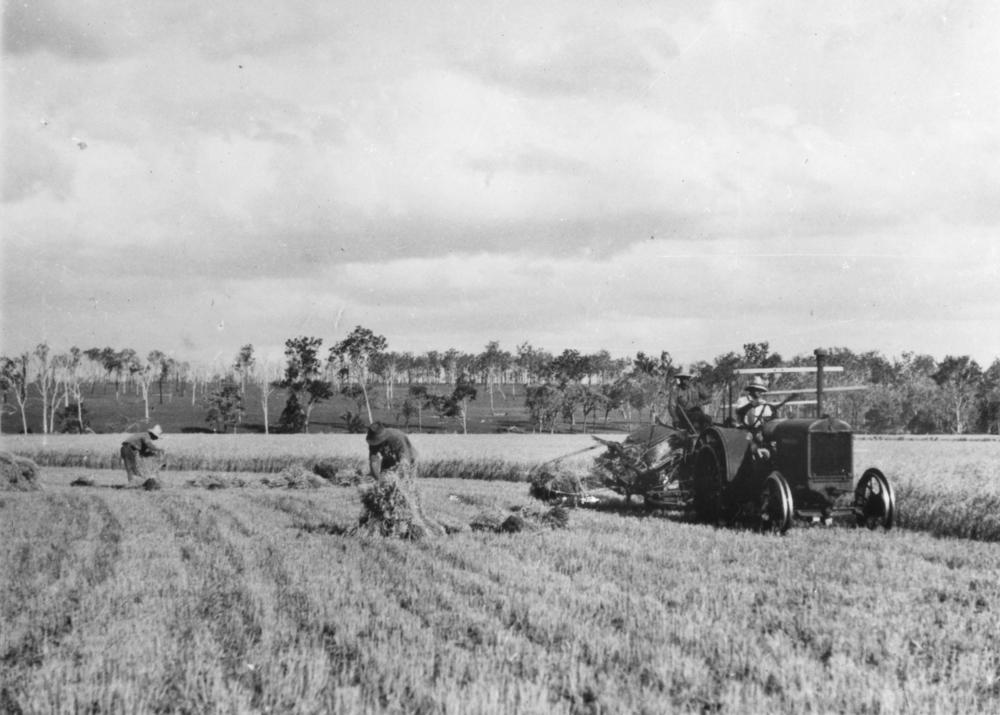
(1927) Harvesting hay using a reaper and binder.

On June 16, 1908, the Springfield Reapers franchise moved to become the Portsmouth Cobblers. Springfield had a 17–30 record at the time of the move to Portsmouth, Ohio. After compiling a 29–73 record while based in Portsmouth, the Springfield/Portsmouth team ended the season in sixth place in the Ohio State League final standings, with an overall record of 46–103. Ned Ransick and R. Quinn served as managers, as the Cobblers ended the season 46.0 games behind the first place Lancaster Lanks. The Portsmouth Cobblers continued Ohio State League play, while Springfield remained without a franchise in 1909 and 1910.

In 1911, after a two-season hiatus, the Springfield Reapers returned to play and won the league championship. Springfield resumed minor league play, rejoining the Class B level Ohio State League as the league expanded to from six teams to eight teams. The 1911 Ohio State League added Springfield and the Chillicothe Infants as expansion teams. Springfield and Chillicothe joined the returning Hamilton Mechanics, Lancaster Lanks, Lima Cigarmakers, Marion Diggers, Newark Newks and Portsmouth Cobblers teams in beginning the league schedule on April 20, 1911.

Under manager Charley O'Day, the Reapers ended the season with a record of 84–55 and captured the Ohio State League championship. In the final standings, Springfield finished 3.0 games ahead of the second place Marion Diggers and 6.0 games ahead of third place Portsmouth in the eight-team league. No playoffs were held. Pitcher Roy Ashenfelder, who split the season between the last place Hamilton Mechanics and Springfield, won 24 games to lead the Ohio State League.

Despite winning the 1911 league championship, Springfield did not return to the Ohio State and continued play in 1912 in a new league.

=== Central League 1912 to 1914 ===
In 1912, the Springfield Reapers continued minor league play, as the team switched leagues and joined a higher-level league. The Reapers became members of the Class B level Central League, as the league expanded from eight teams to twelve. The Akron Tyrites, Akron Rubbermen, Canton Statesmen, Dayton Veterans, Erie Sailors, Fort Wayne Railroaders, Grand Rapids Black Sox, South Bend Benders, Terre Haute Terre-iers, Wheeling Stogies, Youngstown Steelmen and Zanesville Potters teams joined Springfield in beginning Central League play on April 24, 1912.

During the 1912 season, Springfield obtained pitcher Charlie Wheatley off waivers and he improved to make his major league debut that season. Wheatley began the 1912 season with the St. Joseph Drummers of the Class A level Western League. Wheatley was released by St. Joseph in May and signed with the Reapers, pitching well for Springfield. While pitching for Springfield, he was scouted by Bobby Lowe for the Detroit Tigers. Lowe recommended Wheatley to Hughie Jennings, the manager of the Tigers, and the Tigers purchased Wheatley from Springfield for $3,500 and Wheatley made his major league on September 6, 1912.

In their first season of returning to Central League play, the Springfield Reapers placed fourth in the final league standings of the large league. With a record of 72–54, the Reapers were managed by the returning Charley O'Day. Springfield finished 3.5 games behind the first place Fort Wayne Railroaders in the final regular season standings. No playoffs were held in the twelve-team league.

The Springfield Reapers continued play in the 1913 Central League, as the Central League reduced from twelve teams to six teams and remained a Class B level league. Placing third in the final standings of the six-team league, the Reapers had an overall record of 67–71. Springfield finished 24.0 games behind the first place Grand Rapids Bill-eds (92–48) in the final standings. The league held no playoffs, as Springfield was managed by Joe Stanley during the season. Bill Keene of Springfield hit 15 home runs to lead the league, while teammate George Brautigan led the Central League with 99 runs scored.

The Springfield Reapers folded before completing the 1914 Central League season. On August 8, 1914, Springfield folded from the six-team league with a record of 42–67. Joe Stanley returned as the Springfield manager. The Central League continued play to the end of the season with five teams, concluding the season September 7, 1914, with Springfield listed as the sixth-place team. Springfield ended the season 35.5 games behind the first place Dayton Veterans in the final standings.

Springfield did not host a minor league team in 1915 and the Central League continued play as an eight-team league.

=== Central League 1916 & 1917 ===
After a one season hiatus, the Springfield Reapers resumed minor league play and advanced to the league finals. Springfield returned to the Class B level Central League in 1916, with a future hall of fame pitcher on the roster and a local former major league catcher as their manager. The Reapers replaced the Youngstown Steelmen in the league. The Reapers manager was Joe Dunn, a Springfield native, who would serve as the Reapers manager for two seasons, before again reviving the Springfield franchise in 1928.

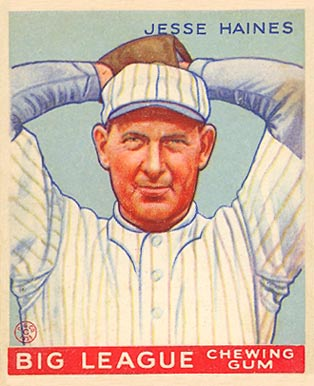
(1933) Baseball Hall of Fame member Jessie Haines. Baseball card. Haines pitched for the Springfield Reapers in 1916 and 1917.

In returning to the league in 1916, Springfield joined the Dayton Veterans, Evansville Evas, Grand Rapids Black Sox, Muskegon Reds, South Bend Benders, Terre Haute Highlanders and Wheeling Stogies teams in the eight-team Central League.

A former major league catcher for the Brooklyn Dodgers, manager Joe Dunn returned to his native Springfield in 1916 after serving as player/manager for the 1914 and 1915 Dallas Giants of the Texas League. In a 1915 game against Galveston, Dunn had a fight with an opposing player who reportedly insulted his membership in the Knights of Columbus. Dunn later announced that he would not be returning to manage Dallas. Dunn subsequently agreed to become player/manager for Springfield, where he and helped to develop pitchers Jesse Haines and Lou Lowdermilk in 1916.

The Reapers placed third in the eight–team Central League overall standings, ending the 1916 season with an overall record of 74–58, finishing 3.0 games behind the first place Grand Rapids Black Sox. With the league playing a spilt season schedule, Springfield advanced to the finals. The Dayton Veterans won the first half pennant, and the Springfield Reapers won the second half pennant. In the final, Dayton defeated Springfield 4 games to 2.

Baseball Hall of Fame member Jesse Haines played for the 1916 Springfield Reapers and returned to the team in 1917. Having spent part of 1915 on their major league roster without appearing in a game, Haines was sent by the Detroit Tigers to pitch for Springfield in 1916. At age 22, Haines won 23 gams pitching for Springfield in 1916, with a 1.68 ERA. In 1917, Haines again was sent by Detroit to pitch for Springfield, winning 19 games with a 1.83 ERA. Haines would make his major league debut with the Cincinnati Reds in 1918.

The 1917 Central League again utilized a split season schedule and Springfield had a second-place finish but did not qualify for the playoff. The Reapers ended the season in second place, with an overall record of 74–50, managed again by Joe Dunn. In the overall standings, Springfield finished 6.0 games behind the first place Grand Rapids Black Sox. Grand Rapids defeated the South Bend Benders/Peoria Distillers 4 games to 3 in the final as the two teams won the spilt season pennants. Frank Walker of Springfield won the Central League triple Crown. Walker batting title, hitting .370. Walker also led the league with 10 home runs, and had 169 RBI. His 161 hits and 94 runs scored also led the league. The Central League folded following the 1917 season and Springfield did not return to minor league play for ten seasons.

From 1918 to 1927, Springfield did not host a minor league team. In 1928, the Springfield Buckeyes began play when the Central League reformed, with Joe Dunn becoming the team owner and manager. Dunn had remained in Springfield following the 1917 season after getting married and starting a family while working in local industry.

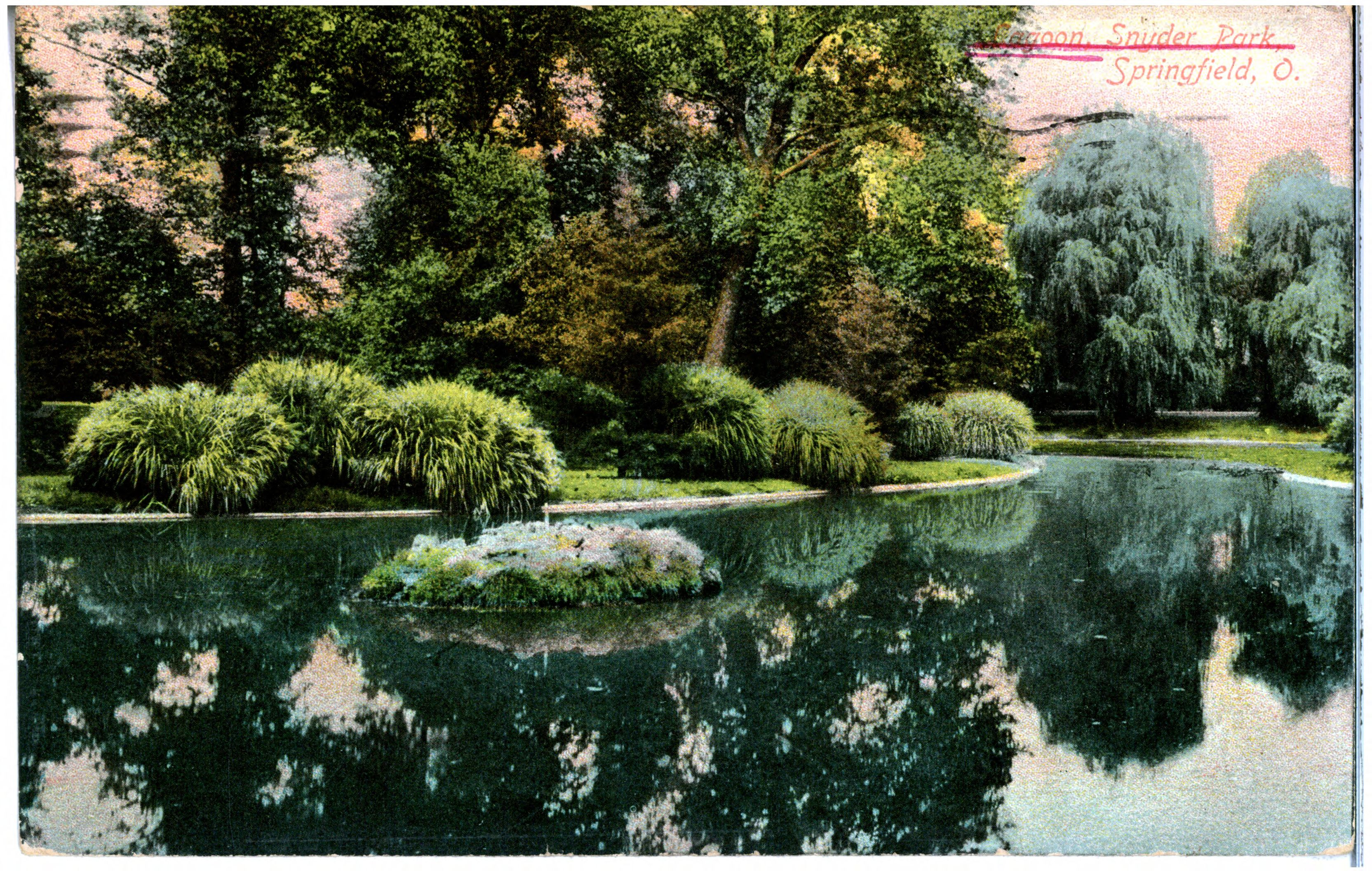
(1910) Postcard. Lagoon, Snyder Park. Springfield, Ohio. The 1,000-acre park contained Snyder Field, home to the Springfield Reapers.

== The ballpark ==
The Springfield Reapers teams hosted minor league home games at Snyder Field. Today, the site is still in use as part of Snyder Park, a public park. The Snyder Field ballpark was located on Park Street off Snyder Park Road in Springfield, Ohio.

The land for Snyder Park was donated to the city of Springfield by brothers John and David Snyder in 1895, with the parcel containing over 1,000 acres. After development, the park officially opened on April 22, 1897. The park itself was designed by architect Herman Haerlin.

== Timeline ==
Year(s)	# Yrs.	Team	Level	League	Ballpark
1908, 1911	2	Springfield Reapers	Class D	Ohio State League	Snyder Field
1912–1914	3	Springfield Reapers	Class B	Central League	Snyder Field
1916–1917	2	Springfield Reapers	Class B	Central League	Snyder Field

== Year-by-year records ==
Year	Record	Finish	Manager	Playoffs / Notes
1908	46–103	6th	Ed Ranskick / John Quinn	Team (17–30) moved to Portsmouth June 16
1911	84–55	1st	Charley O'Day	Won league championship No playoffs held
1912	72–54	4th	Charley O'Day	No playoffs held
1913	67–61	3rd	Joe Stanley	No playoffs held
1914	42–67	6th	Joe Stanley	Team folded August 8
1916	74–68	3rd	Joe Dunn	Won 2nd half pennant Lost in final
1917	77–50	2nd	Joe Dunn	Did not qualify

== Notable alumni ==
- Jesse Haines (1916–1917) Inducted Baseball Hall of Fame, 1970
- Ernie Alten (1917)
- Rivington Bisland (1912)
- George Boehler (1911)
- Jack Bushelman (1908)
- Ike Caveney (1916)
- John Daley (1916)
- Joe Dunn (1916–1917, MGR)
- John Fluhrer (1916)
- Rufus Gilbert (1912)
- Ted Goulait (1912)
- Stan Gray (1912)
- Tex Hoffman (1916)
- Bernie Hungling (1916)
- Bill Keen (1911–1914)
- Mickey Keliher (1913)
- John Kelleher (1913)
- Tacks Latimer (1908)
- Lou Lowdermilk (1916)
- Harry McCluskey (1916)
- Red McKee (1911–1912)
- Jack Mercer (1908)
- Bill Morley (1908) College Football Hall of Fame
- Ray Mowe (1912)
- Otto Neu (1914)
- Arch Reilly (1913–1914)
- Braggo Roth (1912)
- John Scheneberg (1916)
- John Shovlin (1916)
- Sherry Smith (1912)
- Frank Snyder (1913)
- Chet Spencer (1908, 1916)
- Vern Spencer (1916)
- Joe Stanley (1913–1914, MGR)
- Tuffy Stewart (1913)
- Fred Trautman (1913)
- Ted Turner (1914)
- Frank Walker (1917)
- Lefty Webb (1912)
- Charlie Wheatley (1912)
- Frank Withrow (1913–1914)
- Springfield Reapers players
