= Snipe Hansen =

Major League Baseball pitcher

- Pitcher
- Born: February 21, 1907; Chicago, Illinois, U.S.
- Died: September 11, 1978 (aged 71); Chicago, Illinois, U.S.
- Batted: Both Threw: Left

MLB debut
- July 5, 1930, for the Philadelphia Phillies

Last MLB appearance
- July 13, 1935, for the St. Louis Browns

MLB statistics
- Win–loss record: 22–45
- Earned run average: 5.01
- Strikeouts: 176
- Stats at Baseball Reference

Teams
- Philadelphia Phillies (1930, 1932–1935); St. Louis Browns (1935)

Roy Emil Frederick "Snipe" Hansen (February 21, 1907 – September 11, 1978) was an American left-handed pitcher in Major League Baseball. In a five-season major league career, he played for the Philadelphia Phillies and the St. Louis Browns. He was officially listed as standing 6 feet 3 inches (191 cm) and weighing 195 pounds (88 kg).

After opening his minor league career in the Chicago Cubs system, Hansen was purchased by the Phillies in 1930, playing for them that season and from 1932 to 1935. He won 22 games and lost 44 for the Philadelphia club, posting a 4.84 earned run average in 599 innings and splitting time between the starting rotation and the bullpen. Late in his major league career, he played a short time for the Browns, losing one game before returning to the minors at the end of his career.

== Early years ==
Roy Emil Frederick Hansen was born in Chicago on February 21, 1907. He acquired his nickname during his first spring training with the Chicago Cubs, when the team prepared for the season on Catalina Island, southwest of Los Angeles. Jim Vitti, author of The Cubs on Catalina, told of Hansen's trip to the bottom of a canyon on the island, led by two teammates who gave him a burlap bag and disappeared, ostensibly to flush out the snipe. Hours later, he returned to the hotel "where he found the entire Cub team waiting for him in the lobby, falling over with laughter". The "Snipe" moniker remained with him for the remainder of his career.

== Minor leagues ==
Hansen was signed by the Cubs for a tryout in 1927, described by the Miami News as "the first native son hurler to reseive [sic] a tryout in a long time". Chicago assigned him to their double-A affiliate, the Reading Keystones, where he appeared in 34 games during the 1927 season. Notching the team's third-worst winning percentage (.111) with one win against eight losses, he amassed a 6.99 earned run average (ERA), allowing 99 runs in 94 innings pitched. Hansen was reported to be on the Reading staff again during 1928's spring training, with the Keystones still anticipating his arrival as late as mid-April, but he played the entire 1928 season for the unaffiliated Elmira Colonels, posting a 12–17 win–loss record in 229 innings (37 games; tied for most pitching appearances on the club). Hansen led the Colonels in runs allowed, earned runs, and walks, allowing 241 hits on the season and collecting a 4.14 ERA.

In 1929, Hansen re-surfaced with Chicago on the way to spring training at Catalina, and spent that season in the minor leagues with the Dayton Aviators, where he accumulated a 5.16 ERA (105 earned runs in 150 innings), winning seven games and losing eleven. He struck out 78 batters that season against 68 walks, allowing 166 hits. After spending the first three months of the 1930 season with the Richmond Roses, where he posted an 11–9 record and a 4.50 ERA in 162 innings, Hansen was purchased by the Philadelphia Phillies.

== Major leagues ==
=== 1930: Major league debut ===
Hansen made his first Phillies appearance on July 5, 1930, pitching five innings in the first game of a doubleheader against the Boston Braves. He allowed three runs (one earned) in his first contest, striking out four batters and walking two. His next four games, however, all resulted in defeats; Hansen gave up the losing run to the New York Giants out of the bullpen on July 7, and started his next three contests, losing all three to drop his major league record of 0–4. In two more July contests, he lost one more game, raising his ERA for the month to 5.25.

In August, Hansen posted his first scoreless major league appearance, but lost one more game in four starts and allowed a season-high 14 hits in 6 1/3 innings on August 29. Hansen's ERA continued to climb in September, reaching a season high of 6.80 on September 23 after he allowed 16 runs in 7 September appearances. After a scoreless appearance in his final game of the season, Hansen's final statistics for the major league portion of his 1930 season consisted of an 0–7 record, a 6.72 ERA, and 25 strikeouts against 38 walks.

=== 1931–1932: Between minors and majors ===
In 1931, Hansen played the entire year for two Class-A minor league teams: the Dallas Steers and the Fort Worth Panthers, for whom he posted a 16–9 record and a 2.66 ERA, posting 87 walks. His option was picked up by the Phillies in September, and he was recalled to Philadelphia in spring of 1932. That year, Hansen was the Phillies' third starter and led the rotation in ERA, with a 3.72 mark as its youngest regular pitcher by five years. In his second appearance of the season, Hansen started against the Giants, losing the game when he allowed six runs in 1/3 inning. He atoned the next day, however, when he started against the Giants, pitching a complete game, allowing one earned run, and lowering his ERA from 16.20 to 3.38; Hansen's contest was called a "remarkable comeback" by the Reading Eagle.

He made three starts in May, winning one game and losing one, and notched his first save of the year on May 15 against the Cubs. After repeating the same 1–1 record in June, Hansen won two games and lost three in July, posting his second complete game in his final appearance of the month. He collected a second save on August 2, and earned a decision in nine of his final ten appearances through August and September, winning one more game than he lost to draw his final record for the season to 10–10. He struck out 56 batters on the year against 51 walks, completing five games in 23 starts (39 appearances).

=== 1933: Young gun ===
Still the youngest member of Philadelphia's rotation, Hansen began the 1933 season pitching out of the Phillies bullpen, making five appearances before his first start. On May 21, he pitched a complete game, losing to the Cincinnati Reds when he allowed four runs through eight innings. His next two decisions, both starts, were also losses, dropping his record to 0–3. Hansen did win his first game in June, however, and lost his fourth on June 24, beginning a string of consecutive decisions. He earned victories in his next three starts, all of which were complete games; in the second contest, he pitched 11 consecutive innings to defeat the Reds. Hansen lost his next two starts before earning his only save of the season on August 2. In his final 11 appearances of that season, Hansen won two games and lost eight, eschewing a decision only once on August 26, to finish the season with a 6–14 record; he walked 30 batters, the lowest number in the starting rotation, but collected that group's second-worst ERA (4.44) and winning percentage (.300).

=== 1934: Transition to bullpen ===
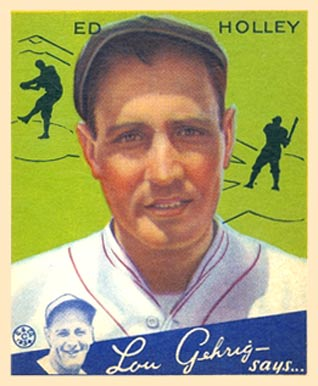
Although a reliever in 1934, Hansen still out-started the Phillies' fourth starting pitcher, Ed Holley.

In the 1934 season, Hansen transitioned to a relief pitcher's role, although he still made more starts than Ed Holley, the fourth member of the Phillies' starting rotation. He was second only to Curt Davis in appearances on the team that year, and led the team's relievers in innings pitched (151). That year, Hansen earned his first victory in a complete-game performance against the Braves on May 1, allowing six runs in an 11–6 contest. His next appearance, however, resulted in a loss when he allowed eight runs (five earned) on seven hits against the Cubs. Hansen notched two saves in the next month: one on May 20, and the second on June 3; he was saddled with his second loss against Chicago on June 14.

In July, he won two games (July 4 and 14)—the latter the first complete-game shutout of his career—lost three (July 6, 12, and 27), and saved one (July 7); August was less successful, when he amassed a record of 1–3. Hansen clinched his second career shutout with a 1–0 win over Cincinnati on September 2, but lost four more games in the month against a lone win for a final record of 6–12. For the year, he struck out 40 batters and walked a career-high 61, posting a 5.42 ERA and allowing a career-worst 112 runs. He was one of ten pitchers to lead the National League in fielding percentage with a perfect 1.000 mark.

=== 1935: Three-team trades ===
Hansen opened the 1935 season by allowing two runs to the Brooklyn Dodgers in 1 1/3 innings on April 16. A week later, he faced Brooklyn again, this time allowing five runs (four earned) in three innings. Hansen earned his first loss of the season in the latter game, the only start he made that year. He remained with the Phillies, unused, until he was traded to the Washington Senators on May 10 for Ray Prim and Tommy Thomas.

Washington traded Hansen to the St. Louis Browns four weeks later for future considerations, and he made his debut against the Senators on June 15, allowing three runs in four innings. His next two outings yielded similar results: three runs allowed in each, but both games were single-inning affairs for Hansen. In the team's final June contest, he allowed ten runs (nine earned) to the Detroit Tigers in an 18–1 St. Louis loss. Hansen's fortunes seemed to reverse in July, as he allowed only a single run through his first four outings of the month; however, that run he gave up earned him his second loss of the season, although it was an unearned tally. Used in both games of a doubleheader during his final two outings, he pitched a scoreless 1 1/3 innings in the early game but allowed six runs in the nightcap, resulting in his return to Washington. For the remainder of the 1935 season, Hansen played for the Senators' minor league affiliates in Chattanooga and Albany, where he collected a 7–10 record and a 4.28 ERA.

== Late career ==
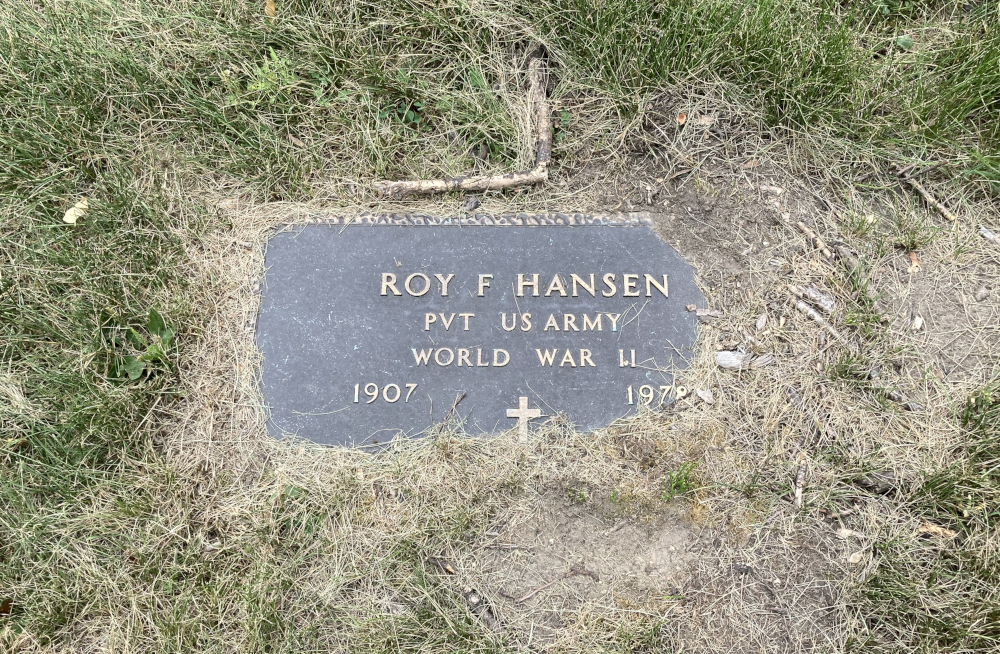
Hansen's grave at Rosehill Cemetery

Hansen played for the Steers again in 1936, but made only two appearances, losing both games. In 1937, he played for the Oklahoma City Indians and the Galveston Buccaneers, winning 5 games in 17 appearances in his final season. He allowed 77 hits in 75 innings, walking 46 batters and collecting a 4.44 ERA before retiring.

Hansen died on September 11, 1978, in his hometown of Chicago and was interred at Rosehill Cemetery.
