= Joe Dunn (baseball) =

American baseball player (1885-1944)

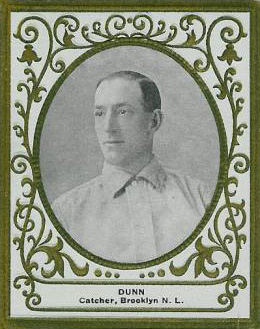
- Catcher
- Born: March 11, 1885; Springfield, Ohio, U.S.
- Died: March 19, 1944 (aged 59); Springfield, Ohio, U.S.
- Batted: Right Threw: Right

MLB debut
- September 12, 1908, for the Brooklyn Superbas

Last MLB appearance
- September 26, 1909, for the Brooklyn Superbas

MLB statistics
- Batting average: .169
- Home runs: 0
- Runs batted in: 7
- Stats at Baseball Reference

Teams
- Brooklyn Superbas (1908–1909)

Joseph Edward Dunn (March 11, 1885 – March 19, 1944) was an American professional baseball player who played catcher for the Brooklyn Superbas during the 1908 and 1909 baseball seasons.

He became a minor league baseball manager after his playing career ended, winning league championships in 1919, 1920 and 1930.

Dunn was a key figure in reestablishing minor league baseball in his hometown of Springfield, Ohio in 1928. Without a team since 1917, Dunn and his siblings Charles and Katherine had formed the "Springfield Baseball Club Inc." to secure a franchise as the Central League was reforming. The three siblings sold some shared of the franchise stock to Frank Navin, who was the owner of the Detroit Tigers. They received $5,000 from Navin for the stock. In return, Navin secured a percentage of the ballpark concessions and held first-refusal rights on any players that Springfield signed. The Springfield team was then established.

The Springfield Dunnmen were named for their manager in 1929, one season before Dunn led Springfield to the Central League championship.

On Sunday, March 19, 1944, residing in Springfield, Dunn became ill during a church service and was taken to the nearby Bancroft Hotel, where died in the lobby of a heart attack. He is buried in Calvary Cemetery in Springfield. Kitty Dunn, his wife, lived in the family home until her death in 1968.

== Minor league managing career ==
- Dallas Giants (1915)
- Springfield Reapers (1916–1917)
- Bloomington Bloomers (1919–1921)
- Denver Bears (1922)
- Birmingham Barons (1922)
- Evansville Little Evas (1924)
- Evansville Pocketeers (1925)
- Elmira Colonels (1926–1927)
- Springfield Buckeyes (1928)
- Springfield Dunnmen (1929)
- Springfield Blue Sox (1930)
- Bloomington Cubs (1931)
