= Joe Stanley (1900s outfielder) =

American baseball player (1881–1967)

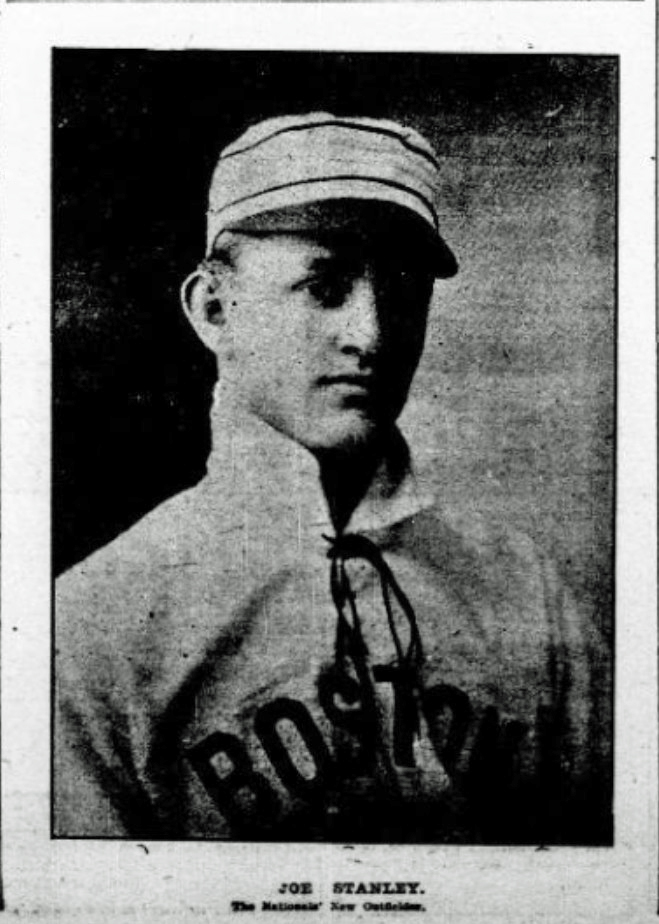
- Pitcher
- Born: April 2, 1881; Washington, D.C., U.S.
- Died: September 13, 1967 (aged 86); Detroit, Michigan, U.S.
- Batted: Switch Threw: Right

MLB debut
- September 11, 1897, for the Washington Senators

Last MLB appearance
- September 26, 1909, for the Chicago Cubs

MLB statistics
- Batting average: .213
- Home runs: 2
- Runs batted in: 76
- Stats at Baseball Reference

Teams
- Washington Senators (NL) (1897); Washington Senators (1902); Boston Beaneaters (1903–1904); Washington Senators (1905–1906); Chicago Cubs (1909)

Joseph Bernard Stanley (April 2, 1881 – September 13, 1967) was an American Major League Baseball pitcher. He played all or part of seven season in the majors, between 1897 and 1909.Stanley debuted in the major leagues as a pitcher at the age of 16 for the National League's Washington Senators. He pitched just two-thirds of an inning, and did not appear in the majors again for five years. Over the rest of his MLB career, he pitched just twice more. After his major league career, Stanley continued to play Minor League Baseball until 1916. He also managed the Springfield Reapers (1913–14) and Lynchburg Shoemakers (1917).

== Sources ==
- Career statistics from Baseball Reference · Baseball Reference (Minors) · Retrosheet · Baseball Almanac
