= Ralph Shafer =

American baseball player (1894–1950)

- Pinch runner
- Born: March 17, 1894; Cincinnati, Ohio, U.S.
- Died: February 5, 1950 (aged 55); Akron, Ohio, U.S.
- Batted: Unknown Threw: Unknown

MLB debut
- July 25, 1914, for the Pittsburgh Pirates

Last MLB appearance
- July 25, 1914, for the Pittsburgh Pirates

MLB statistics
- Games played: 1
- Stats at Baseball Reference

Teams
- Pittsburgh Pirates (1914)

Ralph Newton Shafer (March 17, 1894 – February 5, 1950) was an American Major League Baseball pinch-runner. Shafer played for the Pittsburgh Pirates in 1914. In 1 career game, he had no at-bats, only pinch-running. Shafer was born in Cincinnati, Ohio and died in Akron, Ohio. He attended the University of Cincinnati.

After his brief major league career, Shafer played several years of minor league baseball, where he played primarily outfielder. He played for the Lexington Colts in 1914 and 1915, the Terre Haute Highlanders in 1916, and the Kitchener Beavers in 1921 and 1922 During this time, he split his time between playing the outfield and second base.
