= Wayland Dean =

American baseball player (1902–1930)

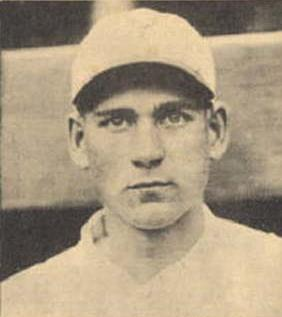
- Pitcher
- Born: June 20, 1902; Richwood, West Virginia, U.S.
- Died: April 11, 1930 (aged 27); Huntington, West Virginia, U.S.
- Batted: Right Threw: Right

MLB debut
- April 17, 1924, for the New York Giants

Last MLB appearance
- July 13, 1927, for the Chicago Cubs

MLB statistics
- Win–loss record: 24–36
- Earned run average: 4.87
- Strikeouts: 147
- Stats at Baseball Reference

Teams
- New York Giants (1924–1925); Philadelphia Phillies (1926–1927); Chicago Cubs (1927)

Wayland Ogden Dean (June 20, 1902 – April 11, 1930) was an American Major League Baseball pitcher. He played seven seasons in professional baseball, four at the major league level. In his major league career, Dean went 24–36 with a 4.87 ERA, 1 save, and 147 strikeouts in 96 games, and 60 starts.

== Professional career ==
=== Early minor league career ===
Dean began his professional career in 1922 with the Class-C Daytona Beach Islanders. He went 8–6 with 77 runs allowed in 19 games with the Islanders. Later that season, Dean played for the Class-AA Louisville Colonels of the American Association. In 11 games, Dean went 3–5 with a 4.88 ERA. The next season, Dean continued to play for the Colonels. He went 21–8 with a 3.27 ERA in 36 games that season. Dean ended the season fifth in the league in wins.

=== New York Giants ===
Dean was purchased by the New York Giants after being described by The New York Times as being the "most-sought-after young twirler in the minor leagues." Dean refused to sign a contract offered to him by the Giants in January of that year. In his major league debut, the Giants lost to the Washington Nationals 3–2. On the season, Dean went 6–12 with a 5.01 ERA, and 39 strikeouts in 26 games, 20 starts. In 1925, Dean played his second season with the Giants. On June 12, Dean was injured after he was struck in the knee during batting practice before a game against the Pittsburgh Pirates at Forbes Field. Dean also struck out Hall of Famer Mel Ott in Ott's first major league at-bat. On the season, Dean went 10–7 with a 4.64 ERA, 1 save, and 53 strikeouts.

=== Philadelphia Phillies ===
In January 1926, the Giants traded Dean to the Philadelphia Phillies along with Jack Bentley for Jimmy Ring. With the Phillies that season, Dean went 8–16 with a 4.91 ERA, and 52 strikeouts in 33 games, 26 starts. His 111 earned runs allowed led all pitchers in the National League. The next season, Dean again played for the Phillies. On May 26, 1927, Dean was suspended by Phillies manager Stuffy McInnis after Dean didn't report to the team for two days straight. With the Phillies that season, Dean went 0–1 in 2 games with 4 earned runs.

=== Chicago Cubs ===
On June 2, 1927, Dean was sold by the Phillies to the Chicago Cubs. With the Cubs, Dean pitched 2 games and compiled no win–loss record, and gave up no earned runs.

=== Later minor league career ===
On February 21, 1928, Dean was traded by the Cubs to the Louisville Colonels for Ed Holly. That season marked Dean's return to the Class-AA Louisville Colonels, where he was first discovered by the New York Giants. In 4 games with the Colonels, Dean went 0–1, and gave up no earned runs. His season was cut short when he became ill with tuberculosis, and was sent to Tucson, Arizona because doctors concluded that his only chance of survival was to be in the city's climate. The Pittsburgh Press criticized Dean on his choices throughout his career, writing, "[Dean] was a careless fellow, who went the pace headlong." Dean did, however, recover and played the next season with the Class-B Dayton Aviators of the Central League, this time as an outfielder. In 511 at-bats with the Aviators, Dean batted .317 with 32 doubles, 7 triples, and 22 home runs. That season, Dean was fifth in the league in home runs. Dean became ill again and was forced into retirement. He died on April 11, 1930, in his parents house at the age of 27, afflicted with tuberculosis. After his death, Dean's former manager in Louisville, Joe McCarthy, named Dean as the best player he had ever sold to the major leagues.
