= George Wheeler (pinch hitter) =

American baseball player (1881–1918)

- Pinch hitter
- Born: November 10, 1881; Shelburn, Indiana, U.S.
- Died: August 3, 1918 (aged 36); Clinton, Indiana, U.S.
- Batted: Left Threw: Right

MLB debut
- July 27, 1910, for the Cincinnati Reds

Last MLB appearance
- August 3, 1910, for the Cincinnati Reds

MLB statistics
- Batting average: .000
- Home runs: 0
- Runs batted in: 0
- Stats at Baseball Reference

Teams
- Cincinnati Reds (1910)

George Harrison "Heavy" Wheeler (November 10, 1881 – June 18, 1918) was an American Major League Baseball pinch hitter who played in three games for the Cincinnati Reds in 1910. He was an outfielder during his minor league career.

Wheeler made his major league debut on July 27, 1910, at the age of 28 and appeared in his final big league game on August 3 of that year. In three at-bats with the Reds, Wheeler collected zero hits, striking out twice.

Though Wheeler's major league career was short, his minor league career lasted eight seasons, from 1907 to 1914. In 119 games with the Terre Haute Hottentots in 1908 he hit .303, and in 124 games in 1913 – split between the Terre Haute Terre-iers and Indianapolis Indians – he hit .320. Overall, he hit .287 in 810 minor league games.

Following his death, he was interred at Little Flock Cemetery in Shelburn, Indiana.
