= Clyde Hatter =

American baseball player (1908–1937)

- Hatter c. 1935 (Photo from Detroit Public Library)
- Pitcher
- Born: August 7, 1908; Poplar Hills, Kentucky, U.S.
- Died: October 17, 1937 (aged 29); Yosemite, Kentucky, U.S.
- Batted: Right Threw: Left

MLB debut
- April 23, 1935, for the Detroit Tigers

Last MLB appearance
- May 10, 1937, for the Detroit Tigers

MLB statistics
- Games: 11
- ERA: 8.44
- Win–loss record: 1–0

Teams
- Detroit Tigers (1935, 1937)

Clyde Melno Hatter (August 7, 1908 – October 16, 1937), also known as the "Mad Hatter", was a left-handed pitcher who played professional baseball for eight years from 1930 to 1937, including two stints in Major League Baseball in 1935 and 1937.

A native of Kentucky, Hatter played college baseball for Eastern Kentucky State Teachers College in 1928 and 1929. He signed with the Louisville Colonels in October 1929 and spent five years playing in the minor leagues, including four seasons with the Colonels. In September 1934, he was purchased by the Detroit Tigers. He played for the Tigers during parts of the 1935 and 1937 seasons, compiling a 1–0 record and 8.44 earned run average (ERA) in 11 major league games.

Hatter concluded his playing career with the Toledo Mud Hens in 1937. He was plagued by alcohol and behavioral problems as well as a 1936 nervous breakdown. He died in October 1937 at age 28 after being discovered unconscious in the backseat of his father's car. Newspapers attributed Hatter's death to a heart attack, though teammate Marv Owen attributed it to alcohol.

== Early years ==
Hatter was born in Poplar Hills, Kentucky, in 1908. He began pitching in the seventh grade in Liberty, Kentucky. He also pitched for Middleburg High School in Middleburg, Kentucky. He once struck out 20 of 21 batters, and caught a pop fly for the other out, in a seven-inning game against Bradfordsville.

== Eastern Kentucky ==
Hatter attended Eastern Kentucky State Teachers College. He played for the Eastern Kentucky baseball team in 1928 and 1929. In an April 1928 game, he struck out 20 of a possible 24 batters against Georgetown College. He later struck out 23 batters, striking out three batters in five innings, against Transylvania. On April 22, 1929, he threw a no-hitter, the first in school history, against Kentucky Wesleyan. Five days later, he struck out 14 batters and threw a four-hit shutout against the University of Louisville Cardinals. The Courier-Journal reported: "Hatter's control featured the game and he was the master of the situation at all times."

During the 1929 season, Hatter won 27 of 29 games and averaged 14 strikeouts per game. His two losses were one-run decisions, including a 1–0 loss to Louisville.

== Professional baseball ==
=== Minor leagues (1930–1934) ===
After Eastern Kentucky concluded its 1929 season, Hatter pitched for an independent team in Somerset, Kentucky, threw a no-hitter against a Chattanooga team, and compiled a 19–0 record in 19 games pitched.

In August 1929, the Louisville Colonels of the American Association began pursuing Hatter. After an initial try-out, the Colonels offered Hatter a contract, but he refused to sign in a disagreement over the amount of his signing bonus. Hatter ultimately signed a contract with Colonels on October 29, 1929, in exchange for a signing bonus of $1,000.

In April 1930, the Colonels sent Hatter to the Dayton Aviators of the Class B Central League. In his first professional game, on April 29, 1930, Hatter pitched "masterful ball" for five innings and struck out nine batters, allowed two hits and no earned runs, walked five batters, and was reportedly wild but "just wild enough to be effective." On September 14, 1930, Hatter pitched a no-hitter and struck out 23 batters in a 3–0 victory over Livingston. He appeared in 40 games for Dayton in 1930, compiling a 12–15 record with 217 strikeouts and a 5.14 earned run average (ERA) in 247 innings pitched.

In 1931, Hatter was elevated to the Class AA Colonels. He appeared in 31 games and compiled an 11–12 record with a 4.66 ERA. He remained with the Colonels for four years from 1931 to 1934. In 1934, he compiled an 8–12 record and struck out 170 batters with 3.39 ERA in 178 innings pitched.

=== Detroit Tigers (1935 season) ===
On September 10, 1934, the Colonels sold Hatter to the Detroit Tigers in exchange for Rip Sewell. The deal allowed Hatter to remain with Louisville through the remainder of the 1934 season and provided that the Tigers would also pay Louisville $15,000 if Hatter remained with the Tigers after June 15, 1935. Hatter was known as the "Mad" Hatter while with Detroit.

Hatter made his major league debut on April 23, 1935, entering the game in the seventh inning as a relief pitcher and pitching two innings against the Chicago White Sox. In late April, Detroit manager Mickey Cochrane said: "Hatter has a good fastball and an exceptional curve. He is inclined to be wild. Better control will make him a valuable pitcher. He has a good disposition . . ."

On July 13, 1935, Hatter had a disastrous outing against the Philadelphia Athletics at Shibe Park. Pitching in relief, he gave up 19 hits, five walks, and 11 runs in an 18–5 loss. Four days later, he was sent to the Milwaukee Brewers. At the time of Hatter's demotion, Charles P. Ward wrote in the Detroit Free Press: "The silent southpaw looked like a big league pitcher during the spring training season but has not looked so good since the American League season opened. His doom was sealed when he relieved Elden Auker in the opening game of the series in Philadelphia and was batted about like a batting practice pitcher of the first order."

During his three months with the Tigers during the 1935 season, Hatter appeared eight games, two as a starter, pitching 33-1/3 innings with no decisions and a 7.56 ERA.

=== Milwaukee Brewers (1935–1936) ===
After being sent to the Brewers in July 1935, Hatter performed well. He compiled a 7–3 record and 2.88 ERA in 14 games for the Brewers in 1935. In 1936, he appeared in 38 games for the Brewers, 30 as a starter, led the American Association with 16 wins, and compiled a 16–6 record with a 4.52 ERA. At the end of the 1936 season, Hatter reportedly suffered a "nervous breakdown" and failed to appear at the ball park for the opening game of the 1936 Little World Series. Teammates discovered him in a hotel where he was reported to be ill.

=== Detroit Tigers (1937) ===
In March 1937, and after two strong seasons with Milwaukee, Hatter was returned to the Tigers for spring training. He made the Tigers opening day roster and appeared in three games during the 1937 season. He compiled a 1–0 record and 11.57 ERA in 9-1/3 inning pitched. He appeared in his final major league game on May 10, 1937. On May 15, 1937, he was released on option by the Tigers to the Toledo Mud Hens. At the time, Charles P. Ward of the Detroit Free Press wrote:

"Hatter has been a disappointment this year just as he has been on two previous occasions. He has everything required of a major league hurler but control and Cochrane blames his lack of control on tension."

In addition to Cochrane's comment attributing Hatter's problems to "tension", other accounts report that Hatter continued to suffer from relapses following his 1936 nervous breakdown. He reportedly lacked confidence and would become upset the day before he was scheduled to pitch.

Teammate Marv Owen later gave another account as to the reason for Hatter's release. According to Owen, Hatter failed to show up at the ballpark for a couple days, claiming to be sick. Owen asked the team doctor to check on Hatter, and the doctor discovered two glasses of whisky in a bureau drawer in Hatter's room and concluded that Hatter was drunk. After manager Mickey Cochrane was told of the incident, Cochrane sent Hatter to Toledo. Owen recalled thinking, "Holy Almighty, I probably ruined his whole goddamn career."

=== Toledo Mud Hens (1937) ===
After being sent to Toledo in May 1937, Hatter's life spiraled downward. He was suspended for 30 days for breaking training rules. On July 6, he was hospitalized in Toledo after collapsing unconscious in the back of at taxi. Hatter claimed at the time that he had taken capsules for a headache. A later account reported that he "took an overdose of a sleeping potion" while returning to his hotel.

On August 20, 1937, Hatter retired the first 16 batters and pitched a two-hit victory over the Minneapolis Millers. On the night of his two-hit victory, Hatter disappeared. After an absence of five days, he showed up at a Toledo hotel where he was reported to be disturbing guests. Team officials were summoned and came to the scene. When they were unable to control Hatter, they consented to his arrest. He was reportedly taken to a sanitarium and released the next day into the custody of his brother.

On September 8, 1937, Hatter returned to the Mud Hens and pitched for a 4–3 victory over the Indianapolis Indians. Three days later, he allowed six runs and lacked control in a game against the Louisville Colonels. In all, Hatter appeared in nine games for the Mud Hens in 1937, six as a starter, and compiled a 3–0 record with a 5.22 ERA.

== Death ==
A newspaper account published on September 29, 1937, reported the Mud Hens had offered to give Hatter "the best of medical attention during the coming winter to bring him back to tip-top physical condition", and that the Mud Hens had assigned a "chaperon" to Hatter, but the chaperon had not kept him in shape to pitch. The account further opined that Hatter had blown two shots at the majors due to his behavior and was "of little use to the Mud Hens during the past campaign because of his wayward acts."

Less than three weeks later, on October 17, 1937, Hatter died near Yosemite, Kentucky, at age 29. Accounts as to the cause of Hatter's death are conflicting. The Courier-Journal in Louisville reported that he suffered from a stomach ailment, traveled with his father to Danville, Kentucky, and died of a heart attack in the backseat of his father's automobile while returning to his home in Yosemite. According to that report, Hatter's father believed Hatter was sleeping in the backseat but was unable to revive him after arriving home. The coroner's death certificate reported: "Died suddenly before I arrived – Probably Heart Disease." Teammate Marv Owen recalled events differently. Interviewed in the 1980s, Owen reported on Hatter's death this way: "He went home that winter and they found him dead in the back of his father's car. From booze."
