= Recreation Park (El Segundo) =

Park in El Segundo, California, United States

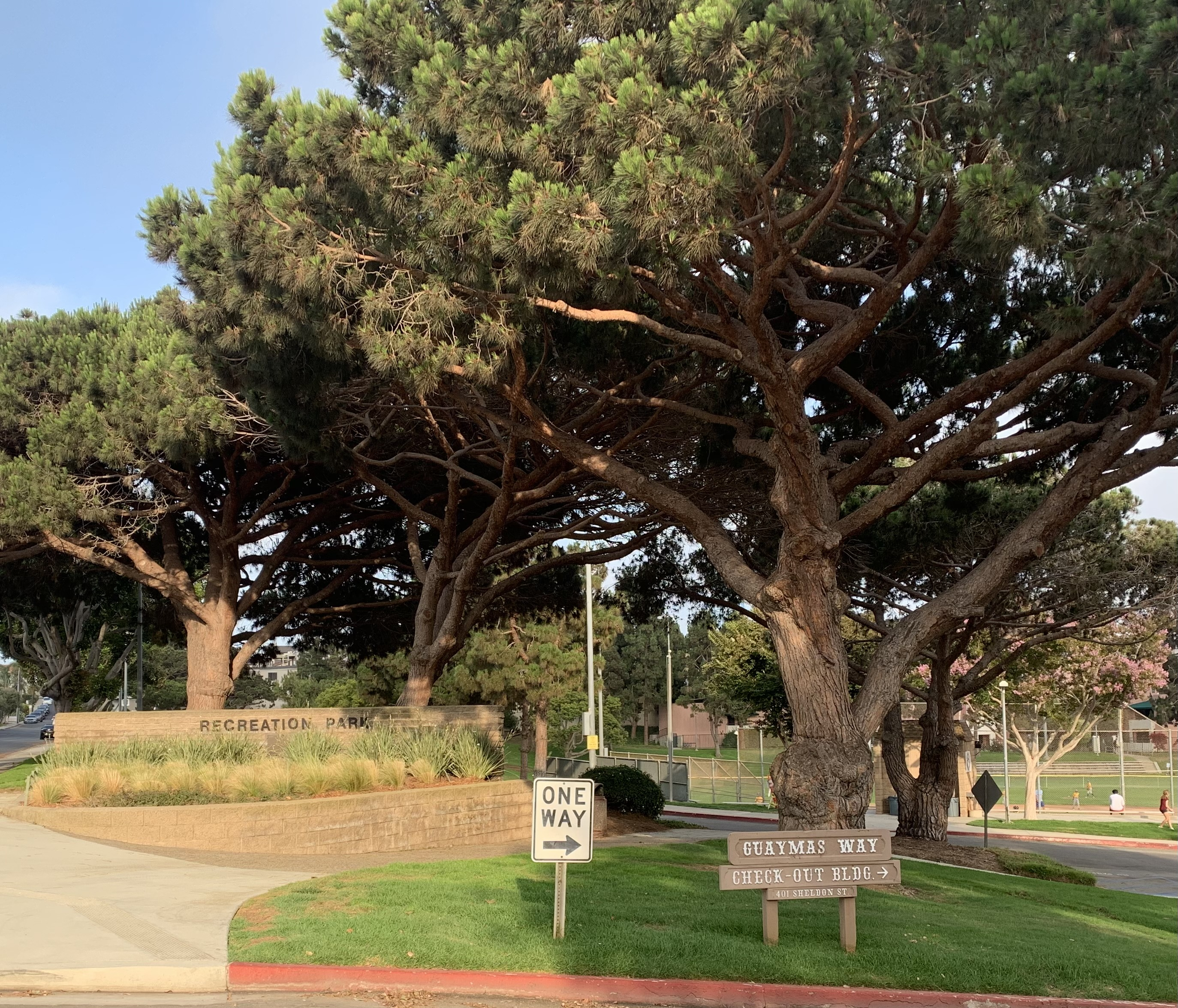
- Interactive map of Recreation Park
- Type: Urban park
- Location: El Segundo, California
- Coordinates: 33.9211°N 118.4124°W
- Area: 18.5 acres (7.5 ha)
- Operator: El Segundo Recreation and Parks Department
- Status: Open all year

Recreation Park. is a public, urban park in El Segundo, California, a suburb of Los Angeles. Located adjacent to Downtown El Segundo, Recreation Park is bordered by Pine Street on the North, Eucalyptus Drive on the West, and houses on the South and East.
