= Recreation Park (Grand Rapids, Michigan) =

Baseball park in Michigan, US

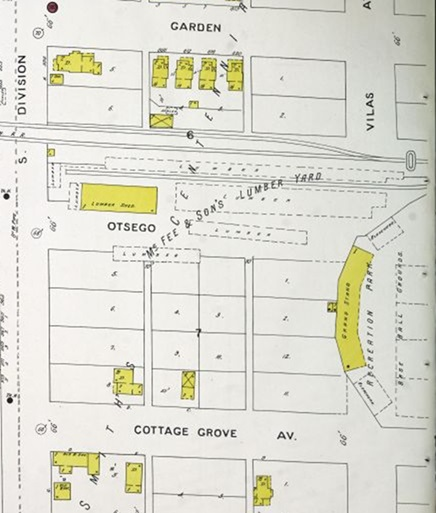
- Location: Grand Rapids, Michigan 1895 Sanborn fire insurance map noting grandstand and bleachers of Recreation Park.
- Capacity: 1,600 (1894), 2,500 (1899)
- Surface: Grass
- Field size: Left – 235 ft. Center – <450 ft. Right – 280 ft.

Construction
- Built: 1894
- Opened: 1894
- Closed: 1900
- Demolished: 1900

Tenants
- Grand Rapids (baseball) (WL) (1894-1897); Grand Rapids Furnituremakers (Interstate League)(1898-1899); Grand Rapids Prodigals (WL) (1899)

Recreation Park was a baseball park in Grand Rapids, Michigan. It was also used for other spectacles, such as travelling shows.

== Construction ==
It was built hastily within five weeks during the spring of 1894 in advance of the first Western League season under league president Ban Johnson at a cost of $1,500 and originally seated about 1,600. The funds for the grandstands were provided by the citizens of Grand Rapids. The grandstands were located about 400 feet from Division Avenue facing east. The park was bound by the present-day CSX railroad tracks, Jefferson Avenue, Division Avenue, and Cottage Grove Street. Today the area is a bowl-shaped greenspace fenced in completely, situated behind the northbound Cottage Grove substation of The Rapid Silver Line rapid transit Line on Division Avenue.

== Baseball ==
The baseball grounds was home to two Western League franchises inside of a five-year period, 1894–1899. As such, Recreation Park is a bygone cradle of the American League, and hosted franchises which would eventually find their ways to two modern-day American League cities: Boston and, more directly, Cleveland.

The first franchise started play in 1894 under the management of George E. "Deacon" Ellis, future mayor of Grand Rapids, and continued through to the end of the 1897 season. It was known by several names - the Rippers, the Rustlers, the Goldbugs, and the Bob-o-links. (See also Grand Rapids (baseball)) This first WL franchise moved for the 1898 season to Omaha, where it would not survive the season. After finishing in St. Joseph, Missouri, the franchise was moved to Buffalo for the 1899 and 1900 seasons, before being vacated to Boston, where it presently competes as the Boston Red Sox.

Following this first departure of the Western League from Grand Rapids, an Interstate League franchise managed by Frank Torreyson played at Recreation Park during the 1898 season and the first half of the 1899 season. During his tenure, Torreyson expanded the seating, adding two bleachers which hugged the right field corner, raising the seating capacity to just under 2,500. He also erected a new clubhouse, which was located on the southeast corner of the property, just beyond the added bleachers. Dimensions for the park are obscure to posterity. A ground rule stated that a ball clearing the left field fence between the foul line and a white marker to the right some short distance yielded a two-base hit, as the fence at the left field foul line was only 235 feet. Assuming the accuracy of the Sanborn fire insurance imagery, straight away center field, given the proximity to Jefferson Avenue, was no more than 450 feet, while right field measured 280 feet. Its measurements as well as the frequent overcrowding in seating led Grand Rapids Prodigal rookie Sam Crawford to refer to it as "that little park."

A second Western League franchise was located here in July 1899, by co-owner and manager Tom Loftus, and were called the Grand Rapids Prodigals. Crowds approaching twice the seating capacity jammed the little park, sitting on the grass all the way down the right field line - the left field was unavailable for this and for further building as it was tightly flanked by the railroad tracks.

== Area and other uses ==
The park was built in an area of lumber yards and sawmills, and while the availability of lumber undoubtedly contributed to construction, the dustiness was a frequent complaint of patrons to the grounds. Furthermore, the groundskeeping had to contend with splotchy, yellowing grass and an infield which was more sand than lawn. When built in 1894, the park proved adequate for its purpose but soon became outmoded as Western League cities were building newer, larger stadia for teams playing in a league whose status change into a major league was often speculated. Adding to it the difficult configuration, and Grand Rapids' own precarious existence in that near-major league, its further development was precluded. When the newly renamed American League left Grand Rapids in February 1900 and moved the franchise to Cleveland, where they now play as the Cleveland Guardians, the park was abandoned for future baseball purposes and torn down later that year. For much of the 20th Century, the site was the home of the Macey Furniture Company factory and warehouse. The aforementioned bowl-shaped greenspace was in fact an artificial creation, a remnant of the giant subterrain levels of the Macey building, which burned to the ground in 1979. In the days of Recreation Park, the ballpark existed on flat ground level to the tracks.

Recreation Park was also used for traveling tent shows, circuses, and Wild West shows, facilitated by the park's easy access to the railroad line.

== External Sources ==
Recreation Park at SABR Bio Project
