= Recreation Park (Raymore) =

Public park in Raymore, Missouri, US

- Interactive map of Recreation Park
- Type: Public park
- Location: Raymore, Missouri
- Coordinates: 38.7877°N 94.454°W
- Area: 80 acres (32 ha)
- Operator: City of Raymore
- Status: Open all year

Recreation Park is a public, urban park in Raymore, Missouri. Located on the southern end of Raymore, Recreation Park is bordered by South Madison Street on the West and Hubach Hill Road on the South. The park contains numerous soccer fields, a baseball complex with concessions, two shelter houses with additional concessions, walking paths, and a playground. It is also home to the Raymore Skate Park and Recreation Park Pond.
