= Fans Field (Bloomington) =

Baseball park in Bloomington, Illinois

"RT Dunn Fields"
- Interactive map of "RT Dunn Fields"
- Former names: Fans Field (1902-1939) (Bloomington Baseball Park)
- Location: 109 E Lafayette St, Bloomington, IL 61701
- Coordinates: 40.462932°N 88.991484°W
- Owner: City of Bloomington Parks and Recreation
- Operator: City of Bloomington Parks and Recreation
- Capacity: 2875 (1921)
- Surface: Grass
- Field size: 319-398-353

Construction
- Built: 1901
- Opened: 1902
- Renovated: 1921, 1935
- Expanded: 1921, 1935
- Demolished: 1947

Tenants
- Illinois-Indiana-Iowa League; Bloomington Bloomers (1938-1939, 1935, 1919-1929, 1903-1917); Bloomington Bengals (1937); Bloomington Cubs (1930-1931); Bloomington Blues (1902)

Fans Field

Fans Field was a minor league baseball park in Bloomington, Illinois, and was home to the Bloomington franchise of the Illinois–Indiana–Iowa League, popularly known as the Three-I League or jokingly as the Three-Eye League, from the early 1900s through 1939. The team had various names, but was primarily known as the Bloomington Bloomers, as well as the Bloomington Blues, Bloomington Bengals, Bloomington Cubs and Bloomington Cardinals. It was a short block east of South Main Street, on the south side of Lafayette. The diamond was in the northwest corner of the property, with Lafayette paralleling the third base line. The ballpark was perhaps not coincidentally near the Brewery that sat just west of South Main and served the city's significant German population well. One of that Brewery's buildings was later used for a clubhouse at the Highland Park golf course. As for the ballpark, after the end of minor league ball in the city, the stands were converted for use as a fairgrounds, and later a ballroom was built on the site.

== Teams that played at Fans Field ==
Minor league teams that played at Fans field were independent for the most part, but fans field did see some minor league teams that were affiliated with Major League Baseball teams. The 1935 Bloomington Cardinals were affiliated with the St. Louis Cardinals, the 1938 Bloomington Bloomers were affiliated with the Cleveland Indians and the 1939 Bloomers were affiliated with the Chicago Cubs. Fans field hosted four league championship teams. League champion teams included the 1903, 1919, and 1920 Bloomers and the 1935 Bloomington Cardinals.

The name "Fans Field" first appeared in local newspapers in 1919. Prior to that, the ballpark was known as "South Side Park". The first game was played on May 2, 1902, and Bloomington defeated Cedar Rapids 2-1 in 10 innings. The ball club had previously played on the Fair Grounds.[Bloomington Pantagraph, May 3, 1902, p. 6]

The final Bloomers Three-Eye League game at Fans Field was played on August 28, 1939, won by the Decatur Commodores 3-1.[Bloomington Pantagraph, August 29, 1939, p. 8]

== The site today ==
Today, the site is home to the RT Dunn Fields at 109 E. Lafayette. The site remains adjacent to the National Guard Armory, has five acres with two lighted ball fields and is also utilized for football and soccer.
