= Dayton Aviators =

Minor league baseball team in Ohio

- 1928–1930; Dayton, Ohio

Minor league affiliations
- Class: Class B (1928–1930)
- League: Central League (1928–1930)

Major league affiliations
- Team: None

Minor league titles
- League titles (1): 1928

Team data
- Name: Dayton Aviators (1928–1930)
- Ballpark: North Side Park (1928–1930)

The Dayton Aviators were a minor league baseball team based in Dayton, Ohio. From 1928 to 1930, the Aviators played as members of the Class B level Central League, winning the 1928 league championship. The Aviators hosted home games at North Side Park.

Baseball Hall of Fame member Billy Herman played for the 1929 Dayton Aviators.

== History ==
The Aviators were preceded in minor league play by the Dayton Veterans who had played from 1903 to 1917, as members of a previous version of the Class B level Central League.

In 1928, the Dayton "Aviators" resumed minor league play, as the team became members of the six-team, Class B level Central League. The Akron Tyrites, Canton Terriers, Erie Sailors, Fort Wayne Chiefs and Springfield Buckeyes teams joined Dayton in beginning Central League play on April 25, 1928.

The Dayton "Aviators" nickname corresponds to Dayton aviation and history. Since 1923, Dayton has been home to the National Museum of the United States Air Force, located on the Wright-Patterson Air Force Base. Today, Dayton is also home to the Wright Brothers National Museum.

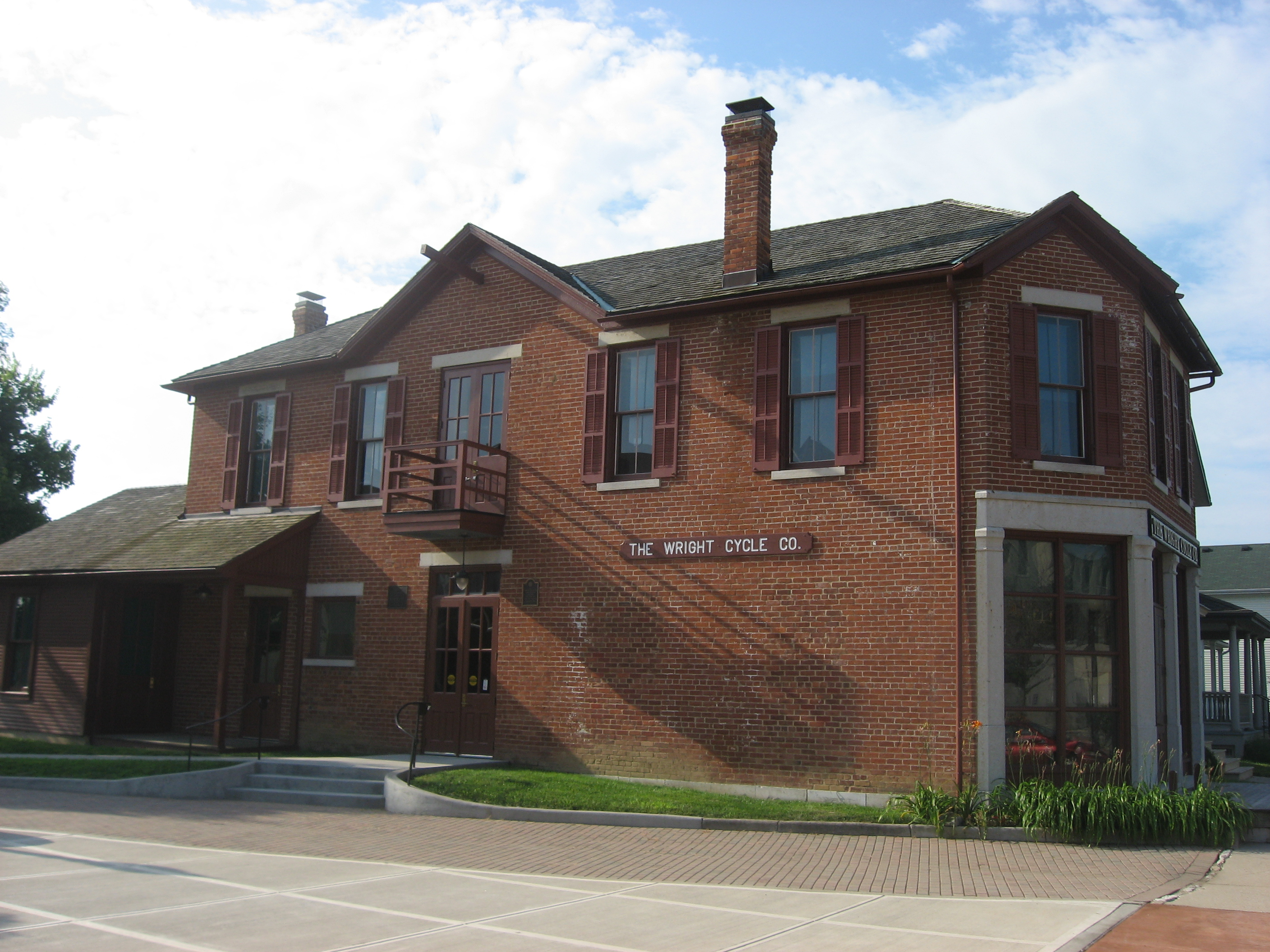
(2010) Wright Cycle Company Offices. National Register of Historic Places. Dayton, Ohio.

In their first season of play, the Aviators placed second in the Central League overall standings. With a record of 76–59, Dayton finished 1.0 game behind the first place Erie Sailors (76–57) in the final regular season standings. Erie won the second half of the split-season schedule, and the Fort Wayne Chiefs won the first half standings, with Fort Wayne eventually winning the playoff championship over Erie. Jimmy Jordan of the Aviators led the Central League with a .362 batting average and 27 home runs. Teammate Ed Clough had 130 strikeouts to lead the league pitchers.

The Aviators continued play in the 1929 Central League, placing third in the final standings of the six-team league. The Dayton Aviators had an overall record of 68-69 and finished 11.5 games behind the first place Canton Terries in the final standings, as the league held no playoffs. The Aviators were managed by Merito Acosta during the season.

Baseball Hall of Fame member Billy Herman played for the Aviators in 1929. At age 19, in his second professional season, Herman hit .329 for the Aviators in 138 games.

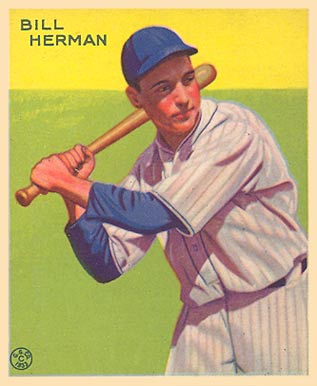
1933 Goudey baseball card. Billy Herman.

The Dayton Aviators played their final season in the 1930 Central League and finished last in the standings. Playing under manager Nick Cullup, the Aviators placed sixth in the six-team league. With a record of 56-81, Dayton finished 26.0 games behind the first place Springfield Blue Sox. Clyde Hatter of Dayton led Central League pitchers with 217 strikeouts.

The Central League did not return to play in 1931. The Aviators were succeeded in minor league play by the 1932 Dayton Ducks, who were formed when the Central League resumed play. The Ducks continued play in the Middle Atlantic League in 1933.

Today, the Dayton Dragons continue minor league play as members of the Class A level Midwest League.

== The ballpark ==
The Dayton Aviators teams hosted minor league home games at North Side Park. The ballpark had a capacity of 4,000. The ballpark had dimensions of (Left, Center, Right) of: 370, 420, 285 with a high Right Field fence. The ballpark was located northwest of Leo Street & Troy Pike Street. The ballpark site was located behind the location of the Philips Swimming Club, first built in 1901. Philips was once operated by the family of Baseball Hall of Fame member Mike Schmidt, a Dayton native. Schmidt's parents Joseph Jack Schmidt and Lois Jane Philipps managed the Philipps Aquatic Club, which had been founded by Lois's great-grandfather Charles A. Philipps. Schmidt worked as a lifeguard at the club and trained there as a competitive swimmer. The club remained in the family until it was sold and closed in 2009.

== Timeline ==
Year(s)	# Yrs.	Team	Level	League	Ballpark
1928-1930	3	Dayton Aviators	Class B	Central League	North Side Park

== Year-by-year records ==
Year	Record	Finish	Manager	Playoffs / Notes
1928	76–59	2nd	Everett Booe	Did not qualify
1929	68–69	3rd	Merito Acosta	No playoffs held
1930	56–81	6th	Nick Cullup	No playoffs held

== Notable alumni ==
- Billy Herman (1929), Inducted Baseball Hall of Fame, 1975
- Merito Acosta (1929, MGR)
- Everett Booe (1928, MGR)
- Tony Brottem (1929)
- Earl Browne (1929-1930)
- Ed Clough (1928)
- Nick Cullup (1930, MGR)
- Ray Cunningham (1928)
- Wayland Dean (1928)
- Marv Gudat (1928)
- Clyde Hatter (1930)
- Snipe Hansen (1929)
- Jimmy Jordan (1928)
- Johnny Marcum (1929-1930)
- Gil Paulsen (1928)
- Mike Ryba (1928)
- Bobby Schang (1928)
- Dutch Ussat (1929)
- Ab Wright (1928)

== See also ==
Dayton Aviators players
