= Bloomington Bloomers =

- 1888–1939; (1937-1939, 1935, 1919-1931, 1912-1917, 1899–1910, 1895, 1888-1889); Bloomington, Illinois

Minor league affiliations
- Previous classes: Class B (1937-1939, 1935, 1919-1931, 1912-1917, 1902–1910); Class D (1901)
- Previous leagues: Illinois–Indiana–Iowa League (1937-1939, 1935, 1919-1931, 1912-1917, 1901–1910); Central League (1900); Western Association (1899); Western Interstate League (1895); Indiana-Illinois League (1889); Central Interstate League (1888)

Major league affiliations
- Previous teams: Chicago Cubs (1939); Cleveland Indians (1938); St. Louis Cardinals (1935)

Minor league titles
- League titles: 4 (1903, 1919-1920, 1935)

Team data
- Previous names: Bloomington Bloomers (1938-1939, 1935, 1919-1929, 1903-1917); Bloomington Bengals (1937); Bloomington Cubs (1930-1931); Bloomington Blues (1899-1902); Bloomington Reds (1888-1889)
- Previous parks: Fans Field (1901-1939)

The Bloomington Bloomers were a minor League baseball franchise based in Bloomington, Illinois that played between 1889 and 1939. They were affiliates of the St. Louis Cardinals (1935), Cleveland Indians (1938) and Chicago Cubs (1939). They played primarily in the Illinois-Iowa-Indiana League during their existence. Their home park was Fans Field. Baseball Hall of Fame Inductees Burleigh Grimes and Clark Griffith played for Bloomington.

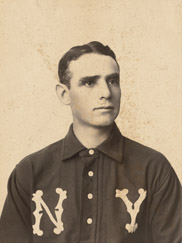
Clark Griffith, 1903. Major League Baseball pitcher (1891 - 1914), manager (1901 - 1920) and team owner (1920 - 1955). Hall of Fame

== League championships ==
In 1903, the Bloomers won their first Illinois–Indiana–Iowa League championship, playing the season under manager William Connors. The Bloomers won back-to-back lIllinois–Indiana–Iowa League championships in 1919 and 1920 under leadership of manager Joe Dunn in both championship seasons. Their final league championship came in 1935, when the Bloomers won the Illinois–Indiana–Iowa League title, playing the season under manager and Baseball Hall of Fame member Burleigh Grimes.

== The ballpark ==
In the seasons of play between 1901 through 1939, Bloomington hosted minor league games at Fans Field in Bloomington. The ballpark was located at 109 East Lafayette Street in Bloomington, Illinois. Today, the site is still in use as a public park with baseball fields and is part of the City of Bloomington Park and Recreation system. Today, the baseball park is known as RT Dunn Fields.

== Notable alumni ==
- Clark Griffith (1888) Inducted Baseball Hall of Fame, 1946
- Burleigh Grimes (1935, MGR) Inducted Baseball Hall of Fame, 1964
- Hal Peck (1939)
- Johnny Schmitz (1939) 2x MLB All-Star
- Jack Hallett (1938)
- Blix Donnelly (1937)
- Xavier Rescigno (1937)
- Bill Cox (1935)
- Howie Krist (1935)
- Max Macon (1935)
- Hersh Martin (1935) MLB All-Star
- Howard Maple (1930–1931)
- Hy Vandenberg (1930–1931)
- Bruce Campbell (baseball) (1930)
- Jack Tobin (1930)
- Tommy Thompson (1929)
- Boom-Boom Beck (1925)
- Phil Collins (1924)
- Mack Allison (1922)
- Bob Fothergill (1920)
- Paul Zahniser (1920)
- Butch Henline (1919)
- Heinie Sand (1919)
- Don Marion (1916–1917)
- Elam Vangilder (1917)
- Jim Bluejacket (1912–1914, 1916)
- Ray Schmandt (1915–16)
- Harry Bay (1912) 2× AL Stolen Base Leader (1903, 1904)
- Les Nunamaker (1910)
- George Cutshaw (1908–1909)
- Bill Steen (1909)
- Art Wilson (1906–1908)
- George Moriarty (1902)
- George Keefe (1900)
- Pop Dillon (1895)
- Alfred Lawson (1889) Aviation Pioneer
- Joe Farrell (1888)
