= Ed Wheeler (1900s infielder) =

American baseball player (1878–1960)

- Infielder
- Born: June 15, 1878; Sherman, Michigan, U.S.
- Died: August 15, 1960 (aged 82); Ft. Worth, Texas, U.S.
- Batted: Switch Threw: Right

MLB debut
- May 10, 1902, for the Brooklyn Superbas

Last MLB appearance
- September 30, 1902, for the Brooklyn Superbas

MLB statistics
- Batting average: .125
- Home runs: 0
- Runs batted in: 5
- Stats at Baseball Reference

Teams
- Brooklyn Superbas (1902)

Edward Leroy Wheeler (June 15, 1878 – August 15, 1960) was an American professional baseball player who was a utility player for the Brooklyn Superbas during the 1902 season. He played 11 games at third base, 10 games at second base and 5 games at short stop for the Superbas that season.
