= Grand Rapids (baseball) =

- 1883–1951; (1883–1884, 1889–1891, 1894–1917, 1920–1924, 1926, 1934, 1940–1941, 1948–1951); Grand Rapids, Michigan

Minor league affiliations
- Previous classes: Class A (1948–1951); Class C (1940–1941); Class B (1903–1934); Class D (1902); Class A (1899, 1901); Class B (1898–1899); Class A (1895–1897)
- League: Central League (1948–1951)
- Previous leagues: Michigan State League (1940–1941); Central League (1934); Michigan State League (1926); Michigan–Ontario League (1923–1924); Central League (1903–1917, 1920–1922); Michigan State League (1902); Western League (1901); Western Association (1901); International League (1900); Western League (1899); Interstate League (1898–1899); Western League (1894–1897); Northwestern League (1891); International Association (1890); Michigan State League (1889–1890); Northwestern League (1883–1884)

Major league affiliations
- Previous teams: Chicago Cubs (1950–1951); Brooklyn Dodgers (1940–1941); Detroit Tigers (1939)

Team data
- Previous names: Grand Rapids Jets (1948–1950); Grand Rapids Colts (1941); Grand Rapids Dodgers (1940); Grand Rapids Tigers (1934); Grand Rapids Black Sox (1912, 1915–1917, 1926); Grand Rapids Homoners (1924); Grand Rapids Billbobs (1922–1923); Grand Rapids Joshers (1920–1921); Grand Rapids Champs (1914); Grand Rapids Bill-eds (1913); Grand Rapids Grads (1912); Grand Rapids Furniture Makers (1901, 1911); Grand Rapids Raiders (1910); Grand Rapids Wolverines (1906–1909); Grand Rapids Orphans (1903–1905); Grand Rapids Colts (1902); Grand Rapids Prodigals [Western/American League] (1899); Grand Rapids Furnituremakers [Interstate League] (1898–1899); Grand Rapids Bob-o-links (1897); Grand Rapids Gold Bugs (1895–1896); Grand Rapids Rustlers (1894); Grand Rapids Shamrocks (1890–1891); Grand Rapids Baseball Club (1883–1884, 1889–1890, 1901)
- Previous parks: Recreation Park (Grand Rapids, Michigan), Alger Park, Bigelow Field

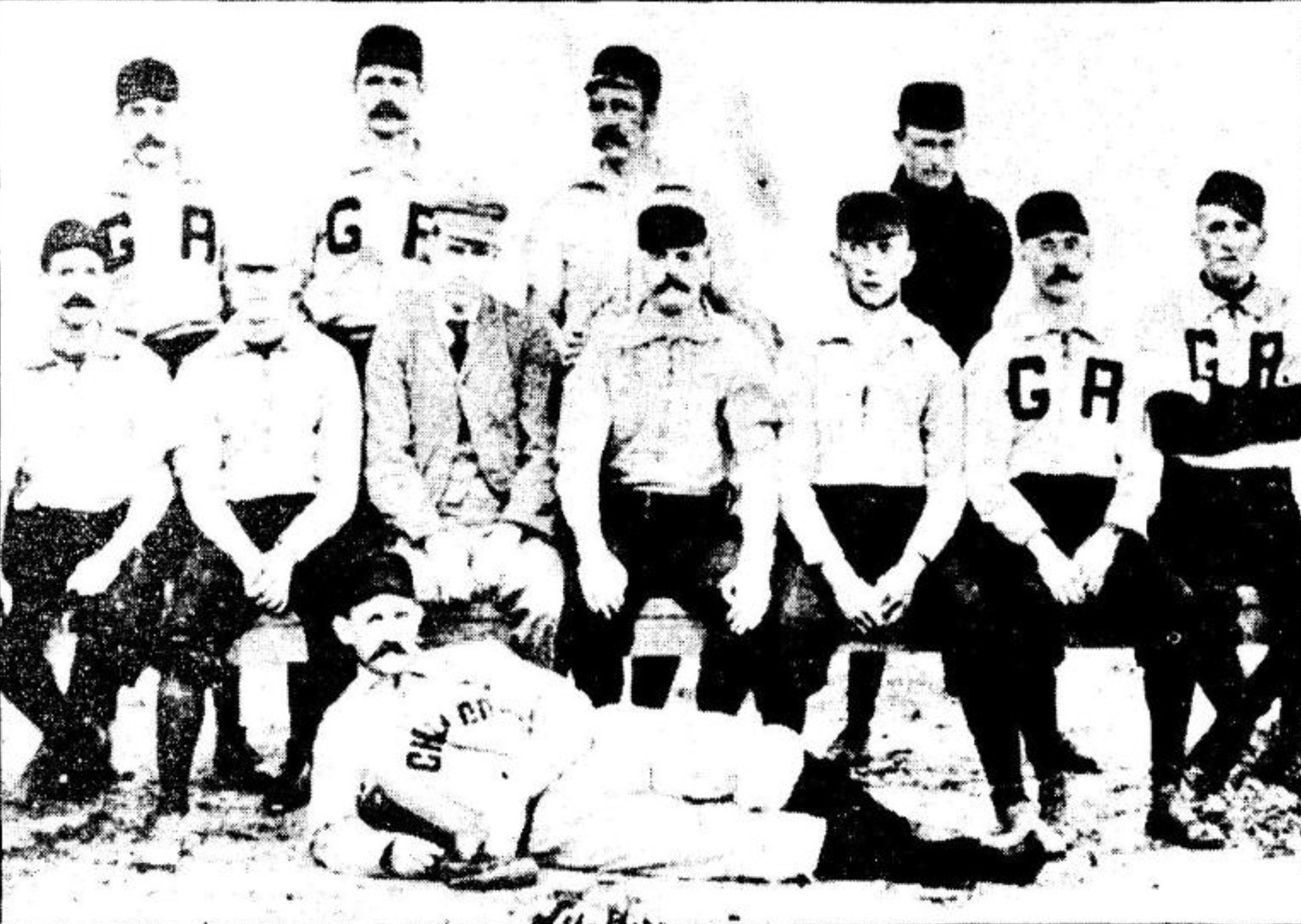
1894 Grand Rapids baseball team

The Grand Rapids Baseball Club was a minor league baseball team based in Grand Rapids, Michigan that played under several different names at various times between 1883 and 1951.

== An ancestor to two Major League franchises ==
From 1894 to 1897, Grand Rapids played in the Western League, a minor league precursor to what is now the American League of Major League Baseball and played in Recreation Park (Grand Rapids, Michigan). Despite being a founding member of the newly reorganized Western League under Ban Johnson, Grand Rapids was only allowed annual, rather than a five-year, franchise renewal rights. This lack of permanency, as well as the city's refusal to allow professional games to be played in the city limits on Sundays – traditionally the day for the largest crowds by far – were contributing factors in the failure to upgrade Recreation Park, their home grounds. While the ballpark was adequate at the time of its hasty construction by 1894 standard, the park quickly fell behind the times as newer, larger parks such as Detroit's Bennett Park (Detroit) (in 1896) were being completed.

As with many franchises of this era, mascots were unofficial, and seldom chosen by the team itself, but applied by a preponderance of public sources such as local media. Generally, the 1894 team was known as "Rasty's Rustlers" – named for their first of three captains that season, Rasty Wright (outfielder) and a Western-themed name. Ellis rechristened the team himself the "Goldbugs" and outfitted his team with yellow shirts and black trim. This was a contemporaneous moniker for supporters of the gold standard, bi-mentalism being a major issue at that time. In 1897, the team was purchased by Robert Leadley and Bob Glenalvin and named the Bob-o-links. Modern sources occasionally state the name "Rippers" had been applied to the Western League team, but this is no evidence of this by any of the three daily newspapers in Grand Rapids at the time, or by any national source such as the Sporting Life.

During the 1897 campaign, the team ignobly finished with 100 losses against a mere 34 wins and suffered immensely under Leadley's fiscal maleficence, which caused him to forfeit the Grand Rapids franchise less than a year after Ellis had secured a five-season deal with the Western League. Poor team and business management, the lack of improvements, the poor level of team play with basement finishes in the previous three seasons – all conditions rendering the city's slight comparative size a likely though unnecessary factor – caused Johnson to remove the team to Omaha, Nebraska after the 1897 season.

Following the departure from Grand Rapids, the team fared even worse with attendance, not being able to last a full season in Nebraska. They moved to St. Joseph, Missouri to finish the 1898 season, and moved to Buffalo, New York in 1899. The Grand Rapids-Omaha-St. Joseph-Buffalo franchise, from 1895 to 1899, finished in last place every season, and finished second to last in Buffalo in 1900, never being able to reach attendance levels previously known in the Furniture City. By this time, the former minor Western League had become the American League and was pursuing major league status. In keeping with Ban Johnson's strategy of direct competition and playing American League teams in National League (baseball) towns, the Buffalo team was moved – by direct transfer or by vacation, depending upon historiological perspective – to Boston, Massachusetts and eventually became known as the Boston Red Sox.

In July 1899, the Columbus, Ohio franchise of the Western League, run by team president Tom Loftus and managed/captained on the field by first baseball George Tebeau, moved to Grand Rapids after a three and a half years of financial losses due to lack of fan support. At the same time, the Interstate League team known as the Grand Rapids (or Torreyson's) Furniture Makers, filling the void of the Western League's departure, moved to Columbus when Grand Rapids fans were less enthused over the lower standards of Interstate League play. Grand Rapids' second iteration as a Western League city began on July 20, 1899, and the team routinely played to overflow crowds in what was admittedly a smaller than average Recreation Park. As an obvious celebration of the return of the superior Western League – soon to be renamed the American League and declared a major league – the 1899 Grand Rapids team was rechristened the Prodigals and contained future Hall of Famers Sam Crawford and Rube Waddell, in addition to a roster which 13 out of 16 Prodigals had, or were soon to have, major league experience – the three that did not were late-in-season bring-ups tried out. Some of the more prominent members of the club included Billy Sullivan (1900s catcher), Bumpus Jones, and Ollie Pickering, Willie McGill, and Louis Bierbauer.

Despite Grand Rapids strong fan support and first division placement – the city's only top half finish in Western League play – Tom Loftus accepted a job managing the Chicago Cubs for the 1900 season, compelling him to divest of his interests in the Grand Rapids franchise. The poor condition of Recreation Park, its property owner renewing his refusal to allow Sunday baseball there – forcing the team to play outside the city limits on its most lucrative day of the week – presented local complications difficult to surmount. Meanwhile, at the league level, with the inevitable sale of the club by Loftus – the only manager with proven experience at making big(ger) league ball work in Grand Rapids – there appears to be no serious consideration by Johnson to keep one of only eight American League franchises there, especially when his league's budding competition with the National League had him eyeing franchise placements in Chicago, Cleveland, and New York. In February 1900, months after the Western League's rechristening, Grand Rapids ultimately lost its American League franchise when its transfer was finalized to Cleveland, where it plays to this day as the major league Cleveland Guardians. (See also History of the Cleveland Guardians)

== Firmly established a minor league city ==
Later Grand Rapids teams played mostly in the Central League but also in various other Michigan-based leagues. After a long minor league hiatus in Grand Rapids, the West Michigan Whitecaps of the Midwest League began play in Comstock Park, Michigan, just outside Grand Rapids, in 1994.

== The ballparks ==
Prior to Western League play in 1894, the various Grand Rapids professional teams played at a variety of parks intended more for convenience than for permanence.

Professional, organized baseball was first played in Grand Rapids at the Kent County Fairgrounds in 1883 at the present-day intersection of Hall and Jefferson Avenue, where the Gerald R. Ford Job Corps (formerly South High School) is located. Fountain Street Park, located at today's Midtown Green at Fountain and Eastern streets, briefly replaced the Fairgrounds when these were moved out of the city.

From 1889 through the 1930s, baseball parks at Reed's Lake in East Grand Rapids were used. Two stadia, Alger Park, and later Ramona Park, served as home fields for Grand Rapids professional baseball near where the current Memorial Park East Grand Rapids High School football stadium is located. First used in 1889 as an all-week home grounds, these proved inconveniently located almost four miles from downtown Grand Rapids at a time when electric streetcar – inexpensive but very slow – was the likely mode of transportation. When the proto-Major Western League came to Grand Rapids, first Alger and later Ramona Park was used as primarily as a Sunday park which allowed play – for a permit fee – when contests ran more sternly afoul of Blue Laws forbidding Sabbath play within the city limits. All week baseball would return to Reed's Lake by the 1920s when more prevalent automobile usage made games there far less of an inconvenience.

The stands for Recreation Park (Grand Rapids, Michigan) were built in the early Spring of 1894 over a five-week period at a cost of $1,500. It was located conveniently on the South Division electric streetcar line, behind the site of the present-day Cottage Grove Silver Line Rapid station. Limited thought went into its design. The grandstand was located on the west side of the field, meaning defenses faced the sun. It was built 400 feet off of Division Avenue amid an array of lumber yards and sawmills, which likely made construction of the wooden park easy, but contributed to dirt and sawdust chocking the playing field glass, which was splotchy and a dingy yellowish color. It was a common complaint that fans walking to the games from the streetcar line frequent did so through sand and sawdust. Nonetheless, it was the city's first intended permanent home of professional baseball in advance of the arrival of the much-heralded Western League and the effort was headed by team president and future Grand Rapids mayor George "Deacon" Ellis.

Prior to 1898, teams played at Recreation Park for non-Sunday games and at Alger Park on Reeds Lake on Sundays. Playing professional baseball games on Sundays within the city limits was a frequently recurring controversy and a stumbling block tripping up improvements of the grounds until the laws were relaxed in time for the 1899 season – the final year of its use as an athletic facility. The stands and fences were taken down following the 1899 high school football season, and what wood had not by this time rotted was removed to Reed's Lake.

Island Park, near the downtown Grand Rapids' site of the new amphitheater, was a premiere home for professional baseball completed in 1912. When World War One preempted minor league baseball, the stadium fell into disuse. When the minors began play in earnest again, teams split usage of the downtown and Reed's Lake locations, until the Great Depression killed much of professional ball in the city. With Island Park's last usage in the 1920s, organized professional baseball left the city limits of Grand Rapids.

From 1940 until the end of the AAGPBL, professional teams played at Bigelow Field on South Division Avenue and 39th Street. A McDonald's restaurant occupies a portion of the site today.

== Notable alumni ==
=== Baseball Hall of Fame alumni ===
- Rube Waddell (1899) Inducted, 1946
- Sam Crawford (1899) Inducted, 1957
- Burleigh Grimes (1940, MGR) Inducted, 1964

=== Notable alumni ===
- Nick Altrock (1899)
- Louis Bierbauer (1899)
- Theodore Breitenstein (1891) ERA Leader
- Dick Buckley (baseball) (1899)
- Hal Carlson (1915)
- Bud Clancy (1923)
- Josh Devore (1920–1921, 1923–1924)
- Red Donahue (1895)
- Red Dooin (1899)
- Pat Duncan (1916)
- Pretzels Getzien (1883–1884)
- Charlie Hemphill (1899)
- Joe Heving (1924)
- Dave Hoskins (1948)
- Bert Humphries (1909)
- Bumpus Jones (1894–1895, 1899)
- Frank Killen (1901)
- Bobby Lowe (1908)
- Willie McGill (1899)
- Jeff Pfeffer (1913)
- George Pinkney (1894)
- Dusty Rhodes (1950)
- Lance Richbourg (1920)
- Milt Shoffner (1926)
- Sherry Smith (1913)
- Billy Sullivan (1900s catcher) (1899)
- Ed Summers (1906)
- Lee Tannehill (1917)
- Jack Taylor (1909) ERA Leader
- George Tebeau (1899 captain/1B)
- Maurice Van Robays (1934)
- Stan Wasiak (1941)
- Al Wickland (1911)
