= 1938 Boston Bees season =

1938 Boston Bees
- League: National League
- Ballpark: The Bee Hive
- City: Boston, Massachusetts
- Record: 77–75 (.507)
- League place: 5th
- Owners: J.A. Robert Quinn
- Managers: Casey Stengel
- Radio: WAAB (Fred Hoey)

The 1938 Boston Bees season was the 68th season of the franchise.

== Offseason ==
On January 8, 1938, Bob Smith was released by the Boston Bees. On February 16, 1938, Tommy Thevenow was released by the Bees.

== Regular season ==
On June 11, 1938, Johnny Vander Meer of the Cincinnati Reds threw a no-hitter against the Bees. It would be the first of two consecutive no-hitters that Vander Meer pitched.

=== Season standings ===
National League
Team	W	L	Pct.	GB	Home	Road
Chicago Cubs	89	63	.586	—	44‍–‍33	45‍–‍30
Pittsburgh Pirates	86	64	.573	2	44‍–‍33	42‍–‍31
New York Giants	83	67	.553	5	43‍–‍30	40‍–‍37
Cincinnati Reds	82	68	.547	6	43‍–‍34	39‍–‍34
Boston Bees	77	75	.507	12	45‍–‍30	32‍–‍45
St. Louis Cardinals	71	80	.470	17½	36‍–‍41	35‍–‍39
Brooklyn Dodgers	69	80	.463	18½	31‍–‍41	38‍–‍39
Philadelphia Phillies	45	105	.300	43	26‍–‍48	19‍–‍57

=== Record vs. opponents ===
1938 National League record Sources:
Team	BSN	BRO	CHC	CIN	NYG	PHI	PIT	STL
Boston	—	10–12	12–10	11–9	8–14	14–8	9–13	13–9–1
Brooklyn	10–12	—	9–11–1	9–13	8–14	15–7	9–11	9–12–1
Chicago	12–10	11–9–1	—	11–11	12–10	18–4	12–10	13–9–1
Cincinnati	9–11	13–9	11–11	—	12–9	14–7	10–12	13–9–1
New York	14–8	14–8	10–12	9–12	—	16–5	9–13–1	11–9–1
Philadelphia	8–14	7–15	4–18	7–14	5–16	—	8–12–1	6–16
Pittsburgh	13–9	11–9	10–12	12–10	13–9–1	12–8–1	—	15–7
St. Louis	9–13–1	12–9–1	9–13–1	9–13–1	9–11–1	16–6	7–15	—

=== Notable transactions ===
- September 10, 1938: Oliver Hill was purchased by the Bees from the Atlanta Crackers.

=== Roster ===
1938 Boston Bees
Roster
Pitchers: 21 Mike Balas; 30 Art Doll; 27 Tom Earley; 18 Dick Errickson; 16 Lou Fette; 19 Frank Gabler; 20 Ira Hutchinson; 11 Art Kenney; 17 Johnny Lanning; 14 Danny MacFayden; 26 Hiker Moran; 18 Johnny Niggeling; 24 Bobby Reis; 25 Tommy Reis; 15 Milt Shoffner; 23 Jim Turner; 11 Roy Weir	Catchers: 7 Al López; 10 Ray Mueller; 19 Johnny Riddle; 10,25 Butch Sutcliffe; Infielders: 3 Tony Cuccinello; 2 Gil English; 5 Elbie Fletcher; 29 Jim Hitchcock; 29 Tom Kane; 29 Eddie Mayo; 11 Joe Stripp; 29 Joe Walsh; 8 Rabbit Warstler	Outfielders: 34 Johnny Cooney; 6 Vince DiMaggio; 9 Debs Garms; 12 Roy Johnson; 21 Harl Maggert; 12 Ralph McLeod; 1 Gene Moore; 4 Max West; Other batters: 22,29 Bob Kahle	Manager: 31 Casey Stengel; Coaches: 32 George Kelly; 33 Mike Kelly

== Player stats ==
=== Batting ===
==== Starters by position ====
Note: Pos = Position; G = Games played; AB = At bats; H = Hits; Avg. = Batting average; HR = Home runs; RBI = Runs batted in

Pos	Player	G	AB	H	Avg.	HR	RBI
C	Ray Mueller	83	274	65	.237	4	35
1B	Elbie Fletcher	147	529	144	.272	6	48
2B	Tony Cuccinello	147	555	147	.265	9	76
SS	Rabbit Warstler	142	467	108	.231	0	40
3B	Joe Stripp	59	229	63	.275	1	19
OF	Vince DiMaggio	150	540	123	.228	14	61
OF	Johnny Cooney	120	432	117	.271	0	17
OF	Max West	123	418	98	.234	10	63

==== Other batters ====
Note: G = Games played; AB = At bats; H = Hits; Avg. = Batting average; HR = Home runs; RBI = Runs batted in

Player	G	AB	H	Avg.	HR	RBI
Debs Garms	117	428	135	.315	0	47
Al López	71	236	63	.267	1	14
Gene Moore	54	180	49	.272	3	19
Gil English	53	165	41	.248	2	21
Harl Maggert	66	89	25	.281	3	19
Jimmy Hitchcock	28	76	13	.171	0	7
Johnny Riddle	19	57	16	.281	0	2
Bobby Reis	34	49	9	.184	0	4
Roy Johnson	7	29	5	.172	0	1
Eddie Mayo	8	14	3	.214	1	4
Joe Walsh	4	8	0	.000	0	0
Ralph McLeod	6	7	2	.286	0	0
Butch Sutcliffe	4	4	1	.250	0	2
Bob Kahle	8	3	1	.333	0	0
Tom Kane	2	2	0	.000	0	0

=== Pitching ===
==== Starting pitchers ====
Note: G = Games pitched; IP = Innings pitched; W = Wins; L = Losses; ERA = Earned run average; SO = Strikeouts

Player	G	IP	W	L	ERA	SO
Jim Turner	35	268.0	14	18	3.46	71
Lou Fette	33	239.2	11	13	3.15	83
Danny MacFayden	29	219.2	14	9	2.95	58

==== Other pitchers ====
Note: G = Games pitched; IP = Innings pitched; W = Wins; L = Losses; ERA = Earned run average; SO = Strikeouts

Player	G	IP	W	L	ERA	SO
Ira Hutchinson	36	151.0	9	8	2.74	38
Milt Shoffner	26	139.2	8	7	3.54	49
Johnny Lanning	32	138.0	8	7	3.72	39
Dick Errickson	34	122.2	9	7	3.15	40
Tom Earley	2	11.0	1	0	3.27	4

==== Relief pitchers ====
Note: G = Games pitched; W = Wins; L = Losses; SV = Saves; ERA = Earned run average; SO = Strikeouts

Player	G	W	L	SV	ERA	SO
Bobby Reis	16	1	6	0	4.99	20
Roy Weir	5	1	0	0	6.75	3
Tommy Reis	4	0	0	0	7.11	4
Art Doll	3	0	0	0	2.25	1
Art Kenney	2	0	0	0	15.43	2
Johnny Niggeling	2	1	0	0	9.00	1
Hiker Moran	1	0	0	0	0.00	0
Mike Balas	1	0	0	0	6.75	0
Frank Gabler	1	0	0	0	81.00	0

== Farm system ==
Level	Team	League	Manager
A	Hartford Bees	Eastern League	Eddie Onslow
B	Evansville Bees	Illinois–Indiana–Iowa League	Bob Coleman
C	Erie Sailors	Middle Atlantic League	Jocko Munch
D	Huntington Bees	Mountain State League	Dickey Kerr
D	Salisbury Bees	North Carolina State League	Blackie Carter
