= 1959 in baseball =

The following are the baseball events of the year 1959 throughout the world.

== Champions ==
=== Major League Baseball ===
- World Series: Los Angeles Dodgers over Chicago White Sox (4–2); Larry Sherry, MVP
- All-Star Game (#1), July 7 at Forbes Field: National League, 5–4
- All-Star Game (#2), August 3 at Los Angeles Memorial Coliseum: American League, 5–3

=== Other champions ===
- College World Series: Oklahoma State
- Japan Series: Nankai Hawks over Yomiuri Giants (4–0)
- Little League World Series: Hamtramck National, Hamtramck, Michigan
- Pan American Games: Venezuela over Puerto Rico

Winter Leagues

- 1959 Caribbean Series: Alacranes de Almendares
- Cuban League: Alacranes de Almendares
- Dominican Republic League: Tigres del Licey
- Mexican Pacific League: Ostioneros de Guaymas
- Panamanian League: Coclé BBC
- Puerto Rican League: Cangrejeros de Santurce
- Venezuelan League: Indios de Oriente

== Awards and honors ==
- Baseball Hall of Fame
  - Zack Wheat

Baseball Writers' Association of America Awards
BBWAA Award	National League	American League
Rookie of the Year	Willie McCovey (SF)	Bob Allison (WSH)
Cy Young Award	—	Early Wynn (CWS)
Most Valuable Player	Ernie Banks (CHC)	Nellie Fox (CWS)
Gold Glove Awards
Position	National League	American League
Pitcher	Harvey Haddix (PIT)	Bobby Shantz (NYY)
Catcher	Del Crandall (MIL)	Sherm Lollar (CWS)
1st Base	Gil Hodges (LAD)	Vic Power (CLE)
2nd Base	Charlie Neal (LAD)	Nellie Fox (CWS)
3rd Base	Ken Boyer (STL)	Frank Malzone (BOS)
Shortstop	Roy McMillan (CIN)	Luis Aparicio (CWS)
Left field	Jackie Brandt (SF)	Minnie Miñoso (CLE)
Center field	Willie Mays (SF)	Al Kaline (DET)
Right field	Hank Aaron (MIL)	Jackie Jensen (BOS)

== Statistical leaders ==
	American League		National League	
Stat	Player	Total	Player	Total
AVG	Harvey Kuenn (DET)	.353	Hank Aaron (MIL)	.355
HR	Rocky Colavito (CLE); Harmon Killebrew (WSH)	42	Eddie Mathews (MIL)	46
RBI	Jackie Jensen (BOS)	112	Ernie Banks (CHC)	143
W	Early Wynn (CWS)	22	Lew Burdette (MIL); Sam Jones (SF); Warren Spahn (MIL)	21
ERA	Hoyt Wilhelm (BAL)	2.19	Sam Jones (SF)	2.83
K	Jim Bunning (DET)	201	Don Drysdale (LAD)	242

== Major league baseball final standings ==
=== American League final standings ===
American League
Team	W	L	Pct.	GB	Home	Road
Chicago White Sox	94	60	.610	—	47‍–‍30	47‍–‍30
Cleveland Indians	89	65	.578	5	43‍–‍34	46‍–‍31
New York Yankees	79	75	.513	15	40‍–‍37	39‍–‍38
Detroit Tigers	76	78	.494	18	41‍–‍36	35‍–‍42
Boston Red Sox	75	79	.487	19	43‍–‍34	32‍–‍45
Baltimore Orioles	74	80	.481	20	38‍–‍39	36‍–‍41
Kansas City Athletics	66	88	.429	28	37‍–‍40	29‍–‍48
Washington Senators	63	91	.409	31	34‍–‍43	29‍–‍48

Locations of teams for the 1955–1960 American League seasons
American League

=== National League final standings ===
National League
Team	W	L	Pct.	GB	Home	Road
Los Angeles Dodgers	88	68	.564	—	46‍–‍32	42‍–‍36
Milwaukee Braves	86	70	.551	2	49‍–‍29	37‍–‍41
San Francisco Giants	83	71	.539	4	42‍–‍35	41‍–‍36
Pittsburgh Pirates	78	76	.506	9	47‍–‍30	31‍–‍46
Chicago Cubs	74	80	.481	13	38‍–‍39	36‍–‍41
Cincinnati Reds	74	80	.481	13	43‍–‍34	31‍–‍46
St. Louis Cardinals	71	83	.461	16	42‍–‍35	29‍–‍48
Philadelphia Phillies	64	90	.416	23	37‍–‍40	27‍–‍50

Locations of teams for the 1959 National League season
National League

== Nippon Professional Baseball final standings ==
=== Central League final standings ===
Central League	G	W	L	T	Pct.	GB
Yomiuri Giants	130	77	48	5	.612	—
Osaka Tigers	130	62	59	9	.512	13.0
Chunichi Dragons	130	64	61	5	.512	13.0
Kokutetsu Swallows	130	63	65	2	.492	15.5
Hiroshima Carp	130	59	64	7	.481	17.0
Taiyo Whales	130	49	77	4	.392	28.5

=== Pacific League final standings ===
Pacific League	G	W	L	T	Pct.	GB
Nankai Hawks	134	88	42	4	.677	—
Daimai Orions	136	82	48	6	.631	6.0
Toei Flyers	135	67	63	5	.515	21.0
Nishitetsu Lions	144	66	64	14	.508	22.0
Hankyu Braves	134	48	82	4	.369	40.0
Kintetsu Buffaloes	133	39	91	3	.300	49.0

== Events ==
=== January ===
- January 13:
  - The California Supreme Court unanimously validates the October 1957 transaction between the City of Los Angeles and Walter O'Malley that transfers ownership of 300 acres in Chavez Ravine to O'Malley in exchange for a minor-league baseball park in South Los Angeles. The decision reverses a lower court ruling against the transfer. O'Malley says he will break ground on what will become Dodger Stadium within 30 days.
  - John J. Quinn, 50, general manager of the defending National League champion Milwaukee Braves, resigns to become GM of the cellar-dwelling Philadelphia Phillies, replacing Roy Hamey. Quinn has headed the Braves' front office since 1945, when they played in Boston. Hamey rejoins the New York Yankees as assistant to GM George Weiss.
- January 14 – Baseball Hall of Fame former shortstop Joe Cronin, 52, is chosen to succeed Will Harridge, 75, to become the fourth president of the American League. Harridge, who had spent 28 years as the AL's chief executive, becomes board chairman. One day later, Hall of Fame field manager Bucky Harris, 62, is named to replace Cronin as general manager of the Boston Red Sox.
- January 25 – MLB front-office shuffles continue as John McHale, 37, general manager of the Detroit Tigers since April 1957, resigns to take a similar post with the Milwaukee Braves. Former catcher and future Hall-of-Famer Rick Ferrell takes over Detroit's GM job.
- January 30 – The Cincinnati Redlegs trade catcher Smoky Burgess, pitcher Harvey Haddix, and third baseman Don Hoak to the Pittsburgh Pirates in exchange for third baseman Frank Thomas, pitcher Whammy Douglas, outfielders Jim Pendleton and Johnny Powers, and cash considerations.

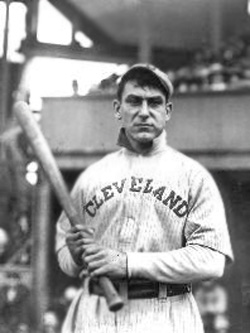
Nap Lajoie

=== February ===
- February 7 – Baseball mourns all-time great Nap Lajoie upon his death from pneumonia in Daytona Beach, Florida at 84. Second baseman Lajoie, the third man to exceed 3,000 career hits, was so famous that the Cleveland American League club was known as the "Naps" during his 1902–1914 tenure. He was elected to the Hall of Fame in 1937. (See Deaths entry for this date below.)
- February 11 – Although Cold War tensions remain high, Cincinnati's MLB franchise decides to return to its traditional identity, the Cincinnati Reds. The club had changed its official moniker to Cincinnati Redlegs in April 1953 to disassociate itself from Communism. Fans and media will intermittently refer to the team as the "Redlegs" into the early 1960s, however, and the word "Reds" will not return to the team's logo until a uniform makeover in 1961.
- February 14 – The San Francisco Giants sell the contract of Whitey Lockman to the Baltimore Orioles.
- February 15:
  - Cuba wins its fourth straight Caribbean Series, defeating second-place Venezuela, 8–2, behind Camilo Pascual. Represented by its league champions, Almendares, Cuba wins five of the six games they play. The MVP is future MLB All-Star Norm Cash, a member of Venezuela's representative.
  - An important upper-level minor league closes its doors forever when the Western League announces it will not operate in 1959. Since 1955, the Western circuit has lost markets like Denver, Omaha, Wichita and Amarillo to higher-classification loops. Four of its eight clubs stay afloat by joining the lower-classification Three–I League.
- February 28 – Mickey Mantle of the New York Yankees ends his holdout after one day. Mantle agrees to a salary of $72,000 and a bonus of $2,000. He had been asking the Yankees for $85,000 after batting .304 with 42 home runs and 97 RBI in 1958.

=== March ===
- March 10 – After five years out of the spotlight, Bill Veeck returns to baseball, purchasing 54 percent majority interest in the Chicago White Sox from Dorothy Comiskey Rigney. The transaction caps the long-running feud between Dorothy and her brother Chuck, who owns the remaining 46%. It also marks the end of the Comiskey family's nearly six-decade-long control of the Pale Hose franchise.
- March 21 – Larry Doby, future Hall of Famer and the first African-American to play in the American League, is traded by the Cleveland Indians to the Detroit Tigers in exchange for Tito Francona.

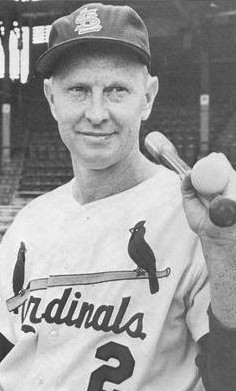
Red Schoendienst (1965)

- March 24 – Milwaukee Braves second baseman Red Schoendienst, hospitalized for four months with tuberculosis, is released from a St. Louis sanatorium and will continue his recovery at home. Schoendienst, 36, underwent lung surgery in February as part of his treatment. He was diagnosed with the ailment last November after he started all seven games of the 1958 World Series; playing in all 63 innings, he had batted .300 and made only one error in 38 total chances on defense.
- March 25 – In a trade that benefits both clubs, the St. Louis Cardinals obtain Bill White and Ray Jablonski from the San Francisco Giants for "Toothpick" Sam Jones and Don Choate. Veteran hurler Jones, 33, will lead the National League in games won (21), shutouts (four) and earned run average (2.83) in 1959. White, a 25-year-old first baseman who as a Giant was caught between incumbent Orlando Cepeda and prospect Willie McCovey — both future Hall of Famers — becomes a regular and team leader with the Cardinals, who is selected for eight All-Star Games, wins six Gold Glove Awards, and plays a critical role in the Redbirds' 1964 world-championship season and the racial integration of their spring training living quarters. After his playing days, White achieves further prominence as a broadcaster for the New York Yankees (1971–1988), then president of the National League (1989–1994).
- March 31 – The Philadelphia Phillies and Milwaukee Braves pull off a six-man trade, with the Phils exchanging catcher Stan Lopata and infielders Ted Kazanski and Johnny O'Brien for pitcher Gene Conley and infielders Harry Hanebrink and Joe Koppe.

=== April ===
- April 2 – As spring training draws to an end, the Detroit Tigers return minor-league shortstop Maury Wills to the Los Angeles Dodgers' organization. Wills, 26, had been acquired "conditionally" in October 1958. Assigned to Triple-A Spokane to begin 1959, Wills will become a switch-hitter, hit .313 in 48 games, then be promoted to the Dodgers and make his debut on June 6, 1959; by 1962 he will set a new MLB season record for stolen bases and win the National League Most Valuable Player Award.
- April 10 – Sal Maglie's major league career comes to an end as the St. Louis Cardinals release the former 20-game winner right before the start of the season.
- April 11 – On Opening Day, Los Angeles Dodgers pitcher Don Drysdale hits a home run, becoming the only pitcher to hit more than one career homer in opening games. (He will hit 29 long balls over his 14-year career.) Drysdale's historic blast doesn't prevent the Dodgers from losing their game, 6–1, to the Chicago Cubs.
- April 17 – Detroit Tigers' Al Kaline belts his 100th career home run.
- April 22 – The Chicago White Sox defeat the Kansas City Athletics 20–6 at Municipal Stadium. The White Sox score 11 of those runs on only one hit in a wild seventh inning. Ray Boone and Al Smith lead off the seventh by reaching on errors. Johnny Callison then collects the hit, a single that scores Boone; on the play, Smith scores and Callison reaches third on a Roger Maris error. Eight of the next nine runs score on ten bases on balls; Callison is hit by a pitch to force in the remaining run. The KC "wild men" are relievers Tom Gorman, Mark Freeman and George Brunet.

=== May ===
- May 2 – Frank Robinson of the Cincinnati Reds hits for the cycle, drives in five runs and scores twice in today's 16–4 triumph over the Los Angeles Dodgers at Crosley Field. Lead-off man Johnny Temple, #2 hitter Vada Pinson and third-place hitter Robinson go a combined nine-for-13, with eight runs scored and 12 runs batted in.
- May 3 – The Detroit Tigers, losers of 15 of their first 17 games, replace manager Bill Norman with Jimmy Dykes. For the veteran Dykes, the Tigers are the fourth big-league team he's managed since 1951. In his first day with the Tigers, his club sweeps a doubleheader from the New York Yankees at Briggs Stadium, with renowned "Sunday slugger" Charlie Maxwell belting four home runs. Under Dykes, Detroit will perk up to go 74–63 for the rest of 1959.
- May 7 – An all-time MLB record crowd of 93,103 gathers at the Los Angeles Memorial Coliseum for "Roy Campanella Night", honoring the former Brooklyn Dodger catcher who was paralyzed in a January 1958 car accident on the eve of his team's move to Los Angeles. In the exhibition game that follows, the visiting New York Yankees defeat the Dodgers, 6–2. The event raises $60,000 to help defray Campanella's medical expenses. The attendance record will stand for almost 49 years until 115,300 witness the March 29, 2008, exhibition contest at the Coliseum between the Dodgers and Boston Red Sox that marks the home side's 50th anniversary in Los Angeles.
- May 10 – At Forbes Field, Jim Hearn of the Philadelphia Phillies gives up two runs to the Pittsburgh Pirates before the second game of a Sunday doubleheader is suspended by curfew. On May 22, the Phillies release Hearn, ending the pitcher's 13-year MLB career. The suspended game is completed July 21, with the Pirates winning 6–4, and Hearn is tagged with the loss almost two months after he retired from baseball.
- May 12 – Yogi Berra of the New York Yankees commits an error, as his errorless streak of 148 games for a catcher comes to an end in a New York 7–6 loss to the Cleveland Indians at Yankee Stadium.

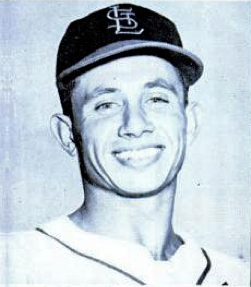
Harvey Haddix (1953)

- May 20 – The New York Yankees' 13–6 loss to the Detroit Tigers at Yankee Stadium drops the New Yorkers to last place in the American League—their first time in the cellar since May 23, 1940. The Yankees had won nine pennants over the previous ten years, only missing out in 1954 when they finished second but won 103 games. They will battle back in 1959 but finish third, 15 lengths behind the pennant-winning White Sox.
- May 26:
  - At County Stadium, Pittsburgh Pirates pitcher Harvey Haddix carries a perfect game into the 13th inning against the Milwaukee Braves, retiring 36 consecutive batters before Félix Mantilla reaches on a Don Hoak error. Haddix then loses the no-hitter and the game on the Braves' only hit when Joe Adcock slugs what appears to be a home run, but is later ruled a double when Adcock passes Mantilla on the bases. The final score is Milwaukee 1, Pittsburgh 0. Winning pitcher Lew Burdette goes all the way and allows 12 Pirate hits.
  - The New York Yankees acquire right-handed pitcher Ralph Terry, 23, and infielder-outfielder Héctor López, 29, from the Kansas City Athletics for pitchers Johnny Kucks, 26, and Tom Sturdivant, 29, and second baseman Jerry Lumpe, 25. Both Terry and López will contribute to the Bombers' early 1960s AL pennants: former Yankee Terry overcomes a crushing defeat in Game 7 of the 1960 World Series to become a 23-game winner and World Series MVP two years later; López will be a key platoon outfielder. Lumpe, meanwhile, will be Kansas City's regular second baseman through 1963.
  - The Washington Senators trade Albie Pearson, 24, the reigning AL Rookie of the Year, to the Baltimore Orioles for fellow outfielder Lenny Green, 26.

=== June ===
- June 8 – The St. Louis Cardinals and Cincinnati Reds exchange right-handed pitchers, with Cincinnati obtaining Jim Brosnan for Hal Jeffcoat. The trade occurs as aspiring writer Brosnan, 29, is working on a breakthrough memoir, The Long Season, the first account of a baseball season as seen through the eyes of a player. Upon publication in 1960, the book is denounced by the baseball establishment, but well-received by critics.
- June 10 – Cleveland Indians right-fielder Rocky Colavito becomes the eighth player in Major League history to hit four home runs in a game. He hits all four in consecutive at-bats, scoring five runs and knocking in six, as the Indians top the Baltimore Orioles, 11–8, at Memorial Stadium.
- June 12 – The Japanese Baseball Hall of Fame opens in Tokyo.
- June 14 – Ernie Banks hits 200th career home run helping Chicago Cubs beat Milwaukee Braves 6–0.

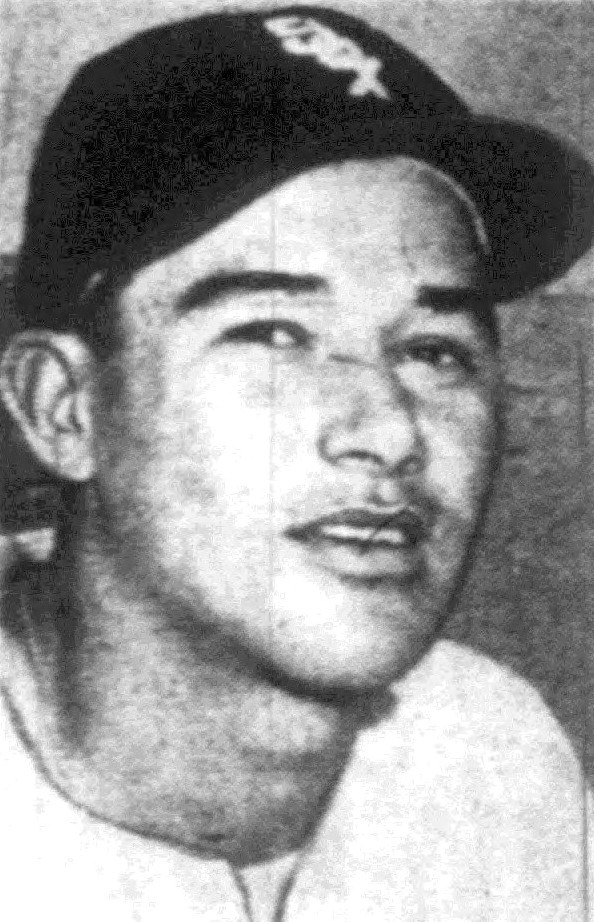
Alfonso "Chico" Carrasquel (1953)

- June 18 – At Memorial Stadium‚ Alfonso "Chico" Carrasquel drives in two runs in both the eighth and ninth innings to give the Baltimore Orioles a 7–6 win over the visiting Detroit Tigers.
- June 21 – At Seals Stadium, Hank Aaron hits three home runs in the Milwaukee Braves' 13–3 victory over the San Francisco Giants. For Aaron, Major League Baseball's future home run king, it will be the only three-home run game of his career.
- June 30 – The St. Louis Cardinals and Chicago Cubs are involved in a bizarre play at Wrigley Field in which two balls are in play at the same time. With one out in the fourth inning, Stan Musial is at the plate with a 3–1 count. The next pitch from the Cubs' Bob Anderson evades catcher Sammy Taylor and rolls to the backstop. Home plate umpire Vic Delmore calls ball four on Musial, much to the chagrin of Anderson and Taylor, both of whom argue that Musial had foul tipped the ball. With the ball still in play and Delmore arguing with both Anderson and Taylor, Musial attempts to run for second. Meanwhile, Cubs third baseman Alvin Dark runs to the backstop and retrieves the ball despite it having ended up in the hands of field announcer Pat Pieper. However, Delmore unknowingly pulls out a new ball and gives it to Taylor. Anderson sees Musial attempting to advance to second and throws the ball to second baseman Tony Taylor, only for it to sail into the outfield. At the same time, Dark throws the original ball to shortstop Ernie Banks. Musial sees Anderson's ball go over Tony Taylor's head and attempts to advance to third, unaware that Dark's throw has reached Banks, who tags Musial. After a delay, Musial is declared out. Both teams play the game under protest; the Cardinals drop theirs after defeating the Cubs 4–1.

=== July ===
- July 2 – Pinky Higgins, manager of the Boston Red Sox since 1955, is fired with his club 31–42 and ensconced in the American League basement. After coach Rudy York handles the club July 3 in Baltimore, Washington Senators coach Billy Jurges, the former standout National League shortstop, is named Higgins' replacement.
- July 4 – After today's holiday action, which often marks the midpoint of an MLB season, there are pennant races in each major league. In the National, the San Francisco Giants (45–34) lead the Milwaukee Braves (43–33–1) by a half game and Los Angeles Dodgers (45–37) by 1½ lengths. In the American, five games separate the top five teams, with Cleveland (43–32) leading Chicago (42–35) by two, followed by Baltimore (41–36), New York (40–37) and Detroit (40–39).
- July 7 – In the season's first All-Star Game, held at Forbes Field, home of the Pittsburgh Pirates, the National League tops the American League 5–4. The NL rallies for two eighth-inning runs, with key hits from Willie Mays and Hank Aaron, to defeat Whitey Ford.
- July 8 – The Cincinnati Reds fire manager Mayo Smith only 80 games into his first year, and replace him with former Detroit Tigers and St. Louis Cardinals skipper Fred Hutchinson, who had been managing the Reds' Triple-A Seattle affiliate.
- July 16 – Fireballing relief pitcher Ryne Duren of the New York Yankees gives up a run for the first time in 2½ months in the eighth inning of today's 7–5 win over the Cleveland Indians in the Bronx. Duren's scoreless string—longest in the majors this season—began May 10 and encompassed 18 appearances and 312/3 innings pitched.
- July 21 – In his MLB debut, Pumpsie Green pinch-runs for veteran Vic Wertz during the eighth inning of a Boston Red Sox 2–1 loss at Comiskey Park, Chicago. Green is left stranded at first, then stays in the game and plays an inning of defense at shortstop. He becomes the first Black player to appear in an official game for the Red Sox, the last of the 16 big-league clubs prior to expansion to break the color barrier.
- July 25–26 – An extra-inning International League game at Havana's Gran Stadium comes to screeching halt in the top of the 12th when impromptu, celebratory gunfire accompanies a fireworks display marking the sixth anniversary of the outbreak of the Cuban Revolution. Frank Verdi, third base coach of the visiting Rochester Red Wings, and Leo Cárdenas, shortstop of the host Havana Sugar Kings, are struck by stray bullets but, miraculously, sustain only minor wounds.
- July 27 – New York attorney William Shea announces the formation of a third major league, the Continental League, to begin play in 1961. One of the charter teams for the league would be placed in New York. The Continental League will disband August 2, 1960 on promises that four of its franchises would be accepted to the National League and American League as expansion franchises.
- July 28:
  - The Chicago White Sox defeat the New York Yankees 4–3 behind southpaw Billy Pierce at Comiskey Park, enabling them to leapfrog the Cleveland Indians into first place in the American League standings. Although Cleveland will challenge them into late September, the White Sox hold on to take their first pennant in 40 years.
  - The Antitrust and Monopoly Subcommittee of the United States Senate, headed by Sen. Estes Kefauver of Tennessee, holds hearings in Washington, D.C., for two bills that would change or codify baseball's anti-trust exemption. It is the fifth time in nine years that baseball has been investigated by the U.S. Congress.
- July 30 – The red-hot Kansas City Athletics win their tenth straight game—and 14th out of their last 16—by defeating the Washington Senators, 4–1. The streak, which began July 14, enables the chronic second-division ball club to climb above .500 at 50–49 and will represent a rare high point in its dismal, 13-season tenure in Kansas City.

=== August ===
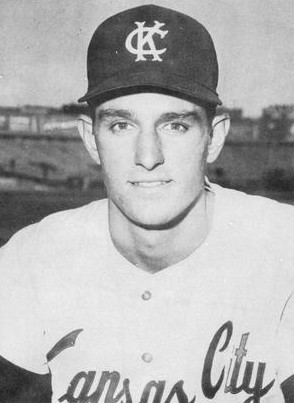
Jerry Walker (1961)

- August 3 – At the Los Angeles Memorial Coliseum, the American League defeats the National League 5–3 in the second All-Star Game of 1959. The Junior Circuit is powered by home runs from Frank Malzone, Yogi Berra and Rocky Colavito, while Frank Robinson and Jim Gilliam homer for the Nationals. The winning pitcher is 20-year-old Jerry Walker.
- August 5 – The Washington Senators lose their 18th straight game, 7–3, in the first game of a doubleheader against the Cleveland Indians at Griffith Stadium. The Senators rebound to take the nightcap, 9–0, behind Tex Clevenger's seven-hitter, but they will drop four more games in a row. Washington is in the midst of a calamitous midsummer collapse that sees them lose 22 of 24 games and plunge from fifth place (July 17) to the basement of the eight-team American League (August 9).
- August 6:
  - In the third marathon contest between the two teams in 1959—and what will be the longest game of the season in MLB—the Chicago White Sox and Baltimore Orioles battle for 18 innings to a 1–1 stalemate at Memorial Stadium before a 12 midnight curfew halts proceedings. Billy Pierce allows one run over 16 innings for the visitors before Turk Lown records two scoreless frames in relief. Billy O'Dell starts for Baltimore and lasts eight innings before turning matters over to knuckleballer Hoyt Wilhelm, who preserves the 1–1 tie with ten innings of scoreless relief. While all statistics from tonight will go into the books, the game will be re-played "from scratch" on September 11.
  - The Pittsburgh Pirates amass 23 hits against the St. Louis Cardinals at Busch Stadium. Veteran catcher Smoky Burgess goes five-for-six and knocks in six runs as the Pirates turn an 8–2 rout into an 18–2 "laugher" with ten ninth-inning tallies.
- August 13 – Led by George Altman's five hits (including two homers) and five runs batted in, the Chicago Cubs batter the San Francisco Giants at Wrigley Field, 20–9.
- August 14 – At Connie Mack Stadium, the Cincinnati Reds battle back from a second-inning 8–0 deficit to defeat the home-standing Philadelphia Phillies, 15–13, on the strength of 23 hits. Vada Pinson and Frank Robinson each go five-for-six; they score a combined seven runs and drive in five. Ex-"Whiz Kid" Willie "Puddin' Head" Jones goes four-for-five and knocks in three runs against his former team.
- August 18 – Hall of Fame executive Branch Rickey, 77, in semi-retirement since October 1955, sells his minority interest in and resigns as chairman of the Pittsburgh Pirates to become president of William Shea's Continental League. The new loop already has granted franchises to Denver, Houston, Minneapolis–Saint Paul and Toronto, as well as New York City. Rickey and a committee of CL owners hold a summit meeting in New York with Commissioner of Baseball Ford Frick, the AL and NL presidents, and a delegation of MLB owners to discuss the possible entry of the Continental circuit into Organized Baseball as a third major league.
- August 25 – The first-place Chicago White Sox add left-handed power to their batting order by acquiring first baseman Ted Kluszewski from the Pittsburgh Pirates for outfielder Harry Simpson and a minor leaguer. The trade will enable Kluszewski, nearly 35, to play in his first World Series—in which he will star (.391, 3 HR, 10 RBI in six games) in a losing cause.
- August 30 – In his 50th appearance of the season, Pittsburgh Pirates relief ace Roy Face wins his 17th consecutive decision—without a loss—in a 7–6 triumph over the Philadelphia Phillies at Forbes Field. Face finally loses a game in his 54th outing, against the Los Angeles Dodgers September 11, but logs his 18th and final victory of 1959 on the 19th. His 18–1 mark yields a .947 winning percentage, which still stands as the best among hurlers with 13 or more decisions.
- August 31 – Sandy Koufax of the Los Angeles Dodgers equals Bob Feller's record of 18 strikeouts in a nine-inning game during a 5–2 triumph over the San Francisco Giants at the LA Coliseum. Koufax also breaks Dizzy Dean's National League standard of 17 Ks, set in 1933. Earlier in 1959, on June 22, Koufax had fanned 16 Philadelphia Phillies in a 6–2 triumph at the Coliseum.

=== September ===
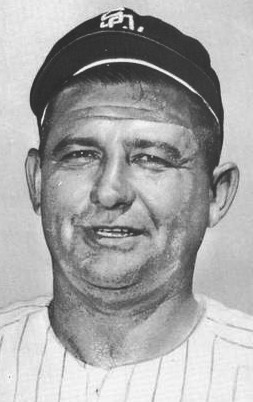
Early Wynn (1958)

- September 2 – Future Hall-of-Fame second baseman Red Schoendienst of the Milwaukee Braves makes his first appearance of the season after recovering from tuberculosis and lung surgery. Pinch-hitting for Juan Pizarro at County Stadium, he grounds out, pitcher (future Hall of Famer Robin Roberts) to first. Schoendienst, 36, will play in only five games this year, but he'll recover fully and appear in 234 more MLB contests before his 1963 playing retirement.
- September 7:
  - At Cleveland Stadium on Labor Day, Jimmy Piersall's two-run, ninth-inning single scores the tying and winning tallies in the Indians' 15–14 come-from-behind victory over the Detroit Tigers in the opening game of a doubleheader. Then, in the nightcap, the Indians stage another ninth-inning, three-run rally to erase a 5–3 deficit and sweep the twin bill, 6–5. Cleveland's two victories enable the Indians (80–56) to keep pace with the Chicago White Sox (85–52–2) and remain 4½ games behind in the American League race; Chicago also sweeps today, taking two from the Kansas City Athletics at Comiskey Park.
  - The three National League contenders all take care of business: the San Francisco Giants and Los Angeles Dodgers each win single contests, while the Milwaukee Braves sweep their doubleheader. The Giants (77–60) lead the Dodgers (74–63) and Braves (74–63–1) by three with 17 contests remaining to play.
- September 11 – Brooks Robinson's 16th-inning single plates Al Pilarcik with the game's only run, enabling the host Baltimore Orioles to sweep the visiting Chicago White Sox, 3–0 and 1–0, in a doubleheader. The marathon, a complete-game shutout for Jerry Walker, the Orioles' 20-year-old right-hander, is the nightcap of a twin bill scheduled to replay a game in early August that ended in an 18-inning, 1–1 tie; today also marks the fourth time in 1959 that the White Sox and Orioles have needed more than 15 frames to decide a contest.
- September 12 – Ken Boyer of the St. Louis Cardinals triples and homers in a 6–4 victory over the Chicago Cubs, extending his hitting streak to 29 games, longest in the majors since 1950. The streak ends the next day.
- September 18 – A season-long feud with general manager "Frantic" Frank Lane spurs Cleveland Indians manager Joe Gordon to announce that he will quit his post after the 1959 season ends. The Indians are still mathematically in pennant contention, although 51/2 games behind the Chicago White Sox.
- September 22:
  - At Cleveland Stadium, the White Sox defeat the Indians 4–2 to clinch the American League pennant. Back-to-back home runs from Al Smith and Jim Rivera in the sixth inning give eventual Cy Young Award winner Early Wynn his 21st victory. The pennant is the first for the White Sox since 1919; that team went on to throw the World Series in what would come to be known as the Black Sox Scandal.
  - With Cleveland now eliminated from the race, Frank Lane fires Joe Gordon immediately. It's revealed the Lane has offered the Indians' 1960 managerial job to Leo Durocher, former skipper of the Brooklyn Dodgers and New York Giants who recently quit as a "color commentator" on "Game of the Week" telecasts.
- September 23 – When contract negotiations break down between Lane and Durocher, the Indians' general manager reverses course and rehires Joe Gordon as his manager, giving him a two-year contract and a raise in salary. "I made a mistake," Lane tells the press. Gordon returns to the Tribe helm for 1960, but on August 3, Lane will fire Gordon again — part of a bizarre "trade" of managers with the Detroit Tigers.
- September 27 – A wild National League pennant race comes down to the final day with three teams—the Milwaukee Braves and Los Angeles Dodgers (each 85–68), and the San Francisco Giants (83–69)—within reach of the championship. A three-way tie is possible, should the Giants win their doubleheader and their foes lose their single games. But the Giants' hopes are crushed when the Braves and Dodgers win and they're swept by the St. Louis Cardinals. Los Angeles and Milwaukee will continue their regular season with the third NL tie-breaker series in 14 years, all of them involving the Dodgers.
- September 28 – Charlie Grimm, known as "Jolly Cholly," is named to replace Bob Scheffing, whose nickname is "Grump," as manager of the Chicago Cubs for 1960. For the affable, 61-year-old Grimm, the appointment represents his third term as skipper of the Cubs, for whom he piloted NL champions in 1932, 1935 and 1945.
- September 28–29 – The Los Angeles Dodgers defeat the Milwaukee Braves in two straight games in a best-of-three playoff series, 3–2 and 6–5, to reach the World Series. In the clinching contest, played in Los Angeles, the Dodgers stage a stirring three-run, ninth-inning rally to tie the score at five, then plate the winning tally in the 12th on a single by Carl Furillo and an error by Braves' shortstop Félix Mantilla.
- September 30 – Bill DeWitt, 57, former owner and general manager of the St. Louis Browns and currently a senior member of the Commissioner of Baseball's staff, becomes president and de facto GM of the Detroit Tigers.

=== October ===
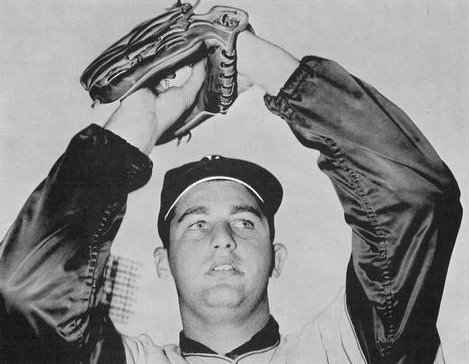
Larry Sherry (1961)

- October 1 – The Go-Go Chicago White Sox change character at home and hammer the Los Angeles Dodgers 11–0 in the first game of the 1959 World Series, as Ted Kluszewski slugs two home runs and drives home five runs. Chicago's Early Wynn and Gerry Staley combine for the shutout. New York Yankees manager Casey Stengel, sitting out only his second World Series since 1949, covers the game as a reporter.
- October 8 – The Los Angeles Dodgers defeat the Chicago White Sox, 9–3, in Game 6 of the World Series to win the franchise's second world championship — and first since moving from Brooklyn in 1958 — four games to two. The Dodgers build an 8–0 lead after four innings and hold on despite Ted Kluszewski's three-run home run. The round-tripper gives the slugger a new six-game RBI record of ten.
  - The Dodgers' Chuck Essegian hits his second pinch homer to establish a new record, later equalled by Bernie Carbo of the Boston Red Sox in 1975.
  - It's the first World Series in which no pitcher for either team pitches a complete game. Dodgers' reliever Larry Sherry—who wins two games (including today's), saves two others, and allows only one run in 122/3 innings of work—is named MVP.
- October 19 – The Baltimore Orioles acquire first baseman Jim Gentile from the Los Angeles Dodgers for $50,000 and two players to be named later—shortstop Willy Miranda and outfielder Bill Lajoie. Gentile, 25, had struggled in two brief stints (1957–1958) as a Dodger, but as an Oriole he will be named to six consecutive AL All-Star teams between 1960 and 1962 and tie Roger Maris for the Junior Circuit's RBI crown (1961).
- October 21 – The Players Association approves two All-Star Games in 1960, to be held at Kansas City Municipal Stadium and Yankee Stadium.
- October 24 – The Milwaukee Braves appoint Chuck Dressen, 64, their manager for 1960. He replaces another veteran pilot, 63-year-old Fred Haney, who stepped down October 4 after leading the Braves to a World Series title (1957), National League pennant (1958), and a flat-footed tie with the Los Angeles Dodgers (1959) in successive seasons. Haney returns to Los Angeles, where a year later he becomes the first general manager and chief architect of the expansion Angels.

=== November ===
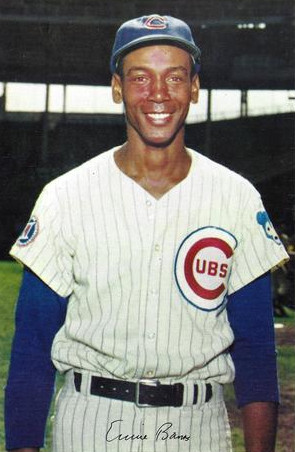
Ernie Banks

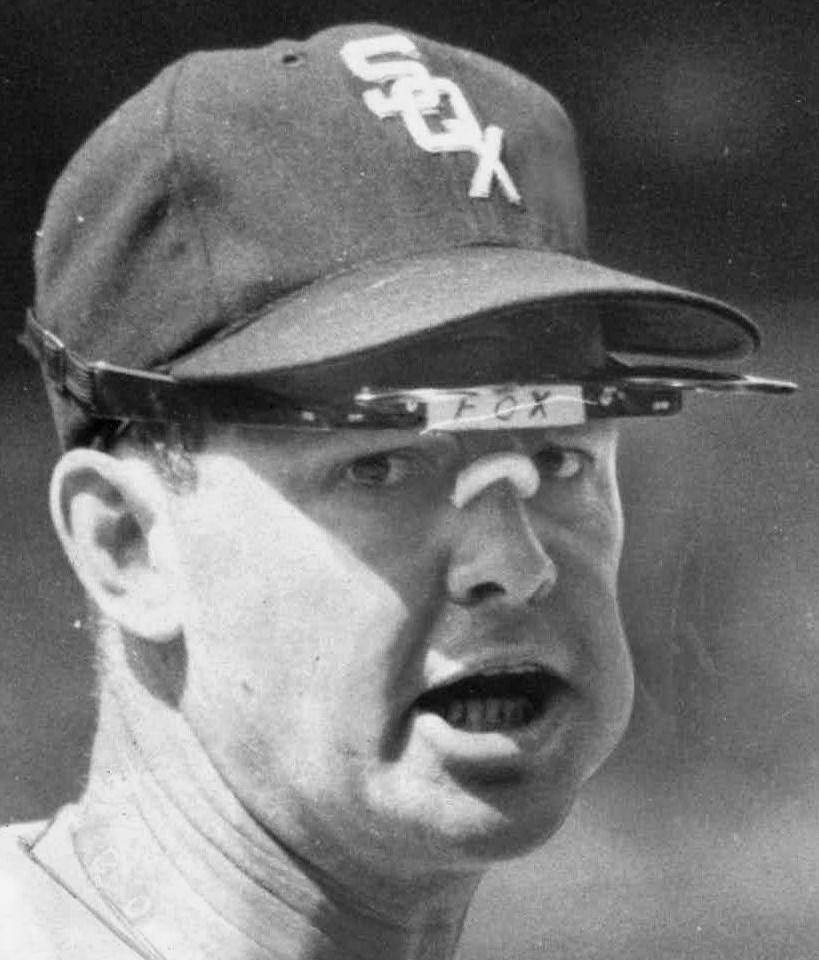
Nellie Fox

- November 3 – Exchanging a pair of 26-year-old former top prospects, the Boston Red Sox trade left-handed pitcher Frank Baumann to the Chicago White Sox for 6 ft 7 in (2.01 m) right-handed-hitting first baseman Ron Jackson. Baumann will post the American League's best earned run average in 1960, while Jackson will play only ten early-season games for Boston and be traded away in mid-May.
- November 4 – Ernie Banks of the Chicago Cubs wins the National League Most Valuable Player Award for the second straight year with 232 points. Eddie Mathews (189) and Hank Aaron (174) of the Milwaukee Braves finish second and third respectively.
- November 12 – Nellie Fox of the Chicago White Sox wins the American League MVP Award with 295 points. Teammates Luis Aparicio (255) and Early Wynn (123) finish second and third respectively.
- November 18 – The Kansas City Athletics change managers, replacing Harry Craft with Bob Elliott, 43, remembered as "Mister Team" and 1947 National League MVP as the third baseman of the Boston Braves.
- November 21 – In the first inter-league trade without waivers, the NL Chicago Cubs send first baseman Jim Marshall and pitcher Dave Hillman to the AL Boston Red Sox in exchange for first baseman Dick Gernert. Also today, the Kansas City Athletics deal catcher Frank House to the Cincinnati Reds for pitcher Tom Acker. The new, annual inter-league trading period lasts from November 21 through December 15, parallel to the winter meetings, and it will be the only means for teams to trade players to the other major league without exposing them to waivers until 1973.
- November 30 – The San Francisco Giants acquire left-hander Billy O'Dell, along with veteran righty Billy Loes, from the Baltimore Orioles for right-hander Gordon Jones, catcher Roger McCardell and outfielder Jackie Brandt.

=== December ===
- December 1 – Another interleague trade sends career National Leaguer Bobby Thomson, 36, from the Chicago Cubs to the Boston Red Sox for pitcher Al Schroll.
- December 2 – The Baltimore Orioles deal veteran outfielder Bob Nieman to the St. Louis Cardinals for catcher/oufielder Gene Green and minor-league catcher Chuck Staniland.
- December 4 – The Cardinals pick up left-handed-swinging backup catcher Carl Sawatski from the Philadelphia Phillies for two "Smiths"—southpaw pitcher Bill Smith and outfielder Bobby Gene Smith.
- December 5 – The Phillies trade their former starting shortstop, Humberto "Chico" Fernández, along with pitcher Ray Semproch, to the Detroit Tigers for infielders Ted Lepcio and Alex Cosmidis and outfielder Ken Walters.
- December 6:
  - The Chicago White Sox reacquire Comiskey Park favorite and future Hall-of-Fame outfielder Minnie Miñoso, 36, as part of a seven-player trade with the Cleveland Indians. In addition to Miñoso, the AL champion White Sox receive pitchers Don Ferrarese and Jake Striker and catcher Dick Brown and send catcher Johnny Romano, first baseman Norm Cash and third baseman Bubba Phillips to Cleveland.
  - The Cincinnati Reds trade third baseman/outfielder Frank Thomas, a three-time NL All-Star, to the Chicago Cubs for left-hander Bill Henry and outfielders Lou Jackson and Lee Walls.
- December 9:
  - The Pittsburgh Pirates trade pitcher Dick Hall, catcher Hank Foiles and infielder Ken Hamlin to the Kansas City Athletics for catcher/utilityman Hal Smith, who will play a key supporting role in the Bucs' 1960 world championship season and its Game 7 win.
  - In an effort to shore up their third base position, the defending AL champion Chicago White Sox trade 20-year-old top prospect Johnny Callison to the Philadelphia Phillies for veteran Gene Freese. Outfielder Callison will blossom into a four-time National League All-Star; Freese spends only one season on the South Side before being traded away.
- December 11 – In a seven-player transaction, the New York Yankees trade outfielders Hank Bauer and Norm Siebern, pitcher Don Larsen and first baseman Marv Throneberry to the Kansas City Athletics in exchange for outfielder Roger Maris, shortstop Joe DeMaestri and first baseman Kent Hadley. Maris proceeds to win the American League Most Valuable Player Award in both 1960 and 1961, breaking Babe Ruth's 60-home-run record in the latter year. Maris' acquisition helps the Yankees win the next five AL pennants in a row.
- December 15 – During the final day of the new interleague trading period, the Cincinnati Reds and Cleveland Indians complete a trade headlined by two veteran second basemen. The Reds send four-time National League All-Star Johnny Temple to Cleveland for second-sacker Billy Martin, pitcher Cal McLish and first baseman Gordy Coleman. The Reds become Martin's fourth team since he was banished from the New York Yankees on June 15, 1957.
- December 21 – The St. Louis Cardinals trade pitcher Tom Cheney and outfielder Gino Cimoli to the Pittsburgh Pirates for pitcher Ron Kline.
- December 22 – The Continental League grows to seven teams with the admission of Dallas–Fort Worth; two weeks earlier, Atlanta had become the CL's sixth franchise.

== Births ==
=== January ===
- January 5 – Milt Thompson
- January 8
  - Craig Gerber
  - Ramón Romero
- January 9 – Otis Nixon
- January 10 – Richard Dotson
- January 11 – Lloyd McClendon
- January 14 – Jeff Keener
- January 16 – Kevin Buckley
- January 17 – T. R. Bryden
- January 21
  - Ricky Adams
  - José Uribe
- January 27 – Greg Bargar
- January 30 – La Schelle Tarver

=== February ===
- February 4
  - Keith Creel
  - Pat Perry
- February 7 – Carlos Ponce
- February 10
  - Jack Fimple
  - Al Jones
- February 14 – Alejandro Sánchez
- February 15 – Joe Hesketh
- February 19
  - Keith Atherton
  - Tim Burke
- February 20 – Bill Gullickson
- February 23 – Eddie Vargas
- February 24 – Bryan Kelly
- February 25 – Ken Dayley

=== March ===
- March 4 – Mike Brown
- March 5 – Andy Rincon
- March 6 – Karl Best
- March 9 – Shooty Babitt
- March 11
  - Phil Bradley
  - Chuck Hensley
- March 13 – Luis Aguayo
- March 15 – Harold Baines
- March 16 – Charles Hudson
- March 17 – Danny Ainge

=== April ===
- April 2 – Al Nipper
- April 4 – Pedro Hernández
- April 13 – Ed Amelung
- April 18
  - Rich Bordi
  - Jim Eisenreich
  - Dennis Rasmussen
- April 19 – R. J. Reynolds
- April 22 – Terry Francona
- April 25 – Tony Phillips

=== May ===
- May 2 – Brick Smith
- May 3 – Tony Arnold
- May 8 – Ricky Nelson
- May 12
  - Kevin Bass
  - Willie Lozado
- May 14 – Brian Greer
- May 16
  - Bob Patterson
  - Mitch Webster
- May 26 – Dann Bilardello
- May 27 – Ron Tingley
- May 28 – Steve Jeltz

=== June ===
- June 6 – Doug Frobel
- June 8 – Britt Burns
- June 11
  - Mike Davis
  - Brian Gorman
- June 25 – Alejandro Peña
- June 27 – Roy Johnson

=== July ===
- July 1 – Tony Walker
- July 3 – Kurt Kepshire
- July 11 – Bert Peña
- July 13 – Mark Brown
- July 21
  - Rich Barnes
  - Mark Williamson
- July 22
  - Bob Porter
  - DeWayne Vaughn
- July 25 – Matt Williams
- July 27 – Joe DeSa
- July 29 – Dave LaPoint
- July 30
  - Ricky Horton
  - Mike Jones
- July 31
  - Mike Bielecki
  - Bob Johnson

=== August ===
- August 3
  - Jim Gott
  - Mike Jeffcoat
- August 8 – Dave Meier
- August 9 – Jim Adduci
- August 13 – Tom Niedenfuer
- August 14
  - Don Carman
  - Dale Scott
- August 17
  - Jeff Moronko
  - Brad Wellman
- August 18 – Terry Blocker

=== September ===
- September 2 – Drungo Hazewood
- September 5 – Jamie Nelson
- September 8 – Glen Cook
- September 9 – Tom Foley
- September 10 – Bruce Robbins
- September 12 – Scotti Madison
- September 16 – Tim Raines
- September 18 – Ryne Sandberg
- September 21 – Danny Cox
- September 22
  - Wally Backman
  - Lee Graham
  - John Stefero
- September 23 – Jim Winn
- September 25 – Geno Petralli
- September 26
  - Rich Gedman
  - J. P. Ricciardi
- September 28 – Todd Worrell

=== October ===
- October 2 – Dave Beard
- October 5 – Rod Allen
- October 6
  - Oil Can Boyd
  - Greg Walker
- October 8
  - Jack Hardy
  - Bryan Little
  - Mike Morgan
- October 9 – Ray Krawczyk
- October 10
  - Don Gordon
  - Les Straker
  - Jim Weaver
- October 11 – Pat Dodson
- October 16
  - Brian Harper
  - Kevin McReynolds
- October 20 – Don Heinkel
- October 21 – George Bell
- October 23 – George Hinshaw
- October 24
  - Mike Brewer
  - Dave Johnson
  - Junior Ortiz
- October 29 – Jesse Barfield
- October 30 – Dave Leeper

=== November ===
- November 5
  - Craig McMurtry
  - Lloyd Moseby
- November 6 – Leo Hernández
- November 7 – Rich Rodas
- November 13 – Dave Shipanoff
- November 17
  - Brad Havens
  - Brian Milner
- November 18 – Jeff Heathcock
- November 21
  - Jeff Barkley
  - Scott Terry
- November 23 – Brook Jacoby
- November 24 – Tom Dunbar
- November 26 – Mike Moore
- November 28 – Jeff Datz
- November 29 – Brian Holton

=== December ===
- December 6 – Larry Sheets
- December 16 – Paul Noce
- December 17
  - Bryan Clutterbuck
  - Marvell Wynne
- December 22 – Orlando Isales
- December 23 – Frank Eufemia
- December 29 – Mike Brown

== Deaths ==
=== January ===
- January 1 – Neck Stanley, 53, left-hander whose pitching career in the Negro leagues spanned 1928 to 1948 and included 12 seasons as a member of the New York Black Yankees.
- January 2 – Bert James, 72, outfielder for the 1909 St. Louis Cardinals.
- January 8 – Harley Dillinger, 64, pitcher who played for the Cleveland Naps in its 1914 season.
- January 14 – John Ganzel, 84, player-manager who played at first base for five major league teams in seven seasons and for several minor league clubs in 14 seasons, managing also the 1908 Cincinnati Reds and during 16 seasons in the minors, while being credited as the first player to hit one home run in the New York Yankees franchise history as a member of the 1903 New York Highlanders.
- January 21 – Hooks Wiltse, 79, crafty left-handed curveball specialist, who pitched for the New York Giants and Brooklyn Tip-Tops over twelve seasons from 1904 to 1915, collecting a career record of 139–90 and 2.47 ERA in 357 games, including a 12–0 record in his first dozen decisions, two 20-win seasons, 27 shutouts, 152 complete games, and a 10-inning no-hitter against the Philadelphia Phillies in 1908.
- January 22 – Ken Williams, 68, left fielder whose 14-season major league career included stints with the Cincinnati Reds, St. Louis Browns and Boston Red Sox spanning 1915–1929, leading the American League with 39 home runs and 155 RBI in 1922, while adding 39 stolen bases to become the first big leaguer to reach the 30 HR/30 SB plateau in the same season.
- January 24 – George Payne, 69, pitcher for the 1920 Chicago White Sox.
- January 28 – Walter Beall, 59, relief pitcher who played for the New York Yankees and Washington Senators spanning five seasons from 1924 to 1929, being also a member of Yankees teams that won American League pennants in 1926 and 1927.
- January 30 – Toots Shultz, 70, pitcher who played for the Philadelphia Phillies in parts of two seasons from 1911–1912.

=== February ===
- February 7 – Nap Lajoie, 84, Hall of Fame second baseman and manager whose 21-year career from 1896 to 1916 included stints with the Philadelphia Phillies, Philadelphia Athletics and Cleveland Bronchos/Naps; posted a .338/.380/.466 batting line with 3,243 hits and 380 stolen bases in his career; won five American League batting crowns, including a modern-era record with a .426 batting average in 1901, when he hit 14 home runs and collected 125 runs batted in to become the first Triple Crown winner in American League history; he won two more RBI titles and compiled 17 seasons with a .300 average or better; in the field, he led in putouts five times, assists three times, double plays five times and fielding percentage four times; became player/manager for the Bronchos in 1903, with the team renaming itself the Naps in his honor through 1914.
- February 12 – Dode Paskert, 77, one of the finest defensive center fielders of the dead-ball era and a reliable leadoff hitter who played from 1907 through 1921 for four National League clubs, batting third in the lineup in each game of the 1915 World Series for the Philadelphia Phillies against the Boston Red Sox, while batting clean-up for the Chicago Cubs in each game of the 1918 World Series, also against the Red Sox.
- February 14 – Eddie Higgins, 70, pitcher who played for the St. Louis Cardinals from 1909 to 1910.
- February 15
  - Bruce Caldwell, 53, two-sport athlete who played as an outfielder and first baseman in Major League Baseball for the 1928 Cleveland Indians and 1932 Brooklyn Dodgers, as well as a running back in the National Football League for the New York Giants in 1928.
  - Lefty Houtz, 83, 19th century third baseman for the 1899 Cincinnati Reds.
- February 16 – Ted Reed, 68, third baseman who played for the Newark Pepper of the outlaw Federal League in its 1915 season.
- February 20 – William Pierson, 59, pitcher who played with the Philadelphia Athletics in parts of three seasons spanning 1918–1924.
- February 21 – Hunter Hill, 79, third baseman who played for the St. Louis Browns and Washington Senators over three seasons from 1903 and 1905.
- February 26 – Howie Fitzgerald, 56, outfielder for the Chicago Cubs and Boston Red Sox in parts of the 1922, 1924, and 1926 seasons.

=== March ===
- March 7 – John Glaiser, 64, pitcher for the 1920 Detroit Tigers.
- March 8
  - Don Flinn, 66, backup outfielder for the 1917 Pittsburgh Pirates.
  - Ormsby Roy, 54, infielder who appeared for the Homestead Grays and Pittsburgh Crawfords of the Negro leagues between 1929 and 1932.
- March 9 – Fin Wilson, 70, pitcher who played from 1914 to 1915 for the Brooklyn Tip-Tops of the Federal League.
- March 11 – Dinty Gearin, 61, pitcher who played with the New York Giants and Boston Braves in a span of two seasons from 1923 to 1924.
- March 15 – Richard Muckerman, 62, principal owner of the St. Louis Browns from 1945 through 1948.
- March 16 – Ben Shaw, 65, catcher and first baseman who played from 1917 to 1918 for the Pittsburgh Pirates.
- March 17 – Howard Ehmke, 64, pitcher who played for the Buffalo Blues, Detroit Tigers, Boston Red Sox and Philadelphia Athletics in 15 seasons between 1915 and 1930, while compiling six 15-win seasons with a career-high 20 victories for the Red Sox in 1923, including a no-hitter in the same season, and later starting Game One of the 1929 World Series for the Connie Mack's Athletics against the Chicago Cubs, throwing a complete game victory and striking out a then series record 13 en route to the series championship.
- March 29 – Johnny Allen, 53, fiercely competitive pitcher for the New York Yankees, Cleveland Indians, St. Louis Browns, Brooklyn Dodgers and New York Giants over 13 seasons from 1932 through 1944, who was a member of the 1932 World Series champion Yankees, earned the 1937 Sporting News Player of the Year Award after a 15–1 season with Cleveland, and was selected to the 1938 MLB All-Star Game.

=== April ===
- April 5 – Frank Bruggy, 67, catcher whose 14-year career included stints with the Philadelphia Phillies, Philadelphia Athletics and Cincinnati Reds spanning five seasons from 1921 to 1925.
- April 7 – Johnson Fry, 65, pitcher for the 1923 Cleveland Indians.
- April 14 – Frank Harter, 72, pitcher who played from with the Cincinnati Reds from 1912–13 and for the Indianapolis Hoosiers of the outlaw Federal League in 1914.
- April 15 – Win Clark, 84, 19th century infielder who played for the 1897 Louisville Colonels.
- April 17 – Fred Brainard, 67, corner infielder and shortstop for the New York Giants in a span of three seasons from 1914–16, who later played and managed for the Newark Bears of the International League.
- April 21
  - Don Black, 41, hard-throwing pitcher for the Philadelphia Athletics and Cleveland Indians over six seasons from 1943 through 1948, whose career ended when he suffered a brain hemorrhage in a ball game, retiring with a 35–54 record, a 3–0 one-hitter game against the St. Louis Browns in his rookie season, and a 3–0 no-hitter over his former Athletics team in 1947, while defeating fellow Bill McCahan, himself a no-hit pitcher in the same season.
  - Clarence Simpson, 53, outfielder who appeared for the Akron Grays and Cleveland Giants of the Negro National League in 1933.

=== May ===
- May 1
  - Fritz Henrich, 59, backup outfielder for the 1924 Philadelphia Phillies.
  - Branch Russell, 63, stalwart outfielder whose decade-long tenure (1922–1931) with the St. Louis Stars of the Negro National League included a stint as playing manager of the 1926 Stars.
- May 3 – Willy Fetzer, 74, three-sport college athlete and head coach during more than a decade, who also played professional baseball with the Philadelphia Athletics of the American League in 1906, and six seasons in Minor League Baseball spanning 1905–1910.
- May 5
  - Verne Clemons, 67, backup catcher who played for the St. Louis Browns and St. Louis Cardinals over parts of seven seasons between 1916 and 1924.
  - George Harney, 68, pitcher for the Chicago American Giants of the Negro National League over eight seasons between 1923 and 1931; led NNL in shutouts (1924) and saves (1926, 1927); player-manager of American Giants for part of 1928.
- May 6
  - Vance McIlree, 61, pitcher for the 1921 Washington Senators.
  - Al Scheer, 70, outfielder who played with the Brooklyn Superbas in 1913 and for the Indianapolis Hoosiers and Newark Peppers from 1914 to 1915.
- May 8 – Basilio Cueria, 60, first baseman/outfielder for the 1922 Cuban Stars West of the Negro National League.
- May 15
  - Tiny Baldwin, 55, second baseman/shortstop for the Indianapolis ABCs, Cleveland Elites and Detroit Stars of the Negro National League in 1925 and 1926.
  - Jake Hewitt, 88, 19th century pitcher who played for the Pittsburgh Pirates in its 1895 season.
  - Fred Johnston, 60, infielder who made four game appearances for the 1924 Brooklyn Robins.
- May 18
  - John Hummel, 76, valuable utility man and aggressive base runner who played for the Brooklyn Superbas, Dodgers, and Robins teams from 1905 through 1915 before joining the New York Yankees in 1918, compiling a .254/.316/.352 batting line career with 991 hits and 119 stolen bases, while appearing in 548 games at second base, 293 in three outfield positions, 160 at first base, and 74 at shortstop.
  - Gene Packard, 71, pitcher for the Cincinnati Reds, Chicago Cubs, Kansas City Packers, St. Louis Cardinals and Philadelphia Phillies in a span of eight seasons from 1912 through 1919, a twice 20-game winner in the Federal League with the Packers from 1914–15, who in 1918 allowed 12 runs in a game with St. Louis and did not take the loss, setting a record that was not matched for 90 years, until Scott Feldman of the Texas Rangers did the same during the 2008 season.
- May 21 – Carter Elliott, 65, shortstop for the 1921 Chicago Cubs.
- May 22
  - Frank Biscan, 39, pitcher who played for the St. Louis Browns in parts of three seasons from 1942 to 1949, one of many ballplayers whose career was interrupted by World War II.
  - Tommy Sheehan, 81, third baseman who played for the New York Giants, Pittsburgh Pirates and Brooklyn Superbas in a span of four seasons from 1900 to 1908.
- May 25 – Dave Brain, 80, English-born third baseman and shortstop whose career spanned only seven years, playing for seven poor clubs and hitting a subpar .252/.292/.363 batting line in 679 games, but saving himself from anonymity by leading the National League with 10 home runs in 1907, to become an early home run king.
- May 26 – Ed Walsh, 78, Hall of Fame pitcher and spitball specialist who played with the Chicago White Sox from 1904 through 1916 and the Boston Braves in 1917, whose finest season came in 1908, when he became the last pitcher in MLB history to win 40 games, set an American League record-breaking 11 shutouts, and posted a 1.82 earned run average, an MLB record that still stands today, while leading the league in innings pitched four times (including a career-high 464 in the same season), in games pitched and saves five times, in starts four, and in ERA, shutouts and strikeouts twice, winning both of his 1906 World Series starts in Games 3 and 5, allowing seven hits and six runs (only one earned), and striking out 17 Chicago Cubs batters in 15 innings of work, en route to the series championship.
- May 28 – Ken Penner, 63, pitcher who played with the 1916 Cleveland Indians and for the NL-Pennant winning Chicago Cubs in 1929.
- May 29 – Dutch Ussat, 55, third baseman and second baseman who played for the Cleveland Indians in the 1925 and 1927 seasons.
- May 30 – Doc Tonkin, 77, pitcher who made only one game appearance in the majors with the 1907 Washington Senators.

=== June ===
- June 9 – Frank Huelsman, 85, regarded as the first player in Major League history to play for four different teams in a season, appearing in 112 games with the Chicago White Sox, Detroit Tigers, St. Louis Browns, and Washington Senators in 1904, who later gained notoriety as a Minor League star, compiling a .342 career batting average over fifteen seasons, including five batting championships, six runs batted in titles, and two Triple Crowns between 1911 and 1913, missing a third title in 1912 by a .002 in batting average.
- June 13 – Irv Higginbotham, 77, pitcher for the St. Louis Cardinals and Chicago Cubs spanning three seasons from 1906 to 1909.
- June 14 – Ed Cotter, 54, third baseman and shortstop who appeared in three games with the Philadelphia Phillies in its 1926 season.
- June 15 – Charlie Eakle, 71, second baseman who played for the Baltimore Terrapins of the outlaw Federal League in 1915.
- June 17
  - Dave Black, 67, pitcher who played with the Chicago Whales and Baltimore Terrapins of the Federal League from 1914 to 1915, and for the Boston Red Sox in their 1923 American League season.
  - Jim McHale, 83, outfielder for the 1908 Boston Red Sox.
- June 20 – Speed Walker, 61, first baseman who appeared in two games for the St. Louis Cardinals in 1923.
- June 22 – Hal Bubser, 63, Minor League first baseman who made three pinch-hit appearances for the Chicago White Sox in 1923.
- June 24
  - Jim Hitchcock, 48, regarded as Auburn University's first All-American in both football and baseball, who briefly played shortstop for the Boston Bees of the National League toward the end of their 1938 season; older brother of Bill Hitchcock.
  - Joe Ogrodowski, 52, pitcher for the 1925 Boston Braves.
- June 28 – Joe Sugden, 88, 19th century catcher who played for five teams between 1893 and 1912, being a member of the Chicago White Stockings 1901 American League Champion Inaugural Roster, and later a St. Louis Cardinals scout for 31 years.
- June 30 – Clarence Berger, 64, backup outfielder for the 1914 Pittsburgh Pirates.

=== July ===
- July 3 – Red Barnes, 54, fourth outfielder who played from 1927 through 1930 for the Washington Senators and Chicago White Sox.
- July 7 – Norwood Gibson, 82, pitcher for the Boston Americans over four seasons from 1903– 1906, who was part of back-to-back American League pennant-winning teams in 1903 and 1904, but did not pitch at all in the 1903 World Series, against the Pittsburgh Pirates, and there was no World Series in 1904 because the New York Giants refused to play Boston.
- July 11 – Frank Gilhooley, 77, fourth outfielder for the St. Louis Cardinals, New York Yankees and Boston Red Sox in parts of nine seasons spanning 1911–1919.
- July 13
  - Nick Kahl, 80, second baseman for the 1905 Cleveland Naps.
  - Chick Keating, 67, shortstop who played with the Chicago Cubs from 1913 to 1915 and for the Philadelphia Phillies in 1926.
- July 16
  - Bob Coleman, 68, player, coach and manager whose career included managing in Minor League Baseball for 35 seasons between 1919 and 1957; backup catcher for the Pittsburgh Pirates and Cleveland Indians in parts of three seasons spanning 1913–1916; coached with the Boston Red Sox in 1926 and 1928, Detroit Tigers in 1932, and Boston Braves in 1943; immediately pressed into service as interim replacement for Casey Stengel as manager of the 1943 Braves before finishing the year as a coach following Stengel's return; then managed Braves full-time from 1944 to July 29, 1945; in 1946, he returned to the minors and win eight pennants and four championships with the Evansville Braves of Class-B Three-I League, retiring with the most victories (2,496) of any manager in minor league history until he was surpassed by Stan Wasiak (2,530).
  - Jimmy Ripple, 49, outfielder who played for the New York Giants, Brooklyn Dodgers, Cincinnati Reds and Philadelphia Athletics through seven seasons spanning 1936–1943, being also a member of two Giants teams that won the National League pennant in 1936 and 1937, as well as for the 1940 World Series Reds Champion Team.
- July 20 – Morrie Arnovich, 48, All-Star left fielder who played for the Philadelphia Athletics, Cincinnati Reds and New York Giants in seven seasons between 1936 and 1946, winning a World Series ring with the 1940 World Champions Cincinnati Reds.
- July 21 – Bill Hoffer, 88, 19th century pitcher who played for the Baltimore Orioles, Pittsburgh Pirates and Cleveland Blues in a span of six seasons between 1895 and 1901, going 31-6 in his rookie season and leading the National League in W-L% (.838), while the Orioles won the pennant, and followed up with two more good seasons, posting a 25–7 record and a best W-L% (.781) in 1896 and 22-11 in 1897, as Baltimore won the pennant again in 1896 and finished a close second place in 1897.
- July 22 – Ralph Savidge, 80, pitcher for the Cincinnati Reds in the 1908 and 1909 seasons.
- July 25
  - Jim Boyer, 50, American League umpire who worked in 1,025 games from 1944 to 1950, including appearances in the 1947 World Series and the 1947 MLB All-Star Game.
  - Buck O'Brien, 77, pitcher for the Boston Red Sox and Chicago White Sox over three seasons from 1911 to 1913, who went 20-13 for Boston in 1912, being the Opening Day starter and winner that season, later starting the first game played at Fenway Park on April 20, 1912, and also a member of the 1912 World Series Red Sox champion team.
- July 25 – Joe Schepner, 85, third baseman for the 1919 St. Louis Browns.
- July 26 – Otto Miller, 58, third baseman for the St. Louis Browns and Boston Red Sox in parts of four seasons from 1927 to 1932.
- July 28 – Frank Ragland, 55, pitcher who played with the Washington Senators in 1932 and for the Philadelphia Phillies in 1933.
- July 29 – Boileryard Clarke, 90, 19th century catcher and first baseman who played from 1893 through 1905 for the Baltimore Orioles, Boston Beaneaters, Washington Senators and New York Giants, compiling a .256/.310/.326 batting line in 950 games, while leading American League backstops in games caught (87) and fielding percentage (.972) in 1902.

=== August ===
- August 1 – Harvey Young, 38, diminutive (5 ft 2 in (1.57 m)) shortstop for four Negro leagues clubs between 1941 and 1944, including the Baltimore Elite Giants and Kansas City Monarchs.
- August 4
  - Chappy Charles, 78, infielder who played from 1908 through 1910 for the St. Louis Cardinals and Cincinnati Reds.
  - Pop Williams, 85, pitcher who played for four National League clubs in parts of three seasons spanning 1898–1903, as most of his appearances were for the 1902 Chicago Orphans.
- August 7
  - Ben Dyer, 66, reliable utility man who, besides pitching, played all positions except catcher for the New York Giants and Detroit Tigers in a span of six seasons from 1914 to 1919.
  - Bill McGill, 79, pitcher for the 1907 St. Louis Browns.
- August 8 – Phil Lewis, 75, shortstop who played for the Brooklyn Superbas over four seasons from 1905 to 1908.
- August 12
  - Johnny Burnett, 54, shortstop who played with the Cleveland Indians from 1927 through 1934 and for the St. Louis Browns in 1935.
  - Ed Goebel, 60, outfielder for the 1922 Washington Senators.
  - Mike O'Neill, 81, Irish-born starting pitcher, left fielder and pinch-hitter, whose career included stints with the St. Louis Cardinals from 1901 to 1904 and the Cincinnati Reds in 1907, posting a career pitching record of 32–44 with a 2.73 ERA in 85 games, while belting the first ever pinch hit grand slam in Major League history, an inside-the-park homer off fellow Togie Pittinger of the Boston Beaneaters in 1902; elder sibling of Steve O'Neill and one of four brothers who played in majors.
- August 27 – Claude Jonnard, 61, pitcher who played for the New York Giants and St. Louis Browns over six seasons from 1921 to 1926; member of the Giants teams that won the National League pennants in 1923 and 1924; twin brother of Bubber Jonnard.

=== September ===
- September 3 – Emmett Bowles, 61, who made one pitching appearance for the Chicago White Sox in its 1922 season.
- September 6 – John "Yellowhorse" Morris, 57, pitcher for the Kansas City Monarchs, Detroit Stars and Chicago American Giants of the Negro National League between 1924 and 1930 who won 14 games for the 1928 Stars.
- September 8 – Roy Mitchell, 74, pitcher for the St. Louis Browns, Chicago White Sox and Cincinnati Reds over six seasons spanning from 1910 to 1919, who was a member of the 1919 World Series Champion Reds team.
- September 9 – Terry Lyons, 50, first baseman for the 1929 Philadelphia Phillies.
- September 14 – Bill Upham, 71, pitcher who played in 1915 with the Brooklyn Tip-Tops of the Federal League and for the Boston Braves of the National League in 1918.
- September 20 – Tilly Walker, 72, strong-armed outfielder for the Washington Senators, St. Louis Browns, Boston Red Sox and Philadelphia Athletics in a 13-season career from 1911 to 1923, who hit 11 home runs in 1918 to tie Babe Ruth for the American League lead in home runs, ranking amongst the top five in the league every year from 1919 to 1922, when he belted a career-best 37 homers, while leading the league in outfield assists six times and winning a World Series title with the Boston Red Sox in 1916.
- September 28
  - Art Brouthers, 76, third baseman for the 1906 Philadelphia Athletics.
  - Red Corriden, 72, whose career spanned from 1908 through his retirement 1n 1958, playing parts of five seasons in the majors and serving as the regular shorstop for the Chicago Cubs in 1914, playing also in the minor leagues during the 1920s, later coaching in the majors from 1932 to 1948 while managing the 1950 Chicago White Sox, being a member of five pennant-winning teams and the 1947 World Champions New York Yankees, and finally scouting for the Brooklyn and Los Angeles Dodgers teams from 1951 to 1958.

=== October ===
- October 10 – Bunny Hearn, 68, pitcher for the St. Louis Cardinals, New York Giants, Pittsburgh Rebels and Boston Braves in parts of six seasons spanning 1910–1920, who later became a longtime baseball head coach at UNC, where he guided the North Carolina Tar Heels to six Southern Conference titles and two Ration League titles, compiling a record of 214–133–2 while in UNC-Chapel Hill.
- October 13 – Dave Wills, 82, 19th century first baseman who played for the Louisville Colonels in their 1899 season.
- October 16
  - Sled Allen, 72, catcher for the 1910 St. Louis Browns.
  - Herb Bradley, 56, pitcher who played 1927 through 1929 for the Boston Red Sox.
  - Frank Okrie, 62, pitcher for the 1920 Detroit Tigers; father of Len Okrie.
- October 18 – Ralph Bell, 68, pitcher who played for the Chicago White Sox in their 1912 season.
- October 21
  - Jesse Barber, 71, nicknamed "Phantom", outfielder whose career in Black baseball began in 1909, before the formal organization of the Negro leagues, and included multiple seasons for the Chicago American Giants.
  - Elmer Rieger, 70, pitcher for the 1910 St. Louis Cardinals.
- October 27
  - Elmer Koestner, 73, pitcher who played with the Cleveland Naps in 1910 and for the Chicago Cubs and Cincinnati Reds in 1914.
  - Scott Perry, 68, pitcher who played from 1915 through 1921 for the St. Louis Browns, Chicago Cubs, Cincinnati Reds and Philadelphia Athletics.
- October 29 – Dave Fultz, 84, All-American, two-sport athlete at Brown University, who later played in Major League Baseball as an outfielder/infielder with the Philadelphia Phillies, Baltimore Orioles, Philadelphia Athletics and New York Highlanders in seven seasons from 1898 to 1905, before becoming a lawyer and unionizing Major League ballplayers in an organization called the Fraternity of Baseball Players, which operated during the rocky Federal League era.

=== November ===
- November 4 – Lefty Williams, 66, curveball specialist pitcher who recorded back-to-back 20-win seasons with the Chicago White Sox in 1919 and 1920, whose career was truncated when he and seven of his teammates were expelled from Organized Baseball for their roles in losing the tainted 1919 World Series to the Cincinnati Reds, an incident known as the Black Sox Scandal.
- November 15 – Klondike Smith, 72, English outfielder who played for the 1912 New York Highlanders.
- November 18 – Wib Smith, 73, backup catcher who played for the St. Louis Browns in its 1909 season.
- November 20 – Roy Thomas, 85, Philadelphia Phillies speedy center fielder and reliable leadoff hitter who batted .300 five times, leading the National League in walks in seven of his nine full major-league seasons from 1899 to 1907, scoring at least 100 runs four times while leading all outfielders in putouts three times, fielding average and assists once each, and total chances per game twice, ending with a career .290/413/.333 batting line and 244 stolen bases in 1,470 games.
- November 28
  - Ed McFarland, 85, slick-fielding catcher who played for the Cleveland Spiders, St. Louis Browns, Philadelphia Phillies, Chicago White Sox and Boston Red Sox in 14 seasons spanning 1896–1908, while helping the White Sox win the 1906 World Series over the Chicago Cubs in six games, for one of the greatest upsets in Series history.
  - Blondy Ryan, 53, middle infielder and third baseman who played for the Chicago White Sox, New York Giants, Philadelphia Phillies and New York Yankees in parts of seven seasons from 1930 to 1938, whose hitting and fielding hustle led the Giants to the 1933 World Series championship.
- November 30 – Jack Scott, 67, knuckleball pitcher who played from 1916 through 1929 for five teams, posting a career record of 103–109 and 3.85 ERA, while throwing a four-hit shutout for the New York Giants in Game 3 of the 1922 World Series against the New York Yankees, en route to the series championship.

=== December ===
- December 5 – Oscar Siemer, 58, catcher who played from 1925 to 1926 with the Boston Braves.
- December 6 – Wid Conroy, 82, valuable utility man who played every infield and outfield position for the Milwaukee Brewers, Pittsburgh Pirates, New York Highlanders and Washington Senators over 12 seasons from 1901 to 1911, being also the first-string shortstop of the 1902 National League Champion Pirates.
- December 7 – Tom McGuire, 67, pitcher who played with the Chicago Whales in 1914 and for the Chicago White Sox in 1919.
- December 9 – Ferd Eunick, 67, third baseman for the 1917 Cleveland Indians.
- December 10 – Joe Harris, 68, first baseman and outfielder whose Major League career included stints with the New York Yankees, Cleveland Indians, Boston Red Sox, Washington Senators, Pittsburgh Pirates and Brooklyn Robins spanning ten seasons between 1914 and 1928, batting over .300 eight times, including a .323 mark to help the Senators to reach the 1925 World Series; became the first player to hit a home run in his first World Series at bat, while going 11-for-25 (.440) with three homers, two doubles, six runs batted in and three two-hit games for a slugging average of .880 in the seven-game Series loss to Pittsburgh.
- December 11
  - Jim Bottomley, 59, Hall of Fame first baseman and 1928 National League MVP Award winner, who in his 11-season tenure with the St. Louis Cardinals drove in 100 or more runs six years in a row from 1924 to 1929, leading the league twice in RBI, doubles and fielding putouts, and once in hits, triples and home runs, while establishing Major League records for the most unassisted double plays in a season by a first baseman with eight in 1936, and for driving in 12 runs in a nine inning game in 1924, which was matched 69 years later by fellow Cardinals outfielder Mark Whiten in 1993.
  - Doc Marshall, 84, backup catcher who played for seven teams over parts of four seasons from 1904 to 1909, being a member of the 1908 Chicago Cubs club that won the National League pennant, but he did not play in the World Series.
- December 16 – Lee Dashner, 72, pitcher for the 1903 Cleveland Naps.
- December 17 – Del Young, 74, outfielder who played with the Cincinnati Reds in 1909, and for the Buffalo Blues of the outlaw Federal League from 1914 to 1915.
- December 24 – Bill Friel, 83, infield and outfield utility who debuted with the Milwaukee Brewers of the American League in 1901 and remained with the franchise in 1902–1903 after it moved and became the St. Louis Browns.
- December 30 – Lew Whistler, 91, 19th century first baseman who played from 1890 through 1893 for the New York Giants, Baltimore Orioles, Louisville Colonels and St. Louis Browns.
