= Reading High School =

Reading High School may refer to:

- North Reading High School, North Reading, Massachusetts, United States
- Reading Senior High School, Reading, Pennsylvania, United States
- Reading High School (Ohio), Reading, Ohio, United States
- Reading Memorial High School, Reading, Massachusetts, United States
- The original name of The Abbey School, Reading, Berkshire, England
