= Art Kenney =

American baseball player (1916-2014)

- Pitcher
- Born: April 29, 1916; Milford, Massachusetts, U.S.
- Died: March 12, 2014 (aged 97); Littleton, New Hampshire, U.S.
- Batted: Left Threw: Left

MLB debut
- July 1, 1938, for the Boston Bees

Last MLB appearance
- July 4, 1938, for the Boston Bees

MLB statistics
- Win–loss record: 0–0
- Earned run average: 15.43
- Strikeouts: 2
- Stats at Baseball Reference

Teams
- Boston Bees (1938)

Arthur Joseph Kenney (April 29, 1916 – March 12, 2014) was an American professional baseball pitcher. He played in Major League Baseball for the Boston Bees during the 1938 season. Listed at 6 ft 0 in (1.83 m), 175 lb (79 kg), he batted and threw left-handed.

== Biography ==
A native of Milford, Massachusetts, Kenney led Milford High School to a state baseball championship in 1932. He was a standout college baseball player at Holy Cross, where he posted a career 16–4 record and is a member of the school's athletic hall of fame. While at Holy Cross, Kenney played summer baseball in the Cape Cod Baseball League, pitching for the league's Harwich team in 1937, where he was described as the "cream of the pitchers". In a 1938 exhibition game against the Boston Red Sox, he hurled four innings for Holy Cross, striking out Baseball Hall of Famer Jimmie Foxx twice in a 3–2 upset win over the big leaguers.

Kenney appeared in two major league games, pitching in relief twice for the Boston Bees (Braves) during their 1938 season under manager Casey Stengel. His first appearance came on July 1 in the second game of a doubleheader against the Philadelphia Phillies at Braves Field. Kenney pitched the ninth inning in relief of Dick Errickson in the Braves' 5–0 loss. His second appearance came three days later on July 4 in the second game of another twin-bill with the Phillies, this time at Shibe Park. Kenney tossed 1 1/3 innings again in relief of Errickson as the Braves took another loss, 10–2. Over his two big league appearances, Kenney allowed three hits and four earned runs in 2 1/3 innings pitched for a 15.34 ERA. He recorded two strikeouts and eight walks, did not have a decision, and did not come to bat.

Kenney served in the US Army Air Force during World War II. He went on to work as an educator, eventually becoming the principal of Littleton High School in Littleton, New Hampshire (1950–63), and later the principal of North Reading High School in North Reading, Massachusetts (1964–81). The 92-year-old Kenney was honored during pre-game festivities at Fenway Park in 2008. At 97, Kenney was recognized as one of the oldest living major league ballplayers and was the last living player from the Boston Bees. He died in Littleton on March 12, 2014.
