= North Reading, Massachusetts =

- Town
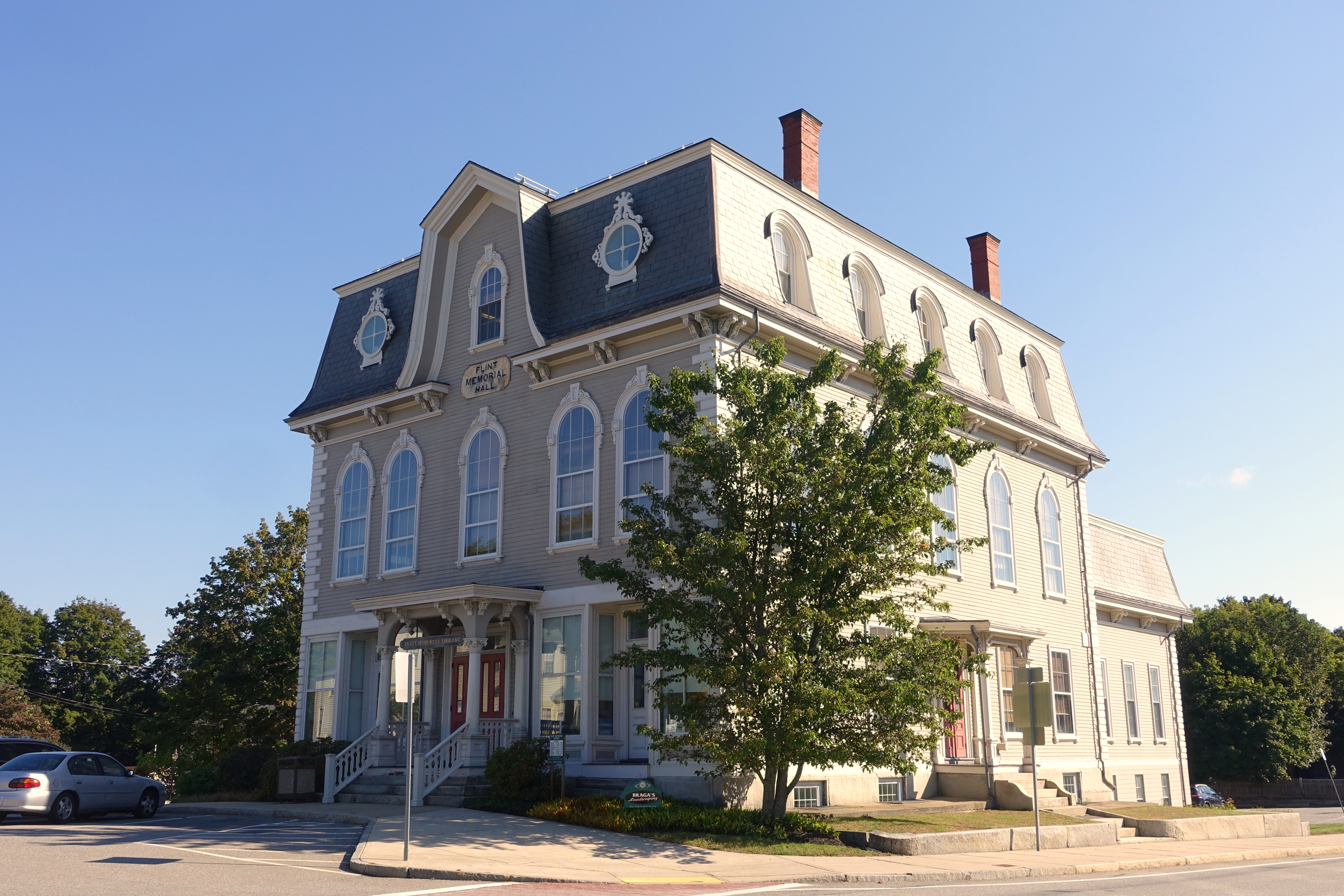
- Flint Memorial Library

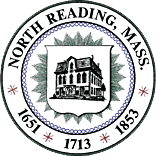
- Seal

- Location in Middlesex County in Massachusetts
- Coordinates: 42°34′30″N 71°04′45″W
- Country: United States
- State: Massachusetts
- County: Middlesex
- Settled: 1651
- Incorporated: 1853

Government
  - Type: Open town meeting
  - Town Administrator: Michael Gilleberto

Area
  - Total: 13.5 sq mi (35.0 km^{2})
  - Land: 13.2 sq mi (34.3 km^{2})
  - Water: 0.23 sq mi (0.6 km^{2})
- Elevation: 98 ft (30 m)

Population (2020)
  - Total: 15,554
  - Density: 1,170/sq mi (453/km^{2})
- Time zone: UTC-5 (Eastern)
  - Summer (DST): UTC-4 (Eastern)
- ZIP code: 01864
- Area code: 351 / 978
- FIPS code: 25-48955
- GNIS feature ID: 0618230
- Website: http://www.northreadingma.gov

North Reading (pronounced, as is with Reading as (/ˈrɛdɪŋ/) is a town in Middlesex County, Massachusetts, United States. The population was 15,554 at the 2020 census.

== History ==
The area was first settled in 1651 when the town of Reading received a special land grant north of the Ipswich River. It was officially incorporated as the separate town of North Reading in 1853. North Reading borders Andover, North Andover, Middleton, Lynnfield, Reading, and Wilmington.

A historical source wrote:

Original grants of large farmsteads along the river during the mid-17th century brought six families to the settlement before 1680. The economy of the town in the 17th and 18th century was based on subsistence farming with limited hop production. There was a sawmill on Lob's Pond by 1694 and grist and saw mills at the village center by 1794. Some small scale boot and shoe making was underway by 1820, and by 1850 small sheds or shops to make shoes were attached to almost every house in town. These shops produced cheap footwear that was sold south to clothe slaves, and the Civil War destroyed the town's industry. The principal products of the town in the early 20th century were milk, apples and fruits.

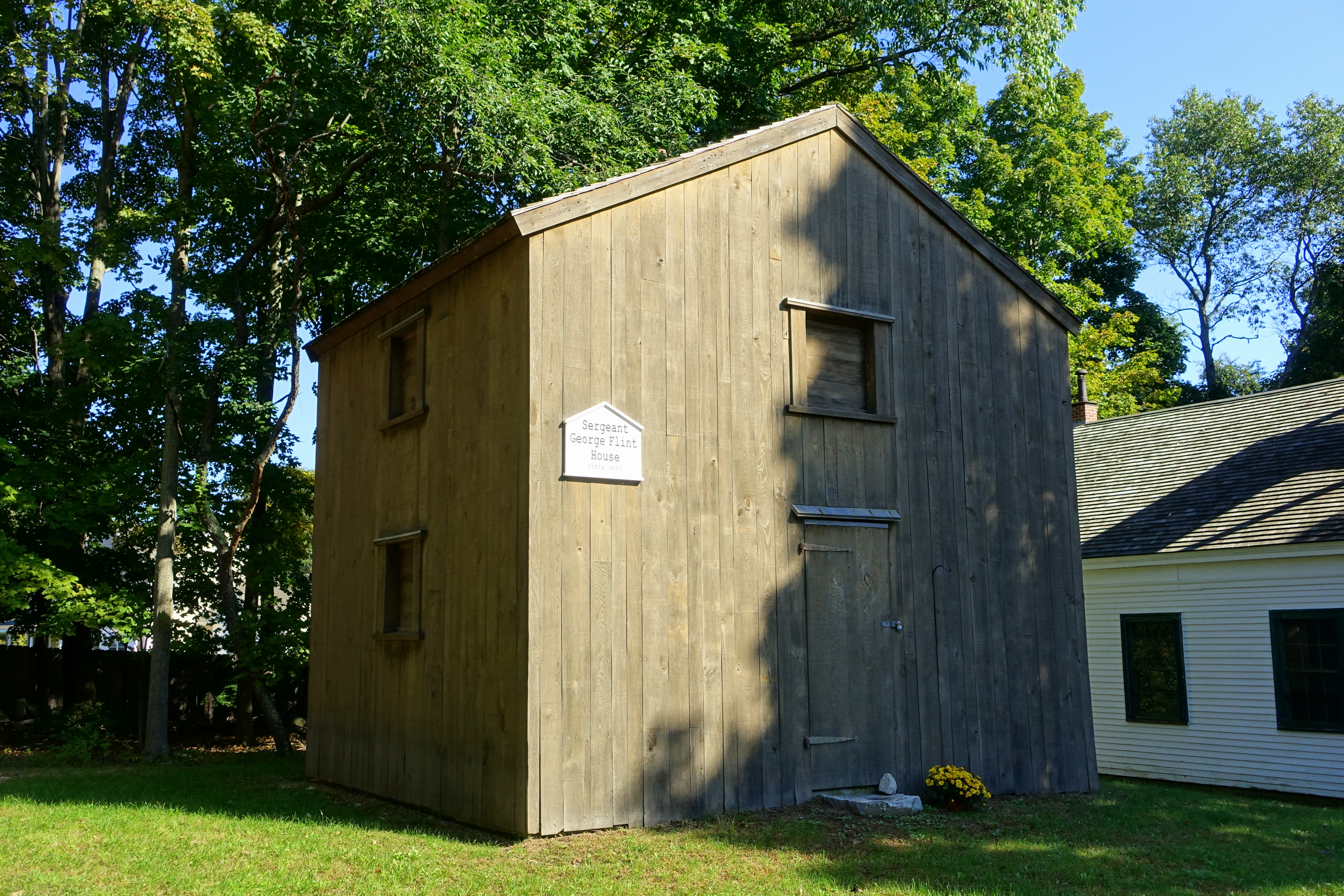
The Sergeant George Flint House was built about 1680. The house still stands and is owned by the North Reading Historical and Antiquarian Society.

== Geography ==
According to the United States Census Bureau, the town has a total area of 13.5 square miles (35.0 km^{2}), of which 13.2 square miles (34.3 km^{2}) is land and 0.2 square miles (0.6 km^{2}), or 1.85%, is water.

== Demographics ==
Historical population
Year	Pop.	±%
1860	1,203	—
1870	942	−21.7%
1880	900	−4.5%
1890	874	−2.9%
1900	1,035	+18.4%
1910	1,059	+2.3%
1920	1,286	+21.4%
1930	1,945	+51.2%
1940	2,886	+48.4%
1950	4,402	+52.5%
1960	8,331	+89.3%
1970	11,264	+35.2%
1980	11,455	+1.7%
1990	12,002	+4.8%
2000	13,837	+15.3%
2010	14,892	+7.6%
2020	15,554	+4.4%
2024*	16,379	+5.3%
* = population estimate. Source: United States Census records and Population Estimates Program data.

As of the census of 2000, there were 13,837 people, 4,795 households, and 3,754 families residing in the town. The population density was 1,044.0 inhabitants per square mile (403.1/km^{2}). There were 4,870 housing units at an average density of 367.4 per square mile (141.9/km^{2}). The racial makeup of the town was 97.53% White, 0.40% African American, 0.04% Native American, 1.30% Asian, 0.01% Pacific Islander, 0.24% from other races, and 0.48% from two or more backgrounds. Hispanic or Latino of any race were 0.74% of the population.

There were 4,795 households, out of which 40.0% had children under the age of 18 living with them, 68.9% were married couples living together, 7.0% had a female householder with no husband present, and 21.7% were non-families. 17.9% of all households were made up of individuals, and 6.1% had someone living alone who was 65 years of age or older. The average household size was 2.86 and the average family size was 3.28.

In the town, the population was spread out, with 27.5% under the age of 18, 5.5% from 18 to 24, 31.4% from 25 to 44, 25.2% from 45 to 64, and 10.4% who were 65 years of age or older. The median age was 38 years. For every 100 females, there were 97.1 males. For every 100 females age 18 and over, there were 94.5 males.

The median income for a household in the town was $76,962, and the median income for a family was $86,341. Males had a median income of $52,446 versus $39,458 for females. The per capita income for the town was $30,902. About 0.7% of families and 1.5% of the population were below the poverty line, including 0.4% of those under age 18 and 2.8% of those age 65 or over.

== Government ==
The North Reading Board of Selectmen has five members who are elected to serve three-year overlapping terms. As specified in the Town Charter and the Massachusetts General Laws, they are the chief elected officers of the town. The board may enact rules and regulations in a variety of areas, as well as establish town policies and procedures on many issues, unless such issues are delegated by law or vote of the town meeting to another officer or board. The board appoints a Town Administrator who supervises and is responsible for the day-to-day operation of town government departments.

== Education ==
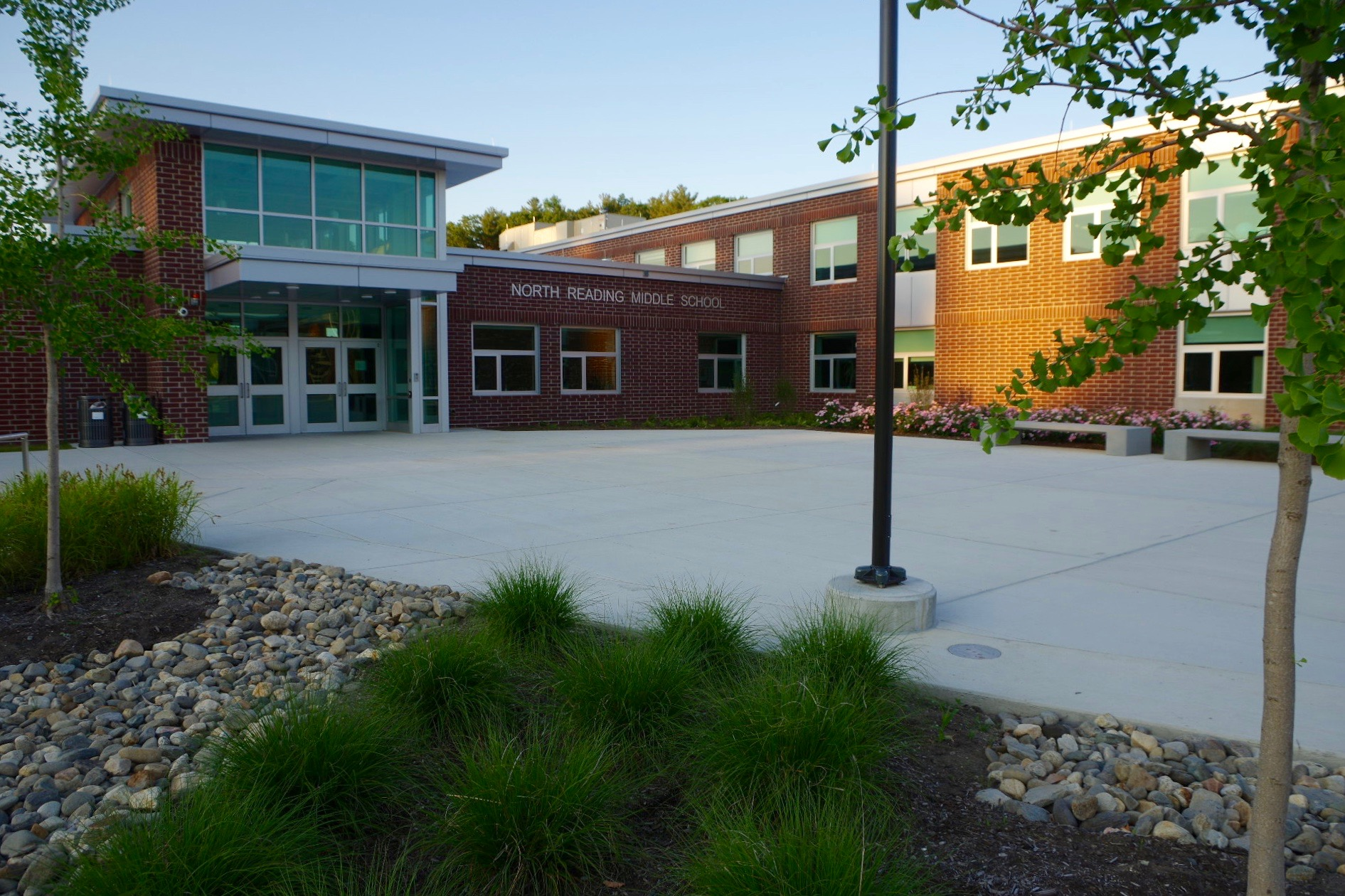
North Reading Middle School

- North Reading High School
- North Reading Middle School
- E. Ethel Little School
- Turner Hood School
- L. D. Batchelder School

== Infrastructure ==
=== Emergency services ===
North Reading is protected by the North Reading Fire Department and North Reading Police Department. The fire department is staffed by full-time members, and is supplemented by a smaller call member roster.

== Notable people ==
- William Taylor Adams (1822–1897), author under the name "Oliver Optic"
- Jonathan Bird (born 1969), Emmy-winning television producer
- Alex Carpenter (born 1994), ice hockey player for PWHL New York. Carpenter played for Boston College, the Boston Pride, and Shenzhen KRS, and was a member of Team USA at the 2014 and 2022 Winter Olympics
- Edward J. Collins, Jr. (1943–2007), government official
- Jon Favreau (born 1981), director of speechwriting for Barack Obama, co-founder of Crooked Media, and co-host of the political podcast Pod Save America
- Casey Fitzgerald (born 1997), ice hockey player with the Buffalo Sabres
- Ryan Fitzgerald (born 1994), ice hockey player with the Providence Bruins. Fitzgerald played with the Boston College Eagles and was selected in the fourth round of the 2013 NHL entry draft by the Boston Bruins
- Tom Fitzgerald (born 1968), general manager of the New Jersey Devils
- Art Kenney (1916–2014), Major League baseball player and principal of North Reading High School
- George Frederick Root (1820–1895), songwriter who found fame during the Civil War
- Jimmy Vesey (born 1993), ice hockey player with the New York Rangers. Vesey attended and played for North Reading High School, Belmont Hill School, and Harvard University prior to signing with the New York Rangers in 2016
