= Jake Hewitt =

American baseball player (1870–1959)

- Pitcher
- Born: June 6, 1870; Maidsville, West Virginia, U.S.
- Died: May 15, 1959 (aged 88); Morgantown, West Virginia, U.S.
- Batted: Left Threw: Left

MLB debut
- August 6, 1895, for the Pittsburgh Pirates

Last MLB appearance
- August 16, 1895, for the Pittsburgh Pirates

MLB statistics
- Win–loss record: 1–0
- Earned run average: 4.15
- Strikeouts: 4
- Stats at Baseball Reference

Teams
- Pittsburgh Pirates (1895)

Charles Jacob Hewitt (June 6, 1870 – May 15, 1959) was an American pitcher in Major League Baseball. He was the first left-handed pitcher for the Pittsburgh Pirates in 1895. Hewitt played two seasons of college baseball (1894–1895) for the West Virginia Mountaineers.
