= List of Major League Baseball single-season records =

This is a list of single-season records in Major League Baseball.

== Batting records ==
=== Overview (1876–present) ===
Records	Player	#	Season	Refs
Games	Maury Wills	165	1962	
Highest batting average	Tetelo Vargas	.471	1943	
Most singles	Ichiro Suzuki	225	2004	
Most doubles	Earl Webb	67	1931	
Most triples	Chief Wilson	36	1912	
Most home runs	Barry Bonds	73	2001	
Most runs batted in	Hack Wilson	191	1930	
Most hits	Ichiro Suzuki	262	2004	
Most runs scored	Billy Hamilton	198	1894	
Highest on-base percentage	Barry Bonds	.609	2004	
Most stolen bases (Note: Prior to 1898, a player was credited with a stolen base if he took an extra base on a base hit by another player. For example, a baserunner is on first base and the batter singles to right field. If the baserunner reaches second base, then proceeds to take third, he would be credited with a stolen base. The single-season record under modern rules is 130 by Rickey Henderson in 1982.)	Hugh Nicol; Rickey Henderson	138; 130	1887; 1982	
Highest slugging percentage	Josh Gibson	.974	1937	
Highest OPS	Josh Gibson	1.4744	1937	
Most walks	Barry Bonds	232	2004	
Most strikeouts	Nolan Ryan	383	1973	
Most extra base hits	Babe Ruth	119	1921	
Most total bases	Babe Ruth	457	1921	
Consecutive game hitting streak	Joe DiMaggio	56	1941	
Most at-bats	Jimmy Rollins	716	2007	

=== Home runs ===
Player	Team	Home runs	Season
Barry Bonds	San Francisco Giants	73	2001
Mark McGwire	St. Louis Cardinals	70	1998
Sammy Sosa	Chicago Cubs	66	1998
Mark McGwire	St. Louis Cardinals	65	1999
Sammy Sosa	Chicago Cubs	64	2001
Sammy Sosa	Chicago Cubs	63	1999
Aaron Judge	New York Yankees	62	2022
Roger Maris	New York Yankees	61	1962
Babe Ruth	New York Yankees	60	1927
Cal Raleigh	Seattle Mariners	60	2025

- Most Grand Slams By a Pitcher in One Season: Tony Cloninger, Madison Bumgarner, 2

=== Hits ===
Player	Team	Hits	Season
Ichiro Suzuki	Seattle Mariners	262	2004
George Sisler	St. Louis Browns	257	1920
Bill Terry	New York Giants	254	1930
Lefty O'Doul	Philadelphia Phillies	254	1929

=== Runs batted in ===
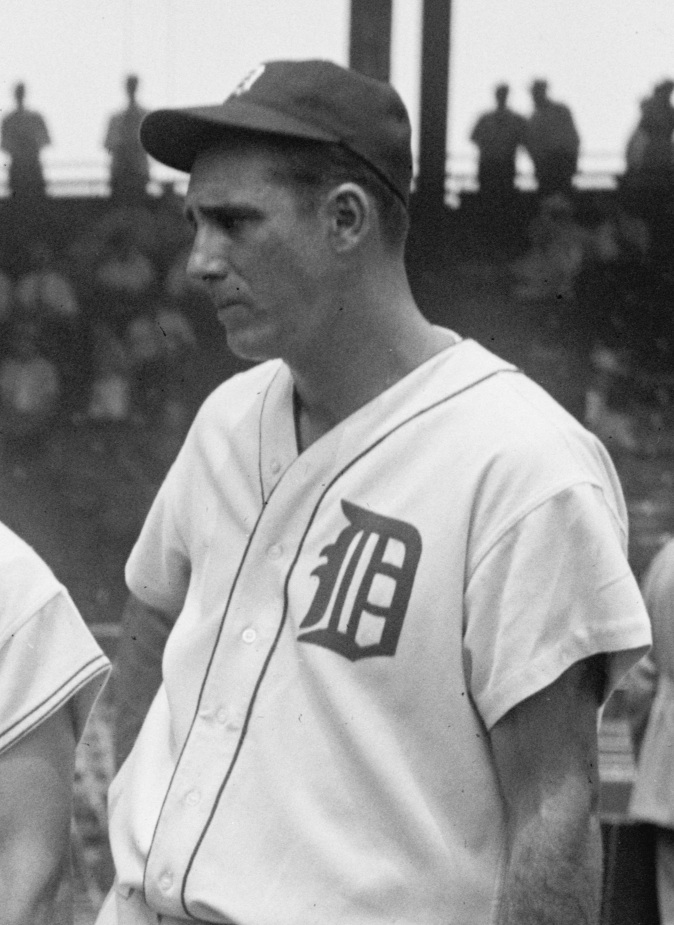
Hank Greenberg, Hall of Famer and 2-time MVP

Player	Team	RBIs	Season
Hack Wilson	Chicago Cubs	191	1930
Lou Gehrig	New York Yankees	184	1931
Hank Greenberg	Detroit Tigers	183	1937
Jimmie Foxx	Boston Red Sox	175	1938
Lou Gehrig	New York Yankees	175	1927

=== Hitting streak ===
Player	Team	Streak	Season
Joe DiMaggio	New York Yankees	56	1941
Willie Keeler	Baltimore Orioles	44	1897
Pete Rose	Cincinnati Reds	44	1978
Bill Dahlen	Chicago Colts	42	1894
George Sisler	St. Louis Browns	41	1922
Ty Cobb	Detroit Tigers	40	1911

=== Runs scored ===
Player	Team	Runs	Season
Billy Hamilton	Philadelphia Phillies	198	1894
Babe Ruth	New York Yankees	177	1921
Lou Gehrig	New York Yankees	167	1936
Lou Gehrig	New York Yankees	163	1931
Babe Ruth	New York Yankees	163	1928
Chuck Klein	Philadelphia Phillies	158	1930

=== Doubles ===
Player	Team	Doubles	Season
Earl Webb	Boston Red Sox	67	1931
George Burns	Cleveland Indians	64	1926
Joe Medwick	St. Louis Cardinals	64	1936
Hank Greenberg	Detroit Tigers	63	1934
Paul Waner	Pittsburgh Pirates	62	1932

=== Triples ===
Player	Team	Triples	Season
Chief Wilson	Pittsburgh Pirates	36	1912
Sam Crawford	Detroit Tigers	26	1914
Kiki Cuyler	Pittsburgh Pirates	26	1925
Joe Jackson	Cleveland Naps	26	1912

=== At bats ===
Player	Team	At bats	Season
Jimmy Rollins	Philadelphia Phillies	716	2007
Willie Wilson	Kansas City Royals	705	1980
Ichiro Suzuki	Seattle Mariners	704	2004
Juan Samuel	Philadelphia Phillies	701	1984
Dave Cash	Philadelphia Phillies	699	1975
Juan Pierre	Chicago Cubs	699	2006

=== Stolen bases ===
Player	Team	Stolen bases	Season
Hugh Nicol	Cincinnati Red Stockings	138	1887
Rickey Henderson	Oakland Athletics	130	1982
Arlie Latham	St. Louis Browns	129	1887
Lou Brock	St. Louis Cardinals	118	1974
Charlie Comiskey	St. Louis Browns	117	1887

== Pitching records ==
=== Overview ===
Record	Player	#	Season
Most wins	Old Hoss Radbourn	60	1884
Most losses	John Coleman	48	1883
Lowest E.R.A.	Eugene Bremer	0.711	1937
Most strikeouts	Matt Kilroy	513	1886
Most shutouts	George Bradley; Pete Alexander	16	1876; 1916
Most innings pitched	Will White	680	1879
Most complete games	Will White	75	1879
Lowest WHIP	Hilton Smith	.6176	1944
Most saves	Francisco Rodríguez	62	2008
Highest win/loss percentage	Roy Face	94.7%	1959
Most hits allowed	John Coleman	772	1883
Most earned runs allowed	John Coleman	291	1883
Fastest pitch thrown	Aroldis Chapman	105.8 mph	2010
Fastest pitch for strikeout	Ben Joyce	105.5 mph	2024

==== Live-ball era (1920–present) ====
(if different from above)

Record	Player	#	Season
Most wins	Jim Bagby, Sr. Lefty Grove; Denny McLain	31	1920; 1931; 1968
Most losses	Paul Derringer	27	1933
Most strikeouts	Nolan Ryan	383	1973
Most shutouts	Bob Gibson	13	1968
Most innings pitched	Wilbur Wood	376.2	1972
Most complete games	Bob Feller	36	1946
Most hits allowed	Wilbur Wood	381	1973
Most earned runs allowed	Bobo Newsom	186	1938

=== Wins ===
==== Post 19th Century ====
Player	Team	Wins	Season
Jack Chesbro	New York Yankees	41	1904
Ed Walsh	Chicago White Sox	40	1908
Christy Mathewson	New York Giants	37	1908
Walter Johnson	Washington Senators	36	1913
Joe McGinnity	New York Giants	35	1904

==== Live-ball era (post-1920) ====
Player	Team	Wins	Season
Jim Bagby, Sr.	Cleveland Indians	31	1920
Lefty Grove	Philadelphia Athletics	31	1931
Denny McLain	Detroit Tigers	31	1968
Dizzy Dean	St. Louis Cardinals	30	1934
Hal Newhouser	Detroit Tigers	29	1944
Dazzy Vance	Brooklyn Dodgers	28	1924
Lefty Grove	Philadelphia Athletics	28	1930
Dizzy Dean	St. Louis Cardinals	28	1935
Robin Roberts	Philadelphia Phillies	28	1952

=== Earned run average ===
Player	Team	ERA	Season
Gene Bremer	Cincinnati Tigers	0.711	1937
Satchel Paige	Kansas City Monarchs	0.719	1944
Hilton Smith	Kansas City Monarchs	0.794	1944

=== Strikeouts ===
Player	Team	Strikeouts	Season
Nolan Ryan	California Angels	383	1973
Sandy Koufax	Los Angeles Dodgers	382	1965
Randy Johnson	Arizona Diamondbacks	372	2001
Nolan Ryan	California Angels	367	1974
Randy Johnson	Arizona Diamondbacks	364	1999

=== Shutouts ===
Player	Team	Shutouts	Season
Pete Alexander	Philadelphia Phillies	16	1916
Bob Gibson	St. Louis Cardinals	13	1968
Jack Coombs	Philadelphia Athletics	13	1910
Pete Alexander	Philadelphia Phillies	12	1915

=== Saves ===
Player	Team	Saves	Season
Francisco Rodríguez	Los Angeles Angels	62	2008
Bobby Thigpen	Chicago White Sox	57	1990
Edwin Díaz	Seattle Mariners	57	2018
John Smoltz	Atlanta Braves	55	2002
Éric Gagné	Los Angeles Dodgers	55	2003

=== Balks ===
Player	Team	Balks	Season
Dave Stewart	Oakland Athletics	16	1988
John Dopson	Boston Red Sox	15	1989
Bob Welch	Oakland Athletics	13	1988
John Candelaria	New York Yankees	12	1988
Juan Guzmán	Texas Rangers	12	1988

=== Wild pitches ===
Player	Team	Wild pitches	Season
Red Ames	New York Giants	30	1905
Tony Cloninger	Atlanta Braves	27	1966
Larry Cheney	Chicago Cubs	26	1914
Juan Guzmán	Toronto Blue Jays	26	1993

== Catcher records ==
- Most runners caught stealing: Jody Davis, 89 (1986)
- Most stolen bases allowed: Mike Piazza, 155 (1996)
- Highest caught-stealing %: Mike LaValliere, 72.73% (1993)
- Most no-hitters caught: 2, Carlos Ruiz (2010) and Wilson Ramos (2015) (List of Major League Baseball no-hitters)

Both of Ruiz's no-hitters were by Roy Halladay; the second was in Game 1 of the National League Division Series, Halladay's first career postseason start. Both of Ramos' no-hitters were by Max Scherzer.

In 1914, Yankees catcher Les Nunamaker threw out three runners in the same inning.

== Team records ==
=== Hits ===
Team	Hits	Season
Philadelphia Phillies	1,783	1930

=== Home runs ===
Team	Home runs	Season
Minnesota Twins	307	2019
Atlanta Braves	307	2023
New York Yankees	306	2019
Houston Astros	288	2019
Los Angeles Dodgers	279	2019
New York Yankees	267	2018
Seattle Mariners	264	1997
Toronto Blue Jays	262	2021
Texas Rangers	260	2005
Toronto Blue Jays	257	2010
Baltimore Orioles	257	1996

=== Runs batted in ===
Team	Runs Batted In	Season
New York Yankees	995	1936

=== Runs scored ===
Team	Runs Scored	Season
New York Yankees	1,067	1931
