= Basilio Cueria =

Cuban baseball player (born 1898)

- First baseman / Outfielder
- Born: June 14, 1898; Marianao, Cuba
- Died: May 8, 1959 (aged 60); New York, New York, U.S.
- Batted: Right Threw: Right

Negro league baseball debut
- 1921, for the All Cubans

Last appearance
- 1922, for the Cuban Stars (West)
- Stats at Baseball Reference

Teams
- All Cubans (1921); Cuban Stars (West) (1922)

Basilio Cueria Obrit (June 14, 1898 – May 8, 1959) was a Cuban first baseman and outfielder in the Negro leagues and Cuban League in the 1920s.

A native of Marianao, Cuba, Cueria made his Negro leagues debut in 1921 with the All Cubans. The following season, he played for the Cuban Stars (West). Cueria also played for the Marianao club in the Cuban League in 1922–1923. He died in New York City in 1959 at age 60.
