= Ralph McLeod =

American baseball player (1916–2007)

- Left fielder
- Born: October 19, 1916; West Quincy, Massachusetts, U.S.
- Died: April 27, 2007 (aged 90); Weymouth, Massachusetts, U.S.
- Batted: Left Threw: Left

MLB debut
- September 14, 1938, for the Boston Bees

Last MLB appearance
- October 1, 1938, for the Boston Bees

MLB statistics
- Batting average: .286
- Runs batted in: 0
- Home runs: 0
- Stats at Baseball Reference

Teams
- Boston Bees (1938)

Ralph Alton McLeod (October 19, 1916 – April 27, 2007) was an American left fielder in Major League Baseball who played briefly for the Boston Bees late in the 1938 season. Listed at 6 ft 0 in (1.83 m), 170 lb., he batted and threw left-handed.

A native of Quincy, Massachusetts, McLeod was called up to the majors by the Boston Bees in September 1938. He collected his first hit, a single, off St. Louis Cardinals pitcher Paul Dean on September 21 –the same day the Hurricane of 1938 struck New England. During the off season he worked as a salesman at a department store, but his baseball career was cut short when he was drafted into the United States Army during World War II. In a six-game career, he was a .286 hitter (2-for-7), including one double and one run scored.

McLeod served as an infantryman for five years and fought in the Battle of the Bulge. After being discharged, he worked as a firefighter in his native Quincy for 32 years until his retirement in 1980. McLeod died in Weymouth, Massachusetts, at the age of 90.
