= Butch Sutcliffe =

American baseball player (1915-1994)

- Catcher
- Born: July 22, 1915; Fall River, Massachusetts, U.S.
- Died: March 2, 1994 (aged 78); Fall River, Massachusetts, U.S.
- Batted: Right Threw: Right

MLB debut
- August 28, 1938, for the Boston Bees

Last MLB appearance
- September 11, 1938, for the Boston Bees

MLB statistics
- Batting average: .250
- Home runs: 0
- Runs batted in: 2
- Stats at Baseball Reference

Teams
- Boston Bees (1938)

Charles Inigo Sutcliffe (July 22, 1915 – March 2, 1994) was an American Major League Baseball player. He played one season with the Boston Bees in 1938.
