= Joe Walsh (shortstop) =

American baseball player (1917–1996)

Joe "Tweet" Walsh
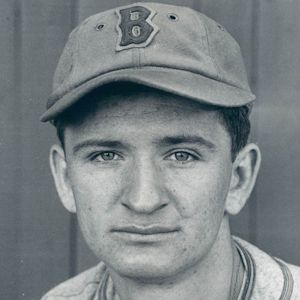
- Shortstop
- Born: March 13, 1917; Boston, Massachusetts, U.S.
- Died: October 5, 1996 (aged 79); Boston, Massachusetts, U.S.
- Batted: Right Threw: Right

Major League Baseball debut
- July 1, 1938, for the Boston Bees

Last Major League Baseball appearance
- July 3, 1938, for the Boston Bees

MLB statistics
- Games played: 4
- At bats: 8
- Hits: 0
- Stats at Baseball Reference

Teams
- Danville-Schoolfield Leafs (1936); Rocky Mount Red Sox (1937); Boston Bees (1938); Evansville Bees (1939); Toronto Maple Leafs (1939); Hartford Bees (1940); Bridgeport Bees (1941); Reading Brooks (1941)

Joseph "Tweet" Patrick Walsh (March 13, 1917 – October 5, 1996) was an American professional minor and Major League Baseball player. Walsh played shortstop from 1936 to 1941 and compiled a batting average of .284 with 21 home runs in his 235-game career.

== Early life ==
Walsh a native of Roxbury, Massachusetts, graduated from Brookline High School in 1934. Walsh's twin brother Eddie, was also considered a rising young ball player. Steven Goldman reported that as a child, Walsh had an exchange with Bob Quinn Owner of the Boston Red Sox. Walsh shouted at Quinn ‘‘Hey you! Why doncha go get a ball team.’’ Quinn who recognized Walsh as a frequent visitor to Fenway Park stated ‘‘I know you, young man, and you’ll never get into this park again!’’ The next time Walsh encountered Quinn was as a member of the Boston Bees when Quinn was President and part owner of the Boston Bees/Braves. Walsh never played a game at Fenway Park.

== Minor league career ==
In 1936 Walsh played for the Red Sox affiliate Danville-Schoolfield Leafs in the 1936 Bi-State League batting .295 and 7 home runs. In 1937 he played 136 games for the Red Sox affiliate Rocky Mount Red Sox in the Piedmont League batting .297 and 14 home runs.

In 1939 Walsh spent time with the Boston Bees affiliate Evansville Bees in the Class B Illinois-Iowa-Indiana League appearing in no games prior to being assigned to the AA Toronto Maple Leafs club in the International League in Ontario appearing in 2 games. In 1940, Walsh was on the Class A Boston Bees affiliate Hartford Bees in the Eastern League batting .198 in 32 games. In 1941, Walsh played for the Class B Boston Braves affiliate Bridgeport Bees in the Inter-State League and then the Brooklyn Dodgers affiliate Reading Brooks in the Inter-State League where he combined to play 103 games batting .277 with 4 home runs.

== Major league career ==
Walsh was selected by the Boston Bees from Boston Red Sox in the Rule 5 major league draft on October 5, 1937. Walsh spent 1938 spring training camp with the Boston Bees in Bradenton Florida where he suffered a career-altering injury before the end of the training season. Walsh was one of the youngest players in the National League when he appeared over the 4th of July weekend in 4 games at Braves Field for the 1938 Boston Bees against the Philadelphia Phillies and the New York Giants. He had 8 at bats with 2 strikeouts and no hits. Walsh wore number 29 with the Bees. This was Walsh's only Major League appearance.

Walsh died in Boston, Massachusetts in 1996. He is buried in Walnut Hills Cemetery in Brookline, Massachusetts.
