= Tom Kane (baseball) =

American baseball player

- Second baseman
- Born: December 15, 1906; Chicago, Illinois, U.S.
- Died: November 26, 1973 (aged 66); Chicago, Illinois, U.S.
- Batted: Right Threw: Right

MLB debut
- August 3, 1938, for the Boston Bees

Last MLB appearance
- August 13, 1938, for the Boston Bees

MLB statistics
- Batting average: .000
- Home runs: 0
- Runs batted in: 0
- Stats at Baseball Reference

Teams
- Boston Bees (1938)

Thomas Joseph Kane (December 15, 1906 – November 26, 1973), nicknamed "Sugar", was an American professional baseball player. He was a second baseman for one season (1938) with the Boston Bees. For his career, he collected no hits in two at-bats with two walks in two games.

He was born and later died in Chicago at the age of 66.
