= Bob Kahle =

American baseball player (1915–1988)

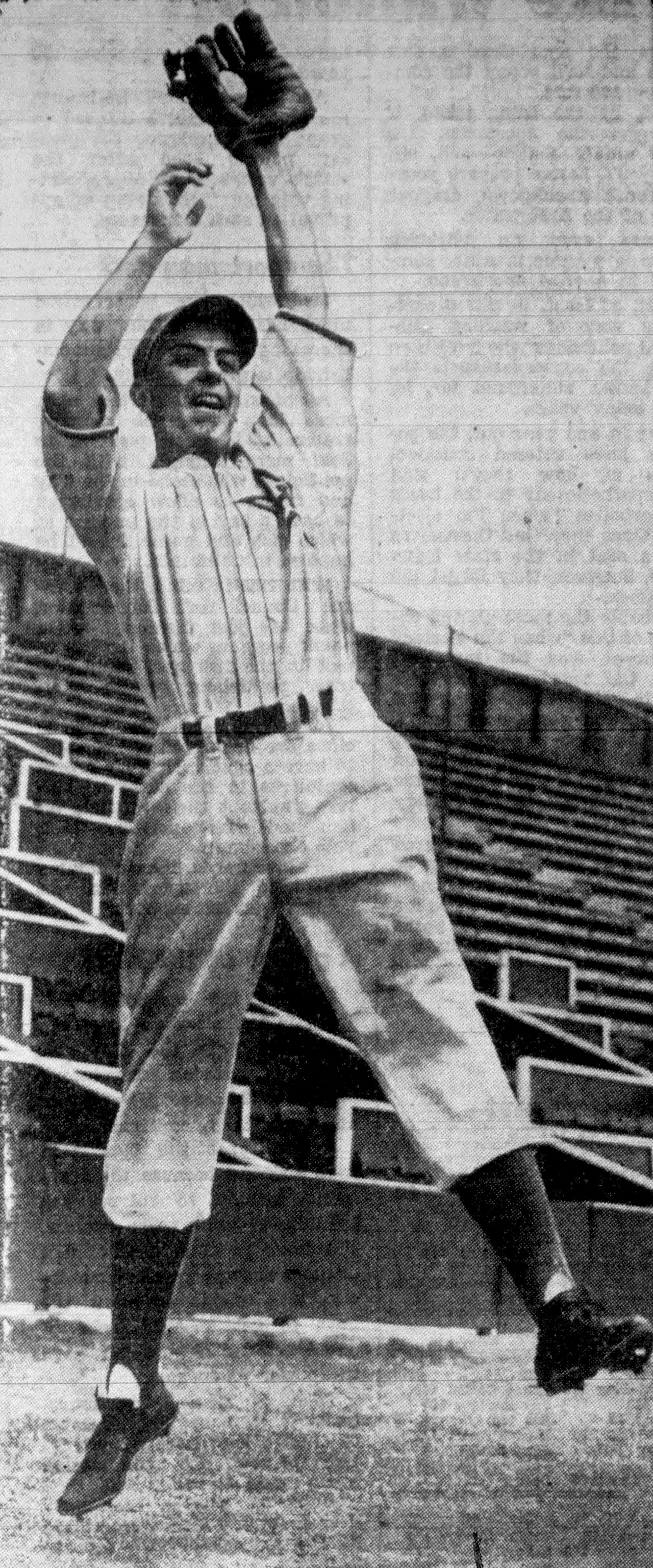
- Kahle, circa 1942
- Third baseman / Pinch runner
- Born: November 23, 1915; New Castle, Indiana, U.S.
- Died: December 16, 1988 (aged 73); Inglewood, California, U.S.
- Batted: Right Threw: Right

MLB debut
- April 21, 1938, for the Boston Bees

Last MLB appearance
- June 22, 1938, for the Boston Bees

MLB statistics
- Batting average: .333
- Home runs: 0
- Runs batted in: 0
- Stats at Baseball Reference

Teams
- Boston Bees (1938)

Robert Wayne Kahle (November 23, 1915 – December 16, 1988) was an American Major League Baseball player. He played one season with the Boston Bees from April 21 to June 22, 1938.
