= North Reading High School =

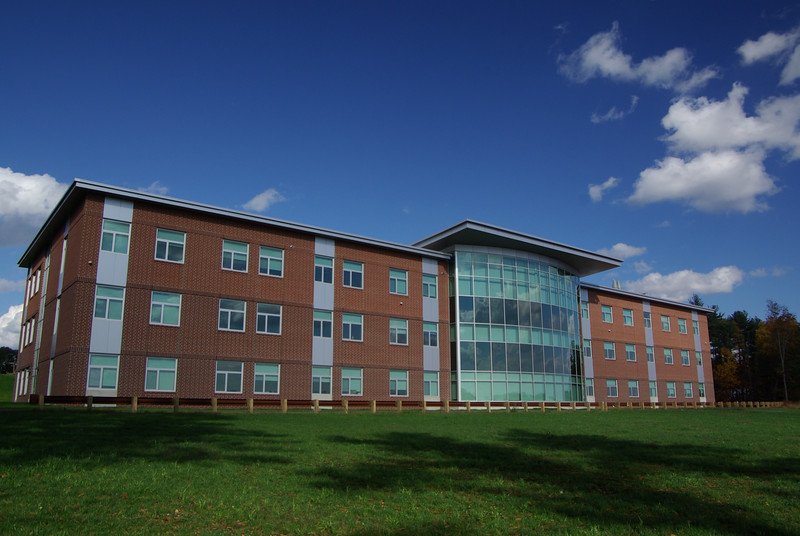

Location
- 189 Park Street; North Reading, MA 01864; United States; 42°34′25.96″N 71°05′00.82″W

Information
- Type: Public
- Established: 1955 / 2015
- Principal: Miriam Meyer
- Teaching staff: 64.46 (FTE)
- Grades: 9–12
- Enrollment: 652 (2024-2025)
- Student to teacher ratio: 10.11
- Campus: Suburban
- Colors: Green and gold
- Athletics conference: Cape Ann League (CAL)
- Mascot: Hornet
- Rival: Lynnfield High School
- Newspaper: The Deliberator (defunct)
- Website: nrhs.north-reading.k12.ma.us

North Reading High School (NRHS) is the public high school serving students in grades 9–12 from the town of North Reading, Massachusetts, United States. It has an enrollment of 644 students as of the 2022-2023 school year with a pupil-teacher ratio of about 10:1. The school has 62 full- and part-time faculty and staff, several of whom are NRHS graduates. The current principal is Miriam Meyer; the current assistant principal is BarriAnn Alonzo.

NRHS was voted one of the top 50 public high schools in Massachusetts in 2013 and 2015 by U.S. News & World Report. It failed to make the same publication's rankings in 2014.

== Construction ==
In 2012, the secondary schools building committee and the citizens of North Reading, in overwhelming support, voted to begin the creation of a combined high school/middle school facility. With the help of state and local funding, construction began on the new school in the fall of the same year.

The structure began to take shape just above and behind the 1955 high school building. In the fall of 2014, the first phase of construction was complete: the new high school building went into use while the old high school building, down the hill, received one final year as a temporary home for middle school students. The 2014–2015 school year saw the overhaul and renovation of the old middle school building next to the newly completed high school.

In the fall of 2015, the building project was considered to be complete. Students in grades 6–12 entered permanent classrooms in the middle school, the high school, and the shared common area. By the winter of 2015, the 1955 high school was completely demolished, and new athletic fields had taken its place.

The new facility consists of a completely new high school, a completely renovated middle school, and a shared common area linking those two institutions. This common area includes a two-court gymnasium, cafeteria, state-of-the-art performing arts center, and television studio. New tennis courts, softball fields, and an all-purpose field complete the project.

As one, the North Reading Middle-High School campus serves 1,370 students.

The school was designed by architectural company Dore & Whittier and constructed by Gilbane Building Company.

== Extracurriculars ==
North Reading High School has athletic, academic, and artistic extracurricular activities in which students can participate.

=== Athletic teams ===
- Baseball
- Basketball
- Cheerleading
- Cross Country
- Field Hockey
- Football
- Golf
- Gymnastics
- Ice Hockey
- Indoor Track
- Outdoor Track
- Lacrosse
- Soccer
- Softball
- Swimming
- Tennis
- Ultimate Frisbee
- Volleyball
- Wrestling

=== Academic/social/philanthropic clubs ===
- Academic Decathlon
- Adventure Club
- American Red Cross Club
- Chess Club
- Eco-team
- Future Business Leaders of America (FBLA)
- Gay-Straight Alliance (GSA)
- Interact Club
- International Travel Club
- Mock Trial Club
- Model United Nations Club
- National Honor Society
- Regional Student Advisory Committee
- Samantha's Harvest
- Social Activism Club
- Student Advisory to the North Reading School Committee
- Student Book Discussion Group
- Student Council
- Student Leadership Academy and Mentoring (SLAM)
- Students Against Destructive Decisions (SADD)
- World of Sciences Club
- Yearbook Committee

=== Artistic organizations ===
- Art Club
- Color Guard
- Jazz Band
- Marching Band
- Noteorious a Cappella
- Photography Club
- Stage Band
- Masquers Theater program

=== The Masquers ===
The Masquers Club is North Reading High School's dramatic organization. Its funding is financially independent of its schools. The club was founded in 1968 and produces at least one fall play and one winter musical every season. Masquers garners local acclaim as an entirely student-run organization and participates in the METG drama festival annually. Its productions, actors, and crew have earned numerous titles including best actor, best actress, student director, technical excellence, and best-set design. The organization regularly sends alumni to top national universities including NYU Tisch, Carnegie Mellon, Ithaca College, and Boston Conservatory for theatrical performance and technical production.

== Controversy ==
In May 2014, the North Reading Police Department began investigations into the president of the Athletic Boosters Association John Norton after he mailed them a personal check to pay for a police detail hired to work a basketball tournament. In August, the North Reading School Board officially severed its ties with the Athletic Boosters organization, at the time giving no official reason. Norton was arraigned in October of the same year. He is charged with embezzlement of over $10,000 intended for students.

The School Committee has encouraged citizens not to continue donating to the Athletic Boosters, but the police have insisted that they believe the behavior to be isolated. In addition to the arraignment of Norton, NRPD issued a formal complaint to the Attorney General's Office about the Athletic Boosters' failure to register proper legal filings as a non-profit organization.

The Athletic Boosters, which was an independent club separate from other associations like the School Committee, Music Boosters, or Parents Association, is no longer in existence.

== Demographics ==
North Reading High School's predominant student ethnicity is Caucasian. Its male-female ratio is nearly 1:1.

Ethnicity	Percentage of Enrollment
Caucasian	94%
Asian/Pacific Islander	2%
Multiracial	2%
Hispanic	1%
Black, non-Hispanic	0.4%
Native American or Native Alaskan	0%
Native Hawaiian or Other Pacific Islander	0%

Gender	Enrolled
Male	379
Female	376
Other	Not measured

Subgroup	Percentage of Enrollment
Low-income	7.2%
Students with Disabilities	14%
Free Lunch	4.9%
Reduced Lunch	2.3%
High Needs	19.6%

== Notable alumni ==
- Jon Favreau (class of 1999), director of speechwriting for President Barack Obama, 2009–2013
