= Middle Atlantic League =

American former minor-league baseball league

- Most recent season or competition: 1951 Middle Atlantic League season
- Classification: Class C (1925–1942, 1946–1951)
- Sport: Baseball
- First season: 1925; 101 years ago
- Folded: 1951; 75 years ago
- President: Ray H. Archibald (1925); Elmer M. Daily (1926–1942, 1946–1951)
- No. of teams: 30
- Country: United States
- Most titles: 5 Erie Sailors
- Related competitions: Blue Ridge League; Central League; Pennsylvania State Association

The Middle Atlantic League (or Mid-Atlantic League) was a lower-level circuit in American minor league baseball that played during the second quarter of the 20th century.

== History ==
The Middle Atlantic League played from 1925 through 1951, pausing for three seasons (1943–45) when the league suspended operations during World War II. The league primarily featured clubs based in the U.S. states of Pennsylvania, Ohio, and West Virginia, although it had a team in Maryland and, in its final season, one in New York. Its longest-tenured team, the Johnstown Johnnies from Johnstown, Pennsylvania, played for 19 seasons. The final champions were the 1951 Niagara Falls Citizens.

Throughout its 24-year history, the Middle Atlantic League was designated by the National Association as a Class C level league, one level up from the lowest classification in the era, Class D.

Elmer M. Daily served as president of the Middle Atlantic League for the entirety of its 24 seasons of play.

== List of teams ==
- Akron, OH: Akron Yankees 1935–1941
- Altoona, PA: Altoona Engineers 1931
- Beaver Falls, PA: Beaver Falls Beavers 1931
- Beckley, WV: Beckley Black Knights 1931–1934; Beckley Miners 1935
- Butler, PA: Butler Yankees 1946–1947; Butler Tigers 1948–1951
- Canton, OH: Canton Terriers 1936–1942
- Charleroi, PA: Charleroi Babes 1927–1928; Charleroi Governors 1929–1931
- Charleston, WV: Charleston Senators 1931–1942
- Clarksburg, WV: Clarksburg Generals 1925–1932
- Cumberland, MD: Cumberland Colts 1925–1932, 1941–1942
- Dayton, OH: Dayton Ducks 1933–1938; Dayton Wings 1939–1940
- Erie, PA: Erie Sailors 1938–1939, 1941–1942,1946–1951
- Fairmont, WV: Fairmont Maroons 1925; Fairmont Black Diamonds 1926–1931
- Hagerstown, MD: Hagerstown Hubs 1931
- Huntington, WV: Huntington Boosters 1931–1933; Huntington Red Birds 1934–1936
- Jeannette, PA: Jeannette Jays 1926–1931
- Johnstown, PA: Johnstown Johnnies 1925–1938, 1946–1950
- Lockport, NY: Lockport Locks 1951
- New Castle, PA: New Castle Chiefs 1948; New Castle Nats 1949–1950; New Castle Indians 1951
- Niagara Falls, NY: Niagara Falls Frontiers 1946–1947; Niagara Falls Citizens 1950–1951
- Oil City, PA: Oil City Oilers 1946; Oil City Refiners 1947–1950; Oil City A's 1951
- Parkersburg, WV: Parkersburg Parkers 1931
- Portsmouth, OH: Portsmouth Pirates 1935–1936; Portsmouth Red Birds 1937–1940
- Scottdale, PA: Scottdale Scotties 1925–1930; Scottdale Cardinals 1931
- Springfield, OH: Springfield Chicks 1933; Springfield Pirates 1934; Springfield Indians 1937–1939; Springfield Cardinals 1941–1942
- Uniontown, PA: Uniontown Cokers 1926; Uniontown Coal Barons 1947–1949
- Vandergrift, PA: Vandergrift Pioneers 1947–1950
- Wheeling, WV: Wheeling Stogies 1925–1931, 1933–1934
- Youngstown, OH: Youngstown Tubers 1931; Youngstown Browns 1939–1941; Youngstown Gremlins 1946; Youngstown Colts 1947–1948; Youngstown Athletics 1949–1951
- Zanesville, OH: Zanesville Grays 1933–1937; Zanesville Cubs 1941–1942

== League champions ==
- 1925 - Johnstown Johnnies
- 1926 - Johnstown Johnnies -2
- 1927 - Cumberland Colts
- 1928 - Fairmont Black Diamonds
- 1929 - Charleroi Governors
- 1930 - Johnstown Johnnies -3
- 1931 - Cumberland Colts -2
- 1932 - Charleston Senators -2
- 1933 - Zanesville Grays
- 1934 - Zanesville Grays - 2
- 1935 - Huntington Red Birds
- 1936 - Zanesville Grays - 3
- 1937 - Canton Terriers
- 1938 - Portsmouth Red Birds
- 1939 - Canton Terriers -2
- 1940 - Akron Yankees
- 1941 - Erie Sailors
- 1942 - Erie Sailors -2
- 1943 - League shutdown due to World War II
- 1944 - League shutdown due to World War II
- 1945 - League shutdown due to World War II
- 1946 - Erie Sailors -3
- 1947 - Vandergrift Pioneers
- 1948 - Erie Sailors -4
- 1949 - Erie Sailors -5
- 1950 - Butler Tigers
- 1951 - Niagara Falls Citizens

== Standings & statistics ==
=== 1925 to 1930 ===
1925 Middle Atlantic League
schedule

Team standings	W	L	PCT	GB	Managers
Johnstown Johnnies	64	31	.674	-	Norm McNeill
Cumberland Colts	56	40	.583	8½	Tom Ray / Hank McEnroe; Jim McGuire
Clarksburg Cyrians/Ghosts	48	45	.516	15	Blake Lytle / Harry Shriver
Fairmont Maroons	47	53	.470	19½	Cy Perry / Ira Erret
Wheeling Stogies	39	62	.386	28	Art Rooney / Frank Eastley
Scottdale Scotties	18	41	.305	NA	Joe Brahaney

Scottdale joined league July 12.

Player statistics
Player	Team	Stat	Tot	Player	Team	Stat	Tot
Mike Martineck	Johnstown	BA	.372	John Schmutte	Johnstown	W	19
Art Rooney	Wheeling	Runs	109	Charles Harkins	Clarksburg	SO	123
Art Rooney	Wheeling	Hits	143	Paul Secrist	Cumberland	Pct	.909; 10–1
Mike Martineck	Johnstown	HR	18				
Art Rooney	Wheeling	SB	58				

1926 Middle Atlantic League
schedule

Team standings	W	L	PCT	GB	Managers
Fairmont Diamonds	68	44	.607	-	Joe Phillips
Johnstown Johnnies	63	43	.594	2	Norm McNeill
Cumberland Colts	62	48	.564	5	Pat Ragan
Clarksburg Generals	56	51	.523	9½	Harry Shriver / Bill Pike
Scottdale Scotties	51	61	.455	17	Mike Mowrey
Uniontown Cokers	47	61	.435	19	Tommy Ray / Jim McGuire; Lee King / John Bail
Jeannette Jays	45	64	.413	21½	Jack Snyder / Warwick Comstock
Wheeling Stogies	44	64	.407	22	Eddie Lennox / John Hummel

Playoff: Johnstown 4 games, Fairmont 2.

Player statistics
Player	Team	Stat	Tot	Player	Team	Stat	Tot
Denny Sothern	Cumberland	BA	.374	Arthur Cousins	Fairmont	W	21
Edward Sobb	Clarksburg	Runs	113	Buck Hopkins	Scottdale	SO	193
Dewey Stover	Clarksburg	Hits	152	Arthur Cousins	Fairmont	Pct	.750; 21–7
Jack Smith	Uniontown	HR	28				

1927 Middle Atlantic League

Team standings	W	L	PCT	GB	Managers
Cumberland Colts	66	47	.584	-	Guy Thompson
Fairmont Black Diamonds	64	50	.561	2½	Joe Phillips
Clarksburg Generals	63	55	.534	5½	Greasy Neale
Wheeling Stogies	59	55	.518	7½	Bobby Prysock
Scottdale Scotties	57	54	.514	8	Moose Marshall
Johnstown Johnnies	57	55	.509	8½	Babe Adams / Chief Bender
Jeannette Jays	48	65	.425	18	Jim Ferguson / Lee Strait; Elmer Knetzer
Charleroi Babes	42	75	.359	26	John McIlvain / Warwick Comstock

Playoff: Cumberland 4 games, Johnstown 2.

Player statistics
Player	Team	Stat	Tot	Player	Team	Stat	Tot
Karl Weber	Wheeling	BA	.340	William Helmick	Fairmont	W	18
Edward Sobb	Clarksburg	Runs	74	Carl Fisher	Johnstown	SO	133
Karl Weber	Wheeling	Hits	155	Clral Gillenwater	Wheeling	ERA	1.66
Ed Conley	Cumberland	HR	16	Chuck Trader	Fairmont/Wheeling	PCT	.765 13–4

1928 Middle Atlantic League
schedule

Team standings	W	L	PCT	GB	Managers
Cumberland Colts	75	49	.605	-	Johnny Byrne
Fairmont Black Diamonds	70	51	.578	3½	Joe Phillips
Wheeling Stogies	68	52	.567	5	Bobby Prysock
Jeannette Jays	65	54	.546	7½	Lee Strait
Charleroi Babes	62	60	.508	12	Bill Phillips
Johnstown Johnnies	55	59	.482	15	Chief Bender / Claude Roth; Mike Thompson
Clarksburg Generals	42	76	.356	30	Moose Marshall / Webb Cashion; Greasy Neale
Scottdale Scotties	40	76	.345	31	Mike Flaherty

Playoff: Fairmont 4 games, Wheeling 2.

Player statistics
Player	Team	Stat	Tot	Player	Team	Stat	Tot
Bill Pritchard	Clarksburg/Wheeling	BA	.370	Joseph Drugmond	Charleroi	W	23
Ed Conley	Cumberland	Runs	99	Joseph Drugmond	Charleroi	SO	149
Dewey Stover	Clarksburg	Hits	165	Charles Herrell	Cumberland	ERA	2.23
Bob Holland	Fairmont	RBI	96	James Tennant	Cumberland	PCT	.857 12–2
Bob Holland	Fairmont	HR	20				

1929 Middle Atlantic League
schedule

Team standings	W	L	PCT	GB	Managers
Charleroi Governors	67	47	.587	-	Bob Rice
Wheeling Stogies	67	47	.587	-	Pat Haley
Cumberland Colts	65	53	.551	4	Johnny Byrne
Fairmont Black Diamonds	58	55	.513	8½	Joe Phillips
Scottdale Scotties	57	58	.496	10½	Eddie Dyer
Clarksburg Generals	53	63	.457	15	Chap Marable
Jeannette Jays	50	66	.431	18	Lee Strait / Leo Hanley
Johnstown Johnnies	44	72	.379	24	Norm McNeil / Marty Fielder

Playoff: Charleroi 4 games, Wheeling 1.

Player statistics
Player	Team	Stat	Tot	Player	Team	Stat	Tot
Fred Lucas	Charleroi	BA	.407	Irvin Rase	Cumberland	W	22
George Durning	Cumberland	Runs	96	Clarence Heise	Scottdale	SO	154
Fred Lucas	Charleroi	Hits	178	Irvin Rase	Cumberland	ERA	2.63
Fred Lucas	Charleroi	RBI	113	Mike Ryba	Scottdale	PCT	.909 10–1
Fred Lucas	Charleroi	HR	21				
Moose Solters	Fairmont	HR	21				
Jimmy Ripple	Jeanette	3B	24				

1930 Middle Atlantic League
schedule

Team standings	W	L	PCT	GB	Managers
Johnstown Johnnies	64	53	.547	-	Wilbur Good
Clarksburg Generals	64	53	.547	-	Greasy Neale
Fairmont Black Diamonds	61	55	.526	2½	Del Gainer / Tony Cyran; Jim Walsh
Scottdale Scotties	59	55	.518	3½	Eddie Dyer
Charleroi Governors	58	57	.504	5	Dave Lamb
Cumberland Colts	59	59	.500	5½	Joe Phillips
Wheeling Stogies	50	65	.435	13	Bobby Prysock / Dan Tapson
Jeannette Jays	49	67	.422	14½	Dan Pasquella

Playoff: Johnstown 4 games, Clarksburg 3.

Player statistics
Player	Team	Stat	Tot	Player	Team	Stat	Tot
Joe Medwick	Scottdale	BA	.419	Red Proctor	Clarksburg	W	24
Sam Thomas	Johnstown	Runs	125	Ed Chapman	Scottdale	SO	207
Frank Doljack	Wheeling	Hits	176	Cecil Slaughter	Fairmont	ERA	3.23
Hal Stricklin	Charleroi	RBI	108	Tommy Thompson	Johnstown	PCT	.720 18–7
Hal Stricklin	Charleroi	HR	31				

=== 1931 to 1936 ===
1931 Middle Atlantic League
schedule

Team standings	W	L	PCT	GB	Managers
Charleston Senators	82	44	.651	-	Dick Hoblitzel
Cumberland Colts	82	46	.641	1	Leo Mackey
Beckley Black Knights	81	49	.623	3	Frank Welch
Scottdale Cardinals	78	55	.586	7½	Clay Hopper
Johnstown Johnnies	73	54	.575	9½	Wilbur Good
Huntington Boosters	68	62	.523	16	Dennis Stuart
Fairmont Black Diamonds	65	60	.520	16½	Jimmy Walsh / Tony Cyran
Clarksburg Generals	66	63	.512	17½	Red Proctor
Hagerstown Hubs / Parkersburg Parkers / Youngstown Tubers	56	65	.463	23½	Joe Cambria
Wheeling Stogies	50	77	.394	32½	Dan Tapson / Pat Haley
Charleroi Governors	30	92	.246	50	Bill Phillips / Benny Arrigiani; Joe Fillingham
Jeannette Jays / Altoona Engineers / Beaver Falls Beavers	32	96	.250	51	Joe Phillips / Kemp Wicker

Jeanette (1-11) moved to Altoona May 23; Altoona moved to Beaver Falls July 18; Hagerstown (27-22) moved to Parkersburg June 28; Parkersburg (9-5) moved to Youngstown July 12.
Playoff: Cumberland 4 games, Charleston 2.

Player statistics
Player	Team	Stat	Tot	Player	Team	Stat	Tot
Babe Phelps	Youngstown	BA	.408	Edward Marleau	Charleston	W	23
Sam Thomas	Johnstown	Runs	122	Bill Lee	Scottdale	SO	256
Babe Phelps	Youngstown	Hits	178	Vito Tamulis	Cumberland	ERA	1.93
Bill Pritchard	Johnstown	RBI	125	William Helmick	Cumberland	PCT	.818 18–4
Frank Welch	Beckley	HR	38				

1932 Middle Atlantic League
schedule

Team standings	W	L	PCT	GB	Managers
Charleston Senators	70	54	.565	-	Danny Boone
Beckley Black Knights	70	54	.565	-	Frank Welch / Cat Milner
Johnstown Johnnies	66	59	.528	4½	Karl Weber
Cumberland Colts	62	60	.508	7	Leo Mackey
Clarksburg Generals	60	66	.476	11	Frank Walker / Herbert Smith
Huntington Boosters	45	80	.360	25½	Johnny Stuart

Playoff: Charlestown 4 games, Beckley 2.

Player statistics
Player	Team	Stat	Tot	Player	Team	Stat	Tot
Fred Sington	Beckley	BA	.368	Carl Spencer	Clarksburg	W	18
Fred Sington	Beckley	Runs	110	Wayne LaMaster	Charleston	SO	177
Lou Chiozza	Beckley	Runs	110	Wayne LaMaster	Charleston	ERA	2.27
Lou Chiozza	Beckley	Hits	187	Joe Martin	Charleston	PCT	.842 16–3
Fred Sington	Beckley	RBI	110				
Fred Sington	Beckley	HR	29				

1933 Middle Atlantic League
schedule

Team standings	W	L	PCT	GB	Managers
Wheeling Stogies	78	55	.586	-	Jack Sheehan
Zanesville Grays	76	59	.563	3	Johnny Walker / Buzz Wetzel; Harry Layne / Bert Grimm
Dayton Ducks	71	63	.530	7½	Ducky Holmes
Springfield Chicks	67	64	.511	10	Jake Pitler
Charleston Senators	67	67	.500	11½	Danny Boone / Watt Powell
Johnstown Johnnies	67	67	.500	11½	Karl Weber / Leo Mackey
Beckley Black Knights	63	71	.470	15½	Eli Harris
Huntington Boosters	46	89	.341	33	Johnny Stuart / Earl Smith; Bernie Neis / Rube Benton

Playoff: Zanesville 4 games, Wheeling 1.

Player statistics
Player	Team	Stat	Tot	Player	Team	Stat	Tot
Pepper Barry	Johnstown	BA	.361	Rex McDonald	Springfield	W	19
Eddie Wilson	Springfield	Runs	112	Al Milnar	Zanesville	SO	194
Pepper Barry	Johnstown	Hits	194	Kemp Wicker	Wheeling	ERA	2.00
Mickey Ballande	Zanesville	RBI	96	Harry Swain; Kemp Wicker	Johnstown; Wheeling	PCT	.700 14–6
Mickey Noonan	Springfield	HR	26				

1934 Middle Atlantic League
schedule

Team standings	W	L	PCT	GB	Managers
Zanesville Grays	72	51	.585	-	Buzz Wetzel / Harry Layne; Bert Grimm / Earl Wolgamot
Dayton Ducks	71	54	.568	2	Ducky Holmes
Huntington Red Birds	69	53	.566	2½	Eddie Dyer
Beckley Black Knights	65	57	.533	6½	Milt Stock
Johnstown Johnnies	62	62	.500	10½	Guy Sturdy / Vernon Mackie
Springfield Pirates	57	65	.467	14½	Al DeVormer / Rube Bressler
Charleston Senators	55	67	.451	16½	Charles Neibergall
Wheeling Stogies	39	81	.325	31½	Jack Sheehan

Playoff: Zanesville 4 games, Dayton 3.

Player statistics
Player	Team	Stat	Tot	Player	Team	Stat	Tot
Vernon Mackie	Johnstown	BA	.365	Wayne LaMaster	Charleston	W	17
Sam Thomas	Johnstown	Runs	123	Roger Wolff	Dayton	W	17
Arnold Anderson	Huntington	Hits	174	Wayne LaMaster	Charleston	SO	168
Vernon Mackie	Johnstown	RBI	94	Earl Cook	Beckley	ERA	2.48
Mickey Noonan	Springfield	HR	17	James Minogue	Zanesville	PCT	.765 13–4
Johnny McCarthy	Dayton	HR	17				

1935 Middle Atlantic League
schedule

Team standings	W	L	PCT	GB	Managers
Zanesville Grays	70	54	.565	-	Earl Wolgamot
Dayton Ducks	69	55	.556	1	Ducky Holmes / Riley Parker
Johnstown Johnnies	67	56	.545	2½	Joe O'Rourke / Jack Quinn; Leo Mackey
Akron Yankees	64	59	.520	5½	Johnny Neun
Huntington Red Birds	60	58	.508	7	Benny Borgmann
Portsmouth Pirates	54	63	.462	12½	Jake Pitler
Charleston Senators	49	65	.430	16	Russ Young / Val Picinich
Beckley Miners	45	68	.398	19½	Ralph McAdams / Robert Rawlins

Playoff: Huntington 4 games, Dayton 2.

Player statistics
Player	Team	Stat	Tot	Player	Team	Stat	Tot
Jimmy Wasdell	Zanesville	BA	.357	Mike Martynik	Huntington	W	21
Jim Gruzdis	Huntington	Runs	111	Mike Martynik	Huntington	SO	299
Jimmy Wasdell	Zanesville	Hits	182	Mike Martynik	Huntington	ERA	2.63
Milt McIntyre	Zanesville	RBI	110				
Milt McIntyre	Zanesville	HR	24				
Benny Borgmann	Huntington	SB	35				

1936 Middle Atlantic League
schedule

Team standings	W	L	PCT	GB	Managers
Zanesville Grays	81	48	.628	-	Earl Wolgamot
Charleston Senators	71	58	.550	10	Ignatius Walters
Dayton Ducks	70	59	.543	11	Ducky Holmes
Canton Terriers	68	59	.535	12	Floyd Patterson
Akron Yankees	64	63	.504	16	Nick Allen
Huntington Red Birds	60	69	.465	21	Benny Borgmann
Johnstown Johnnies	59	69	.461	21½	Wilbur Good / Dutch Dorman
Portsmouth Pirates	40	88	.313	40½	Eddie Kenna

Playoff: Zanesville 2 games, Dayton 1, for the second half and league championships.

Player statistics
Player	Team	Stat	Tot	Player	Team	Stat	Tot
Barney McCosky	Charleston	BA	.400	Tommy Reis	Zanesville	W	21
Oscar Grimes	Zanesville	Runs	150	Mike Martynik	Huntington	SO	226
Jeff Heath	Zanesville	Hits	208	John Haley	Canton	ERA	2.63
Jeff Heath	Zanesville	RBI	187	Tommy Reis	Zanesville	PCT	.700 21–9
Walter Alston	Huntington	HR	35				

=== 1937 to 1942 ===
1937 Middle Atlantic League
schedule

Team standings	W	L	PCT	GB	Managers
Canton Terriers	81	46	.591	-	Floyd Patterson
Springfield Indians	81	47	.587	½	Earl Wolgamot
Portsmouth Red Birds	72	57	.558	10	Benny Borgmann
Akron Yankees	64	61	.512	16	Leo Mackey
Dayton Ducks	61	65	.484	19½	Ducky Holmes
Charleston Senators	60	66	.476	20½	Ignatius Walters
Johnstown Johnnies	52	74	.413	28½	Jack Fournier
Zanesville Grays	33	88	.273	45	Possum Whitted

Playoff: Akron 3 games, Springfield 1; Canton 3 games, Portsmouth 1.
Finals: Canton 3 games, Akron 2.

Player statistics
Player	Team	Stat	Tot	Player	Team	Stat	Tot
Skeeter Scalzi	Springfield	BA	.377	Bill Kerksieck	Canton	W	24
Skeeter Scalzi	Springfield	Runs	147	Lee Sherrill	Portsmouth	SO	274
Skeeter Scalzi	Springfield	Hits	197	Bob Katz	Canton	ERA	2.73
Marvin Pelton	Portsmouth	RBI	114	Ken Jungels	Springfield	PCT	.840 21–4
Skeeter Scalzi	Springfield	HR	34				

1938 Middle Atlantic League
schedule

Team standings	W	L	PCT	GB	Managers
Portsmouth Red Birds	79	50	.612	-	Benny Borgmann
Canton Terriers	79	51	.608	½	Floyd Patterson
Springfield Indians	71	59	.546	8½	Earl Wolgamot
Akron Yankees	66	62	.516	12½	Pip Koehler
Charleston Senators	59	67	.468	18½	Paul O'Malley
Dayton Ducks	58	72	.446	21½	Red Rollings / Ducky Holmes; Jim Lindsey
Erie Sailors	52	75	.409	26	Jocko Munch
Johnstown Johnnies	50	78	.391	28½	Bobby Goff

Playoff: Akron 3 games, Canton 0; Portsmouth 3 games, Springfield 1.
Finals: Portsmouth 4 games, Akron 3.
Most Valuable Player: Frankie Silvanic, Akron

Player statistics
Player	Team	Stat	Tot	Player	Team	Stat	Tot
Whitey Kurowski	Portsmouth	BA	.386	Tex Hughson	Canton	W	22
Whitey Kurowski	Portsmouth	Runs	133	Vearal Puckett	Canton	SO	188
Whitey Kurowski	Portsmouth	Hits	209	Jep Jefferson	Johnstown	SO	188
Chet Wieczorek	Portsmouth	RBI	130	James Morris	Charleston	ERA	275
Frankie Silvanic	Akron	HR	35	Tex Hughson	Canton	PCT	.759 22–7

1939 Middle Atlantic League
schedule

Team standings	W	L	PCT	GB	Managers
Canton Terriers	77	52	.597	-	Floyd Patterson
Charleston Senators	70	60	.538	7½	Edward Hall
Akron Yankees	69	61	.531	8½	Pip Koehler
Springfield Indians	66	64	.508	11½	Earl Wolgamot
Portsmouth Red Birds	61	69	.469	16½	Joe Davis
Dayton Wings	60	69	.465	17	Dud Lee / Andy Cohen
Youngstown Browns	60	70	.462	17½	Billy Urbanski
Erie Sailors	55	73	.430	21½	Jocko Munch

Playoff: Canton 3 games, Akron 1; Springfield 3 games, Charleston 1.
Finals: Canton 4 games, Springfield 1.

Player statistics
Player	Team	Stat	Tot	Player	Team	Stat	Tot
Ed Murphy	Portsmouth	BA	.375	Robert Waugh	Akron	W	20
Frank Genovese	Canton	Runs	113	Max Surkont	Portsmouth	SO	193
Peter Kraus	Youngstown	Hits	172	Joe Davis	Portsmouth	ERA	2.49
Johnny Lazor	Canton	RBI	103	Ralph Waite	Canton	PCT	.792 19–5
Ed Murphy	Portsmouth	HR	22				

1940 Middle Atlantic League
schedule

Team standings	W	L	PCT	GB	Managers
Akron Yankees	73	54	.575	-	Pip Koehler
Charleston Senators	64	62	.508	8½	Ed Hall
Youngstown Browns	62	62	.500	9½	Rod Whitney
Dayton Wings	60	65	.480	12	Andy Cohen
Canton Terriers	58	65	.472	13	Floyd Patterson
Portsmouth Red Birds	59	68	.465	14	Dutch Dorman / Walter Alston

Playoff: Akron 3 games, Youngstown 2; Dayton 3 games, Charleston 1.
Finals: Akron 3 games, Dayton 2.

Player statistics
Player	Team	Stat	Tot	Player	Team	Stat	Tot
Ed Tighe	Akron	BA	.325	Clem Dreisewerd	Portsmouth	W	23
Tony Sams	Akron	Runs	109	Mel Queen	Akron	SO	202
Bob Dillinger	Youngstown	Runs	109	Bob Haas	Charleston	ERA	2.25
Tony Sams	Akron	Hits	163	Clem Dreisewerd	Portsmouth	PCT	.719 23–9
Bob Dillinger	Youngstown	Hits	163				
Jerry Witte	Youngstown	RBI	124				
Walter Alston	Portsmouth	HR	28				

1941 Middle Atlantic League
schedule

Team standings	W	L	PCT	GB	Managers
Akron Yankees	77	48	.616	-	Buzz Boyle
Erie Sailors	75	51	.595	2½	Kerby Farrell
Canton Terriers	71	54	.568	6	Floyd Patterson
Springfield Cardinals	69	57	.548	8½	Walter Alston
Charleston Senators	58	59	.496	15	Ed Hall
Dayton Ducks	50	75	.400	27	Ducky Holmes / Bill McWilliams
Youngstown Browns	49	75	.395	27½	Joe Bilgere / Len Schulte
Zanesville Cubs	43	73	.371	29½	Jackie Warner

Playoff: Erie 3 games, Springfield 0; Canton 3 games, Akron 2.
Finals: Erie 4 games, Canton 1.

Player statistics
Player	Team	Stat	Tot	Player	Team	Stat	Tot
Como Cotelle	Dayton/Erie	BA	.367	Lou Lucier	Canton	W	23
Walter Alston	Springfield	Runs	88	Lou Lucier	Canton	SO	199
Como Cotelle	Dayton/Erie	Hits	150	Lou Lucier	Canton	ERA	1.51
Walter Alston	Springfield	RBI	102	Lou Lucier	Canton	Pct	.821 23–5
Walter Alston	Springfield	HR	25				

1942 Middle Atlantic League
schedule

Team standings	W	L	PCT	GB	Managers
Charleston Senators	75	51	.595	-	Jack Knight
Dayton Ducks	74	53	.583	1½	Paul Chervinko / Ducky Holmes
Canton Terriers	68	61	.527	8½	Floyd Patterson
Erie Sailors	63	65	.492	13	Kirby Farrell
Springfield Cardinals	59	71	.454	18	Walter Alston
Zanesville Cubs	46	84	.354	31	Jackie Warner

Playoff: Canton 3 games, Charleston 0; Erie 3 games, Dayton 2.
Finals: Erie 4 games, Canton 0.

Player statistics
Player	Team	Stat	Tot	Player	Team	Stat	Tot
Como Cotelle	Erie	BA	.327	Bob Kuzava	Charleston	W	21
Sam Gentile	Canton	Runs	79	Jack Clifton	Canton	SO	170
Sam Gentile	Canton	Hits	149	Arnold Reichert	Dayton	ERA	1.50
Walter Alston	Springfield	RBI	90	Bob Kuzava	Charleston	PCT	.778 21–6
Walter Alston	Springfield	HR	12				

=== 1946 to 1951 ===
The league did not play in the 1943 to 1945 seasons due to World War II

1946 Middle Atlantic League
schedule

Team standings	W	L	PCT	GB	Managers
Erie Sailors	91	39	.700	-	Steve Mizerak
Butler Yankees	78	52	.600	13	Milt Rosner
Youngstown Gremlins	67	62	.519	23½	Paul Birch
Niagara Falls Frontiers	64	66	.492	27	George Proechel / Bill Mongiello
Johnstown Johnnies	49	80	.388	41½	Cyril Pfeifer
Oil City Oilers	40	90	.308	51	Charlie Muse / Charles Harig

Playoff: Erie 3 games, Youngstown 1; Niagara Falls 3 games, Butler 1.
Finals: Erie 4 games, Niagara Falls 3.

Player statistics
Player	Team	Stat	Tot	Player	Team	Stat	Tot
Cyril Pfeifer	Johnstown	BA	.344	John Uber	Erie	W	18
Victor Fucci	Butler	Runs	101	Bill Webb	Erie	W	18
Harry R. Anderson	Butler	Hits	159	John Uber	Erie	SO	192
Bill Behie	Butler	RBI	87	George Bamberger	Erie	ERA	1.35
Maurice Cunningham	Butler/Youngs	HR	14	John Kucab	Youngstown	PCT	.923 12–1

1947 Middle Atlantic League
schedule

Team standings	W	L	PCT	GB	Attend	Managers
Vandergrift Pioneers	76	46	.623	-	87,000	Floyd Patterson
Niagara Falls Frontiers	68	55	.553	8½	48,000	Steve Mizerak
Erie Sailors	68	56	.548	9	107,000	Don Cross
Butler Yankees	62	62	.500	15	56,000	Jack Warner
Oil City Refiners	61	63	.492	16	57,000	Charlie Engle
Youngstown Colts	55	68	.447	21½	52,000	Charles Harig
Uniontown Coal Barons	53	72	.424	24½	75,000	Alexander Stutzke
Johnstown Johnnies	52	73	.416	25½	101,000	Jay Kirke, Jr.

Playoff: Vandergrift 3 games, Erie 0; Butler 3 games, Niagara Falls 2.
Finals: Vandergrift 4 games, Butler 0.

Player statistics
Player	Team	Stat	Tot	Player	Team	Stat	Tot
Alex Garbowski	Vandergrift	BA	.396	Egon Feuker	Erie	W	18
Bob Reash	Oil City	Runs	115	Stan Fain	Uniontown	SO	165
Keith Peloe	Niagara Falls	Runs	115	Egon Feuker	Erie	ERA	2.81
Bob Reash	Oil City	Hits	183	Whitey Ford	Butler	PCT	.765 13–4
Jack Merson	Uniontown	RBI	107				
Maurice Cunningham	Youngstown	HR	26				

1948 Middle Atlantic League
schedule

Team standings	W	L	PCT	GB	Attend	Managers
Vandergrift Pioneers	86	39	.688	-	51,367	Floyd Patterson / Lew Krausse
Erie Sailors	80	44	.645	5½	105,562	Don Ramsey
Uniontown Coal Barons	77	49	.611	9½	82,147	Bill Mongiello
Johnstown Johnnies	67	57	.540	18½	102,365	Roy Nichols
Butler Yankees	61	64	.488	25	41,586	Jack Farmer
Oil City Refiners	50	76	.397	36½	47,682	Ray Dahlstrom / Otto Denning
New Castle Chiefs	43	83	.341	43½	42,297	Robert Crow / Frankie Pytlak; Carl Miller
Youngstown Colts	37	89	.294	49½	41,123	Bud Ott / Lewis Richardson

Playoff: Vandergrift 3 games, Uniontown 1; Erie 3 games, Johnstown 1.
Finals: Erie 4 games, Vandergrift 1.

Player statistics
Player	Team	Stat	Tot	Player	Team	Stat	Tot
Art Seguso	Butler	BA	.357	George Heller	Vandergrift	W	20
Robert Hill	Vandergrift	Runs	120	George Heller	Vandergrift	SO	161
Rocky Tedesco	Vandergrift	Hits	178	Walter Cox	Erie	ERA	2.71
Art Seguso	Butler	RBI	146	George Heller	Vandergrift	PCT	.833 20–4
Earl Littenberger	Vandergrift	HR	26				

1949 Middle Atlantic League
schedule

Team standings	W	L	PCT	GB	Attend	Managers
Erie Sailors	85	53	.616	-	101,038	Pete Pavich
Johnstown Johnnies	84	55	.604	1½	105,776	Roy Nichols
Youngstown Athletics	74	62	.544	10	62,667	Eddie Morgan
Oil City Refiners	67	69	.493	17	55,316	Otto Denning
Butler Tigers	66	72	.478	19	40,221	Bob Engle / Boom-Boom Beck
Vandergrift Pioneers	63	72	.467	20½	40,523	George Savino
Uniontown Coal Barons	55	83	.398	30	38,037	Wes Griffin
New Castle Nats	54	82	.397	30	28,233	Bill Mongiello

Playoff: Erie 4 games, Johnstown 3.

Player statistics
Player	Team	Stat	Tot	Player	Team	Stat	Tot
Bob Betz	Youngstown	BA	.345	Johnny Kucab	Youngstown	W	21
Spider Wilhelm	Youngstown	Runs	145	Charlie Wagner	New Castle	SO	206
Spider Wilhelm	Youngstown	Hits	181	Charlie Wagner	New Castle	ERA	3.20
Bob Betz	Youngstown	Hits	181	Harry Hintz	Johnstown	PCT	.778 14–4
Bob Betz	Youngstown	RBI	135				
Joseph Beran	Johnstown	HR	36				
Bill Palumbo	Johnstown	BB	152				

1950 Middle Atlantic League
schedule

Team standings	W	L	PCT	GB	Attend	Managers
Oil City Refiners	70	44	.617	-	39,267	Jim Davis
Butler Tigers	67	49	.578	4	31,816	Marv Olson
Erie Sailors	63	52	.548	7½	54,850	Pete Pavich
New Castle Nats	64	54	.542	8	31,082	Charles Cronin
Youngstown Athletics	51	61	.455	18	14,003	Buck Etchison
Niagara Falls Citizens	48	69	.410	23½	50,224	Mike Ulisney / Walt Chipple
Johnstown Johnnies	45	69	.395	25	43,387	Roy Nichols
Vandergrift Pioneers	31	41	.431	NA	13,493	Don Hasenmayer

Vandergrift folded July 20
Playoffs: Oil City 3 games, Erie 0; Butler 3 games, New Castle 2
Finals: Butler 4 games, Oil City, 3.

Player statistics
Player	Team	Stat	Tot	Player	Team	Stat	Tot
Robert Huddleton	Oil City	BA	.364	Paul Foytack	Butler	W	18
Milton Kress	Erie	Runs	116	Paul Foytack	Butler	SO	219
Tom Falk	Butler	Hits	148	Paul Foytack	Butler	ERA	2.78
Buck Etchison	Youngstown	RBI	115	Harvey Roop	Vandergrift	HR	21

1951 Middle Atlantic League
schedule

Team standings	W	L	PCT	GB	Attend	Managers
Erie Sailors	85	40	.680	-	45,892	Pete Appleton
Niagara Falls Citizens	74	47	.612	9	44,000	Jim Davis
New Castle Indians	61	58	.513	21	42,000	Al Milnar
Lockport Locks	65	63	.508	21½	24,375	Bill Mongiello / Glenn Gardner
Butler Tigers	48	74	.352	35½	31,000	Norm Gerdeman / Bill Allen; Red Barrett
Youngstown Athletics / Oil City A's	24	75	.242	NA	14,988	Mike Garbark / Rudy York

Youngstown moved to Oil City June 2; Oil City disbanded August 6.
Playoff: Niagara Falls 4 games, Erie 2;

Player statistics
Player	Team	Stat	Tot	Player	Team	Stat	Tot
Walter Kowalski	New Castle	BA	.375	Kenneth Yount	Niagara Falls	W	20
Walter Kowalski	New Castle	Runs	134	Frank Zeisz	Niagara Falls	SO	153
Jack Byers	Erie	Runs	134	Kenneth Yount	Niagara Falls	ERA	2.84
Walter Kowalski	New Castle	Hits	169	Keith Nicolls	Erie	PCT	.867 13–2
Walter Kowalski	New Castle	RBI	134				
Rudy York	New Castle/Oil City	HR	34				

== Baseball Hall of Fame alumni ==
- Walter Alston, 1935–1936 Huntington Red Birds
  1938, 1940 Portsmouth Red Birds
  1941–1942 Springfield Cardinals
- Chief Bender, 1927 Johnstown Johnnies
- Joe Cronin, 1925 Johnstown Johnnies
- Whitey Ford, 1947 Butler Yankees
- Bob Lemon, 1938–1939 Springfield Indians
- Joe Medwick, 1930 Scottdale Scotties
- Art Rooney, 1925 Wheeling Stogies *Pro Football Hall of Fame
- Dan Rooney, 1925 Wheeling Stogies *Pro Football Hall of Fame
