= Springfield Cardinals (Ohio) =

Minor league baseball team (1933–1942)

- 1941–1942; (1933–1934, 1937–1939, 1941–1942); Springfield, Ohio

Minor league affiliations
- Class: Class C (1933–1934, 1937–1939, 1941–1942)
- League: Middle Atlantic League (1933–1934, 1937–1939, 1941–1942)

Major league affiliations
- Team: Washington Senators (1933); Pittsburgh Pirates (1934); Cleveland Indians (1937–1939); St. Louis Cardinals (1941–1942)

Minor league titles
- League titles (0): None
- Wild card berths (4): 1937; 1938; 1939; 1941

Team data
- Name: Springfield Chicks (1933); Springfield Pirates (1934); Springfield Indians (1937–1939); Springfield Cardinals (1941–1942)
- Ballpark: Eagles Field (1933–1934); Municipal Stadium (1937–1939, 1941–1942)

The Springfield Cardinals were a minor league baseball team based in Springfield, Ohio. The Springfield Cardinals were a minor league affiliate of the St. Louis Cardinals and played as a member of the Class C level Middle Atlantic League before folding with the league in 1942. Baseball Hall of Fame member Walter Alston was the player/manager for the Cardinals in 1941 and 1942.

Between 1933 and 1942, Springfield teams played as members of the Middle Atlantic League, beginning with the 1933 Springfield Chicks playing as an affiliate of the Washington Senators. In 1934 the Springfield Pirates played as an affiliate of the Pittsburgh Pirates. The Springfield Indians played as an affiliate of with the Cleveland Indians beginning in 1937 before the franchise became the Springfield Cardinals in 1941.

Baseball Hall of Fame member Bob Lemon began his professional career playing two seasons for the Springfield Indians in 1938 and 1939.

The Springfield Middle Atlantic League teams hosted their minor league home games at Eagles Field before moving in 1937 to Municipal Stadium, known today as Carleton Davidson Stadium.

== History ==
=== Early Springfield teams ===
Springiled, Ohio, first hosted minor league baseball in 1877, when the "Springfield Champion City" team played the season as members of the League Alliance.

The Springfield Governors teams played between 1897 and 1907 in the Interstate League and Central League. Between 1908 and 1917, the Springfield Reapers teams played in the Ohio State League and Central League, until the Central League folded following the 1917 season during World War I.

Before Springfield began its tenure of play as members of the Middle Atlantic League, the Springfield Buckeyes franchise played from 1928 to 1930 as members of the Class B level Central League, hosting home games at Eagles Field. The Central League folded following the 1930 season. After not hosting a team for over a decade, Springfield native Joe Dunn was instrumental in bringing minor league baseball back to Springfield in 1928, forming the "Springfield Baseball Club Inc." with two of his siblings, Charles and Katherine. The franchise secured rent at Eagles Field in Springfield for $3,000 per season, with the ballpark concession rights contracted to Jacobs Brothers of Buffalo, New York for $3,000. As owner of the Springfield franchise during the Great Depression, Joe Dunn was left with debt from the team, but was able to repay his creditors over time.

=== 1933 & 1934: Middle Atlantic League ===
After a two-season hiatus from minor league play following the folding of the Central League, the 1933 Springfield "Chicks" team was formed and resumed hosting home games at Eagles Field in Springfield. The Springfield Chicks began play as members of the Class C level Middle Atlantic League.

Playing as a Washington Senators minor league affiliate, Springfield joined the eight-team Middle Atlantic League for its ninth season of play. The league was first formed in 1925, founded by Elmer Daly. The Chicks joined the Beckley Black Knights, Charleston Senators, Dayton Ducks (Brooklyn Dodgers affiliate), Huntington Boosters (Detroit Tigers), Johnstown Johnnies, Wheeling Stogies (New York Yankees) and Zanesville Grays (Cleveland Indians) teams in forming the 1933 league. The opening day of the Middle Atlantic League schedule was May 4, 1933.

Jake Pitler was hired as the Springfield Chicks player/manager in 1933. A second baseman as a player, Pitler had been a player/manager in the New York–Pennsylvania League the previous four seasons, first with the Elmira Colonels then with the Hazleton Mountaineers. Pitler had played in the major leagues with the Pittsburgh Pirates in 1917 and 1918, appearing in 111 total games and batting .232. At age 39, Pitler played second base for the Springfield Chicks and batted .262 with 3 home runs in 98 games. Pitler later served as a bench coach for the Brooklyn Dodgers from 1947 to 1957 and continued serving the Dodgers as a scout after the franchise moved to Los Angeles. As a Dodgers coach he worked under managers Leo Durocher, Burt Shotton, Charlie Dressen, and Walter Alston. On August 25, 1956, the Brooklyn Dodgers honored him holding, "Jake Pitler Night" at Ebbets Field.

In their first season of Middle Atlantic play, the Chicks ended their first season in the league with a final regular season record of 67–64 record to end the season fourth place under player/manager Pitler. Springfield finished 10.0 games behind the first place Wheeling Stogies and did not qualify for the playoff where Wheeling was defeated by the Zanesville Grays 4 games to 1 to win the championship.

Springfield shortstop Mickey Noonan hit 26 home runs to lead the Middle Atlantic League, while also batting .349 at age 28. Eddie Wilson of Springfield led the league in runs scored with 112. Springfield right-handed pitcher Rex McDonald won 19 games on the season, tops among Middle Atlantic League pitchers.

An outfielder, Eddie Wilson he hit .337 with 10 home runs and 25 stolen bases playing in 112 games for Springfield in 1933. He later played in the major leagues with the Brooklyn Dodgers in 1936 and 1937, batting .317 and .404 OBP with 4 home runs for the Dodgers across 88 games in his only two major league seasons. After playing his final professional baseball season in 1941 at age 31, Wilson voluntarily entered military service. Wilson served in the Merchant Marines during World War II. He later became a school teacher.

Pitching in 19 games for Springfield at age 47, Elmer Knetzer compiled a 7-7 record in 1933, his final season as a player and 16 years following his last major league appearance. Ketzler had pitched in the major leagues from 1909 to 1917. He compiled a 69-69 record pitching for the Brooklyn Dodgers (1909–1912), Pittsburgh Rebels (1914–1915), Boston Braves (1916) and Cincinnati Reds (1916–1917).

Right-handed pitcher Ed Edelen played for Springfield in 1933 after having played briefly for the Washington Senators, appearing in two games at the end of the 1932 season. Edelen's season with Springfield was his final season as a player, as he compiled a 0-1 record in 4 games for the Chicks before pursuing a career as a physician. Edelen attended the Georgetown University School of Medicine and graduated in 1937, beginning a lengthy career as a Medical doctor. From 1938 until his death in 1982, Edelen practiced medicine in Charles County, Maryland as a general practitioner. He served a tenure as president of Physicians Memorial Hospital (today's University of Maryland Charles Regional Medical Center).

After playing briefly for Springfield in 1933, Arthur Mansfield went on to become the long-time baseball coach of the Wisconsin Badgers from 1940 to 1970, leading the Badgers to a fourth-place finish in the 1950 College World Series, two Big Ten Conference championships and winning 441 career collegiate games. Aside from coaching, Mansfield also taught at the University of Wisconsin for 37 years.

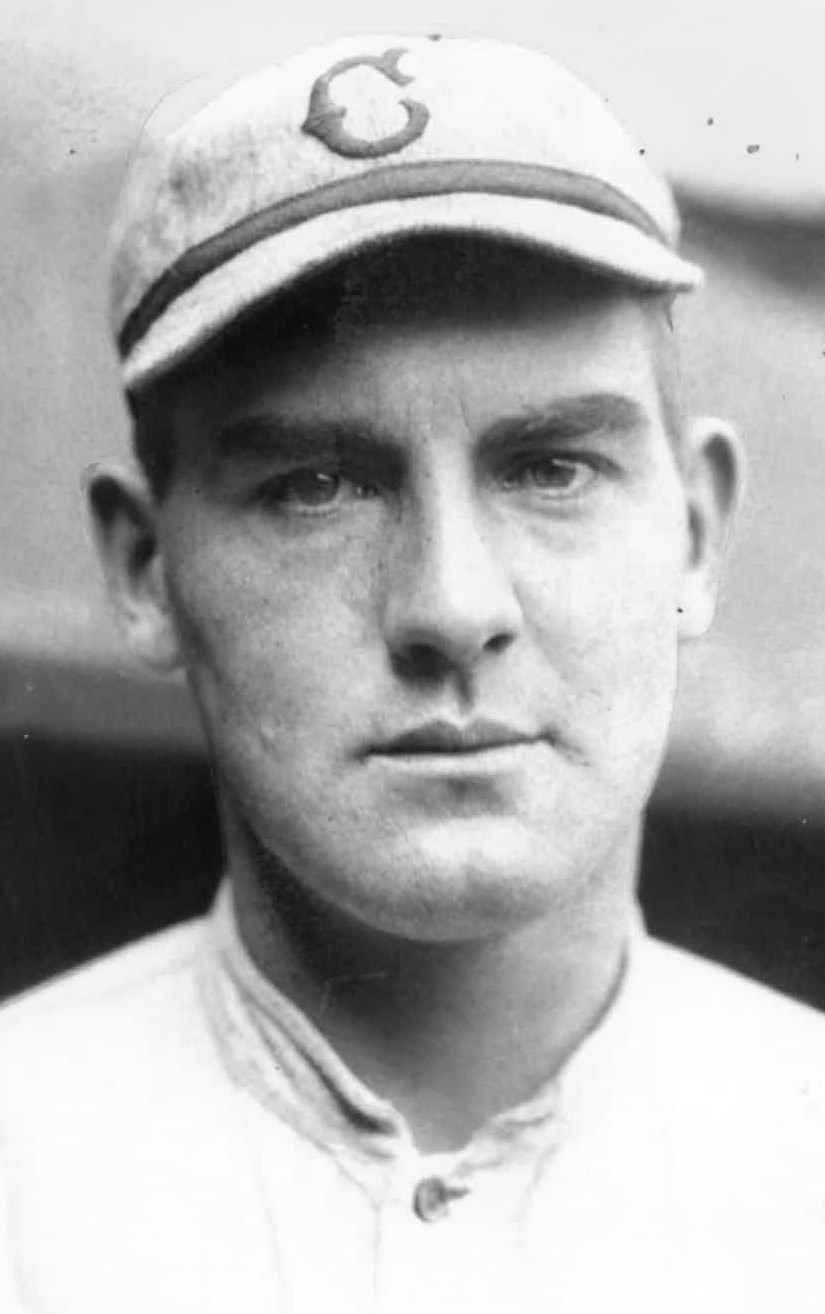
Rube Bressler with the Cincinnati Reds in 1920. Bressler managed the 1934 Springfield Pirates. He is a member of the Cincinnati Reds Hall of Fame.

The Springfield team continued play in the 1934 Middle Atlantic League. Springfield became known as the Springfield "Pirates" for the 1934 season, as the team became a minor league affiliate of the Pittsburgh Pirates. The Pirates ended the season in sixth place in the eight-team league with a 57–65 record. The team was managed by Al DeVormer and Rube Bressler during the season. Springfield finished 14½ games behind the first place Zanesville Grays in the final regular season standings. Zanesville won their third consecutive league championship in beating the Dayton Ducks 4 games to 3 in the league final. Springfield infielder Mickey Noonan again lead the league in home runs, tying with Dayton's Johnny McCarthy with 17. Playing third base, Mickey Noonon returned to the team and batted .312 for the Pirates, while hitting his league 17 home runs.

Springfield manager Rube Bressler had a lengthy major league career that had recently concluded when he managed and played for the Pirates in 1934. At age 39, he had 4 pinch hitting appearances for Springfield in his final professional play. Bressler was first a left-handed pitcher in the major leagues before being converted to an outfielder and first baseman. He played for the Philadelphia Athletics from 1914 to 1916 and Cincinnati Reds from 1917 to 1920, before being converted to an outfielder and first baseman while playing for Cincinnati through 1927, He then played for the Brooklyn Robins (1928-1931) and the Philadelphia Phillies (1931) and St. Louis Cardinals (1932) to conclude his major league career. He played in the 1919 World Series for the Cincinnati Reds won against the Black Sox Scandal implicated Chicago White Sox team. Bressler batted .301 with a .378 OBP and 32 home runs in his major league career, playing in 19 seasons, 11 with Cincinnati. As a pitcher in the majors he compiled a 26-32 career record with a 3.40 ERA. Bressler did not pitch after the 1920 season and played his last major league game in 1932. Since 1900, including Bressler, few players have started their careers as pitchers and ended up as position players. Among them are: Babe Ruth, Smoky Joe Wood, Johnny Cooney, Reb Russell, and Rick Ankiel.

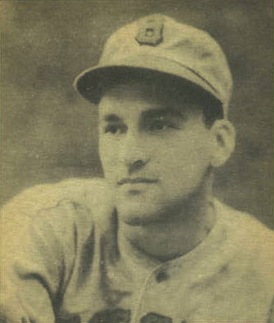
Eddie Miller with the Boston Braves in 1940. Miller played shortstop for Springfield in 1934 at age 17. He was a seven-time MLB All-Star.

At age 17, shortstop Eddie Miller made his professional debut with Springfield in 1934, batting .286 with three home runs in 122 games for the Pirates. Miller made his major league debut in 1936 and went on to become a seven-time All-star. Miller played in the major leagues with the Cincinnati Reds (1936–1937), Boston Braves (1939–1942), Cincinnati Reds (1943–1947), Philadelphia Phillies (1948–1949) and St. Louis Cardinals (1950) in his major league career, batting .238 with 97 career home runs in 1,510 games over fourteen seasons. Miller was considered to be the best fielding shortstop in the National League. Having been signed by the Pittsburgh Pirates out of South Hills High School in Pennsylvania, Miller was sold to the Cincinnati Reds for $1,000 following his season with Springfield.

The Springfield Pirates did not return to the league for the 1935 or 1936 Middle Atlantic League seasons, with the Springfield franchise replaced by the Portsmouth Pirates in the eight-team league, as the Pittsburgh Pirates affiliation moved to the new Portsmouth team. The Huntington Red Birds and Zanesville Greys won the league championships in the two seasons without Springfield as a league member.

=== 1937: Rejoin Middle Atlantic League / New ballpark ===
Springfield returned to the Class C level Middle Atlantic League in 1937, replacing the Huntington Red Birds team in the eight-team league. The team became known as the Springfield "Indians" as they rejoined the Middle Atlantic League while becoming a minor league affiliate of the Cleveland Indians. The league began its schedule on May 4, 1937 as Springfield joined the Akron Yankees (New York Yankees affiliate), Canton Terriers (Boston Red Sox), Charleston Senators (Detroit Tigers), Dayton Ducks (Chicago White Sox), Johnstown Johnnies (St. Louis Browns), Portsmouth Red Birds (St. Louis Cardinals) and Zanesville Grays (Boston Bees) in the 1937 Middle Atlantic League.

The newly formed Springfield Indians opened a new ballpark, and the team began playing home games at Springfield's Municipal Stadium location in 1937.

In rejoining the Middle Atlantic League, Earl Wolgamot began a three-season tenure serving as the Springfield Indians manager. Wolgamot had been a bench coach for the major league Cleveland Indians from 1931 to 1935. In joining the Indians, Wolgamot had just led the Zanesville grays to three consecutive Middle Atlantic League championships before moving to Springfield. Zanesville had been a Cleveland Indians affiliate and Wolgamot remained with the affiliate team when Cleveland moved their affiliation to Springifled in 1937. A long-time minor league catcher, Wolgamot appeared in 22 games as a player for Springfield in 1937 at age 44, batting .164.

With Earl Wolgamot managing the Indians, the team finished with an 81–47 record and Springfield ended the season in second place. In the eight-team Middle Atlantic League, Springfield finished a mere ½ game behind the first place Canton Terriers (81–46) in the final regular season standings. The Indians qualified for the league playoffs Wolgamot's former team, the Zanesville Greys finished in last place in 1937. In their first-round playoff series of the four-team playoffs, the Akron Yankees defeated Springfield 3 games to 1 and ended their season. The Canton Terriers then defeated Akron in the final series to win the Middle Atlantic League title.

Springfield's Skeeter Scalzi won the Middle Atlantic League batting title, hitting .377, along with hitting a league leading 34 home runs. An infielder, Scalzi also lead the Middle Atlantic League with 147 runs scored and 197 total hits in his outstanding season for Springfield. Indians pitcher Ken Jungels had topped the league with a 21–4 record.

Pitching for Springfield at age 21, Ken Jungels ended his 1937 season in the major leagues after his strong season with Springfield. In his major league career, Jungels pitched parts of five seasons for the Cleveland Indians (1937–1938, 1940–1941) and Pittsburgh Pirates (1942). He had a 1-0 career major league record with a 6.80 ERA in 25 games, with all of his appearances coming in relief. His career was interrupted military service by During World War II, where served in the United States Army. Jungels pitched three seasons in the minor leagues after his military service and never appeared again in the major leagues. A Wisconsin native, following his baseball career Jungels operated a tavern near County Stadium in Milwaukee until his death at age 59 in 1975.

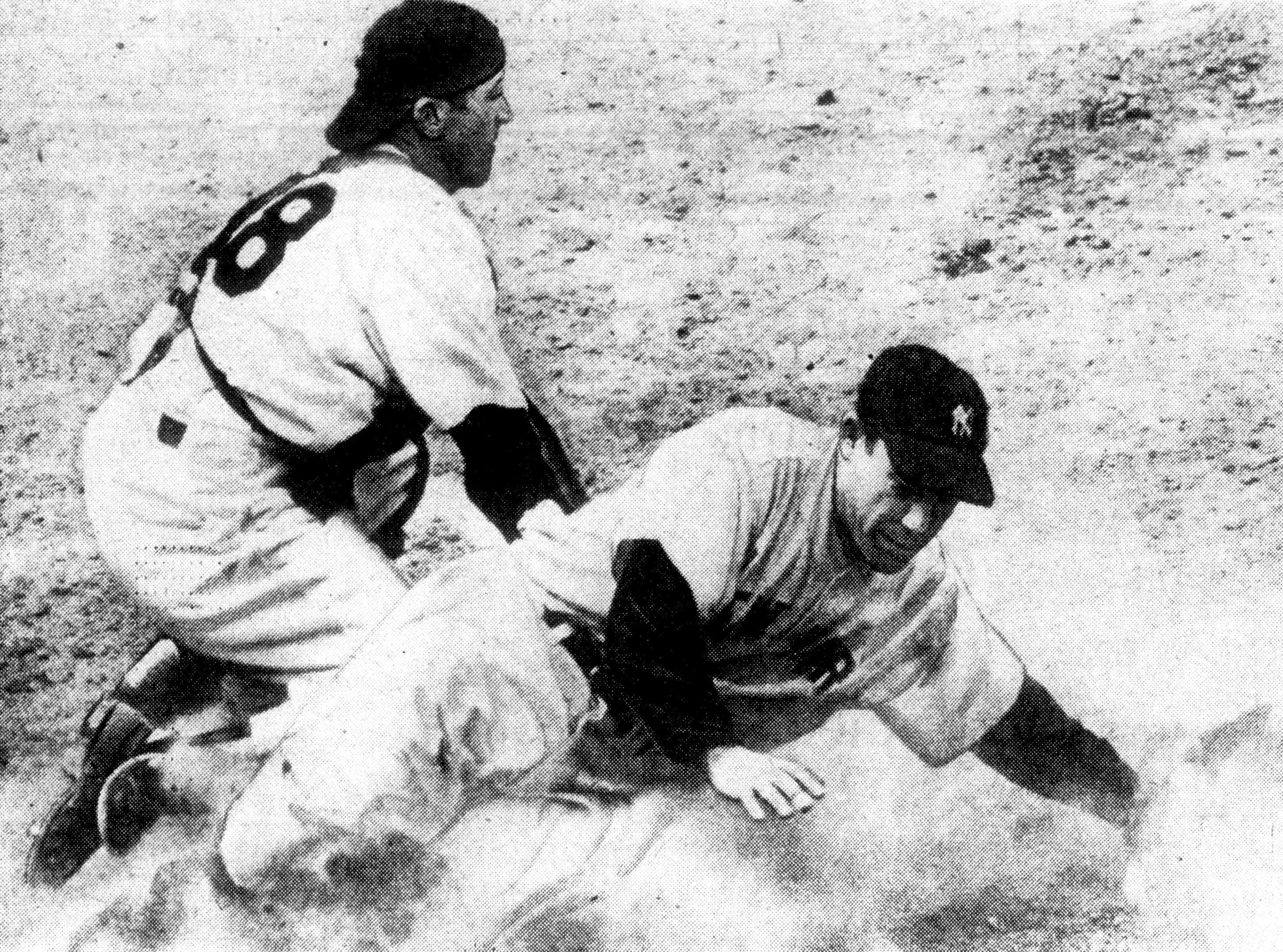
Phil Masi (left) and Yogi Berra in a 1950 play at the plate. Mesi played for Springfield in 1937 and 1938 and was a three-time MLB All-Star

Playing shortstop, Skeeter Scalzi had a strong overall season for Springfield in 1937, adding 106 RBIs and 32 stolen bases in his 127 games. Scalzi had a brief major league playing career playing for the New York Giants at the end of the 1939 season, batting .333 in 11 appearances. Scalzi played 17 seasons in minor league baseball and also managed for 12 seasons in the minor leagues. Playing for Springfield at age 24 in his second season, Scalzi had made his professional debut playing for Earl Wolgamot and for the Zanesville Greys in the season prior.

Obtained during the season, catcher Phil Masi played for Springfield in 1937, his first of two seasons playing with the Springfield Indians. He batted .283 in 12 games for Springfield. Masi had been playing with the Wausau Timberjacks to begin the 1937 season before his contract was purchased by the Milwaukee Brewers who then assigned him to play for the Springfield Indians. Baseball Commissioner Kenesaw Mountain Landis ruled that Masi's contract with Milwaukee was a violation of baseball rules and voided the contract. Masi was then allowed him to sign a non-reserve contract with Springfield that allowed him to become a free agent following the season.

=== 1938 & 1939: Middle Atlantic League / Springfield Indians ===
The 1938 Springfield Indians continued play as members of the Class C level Middle Atlantic League and again qualified for the playoffs. The Indians ended the season finishing in third place in the eight-team league. Springfield had a 71–59 record under returning manager Earl Wolgamot. In the final Middle Atlantic League standings, Springfield finished 8½ games behind the first place Portsmouth Red Birds (79–50). In their first-round playoff series of the four-team playoff, Portsmouth defeated Springfield 3 games to 1 to end the Indians' season. The win led Portsmouth to the league finals, where they defeated the Akron Yankees in seven games to capture the league title.

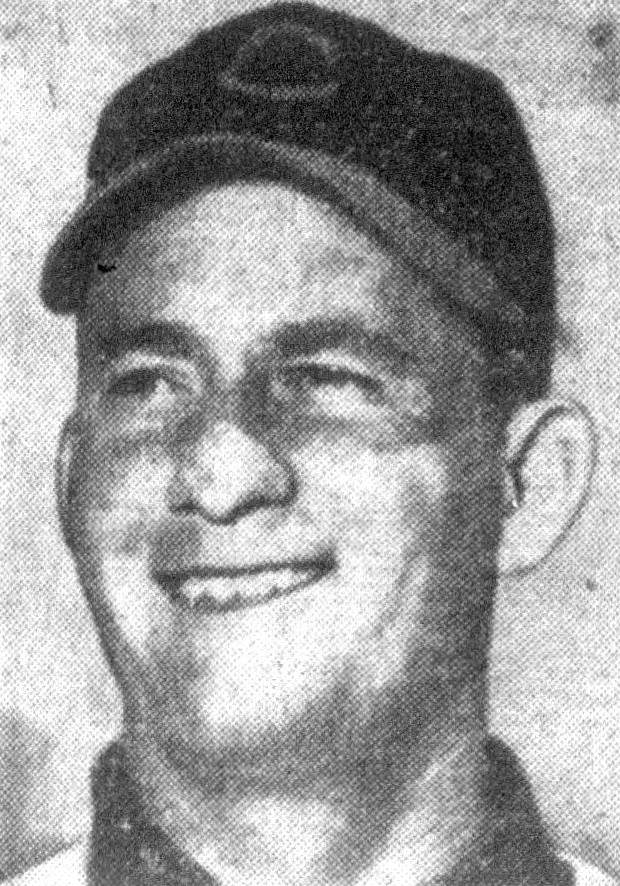
Bob Lemon with the Cleveland Indians in 1950.

At the age of 17, just after graduating from high school, Baseball Hall of Fame member Bob Lemon signed with the Cleveland Indians for a salary of $100.00 per month. He was first assigned by Cleveland to the Oswego Netherlands of the Canadian–American League before joining the Springfield Indians. In 75 games he recorded a .312 batting average while playing shortstop and in the outfield. Lemon was a position player to begin his professional career before being shifter to pitcher after playing in the major leagues with the Cleveland Indians as a third baseman and centerfielder. Lemon did not want to pitch, but eventually realized he had more potential as a pitcher in the major leagues after being reduced to a utility role as a hitter. Playing with the Cleveland Indians from 1941 to 1958, Lemon compiled a 207–128 record as a pitcher, with a 3.23 career ERA despite not pitching full time until the 1946 season. Lemon stepped away from baseball from 1943 to 1945 as he served in the United States Navy during World War II and missed three seasons. Following his playing career Lemon became a longtime major league manager and managed the New York Yankees to victory in the 1978 World Series, where his Springfield teammate Jim Hegan was one of his coaches on the Yankees staff. Lemon also managed the Kansas City Royals and Chicago White Sox. and compiled a 430–403 record as a manager. Lemon was inducted into the Baseball Hall of Fame as a player in 1976.

Phil Mesi returned to Springfield in 1938 and played mostly as a catcher for Springfield, adding 15 games in the outfield. His fellow catcher was a future All-Star catcher for the Cleveland Indians, seventeen-year-old Jim Hegan. Masi hit .308, with 16 home runs and 97 RBIs for Springfield. He made his major league debut at the end of the 1938 season with the Boston Braves. Mesi went on to become a three-time All-star in the major leagues, playing 14 major league seasons with the Boston Braves (1939–1949), Pittsburgh Pirates (1949) and Chicago White Sox (1950–1952). Mesi batted .263, with a .244 OBP, 47 career home runs in 1,229 career games. Mesi had considerably more total walks (410) than strikeouts (311) in his major career.

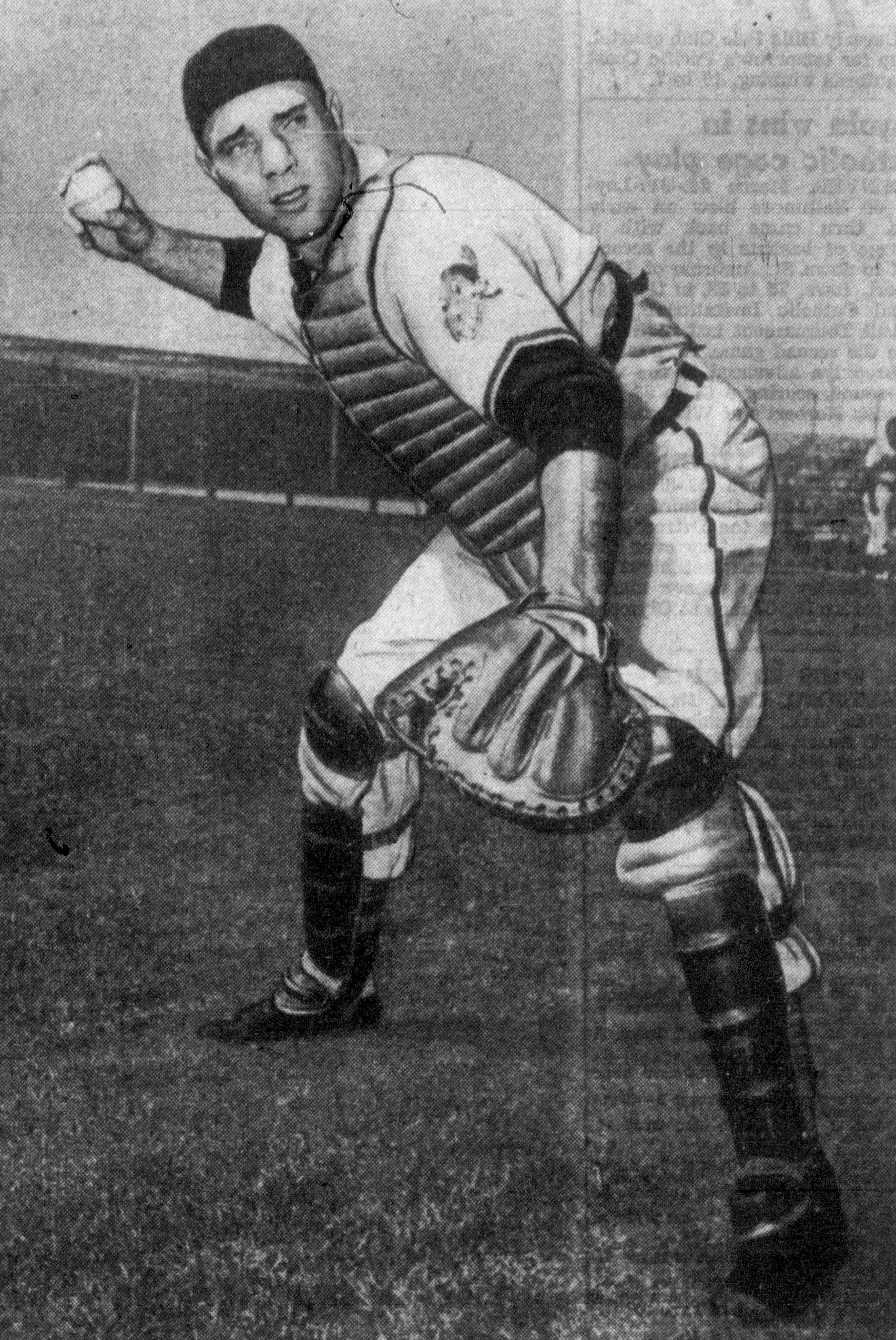
Catcher Jim Hegan with the Cleveland Indians in 1949. He played for Springfield in 1938 and 1939. He was a five-time MLB All-Star and later a bench coach for the New York Yankees.

Catcher Jim Hegan played his first of two seasons with Springfield in 1938, batting .292 with 5 home runs in 62 games, playing in his first professional season at age 17. A member of the Cleveland Guardians Hall of Fame, Hegan became a five-time major league All Star. He played for the Cleveland Indians (1941–1942, 1946–1957), Detroit Tigers (1958), Philadelphia Phillies (1958–1959), San Francisco Giants (1959) and Chicago Cubs (1960) in his lengthy major league career. He batted .229 in his career. During World War II, Hegan stepped away from his baseball career for military service. Hegan served in the U.S. Coast Guard from 1943 to 1945 before his discharge. After his playing career ended in 1960, Hegan became a major league bench coach for the Chicago Cubs beginning in 1960 and then with the New York Yankees, where he served through 1978, a total of 16 seasons with New York. The Yankees won the 1978 World Series in his final season as a coach, when New York was managed by his former teammate with Springfield and Cleveland, Bob Lemon. With the Yankees he mentored catchers Thurman Munson cand Rick Dempsey. Hegan was still with the Yankees, serving as a scout when he died in 1984 at age 63. His son Mike Hegan played three seasons with the New York Yankees while Jim Hegan was a coach on the team. Mike Hegan had served as a bat boy for the Cleveland Indians as a boy when his father played for Cleveland.

In the 1939 Springfield Indians' season, the team made a run to the championship finals in the eight-team Middle Atlantic League. Springfield finished the regular season with a modest 66–64 record to finish in fourth place in their last season under manager Earl Wolgamot. With their fourth place finish, the Indians finished 11½ games behind the first place Canton Terriers and earned the last playoff spot . In the first round of the four-team playoffs, Springfield defeated the second place Charleston Senators 3 games to 1 and advanced. In the finals, Canton defeated Springfield 4 games to 1 to win the championship.

In his first professional season at age 22, Allie Reynolds pitched for the Springfield Indians in 1939 and compiled an 11-7 record with a 3.60 ERA in 24 games. Relatively new to pitching, Reynolds also walked 107 batters in 155 innings. Reynolds signed with the Cleveland Indians having graduated from Oklahoma Agricultural & Mechanical College (A&M), known today as Oklahoma State University. Reynolds attended the Oklahoma A&M on a track and field scholarship while also playing for the football team. In 1937, Henry Iba, coach of the baseball team (and basketball team), first noticed Reynolds practicing javelin throws on a field next to the baseball field. He asked Reynolds to throw batting practice for the baseball team, to which he agreed. Reynolds was impressive in throwing batting practice and was asked to join the baseball team by Iba. Reynolds played as an outfielder and pitcher during his senior year in 1938. Reynolds was drafted by the New York Giants of the National Football League as a halfback. Since Reynolds preferred baseball to football, he chose not to sign.

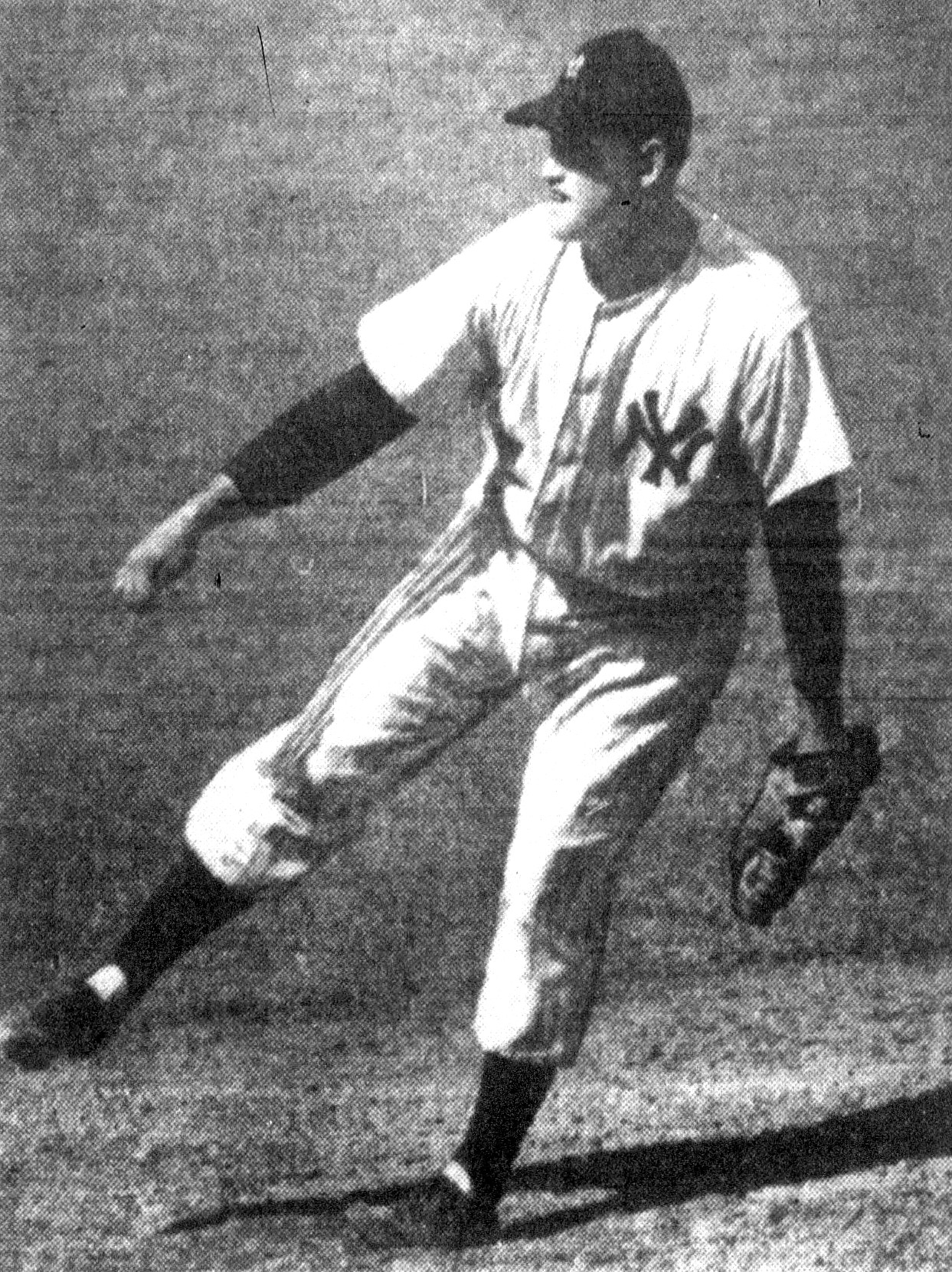
Allie Reynolds with the New York Yankees in 1950. He had an 11–7 record for Springfield in 1939. He was a six-time MLB All-Star and six-time world champion.

Coach Henry Iba (who later coached the United States men's national basketball team to gold medals at the 1964 and 1968 Summer Olympics) set up a meeting with Hugh Alexander, a scout for the Cleveland Indians and Reynolds. The Indians scouted and signed Reynolds and he received a $1,000 signing bonus. The Indians wanted to convert Reynolds to a catcher, but Reynolds refused to give up pitching. He was assigned by Cleveland to pitch for Springfield to begin his career. A six-time major league All-star, Reynolds pitched for the Cleveland Indians (1942–1946) and New York Yankees (1947–1954). He retired with a 182–107 record, 48 saves and 3.30 ERA. He won six world series championships while making six All-Star teams. Reynolds had a 7–2 record with a 2.79 ERA over 77 innings in the World Series. Aside from his starts, he made six relief appearances in the World Series, and had a win or save in each, including the clinching games of the 1950, 1952 and 1953 World Series. Reynolds also batted .308 in his World Series appearances. Reynolds' baseball career ended prematurely. He retired as the result of a significant back injury that resulted from an accident. Reynolds was injured when the Yankees' team charter bus crashed into an overpass in Philadelphia during the 1953 season. He pitched in pain against doctors' orders and retired after the 1954 season as a result of the injury. Reynolds is the namesake of Allie P. Reynolds Stadium in Stillwater, Oklahoma. The ballpark was the longtime home field of the Oklahoma State University baseball team. A plaque in Reynolds' honor, was dedicated in Monument Park at Yankee Stadium on August 26, 1989.

Returning to Springfield to begin the 1939 season, Bob Lemon played in 80 games with Springfield and hit .293. He was then assigned to the New Orleans Pelicans of the Southern Association, where he batted .309 to conclude his season.

Catcher Jim Hegan batted .243 in 109 games with 13 home runs in his second season for the Springfield Indians. Hegan made his major league debut in 1941 with the Cleveland Indians.

=== 1940 to 1942: Middle Atlantic League / Springfield Cardinals ===
The Class C level Middle Atlantic League reduced from eight-teams to six-teams for the 1940 season and Springfield was dropped by the league. Springfield and the Erie Sailors did not return to league play for the 1940 season. The Akron Yankees won the 1940 league title and Walter Alston led the league in home runs while playing for the last place Portsmouth Red Birds. With Springfield folded, former manager Earl Wolgamot remained in the Cleveland Indians organization in 1940, becoming the manager of their Class A level affiliate, the Wilkes-Barre Barons of the Eastern League. Bob Lemon joined Wolgamot in moving to the Barons in 1940 and the two remained in Wilkes-Barre for the 1941 season before Lemon made his major league debut with the Cleveland Indians at the end of the season. Wolgamott then returned to Springfield however, as he was hired in 1944 to manage the Springfield Giants of the Ohio State League.

With a new manager and a new affiliate team, Springfield returned to play in 1941, as the Middle Atlantic League expanded to eight teams, while remaining a Class C level league. The Middle Atlantic League dropped the Portsmouth Red Birds while adding three former league members in the Zanesville Cubs, Erie Sailors and Springfield teams back into the league. The Akron Yankees, Canton Terriers, Charleston Senators, Dayton Ducks and Youngstown Browns teams completed the league lineup for the 1941 season, which began play on May 1, 1941.

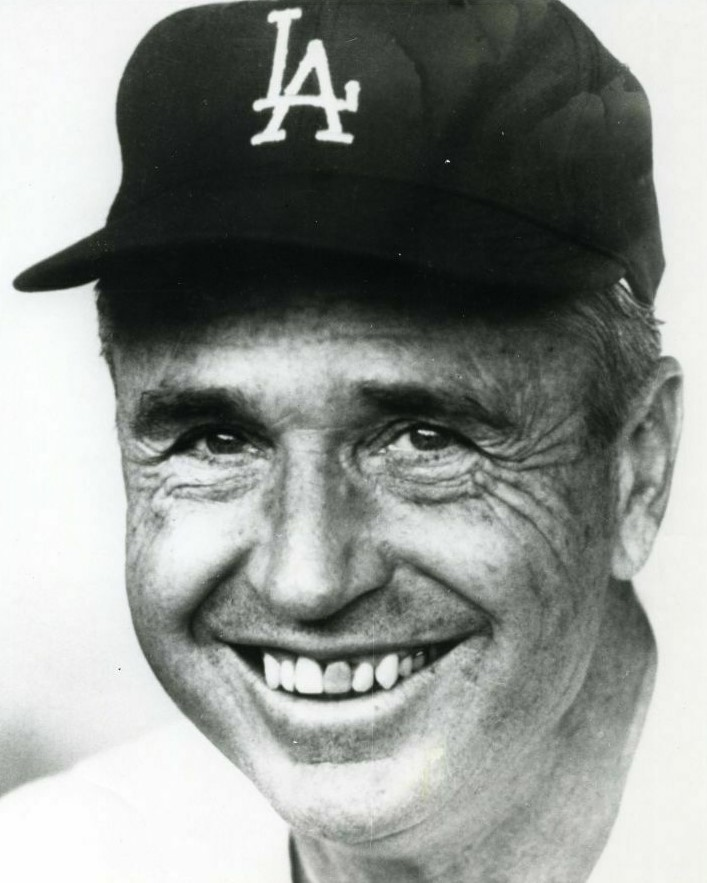
Hall of Fame manager Walter Alston with the Los Angeles Dodgers in 1976. In 1941 and 1942, he was the player/manager for the Springfield Cardinals.

Future Baseball Hall of Fame member Walter Alston became the player/manager for the Springfield Cardinals in 1941. Alston had briefly played for the St. Louis Cardinals in 1936, appearing in one game. In 1940, while playing for Portsmouth. Alston had replaced Dutch Dorman player-manager for Portsmouth Red Birds, who were a minor league affiliate of the St. Louis Cardinals before shifting their affiliate to Springfield in 1941 and keeping Alston in the role. Alston had also led the Middle Atlantic League with 28 home runs. Alston went on to manage the Brooklyn Dodgers and Los Angeles Dodgers from 1954 to 1976, leading the Dodgers to victories in the 1955 World Series, 1959 World Series and 1965 World Series, while managing such players as Jackie Robinson, Sandy Koufax, Don Drysdale, Gil Hodges, Roy Campanella and Don Sutton. Alston was inducted into the Baseball Hall of Fame in 1983.

The Cardinals were dominant in a 1941 regular season doubleheader against the Youngstown Browns at Youngstown's Idora Park. In the first game, Walter Alston hit 3 home runs in leading Springfield to a victory. In the second game Springfield won by the score of 18-0 aided by seven Youngstown errors as Gilbert Dobbs threw a no hitter for the Cardinals. Dobbs went on to have a 14-9 record in the 1941 season pitching for Springfield.

The Springfield Cardinals qualified for the playoffs following the 1941 season, as the Middle Atlantic League resumed a four-team playoff system when the league returned to an eight-team league. Led by Walter Alston, the Cardinals ended the regular season with a 69–57 record and in fourth place, securing the last playoff qualifying position. Springfield finished 8½ games behind the pennant winning Akron Yankees in the final regular season standings. In their first-round playoff series, the Indians were swept by the Erie Sailors 3 games to 0. Erie won the 1941 Middle Atlantic League championship after final by defeating the Canton Terriers in the final series.

Playing first base, Springfield player/manager Walter Alston led the Middle Atlantic League with 102 RBIs and also with 88 runs scored in 1941.

1942 was final season of play before the Middle Atlantic League paused play during World War II. The league again reduced teams and played the season as a six-team league, with Springfield remaining. With Walter Alston returning for a second season as player/manager, the Cardinals finished in fifth place in final standings with a record of 59–71. Springfield finished 18.0 games behind the first place Charleston Senators and did not qualify for the four-team playoffs won by the Erie Sailors. With another strong season, Walter Alston led the Middle Atlantic League with both 12 home runs and 90 RBIs in 1942. Alston played in 129 games while managing the Springfield Cardinals at age 30 in 1942. He also pitched 7 games for Springfield in 1942.

When Springfield and the Middle Atlantic League did not return to play in 1943, Walter Alston joined the Rochester Red Wings as a player in 1943. He then joined the Trenton Packers, where he was a player-manager in 1944 and 1945. Alston had been offered the job in Trenton, a minor league farm club of the Brooklyn Dodgers, by Branch Rickey, the executive who had signed him as a player with St. Louis. Rickey later hired Alson to manage the Brooklyn Dodgers.

After his two seasons with Trenton, Alston served as a player-manager for the first integrated U.S. baseball team based in the twentieth century, the Nashua Dodgers of the Class-B New England League. Alston managed black Dodgers prospects Don Newcombe and Roy Campanella, leading Nashua to a New England League title in 1946. Alston later said that he did not give much consideration to racial issues and that he had simply thought about how much they would benefit the team.

Alston led the Pueblo Dodgers to the Western League title the next season. He appeared as a player in two games, which were his final professional playing appearances. For his 13-season minor league playing career, Alston hit .295 with 176 home runs. However, he hit only .239 in 535 at bats in Class AA, which was the highest minor league classification through 1945.

With World War II affecting minor league baseball, Springfield was without a team in 1943 following the Middle Atlantic League's folding. However, in 1944, baseball resumed in Springfield, when the Springfield Giants became as members of the Class D level Ohio State League. Earl Wolgamot returned to Springfield from Wilkes-Barre to manage the Giants.

== The ballparks ==
The Springfield teams hosted minor league home games at Eagles Field from 1928 to 1934. The Springfield Buckeyes had rented the ballpark for a sum of $3,000 per season, beginning with the 1928 season. In 1933, the Springfield Chicks resumed hosting minor league play at Eagles Field. The ballpark no longer exists. Eagles Field was located on North Murray, between York Street and East Columbia Street in Springfield, Ohio.

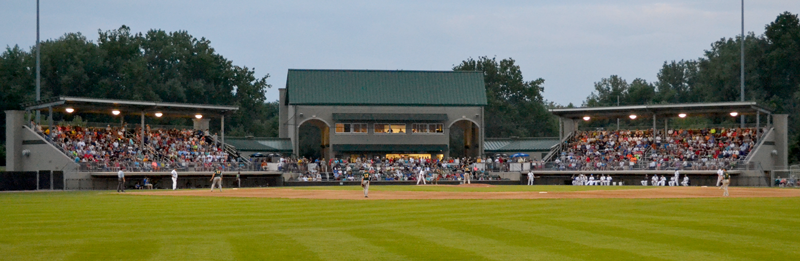
Carleton Davidson Stadium in Springfield in 2017. The site was home to Municipal Stadium which hosted Springfield minor league teams.

In 1937, the Springfield Indians began play at the Municipal Stadium stie. After previously playing at the site, in 1939 the Municipal Stadium grandstand was built as a WPA project. After 61 years of use, the WPA constructed baseball grandstand was demolished in 2000, and the site was renovated, with new grandstands, press box and turf installed. Today, the Municipal Stadium location is home to Carleton Davidson Stadium. The stadium is host to the Champion City Kings of the amateur collegiate Prospect League and the baseball team at Springfield's Wittenberg University. Carleton Davidson Stadium is located at 1101 Mitchell Boulevard in Springfield, Ohio.

== Timeline ==
Year(s)	# Yrs.	Team	Level	League	Affiliate	Ballpark
1933	1	Springfield Chicks	Class C	Middle Atlantic League	Washington Senators	Eagles Park
1934	1	Springfield Pirates	Class C	Middle Atlantic League	Pittsburgh Pirates	Municipal Stadium
1937–1939	3	Springfield Indians	Class C	Middle Atlantic League	Cleveland Indians	Municipal Stadium
1941–1942	2	Springfield Cardinals	Class C	Middle Atlantic League	St. Louis Cardinals	Municipal Stadium

== Year-by-year records ==
Year	Record	Finish	Manager	Playoffs / notes
1933	67–64	4th	Jake Pitler	Did not qualify
1934	57–65	6th	Al DeVormer / Rube Bressler	Did not qualify
1937	81–47	2nd	Earl Wolgamot	Lost in 1st round
1938	71–59	3rd	Earl Wolgamot	Lost in 1st round
1939	66–64	4th	Earl Wolgamot	Lost in finals
1941	69–57	4th	Walter Alston	Lost in 1st round
1942	59–71	5th	Walter Alston	Did not qualify

== Notable alumni ==
- Walter Alston (1941–1942, player/MGR) Inducted Baseball Hall of Fame, 1983
- Bob Lemon (1938–1939) Inducted Baseball Hall of Fame, 1976
- Hugh Alexander (1937)
- George Binks (1937–1938)
- Rube Bressler (1934, MGR) Cincinnati Reds Hall of Fame
- Walter Cazen (1933)
- Tony Castaño (1941–1942)
- Sumpter Clarke (1933)
- Jack Conway (1939)
- Al DeVormer (1934, MGR)
- Ed Edelen (1933)
- Red Embree (1939)
- Tommy Glaviano (1942)
- Stan Goletz (1938)
- Jim Hegan (1938–1939) 5x MLB All-star
- Dixie Howell (1938)
- Ken Jungels (1937)
- Elmer Knetzer (1933)
- Joe Klinger (1934)
- Bill Lobe (1939)
- Arthur Mansfield (1933)
- Phil Masi (1937–1938) 4x MLB All-star
- Carl McNabb (1939)
- Bill McWilliams (1933)
- Eddie Miller (1934) 7x MLB All-star
- Blas Monaco (1937)
- Mike Naymick (1937–1938)
- Paul O'Dea (1939)
- Mike Palagyi (1937)
- Jake Pitler (1933, MGR; 1934)
- Jimmy Pofahl (1937)
- Allie Reynolds (1937) 6x MLB All-star
- Chuck Rowland (1933)
- Skeeter Scalzi (1937)
- Freddy Schmidt (1941–1942)
- Clay Smith (1937)
- Billy Southworth Jr. (1939)
- Bill Trotter (1934)
- Eddie Wilson (1933)
- Max Wilson (1938)
- Earl Wolgamot (1937–1939, MGR)
- Chuck Workman (1937–1939)

== See also ==
- Springfield Chicks players
- Springfield Pirates players
- Springfield Indians players
- Springfield Cardinals players
- List of St. Louis Cardinals minor league affiliates
