= Joe Beggs =

American baseball player (1910–1983)

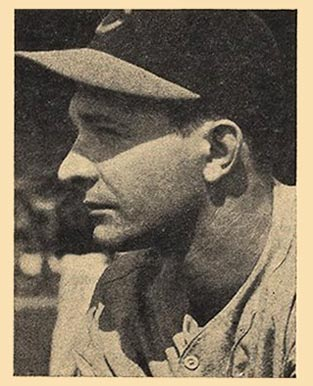
- Pitcher
- Born: November 4, 1910; Rankin, Pennsylvania, U.S.
- Died: July 19, 1983 (aged 72); Indianapolis, Indiana, U.S.
- Batted: Right Threw: Right

MLB debut
- April 19, 1938, for the New York Yankees

Last MLB appearance
- April 24, 1948, for the New York Giants

MLB statistics
- Win–loss record: 48–35
- Earned run average: 2.96
- Strikeouts: 178
- Stats at Baseball Reference

Teams
- New York Yankees (1938); Cincinnati Reds (1940–1944, 1946–1947); New York Giants (1947–1948)

Career highlights and awards
- World Series champion (1940)

Joseph Stanley Beggs (November 4, 1910 – July 19, 1983), nicknamed "Fireman", was an American professional baseball pitcher. He played for the New York Yankees, Cincinnati Reds, and New York Giants of Major League Baseball. With the Reds, he was a member of the 1940 World Series champions. After his retirement from baseball, Beggs became the superintendent of prisons for Kentucky, and the director of urban renewal for Newport, Kentucky.

== Early life ==
Beggs was born on November 4, 1910, in Rankin, Pennsylvania. His family moved to Aliquippa, Pennsylvania, when he was young. He attended Aliquippa High School, where he lettered in football, baseball, and track and field. He played as a catcher for the baseball team into his junior year, until the team needed him to fill in as a pitcher. He threw a no-hitter in his first game as a pitcher and continued to pitch thereafter. He also won the Pennsylvania state championship in the javelin throw in 1929.

Beggs earned a track scholarship to Geneva College. He also played football at Geneva. At Geneva, he competed in the Penn Relays, finishing in second place in the javelin throw in consecutive years. He set a school record in the javelin throw at 206 feet (63 m). There was no baseball team at Geneva, so Beggs played sandlot baseball under an assumed name in Youngstown and then under his own name in Aliquippa. He graduated from Geneva in 1934 with a Bachelor of Arts.

== Professional career ==
After he graduated from Geneva, Beggs signed with the Pittsburgh Pirates, who gave him a brief trial with the Scranton Miners of the Class A New York–Pennsylvania League. After four days with Scranton, Beggs requested and received his release from the Pirates organization. A few weeks later, Gene Martin, a scout for the New York Yankees, signed Beggs. He went to Washington Generals of the Class D Pennsylvania State Association under Benny Bengough. In 1935, Beggs played for the Akron Yankees of the Class C Middle Atlantic League, and had a 15–14 win–loss record in 41 games pitched. He also received a late-season promotion to the Norfolk Tars of the Class B Piedmont League. The Yankees assigned Beggs to Norfolk in 1936, and he won 22 games. The Yankees promoted Beggs to the Newark Bears of the Class AA International League in 1937. He had a 21–4 record and a 2.61 earned run average (ERA) for Newark that year, and pitched to the win in Game 4 of the Junior World Series against the Columbus Red Birds. He also contributed to Newark's win in the decisive Game 7.

Beggs made his major league debut in April 1938. He had a 3–2 record and a 5.40 ERA in 58 1/3 innings pitched with the Yankees in 1938 before they sent him back to Newark, where he went 6–3 for the rest of the season. In 1939, he was 12–10 with a 3.80 ERA for Newark and did not pitch for the Yankees. The Yankees ran out of options on Beggs after the 1939 season, so they traded him to the Cincinnati Reds for Lee Grissom before the 1940 season. He had a 12–3 record and 2.00 ERA in 37 games pitched for the Reds, all of them but one as a relief pitcher, as the Reds won the 1940 World Series. He earned the nickname "Fireman" for his ability to "put out a threatening blaze" on the basepaths. Beggs continued to play as a relief pitcher from 1941 through 1943, though at his request, he appeared as a starting pitcher for a few games late in the 1943 season.

Beggs made one appearance for the Reds during the 1944 season, as a starting pitcher, before his career was interrupted by World War II. He enlisted in the United States Navy as a lieutenant. He missed the entire 1945 season. He returned to the Reds in 1946, and worked as a starting pitcher. He started for the Reds on Opening Day and won 12 games with a 2.32 ERA, which was the third-best in the National League.

The Reds traded Beggs to the New York Giants for Babe Young on June 7, 1947. He started the season with an 0–3 record in 11 appearances for the Reds, and went 3–3 for the Giants, with a combined ERA of 4.58. Beggs underwent surgery on his throwing arm during the 1947–48 offseason. He pitched one-third of an inning in 1948 for the Giants before they released him on May 10.

Later in May 1948, Beggs signed with the Yankees and was assigned to the Kansas City Blues of the American Association. In 1949, he became the manager of the Charleston Senators of the Class A Central League. Beggs managed Charleston for two years, and then managed the Bluefield Blue–Grays of the Class D Appalachian League in 1952.

== Personal life ==
Beggs married Ann (née Yargates) of Aliquippa in 1934. They had two daughters. Ann died after battling Lou Gehrig's disease. Beggs married Laura Royce Kerst of Indianapolis in 1974, and they moved to Indianapolis. Beggs spoke fluent Croatian, Serbian, Slovene, and Spanish; he also read Latin and studied French.

Following his baseball career, Beggs taught history and geography in public schools in Millford and Newport, Kentucky. He served as Kentucky's superintendent of prisons under Governor Happy Chandler, and became the director of urban renewal for Newport in 1959. He retired in 1970.

Beggs died of a heart attack on July 19, 1983, at St. Vincent's Hospital in Indianapolis. Beggs has been inducted into the halls of fame for Beaver County, Pennsylvania, and Newark, New Jersey.

== See also ==
- List of Major League Baseball annual saves leaders
