= Vandergrift Pioneers =

- 1947–1950; Vandergrift, Pennsylvania

Minor league affiliations
- Class: Class C (1947–1950)
- League: Middle Atlantic League (1947–1950)

Major league affiliations
- Team: Philadelphia Phillies (1947–1950)

Minor league titles
- League titles (1): 1947

Team data
- Name: Vandergrift Pioneers (1947–1950)
- Ballpark: Davis Field (1947–1950)

The Vandergrift Pioneers were a minor league baseball team based in Vandergrift, Pennsylvania from 1947 until 1950. The team played in the Middle Atlantic League and won the league title in 1947. The club was also a class-C affiliate of the Philadelphia Phillies throughout its existence. The Pioneers formally disbanded on July 20, 1950.

== Year-by-year record ==
Year	Record	Finish	Manager	Playoffs
1947	76-46	1st	Floyd "Pat" Patterson	League Champs defeated Erie Sailors 3 games to 0 defeated Butler Yankees 4 games to 0
1948	86-39	1st	Floyd "Pat" Patterson; Lew Krausse, Sr.	Lost League Finals defeated Uniontown Coal Barons 3 games to 1 lost to Erie Sailors 4 games to 1
1949	63-72	6th	George Savino	
1950	31-41	--	Don Hasenmayer	Team disbanded July 20
