= Oil City Oilers =

- 1940–1951; (1940–1941, 1946–1951); Oil City, Pennsylvania

Minor league affiliations
- Class: Class C (1946–1951); Class D (1940–1942)
- League: Middle Atlantic League (1946–1951); Pennsylvania State Association (1940–1942)

Major league affiliations
- Team: Chicago White Sox (1947–1950); Pittsburgh Pirates (1940–1942, 1946)

Team data
- Name: Oil City A's (1951); Oil City Refiners (1947–1950); Oil City Oilers (1940–1942, 1946)

The Oil City Oilers was a minor league baseball team located in Oil City, Pennsylvania between 1940 and 1951. The team played in the Pennsylvania State Association from 1940 to 1942, and later moved to the Middle Atlantic League after World War II ended. The team began in 1940 when the Pittsburgh Pirates relocated their affiliate, the McKeesport Little Braves, to Oil City. The team stayed affiliated with the Pirates until 1947, when it began an affiliation with the Chicago White Sox. That year, the team's name was changed to the Oil City Refiners. The team's name was changed one last time to the Oil City A's, when they merged with the Youngstown A's, in 1951. The team the folded, along with the league, at the end of that season.

The Oilers name originated from an earlier team that represented the city between 1895 and 1907, in the Iron And Oil League and the Interstate League.

== Notable alumni ==
- Otto Denning
- Mike Garbark
- Al Gionfriddo
- Elmer Klumpp
- Junior Walsh
- Hal Woodeshick
- Rudy York
