= Roy Nichols (baseball) =

American baseball player

- Infielder
- Born: March 3, 1921; Little Rock, Arkansas, U.S.
- Died: April 3, 2002 (aged 81); Hot Springs, Arkansas, U.S.
- Batted: Right Threw: Right

MLB debut
- May 6, 1944, for the New York Giants

Last MLB appearance
- October 1, 1944, for the New York Giants

MLB statistics
- Batting average: .222
- Home runs: 0
- Runs scored: 3
- Stats at Baseball Reference

Teams
- New York Giants (1944)

Roy Nichols (March 3, 1921 – April 3, 2002) was an American infielder in Major League Baseball who played in 11 games for the New York Giants during the 1944 baseball season. He later managed the Johnstown Johnnies of the Middle Atlantic League from 1948–1950.

Born in Little Rock, Arkansas, he died in Hot Springs, Arkansas, at age 81.
