= Ulicny =

Ulicny is a surname. Notable people with the surname include:

- Mike Ulicny (1917–2005), American baseball player
- Petr Uličný (born 1950), Czech football player and manager
