= Charleroi Tigers =

- 1927–1936; (1927–1931, 1934–1936); Charleroi, Pennsylvania

Minor league affiliations
- Previous classes: Class D (1934–1936); Class C (1927–1931)
- League: Pennsylvania State Association (1934–1936)
- Previous leagues: Middle Atlantic League (1927–1931)

Major league affiliations
- Previous teams: Detroit Tigers (1934–1936)

Team data
- Previous names: Charleroi Tigers (1934–1936); Charleroi Governors (1929–1931); Charleroi Babes (1927–1928)

The Charleroi Tigers were a minor league baseball team based in Charleroi, Pennsylvania from 1934 until 1936. However the team can be traced back to 1927 as the Charleroi Babes of the Middle Atlantic League. The name of the club changed in 1929 to the Charleroi Governors. The Governors ended play in the league in 1931; however, a Charleroi Tigers began play in 1934, as an affiliate of the Detroit Tigers, in the Pennsylvania State Association, and continued to play until 1936.

== Notable alumni ==
- Walt Bashore
- Allen Benson
- Slick Coffman
- Harry Gumbert
- Johnny Johnson
- Joe Klinger
- Danny Litwhiler
- Fred Lucas
- Roy Parmelee
- Bob Rice
- Maurice Van Robays
- Earl Smith
- Art Stokes
- Kemp Wicker
