= Scottdale Scotties =

- 1925–1931; Scottdale, Pennsylvania

Minor league affiliations
- Previous classes: Class C
- League: Middle Atlantic League

Major league affiliations
- Previous teams: St. Louis Cardinals (1929–1931)

Team data
- Previous names: Scottdale Cardinals (1931); Scottdale Scotties (1925–1930)

The Scottdale Scotties were a minor league baseball team located in Scottdale, Pennsylvania from 1925 until 1931. The club was a member of the class C Middle Atlantic League. The team was primarily named the Scotties; however, the club was renamed the Scottdale Cardinals in 1931. The team was affiliated with the St. Louis Cardinals from 1929 until 1931.

The team was managed by future St. Louis manager Eddie Dyer in 1929 and 1930. Also in 1930 future Hall of Famer Joe Medwick, played as an outfielder for the Scotties.

== Notable alumni ==
- Dick Attreau
- Dick Barrett
- Bill Beckmann
- Bill Bishop
- Ed Boland
- Jim Bucher
- Ed Chapman
- Ed Clough
- Bill Crouch
- George Durning
- Eddie Dyer
- Clarence Heise
- Bill Lee
- Joe Malay
- Joe Medwick
- Jo-Jo Morrissey
- Heinie Mueller
- Johnny Murphy
- Red Nonnenkamp
- Mike Ryba
- Dutch Schesler
- Paul Schreiber
- Bill Trotter
- Johnnie Tyler
- Bud Weiser
- Jim Winford

== Year-by-year record ==
Year	Record	Finish	Manager	Playoffs
1925	18-41	--	Joe Brahaney	none
1926	51-61	5th	Mike Mowrey	none
1927	57-54	5th	Moose Marshall	none
1928	40-76	8th	Mike Flaherty	none
1929	57-58	5th	Eddie Dyer	none
1930	59-55	4th	Eddie Dyer	none
1931	78-55	4th	Clay Hopper	none
