= Ted Toles Jr. =

American baseball player

- Pitcher / Outfielder
- Born: December 4, 1925; Braceville Township, Ohio, U.S.
- Died: April 4, 2016 (aged 90); Warren, Ohio, U.S.
- Batted: Switch hitter Threw: Left handed

Teams
- Pittsburgh Crawfords (1946); Newark Eagles (1947); Jacksonville Eagles (1947); Cleveland Buckeyes (1948–1949); Eston Ramblers (1950); New Castle Indians (1951); Magic Valley Cowboys (1952); Trois-Rivières Yankees (1953); St. Hyacinthe A's (1953)

Theodore Toles Jr. (December 4, 1925 – April 4, 2016) was an American pitcher and outfielder who played in Negro league baseball and the Minor Leagues. Listed at 6' 0" [1.83 m], 170 lb [77 kg], he was a switch hitter and threw left handed which is why he was referred to as 'Lefty' Toles.

== Career ==
'Ted', as he was dubbed, was born and raised in Braceville Township, Ohio. He was a graduate of Braceville High School, where he earned the title of valedictorian. Toles served in the US Army during World War II.

Toles began his professional baseball career with the Pittsburgh Crawfords in 1946, playing for them one year before joining the Newark Eagles, Jacksonville Eagles and Cleveland Buckeyes between 1947 and 1949. His most productive season came in 1946, when he posted a 18-7 pitching record while batting .350 as a part-time outfielder. Later that season, he earned an invitation to tour with the Jackie Robinson All-Stars team, where he played on the West-Coast portion of the trip.

In 1950, Toles joined the Eston Ramblers of the Western Canadian Baseball League. Afterwards, he played on the Minor League affiliates of the Cleveland Indians, New York Yankees and Philadelphia Athletics from 1951 through 1953, with stints with the New Castle Indians (1951), Magic Valley Cowboys (1952), Trois-Rivières Yankees and St. Hyacinthe A's (1953).

== After baseball ==
After his baseball days, Toles worked for Republic Steel/LTV Steel in Youngstown, Ohio for over 30 plus years before he retired. He then traveled around the country talking to young players about his experiences and how baseball shaped his life. During this time, he fostered reunions with old teammates and met new friends, obtaining the long overdue recognition he deserved. He was also often seen at Mahoning Valley Scrappers games, where he worked as an usher.

Toles received many citations and awards including, Ebony Sports Museum Lifeline All Sport Hall of Fame in Youngstown, OH (2001), Trumbull County African American Achievers Association in Warren, Ohio) (2007), Lifetime Achievement Award, National Association for the Advancement of Colored People (NAACP) in Lorain, Ohio (2008), his very own baseball card through the Topps Allen & Ginter Series (2007), a Harland Sports figurine (2008) and a Mahoning Valley Scrappers bobblehead (2009), among others.

In July 2014, Ted was invited to Miller Park as part of an annual Negro League Tribute Night, where he threw out the ceremonial first pitch in a Milwaukee Brewers home game. He then visited New Castle, Pennsylvania in February 2015, more than 60 years after his one-year stint playing with the Class C New Castle Indians. During his visit to New Castle, Toles promoted his book, Living on Borrowed Time: The Life and Times of Negro League Player Ted Toles Jr., which he co-wrote in 2014 with Michael T. Swank. In between, he spoke of his memories of July 21, 1951, when the Indians hosted the Ted Toles Night.

Even though Toles largely missed the golden years of Negro League Baseball, he had the chance to play side by side with eventual Hall of Famers Jackie Robinson, Larry Doby and Satchel Paige in groups of Negro League stars that faced different MLB All-Star teams during the offseason, being able to take part in one of the most significant society changes made in the 20th century, the integration of organized baseball.

Toles died in 2016 in Warren, Ohio, at the age of 90.

== Family ==
Parents: Ella Barnes and Theodore Toles

Spouse: Jean Bruton

Children: Evelyn Locket, Theodore Toles JR., Nelson Toles, Leslie Toles, Robert Toles, Lonnie Toles, Larry Toles

Grandchildren: Jeanette McKinney, Robert Toles JR., Ariel Toles Zerbe, Easton Locket, Bryonna Locket, Stacy Toles, Trianna Toles, Tamika Toles

Great Grandchildren: Jasmine McKinney, Jaela Bobb, Jamie McKinney, Jerimiah Bobb, Tymere Toles, Janasha Toles
