= Niagara Falls Citizens =

- 1939–1951; (1939–1940, 1946–1947, 1950–1951); Niagara Falls, New York

Minor league affiliations
- Class: Class C (1946–1947, 1950–1951); Class D (1939–1940)
- League: Middle Atlantic League (1946–1947, 1950–1951); PONY League (1939–1940)

Major league affiliations
- Team: Philadelphia Athletics (1947); Cleveland Indians (1939)

Minor league titles
- League titles (1): 1951

Team data
- Name: Niagara Falls Citizens (1950–1951); Niagara Falls Frontiers (1946–1947); Niagara Falls Rainbows (1939–1940)
- Ballpark: Sal Maglie Stadium

The Niagara Falls Citizens were a minor league baseball club, based in Niagara Falls, New York. The franchise can be traced back to 1939 when the Niagara Falls Rainbows were established and played as a charter member of the Pennsylvania–Ontario–New York League. The team was affiliated with the Cleveland Indians in 1939. However, on July 13, 1940, the team relocated to Jamestown, New York to become the Jamestown Falcons.

Niagara Falls went without a team until 1946, when the Niagara Falls Frontiers were established. The team played in the Middle Atlantic League as an affiliate of the Philadelphia Athletics in 1946 and 1947. However the team disbanded after a first-round playoff loss in 1947. Finally, the city fielded the Niagara Falls Citizens in 1950 to continue play in the Middle Atlantic League. In 1951 the Citizens won the league's final title, before disbanding.

Each of the Niagara Falls teams played their home games at Sal Maglie Stadium.

== Year-by-year record ==
| Year | Record | Finish | Manager | Playoffs |
|---|---|---|---|---|
| 1939 | 44-59 | 5th | Tim Murchison | |
| 1940 | 22-30 | NA | Joe O'Rourke & Joe Savant | Team moved to Jamestown on July 13, 1940 |
| 1946 | 64-66 | 4th | George Proechel & Bill Mongiello | Lost League Finals |
| 1947 | 68-55 | 2nd | Steve Mizerak | Lost in 1st round |
| 1950 | 48-69 | 6th | Mike Ulicny & Walter Chipple | |
| 1951 | 74-47 | 2nd | James Davis | League Champs |

== Notable alumni ==
- Sal Maglie (1940) 2 x MLB All-Star; 1950 NL ERA Leader
