= Washington Red Birds =

- 1934–1942; (1934–1935, 1939–1942); Washington, Pennsylvania

Minor league affiliations
- Class: Class D
- League: Pennsylvania State Association

Major league affiliations
- Team: St. Louis Cardinals (1939–1942); New York Yankees (1934–1935)

Minor league titles
- League titles (1): 1939

Team data
- Name: Washington Red Birds (1939–1942); Washington Generals (1934–1935)

The Washington Red Birds was the predominant name of a minor league baseball team located in Washington, Pennsylvania, between 1934 and 1942. The Red Birds played in the Pennsylvania State Association. Known as the Washington Generals in 1934 and 1935, the team was affiliated with the New York Yankees. After a four-year hiatus, the Red Birds represented Washington in the league, as an affiliate of the St. Louis Cardinals. The team and the league both disbanded in 1942, due to the strains of World War II.

== Notable alumni ==
- Joe Beggs
- Benny Bengough
- Don Bollweg
- Howie Gorman
- Hal Gregg
- Bill Kalfass
- Dutch Mele
- Mike Milosevich
- Bob Scheffing
- Dick Sisler
- Pete Suder
- George Washburn
