= Portsmouth Red Birds =

- 1935–1940; Portsmouth, Ohio

Minor league affiliations
- Previous classes: Class C
- League: Middle Atlantic League

Major league affiliations
- Previous teams: St. Louis Cardinals (1937–1940); Pittsburgh Pirates (1935–1936)

Minor league titles
- League titles: 1 (1938)

Team data
- Previous names: Portsmouth Red Birds (1937–1940); Portsmouth Pirates (1935–1936)

The Portsmouth Red Birds were a minor league baseball club, located in Portsmouth, Ohio. The team played in the Class C Middle Atlantic League between 1935 and 1940. During the club's first two seasons, it was known as the Portsmouth Pirates, as a minor league affiliate of the Pittsburgh Pirates. In 1937 the team became affiliated with the St. Louis Cardinals and were then renamed the Portsmouth Red Birds. The team won the Middle Atlantic League in 1938. Before the 1941 season, the team was moved to Springfield, Ohio and became the Springfield Cardinals.

== Year-by-year record ==
Year	Record	Finish	Manager	Notes
1935	54-63	6th	Jake Pitler	
1936	40-88	8th	Eddie Kenna	
1937	72-57	3rd	Benny Borgmann	Lost in 1st round
1938	79-50	1st	Benny Borgmann	League Champs
1939	61-69	5th	Joe Davis	
1940	59-68	6th	Dutch Dorman & Walter Alston	
