= Como Cotelle =

American baseball player

Como Cotelle (November 5, 1904 – December 27, 1975) was an American professional baseball outfielder. Cottelle played in Minor League Baseball from 1926 to 1945, collecting 2,730 hits with a .323 career batting average.

== Baseball career ==
Cotelle was born in St. James, Louisiana, on November 5, 1904. An outfielder, he started his professional baseball career in 1926 with the Mississippi Valley League's Rock Island Islanders. He had a .336 batting average. That season, he was also a pitcher for 125 innings, compiling a win-loss record of 7–8. He never pitched regularly in a season again. In 1927, Cotelle played for the Mississippi Valley League's Marshalltown Ansons and batted .318. In 1928, he played for the Danville Veterans of the Illinois–Indiana–Iowa League and batted .324. He played for multiple teams during each season from 1929 to 1932.

In 1933, Cotelle played for the Davenport Blue Sox of the Mississippi Valley League. He batted .407 to win the batting title, with 106 runs scored and 31 stolen bases. The Blue Sox won both the first half and second half of the regular season, finishing with a record of 82–32. Then, they defeated the second-place team in the playoffs and won the league championship. MILB.com ranked the 1933 Davenport Blue Sox as the 58th-best minor league team of all time.

Cotelle played for the American Association's Indianapolis Indians in 1934 and 1935, batting .300 and .320 in those years. He played for multiple teams in 1936. In 1937, Cotelle played for the Albany Senators of the New York–Pennsylvania League and batted .338 to win the batting title. The following season, he played for the Albany Senators of the Eastern League, batting .275. In 1939, he played for the Eastern League's Williamsport Grays and batted .296.

From 1940 to 1945, Cotelle played for multiple teams every season except 1942, when he batted .327 for the Middle Atlantic League's Erie Sailors to led the league in hitting. He had won the 1941 Middle Atlantic League batting title the previous year, while splitting the season between Erie and the Dayton Ducks, hitting .367. He was ineligible for the military draft. Cotelle's Minor League Baseball career ended in 1945. He finished his professional career with 2,730 hits and a .323 batting average. He never played in Major League Baseball.

Cotelle died in Chicago, Illinois, on December 27, 1975.
