= Fred Lucas (baseball) =

American baseball player (1903–1987)

- Outfielder
- Born: January 19, 1903; Vineland, New Jersey, U.S.
- Died: March 11, 1987 (aged 84); Cambridge, Maryland, U.S.
- Batted: Right Threw: Right

MLB debut
- July 15, 1935, for the Philadelphia Phillies

Last MLB appearance
- September 24, 1935, for the Philadelphia Phillies

MLB statistics
- Batting average: .265
- Home runs: 0
- Runs batted in: 2
- Stats at Baseball Reference

Teams
- Philadelphia Phillies (1935)

Frederick Warrington Lucas [Fritz] (January 19, 1903 – March 11, 1987) was an American outfielder in Major League Baseball who played briefly for the Philadelphia Phillies during the 1935 season. Listed at 5 ft 10 in (1.78 m), 165 lb, Lucas batted and threw right-handed. He was born in Vineland, New Jersey.

At age 32, it had been a long journey to the major leagues for Lucas. He started his minor league career in 1923 with the Martinsburg Blue Sox, playing for them one year before joining the Bridgeport Bears (1924-'25), Scranton Miners (1925-'26), York White Roses (1926), Columbus Senators (1926), Charleroi Babes/Governors (1927-'29), Houston Buffaloes (1930) and Rochester Red Wings (1930). He won the Triple Crown of the Middle Atlantic League while playing for the Governors in 1929.

Lucas joined the Phillies in the 1935 midseason as a reserve outfielder for Ethan Allen, George Watkins and Johnny Moore. He went 9-for-34 for a .265 average in 20 games (10 as a pinch-hitter), including two runs batted in while scoring one run without extrabases.

After that, Lucas returned to minor league action with the Cambridge Cardinals (1937) and Union Springs Redbirds (1938). In ten minors seasons, he hit a .307 average with 39 home runs in 805 games. He later managed the Cambridge team in 1938 and 1939 and the Hamilton Red Wings in 1940.

Lucas was a longtime resident of Cambridge, Maryland, where he died at the age of 84.

== See also ==
- 1935 Philadelphia Phillies season
