= Johnstown Johnnies (1883–1961) =

- 1883–1961; (1883–1884, 1887, 1892–1893, 1895, 1898, 1904–1912, 1925–1942, 1946–1950, 1955–1956, 1961); Johnstown, Pennsylvania

Minor league affiliations
- Previous classes: Class A (1955–1956, 1961); Class C (1946–1950); Class D (1939–1942); Class C (1925–1938); Class B (1892, 1895, 1907–1912)
- Previous leagues: Eastern League (1955–1956, 1961); Middle Atlantic League (1946–1950); Pennsylvania State Association (1939–1942); Middle Atlantic League (1925–1938); Tri-State League (1905–1912); Pennsylvania League (1904); New York State League (1898); Pennsylvania State League (1892, 1893); Pennsylvania State Association (1887); Iron & Oil Association (1884); Western Interstate League (1883)

Major league affiliations
- Previous teams: Boston Red Sox (1961); New York Giants (1955–1956); Brooklyn Dodgers (1940–1942, 1946–1949); Philadelphia Phillies (1939); St. Louis Browns (1937–1938)

Minor league titles
- League titles: 3 (1925, 1926, 1930)

Team data
- Previous names: Johnstown Red Sox (1961); Johnstown Johnnies (1904–1912, 1925–1942, 1946–1950, 1955–1956); Johnstown Mormans (1898); Johnstown Terrors (1893); Johnstown Pirates (1892); Johnstown Baseball Club (1883–1884, 1887)
- Previous parks: Point Stadium (1926–1942, 1946–1950, 1955–1956, 1961)

The Johnstown Johnnies were a minor league baseball team in Johnstown, Pennsylvania, that existed in various leagues between 1883 and 2002.

== History ==
The first Johnstown team played in 1883 in the Western Interstate League and 1884 in the Iron & Oil Association. A few years later, the Johnstown Pirates/Terrors played in the Pennsylvania State League. The Johnstown Mormans in 1898 played in the New York State League.

The first version of the team named the Johnnies played in 1904 in the independent Pennsylvania League, which merged to become the Tri-State League the following year. This team moved to Chester, Pennsylvania during the 1912 season. The Johnnies resurfaced in the Middle Atlantic League in 1925 and played continuously through 1942, when they had to temporarily suspend playing due to World War II. After the war, the team started up again in 1946 before dissolving in 1950.

The Wilkes-Barre Barons moved to Johnstown during the 1955 season and became the latest version of the Johnnies but only lasted two seasons. In 1961, the Boston Red Sox had an affiliate in Johnstown named the Johnstown Red Sox. Eddie Popowski managed the team. Multiple notable players spent time with the Johnstown Red Sox, including Guido Grilli, Bob Heffner, Jerry Mallett, Al Moran, Dave Morehead, Ted Schreiber, Pete Smith, Bill Spanswick and Wilbur Wood.

A new version of the team, known first as the Steal and then the Johnnies played in the Frontier League from 1995 to 2002 before moving to Florence, Kentucky and becoming the Florence Freedom.

== The ballpark ==
Johnstown teams played at Point Stadium beginning in 1926. "The Point" is still in use today after undergoing major renovations in 1995 and 2005. The stadium serves as home to the All-American Amateur Baseball Association Hall of Fame and has served as host to the AAABA Tournament since 1946. The address of Point Stadium is 100 Johns Street, Johnstown, Pennsylvania, 15901.

== Notable alumni ==
- Chief Bender (1926) Inducted Baseball Hall of Fame, 1953
- Joe Cronin (1925) Inducted Baseball Hall of Fame, 1956
- Babe Adams (1927–1928)
- Joey Amalfitano (1956)
- Johnny Berardino (1937)
- Ernie Broglio (1956) 1960 NL Wins Leader
- Ripper Collins (1925–1926) 3x MLB All-Star
- Jack Fournier (1938, MGR)
- Wilbur Good (1905–1906), (1930–1931, MGR)
- Hans Lobert (1904–1905)
- Mike McCormick (1955, Player/MGR)
- Eddie Mayo (1934) 2x MLB All-Star
- Jack Quinn (1935, Player/MGR)
- Vern Stephens (1938) 8x MLB All-Star
- Valmy Thomas (1956)
- Wilbur Wood (1961) 3x MLB All-Star
