= Butler Tigers =

- 1935–1951; (1935–1942, 1946–1951); Butler, Pennsylvania

Minor league affiliations
- Class: Class C (1946–1951); Class D (1935–1942)
- League: Middle Atlantic League (1946–1951); Pennsylvania State Association (1935–1942)

Major league affiliations
- Team: Pittsburgh Pirates (1951); Detroit Tigers (1949–1950); New York Yankees (1936–1942, 1946–1948); Cleveland Indians (1935)

Minor league titles
- League titles (6): 1937; 1938; 1940; 1941; 1942; 1950

Team data
- Name: Butler Tigers (1949–1951); Butler Yankees (1936–1942, 1946–1948); Butler Indians (1935)
- Ballpark: Pullman Park

The Butler Tigers were a Pennsylvania State Association (1935–1942) and Middle Atlantic League (1946–1951) baseball team based in Butler, Pennsylvania. The team was founded in 1935, as the Butler Indians, an affiliate of the Cleveland Indians. They began their affiliation with the New York Yankees the following season, as the Butler Yankees.

They lasted ten seasons as the Yankees, and won league championships in five of those years. The first two came in 1937 and 1938 under manager Ernie Jenkins. The next two occurred in 1940 and 1941 under Thomas Kain and the third occurred in 1942 under Dallas Warren. In 1949 the team became the Butler Tigers, as an affiliate of the Detroit Tigers. In 1951, the team became an affiliate of the Pittsburgh Pirates.

Notable players include Bob Grim, Joe Page, Hank Sauer and Hall of Famer Whitey Ford.
