= Earl Wolgamot =

American baseball player, coach and scout (1892–1970)

- Coach
- Born: December 21, 1892; Fairbank, Iowa, US
- Died: April 25, 1970 (aged 77); Independence, Iowa, US
- Batted: Right Threw: Right

Teams
- Cleveland Indians (1931–1935)

Clinton Earl Wolgamot (December 21, 1892 – April 25, 1970) was an American professional baseball catcher, coach and manager. In Major League Baseball, he was a coach for the Cleveland Indians from 1931 to 1935.

== Biography ==
Born on December 21, 1892, in Fairbank, Iowa, he threw and batted right-handed and was listed as 5 feet 8 inches (1.73 m) tall and 162 pounds (73 kg). Wolgamot began his playing career in 1915, became a player-manager in 1929 in the minors, and appeared in his last games in 1938 at age 45. Though statistical information is incomplete, it is known that he played in at least 909 games and collected at least 716 career hits. As well, he hit at least 36 home runs, 144 doubles and 27 triples.

He began his managerial career by skippering the 1929 Terre Haute Tots through 1930. As a coach in Cleveland, he worked under managers Roger Peckinpaugh and Baseball Hall of Famer Walter Johnson. In 1934, he managed for the Grand Rapids Tigers, Monessen Indians and Zanesville Grays. After taking over the Grays partway through the season, he led them to a league championship. He managed the Grays until 1936, leading them to another league championship in his final year with the team. He moved onto the Springfield Indians in 1937 and managed them until 1939, leading them to the playoffs each year. From 1940 to 1942, he managed the Wilkes-Barre Barons, leading them to the playoffs twice. In 1943, he managed the Batavia Clippers, in 1944 and 1945 he managed the Springfield Giants (leading them to the playoffs both times), in 1947 he managed the Trenton Giants and in 1948 he managed the Fort Smith Giants.

From 1939 through 1941, he managed future Hall of Fame pitcher Bob Lemon at Springfield and Wilkes-Barre, while Lemon was still an infielder; he converted to full-time pitching with Cleveland after World War II.
