= Frank Welch (baseball) =

American baseball player (1897–1957)

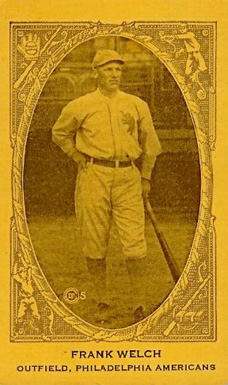
- Outfielder
- Born: August 10, 1897; Birmingham, Alabama, U.S.
- Died: July 25, 1957 (aged 59); Birmingham, Alabama, U.S.
- Batted: Right Threw: Right

MLB debut
- September 9, 1919, for the Philadelphia Athletics

Last MLB appearance
- August 13, 1927, for the Boston Red Sox

MLB statistics
- Batting average: .274
- Home runs: 41
- Runs batted in: 295
- Stats at Baseball Reference

Teams
- Philadelphia Athletics (1919–1926); Boston Red Sox (1927)

Frank Tigner Welch (August 10, 1897 – July 25, 1957) was an outfielder in Major League Baseball who played from 1919 through 1927 for the Philadelphia Athletics (1919–1926) and Boston Red Sox (1927). Listed at 5' 9", 175 lb., Welch batted and threw right-handed. He was born in Birmingham, Alabama.

In a nine-season career, Welch was a .274 hitter (634-for-2310) with 41 home runs and 295 RBI in 738 games, including 310 runs, 100 doubles, 31 triples, 18 stolen bases, and a .350 on-base percentage. On October 1, 1921, Welch became the last person to hit a home run off Babe Ruth in a major league game; the homer was the 10th and last the Babe would ever allow as a pitcher. After retiring from baseball, Welch was employeed with Spalding Brothers Sporting Goods.

Welch died at the age of 59 in his hometown of Birmingham, Alabama.
