= New Castle Indians =

- 1948–1951; New Castle, Pennsylvania

Minor league affiliations
- Class: Class C (1948–1951)
- League: Middle Atlantic League (1948–1951)

Major league affiliations
- Team: Washington Senators (1949–1950)

Team data
- Name: New Castle Indians (1951); New Castle Nats (1949-50); New Castle Chiefs (1948)
- Ballpark: Flaherty Field

The New Castle Indians were a minor league baseball team based in New Castle, Pennsylvania, as a member of the Middle Atlantic League. The team began play in 1948 as the New Castle Chiefs. In 1949 and 1950, the team became known as the New Castle Nats and were a Class C minor league affiliate of the Washington Senators. The team finally took up the Indians moniker in 1951, their final season.

== Year-by-year record ==
Year	Record	Finish	Manager	Playoffs
1948	43-83	7th	Robert Crow, Frankie Pytlak & Carl Miller	
1949	54-82	8th	Bill Mongiello	
1950	64-54	4th	Charles Cronin	Lost in 1st round
1951	61-58	3rd	Al Milnar	
