= Jackie Warner (baseball) =

American baseball player (born 1943)

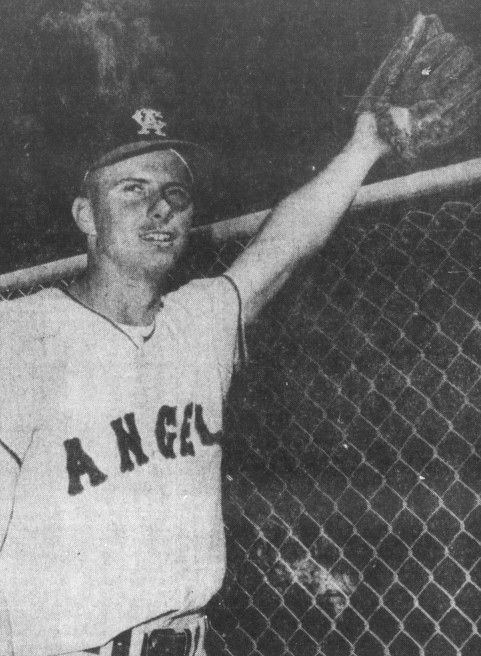
- Right fielder
- Born: August 1, 1943 (age 82); Monrovia, California, U.S.
- Batted: Right Threw: Right

MLB debut
- April 12, 1966, for the California Angels

Last MLB appearance
- July 27, 1966, for the California Angels

MLB statistics
- Batting average: .211
- Home runs: 7
- Runs batted in: 16
- Stats at Baseball Reference

Teams
- California Angels (1966)

John Joseph "Jackie" Warner (born August 1, 1943 in Monrovia, California) is an American former Major League Baseball player. Warner played for the California Angels in the 1966 season as a right fielder. He played in 45 games in his one-year career. Warner had a .211 batting average, with 26 hits in 123 at-bats.

In 1967, Warner was traded to the Kansas City Athletics with Jack Sanford for Roger Repoz, but never played in a game for them.
