= Dayton Ducks =

- 1932–1942; Dayton, Ohio

Minor league affiliations
- Previous classes: Class C (1933–1942); Class B (1932)
- League: Middle Atlantic League (1933–1942); Central League (1932)

Major league affiliations
- Previous teams: Brooklyn Dodgers (1938–1942); Chicago White Sox (1937); Brooklyn Dodgers (1934–1935)

Minor league titles
- League titles: 1 (1932)

Team data
- Previous names: Dayton Ducks (1932–1938, 1941–1942); Dayton Wings (1939–1940)
- Previous parks: Hudson Field; North Side Field

The Dayton Ducks were a minor league baseball team that played in the Central League in 1932 and then the Middle Atlantic League from 1933–1942. The team took its name from their owner and field manager, former St. Louis Cardinals player Ducky Holmes. They were affiliated with the Brooklyn Dodgers from 1934–35, 1938–1942 and the Chicago White Sox in 1937. The team was briefly known as the Dayton Wings from 1939–1940, when Holmes was not involved with the club.

== The ballparks ==
The team played at North Side Field and then Hudson Field. North side field was located at Leo Street and Troy Pike. Hudson Field was located at West Third Street and was near the Soldiers Home.

== Notable alumni ==
- Como Cotelle (1940)
- Rod Dedeaux (1935) Manager: 11 x NCAA College World Series Champion USC Trojans
- Frank McCormick (1935) 9 x MLB All-Star; 1940 NL Most Valuable Player
- Dick Siebert (1932, 1934) MLB All-Star
- Phil Weintraub (1932)
- Johnny Vander Meer (1933)
