= Lou Lucier =

American baseball player (1918–2014)

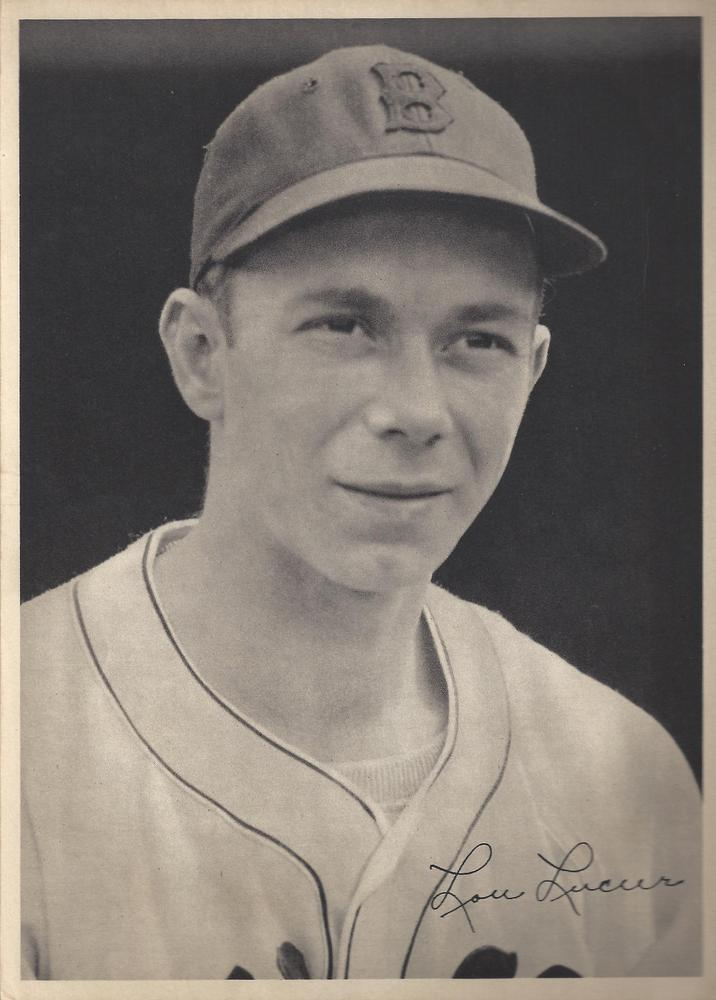
- Pitcher
- Born: March 23, 1918; Northbridge, Massachusetts, U.S.
- Died: October 18, 2014 (aged 96); Millbury, Massachusetts, U.S.
- Batted: Right Threw: Right

MLB debut
- April 23, 1943, for the Boston Red Sox

Last MLB appearance
- June 13, 1945, for the Philadelphia Phillies

MLB statistics
- Win–loss record: 3–5
- Earned run average: 3.81
- Strikeouts: 31
- Stats at Baseball Reference

Teams
- Boston Red Sox (1943–1944); Philadelphia Phillies (1944–1945)

Louis Joseph Lucier (March 23, 1918 – October 18, 2014) was an American professional baseball player. He played in Major League Baseball (MLB) as a pitcher for the Boston Red Sox and Philadelphia Phillies. He is one of many ballplayers who only appeared in the major leagues during World War II.

== Biography ==
Lucier was born in 1918 in Northbridge, Massachusetts. Raised in Grafton, Massachusetts, he graduated from high school there in 1936. During his baseball career, he was listed at 5 feet 8 inches (1.73 m) and 160 pounds (73 kg).

Lucier made his major-league debut on April 23, 1943, pitching for the Boston Red Sox in relief against the Philadelphia Athletics at Shibe Park, giving up one run and one hit in two innings of work. His first major-league start was the second game of a doubleheader against the Chicago White Sox at Comiskey Park on May 16, 1943—he was the winning pitcher in a 4–2 complete game effort. After pitching for the Red Sox in 1943, Lucier split 1944 between the Red Sox and the Philadelphia Phillies, then pitched for the Phillies in 1945.

Career totals include 33 games pitched, 9 starts, 3 complete games, an overall 3–5 win–loss record, 1 save, and an earned run average (ERA) of 3.81. Lucier handled 45 of 46 total chances successfully for a fielding percentage of .978, which was above the league average at the time.

From 2012 until his death in 2014, Lucier was the oldest living former Red Sox player.
