= Mike Ulicny =

American baseball player (1917-2005)

- Ulicny with the New Orleans Pelicans, c. 1944
- Catcher
- Born: September 28, 1917; Greenwald, Pennsylvania, U.S.
- Died: September 22, 2005 (aged 87); New Smyrna Beach, Florida, U.S.
- Batted: Right Threw: Right

MLB debut
- May 5, 1945, for the Boston Braves

Last MLB appearance
- June 22, 1945, for the Boston Braves

MLB statistics
- Batting average: .389
- Home runs: 1
- Runs batted in: 4
- Stats at Baseball Reference

Teams
- Boston Braves (1945)

Michael Edward Ulicny (September 28, 1917 – September 22, 2005), nicknamed "Slugs", was an American professional baseball catcher. He played in Major League Baseball (MLB) for the Boston Braves in 1945. Listed at 5 feet 9 inches (1.75 m) and 165 pounds (75 kg), he was a native of Greenwald, Pennsylvania.

== Biography ==
Ulicny's professional baseball career spanned 1938 to 1950; he appeared in a total of 886 minor league games. He is one of many ballplayers who only appeared in the major leagues during World War II. He hit well in the 11 games he played for the Boston Braves, going 7-for-18, a .389 batting average. He had one home run, four runs batted in (RBIs), four runs scored, and a .611 slugging percentage. He was mainly used as a pinch-hitter, appearing in only four games as a catcher. His uncommon last name sometimes appeared in newspaper box scores of the era as "Ulisney". In 1950, he served as player-manager of the minor league Niagara Falls Citizens.

Ulicny served in the United States Army during World War II, including in 1943 when he was stationed at Fort Dix (New Jersey) and Camp Gordon Johnston (Florida) and did not play baseball professionally. He died at the age of 87 in New Smyrna Beach, Florida. He is buried at Deltona Memorial Gardens in Orange City, Florida.
