= Akron Yankees =

- 1935–1941; Akron, Ohio

Minor league affiliations
- Class: Class C (1935–1941)
- League: Middle Atlantic League (1935–1941)

Major league affiliations
- Team: New York Yankees (1935–1941)

Minor league titles
- League titles (1): 1940

Team data
- Name: Akron Yankees (1935–1941)
- Ballpark: League Park (1935–1941)

The Akron Yankees were a minor league baseball team that existed from 1935 until 1941. A Class C farm team of the New York Yankees, the club was based in Akron, Ohio and played in the Middle Atlantic League.

== Year-by-year record ==
Year	Record	Finish	Manager	Notes
1935	64-59	4th	Johnny Neun	
1936	64-63	5th	Nick Allen	
1937	64-61	4th	Leo Mackey	Lost League Finals
1938	66-62	4th	Pip Koehler	Lost League Finals
1939	69-61	3rd	Pip Koehler	Lost in 1st round
1940	73-54	1st	Pip Koehler	League Champs
1941	77-48	1st	Buzz Boyle	Lost in 1st round
