= Otto Denning =

American baseball player (1912–1992)

- Catcher/First baseman
- Born: December 28, 1912; Hays, Kansas, U.S.
- Died: May 25, 1992 (aged 79); Chicago, Illinois, U.S.
- Batted: Right Threw: Right

MLB debut
- April 15, 1942, for the Cleveland Indians

Last MLB appearance
- June 4, 1943, for the Cleveland Indians

MLB statistics
- Batting average: .222
- Home runs: 1
- Runs batted in: 32
- Stats at Baseball Reference

Teams
- Cleveland Indians (1942–1943)

Otto George Denning (December 28, 1912 – May 25, 1992) was an American professional baseball player and manager. His 20-year (1932–51) career was confined to minor league baseball except for 129 games at the Major League level during the World War II manpower shortage for the 1942–43 Cleveland Indians. He was a native of Hays, Kansas, and attended high school in Chicago, Illinois.

Nicknamed "Dutch," Denning was a 6 ft (1.83 m), 180 lb (82 kg) catcher and first baseman who threw and batted right-handed. He began his pro baseball career in 1932 with the Davenport Blue Sox in the Class D Mississippi Valley League. In 1938, he joined the Minneapolis Millers of the top-level American Association and finished second to teammate Ted Williams in the league's batting race. He hit over .300 for Minneapolis for four consecutive seasons, then was selected by the Indians in the 1941 Rule 5 Draft.

Denning made his big-league debut on April 15, 1942 against the Detroit Tigers, and lashed two hits in four at bats, including a double, off Dizzy Trout in a 6–2 Cleveland defeat. He started at catcher again the following day, and went one for two, with another double (off Tommy Bridges). But, although he was the Indians' most-used catcher (playing ahead of rookie and eventual Cleveland stalwart Jim Hegan and veteran Gene Desautels), Denning's production declined as the season wore on. He batted only .210 in 92 games, and, in 1943 he served as the Indians' reserve first baseman (backing up Mickey Rocco) through June 4, when he returned to the minor leagues for the remainder of his on-field career.

In the Majors, Denning collected 76 hits, with 20 doubles and one home run, struck on May 4, 1942, at Fenway Park off Dick Newsome of the Boston Red Sox. He became a player-manager in the minors in 1948 in the Chicago White Sox organization, retiring as an active player in 1950 before spending a final season, 1951, as a non-playing skipper.

== Personal ==
Denning was the uncle of outfielder Chris Bourjos and great-uncle of outfielder Peter Bourjos.
