= Youngstown Athletics =

- 1939–1951; (1939–1941, 1946–1951); Youngstown, Ohio

Minor league affiliations
- Previous classes: Class C
- League: Middle Atlantic League (1939–1941, 1946–1951)

Major league affiliations
- Previous teams: Philadelphia Athletics (1949–1950); St. Louis Browns (1939–1941)

Team data
- Previous names: Youngstown/Oil City Athletics (1951); Youngstown Athletics (1949–1950); Youngstown Colts (1947–1948); Youngstown Gremlins (1946); Youngstown Browns (1939–1941)
- Previous parks: Idora Park

The Youngstown Athletics, or Youngstown A's, was the final name of a baseball team in the Mid-Atlantic League that was based in Youngstown, Ohio, between 1939 and 1941 and 1946 and 1951.

== Youngstown Browns: 1939–1941 ==
The team was first established as the Youngstown Browns, an affiliate of the St. Louis Browns, in 1939. The team's overall performance was uneven, but it peaked during its second season.

In 1939, the Browns ranked seventh in the eight-team league, but the team rebounded the following year. In 1940, the Browns were poised to take the championship but lost to the Akron Yankees. The Browns disbanded when the Mid-Atlantic League suspended operations at the outset of America's entry into World War II. The team is best remembered for its role in launching the career of major league player Floyd Baker, who married a Youngstown native and made the city his honorary hometown.

== Youngstown Gremlins and Colts: 1946–1948 ==
After the war, Youngstown fielded a new team for the Middle Atlantic League, the Youngstown Gremlins. The club made its debut in 1946, the sixth consecutive season in which the National Amateur Baseball Federation tournament was held in Youngstown, Ohio. The team was owned by the Pittsburgh sportsmen Bill Koval and Nick Andolina, who "bankrolled" the reorganization of the Mid-Atlantic League in 1946. The team went 67–62, good for third place in the six-team league. They were defeated in the first round of the playoffs, three games to one, to the Erie Sailors. The owners acknowledged that the team had been a losing venture at the close of the 1946 season but indicated to Frank Ward, sports editor of The Youngstown Daily Vindicator, that they would continue to sponsor the club in 1947.

Youngstown's star performer was Johnny Kucab, who eventually moved on to the major leagues. As a pitcher for the Gremlins, Kucab posted a 13–1 record, followed up by 12–4. He had the best winning percentage and pitched four shutouts in his 15 starts, tying him for second in the Mid-Atlantic League in whitewashes. Kucab was brought up by the Philadelphia Athletics in 1951.

The team was renamed as the Youngstown Colts in 1947. The Gremlins' brief run coincided with the 33rd NABF sandlot "world series", which won recognition for Youngstown among national observers. A local newspaper editorial stated: "If any other city has comparable equipment, it is not generally known. Baseball Commissioner Chandler exclaimed in surprise that our sandlot fields are better than the parks of many professional teams".

== Youngstown Athletics: 1949–1951 ==
In 1949 the team's name changed to Youngstown Athletics and the team enjoyed a working relationship with the Philadelphia Athletics. The team posted a 74–64 record, for third-place in the league in 1949. The following year the team posted a 51–61 record, for fourth-place. However the 1951 season, would be the team's last as the club relocated to Oil City, Pennsylvania on June 2, 1951. The Oil City club then disbanded 2 months later on August 6. That year also turned out to be the last for the Mid-Atlantic League, as the organization soon folded. Minor league baseball would not return to the Mahoning Valley until 1999, when nearby Niles, Ohio became the home for the Cleveland Indians’ affiliate in the New York–Penn League, the Mahoning Valley Scrappers.
