= Kemp Wicker =

American baseball player (1906-1973)

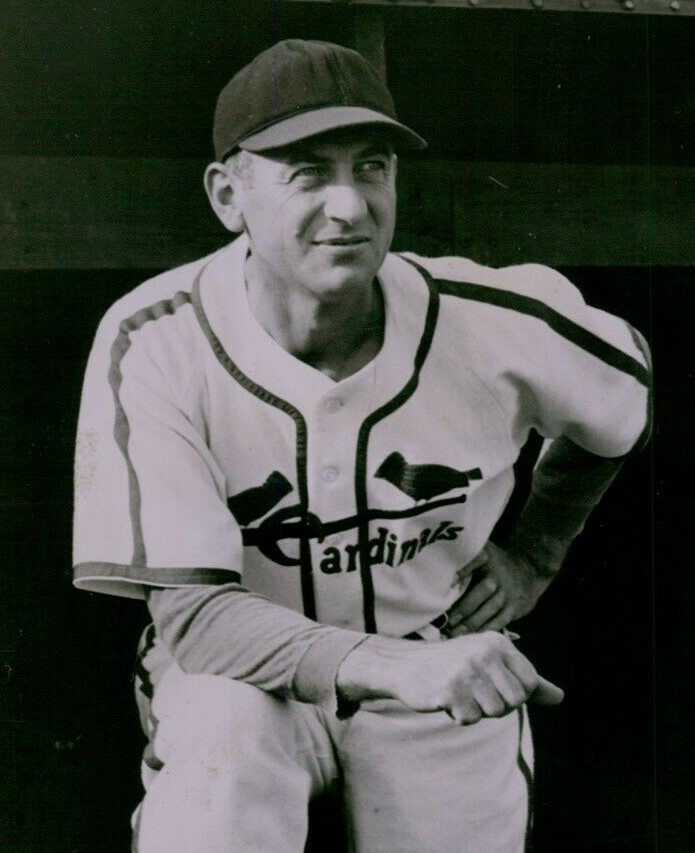
- Wicker in 1948
- Pitcher
- Born: August 13, 1906; Kernersville, North Carolina, U.S.
- Died: June 11, 1973 (aged 66); Kernersville, North Carolina, U.S.
- Batted: Right Threw: Left

MLB debut
- August 14, 1936, for the New York Yankees

Last MLB appearance
- July 31, 1941, for the Brooklyn Dodgers

MLB statistics
- Win–loss record: 10–7
- Earned run average: 4.66
- Strikeouts: 27
- Stats at Baseball Reference

Teams
- New York Yankees (1936–1938); Brooklyn Dodgers (1941)

Career highlights and awards
- 2× World Series champion (1936, 1937)

Kemp Caswell Wicker (born Kemp Caswell Whicker; August 13, 1906 – June 11, 1973) was an American left-handed pitcher in Major League Baseball who played for the New York Yankees from 1936 to 1938 and the Brooklyn Dodgers in 1941.

Wicker was born in Kernersville, North Carolina to Jasper Newton and Alice Crews Wicker. He played collegiately at North Carolina State University. He is most known for pitching one inning in the 1937 World Series for the Yankees.

After retiring from baseball, Wicker became the owner and operator of a restaurant in Burlington Mills. He continued in that position until his retirement in 1967. He died at his home in Kernersville, North Carolina on June 11, 1973 due to complications of amyotrophic lateral sclerosis at age 66, the same disease that claimed his teammate Lou Gehrig.
