= Don Hasenmayer =

American baseball player (1927–2020)

- Third baseman/Second baseman
- Born: April 4, 1927; Roslyn, Pennsylvania, U.S.
- Died: January 28, 2020 (aged 92); Warrington, Pennsylvania, U.S.
- Batted: Right Threw: Right

MLB debut
- May 2, 1945, for the Philadelphia Phillies

Last MLB appearance
- September 29, 1946, for the Philadelphia Phillies

MLB statistics
- Batting average: .100
- Home runs: 0
- Runs batted in: 1
- Stats at Baseball Reference

Teams
- Philadelphia Phillies (1945–1946)

Donald Irvin Hasenmayer (April 4, 1927 – January 28, 2020) was an American professional baseball player. He was an infielder over parts of two seasons (1945–46) with the Philadelphia Phillies. For his career, he compiled a .100 batting average in 30 at-bats, with one run batted in. He was born in Roslyn, Pennsylvania and attended Abington Senior High School. He was a navy veteran of World War II. Hasenmayer died on January 28, 2020.
