= Ed Chapman (baseball) =

American baseball player (1905–2000)

- Pitcher
- Born: November 28, 1905; Courtland, Mississippi, U.S.
- Died: May 3, 2000 (aged 94); Clarksdale, Mississippi, U.S.
- Batted: Both Threw: Right

MLB debut
- August 6, 1933, for the Washington Senators

Last MLB appearance
- October 1, 1933, for the Washington Senators

MLB statistics
- Win–loss record: 0-0
- Earned run average: 8.00
- Strikeouts: 4
- Stats at Baseball Reference

Teams
- Washington Senators (1933)

Edwin Volney Chapman (November 28, 1905 – May 3, 2000) was an American Major League Baseball pitcher who played for the Washington Senators in 1933.
