= Pennsylvania State Association =

Defunct American baseball league

- Classification: Class D (1935–1942)
- Sport: Minor League Baseball
- First season: 1934
- Folded: 1942
- President: Elmer M. Daily (1935–1942, 1946–1951)
- No. of teams: 11
- Country: United States of America
- Most titles: 5 Butler Yankees

The Pennsylvania State Association was a class D level league of minor league baseball that existed from 1934 until 1942. The league franchises were entirely based in Western Pennsylvania.

== History ==
The first iteration of the Pennsylvania State Association of Base Ball Clubs was inaugurated on April 1st, 1896, with a constitution and league rules based on the American Association. The league collapsed in the 1897 season when Scranton and Wilkes-Barre left in favor of the International Association.

The minor league baseball league of the same name was formed in 1934 and persisted until 1942. The Pennsylvania State Association was composed mostly of major-league affiliate teams. During the nine-year run of the league there were eleven cities, all from Pennsylvania, that represented the league. Elmer M. Daily served as president of the league the full nine years of its existence. The Butler Yankees won five of the league's nine championships, winning back-to-back titles in 1937 and 1938 and winning the final three titles for the league in 1940, 1941 and 1942. There were at least sixteen known players from the league who managed to make it to the majors. Also, in the league, there were some twenty-one team managers who had been affiliated with a major league team, during their baseball careers. The Pennsylvania State Association did not restart after World War II and it has been dormant since that time.

== Cities represented ==
The Pennsylvania State Association had teams playing in eleven western PA. cities
- Beaver Falls, PA: Beaver Falls Bees 1937; Beaver Falls Browns 1938; Beaver Falls Bees 1939; Beaver Falls Browns 1940; Beaver Falls Bees 1941
- Butler, PA: Butler Indians 1935; Butler Yankees 1936–1942
- Charleroi, PA: Charleroi Tigers 1934–1936
- Greensburg, PA: Greensburg Trojans 1934; Greensburg Red Wings 1935–1936; Greensburg Green Sox 1937–1938; Greensburg Senators 1939
- Jeannette, PA: Jeannette Reds 1934; Jeannette Little Pirates 1936; Jeannette Bisons 1937
- Johnstown, PA: Johnstown Johnnies 1939–1942
- McKeesport, PA: McKeesport Tubers 1934; McKeesport Braves 1935; McKeesport Tubers 1936–1938; McKeesport Little Pirates 1939; McKeesport Little Braves 1940
- Monessen, PA: Monessen Indians 1934; Monessen Reds 1935; Monessen Indians 1936; Monessen Cardinals 1937
- Oil City, PA: Oil City Oilers 1940–1942
- Warren, PA: Warren Redskins 1940; Warren Buckeyes 1941
- Washington, PA: Washington Generals 1934–1935; Washington Red Birds 1939–1942

== League champions ==
- 1934 - Greensburg Trojans
- 1935 - Monessen Reds
- 1936 - Jeannette Little Pirates
- 1937 - Butler Yankees
- 1938 - Butler Yankees - 2
- 1939 - Washington Red Birds
- 1940 - Butler Yankees - 3
- 1941 - Butler Yankees - 4
- 1942 - Butler Yankees - 5
