= Wilbur Good =

American baseball player (1885–1963)

Wilbur Goode
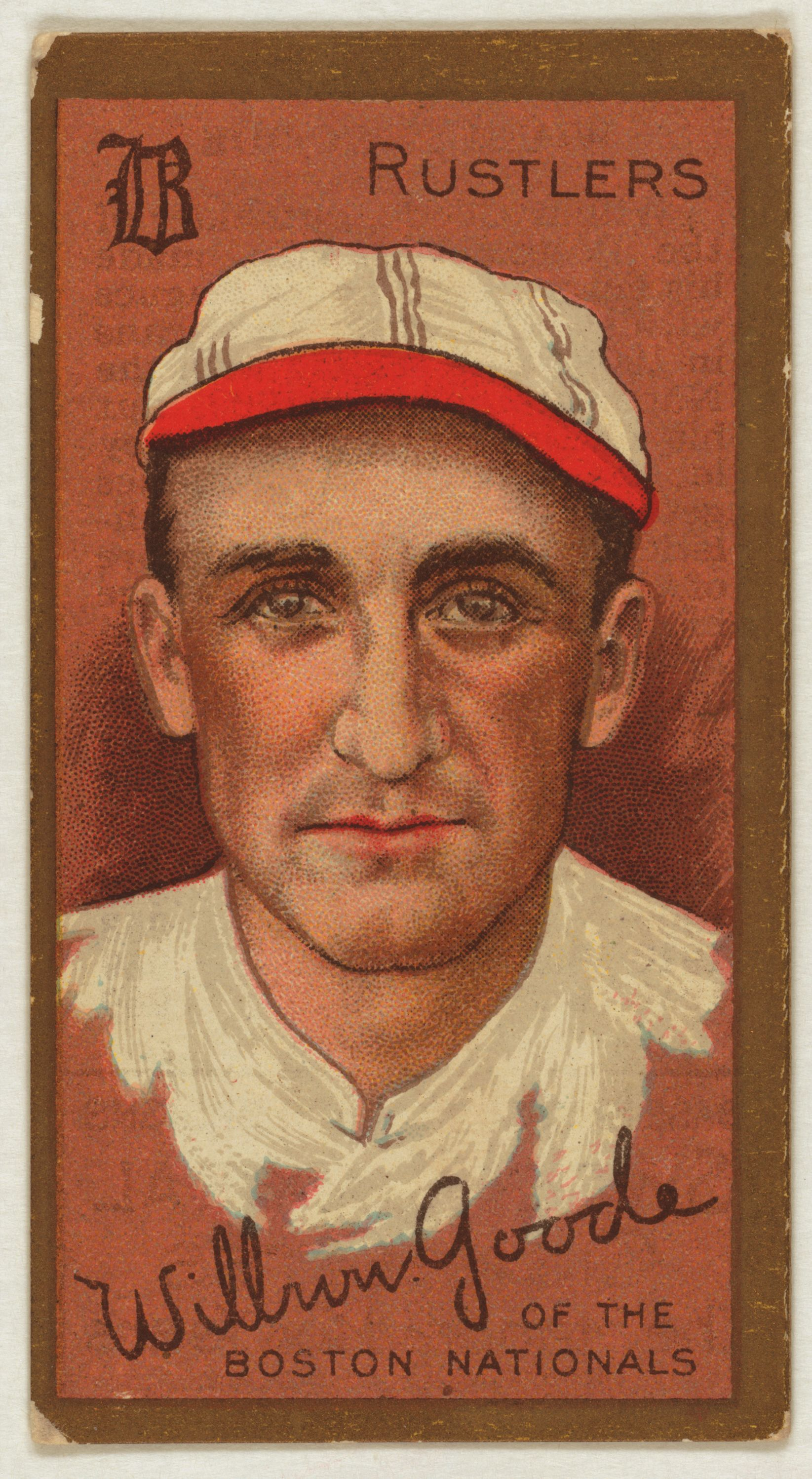
- Wilbur Good baseball card
- Outfielder
- Born: September 28, 1885; Punxsutawney, Pennsylvania, U.S.
- Died: December 30, 1963 (aged 78); Brooksville, Florida, U.S.
- Batted: Left Threw: Right

MLB debut
- August 18, 1905, for the New York Highlanders

Last MLB appearance
- September 2, 1918, for the Chicago White Sox

MLB statistics
- Batting average: .258
- Home runs: 9
- Runs batted in: 187
- Stats at Baseball Reference

Teams
- New York Highlanders (1905); Cleveland Naps (1908–1909); Boston Doves/Rustlers (1910–1911); Chicago Cubs (1911–1915); Philadelphia Phillies (1916); Chicago White Sox (1918)

Wilbur David "Lefty" Goode (September 28, 1885 – December 30, 1963) was an American outfielder for the New York Highlanders (1905), Cleveland Naps (1908–1909), Boston Doves/Rustlers (1910–1911), Chicago Cubs (1911–1915), Philadelphia Phillies (1916) and Chicago White Sox (1918).

In 11 seasons he played in 749 games and had 2,364 at-bats, 324 runs, 609 hits, 84 doubles, 44 triples, 9 home runs, 187 RBI, 104 stolen bases, 190 walks, a .258 batting average, a .322 on-base percentage, a .342 slugging percentage, 808 total bases and 60 sacrifice hits.

He died in Brooksville, Florida at the age of 78 after a long illness.
