= Marion Moguls =

US baseball team

The Marion Moguls were a professional baseball team that played in the Interstate Association and Ohio–Pennsylvania League in 1906, and according to Baseball Reference, 1907. The team was based in the United States city of Marion, Ohio and was managed by Clarence Jessup and Ferdinand Drumm.

On July 20, 1907, Webb Park in Marion hosted a 20-inning game between the Mansfield Pioneers and the Moguls. Mansfield defeated Marion in the game, by the score of 2–1. The game was played in 2 hours 11 minutes.

Numerous major league players spent time with the team, including Donie Bush, Lew Groh, Scotty Ingerton, Dutch Rudolph, Joe Stewart, Sandy Burk, Jake Daubert, Delos Drake, Charlie Luskey and Hughie Tate.
