= Akron Acorns =

- 1887–1889; (1887, 1889–1890); Akron, Ohio

Minor league affiliations
- Class: Independent (1887, 1889–1890)
- League: Ohio State League (1887, 1889); Tri-State League (1890)

Major league affiliations
- Team: None

Minor league titles
- League titles (1): 1889

Team data
- Name: Akron Acorns (1887, 1889); Akron Akrons (1890)
- Ballpark: League Park (1887, 1889–1890)

The Akron Acorns were the first minor league baseball team based in Akron, Ohio. In the 1887 and 1889 seasons, the Acorns played a member of the Independent level Ohio State League and captured the 1889 league championship in a short season of play. Akron continued play in 1890 as a member of the Tri-State League.

The Akron teams hosted home minor league games at League Park in Akron.

== History ==
Akron began hosting an independent baseball team in 1879, with the team playing against teams from communities in the region. This early Akron team played through 1881, with Charlie Morton as manager for two of the seasons. Morton would later manage the 1887 Akron Acorns. Baseball Hall of Fame member Bid McPhee played for the 1881 Akron team. Leech Maskrey, John Mansell, Tony Mullane and Jim Green also played for the early Akron team.

The Akron "Acorns" were the first minor league baseball team in Akron, Ohio. In 1887, Akron became charter members of the Independent level Ohio State League.

The Columbus Buckeyes, Kalamazoo Kazoos, Mansfield, Sandusky Suds, Steubenville Stubs, Wheeling Nail Cities and Zanesville Kickapoos teams joined Akron in beginning league play on May 2, 1887. Akron would fold before the league completed its schedule on September 28, 1887.

On September 3, 1887, after compiling a final record of 32–60, the Akron Acorns folded. Akron was managed by A.B. Showers, Charlie Morton, Sandy McDermott and Bill Irwin during their partial season. Kalamazoo was the eventual league champion. Player/manager Bill Irwin led the Ohio State with 283 strikeouts pitching for the Acorns and the Kalamazoo Kazoos.

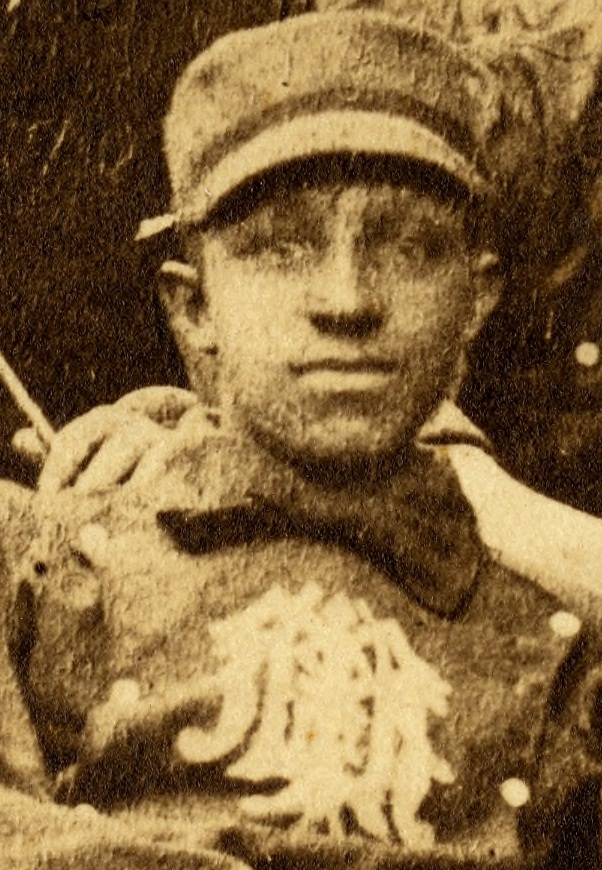
(1883) Weldy Walker cropped from 1883 Michigan team portrait

Weldy Walker was the shortstop, while playing for Akron in 1887, integrating the roster. Walker moved to the Pittsburgh Keystones after four games with Akron due to racial segregation talking hold in professional baseball by official policy. Walker made his major league debut with the Toledo Blue Stockings in 1884, becoming the second black player to play in a major league contest. His older brother Moses Fleetwood Walker had played for Toledo earlier in the 1884 season. Walker and his brother had attended Oberlin College and the University of Michigan, playing for the baseball teams at both schools.

The Ohio State League does not have records of play in 1888. In 1889, the league reformed as a four-team league, with Akron rejoining the league.

The Ohio State League began play late in the 1889 season and ending the season with Akron in first place. The 1889 Akron team was also referred to as the "Akrons." Akron joined the Tiffin, Newark and Youngstown teams in beginning Ohio State League play on August 30, 1889.

After beginning the league schedule in late August, with a final regular season record of 17–9, Akron was in first place when the Ohio State season ended on September 29, 1889. The team was managed by Harry Roberts and Charles Pike. Akron was 4.5 games ahead of second place Youngstown in the final standings, followed by Newark and Tiffin.

In the 1890 season, the Akron "Akrons" continued minor league play in a new league. Akron played the season as members of the eight-team Tri-State League. The Akrons ended their 1890 season with a record of 38–38 and in fourth place in the league standings, which were won by the Dayton Reds. The Tri-State League did not return to play in 1891.

Today, Akron continues minor league baseball play, serving as home to the Akron RubberDucks of the Class AA level Eastern League, after the franchise began play in the league in 1989.

== The ballpark ==
The Akron Acorns teams hosted home minor league games at League Park. The ballpark hosted Akron minor league teams through 1920. Uniquely, the left field wall was tilted at an angle with wooden supports holding it up and the slope ranging from 35 to 60 degrees. Outfielders could run up the wooden fence to catch balls in play. By rule, if a batted ball rolled over the fence, it was a ground-rule double. The ballpark was located at Beaver Street & Carroll Street in Akron. League Park was torn down, and the Summit Growers Market Company was constructed on the site. Today, the site remains commercial as the Summitt Trading Company occupies the site. Summitt Trading company is located at 155 Beaver Street in Akron.

== Timeline ==
Year(s)	# Yrs.	Team	Level	League	Ballpark
1887	1	Akron Acorns	Independent	Ohio State League	League Park
1889	1	Akron Acorns	Independent	Ohio State League	League Park
1890	1	Akron Akrons	Independent	Tri-State League	League Park

== Year–by–year records ==
Year	Record	Finish	Manager	Playoffs
1887	32–60	NA	A.B. Showers / Charlie Morton / Sandy McDermott / Bill Irwin	Team folded September 3
1889	17–9	1st	Harry Roberts / Charles Pike	League champions
1890	38–38	4th	Charles Pike	No playoffs held

== Notable alumni ==
- Roger Carey (1890)
- Theodore Conover (1890)
- John Fitzgerald (1887)
- Belden Hill (1887)
- Bill Irwin (1887, MGR)
- Sandy McDermott (1887, MGR)
- Charlie Morton ((1887, MGR)
- Frank Motz (1887, 1890)
- Pussy Tebeau (1890)
- Weldy Walker (1887)

== See also ==
- Akron Acorns players
- Akron Akrons players
