= Zanesville Moguls =

The Zanesville Moguls were an Ohio–Pennsylvania League minor league baseball team that played in 1906 and 1907. The team moved to Marion, Ohio in August 1906. It was managed by Ferdinand Drumm.

Notable players include Bert Blue, Donie Bush, Lew Groh, Scotty Ingerton, Jul Kustus, Dutch Rudolph and Tom Thomas.
