= Herm Malloy =

American baseball player (1885–1942)

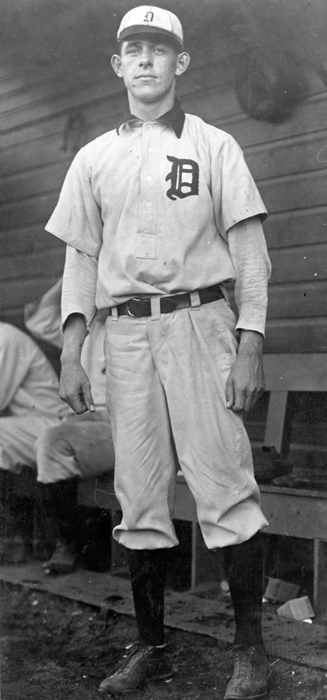
- Herman Malloy, Detroit Tigers pitcher
- Pitcher
- Born: June 1, 1885; Massillon, Ohio, U.S.
- Died: May 9, 1942 (aged 56); Louisville, Ohio, U.S.
- Batted: Right Threw: Right

MLB debut
- October 6, 1907, for the Detroit Tigers

Last MLB appearance
- June 1, 1908, for the Detroit Tigers

MLB statistics
- Win–loss record: 0–3
- Earned run average: 4.32
- Strikeouts: 14
- Stats at Baseball Reference

Teams
- Detroit Tigers (1907–1908)

John Herman Malloy (June 1, 1885 – May 9, 1942), nicknamed "Tug," was an American baseball pitcher. He played professional baseball for eight years from 1905 to 1912, including two years in Major League Baseball for the Detroit Tigers in their American League pennant winning years of 1907 and 1908. In four major league games, he compiled an 0-3 record and a 4.32 earned run average (ERA).

== Early years ==
Malloy was born in 1885 in Massillon, Ohio.

== Professional baseball player ==
Malloy began his professional baseball career in 1905 with the Massillon Farmers and Mount Vernon Clippers of the Ohio-Pennsylvania League. He advanced in 1906 to play for the Evansville River Rats of the Central League. He appeared in 30 games, pitched 224 innings, and compiled an 11-15 record.

He began the 1907 season with the Dayton Veterans of the Central League. He appeared in 35 games for Dayton, pitched 166 innings, and compiled an 18-15 record.

Late in the season, he was acquired by the Detroit Tigers and made his major league debut on October 6, 1907. He pitched a complete game against St. Louis, allowing 10 runs (five earned) and striking out six batters. With that as his only appearance in 1907, he compiled a 0-1 record and a 5.63 ERA.

Malloy returned to the Tigers in 1908, appearing in three games and compiling an 0-2 record with a 3.71 ERA. He appeared in his last major league game on June 1, 1908.

Malloy returned to the minor leagues, playing for the Fort Wayne Billikens (1908), Evansville River Rats (1908), Wilkes-Barre Barons (1909), Baltimore Orioles (1910), Scranton Miners (1911), and Utica Utes (1911-1912).

== Later years ==
Malloy was a resident of Massillon, Ohio, throughout his life. He was repeatedly arrested in the 1930s on alcohol-related charges, and was referred to as a "drunk" in accounts published in the Massillon newspaper:

- In March 1931, he was arrested and charged with illegal possession of whisky.
- In March 1932, he was arrested and charged with being a bootlegger. Police discovered a pint of illicit whisky and a number of empty bottles in his room.
- He was arrested by police in February 1933 when discovered unconscious in the street; he was found to have sustained a broken hip.
- In June 1934, he was arrested by police after being found loitering in the streets at a late hour.
- In December 1934, he was arrested for public intoxication.
- In August 1935, he was discovered in an alley with his head and clothing covered with blood. He was a resident at the time of a city lodging house.
- In July 1938, he was referred to as "drunk" in an article noting that he had been fined $15 for intoxication.

In May 1942, Malloy died at age 56 after several years' illness at the Molly Stark Sanitarium in Louisville, Ohio. He was buried at St. Joseph's Cemetery in Massillon.
