= Sharon Giants =

- 1905–1911; (1905–1908, 1911–1912); Sharon, Pennsylvania

Minor league affiliations
- Previous classes: Class D (1912); Class C (1905–1911)
- League: Ohio–Pennsylvania League

Team data
- Previous names: Bridgeport Giants (August 10, 1912–1912); Sharon Giants (1912- August 10, 1912); Sharon Travelers (1911); Sharon Giants (1907–1908); Sharon Steels (1905–1906)

The Sharon Giants was the predominant name of a minor league baseball team based in Sharon, Pennsylvania that existed between 1905 and 1912. The team played all of its seasons in the Ohio–Pennsylvania League.

The team was first established in 1905 as the Sharon Steels and managed by Frank Killen, a former pitcher for the Pittsburgh Pirates and Washington Senators. By 1907 the team was renamed the Sharon Giants for the 1907 and 1908 seasons, before folding.

On August 12, 1911, the New Castle Nocks, of the Ohio–Pennsylvania League, moved to Sharon where they were renamed the Sharon Travelers. The club finished last at 35-101-1. In 1912 they were renamed the Sharon Giants. However the team soon moved to Bridgeport, Ohio on August 10, 1912 and were renamed the Bridgeport Giants. The team then folded at the end of the season.
