= Zanesville Infants =

The Zanesville Infants (1908–1909) was a short-lived baseball franchise located in Zanesville, Ohio, and affiliated with the regional Central League. The organization's name was intended to highlight that they were a new minor league club. The Infants proved tough competitors and were runners-up in the league championship in 1909.

A ball club featuring many players who later formed the core of the Infants was established in Zanesville in 1907, when local investors purchased the Youngstown Ohio Works. The investors also offered a contract to the Youngstown, Ohio, club's ex-manager, Marty Hogan, a former major league outfielder. Although the Zanesville team failed in its bid to join the Ohio–Pennsylvania League, it secured a spot in the less prestigious Pennsylvania–Ohio–Maryland League. The Zanesville team disbanded along with the P-O-M League at the close of the 1907 season.

Hogan managed the Infants in the 1908 season but moved on to Lancaster, Pennsylvania, the following year, leading that team to its first championship in the Tri-State League. Meanwhile, the Zanesville team competed fiercely with the Wheeling Stogies, who took the Central League Championship with an 88-50 record. The Infants were runners-up in the contest, closing the season with a 75-58 record. In July 1909, the Zanesville Infants earned a spot in baseball history when the team participated in the first electrified night game in Grand Rapids, Michigan. The event was made possible by inventor George Cahill, who provided his new portable lighting.
