= Youngstown Indians =

American baseball club during only 1909

The Youngstown Indians were a Minor League Baseball club that competed during the 1909 season in the Ohio–Pennsylvania League. The team showed great promise at the outset of the season but finished with a disappointing 46–78 record, placing last in the league. The league championship that year went to an Akron franchise, which closed the season with an 81–40 record.

== Origins ==
The short-lived Youngstown Indians team succeeded other minor league clubs in Youngstown, Ohio, including the championship Youngstown Ohio Works and Youngstown Champs. The 1907 sale of the Ohio Works team to investors in Zanesville, Ohio, paved the way for the establishment of the Champs. Like the Ohio Works club, which won two consecutive league championships, the Champs were sponsored by local industrial leader Joseph A. McDonald and his brother, Thomas. The Champs won the 1907 championship of the Ohio–Pennsylvania League, but the following year, their season was cut short when the owners of the Youngstown franchise "threw up the sponge in mid-season". In 1909, the newly established Youngstown Indians secured the backing of a stock company in New Castle, Pennsylvania, and were managed by W.R. Terry.

== Controversy ==
The challenges facing the Youngstown Indians reflected perennial difficulties within the Ohio–Pennsylvania League, including weak financial support for teams and uneven ticket sales. The Spalding Guide's Youngstown-based correspondent, W. A. Mason, noted that support for the league in that city had eroded because of the local club's poor performance. "Youngstown had the tailend team and the fans had been used to winning ball", Mason wrote. He added, however, that the league, "taking together the gate receipts and the moneys received from the sale and drafting of players", proved to be a "moneymaker" for the first time since its establishment.

Despite its improved financial situation, the Ohio–Pennsylvania League narrowly escaped the prospect of dissolution late in the 1909 season. As the Spalding Guide reports, the league's unraveling was prevented only by the guidance of the league president, Sam L. Wright, who had earlier managed the Youngstown Champs. Toward the end of the season, Wright took the extraordinary step of backing the Youngstown Indians, when their New Castle owners "gave it up". This move preserved the eight-team league, which also included teams from Akron, East Liverpool, McKeesport, New Castle, Canton, and Steubenville.

== Dissolution ==
At the close of the 1909 season, the club came under the co-ownership of former Indians manager Terry and business partner Paul Powers. Renamed as the Youngstown Steelmen, the team competed in the Ohio–Pennsylvania League during the 1910 and 1911 seasons. The Steelmen joined the Central League in 1912, and that year, narrowly lost the pennant to a rival franchise from Fort Wayne, Indiana, placing second in the league.
