= New Castle Outlaws =

The New Castle Outlaws were an Ohio–Pennsylvania League minor league baseball team that played in 1906. The club featured numerous major league players: Dick Carroll, Jim Clark, Herbert Jackson, Bob Lindemann, Red Long and Dutch Rudolph. The team went 73–67 in its lone year of existence. It was based in New Castle, Pennsylvania. The team was called "Stetler's Outlaws", after manager Percy Stetler.
