= Youngstown Champs =

Minor league baseball team

The Youngstown Champs were a minor league baseball team that competed in the Ohio–Pennsylvania League in 1907 and 1908. The club won the league championship in 1907 but disbanded in the middle of the 1908 season.

== Origins ==
The Champs were among several minor league ball clubs that operated in Youngstown, Ohio, in the early 20th century. The team was preceded by the Youngstown Ohio Works, which won two consecutive league championships in 1905 and 1906.

In 1907, the Ohio Works' sponsors, local industrialists Joseph and Thomas McDonald, approved the sale of the franchise to Zanesville investors. As the Marion Daily Mirror observed in March 1907, this move raised questions about the future of the Ohio–Pennsylvania League. "For a time the threatened withdrawal of Youngstown portended the break up of the league", the paper stated. "Sharon and New Castle felt they could not support clubs without the rivalry that existed between the three towns". The article added that three candidates were initially considered for the position of club manager: Mert Whitney, a player with a Buffalo, New York, franchise who previously played first base for the Youngstown club; Harry Ostdiek, a recently signed catcher from Canton, Ohio; and Sam L. Wright, the city editor of The Youngstown Daily Vindicator. According to the article, however, the withdrawal of the Youngstown club's previous manager had dampened efforts to secure funding for a new franchise. "The fact that Marty Hogan will in no way be connected with the Youngstown team has made the work much harder than ordinary for the promoters", the paper stated. Ultimately, a new club was organized, with Wright as manager. That year, the Youngstown Baseball Company took an office on the mezzanine floor of the Dollar Bank Building in downtown Youngstown.

Wright, who was former sports editor of the Vindicator, went on to serve as president of the Ohio–Pennsylvania League in 1909.

== Championship and dissolution ==
The Youngstown club won the 1907 championship in a close race with a Newark, Ohio, franchise. The Champs closed the season with an 86–53 record, while the Newark Newks worked up an 86–52 record, placing second in the league. The Champs met with less success the following season.

On June 9, 1908, the Vindicator reported the Champs' claim that two losses suffered at East Liverpool, Ohio, and McKeesport, Pennsylvania, resulted from "putrid" drinking water at East Liverpool that made the players sick. The Champs' situation failed to improve, and in the middle of the 1908 season, the club's owners withdrew their sponsorship.

The team was later replaced by the Youngstown Indians, which competed in the Ohio–Pennsylvania League in 1909, under the sponsorship of a New Castle, Pennsylvania, stock company.
