= Marty Hogan =

English baseball player (1869–1923)

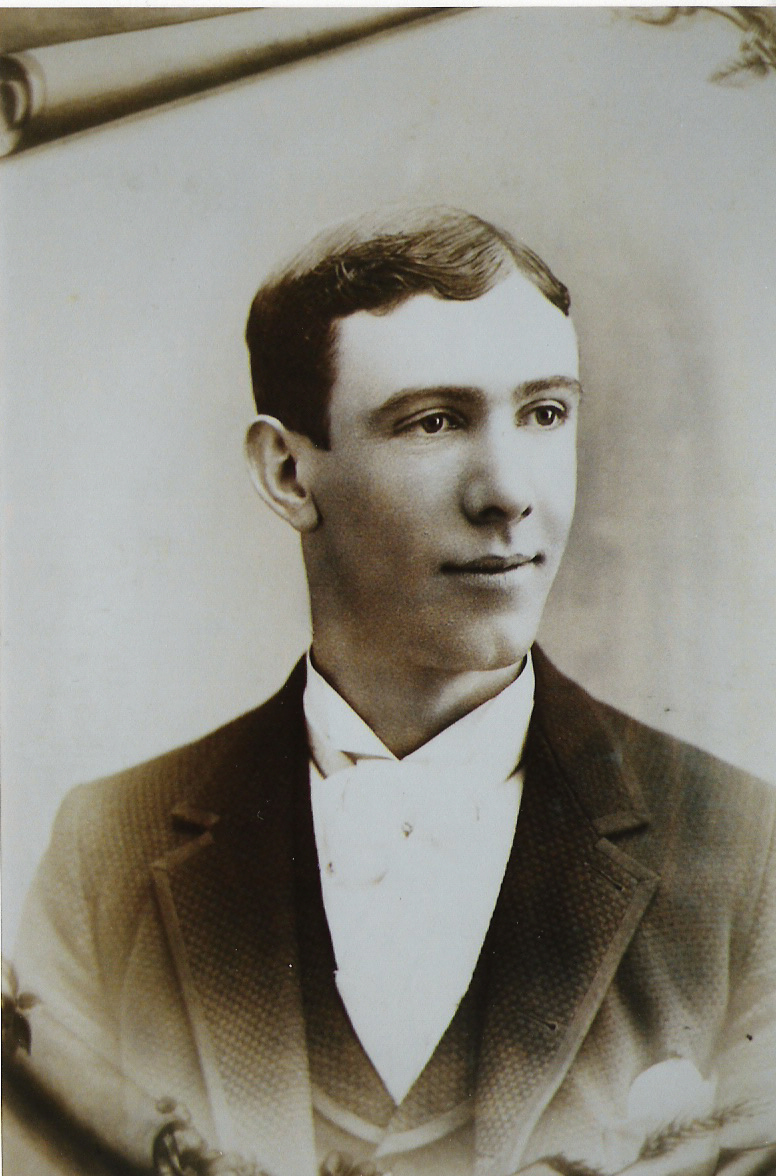
- Outfielder
- Born: October 25, 1869; Wednesbury, England
- Died: August 15, 1923 (aged 53); Youngstown, Ohio, U.S.
- Batted: Right Threw: Right

MLB debut
- August 6, 1894, for the Cincinnati Reds

Last MLB appearance
- April 24, 1895, for the St. Louis Browns

MLB statistics
- Batting average: .241
- Home runs: 0
- Runs batted in: 18
- Stats at Baseball Reference

Teams
- Cincinnati Reds (1894); St. Louis Browns (1894–95)

Martin Francis Hogan (October 25, 1869 – August 15, 1923), nicknamed "the Indianapolis Ringer", was an English-born right fielder in Major League Baseball (MLB) who played for the Cincinnati Reds (1894) and St. Louis Browns (1894–1895). After leaving the National League, Hogan moved on to the minor league Indianapolis Hoosiers. Some sources suggest he set a national baserunning record in the 1890s.

When his playing career ended, he worked as a minor league baseball manager in Ohio, Pennsylvania, and Wisconsin. As a manager, Hogan groomed several pitchers who excelled in the major leagues. He signed future stars Stan Coveleski and Sam Jones to their first professional contracts and helped launch the career of Roy Castleton, the first native of Utah to play in the major leagues.

In 1912, Hogan was among a select group of veteran managers invited to participate in the United States Baseball League, which was treated by the baseball establishment as an "outlaw league". For reasons that are unclear, he did not actually manage a franchise in the short-lived alternative league and resumed his career as a minor league manager. Hogan eventually settled in his adopted hometown of Youngstown, Ohio, where he died in 1923.

== Early years ==
Hogan was born to Patrick J. Hogan, Sr., and his wife, the former Margaret Gillen, in the industrial town of Wednesbury, Staffordshire (now West Midlands, England.) When he was still a child, his parents, both natives of Ireland, relocated the family from England to Youngstown, Ohio, a steel-production center near the Pennsylvania border. Although Hogan is routinely identified as Anglo-American (given his English birth), baseball historians Joel Zoss and John Bowman wrote that he probably regarded himself as an Irish American.

The Hogan family settled on Youngstown's near west side, in a working-class district known as Westlake's Crossing. In Youngstown, Hogan's father, Patrick J. Hogan, Sr., secured employment as a steelworker, while his older brother, Patrick J. Hogan, Jr., worked his way up to the position of "roller" at the Union Steel Company (later consolidated with U.S. Steel). Martin Hogan moved in the direction of an athletic career, gaining early recognition as a "foot racer". His interest in sports was evidently encouraged by his father, who closely followed his son's baseball career even in later life. Patrick J. Hogan, Sr.'s obituary described him as "a great baseball fan", who "was as quick to appreciate a clever 'steal' or a 'heady' play as any one of the younger generation".

While little is known about Martin Hogan's early years in Youngstown, there is evidence he was popular among local residents. His obituary referred to him as an individual "of pleasing personality" who "made many friends during his long residence in Youngstown". Another newspaper article described him as "a good fellow", and a third indicated he was well liked among players with whom he worked. At the same time, Hogan was reportedly quick to comment when he felt he was treated unfairly.

== Playing career ==
The 1894 St. Louis Browns (Hogan in second row, second from left).

Before joining the major leagues, Hogan played for minor league baseball teams in the northeastern United States, including the Akron (Ohio) Summits and Scranton (Pennsylvania) Miners. He began his career as a major league player with the Cincinnati Reds, on August 4, 1894, but played only six games before switching to the St. Louis Browns (later known as the Cardinals). By this time, St. Louis had been eliminated from league championship contention, after being tied with Cleveland and Boston for first place in April. Hogan participated in 29 games with St. Louis in the 1894 season. According to the 1895 edition of Spalding's Official Baseball Guide, he ranked tenth among league outfielders with a percentage of .941 for put-outs, assists, and errors. Among his teammates, Hogan held the second highest percentage of stolen bases for games played. In March 1895, a reporter for Sporting Life praised the Browns' decision to retain Hogan in center field and emphasized the young outfielder's potential. "On the bases and in the field the lad is a wonder", the paper stated. "His only fault is weakness at the bat, but increasing confidence and familiarity with [National] League players will undoubtedly improve him in this respect". Despite Hogan's physical speed, however, his overall performance with the Browns proved uneven, and his two-season batting average was just .241. On May 17, 1895, the Youngstown Daily Vindicator reported that Hogan had been "farmed out" as a center fielder to the Indianapolis Hoosiers, a club connected to the well-organized Western League, the predecessor of the American League. The Vindicator added, "At any time by giving a proper notification the St. Louis team, of which club Hogan is a member, can again secure his services". Yet, for reasons that are unclear, Hogan never returned to the St. Louis Browns. He played his last game with the team on April 24, 1895, concluding a major-league career that comprised 40 games over two seasons.

At Indianapolis, Hogan led at the bat, and contemporary sources indicate his performance improved. "Marty Hogan, who is playing temporarily in middle field for the Indianapolis team of the western league...is covering himself in glory with his superb playing", the Vindicator reported on June 4, 1895. "The Indianapolis Sentinel of May 31st says: Hogan made a great record at the bat yesterday morning", the newspaper added. "One of the drives was for a home run and three of the hits were bunts". In addition, the article credited Hogan with four runs, five base hits, and two put outs in a late morning game against a rival team from St. Paul, Minnesota. The Vindicator went on to quote the Indianapolis Journal as follows: "Among the features of the forenoon game was Hogan's batting. He got five hits, one a home run, and his bunting was even cleverer than usual, and that is saying a great deal". The article concluded, "If he keeps up this gait, it will not be long before [St. Louis Browns owner Chris] Von der Ahe reclaims his pet".

Hogan's obituary stated that, at some point in his playing career, he set a record for baserunning. Several sources trace this record to a field day event held in Indianapolis in 1895, when he reportedly rounded the bases in 13.2 seconds. The World Almanac and Encyclopedia 1906, for instance, reported that Hogan "lowered the base-running record" in 1895, noting that "[t]he distance around the bases is 120 yards". In January 1906, Sporting Life reported that Hogan had "taken steps to have the base running record awarded to him". The report added, "Under proper conditions [Hogan] turned the route in 13 1–5 seconds at Indianapolis in 1895". Some observers questioned the veracity of the record, however. In 1907, for instance, Washington Post sports columnist J. Ed Grillo conceded that "Hogan was a great sprinter" but described his unofficial record as "out of reason". Grillo, who argued that "the fastest runners in baseball failed to come anywhere near the mark", lent his support to an official record of 14.1 that had been set more recently by Eastern League player Wally Clement. An article published in the Washington Herald days earlier also raised questions about Hogan's baserunning record. In this case, however, the writer claimed that the most "authentic" record had been set by Harry Berthrong in the 1860s. The article stated that, while Hogan was "said to have beaten Berthrong's base-circling record of 13 2–5 seconds by a fifth of a second", this alleged feat was not "performed under official sanction". One year earlier, in 1906, Berthrong, himself, weighed in on the debate. According to an article that appeared in Sporting Life in March of that year, Berthrong disputed Hogan's claim. "My time...around the bases was made in Washington, D.C., in July 1868, after the old Nationals of Washington, D.C., had played a game with the Pastimes of Baltimore, Md.", Berthrong was quoted as saying in an interview. "Three stop watches were held over me, the slowest giving me 14 1/4". The retired player added: "I am skeptical about this man Hogan doing the bases in 13 1-5: nobody but an Arthur Duffey could possibly do it, and I doubt if he could". For reasons that are unclear, the article indicated that Hogan claimed to round the bases in 1889, six earlier than other reports. (A similar description of Hogan's claim appeared elsewhere in the same edition of Sporting Life; a brief news item suggested he claimed to set the record "in Indianapolis in the 80's".) Baseball historian Jon Daly traced Hogan's contested record to 1898; he speculated that Ben Morgan, an official of the National Association, "disputed that claim when doing a study of field day records". The most widely accepted national baserunning record was set by Evar Swanson, who rounded the bases in 13.4 seconds in 1929. Despite questions surrounding Hogan's baserunning record, he became popularly known as the "Indianapolis Ringer". Newspaper reports suggest he defended his position as baserunning champion of the Western League in various pre-game competitions. On August 2, 1895, the Vindicator noted that the outfielder had "a rival for the base running honors in the western league in George Nichol of the Milwaukees who, it is claimed, can get down to first quicker than Hogan". The article added, "A race between the two is talked of". Then, on August 17, 1895, the Vindicator reported that Hogan had defeated Detroit outfielder Frank Tower in a baserunning contest. "The Hoosiers have in Mart Hogan a pretty good extra card", the article added. "Indianapolis goes around the land, and their sprinting outfielder meets all comers in foot races before the game. He has not yet been defeated". Several days earlier, the same newspaper quoted a journalist from Sporting Life, who reportedly commented: "Mart Hogan, the Indianapolis outfielder, is showing such astonishing speed that he will probably be taken to England next year for the Sheffield Handicap".

In February 1896, Hogan received an offer to manage the Youngstown (Ohio) Puddlers, a minor league team associated with the Interstate League. The Vindicator reported that the outfielder refused the offer. "Hogan expects to play again with the St. Louis team in the National League", the Vindicator stated. The paper went on to quote an article that supposedly appeared in the Cincinnati-based Commercial Gazette: "St. Louis fans are opposed to the idea of selling Marty Hogan, the fast out-fielder, who played with the Indianapolis team last season, having been loaned by the Browns". In the spring of 1896, however, Hogan attempted to extricate himself from remaining contractual obligations to the St. Louis Browns. Sporting Life reported, in May 1896, that Hogan was unsuccessful in his efforts to obtain a final release from the Browns, who retained him as an "extra" right fielder. "Marty has not been given any kind of trial by the manager of the Browns, although he stood high in batting and base running in the Western League last year", the article stated. "He is in fine condition, and is anxious to play, but does not prepare to be shifted about at the will of alleged managers". The paper added that Hogan had returned to St. Louis in March 1896, prepared to "purchase" his release, "but he has been held onto until now, when he could have secured $1550 for his services in the Western League". Hogan appeared especially confident of his baserunning abilities. The article noted that the outfielder had "offered to match himself to run 100 yards for $500 a side against any player in the National League". Meanwhile, his batting evidently continued to improve. On May 24, 1896, an article in the St. Paul (Minnesota) Globe indicated Hogan performed exceptionally well at the bat during a contest between the Hoosiers and the St. Paul Saints. "Marty Hogan...through an inadvertent mix-up of pugilism and baseball...tried to hammer the face off the ball, which had tantalized the other Hoosiers", the article stated, "and when Marty's work was done, the ball was out of the lot and he was on second base".

At some point in the 1896 season, Hogan apparently secured his release from the Browns. Once again, however, his physical speed offered no guarantee of consistency on the playing field. On July 21, 1896, the St. Paul (Minneapolis) Globe reported that Hogan had performed poorly in a contest between the Hoosiers and the local ball club. "Marty Hogan...made a bad fumble, and then looked up at the sky to see if it had moved while he was locating the ball", the paper reported. "It was a good bluff, but the crowd discovered Marty's weakness before the end of the game". In January 1897, the Vindicator reported that the Hoosiers had sold Hogan to a club in Grand Rapids, Michigan. The article called Hogan "one of the fastest outfielders and baserunners in the Western League" and predicted he would "greatly strengthen the Grand Rapids outfield". The following month, however, the paper described the previous report as a "mistake", indicating instead that Hogan had signed a contract with baseball executive John T. Brush to play with the Hoosiers for another year. The paper also reported that the contract granted Hogan "the largest salary he has ever drawn". Despite this lucrative contract, Hogan established and maintained his own advertising distribution agency in Indianapolis. "He goes about the streets dressed much like an English costermonger", Sporting Life reported in January 1897. "Marty can be seen with a little red wagon full of signs and advertising matter chasing up and down streets nailing the signs to buildings and convenient places and distributing advertising literature in the reel-dance portion of Indianapolis". Less than four months later, in May 1897, he was released by the Indianapolis ball club. In June 1897, the Kansas City Journal indicated Hogan had moved on to the Dayton (Ohio) Old Soldiers, a team affiliated with the Class B Interstate League, where he was "playing a sensational center field". In October of the same year, Sporting Life speculated Hogan would remain with Dayton during the upcoming 1898 season. "Marty Hogan's contract with Dayton is such that he cannot be reserved, as are the rest of the players", the article stated. "Unless Marty has a better offer to play with some other team it is safe to say that he will be with Dayton next year". Further research is required to determine how long Hogan continued to play as an outfielder in the minor leagues. (His obituary indicated that he also worked as a major league trainer.) During his playing career, he apparently received at least one serious injury. In February 1903, Sporting Life reported that the former baseball player's friends were "anxious to get him appointed on the staff of American League umpires". The article added, "Hogan has suffered from operations to remove portions of his breast bone, which was injured in a collision during a baseball game".

== Managing career ==
=== Youngstown Ohio Works ===
After retiring as a baseball player, Hogan settled in Youngstown and went into business. At some point, Sam Wright, then sports editor of The Youngstown Daily Vindicator, encouraged him to manage the city's baseball team. In 1902, Hogan was hired as manager of the Youngstown Ohio Works, an independent ball club sponsored by Joseph A. McDonald, superintendent of the Ohio Works of the Carnegie Steel Company. The club did not immediately become associated with an independent league, however. On April 5, 1902, Sporting Life noted that Hogan represented the Youngstown club at a poorly attended meeting of the Western Association, a short-lived independent league based in Cleveland. "Marty Hogan arrived at noon and wanted a franchise for Youngstown", the paper reported, "but Zanesville, Springfield and South Bend, who had asked to be admitted to membership, had no representatives present". Then, in January 1904, Sporting Life reported that Hogan had "declined the proposition to put a Central League into Youngstown". In May 1905, however, the Youngstown club was one of eleven teams to join the Protective Association of Independent Clubs, which formed the basis of the Class C Division Ohio–Pennsylvania League. Ultimately, the league trimmed down to eight teams from the following cities: Akron, Ohio; Homestead, Pennsylvania; Lancaster, Pennsylvania; Newark, Ohio; Niles, Ohio; Sharon, Pennsylvania; Youngstown, and Zanesville, Ohio. That September, the Youngstown Ohio Works won the league championship, although sources disagree on the team's final record. As baseball researcher John Zajc writes: "The Reach Guide (1906) credits Youngstown with an 84–32 won-lost record where the Spalding Guide of the same year lists a 90–35 record. The Encyclopedia of Minor League Baseball (1993) tells a third story, giving Youngstown an 88–35 mark".

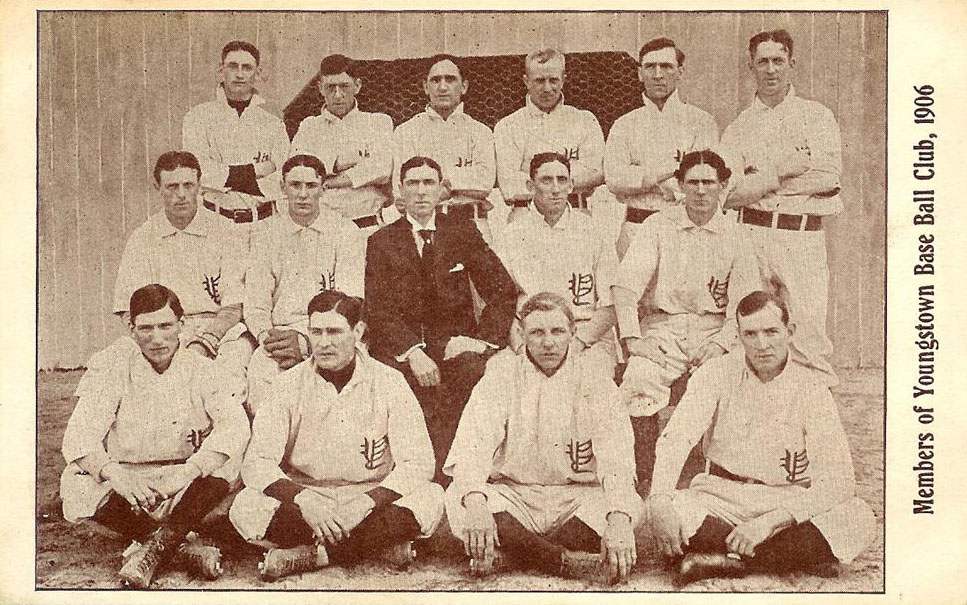
Youngstown Ohio Works (1906), with Castleton in second row, second from left

On the heels of this achievement, Hogan reportedly "lost his entire infield", when several players moved on to more established minor league and major league teams. "[Billy] Phyle will go to the [outlaw leagues], Starr will be traded by [American League manager James] McAleer, Whitney goes to Buffalo and Burton will likely return to Central League ball", Sporting Life reported. The manager had no difficulty compensating for these losses, however. The sports paper reported, in October 1905, that future major-leaguer Louis "Lew" Schettler, "the star twirler of the Sharon team", was anxious to join the Ohio Works team. The paper added that Schettler "would like a year under Marty Hogan". In December 1905, the paper confirmed that Hogan had secured catcher Lee Fohl and pitcher Schettler, "the star battery of this league for last season". The paper added that the manager had "signed two young Cleveland players in outfielder Hugh Donovan and first baseman Harry [Schwartz]". In addition, Hogan attempted to sign on as pitcher Walter Purdue, "second rush of the Youngstown polo team". Meanwhile, Hogan reportedly "sold out his cafe at Youngstown" in order to "devote his entire time to base ball". According to Sporting Life, the manager even planned to challenge former major-leaguer Charlie Morton for the presidency of the Ohio-Pennsylvanie League, a bid that evidently proved unsuccessful.

In January 1906, Morton, as league president, called a meeting of the Ohio–Pennsylvania League. According to Sporting Life, representatives of the clubs were scheduled to meet at Zanesville's Hotel Rogge on January 16. "Assurances have been received that representatives from Akron, Youngstown, Zanesville, Newark, Lancaster, Mansfield, New Castle, East Liverpool, Steubenville and Erie, Pa., will be present", the paper reported, "and from there an eight or ten club circuit will probably be formed, with McKeesport, Butler and Ashtabula as applicants also". (The league eventually formed an eight-team circuit that included teams from Akron, Lancaster, Mansfield, Newark, New Castle, Sharon, Youngstown and Zanesville.) The paper also noted that William J. Maloney, the center fielder for the Ohio Works club during the previous season, would sign a contract and serve as team captain. Among others, Hogan announced the "engagement" of Utah-born pitcher Roy Castleton. The Ohio Works team opened the 1906 season with 16 players, three of whom had been part of the club during the 1905 season. According to Sporting Life, Hogan predicted the club would win the pennant at the close of the upcoming season. He expressed confidence in a lineup that included Maloney of Bradford, Kentucky; Will M. Thomas of Morristown, Pennsylvania; Tommy Thomas of Piqua, Ohio; Fohl of Allegheny, Pennsylvania; Schettler of Pittsburgh; "Dotty" Freck of Columbus, Ohio; A. C. McClintock of Columbus; Castleton of Salt Lake City; Lewis Groh of Rochester, New York; John Kennedy of Youngstown, Charles Crouse of Detroit; Roy Chase of Andover, Ohio; Forrester J. Dressner of Garrettsville, Pennsylvania; Schwartz of Cleveland; and Roy Gould of Middlesex, Pennsylvania. Indeed, in 1906, the Ohio Works team took the league championship once again, with an 84–53 record, while new player Roy Castleton gained national recognition by pitching a perfect game against a rival club in Akron. On October 1, 1906, Hogan and members of the Ohio Works team were honored at a banquet held at the Elks' Club in downtown Youngstown. Sporting Life reported that the keynote address was delivered by Father M. T. Kinkead, "who declared himself a fan of Sunday baseball playing". The article added that Hogan "was presented with a ring and each player was given a pair of gold cuff link inscribed 'O. & P. Champs 1906'". On October 6, 1906, Sporting Life summarized the league's most recent season, reporting that the Ohio Works team had "held the lead continually after the first months of the season and at one time threatened a walkover".

The following month, in November 1906, Hogan responded to rumors that Walter East, manager of the Akron Rubbernecks, had agreed to "lay down" to the Youngstown club, enabling them to win the pennant. "Instead of laying down to us, Akron loaded up with catcher [Red] Munson and pitcher Bob Spade", Hogan said in an interview with the Pittsburgh Press. "They worked their heads off to down us, but could not do so". Hogan went on to assert that the Akron club, and its manager, received generous incentives to defeat Youngstown. "The Akron owner offered the players a bonus of $500 if they would beat us out in addition to a $300 wad for East", Hogan said. Then, he accused East himself of attempting to "fix" a game during the 1906 season, claiming that the Akron manager had "tried to get another club to take things easy against Akron so that Akron could beat us for the pennant".

In the wake of the Ohio Works' second league championship, steps were taken to incorporate the club. In December 1906, Sporting Life reported that the team's backers, Joseph and Thomas McDonald, who served as superintendent and assistant superintendent, respectively, of the Ohio Works of the Carnegie Steel Company, were compelled to invite additional investors because of planned (and costly) improvements at the steel plant. "The incorporators of the club will be Thomas McDonald, Joseph McDonald, Thomas Carr, Thomas Carter and Marty Hogan", the paper stated. "Manager Hogan will be given even more control of the team next season than he has had. Heretofore he has had the entire control of the team and transacted most of the business". Sporting Life predicted that, in the wake of the team's incorporation, "everything will fall absolutely on [Hogan's] shoulders". The paper added that the Ohio Works team intended to build a new ballpark on the south side of Youngstown, near the corner of Glenwood and Parkview avenues. "One of the largest grand stands in the minor leagues will be put up and the grounds will be in every way modern", the article stated.

Differences between Hogan and the McDonald brothers, however, had already surfaced in the autumn of 1906. Although a sports writer for The Youngstown Daily Vindicator predicted in October 1906 that the "popular" Hogan would serve a fourth season as manager of the club, the Ohio Works manager appeared unwilling to negotiate the terms of a new contract without leverage. According to the Vindicator, Hogan publicly mulled an offer presented by a team in Nashville, whose representatives followed him to the train station. The same newspaper article indicated that Hogan later reached a verbal agreement with Ohio Works co-owners Joseph and Thomas McDonald, announcing soon afterwards that he would remain with the local ball club. Yet, by January 1907, the Newark Advocate reported that Hogan wanted to sell the Youngstown franchise. The paper observed that "a move in offering the Youngstown franchise for sale had created a furor in the league". On January 8, 1907, Hogan and Joseph McDonald attended the annual meeting of the National Association of Professional Baseball Clubs in New York City, while the fate of the club remained uncertain. Then, on January 13, The New York Times reported that the Youngstown team would participate in an eight-team "outlaw league" comprising clubs from Elmira, New York; Lancaster, Pennsylvania; Pittsburgh, Reading, Pennsylvania; Scranton, Pennsylvania; Wilkes-Barre, Pennsylvania; and Williamsport, Ohio. The Times described the envisioned league as "the most powerful 'outlaw' league the National Association of Professional Baseball Clubs was ever called upon to oppose", and stated that Hogan would "be at the head of" the Youngstown team. These rather confusing reports were followed by the abrupt sale and relocation of the Ohio Works team in February 1907.

=== Zanesville ===
On February 18, 1907, the Zanesville Signal reported that Hogan had received permission from the McDonald brothers to negotiate a $3,000 deal for the sale of the Youngstown club, including its players, to a group of investors in Zanesville, Ohio. In an interview with the Signal, the manager expressed frustration with the team's former backers, when he said, "Youngstown couldn't or didn't raise enough money to cover a sparrow's blanket". The Zanesville investors reportedly raised an additional $15,000 to enter the team into the Ohio–Pennsylvania League, although they were forced to settle for the less prestigious Pennsylvania–Ohio–Maryland League. The eight-team P-O-M league included clubs from Braddock, Pennsylvania; Charleroi, Pennsylvania; East Liverpool, Ohio; McKeesport, Pennsylvania; Steubenville, Ohio; Uniontown, Pennsylvania; and Washington, Pennsylvania. Meanwhile, Hogan reportedly had some difficulty securing new players for the team. In June 1907, the Marion Daily Mirror described Zanesville's efforts to sign Bill Dithridge, a player in the Baltimore Eastern League, as "merely another of the pipe dreams of one Marty Hogan". The article added, "Dithridge is not to be sold to Zanesville, and he has informed Hogan that he will play with his team under no conditions whatever". The paper did observe, however, that Hogan had signed a Cleveland player named Tate and planned to secure another outfielder, "when three members of the present team will be canned". After settling in Zanesville, Hogan apparently received offers from other teams. Sporting Life reported in June 1907 that Hogan was invited to manage a team in Rochester, New York, but had turned down the offer. Then, in October, Hogan was offered management of yet another league franchise in South Bend, Indiana, but, once again, he declined. He managed the Zanesville ball club for two seasons. During its first season, the team placed first in the eight-team P-O-M League, with a record of 15 wins and seven losses.

In 1908, his final season, the team was christened as the Zanesville Infants and joined the Central League. According to Sporting Life, the "schedule meeting" for the Central League that year was to be held in Zanesville on March 17 (St. Patrick's Day). "According to the plans of the magnates the season this year will consist of 140 games, not any of the club owners being willing to return to the 154-game schedule", the paper reported. The paper added that Hogan was "making light of his task" of signing up players for his team. "His acquaintance with players, especially in the independent ranks, gives him an advantage which few managers have". Sporting Life also reported that by March, Hogan had "signed his outfield, the players accepting terms being [Curt] Elson, Blount, and Miller". Further research is needed to determine the Zanesville Infants' league ranking at the close of the 1908 season, but available information shows that the team neither won the championship nor placed as a runner-up. More information is available on Hogan's dissatisfaction with his situation in Zanesville, which evidently stemmed from increasing limits on his control over the club. An article that appeared in The (Pittsburgh) Gazette Times in December 1908 described Hogan's reasons for leaving the organization. "There were too many directors connected with the Zanesville club to suit Hogan, as each one had his own idea of how a club should be run", the paper reported. "As Hogan has his own, which did not exactly coincide with the numerous directors, he resigned". The Gazette Times praised Hogan's performance in Zanesville, stating that his club "was a pennant contender at all stages of the championship race". The paper added: "He did not have a very good team, but kept the men playing the game at all times and was really the wonder of the [P.O.M.] league".

=== Lancaster Red Roses ===
The following year, in 1909, Hogan relocated to Lancaster, Pennsylvania, where he replaced local ball club manager Clarence "Pop" Foster, who had managed the Red Roses since 1907. Once Hogan signed a contract, Foster moved on to lead another club in Trenton, New Jersey. The Lancaster team's momentum escalated during the 1909 season, and in July of that year, Sporting Life reported that the Red Roses club was drawing positive attention. "The fast pace at which the Lancaster bunch has been going lately has been the talk of the league", the paper stated. "Marty Hogan was not given much consideration as a pennant aspirant when the season opened, but the plucky Red Roses manager has been 'sawing wood' and not talking". Indeed, by the close of the 1909 season, the Lancaster Red Roses had worked up a 75–39 record, seizing the championship of the Tri-State League. As Spalding's Baseball Guide (1910) reported: "Lancaster, under manager Marty Hogan, won its first pennant in the league, and the top rung of the ladder was only gained by the hardest kind of fighting". Sporting Life indicated that Hogan was confident of the outcome early in the season. "After his return from the first trip around the circuit", wrote reporter G. H. Hartley, "Marty said to your correspondent that he saw nothing in the league that was better than his team". Hartley noted that, on the closing day of the season, Hogan accepted the Farnsworth Cup, "the Tri-State trophy", on behalf of his team. "Between the first and second innings the [Lancaster] players presented Manager Marty Hogan with a beautiful silver set and a silver loving cup", he added. The inscribed silver cup reportedly left Hogan "so surprised that he was unable to respond". On September 7, 1909, one day after the contest, the Reading Eagle stated, "A great crowd witnessed the final game, in which Hogan's gallant band trimmed the Trenton wanderers". The newspaper added, "The real enthusiasm was awakened, however, by the floating of the championship pennant, awarded by a Phila. [sic] paper". A key participant in the team's successful performance was a young pitcher named Stan Coveleski, who went on to post a record of 53 wins and 38 losses during his three seasons with Lancaster. He made his professional debut with the Philadelphia Athletics three seasons later. Indeed, the Ogden Standard had praised Hogan as a "live wire" back in February 1909, when he "grabbed up the three brothers of Harry Coveleski of the Phillies, and had them all sign contracts". Highlights of the season may have included an exhibition game with the Philadelphia Phillies, which was scheduled to be held in Lancaster on April 2, 1909.

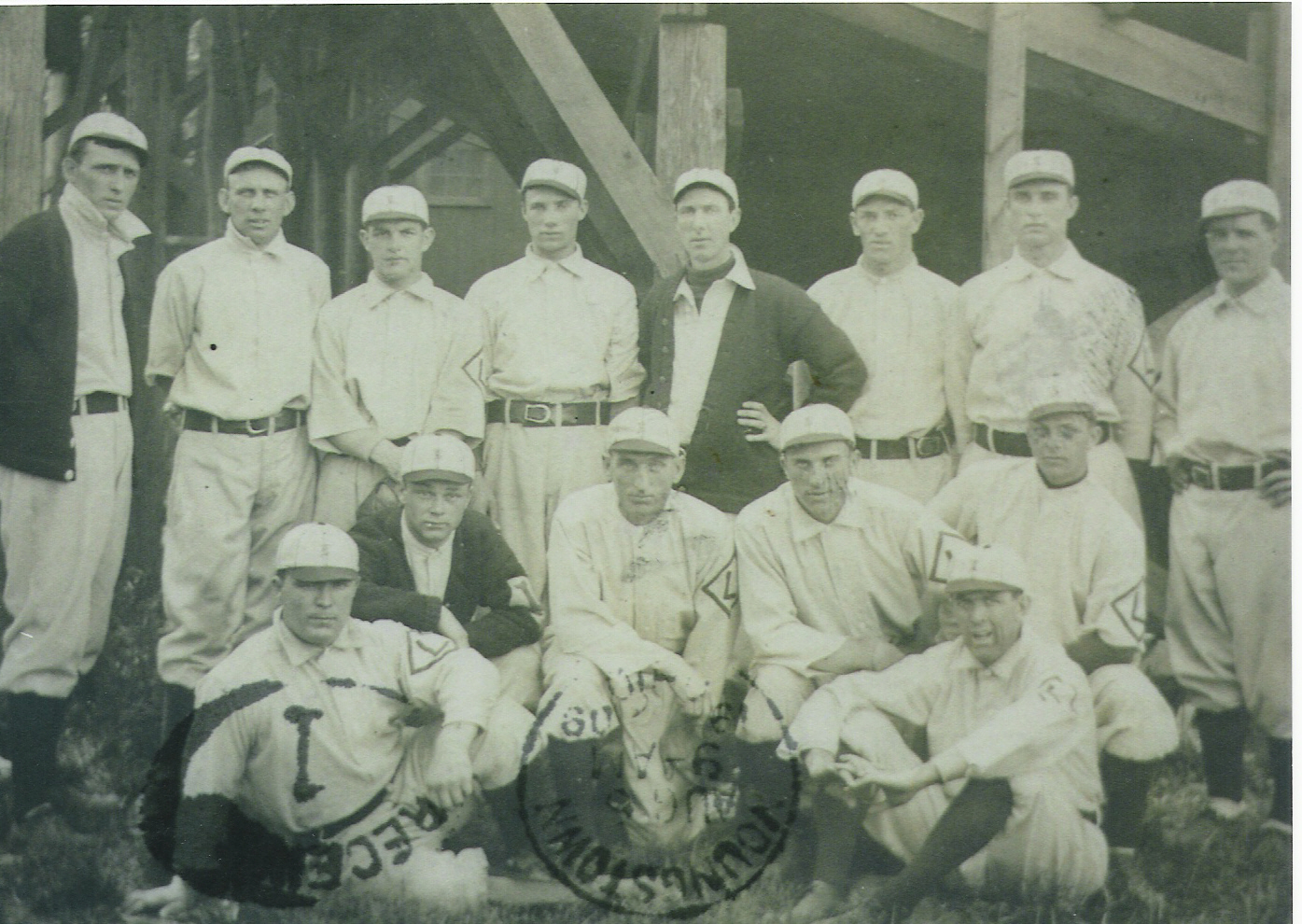
Lancaster Red Roses (1909), with Hogan (standing fourth from right) and Coveleski (left of Hogan).

The following year, however, the Red Roses' performance fell short of the previous season when it placed second, with 63 wins and 47 losses. According to Spalding's Baseball Guide (1911), the Lancaster organization was one of several teams in the league caught off guard by a surprisingly strong new club from Altoona, Pennsylvania, which was "sent along at a clip that practically clinched the season". While the Red Roses pulled out of a mid-season slump, the "Altoonas" prevailed with a 72–38 record. In an article regarding this outcome, Sporting Life stated that "nothing can be found to cast discredit upon the Lancaster team or its popular manager, Marty Hogan". The paper added, "With a team that never stood high in club hitting or fielding, Marty pulled them through and anchored them in second place, which position they attained more by dint of their cleverness in inside work than with their prowess with the stick or in the field". In December 1910, a little more than two months after the article appeared, Hogan reportedly set down roots in Lancaster, opening a cigar shop and billiard hall in the city. His relationship with the Red Roses would not last more than another season, however. In 1911, Hogan's final year as manager of the Lancaster team, the club placed fourth in the eight-team league, with 54 wins and losses, respectively.

Sporting Life reported that Hogan began the 1911 season with relatively modest expectations. The paper stated, "Hogan is not promising a pennant-winning team...but he does promise a good team and means to fight hard for the pennant again". The team's challenges included salary limits that sharply limited its capacity to attract more experienced players. Earlier that year, the Tri-State League's imposition of $1,900 limits for individual salaries had created a stir throughout Lancaster, where fans resented the fact that outgoing clubs had been permitted to vote on an issue that would not affect them. Club president John H. Myers' efforts to persuade the league to "advance the individual salary limit" proved unsuccessful, and Hogan "was directed to secure the best team that can be secured" under the circumstances. In January 1911, Hogan had announced he would "cut out exhibition games and devote the entire preparatory season to hard practice". Hogan added that "the exhibitions do not pay the club, and do harm to the unseasoned players". Ultimately, the 1911 league championship went to a franchise from Reading, Pennsylvania, which "took the lead at the beginning of the season and never was headed until the finish", closing with a record of 74–35.

=== United States Baseball League ===
In March 1912, organizers of a proposed United States Baseball League–described by members of the sports establishment as an "outlaw league"–met in New York City's Hotel Imperial. The league is widely viewed as "a major precursor to the Federal League of 1914–1915". Hogan, who attended the New York meeting, was named as manager of a Cincinnati-based franchise scheduled to compete in the league. (The U.S. Baseball League also established teams in Chicago, Cleveland, Pittsburgh, New York City, Reading, Pennsylvania; Richmond, Virginia; and Washington, D.C.) The following month, however, Hogan was evidently replaced by Hugh McKinnon, who was described in an April New York Times article as manager of the league's Cincinnati franchise. An article that appeared in The New York Times several weeks earlier suggested that McKinnon was originally tapped as manager of the league's Washington franchise. The same article also pointed out that ex-major leaguer George Browne "had been approached by the Washington Club". In the end, Browne was named as head of the Washington team when McKinnon was appointed manager of the Cincinnati club. While these developments shed some light on the outcome, the reasons for Hogan's replacement as manager of the Cincinnati franchise remain uncertain.

In any event, the league did not survive for long. Sports historian Rudolf K. Haerle observed that the U.S. Baseball League "stressed the inherent 'good' of baseball for all individuals and communities, and indicated that it wished to conduct its business in the accepted capitalist style–free competition in the marketplace". The new league, however, quickly incurred the scorn and hostility of the baseball establishment. Burdened with weak leadership, limited financing, poor attendance, and a lack of skillful players, the U.S. Baseball League "folded after about one month of action". In June 1912, when the league ceased operation, the Cincinnati team that Hogan was supposed to manage ranked fourth in the eight-team roster, earning 12 wins and 10 losses. The following year, former players of the Cincinnati club successfully sued the team's owner, John J. Ryan, for unpaid wages. Sporting Life reported that the club's members "received their money in Cincinnati on February 12".

=== Zanesville Flood Sufferers ===
In November 1912, The Youngstown Daily Vindicator reported that Hogan would once again manage a local minor league ball club. The paper added, however, that the former Ohio Works manager was also considering an offer in Zanesville. Hogan evidently led the Zanesville team the previous season. In November 1912, Sporting Life reported that the manager was still mulling his next move when he attended the annual meeting of the National Association in New York. "Marty Hogan, the veteran minor league manager, who is known from end to end of the land as a developer of minor league talent and winner of pennants, could not bear to miss meeting his old friends", the paper stated. "Marty wound up the season with Zanesville and has not definitely decided upon his plans for the coming season". Ultimately, Hogan went to Zanesville, where he managed the Zanesville Flood Sufferers in 1913. The team's nickname was evidently inspired by a massive flood that had devastated cities and towns throughout central and southern Ohio–including Zanesville–in the spring of 1913. In April 1913, Sporting Life noted that the Zanesville club would "stick to the circuit", despite the fact that the city was "hit hard by the recent floods". According to the paper, Zanesville's ballpark was "completely destroyed, but the games will be played at the Fair Grounds".

Earlier, in January 1913, the Flood Sufferers pulled out from the 12-team Central League and joined the newly formed Interstate League, which included eight clubs. According to Sporting Life, the new league was expected to include teams from Akron, Youngstown, Canton, Steubenville, Wheeling, and either Johnstown or McKeesport. In February, the paper confirmed that the Interstate League (which included Johnstown, not McKeesport) had achieved Class B status on the basis of the eight cities' combined populations. Sporting Life, which estimated the total population of the league's participating cities at 412,415, noted that Youngstown (with a population of 79,066) was the largest city in the Interstate League. Later that month, the paper reported that the new league's "salary limit of $2000 makes it imperative for each club to hold down expenses in every way; consequently Marty Hogan, of the Zanesville Club, will be the only bench manager in the league, and he knows how to save his salary in various ways".

During Hogan's tenure as manager of the Zanesville Flood Sufferers, the club took advantage of at least one opportunity to test their skills against a major league club. Sports writer Walter LeConte observed that, on June 15, 1913, the Zanesville team participated in an in-season exhibition game with the New York Giants. When the umpire declared the game forfeited after a disagreement with Giants player Fred Merkle, Hogan "ordered the game continued so the fans could see a 9-inning baseball game". LeConte added that "Hogan even assumed umpiring duties and the game was then concluded". The Giants won the game, with a score of 5–4. Reliable information on the Zanesville club's overall performance is currently unavailable, but an Associated Press report indicated the team had disbanded by late July 1913.

At Zanesville, Hogan signed future Cleveland Indians pitcher Samuel Pond ("Sad Sam") Jones to his first professional contract. Baseball historian Alexander Edelman noted that Jones gained valuable experience as a member of the Zanesville club (including a chance to play against the Giants in an exhibition game), but he added that the player "was only 20 years old and very homesick". When Jones was faced with the prospect of a pay cut, he approached Hogan on the street and demanded that he be released from his contract immediately. Edelman wrote: "In what Sam's son, Paul, would later call 'probably the craziest release in baseball history,' Hogan obliged, writing Jones' release in pencil on the inside of a chewing tobacco packet".

=== Fond du Lac Molls ===
On July 20, 1913, The New York Times reported that Hogan left Zanesville to manage a Fond du Lac franchise in the Illinois-Wisconsin League. According to the article, he planned to bring with him five players from the defunct Zanesville club. Reliable information on the Fond du Lac Molls' overall performance is currently unavailable.

In February 1914, Sporting Life reported that Hogan was considering a return to the Tri-State League. "In a letter to a friend in Lancaster [Pennsylvania] the former Lancaster manager stated that the Trenton [New Jersey] Club was after him and that there was [sic] good prospects of both sides coming to terms", the paper stated. "Marty is anxious to get back in the Tri-State, where he won fame as a manager". The paper added that Hogan, at that point, was working as a "successful businessman" in Youngstown, Ohio. The same edition of Sporting Life, however, carried a wire report noting that the Trenton club's new owner, W. J. Morris, had signed Zeke Wrigley as team manager. The report observed, "Manager Wrigley was strongly recommended to the club by Connie Mack". (Wrigley, a former major league infielder, had earlier pursued a position on the Tri-State League's umpire staff, and he was not initially in the running for the position of Trenton club manager.) Further research will be required to determine whether Hogan's career as a minor league manager continued after this point.

== Personal life ==
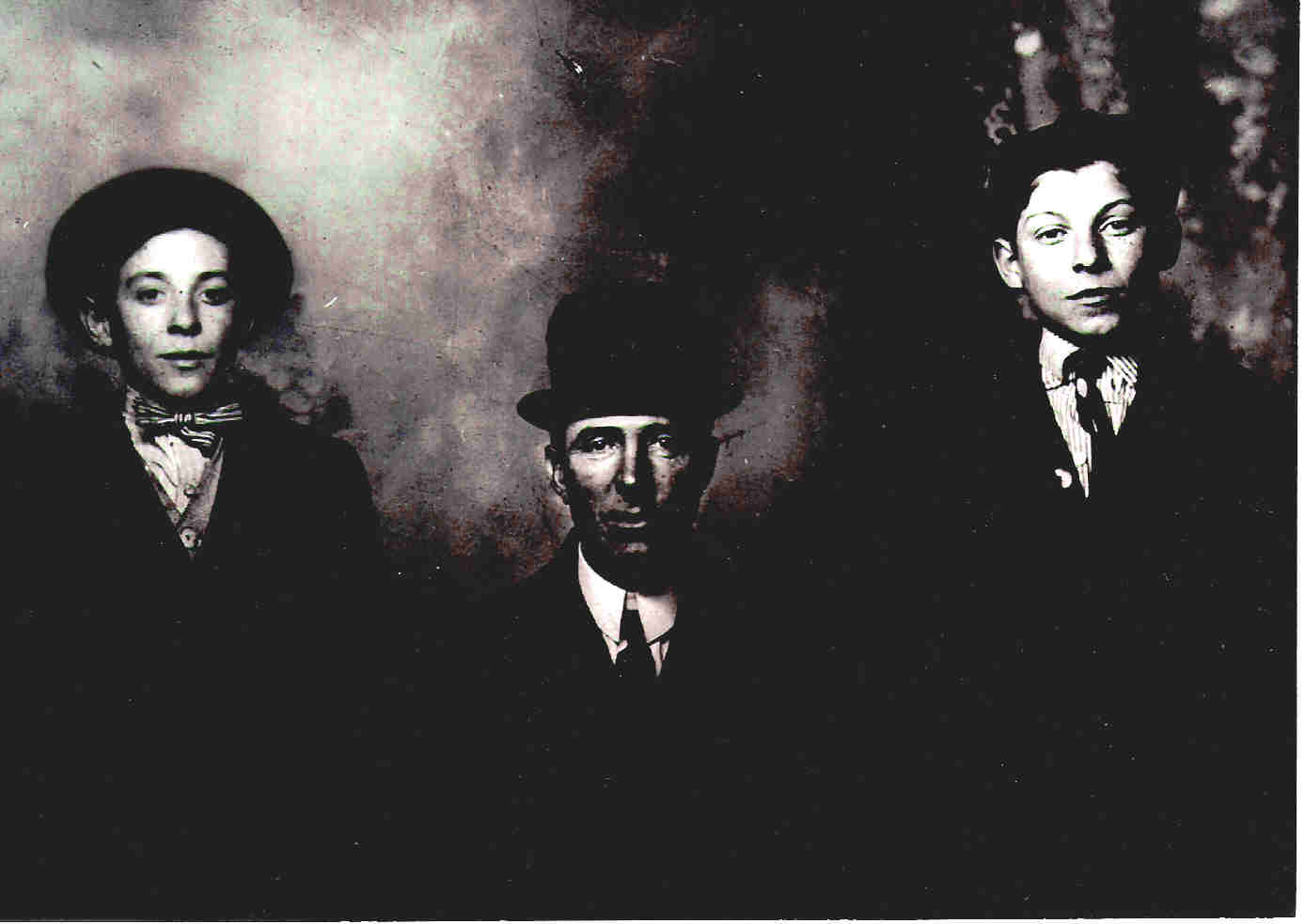
Marty Hogan (center), with nephews Edward (right) and Raymond (left), about 1912.

Hogan was married to the former Agnes Daugherty on October 28, 1896, in St. Columba Church, in Youngstown, Ohio. After a wedding trip, the couple initially settled in Indianapolis. Although Hogan's obituary makes no reference to children, he and his wife evidently raised an adopted child, Amy M. Hogan (born Amy Deagon), who died at the age of 16 in a 1921 automobile accident. A front-page article in the Vindicator reported that Amy Hogan was one of three passengers in an automobile whose driver had failed to slow down at a curve in the road and skidded into a telephone pole near Hubbard, Ohio. The article noted that Amy Hogan had recently graduated from Ursuline Academy and described her as "a girl of exceptional talents, being especially prominent in local amateur theatricals and entertainments". Records at Youngstown's Calvary Cemetery show that Amy Hogan was buried in the same plot as her adoptive parents. Published cemetery records also suggest that Martin Hogan's wife, Agnes Hogan, gave birth to an unnamed infant, who died on September 6, 1898. The infant was buried in a section of the cemetery usually reserved for unbaptized children and the indigent. Agnes (Hogan) Moreland died on February 7, 1950, in Salem, Ohio.

Throughout his sports career, Hogan's pastimes included trap shooting. In July 1911, when he was manager of the Lancaster Red Roses, Sporting Life reported, "Marty shoots targets very well and can be looked to for high scores once he gets a little shooting". Hogan's obituary noted that, at some point, he helped to organize the Youngstown Gun Club.

Upon returning to Youngstown, Hogan supervised the athletic training of his youngest nephews, Edward and Raymond Hogan, who became sports stars at Rayen High School. In the early 1920s, Edward Hogan emerged as a track and field standout at the University of Notre Dame, where he trained under coach Knute Rockne.

== Final years ==
In the mid-1910s, Hogan permanently resettled in Youngstown, where he became athletic director of Thomas Field, a ballpark owned by the local Brier Hill Industrial Works. Prior to the enforcement of the Volstead Act, he was also employed as a clerk at Buckley & Hogan, a downtown saloon operated by his older brother, Patrick J. Hogan, Jr., and his business partner, John J. Buckley, Sr. Further research will be required to determine Martin Hogan's level of involvement, if any, in local baseball during the last decade of his life.

Martin F. Hogan was only 54 years old when he died at his north side home from injuries sustained months earlier in an auto accident. Several blood transfusions failed to revive him, and a bout with pneumonia proved fatal. Funeral services for Hogan were held at St. Columba Church, and he was buried at Youngstown's Calvary Cemetery. His wife, Agnes, survived him along with his brother, Patrick. A sister, Mrs. John Dillon, had died several years earlier. Hogan's obituary in The Youngstown Daily Vindicator highlighted his contributions to organized sports, observing that many young athletes he trained and managed went on to careers in major league baseball. Major league players who worked with Hogan during his years as a minor league manager included Roy Castleton, Stan Coveleski, Lee Fohl, Sam Jones, Billy Phyle, and Louis Schettler. His disputed baserunning record remains a curious footnote in American baseball history.
