= Edward J. Hogan =

American college track & field athlete (1897-1976)

- Born: December 10, 1897; Youngstown, Ohio
- Died: March 24, 1976 (aged 78); Monterey Park, California

Edward J. Hogan (December 10, 1897 – March 24, 1976) was a track and field standout at the University of Notre Dame in the early 1920s, under legendary coach Knute Rockne. He placed in numerous track and field events and reportedly trained for the 1924 Olympics. Hogan's photograph is featured on Notre Dame's sports "Wall of Honor".

Earlier in his career, as a student athlete at Youngstown, Ohio's Rayen School, Hogan established a longstanding state record in the javelin throw. Four decades after his high school graduation, his image was included in Ohio artist John Benninger's mural of Rayen School history, which was recently removed from the former high school building for cleaning and restoration.

== Formative years ==
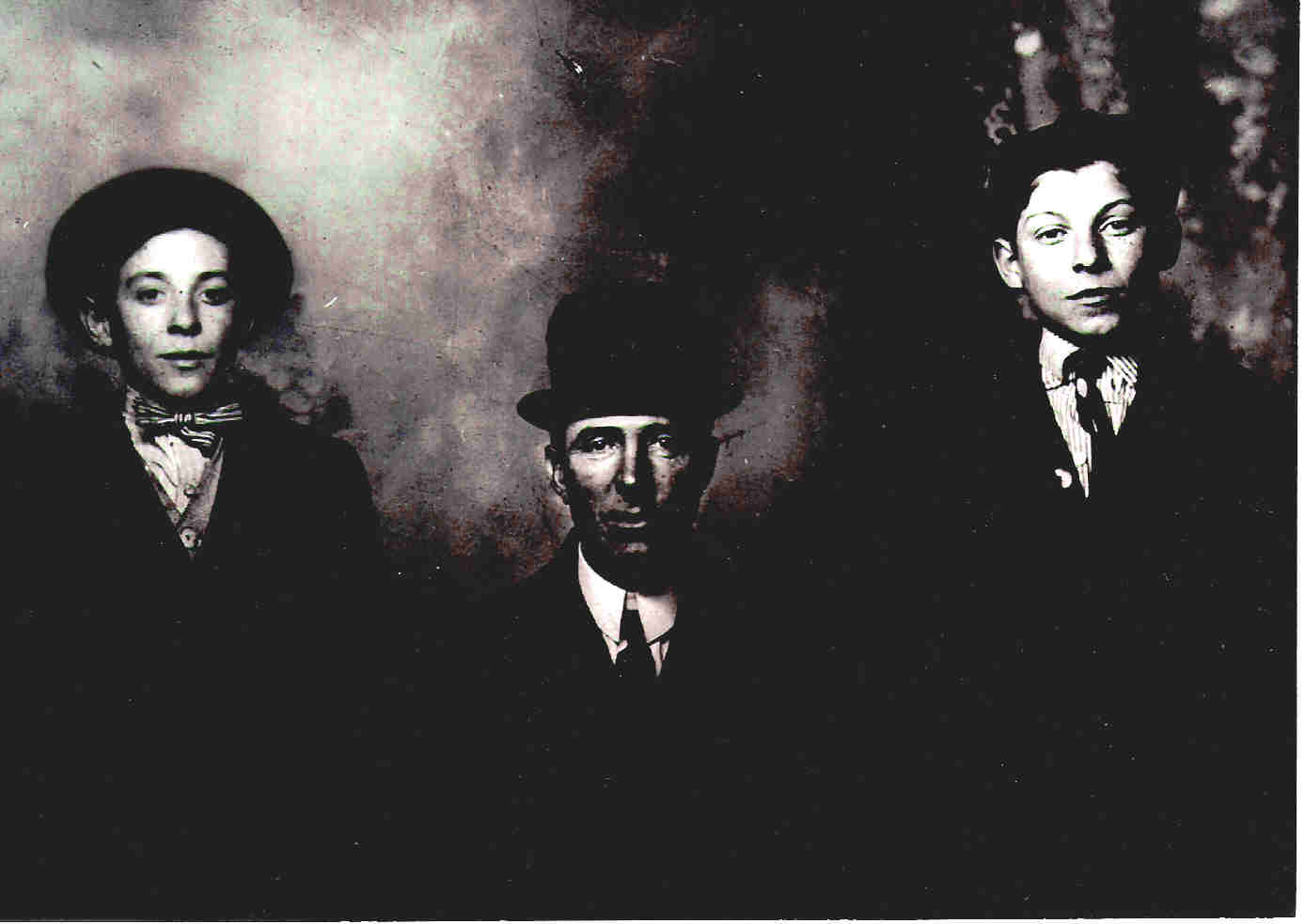
Edward Hogan (right), with uncle Marty Hogan (center) and brother Raymond (left).

Hogan was born in Youngstown's Westlake's Crossing district, the third surviving son of Patrick J. Hogan, a "roller" at the Union Iron & Steel Company, and Mary (Cullinan) Hogan, an immigrant from Ballyallinan, County Limerick, Ireland.

Athletic competition was encouraged in the Hogan household. Edward Hogan's father, Patrick Hogan, had been a semi-professional boxer, and his uncle, Martin F. Hogan, was a former major league pitcher who managed the Youngstown Ohio Works, a local minor league team.

Hogan enrolled at The Rayen School in 1915. His earliest visibility was as a halfback for the Rayen football team, where he played a decisive role in the school's victory over rival South High School. For all his success on the gridiron, however, Hogan's greatest feats were in track and field. The Rayen Record reported, in June 1917, that Hogan was part of the school's first "triumvirate" in track and field. During a field meet at Mt. Union College, on May 18, 1917, he helped Rayen secure third place in the state. He also threw the javelin 153 feet and eight inches, to establish a state record that stood for decades.

== Notre Dame sports career ==
Following a stint in the U.S. Naval Reserve during World War I, Hogan enrolled at the University of Notre Dame, where he reportedly intended to play football under coach Rockne. Hogan's athletic career took an unexpected turn, however, when Rockne observed as Hogan demonstrated a pole-vaulting technique to a member of the school's track and field team. An impressed Rockne, who also coached track, informed Hogan that he was no longer a member of the football team. Hogan proved to be a strong and consistent performer on Notre Dame's outdoor varsity track team from 1921 to 1923, where he excelled at the pole vault and broad jump.

In 1922, Hogan sustained an injury during practice that placed him in the infirmary. Nevertheless, when Notre Dame faced Wabash College in Indianapolis, on May 9, 1922, Hogan placed first in both the running broad jump (19 feet and 11 3/4 inches) and pole vault (11 feet and two inches). On March 10, 1922, during a meet with the University of Wisconsin, in Madison, he took first in the pole vault, clearing a height of 12 feet and three inches.

Named as a "monogram man" in his final season, Hogan won first place in the pole vault in a May 19, 1923, meet with Michigan Agricultural College, and tied for fifth in the broad jump at the Western Intercollegiate Meet, on June 2–3. According to the 1923 Notre Dame yearbook, The Dome: "Eddie Hogan, who consistently cleared the bar in the pole vault at twelve feet, accounted for many points during the season". Hogan was joined on the track team by his roommate Elmer Layden, another versatile athlete who placed first in the 100-yard dash during the May meet with Michigan "Aggie". He is said to have trained for the 1924 Paris Olympics but was injured during practice and did not participate.

Hogan's portrait on the University of Notre Dame's Wall of Honor is a graduation photo rather than an official sports portrait. He is the only honored athlete to be shown wearing a mortarboard. (Hogan was reportedly ill on the morning that the official portrait was scheduled to be taken.)

== Later years ==
On November 1, 1923, Hogan married the former Elizabeth Agnes Gottschalk, of Salem, Ohio, in a ceremony in South Bend, Indiana. His best man was former teammate Layden. After graduation from Notre Dame's law program, Hogan settled in Canton, Ohio, where he served as athletic director at the city's Knights of Columbus facility and helped organize the Canton Catholic Youth Center. In 1927, he relocated to Los Angeles, California, where he practiced law as a patent attorney. After the death of his first wife, in 1950, Hogan moved from South Gate, California, to San Gabriel, California.

On November 10, 1951, he married the former Ilo Artance Henriette Wilson. The couple had three children. In 1976, after a bout with lung cancer, Hogan died at Veteran's Hospital, in Long Beach, California. Services were held in San Gabriel, and he was buried in Monterey Park, California. His death was noted in his hometown, where many residents still recalled him as the youthful athlete who threw a decisive pass in the Rayen-South game 60 years earlier.
