= Homestead Steel Workers =

The Homestead Steel Workers were a professional baseball team based Homestead, Pennsylvania. The club played in the Ohio–Pennsylvania League in 1905 and was managed by Howard Risher. Lee Fohl, Rube Sellers and Hughie Tate played for the club. It is the only known professional baseball team to be based in Homestead.
