= Marion Drummers =

The Marion Drummers were an Ohio–Pennsylvania League minor league baseball team that played in 1907. Notable players include Sandy Burk, Jake Daubert, Delos Drake, Charlie Luskey and Hughie Tate. Baseball Reference lists the team as the Marion Moguls., though other sources list them as the Drummers. The team was based in Marion, Ohio.
