= Lancaster Lanks =

- 1905–1911; Lancaster, Ohio

Minor league affiliations
- Previous classes: Class D (1908–1911); Class C (1905–1907)
- Previous leagues: Ohio State League (1908–1911); Ohio–Pennsylvania League (1905–1907)

The Lancaster Lanks, based in Lancaster, Ohio, were a minor league baseball team that existed from 1905 to 1911. They played in the Ohio–Pennsylvania League from 1905 to 1907, and the Ohio State League from 1908 to 1912. On June 18, 1912, they moved to Atlantic City, New Jersey to represent Atlantic City in the Tri-State League. As the Lancaster Lanks that season, they went 15-19.

Their manager in 1905 was Lefty Killen. In 1906, they were managed by Curt Elston and William Gray. In 1907, they were managed by James Breen and Elston. George Fox managed them in 1908 and 1909, and in 1910 they were managed by Albert McClintock and Heinie Peitz. In 1911 they were managed by Charles Riehl and Gus Epler. John Castle managed them in 1912.
