= Al Humphrey =

American baseball player (1886-1961)

- Outfielder
- Born: February 28, 1886; Ashtabula, Ohio, U.S.
- Died: May 13, 1961 (aged 75); Ashtabula, Ohio, U.S.
- Batted: Left Threw: Right

MLB debut
- September 1, 1911, for the Brooklyn Dodgers

Last MLB appearance
- September 7, 1911, for the Brooklyn Dodgers

MLB statistics
- Batting average: .185
- Home runs: 0
- Runs batted in: 0
- Stats at Baseball Reference

Teams
- Brooklyn Dodgers (1911)

Alfred Humphrey (February 28, 1886 – May 13, 1961) was an American outfielder in Major League Baseball. He played in eight games for the 1911 Brooklyn Dodgers. Later, he served as the chief of the enforcement division of the Ohio State Liquor Department from 1935 to 1939.

== Biography ==
Humphrey was born in Ashtabula, Ohio, the son of Russell and May (nee Castle) Humphrey. He joined the Charlotte Hornets minor league baseball team for the 1909 season. Initially a pitcher, by 1911 he had converted to an outfielder and was signed by the Youngstown Steelmen of the Ohio-Pennsylvania League. In August 1911, the Brooklyn Dodgers (then called the Superbas) purchased his rights. Humphrey made his major league debut in the second game of a doubleheader against Boston on 1 September, in which he hit a single off the first pitch he received. However, his career in Brooklyn would be short-lived, playing only eight games. Before the end of the month, he was released to Toronto's minor league team. He announced the following February that he intended to give up baseball and would become a farmer, partly because he had recently gotten married.

Farming apparently did not pan out, as by 1932 he was an inspector for Ohio's Prohibition agency. In 1935, he was promoted to head of the Ohio Liquor Department's enforcement division following the dismissal and death of his predecessor, Edmond G. Mathews. Beginning in 1937, a series of scandals shook the department. One inspector was found by an Ohio Senate investigation to have illegally sold liquor on commission while working for the department. This was followed by a broader investigation into graft within the department, during which the investigating committee threatened to "level [Humphrey's] department to the ground and reduce it to ruins." This further expanded into inquiries of other state departments, until Governor Martin L. Davey requested it be halted. Humphrey was subsequently dismissed from his position in early 1939, and the staffing of the liquor enforcement division was cut in half.

== Sources ==
- Career statistics from Baseball Reference · Baseball Reference (Minors) · Retrosheet · Baseball Almanac
