= Youngstown Ohio Works =

US baseball team

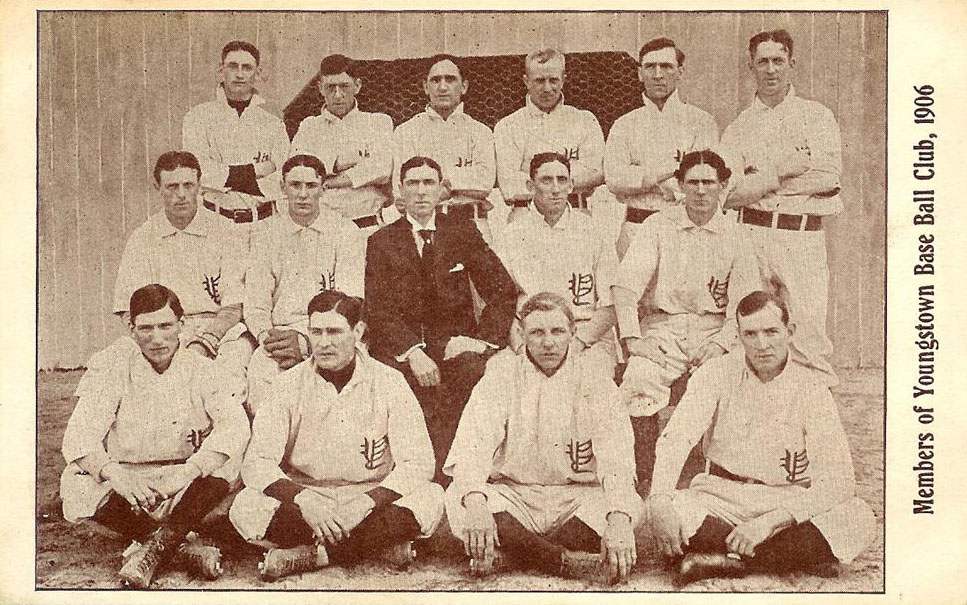
Youngstown Ohio Works (1906), with pitcher Roy Castleton seated in second row, second from left

The Youngstown Ohio Works baseball team was a minor league club that was known for winning the premier championship of the Ohio–Pennsylvania League in 1905, and for launching the professional career of pitcher Roy Castleton a year later. A training ground for several players and officials who later established careers in Major League Baseball, the team proved a formidable regional competitor and also won the 1906 league championship.

During its brief span of activity, the Ohio Works team faced challenges that reflected common difficulties within the Ohio–Pennsylvania League, including weak financial support for teams. Following a dispute over funding, the team's owners sold the club to outside investors, just a few months before the opening of the 1907 season.

The club's strong record and regional visibility spurred the growth of amateur and minor league baseball in the Youngstown area, and the community's minor league teams produced notable players throughout the first half of the 20th century. In the late 1990s, this tradition was rekindled, with the establishment of the Mahoning Valley Scrappers, a minor league team based in neighboring Niles, Ohio.

== Formation and league championship ==
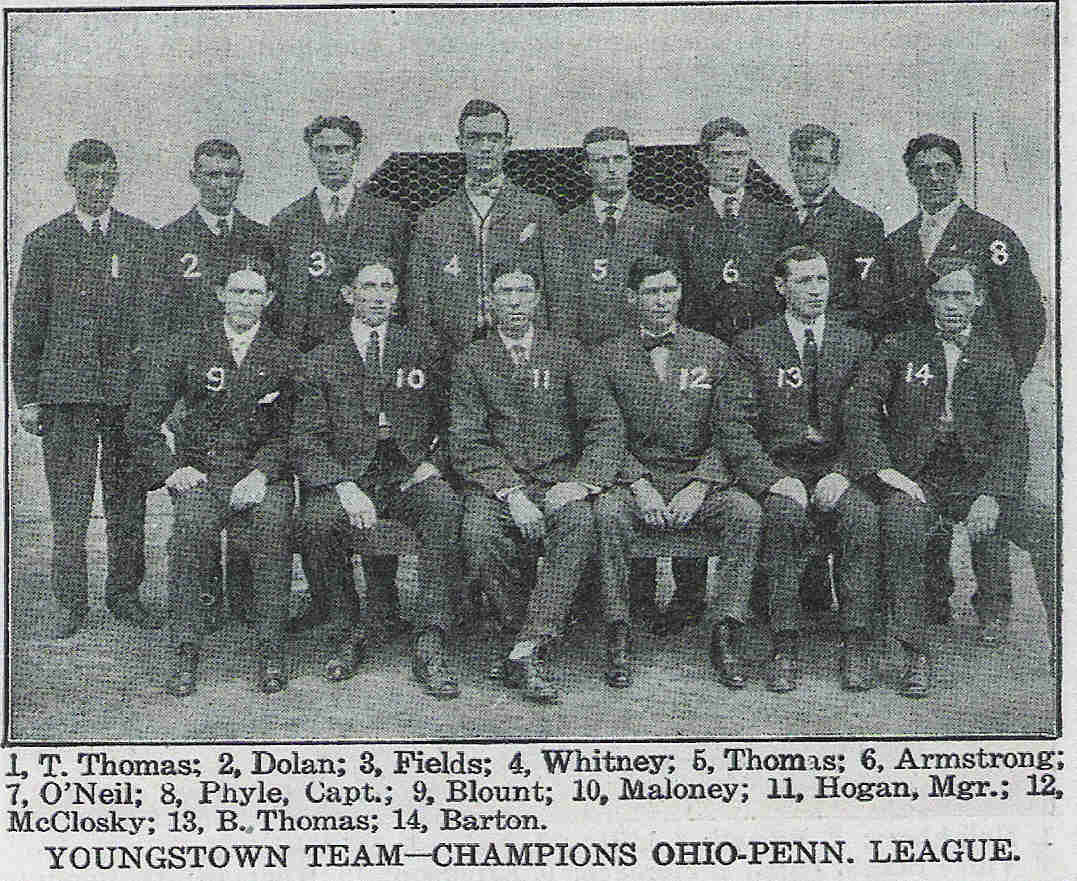
O – P League Champions (1905)

The Ohio Works team was organized in Youngstown, in 1902, under the sponsorship of Joseph A. McDonald, superintendent of the Ohio Works of the Carnegie Steel Company. In 1905, the club joined the Class C Division, Ohio–Pennsylvania League, which was founded that year in Akron, Ohio, by veteran ballplayer Charlie Morton. The league's Ohio members included clubs from Akron, Barberton, Bucyrus, Canton, Kent, Lima, Massillon, Mount Vernon, Newark, Niles, Steubenville, Washington, Wooster, Youngstown, and Zanesville, while Pennsylvania was initially represented by teams from Braddock, Butler, Homestead, and Sharon. Within the first two weeks of the season, clubs from Lancaster and McKeesport also joined the league. Only eight of the original 21 participating clubs finished the 1905 season. These included clubs from Akron, Homestead, Lancaster, Newark, Niles, Sharon, Youngstown, and Zanesville. The name, "Youngstown Ohio Works", became officially associated with the Youngstown team when it joined the Ohio–Pennsylvania League. From the outset, the Youngstown ball club was managed by ex-major leaguer Marty Hogan, a former outfielder for the Cincinnati Reds and St. Louis Browns.

The team opened the 1905 season with an unexpected 4–1 loss to the Canton Protectives, inspiring a local newspaper to comment that the Youngstown team made "as many errors as hits while Canton fielded almost perfectly and hit opportunely". The Ohio Works club gained steam and began to win games. On May 11, 1905, the Youngstown team garnered controversy when The Akron Times-Democrat reported that the Ohio Works' sponsors provided player salaries that nearly doubled those offered by other clubs in the Ohio–Pennsylvania League. In a report on the outcry in Akron, The Youngstown Daily Vindicator warned that, "if the Youngstown backers keep adding and force the other clubs to add to the salaries, it is a question of only a short time until independent baseball will be an impossibility". The newspaper article concluded that the large salaries provided by the Ohio Works's sponsors placed a special burden on teams based in "smaller cities".

Competition among league participants was intense, and games were often raucous affairs. On July 16, 1905, a riot broke out during a contest with a team in neighboring Niles, Ohio. According to a newspaper account, the trouble began when two female fans became involved in a "hair-pulling fight". At one point, two "well-known men" were arrested for "taking an umbrella from a woman and breaking it after she had been annoying them with it". Finally, dozens of fans swarmed into the field, where they "pushed around the umpire and interfered with the defensive play of the Youngstown fielders".

In September 1905, the Youngstown Ohio Works won the first league championship, though sources disagree on the club's final record. This confusion may be due to the disorganized nature of the new league, with its sprawling roster of teams. According to the Spalding Guide (1906), "The failure to furnish official reports was probably due to the clubs being new to a league". Baseball researcher Jim Holl summarizes the varied accounts as follows: "The Reach Guide (1906) credits Youngstown with an 84–32 won–lost record where the Spalding Guide of the same year list a 90–35 record. The Encyclopedia of Minor League Baseball (1993) tells a third story, giving Youngstown an 88–35 mark". Despite this uncertainty over the club's record, its championship status was not in dispute, and the team became popularly known as "the Champs". This moniker, however, was not officially connected to a Youngstown-based ball club until 1907, when it became the legal name of the Ohio Works' local successors.

== Final season ==
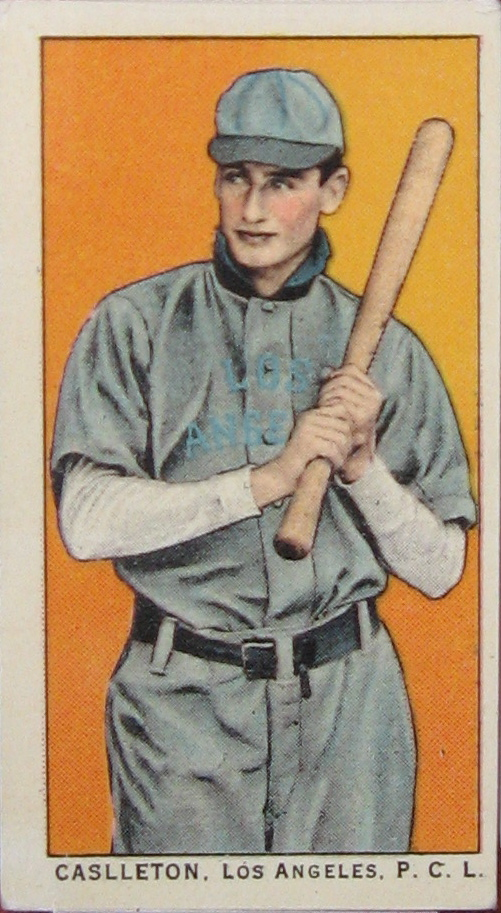
Roy Castleton

By the outset of the 1906 season, the Ohio–Pennsylvania League had trimmed down to a more manageable eight teams. Departing teams included franchises from Barberton, Braddock, Bucyrus, Butler, Canton, Homestead, Kent, Lima, Massillon, McKeesport, Mount Vernon, Niles, Steubenville, Washington, and Wooster. At the same time, the league attracted new teams from New Castle, Pennsylvania, and Mansfield, Ohio.

The Ohio Works team opened with 16 players, three of whom had been part of the club during the 1905 season. The team's lineup included William J. Maloney of Bradford, Kentucky; Will M. Thomas of Morristown, Pennsylvania; Tommy Thomas of Piqua, Ohio; Lee Fohl of Allegheny, Pennsylvania; Louis Schettler of Pittsburgh, Pennsylvania; "Dotty" Freck of Columbus, Ohio; A. C. McClintock of Columbus; Roy Castleton of Salt Lake City, Utah; Lewis Groh of Rochester, New York; John Kennedy of Youngstown, Charles Crouse of Detroit, Michigan; Roy Chase of Andover, Ohio; Forrester J. Dressner of Garrettsville, Pennsylvania; Harry Schwartz of Cleveland, Ohio; and Roy Gould of Middlesex, Pennsylvania. Other players associated with the club during the 1906 season were Edward Hilley, Curley Blount, and Charles McCloskey.

The Youngstown club kicked off the 1906 season with an exhibition game against a Cleveland team, emerging as victors in a close contest of 3–4. "Up till the closing minutes it looked like the visiting team, the Cleveland Leaders, would stow the contest away in their bat-bags and leave the field on top", the Vindicator reported. "The finish was exciting, and 400 fanatics who took chances on pneumonia had a chance to warm up and go home in good spirits.". The paper stated that, at the top of the first inning, the Cleveland team was leading by one point, when "the Youngstown gentlemen got busy in the most approved style". According to the Vindicator, Ohio Works player Curley Blount "stepped in front of a slow pitched ball and was sent to third", while A. C. McClintock "stole second with all hands asleep". At this point, the paper added, "[Charles] McCloskey took another base hit and Blount and McClintock scored". The Vindicator's summary of the game called attention to pitcher Roy Castleton, "who struck out all three batters in the tenth and got one in the ninth". The paper described McClintock and McCloskey (the "two Macs") as the Youngstown club's "star hitters".

Early in the season, as the Ohio Works team prepared for a second game with the Zanesville Moguls (close rivals in the 1905 championship games), the club manager, Hogan, spoke confidently on their chances of capturing the league pennant. "If the boys go through the season as they are playing now, we will have no trouble winning out", he said to a reporter with The Youngstown Daily Vindicator. "Our pitchers are in good condition and are holding the opposing batsmen to few hits. It is the pitching staff that has saved many a game for us. We have no .350 batters on the club, but any man on it is liable to step in and break up a game". A local newspaper confirmed Hogan's assessment of the team, observing that only one player, outfielder Will Thomas, had worked up a batting average of .306. Nevertheless, as Hogan predicted, the team defeated the Moguls, with a final score of 11–8. The game's highlights included the pitching of "Long John" Kennedy, who kept the Moguls to seven hits, and the batting of Edward Hilley, who "unloosened a drive to middle field that permitted him to go all the way around".

Hogan's overall confidence in the club was rewarded. The Youngstown team closed the season with an 84–53 record and won its second consecutive Ohio–Pennsylvania League championship. The star of the Ohio Works team was a gangling, left-handed pitcher named Roy Castleton, a Utah native who went on to pitch for the New York Highlanders and Cincinnati Reds. On August 17, 1906, Castleton gained national recognition when he pitched a perfect game against rival Akron, shutting them out at 4–0. With Castleton's assistance, the Youngstown Ohio Works claimed its third consecutive Ohio state pennant, a prize distinct from the league championship.

== Dissolution ==
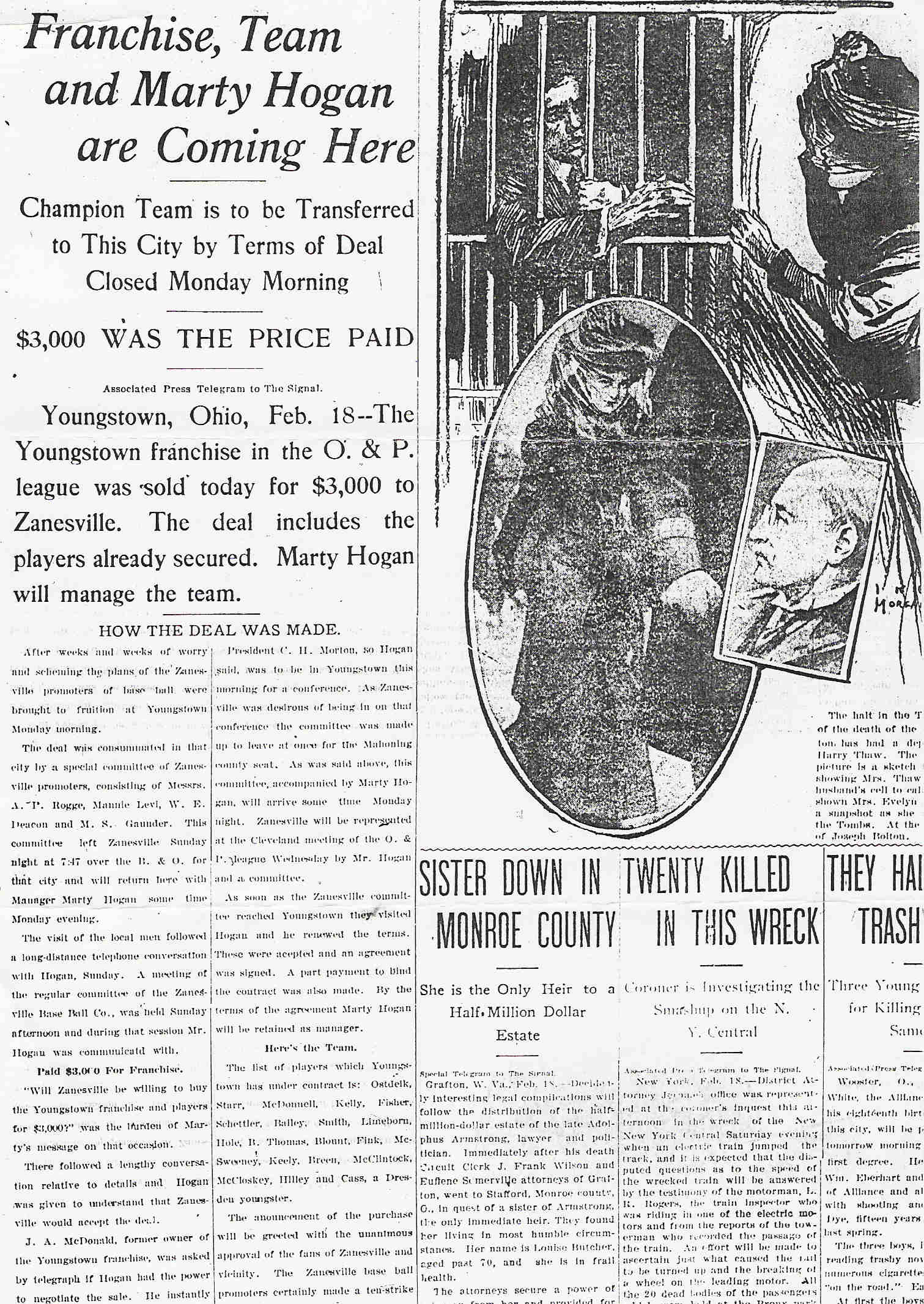
Zanesville Signal, February 18, 1907

In the wake of the Ohio Works' second league championship, steps were taken to incorporate the club. Sporting Life noted in December 1906 that the team's backers, Joseph and Thomas McDonald (superintendent and assistant superintendent, respectively, of the Ohio Works of the Carnegie Steel Company) were compelled to invite additional investors because of planned (and costly) improvements at the steel plant. "The incorporators of the club will be Thomas McDonald, Joseph McDonald, Thomas Carr, Thomas Carter and Marty Hogan", the paper stated. "Manager Hogan will be given even more control of the team next season than he has had. Heretofore he has had the entire control of the team and transacted most of the business".

At some point, disagreements over funding evidently arose between the McDonald brothers and Hogan. On February 18, 1907, the Zanesville Signal reported that Hogan had received permission from "the Messrs. McDonald" (Joseph and Thomas) to negotiate a $3,000 deal for the sale of the team, including its players, to a group of Zanesville investors. The following day, Hogan was quoted as saying, "Youngstown couldn't or didn't raise enough money to cover a sparrow's blanket". The ball club manager's evident frustration during this period was reflected in comments published in The Youngstown Daily Vindicator almost a week after the team's sale. When questioned on his widely publicized decision to resign as manager of the Youngstown club before the opening of the 1907 season, Hogan reportedly said that he had received "the short end of the deal". No reference was made to the club's sale.

The former Ohio Works manager was apparently not the only observer to suggest that Joseph McDonald engaged in "unsportsmanlike tactics". A feature story, that appeared in The Youngstown Daily Vindicator in 1920, stated that McDonald took deliberate steps in 1907 to replace the Ohio Works team with a more seasoned club from Homestead, Pennsylvania. The new club became known officially as the "Youngstown Champs". Rumors of McDonald's supposed strategy apparently angered local baseball fans. According to the 1920 feature article, the Youngstown media highlighted the Champs' unexpected loss to the amateur Rayen Athletics in 1907. At this point McDonald's relationship with the club was less direct. According to Sporting Life, the Youngstown franchise had been "declared forfeit" in early 1907, on the recommendation of the Akron club; it was subsequently "awarded" to a recently established baseball company. "This was only a formality to make legal the actions taken by Magnate [Joseph] McDonald when they turned over the old franchise to the newly organized company in Youngstown", the paper reported. In any event, the Youngstown Champs went on to win the Ohio–Pennsylvania League championship.

Meanwhile, former Ohio Works players in Zanesville quickly regained their momentum. In March 1907, the new club was admitted into the Pennsylvania–Ohio–Maryland League, a Division D league. By the close of the 1907 season, the club had seized the championship of the eight-team P-O-M league. In 1908, Hogan's final season as manager, the team was christened as the Zanesville Infants and joined the Central League. Further research is needed to determine the Zanesville Infants' league ranking at the close of the 1908 season, but available information shows that the team neither won the championship nor placed as a runner-up.

With the exception of a few notable figures, the progress of former Ohio Works players is difficult to track. After leaving the club at the end of the 1906 season, Roy Castleton went on to pitch for the New York Highlanders and Cincinnati Reds. Lee Fohl, another noteworthy alumnus, managed the Cleveland Indians between 1915 and 1919. Fohl later served as manager of the St. Louis Browns and Boston Red Sox. Although Fohl was often criticized as a manager, sports journalist John J. Ward (writing in August 1924) credited him, to a large extent, for the early successes of the Red Sox, an underdog that briefly challenged the New York Yankees and Washington Senators before slipping to seventh place in the eight-team American League. Former major leaguer Billy Phyle, who played for the Ohio Works team during the 1905 season, went on to the St. Louis Cardinals in 1906. A fourth ex-team member, Louis Schettler, played for the Philadelphia Phillies during the 1910 season. Schettler (a Pittsburgh native) eventually settled in Youngstown, where he died in 1960.

Much is known about the subsequent career of the team's ex-manager. In 1909, Marty Hogan moved to Lancaster, Pennsylvania, where he signed future Hall of Fame pitcher Stan Coveleski to his first professional contract. In 1909, the Lancaster Red Roses worked up a 75–39 record, seizing the championship of the Tri-State League. As Spalding's Baseball Guide (1910) reported: "Lancaster, under manager Marty Hogan, won its first pennant in the league, and the top rung of the ladder was only gained by the hardest kind of fighting". Hogan went on to manage clubs in Zanesville and Fond du Lac, Wisconsin. In 1913, during a stint in Zanesville, the manager signed pitcher Sam Jones to his first professional contract. In the mid-1910s, Hogan permanently resettled in Youngstown, where he died in 1923, several months after being injured in an automobile accident.

== Legacy ==
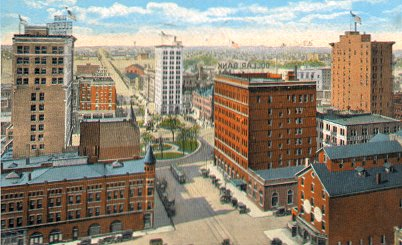
Youngstown, Ohio

The Youngstown Ohio Works team gave several members a "shot" at the major leagues, and played an indirect role in launching the career of Hall of Fame umpire Billy Evans. On September 1, 1903, Evans, a reporter at The Youngstown Daily Vindicator, was assigned to cover a game between the Ohio Works and the Homestead Library Athletic Club that was held in Youngstown. Evans took his first step toward a legendary career when club manager Hogan offered him $15 to fill an umpire vacancy. (In 1905, Evans received a major career boost from Youngstown native Jimmy McAleer, who recommended Evans to the American League.)

The story of the Ohio Works team proved to be an early chapter in Youngstown's long history of amateur and minor league baseball. In the 1930s and 1940s, the city was a frequent host of the National Amateur Baseball Federation (NABF) championship. NABF officials praised the community for the condition of its sandlot baseball diamonds, which they rated as among the best in the country. During the first half of the 20th century, Youngstown-based teams provided experience and exposure to future major league players such as Everett Scott, Floyd Baker, and Johnny Kucab. Today, the Youngstown–Warren area is home base to the Mahoning Valley Scrappers, a collegiate summer baseball team and former minor league team, that currently plays in the MLB Draft League.
