= Mount Vernon Clippers =

The Mount Vernon Clippers were an Ohio–Pennsylvania League minor league baseball team based in Mount Vernon, Ohio that played in 1905. The team – the only known club to come out of Mount Vernon – was managed by Bill Goodrich. The team was called "Bill's Clippers" by local news media.
