= Butler Bucks =

- 1905–1908; Butler, Pennsylvania

Minor league affiliations
- Class: Class C (1908); Class D (1906–1907); Class C (1905)
- League: Ohio–Pennsylvania League (1908); Western Pennsylvania League (1907); Pennsylvania–Ohio–Maryland League (1906); Ohio–Pennsylvania League (1905)

Team data
- Name: Butler (1908); Butler White Sox (1907); Butler (1906); Butler Bucks (1905)

The Butler Bucks was the first name of a minor league baseball club based in Butler, Pennsylvania, from 1905 until 1908. The team was first established in 1905 as the Bucks, in honor of the team's manager, Ward Buckminister. The team then played their 1906 season in the Pennsylvania–Ohio–Maryland League and posted a 16-16 record, before moving to Piedmont, West Virginia, on July 14, 1906. In Piedmont the team posted a 1-20 record, before moving to Charleroi, Pennsylvania, on August 6, 1906, to finish up the season.

The team returned to Butler in 1907 as the Butler White Sox, a member of the Western Pennsylvania League. Managed by Alfred Lawson, a former player for the Pittsburgh Alleghenys and the Boston Beaneaters, the team posted a 58-44 record for second place in the league standings. The team began the season in Girard, Ohio, as an unnamed team, but on May 19, 1908, it moved to Butler. However the team's presence in Butler was short-lived. On June 15, 1908, the team moved to Erie, Pennsylvania, to become the Erie Sailors.

Butler would be without a professional baseball team until the Butler Indians were established in 1934.

== Year-by-year record ==
Year	Record	Finish	Manager	Playoffs
1905	1-7	NA	Ward Buckminister	
1906	26 70	8th	Thomas Lindsay	Butler moved to Piedmont, West Virginia, on July 14; Piedmont then moved to Charleroi on August 6
1907	58-44	2nd	Alfred Lawson, Jake Jacobsen, Eddie Linneborn & William Harkins	
1908	42 79	8th	Daniel Koster, Walter East & Dick Nallin	The Girard Sailors moved to Butler on May 9 Butler moved to become the Erie Sailors on June 15
