= Alliance-Sebring Twins =

- 1912; Alliance, Ohio Sebring, Ohio

Minor league affiliations
- Previous classes: Class D
- League: Ohio–Pennsylvania League

The Alliance-Sebring Twins was a short-lived minor league baseball club representing Sebring and Alliance, Ohio, in the Ohio–Pennsylvania League. The team played for just part of the league's 1912 season, disbanding on July 15, 1912.
