= East Liverpool Potters (baseball) =

- 1906–1912; East Liverpool, Ohio, Pittsburgh, Pennsylvania and New Martinsville, West Virginia

Minor league affiliations
- Previous classes: Class D
- League: Ohio–Pennsylvania League (1908–1912); Pennsylvania–Ohio–Maryland League (1906–1907)

Team data
- Previous names: New Martinsville (1912); Pittsburgh (1912); East Liverpool Potters (1906–1912)

The East Liverpool Potters were a minor league baseball club, located in East Liverpool, Ohio, from 1906 until 1912. The team first played its first two seasons in the Pennsylvania–Ohio–Maryland League, before moving to the Ohio–Pennsylvania League in 1908. The team first disbanded on August 20, 1911, however a new Potters team took the field the following season.

However the 1912 season proved to be the last for the Potters. The team moved to Pittsburgh, Pennsylvania on August 14, 1912 to become Pittsburgh in the team listings. The team's time in Pittsburgh was also brief. Just four days later, on August 18, 1912, the team relocated to New Martinsville, West Virginia, to become New Martinsville in the team listings. The club then folded at the end of the season.

== Year-by-year record ==
Year	Record	Finish	Manager	Notes
1906	53-45	4th	Joe Wall, Allen Kilheffer, Perry Verga & Percy Stetler	
1907	62-45	4th	C.C. Bippus & Tom Fleming	
1908	70-42	2nd	Bill Phillips	
1909	80-45	2nd	Archie Osborne & John Raley	
1910	63-61	T3rd	Guy Sample & Henry Lattimore	
1911	63-49	NA	Alexander Sweeney	Team disbanded on August 20
1912	49-57	3rd	Tony Crane & Charles Donnelly	Team moved to Pittsburgh on August 14. Team moved to New Martinsville on August 18.
