= Ohio–Pennsylvania League =

- Classification: Class C (1905–1911); Class D (1912)
- Sport: Minor League Baseball
- Founder: Charles H. Morton
- First season: 1905
- Folded: 1912
- President: Charles H. Morton (1905–1908); Samuel Wright (1909–1910); George L. Moreland (1910–1911); G.Y. Travis (1912)
- No. of teams: 54
- Country: United States
- Most titles: 4 Akron Champs (1908–1911)

The Ohio–Pennsylvania League (1905–1912) was a Class C and Class D level minor league baseball league that featured franchises based in Ohio, Pennsylvania, and West Virginia. The league was founded by Charlie Morton and operated for eight seasons, with the Akron Champs winning four league championships.

== History ==
The Ohio–Pennsylvania League had its beginnings in March 1905, when league president Charlie Morton invited six prospective members to a meeting in Akron, Ohio. In May 1905, eleven teams joined the Protective Association of Independent Clubs, which formed the basis of the Class C Division Ohio–Pennsylvania League. Ultimately, the league trimmed down to eight teams from the following cities: Akron, Newark, Niles, Youngstown, and Zanesville in Ohio, and Homestead, Lancaster, and Sharon in Pennsylvania.

That September, the Youngstown Ohio Works won the league championship, although sources disagree on the team's final record. As one researcher writes: "The Reach Guide (1906) credits Youngstown with an 84–32 won-lost record where the Spalding Guide of the same year lists a 90–35 record. The Encyclopedia of Minor League Baseball (1993) tells a third story, giving Youngstown an 88–35 mark."

In 1912, the league rescinded its membership in the National Association when it placed a franchise in Pittsburgh, Pennsylvania.

By the end of its seven-year lifespan, in 1912, the Ohio–Pennsylvania League had enlisted the membership of no less than 40 ball clubs based in over 20 cities. While the league was disorganized (like many of its counterparts), it provided regional sports teams with an alternative to the established minor-league system. Baseball luminaries who were once connected to the league include Billy Evans, Lee Fohl, Bill Phyle, and Everett Scott. Future Hall-of-Fame infielder George Sisler signed his first professional contract with an Akron club associated with the O-P League, although he never actually played for the team.

== Cities represented ==
- Akron, OH: Akron Buckeyes 1905; Akron Rubbernecks 1906; Akron Champs 1907–1911
- Alliance, OH & Sebring, OH: Alliance-Sebring Twins 1912
- Barberton, OH: Barberton Magic Cities 1905
- Braddock, PA: Braddock Infants 1905
- Bridgeport, OH: Bridgeport Giants 1912
- Bucyrus, OH: Bucyrus Bucks 1905
- Butler, PA: Butler Bucks 1905; Butler 1908
- Canton, OH: Canton Protectives 1905 Canton Watchmakers 1908–1909; Canton Deubers 1910–1911
- Connellsville, PA: Connellsville Cokers 1912
- East Liverpool, OH: East Liverpool Potters 1908–1912
- Erie, PA: Erie Sailors 1908–1911
- Fairmont, WV: Fairmont Fairies 1912
- Girard, OH: Girard Sailors 1908
- Homestead, PA: Homestead Steel Workers 1905
- Kent, OH: Kent Kings 1905
- Lancaster, OH: Lancaster Lanks 1905–1907
- Lima, OH: Lima Lees 1905
- Mansfield, OH: Mansfield Giants 1906; Mansfield Pioneers 1907; Mansfield Reformers 1910; Mansfield Brownies 1911
- Marion, OH: Marion Moguls 1906; Marion Drummers 1907
- Massillon, OH: Massillon Farmers 1905
- McKeesport, PA: McKeesport Colts 1905; McKeesport Tubers 1908–1910; McKeesport Tubers 1912
- Mount Vernon, OH: Mount Vernon Clippers 1905
- New Castle, PA: New Castle Outlaws 1906; New Castle Nocks 1907–1912
- New Martinsville, WV:New Martinsville 1912
- Newark, OH: Newark Idlewilds 1905; Newark Cotton Tops 1906; Newark Newks 1907
- Niles, OH: Niles Crowites 1905
- Pittsburgh, PA: Pittsburgh 1912
- Salem, OH: Salem Quakers 1912
- Sharon, PA: Sharon Steels 1905–1906; Sharon Giants 1907–1908, 1912; Sharon Travelers 1911
- Steubenville, OH: Steubenville Factory Men 1905; Steubenville Stubs 1909, 1911
- Steubenville, OH & Follansbee, WV: Steubenville-Follansbee Stubs 1912
- Washington, PA: Washington Patriots 1905
- Wooster, OH: Wooster Trailers 1905
- Youngstown, OH: Youngstown Ohio Works 1905–1906; Youngstown Champs 1907–1908; Youngstown Indians 1909; Youngstown Steelmen 1910–1911
- Zanesville, OH: Zanesville Moguls 1905–1906

== League champions ==
- Youngstown Ohio Works (1905)
- Youngstown Ohio Works (1906)
- Youngstown Champs (1907)
- Akron Champs (1908)
- Akron Champs (1909)
- Akron Champs (1910)
- Akron Champs (1911)
- Salem Quakers & Fairmont Fairies (1912)

== Standings and statistics ==
=== 1905 to 1908 ===
1905 Ohio–Pennsylvania League

Team standings	W	L	PCT	GB	Managers
Youngstown Ohio Works	88	35	.715	–	Marty Hogan
Akron Buckeyes	66	42	.611	14½	Frank Motz / Walter East
Zanesville Moguls	51	36	.586	NA	Fred Drumm
Niles Crowites	52	37	.584	NA	Charles Crowe
Braddock Infants	23	22	.511	NA	Don McKim
Lancaster Lanks	36	37	.493	NA	Fred Killen
Homestead Steel Workers	29	32	.475	NA	Howard Fisher
Newark Idlewilds	37	46	.446	NA	Jack Doyle
Sharon Steels	29	39	.426	NA	Frank Killen
McKeesport Colts	20	27	.426	NA	Ed Crawford / Frank Motz
Mount Vernon Clippers	16	24	.400	NA	Bill Goodrich
Massillon Farmers	26	41	.388	NA	Walter Lipps
Canton Protectives	19	40	.322	NA	William Delaney
Washington Patriots	3	3	.500	NA	Dan Kline
Lima Lees	2	6	.333	NA	Eddie Bailey
Bucyrus Bucks	5	12	.294	NA	NA
Butler Bucks	1	7	.125	NA	Ward Buckminister
Steubenville Factory Men	1	7	.125	NA	Jack Kelley
Wooster Trailers	0	2	.000	NA	Jess Bowers
Barberton Magic Cities	0	3	.000	NA	Bill Feignley
Kent Kings	0	6	.000	NA	Henry Metz

League was admitted to the National Association July 21
Canton withdrew July 10; Kent withdrew July 31; Butler withdrew Aug 2; Steubenville withdrew Aug 2; Mt. Vernon withdrew Aug 12; Massillon withdrew Aug 24.

1906 Ohio–Pennsylvania League
schedule

Team standings	W	L	PCT	GB	Managers
Youngstown Ohio Works	84	53	.613	–	Marty Hogan
Akron Rubbernecks	83	55	.601	1½	Walter East
Lancaster Lanks	73	66	.525	12	Frederick Gray / Curt Elston
New Castle Outlaws	73	67	.521	12½	Percy Stetler / Ralph Lindaman; William Smith
Zanesville Moguls / Marion Moguls	71	69	.507	14½	Ferdinand Drumm
Newark Cotton Tops	65	74	.468	20	Gene Bates / Bill Bottenus / Pete Sommers / Walter Snodgrass
Mansfield Giants	59	77	.434	24½	Carl McVey
Sharon Steels	46	93	.331	39	Frank Yoho / Charles Crowe; Dick Glassburner

Zanesville (58–55) moved to Marion August 28.
No playoffs were scheduled.

Player statistics
Player	Team	Stat	Tot	Player	Team	Stat	Tot
Bill Thomas	Youngstown	BA	.303	Fred Ehman	Akron	W	29
Fred Abbott	Lancaster	Runs	83	Fred Ehman	Akron	PCT	.707 29–12
Bill Thomas	Youngstown	Hits	158				

1907 Ohio–Pennsylvania League
schedule

Team standings	W	L	PCT	GB	Managers
Youngstown Champs	86	52	.623	–	Sam Wright
Newark Newks	86	53	.619	½	Bob Berryhill
Akron Champs	83	53	.610	2	Walter East
Lancaster Lanks	72	62	.537	12	James Breen / Curt Elston; Frank Locke
New Castle Nocks	64	74	.464	22	Bill Smith
Mansfield Pioneers	55	84	.396	31½	Carl McVey
Sharon Giants	55	84	.396	31½	Rudy Kling / Van Patterson
Marion Drummers	48	87	.356	36½	Ferdinand Drumm / Robert Quinn; Thomas Mylett

No playoffs were scheduled.

Player statistics
Player	Team	Stat	Tot	Player	Team	Stat	Tot
Curt Elston	Lancaster	BA	.318	Buck Thomas	Youngstown	W	28
Charlie Starr	Youngstown	Runs	75	Ed Asher	Newark	PCT	.714 25–10
Delos Drake	Marion	Hits	164				

1908 Ohio–Pennsylvania League
schedule

Team standings	W	L	PCT	GB	Managers
Akron Champs	81	36	.692	–	John Breckinridge
East Liverpool Potters	70	42	.625	8½	Bill Phillips
Canton Watchmakers	65	54	.546	17	Ed Murphy / Thomas Lindsay
Sharon Giants	62	56	.525	19½	Van Patterson
Youngstown Champs	58	60	.492	23½	Sam Wright
New Castle Nocks	47	70	.402	34	Pete Porter / R. Hagan
McKeesport Tubers	44	72	.379	36½	Bernie McCay / Pat Eastley
Girard Sailors / Butler / Erie Sailors	42	79	.347	41	Daniel Koster / Walter East; Dick Nallin

Girard (0–9) moved to Butler May 9; Butler (5–17) moved to Erie June 15.
The season shortened to September 7.
No playoffs were scheduled.

Player statistics
Player	Team	Stat	Tot	Player	Team	Stat	Tot
Wilbur Good	Akron	BA	.370	Fred Ehman	Akron	W	25
Teddy Hinton	Youngstown	Runs	82	Bill Phillips	East Liverpool	PCT	.818 18–4
Jack McAleese	Youngstown	Hits	150				
Harry Bailey	Canton	HR	8				

=== 1909 to 1912 ===
1909 Ohio–Pennsylvania League
schedule

Team standings	W	L	PCT	GB	Managers
Akron Champs	81	40	.670	–	Jim Breckinridge / Bill Schwartz
East Liverpool Potters	80	45	.640	3	Arch Osborne / John Raley
McKeesport Tubers	73	53	.579	10½	Bill Thomas
New Castle Nocks	59	65	.476	23½	Jim Barton / Ferdinand Drumm
Canton Watchmakers	55	67	.451	26½	Van Patterson
Erie Sailors	48	69	.410	31	Milt Montgomery / Red Davis; Matt Broderick
Steubenville Stubs	48	73	.397	33	John Hanlon / Jim Lynch; Frank Blair
Youngstown Indians	46	78	.371	36½	Charles Crowe / William Terry

No playoffs were scheduled.

Player statistics
Player	Team	Stat	Tot	Player	Team	Stat	Tot
Burt Shotton	Steubenville	BA	.347	Harry Camnitz	McKeesport	W	27
Gene Elliott	McKeesport	Runs	75	Arch Osborne	East Liverpool	PCT	.760 19–6
Burt Shotton	Steubenville	Hits	154				

1910 Ohio–Pennsylvania League
schedule

Team standings	W	L	PCT	GB	Managers
Akron Champs	73	53	.579	–	Lee Fohl
Canton Deubers	72	54	.571	1	Ferdinand Drumm
East Liverpool Potters	63	61	.508	9	Guy Sample / Henry Lattimore
McKeesport Tubers	64	62	.508	9	Duke Servatius / Edward Connors
Mansfield Reformers	60	66	.476	13	Paddy Fox
New Castle Nocks	57	67	.460	15	Frank Blair / Jim Barton
Youngstown Steelmen	55	67	.451	16	Frank Eustace
Erie Sailors	55	69	.444	17	Matt Broderick

No playoffs were scheduled.

Player statistics
Player	Team	Stat	Tot	Player	Team	Stat	Tot
Frank Warrender	East Liverpool	BA	.341	Fred Wilhelm	Canton	W	23
Fred Dawson	Canton	Runs	95	Fred Wilhelm	Canton	SO	284
Fred Corbin	Akron	Hits	150	Fred Wilhelm	Canton	PCT	.767 23–7
Duke Servatius	McKeesport	HR	16				

1911 Ohio–Pennsylvania League
schedule

Team standings	W	L	PCT	GB	Managers
Akron Champs	90	42	.682	–	Jack McCallister / Lee Fohl
Youngstown Steelmen	82	50	.621	8	Bill Phillips / W.R. Terry
Erie Sailors	77	54	.588	12½	Billy Gilbert
Canton Deubers	75	59	.560	16	Ferdinand Drumm
Mansfield Brownies	55	82	.401	37½	Ed Hahn / Les Channell; Frank Reynolds
New Castle Nocks / Sharon Travelers	35	101	.257	57	Joe Sugden / Steve Griffin / Bill Thomas / Peter Porter
East Liverpool Potters	63	49	.563	NA	Alexander Sweeney
Steubenville Stubs	40	80	.333	NA	John Castle

New Castle (25–85) moved to Sharon August 12; East Liverpool and Steubenville folded August 20.
No playoffs were scheduled.

Player statistics
Player	Team	Stat	Tot	Player	Team	Stat	Tot
Joe Wilson	East Liverpool	BA	.365	Elmer Brown	Akron	W	22
Ezra Midkiff	Akron	Runs	96	Ralph McConnaughey	Erie	W	22
Ray Miller	Akron	Hits	162	Earl Moseley	Youngstown	So	242
Hughie Tate	Youngstown	HR	23	Elmer Brown	Akron	PCT	.815 22–5

1912 Ohio–Pennsylvania League
schedule

Team standings	W	L	PCT	GB	Managers
Salem Quakers / Fairmont Fairies	64	44	.593	–	Hugh Shannon / Jim Buchanan
Steubenville-Follansbee Stubs	62	50	.554	4	Gene Curtis
Liverpool Potters / Pittsburgh / New Martinsville	49	57	.462	14	Tony Crane / Charles Donnelly
Sharon Giants / Bridgeport Giants	47	59	.443	16	Charles Eichenberger / R.M. Paige; Ralph Rainson
McKeesport Tubers	39	22	.639	NA	Hack Adler / Matthew McGrath; Monte Pfeiffer
Alliance-Sebring Twins	26	33	.441	NA	Larry Maley
Connellsville Cokers	12	21	.364	NA	W.C. Wilson / Earle Mack
New Castle Nocks	9	22	.290	NA	Charles Smith / Jack Murray

Connelsville and New Castle folded June 18; Salem moved to Fairmont July 9; Alliance-Sebring folded July 15 after player strike; McKeesport folded July 17; Sharon moved to Bridgeport August 10; East Liverpool moved to Pittsburgh (2–0) August 14; Pittsburgh moved to New Martinsville August 18.
League rescinded its membership to the National Association August 13 after it placed a franchise in Pittsburgh.
Playoff: Fairmont declared champion when Steubenville-Follansbee folded before the playoff.

Player statistics
Player	Team	Stat	Tot	Player	Team	Stat	Tot
Baby Foster	Connellsville / Alliance / Steubenville-Follansbee	BA	.377	Ed Sisley	Steubenville-Follansbee	W	20
William Carroll	Salem/Fairmont	Runs	68	Ed Sisley	Steubenville	SO	217
Harry Edwards	Salem/Fairmont	Hits	127	Eddie Bauer	McKeesport	Pct	.789; 15-4
Charles Donnelly	East Liverpool	HR	7				
Jim McKelvey	Steubenville-Follansbee / Bridgeport	SB	40				

== Related links ==
- Ballpark Watch
- Baseball Reference
- Ohio–Pennsylvania League history
