= Braddock Infants =

- 1905–1907; Braddock, Pennsylvania

Minor league affiliations
- Previous classes: Class C (1905); Class D (1906–1907)
- Previous leagues: Ohio-Pennsylvania League (1905); Pennsylvania-Ohio-Maryland League (1906–1907)

The Braddock Infants were a minor league baseball team that played from 1905 to 1907. Based in Braddock, Pennsylvania, the club was a member of the Ohio–Pennsylvania League in 1905 and the Pennsylvania–Ohio–Maryland League from 1906 to 1907. It is the only known professional baseball team to be based in Braddock.

The team produced several future major league players such as Ody Abbott, Andy Bruckmiller, Fred Hartman, Alex Jones, Harvey Cushman, Cal Vasbinder and Lee Viau.

== Year-by-year record ==
Year	Record	Finish	Manager	Playoffs
1905	23–22	NA	Donald McKim	No playoffs held
1906	55–43	3rd	Donald McKim and M. M. Edmundson	No Playoffs held
1907	37–71	8th	Donald McKim and Thomas Cosgrove	No playoffs held
