= Wooster Trailers =

Former minor league baseball team

The Wooster Trailers were an Ohio–Pennsylvania League minor league baseball team that played in 1905. The club, based in Wooster, Ohio, was managed by Jess Bowers. It is the only known professional baseball team to be based in Wooster. The team earned the nickname "Trailers" after it lost the first two games of the season, hence it was trailing in the standings.
