= Steubenville Stubs =

- 1887–1913; (1887, 1895, 1905–1907, 1909, 1911–1913); Steubenville, Ohio

Minor league affiliations
- Previous classes: Class B (1913); Class D (1912); Class C (1909, 1911); Class D (1906–1907); Class C (1905)
- League: Interstate League (1913)
- Previous leagues: Ohio–Pennsylvania League (1909, 1911–1912); Penn.-Ohio-Maryland (1906–1907); Ohio–Pennsylvania League (1905); Interstate League (1895); Ohio State League (1887)

Minor league titles
- League titles: 1 (1907)

Team data
- Previous names: Steubenville Stubs (1913); Steubenville-Follansbee Stubs (1912); Steubenville Stubs (1906–1907, 1909, 1911); Steubenville Factory Men (1905); Steubenville Stubs (1887, 1895)

The Steubenville Stubs was the predominant name of a minor league baseball team that sparsely played in Steubenville, Ohio between 1887 and 1913. The team was first formed in 1887 as a member of the Ohio State League, before disbanding on June 29 of that year. A second Stubs team played in 1895 as a member of the Interstate League, however that team also proved to be short-lived. The club moved to Akron, Ohio on May 13, 1895 to become the Akron Akrons and then to Lima, Ohio on May 19, 1895 to become the Lima Farmers.

The third incarnation of the Stubs began in 1905 as the city fielded a team for the Ohio–Pennsylvania League, named the Steubenville Factory Men. A year later the club moved to the Pennsylvania–Ohio–Maryland League and took up the Stubs moniker. In 1907 the Stubs ended the season with a 69-33 for the league title. After skipping the 1908 season, the Stubs returned for the 1909 and 1911 seasons. The team disbanded on August 20, 1911. In 1912 the Stubs moved to Follansbee, West Virginia for the second half of the 1912 Ohio–Pennsylvania League season, as the Steubenville-Follansbee Stubs. The club went 14–15 to fourth of four teams in a tight race in the second half, before the league folded on August 6, 1912. The Fairmont Fairies were declared the league champion when the Stubs were unable to field a team for the playoffs.

A final Stubs team played in the Interstate League in 1913, before disbanding for the final time.

== Year-by-year record ==
Year	Record	Finish	Manager	Playoffs
1887	9-34	--	Tom Nicholson, Joseph Woods & James Quinn	Team disbanded June 29
1895	21-39	6th	George Moreland, George Rhue & Timothy Donovan	Relocated to Akron
1905	1-7	--	Jack Kelly	
1906	48-51	5th	John Smith & Eddie Lee	
1907	69-33	1st	Percy Stetler	League Champs
1909	48-73	7th	Doc Martel, Jim Lynch & Frank Blair	
1911	40-80	--	John Castle	Team disbanded August 20
1912	62-50	2nd	Gene Curtis	unable to field a team for the playoffs
1913	31-42	5th	Roy Montgomery	
