= Connellsville Cokers (baseball) =

- 1907–1914; (1907–1909, 1912, 1914); Connellsville, Pennsylvania

Minor league affiliations
- Previous classes: Class D
- League: Pennsylvania–West Virginia League (1914)
- Previous leagues: Ohio–Pennsylvania League (1912); Pennsylvania–West Virginia League (1908–1909); Western Pennsylvania League (1907)

Team data
- Previous names: Connellsville (1914); Connellsville Cokers (1907–1909, 1912)

The Connellsville Cokers, based in Connellsville, Pennsylvania, USA, were a professional minor league baseball team that played in the Western Pennsylvania League in 1907, the Pennsylvania–West Virginia League in 1908 and 1909 and the Ohio–Pennsylvania League in 1912. An un-nicknamed Connellsville team then played in the PWVL in 1914. They were the first professional baseball team to be based in Connellsville.

Notable players include major leaguers Roy Ellam, Hy Myers and Huck Wallace.
