= Washington Patriots =

The Washington Patriots were an Ohio–Pennsylvania League minor league baseball team that played in 1905. The C-level club was based in Washington, Pennsylvania and was the first known professional team to come out of that city. The team was managed by Dan Kline.
