= M. M. Edmundson =

American lawyer (1873–1952)

Biographical details
- Born: April 6, 1873; Butler County, Pennsylvania, U.S.
- Died: September 28, 1952 (aged 79); West Mifflin, Pennsylvania, U.S.
- Education: Westminster (PA) (1901)

Playing career

Football
- c. 1899: Westminster (PA)

Baseball
- 1902: Hartford Senators
- 1904: Montreal Royals
- 1905–1907: Braddock Infants

Coaching career (HC unless noted)

Football
- 1902–1903: Westminster (PA)

Baseball
- 1906: Braddock Infants
- 1915: Pittsburgh

Head coaching record
- Overall: 3–4–4 (college football)

Marion Martin "Eddie" Edmundson (April 6, 1873 – September 28, 1952), also known as Mays Edmundson, was an American football and baseball coach, minor league baseball player and manager, and lawyer. He served as the head football coach at Westminster College in New Wilmington, Pennsylvania in 1902. Edmundson was also the head baseball coach at the University of Pittsburgh in 1915.

A native of Butler, Pennsylvania, Edmundson was born to Levi H. and Mary M. Edmundson. He was a graduate of Westminster College and the University of Pittsburgh School of Law. Edmundson practiced law in McKeesport, Pennsylvania. He died on September 28, 1952, at his home in West Mifflin, Pennsylvania.

== Head coaching record ==
=== College football ===
Year	Team	Overall	Conference	Standing	Bowl/playoffs
Westminster Titans (Independent) (1902)
1902	Westminster	3–4–4			
Westminster:		3–4–4			
Total:		3–4–4			
