= New Castle Nocks =

The New Castle Nocks were an Ohio–Pennsylvania League minor league baseball team that played from 1907 to 1912. The team was based in New Castle, Pennsylvania. Its nickname was a shortened version of Neshannock.

== Major league alumni ==
The following are the team's known major league alumni.

- 1907: Harry Camnitz, Al Schweitzer, Bill Steen
- 1908: Ody Abbott, Camnitz, Jim Miller, Doc Ralston, George Stutz
- 1909: Abbott, Ned Crompton
- 1910: Abbott, Roy Golden
- 1911: Zip Collins, Arthur Hauger, Ed Hilley, Joe Houser, Al Humphrey, Frank Lobert, Joe Sugden (player/manager)
- 1912: Charlie Smith (manager)
