= Kent Kings (baseball) =

The Kent Kings were an Ohio–Pennsylvania League minor league baseball team that played in 1905. The club is the only known professional team to have been based in Kent, Ohio. Henry Metz managed the team.
