= Bucyrus Bucks =

The Bucyrus Bucks were a short-lived minor league baseball team that played in the Ohio–Pennsylvania League in 1905. The club is the only known professional team to ever be based in Bucyrus, Ohio.
