= Bill Irwin (baseball) =

American baseball player (1859–1933)

- Pitcher
- Born: September 16, 1859; Neville, Ohio, U.S.
- Died: August 7, 1933 (aged 73); Fort Thomas, Kentucky, U.S.
- Batted: Right Threw: Right

MLB debut
- August 30, 1886, for the Cincinnati Red Stockings

Last MLB appearance
- October 7, 1886, for the Cincinnati Red Stockings

MLB statistics
- Win–loss record: 0–2
- Earned run average: 5.82
- Strikeouts: 6
- Stats at Baseball Reference

Teams
- Cincinnati Red Stockings (1886)

William Franklin Irwin (September 16, 1859 – August 7, 1933) was an American professional baseball player for the Cincinnati Red Stockings in 1886. He batted right and threw right-handed. He was born in Neville, Ohio and died in Fort Thomas, Kentucky.
