= Youngstown Steelmen =

The Youngstown Steelmen was a minor league baseball franchise that competed in three different leagues between 1910 and 1915. The club, based in Youngstown, Ohio, participated at various times in the Ohio–Pennsylvania League, the Tri-State League, and the Central League. The Steelmen's most notable alumnus was Everett Scott, who played with the club between 1910 and 1913. Scott later served as a shortstop for the Boston Red Sox and New York Yankees.

== Origins ==
The Steelmen succeeded the Youngstown Indians, a team that placed last in the Ohio–Pennsylvania League at the close of the 1909 season. The renamed franchise was owned by former Indians coach W. R. Terry and business partner Paul Powers. In the 1910 season, the Steelmen, under the management of Frank Eustace, placed seventh in the eight-team league, with a record of 55–67.

== Playing record ==
The club's performance improved dramatically during the following season. In 1911, under manager Bill Phillips, the Steelmen placed second in the league, with a record of 82–50. The championship was taken that year by the Akron Champs, which closed with a record of 90–42.

The Steelmen moved to the Central League in the 1912 season, where it narrowly lost the championship to the Fort Wayne Railroaders. Although the Steelmen ended the season with a 74–54 record, the Railroaders closed with 77 wins and 52 losses. The Spalding Guide (1913) observed that the Steelmen "gave Fort Wayne a terrific drive for the championship and for much of the season the pennant looked as if it would be won by the Ohio club".

The Steelmen moved to the Tri-State League in 1913, but returned to the Central League in 1915.
