= John Castle (baseball) =

American baseball player (1879-1929)

- Outfielder
- Born: June 1, 1879; Honey Brook, Pennsylvania, U.S.
- Died: April 13, 1929 (aged 49); Philadelphia, Pennsylvania, U.S.
- Batted: Unknown Threw: Unknown

MLB debut
- April 25, 1910, for the Philadelphia Phillies

Last MLB appearance
- May 10, 1910, for the Philadelphia Phillies

MLB statistics
- Games played: 3
- At bats: 4
- Hits: 1
- Stats at Baseball Reference

Teams
- Philadelphia Phillies (1910)

John Francis Castle (June 1, 1879 – April 13, 1929) was an American outfielder in Major League Baseball. He played three games for the Philadelphia Phillies in 1910.

After his appearance in Major League Baseball, he was a player-manager in the minor leagues for nine seasons beginning in 1911 with the Steubenville Stubs in Steubenville, Ohio. In 1912, he moved to the Lancaster Lanks in Lancaster, Ohio. On June 18, 1912, the team moved to Atlantic City, New Jersey to represent Atlantic City in the Tri-State League. Castle continued there in 1913, after which the team disbanded. In 1914, he was player-manager in Allentown, Pennsylvania. From 1915 to 1916, he was with the Quincy Gems in Quincy, Illinois. In 1917, he moved to the Hannibal Mules in Hannibal, Missouri. In 1919, he was with the Rockford Rox in Rockford, Illinois. His minor league career ended in 1920 with the Wilson Bugs in Wilson, North Carolina.

In 1928, he was head coach of the Saint Joseph's Hawks baseball team.
