= Joseph A. McDonald =

Joseph A. McDonald (December 6, 1866 – July 15, 1930) was a significant figure in the development of the Northeastern U.S. steel industry. As superintendent of the Ohio Works of the Carnegie Steel Company, in Youngstown, Ohio, McDonald oversaw construction of one of the largest steel-production plants in the country.

== Early years ==
McDonald was born in Braddock, Pennsylvania, to Patrick and Christiana McDonald. He became involved in the steel industry at an early age and rose quickly to positions of responsibility. After completing an apprenticeship in the Pittsburgh area, McDonald went on to gain further experience in Bellaire, Ohio.

== Industrial management career ==
McDonald relocated from Bellaire to Youngstown, Ohio, in 1893, shortly after the opening of the Ohio Steel Company plant in that city. He initially worked as night foreman of the Bessemer plant but later rose to the position of department superintendent. He was promoted to the position of assistant superintendent when the Ohio Works became a steel corporation subsidiary.

When his brother, Thomas G. McDonald, became general manager of the Youngstown district of the Carnegie Steel Company, Joseph McDonald was elevated to the position of superintendent of the Ohio Works. During his tenure as superintendent, McDonald worked closely with Pittsburgh engineer B.R. Shover when he designed the Ohio Works' mammoth steel-production facilities.

Meanwhile, McDonald oversaw the development of recreational facilities, athletic playing fields, and organized sports for Ohio Works employees. Along with his brother, Thomas, he co-founded a minor league baseball team, the Youngstown Ohio Works, which won the premier championship of the Ohio–Pennsylvania League in 1905 and took the league pennant again in 1906. McDonald also sponsored the Youngstown Champs, which replaced the Ohio Works team and won the league championship in 1907.

== Later years ==
In 1912, McDonald became superintendent of the Cambria Steel Company, in Johnstown, Pennsylvania. He was later associated with the Jones & Laughlin Corporation. During World War I, he became involved with the Federal War Industries Board.

He died in Pittsburgh, Pennsylvania, on July 15, 1930 of complications from Baker's Cyst, just three days after the death of his elder brother, Thomas McDonald, in Youngstown. Funeral services were held at the Orr Funeral Home, and McDonald's remains were interred at Oak Hill Cemetery, in Youngstown. In a eulogy prepared by Dr. W. E. Hammaker, pastor of Youngstown's Trinity Methodist Episcopal Church, McDonald was described as a "great industrialist, a civic reformer, and a true philosopher".
