= Pennsylvania–Ohio–Maryland League =

Baseball minor league

- Classification: Class D (1906–1907)
- Sport: Minor League Baseball
- First season: 1906
- Folded: 1907
- President: Richard R. Guy (1906–1907)
- No. of teams: 12
- Country: United States
- Most titles: 1 Uniontown Coal Barons (1906); Steubenville Stubs (1907)

The Pennsylvania–Ohio–Maryland League (abbreviated POM League) was a Class D baseball minor league which began in 1906. By 1908, however, this baseball minor league was extinct. Cumberland, Maryland dropped out after 1906, leaving Maryland unrepresented in 1907. West Virginia was in the loop for about three weeks when Butler moved to Piedmont, West Virginia, but the team moved on to Charleroi, Pennsylvania.

== Cities represented ==
- Braddock, Pennsylvania: Braddock Infants 1906–1907
- Butler, Pennsylvania: Butler Bucks 1906
- Charleroi, Pennsylvania: Charleroi 1906–1907
- Cumberland, Maryland: Cumberland Giants 1906
- East Liverpool, Ohio: East Liverpool 1906–1907
- McKeesport, Pennsylvania: McKeesport Tubers 1907
- Piedmont, West Virginia: Piedmont 1906
- Steubenville, Ohio: Steubenville Stubs 1906–1907
- Uniontown, Pennsylvania: Uniontown Coal Barons 1906–1907
- Washington, Pennsylvania: Washington 1906–1907
- Waynesburg, Pennsylvania: Waynesburg 1906
- Zanesville, Ohio: Zanesville 1907

== Standings & statistics ==
=== 1906 Pennsylvania–Ohio–Maryland League ===
schedule

Team standings	W	L	PCT	GB	Managers
Uniontown Coal Barons	56	42	.572	–	James Groninger
Washington	57	44	.564	½	Bill Seamon
Braddock Infants	55	43	.561	1	Don McKim
East Liverpool Potters	53	45	.541	3	Joe Wall / Allen Kilheffer; Perry Werga / Percy Stetler
Cumberland Giants	50	48	.510	6	Harry Irvine / Dan Raley
Waynesburg	48	50	.490	8	Phillips
Steubenville Stubs	48	51	.485	8½	John W. Smith / Eddie Lee
Butler / Piedmont / Charleroi	26	70	.271	29	Thomas Lindsay

Butler (16–16) moved to Piedmont July 14; Piedmont (1–20) Moved to Charleroi August 6.
No Playoffs Scheduled.

=== 1907 Pennsylvania–Ohio–Maryland League ===
schedule

Team standings	W	L	PCT	GB	Managers
Steubenville Stubs	69	33	.676	–	Percy Stetler
Uniontown Coal Barons	64	43	.598	7½	Alex Pearson
Zanesville	63	43	.594	8	Marty Hogan
East Liverpool Potters	62	45	.579	9½	C.C. Bippus / Tom Fleming
Washington	45	57	.441	24	William Seaman
Charleroi	45	63	.417	27	Tom Sloan / Wolf
McKeesport Tubers	38	68	.358	33	Jock Menefee
Braddock Infants	37	71	.343	35	Don McKim / Tom Cosgrove

No Playoffs Scheduled.

Player statistics
Player	Team	Stat	Tot
Pop Schriver	Zanesville	BA	.335
R. Hess Morgan	McKeesport	Hits	118
R. Hess Morgan	McKeesport	Runs	70
Harry E. Ball	East Liverpool	SB	54
