= Massillon Farmers =

The Massillon Farmers were an Ohio–Pennsylvania League minor league baseball team based in Massillon, Ohio that played in 1905. The team was managed by Walter Lipp.

It was the first professional team to be based in Massillon since 1898 and is the most recent squad to come from that city.
