= Frank Motz =

American baseball player (1869–1944)

- First baseman
- Born: October 1, 1869; Freeburg, Pennsylvania, U.S.
- Died: March 18, 1944 (aged 74); Akron, Ohio, U.S.
- Batted: unknown Threw: unknown

MLB debut
- August 27, 1890, for the Philadelphia Phillies

Last MLB appearance
- May 19, 1894, for the Cincinnati Reds

MLB statistics
- Batting average: .238
- Home runs: 2
- Runs batted in: 37
- Stats at Baseball Reference

Teams
- Philadelphia Phillies (1890); Cincinnati Reds (1893–1894)

Frank H. Motz (October 1, 1869 – March 18, 1944) was an American third baseman in Major League Baseball for the Philadelphia Phillies.
