= Scotty Ingerton =

American baseball player (1886–1956)

- Third baseman / Left fielder
- Born: April 19, 1886; Peninsula, Ohio, U.S.
- Died: June 15, 1956 (aged 70); Cleveland, Ohio, U.S.
- Batted: Right Threw: Right

MLB debut
- April 12, 1911, for the Boston Rustlers

Last MLB appearance
- October 9, 1911, for the Boston Rustlers

MLB statistics
- Batting average: .250
- Home runs: 5
- Runs batted in: 61
- Stats at Baseball Reference

Teams
- Boston Rustlers (1911)

William John "Scotty" Ingerton (April 19, 1886 – June 15, 1956) was an American Major League Baseball player. Ingerton played for Boston Rustlers in 1911 as third baseman and left fielder.

Ingerton was born in Peninsula, Ohio and died in Cleveland, Ohio.
