= Lew Groh =

American baseball player (1883-1960)

- Third baseman
- Born: October 16, 1883; Rochester, New York, U.S.
- Died: October 20, 1960 (aged 77); Rochester, New York, U.S.
- Batted: Right Threw: Right

MLB debut
- August 2, 1919, for the Philadelphia Athletics

Last MLB appearance
- August 8, 1919, for the Philadelphia Athletics

MLB statistics
- Batting average: .000
- Stats at Baseball Reference

Teams
- Philadelphia Athletics (1919)

Lewis Carl Groh (October 16, 1883 – October 20, 1960), nicknamed "Silver", was an American Major League Baseball (MLB) infielder. He played for the Philadelphia Athletics during the 1919 season. His brother, Heinie Groh, also played in the major leagues.
