= Charlie Morton (baseball manager) =

American baseball player, manager, and executive (1854–1921)

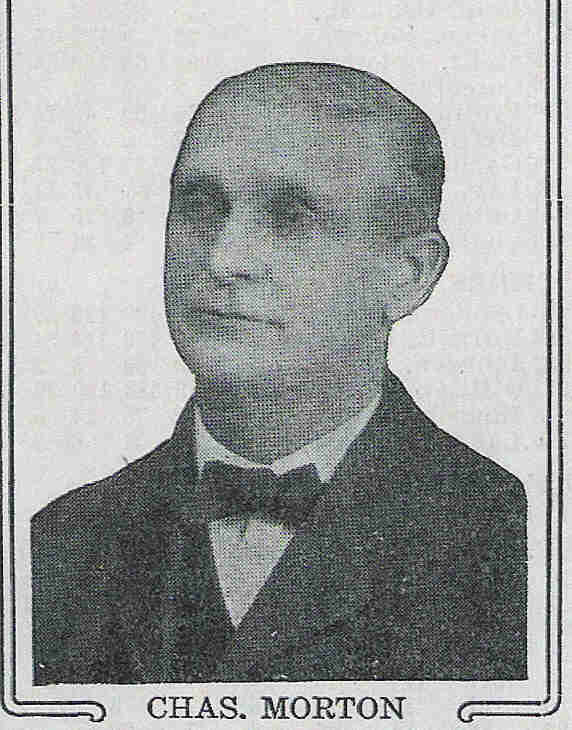
- Morton as President of Ohio-Penn League
- Outfielder / Manager / Executive
- Born: October 12, 1854; Kingsville, Ohio, U.S.
- Died: December 9, 1921 (aged 67); Massillon, Ohio, U.S.
- Batted: Right Threw: Right

MLB debut
- May 2, 1882, for the Pittsburgh Alleghenys

Last MLB appearance
- June 23, 1885, for the Detroit Wolverines

MLB statistics
- Games played: 88
- Runs scored: 34
- Batting average: .194
- Stats at Baseball Reference

Teams
- As player: Pittsburgh Alleghenys (1882); St. Louis Brown Stockings (1882); Toledo Blue Stockings (1884); Detroit Wolverines (1885); As manager: Toledo Blue Stockings (1884); Detroit Wolverines (1885); Toledo Maumees (1890)

Career highlights and awards
- President of the Ohio–Pennsylvania League, 1905–1912.; Player-manager for two seasons

Charles Hazen Morton (October 12, 1854 – December 9, 1921) was an American Major League Baseball outfielder, manager, and League executive. As a manager, he led a team whose members included the first African-American players in Major League history.

After retiring from the major leagues, Morton served intermittently as an official and went on to become an influential minor league baseball executive.

== Major league career ==
Morton played for, and managed in, the American Association, with the Toledo Blue Stockings in 1884 and the Detroit Wolverines in 1885. He played one season prior to managing, 1882, and managed the 1890 Toledo Maumees after his playing career was over. He compiled a career managerial record of 121 wins and 153 losses.

He was the manager for the 1884 Toledo Blue Stockings, who had transferred into the American Association from the Northwestern League after the 1883 season. It was this team that included Moses Fleetwood Walker and his brother Welday Walker, who are now considered the first African-American players to play in Major League Baseball. On August 10, 1883 before a scheduled exhibition game, Cap Anson and his Chicago White Stockings had told Morton that his team would not play on the same field as the Walker brothers. Even though he had initially given Walker the day off due to injuries, Morton then re-inserted Moses in the game. He did this to force Anson to either play or lose his portion of the gate receipts. Anson decided to play that day, but when Chicago came to town the following year, they had already signed an agreement that the Walker brothers would not play.

== Later years ==
After his playing career, Morton spent much of his time as an executive, most notably as the founder and president of the Ohio–Pennsylvania League during its existence from 1905 through 1912. By the end of its seven-year lifespan, the league had enlisted the membership of no less than 40 ball clubs based in over 20 cities. Morton also served as an official, umpiring a number of games during the 1886 season. He died in Massillon, Ohio at the age of 67, and was buried at Glendale Cemetery in Akron, Ohio.

== See also ==
- List of Major League Baseball player–managers

Preceded by Jack Chapman	Detroit Wolverines Managers; 1885	Succeeded by Bill Watkins
