= Dutch Rudolph =

American baseball player (1882–1967)

- Outfielder
- Born: July 10, 1882; Natrona, Pennsylvania, U.S.
- Died: April 17, 1967 (aged 84); Natrona, Pennsylvania, U.S.
- Batted: Left Threw: Left

MLB debut
- July 3, 1903, for the Philadelphia Phillies

Last MLB appearance
- July 17, 1904, for the Chicago Cubs

MLB statistics
- Batting average: .250
- Home runs: 0
- Runs batted in: 0
- Stats at Baseball Reference

Teams
- Philadelphia Phillies (1903); Chicago Cubs (1904)

John Herman "Dutch" Rudolph (July 10, 1882 – April 17, 1967) was an American outfielder in Major League Baseball. He played for the Philadelphia Phillies and Chicago Cubs.
