= Frank Killen =

American baseball player (1870–1939)

- Pitcher
- Born: November 30, 1870; Pittsburgh, Pennsylvania, U.S.
- Died: December 3, 1939 (aged 69); Pittsburgh, Pennsylvania, U.S.
- Batted: Left Threw: Left

MLB debut
- August 27, 1891, for the Milwaukee Brewers

Last MLB appearance
- June 27, 1900, for the Chicago Orphans

MLB statistics
- Win–loss record: 164–131
- Earned run average: 3.78
- Strikeouts: 725
- Stats at Baseball Reference

Teams
- Milwaukee Brewers (1891); Washington Senators (NL) (1892); Pittsburgh Pirates (1893–1898); Washington Senators (NL) (1898–1899); Boston Beaneaters (1899); Chicago Orphans (1900)

Career highlights and awards
- 2× NL wins leader (1893, 1896)

Frank Bissell "Lefty" Killen (November 30, 1870 – December 3, 1939) was an American professional baseball player. He was a left-handed pitcher over parts of ten seasons (1891–1900) with the Milwaukee Brewers, Washington Senators (NL), Pittsburgh Pirates, Boston Beaneaters and Chicago Orphans.

He was born and later died in Pittsburgh, Pennsylvania, at the age of 69.

== Career ==
In 1893, Killen posted a league-best 36 victories against fourteen defeats. No left-hander in National League history has won as many games since then. He was the National League wins leader in 1893 and 1896 with Pittsburgh, leading the league in complete games and shutouts in 1896.

For his career, he compiled a 164–131 record in 321 appearances, with a 3.78 ERA and 725 strikeouts.

As a hitter, Kileen posted a career .241 batting average (241-for-998) with eleven home runs, 127 RBI, 151 runs scored and drew 131 bases on balls.

== See also ==
- List of Major League Baseball annual wins leaders
