= Hughie Tate =

American baseball player (1880–1956)

- Outfielder
- Born: May 19, 1880; Everett, Pennsylvania, U.S.
- Died: August 7, 1956 (aged 76); Greenville, Pennsylvania, U.S.
- Batted: Right Threw: Right

MLB debut
- September 21, 1905, for the Washington Senators

Last MLB appearance
- September 25, 1905, for the Washington Senators

MLB statistics
- Batting average: .308
- Home runs: 0
- Runs batted in: 2
- Stats at Baseball Reference

Teams
- Washington Senators (1905)

Hugh Henry Tate (May 19, 1880 – August 7, 1956) was an American Major League Baseball outfielder. He attended the University of Pennsylvania.

== Sources ==
- Career statistics from Baseball Reference · Baseball Reference (Minors) · Retrosheet · Baseball Almanac
