= September 1912 =

Month of 1912

<<	September 1912					>>
Su	Mo	Tu	We	Th	Fr	Sa
1	2	3	4	5	6	7
8	9	10	11	12	13	14
15	16	17	18	19	20	21
22	23	24	25	26	27	28
29	30

September 28, 1912: Thousands sign the Ulster Covenant

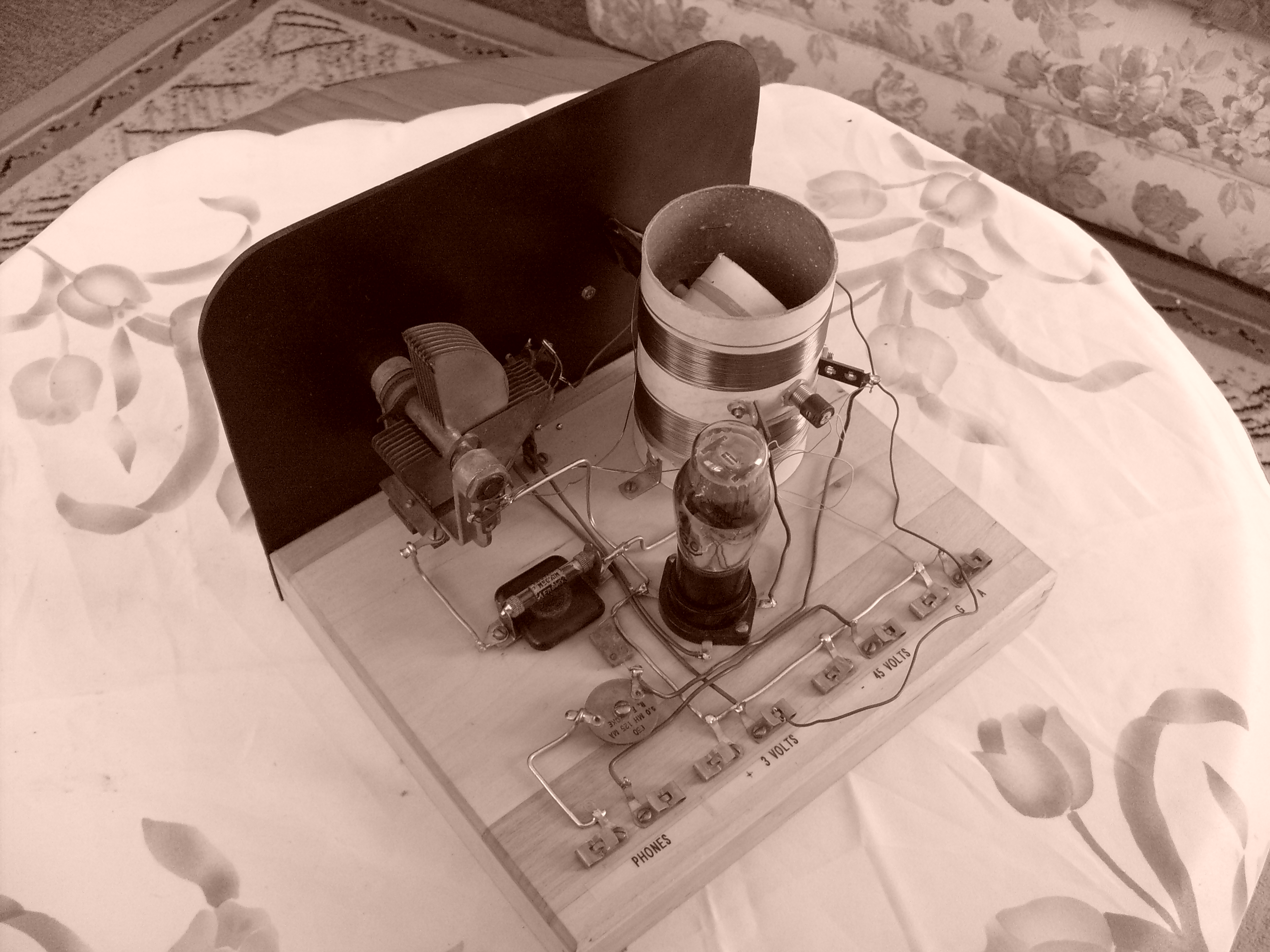
September 22, 1912: Edwin Armstrong makes first successful test of the revolutionary regnerative circuit

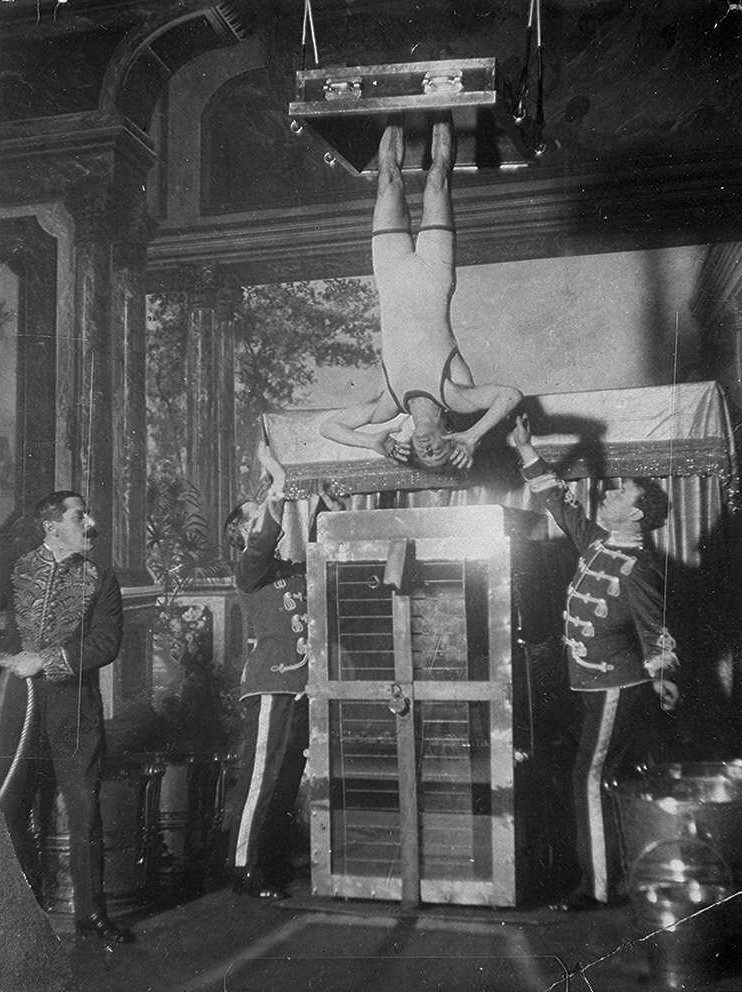
September 21, 1912: Houdini unveils most dangerous act yet

The following events occurred in September 1912:

== September 1, 1912 (Sunday) ==
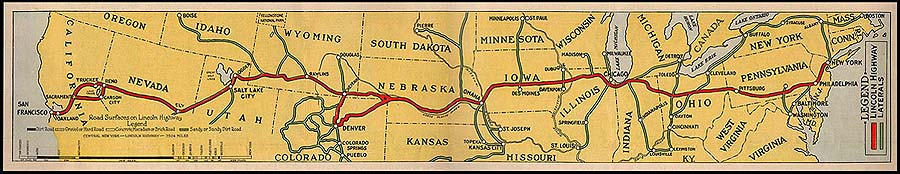
Fisher: "A road across the United States!"

- In Morocco, French troops put down a native uprising.
- At Indianapolis, entrepreneur Carl G. Fisher, President of the Prest-O-Lite Company and founder of the Indianapolis 500 race, hosted a dinner for his colleagues in the automotive industry and unveiled his plans for the Lincoln Highway. "A road across the United States! Let's build it before we're too old to enjoy it!" The auto trail, which paved roads to connect existing highways, would run from New York City to San Francisco, and would be completed in 1925.
- The All Souls Chapel held its first Sunday service at the Poland Spring resort in Poland, Maine. It was added to the National Register of Historic Places in 1977.
- Born:
  - Gwynfor Evans, Welsh politician, founder and first president of the Welsh nationalist party Plaid Cymru, Member of Parliament of Carmarthen from 1966 1970, and 1974 to 1979; in Barry, Wales (d. 2005)
  - Bernard Sarnat, American plastic surgeon and developer of craniofacial surgery techniques; in Chicago, United States (d. 2011). The Rhoda and Bernard Sarnat International Prize in Mental Health was named in honor of him and his wife.
- Died: Samuel Coleridge-Taylor, 37, English composer, nicknamed "The African Mahler," contributor to the epic poem The Song of Hiawatha (b. 1875)

== September 2, 1912 (Monday) ==
- The much anticipated Romanian film Independența României premiered in Bucharest, depicting events of the Russo-Turkish War that led to Romania's independence. The response was mixed, in part as the film was a first-time production for most of the actors and crew involved and many errors made their way onto the screen. However, the film eventually became a financial success and is considered a milestone for Romanian cinema.
- In the United Kingdom, the Trades Union Congress president Will Thorne opened the TUC's annual conference with a demand for common ownership and an attack on the government for its behavior in the recent strikes.
- Woodrow Wilson opened his presidential campaign with a Labor Day address in Buffalo, New York.
- The first Calgary Stampede was held, running for six days and attracting 80,000 people.
- U.S. President William Howard Taft signed an executive order establishing the first "Naval Petroleum Reserve" (NPR-1) to be used for the United States Navy in the event of war. NPR-1 was located at a government-owned oil field in Kern County, California.
- Born:
  - David Daiches, British literary critic, author of The Place of Meaning in Poetry and A Critical History of English Literature; in Sunderland, County Durham, England (d. 2005)
  - Imre Finta, Hungarian-born Canadian army officer, first person prosecuted for war crimes under Canadian law; in Kolozsvár, Austria-Hungary (now Cluj-Napoca, Romania) (d. 2003)
  - Xuân Thủy, Vice President of Vietnam 1981-1982, Foreign Minister of North Vietnam, 1963 to 1965; in Ha Dong, French Indochina (now Vietnam) (d. 1985)

== September 3, 1912 (Tuesday) ==
- Sheik Shawish was arrested in Cairo on charges of conspiracy against Lord Kitchener and the Khedive.
- Nobody won a majority in the state election for Governor of Vermont, and the matter was sent to the state legislature to decide on October 2.
- Prince Arthur, Governor General of Canada, officially opened the Alberta Legislature Building in Edmonton, although construction on the provincial government building still continued until 1913.
- Arnold Schoenberg's Opus No. 16, composed in 1909 and entitled Five Pieces for Orchestra, was given its first public performance. Sir Henry Wood conducted the premiere at the Queen's Hall in London.
- The historic drama Drake of England by playwright Louis N. Parker was first performed at the His Majesty's Theatre in London and ran for 221 performances.

== September 4, 1912 (Wednesday) ==
- The Albanian Revolt ended, as the Ottoman Empire agreed to the demands of Albanian rebels in its Montenegro province.
- Fourteen people were killed in a coal mine explosion at the Clarence Coal Company at Pas-de-Calais, France.
- In London, 22 were injured in a tube collision on the Piccadilly line, the first ever such accident on London Underground.
- Died: William John McGee, 59, American geologist, note for his surveys of the Mississippi Valley and the quaternary lakes of California and Nevada (b. 1853)

== September 5, 1912 (Thursday) ==
- A ship, bringing the monument to commemorate the French victory of Napoleon over the Russians at Borodino, sank, killing all on board.
- Fifteen Christians were massacred by the Turks at Heimeli, near Scutari.
- The Girl in the Taxi, an English operetta adapted by Jean Gilbert from the German operetta Die keusche Susanne, opened at the Lyric Theatre in London, where it ran for 385 performances.
- Ellen Gric, a 22-year-old white woman living in Forsyth County, Georgia, reported she had been attacked and nearly raped by two black men near her home. The resulting allegations set off set of a series of violent attacks against black residents in the county and arrest of black men suspected of the crime even as doubts were raised about its validity.
- Arthur MacArthur Jr., former Governor-General of the Philippines, and father of future General Douglas MacArthur, suffered a fatal stroke while delivering an address to a reunion of the 24th Wisconsin regiment that he had commanded during the American Civil War. MacArthur was in Milwaukee, and after he recounted "one of the most remarkable scouting expeditions of the war", he told his men, "Your indomitable courage...", then halted his speech with the words, "Comrades, I am too weak to go on." He sat back down and collapsed, dying moments later.
- Born:
  - John Cage, American composer, leading figure in avant-garde music in the United States, including works such as 4′33″; in Los Angeles, United States (d. 1992)
  - Kristina Söderbaum, Swedish-born German actress, known for her roles in Nazi era films; as Beata Margareta Kristina Söderbaum, in Stockholm, Sweden (d. 2001)
  - Frank Thomas, American animation artist, member of the Disney's Nine Old Men, known for the Walt Disney films Snow White and the Seven Dwarfs, Pinocchio, and Bambi; in Santa Monica, California, United States (d. 2004)

== September 6, 1912 (Friday) ==
- The uprising of Moroccan pretender Ahmed al-Hiba was ended in a battle at Sidi Bou Othmane, as his force of 10,000 troops was decimated by 5,000 French troops led by Colonel Charles Mangin. The poorly armed Moroccan tribesmen, promised by al-Hiba "that French bullets would turn into water and French shells into watermelons", charged at Mangin's troops, who were aligned in a square formation with artillery at the center. Within two hours, 2,000 of al-Hiba's troops were dead and thousands more wounded; French losses were four dead and 23 wounded.
- Royal Flying Corps members Captain Patrick Hamilton and Lieutenant Athole Wyness Stuart were killed in a crash near Willian, Hertfordshire while flying a Deperdussin monoplane.
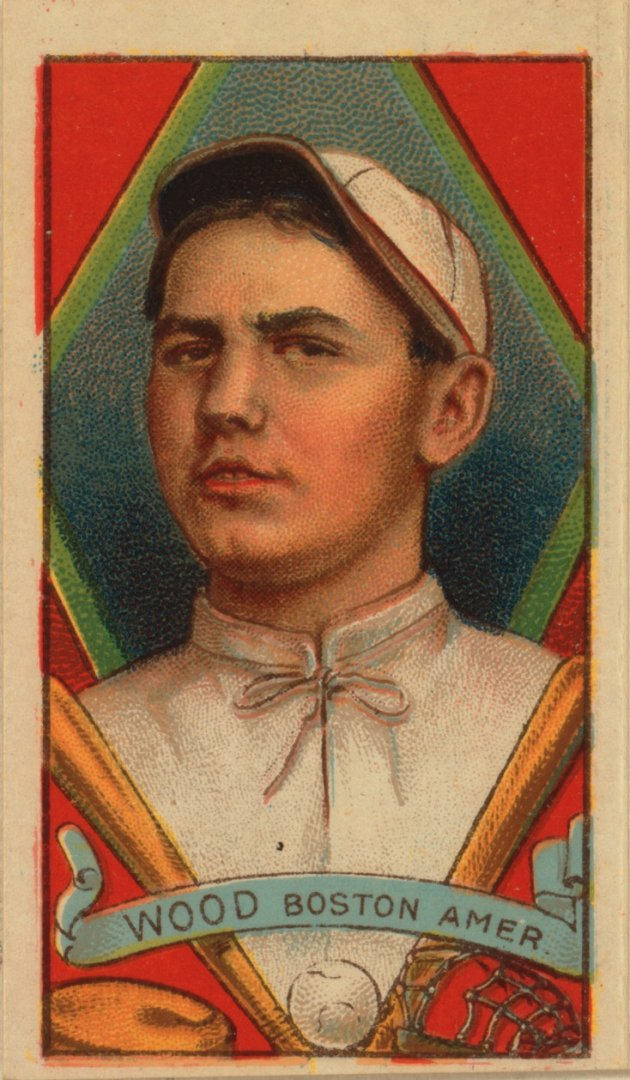
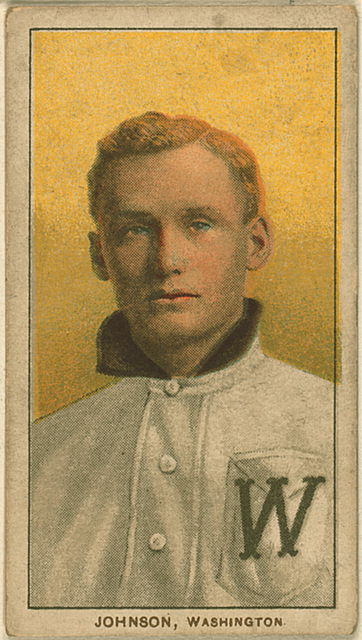
Smokey Joe Wood and Walter Johnson
- In what has been described as "the most anticipated and hyped sporting event" up to that time, the two best pitchers in the American League, Smoky Joe Wood of the Boston Red Sox and Walter Johnson of the Washington Senators, faced off against each other before an overflow crowd at Fenway Park. Wood was on a winning streak of 13 consecutive games, while Johnson had set a record of 16 straight wins the previous month. In a pitcher's duel, the two each threw five scoreless innings, until Johnson allowed a run to score in the sixth, the margin for a 1-0 victory for Wood and the Red Sox. Wood would go on to win two more games to tie, but not break, Johnson's record.

== September 7, 1912 (Saturday) ==
- Themistoklis Sofoulis, exiled leader of the Greek people on the island of Samos, landed with a force of Greek volunteers and drove away Ottoman Empire troops from the island.
- French Army troops, led by Colonel Charles Mangin, rescued nine French civilians who had been taken hostage by Moroccan pretender El Hiba at Marrakesh, but El Hiba himself escaped, setting the stage for a final battle later.
- Roland Garros of France broke the record for altitude in an airplane, reaching 16,405 feet (5,000 m) at Houlgate, near Trouville.
- The Madeira-Mamoré Railroad was completed after five years of construction, under the direction of American businessman Percival Farquhar, with the driving of a golden spike to link the track.
- Playing at the Chicago Golf Club in Wheaton, Illinois, Jerome Travers won the United States golf championship for the third time.
- At the Christ Episcopal Church in Harvard, Illinois, Miss Dorothy Gardner was married to Mr. Leslie King. Shortly after their son, Leslie Lynch King Jr., was born on July 14, 1913, Dorothy King would leave her husband, taking her child with her, and file for divorce. She would remarry in 1917, renaming Leslie Jr. as Gerald Ford, who would grow up to become the 38th President of the United States.
- Born: David Packard, co-founder (with Bill Hewlett) of Hewlett-Packard; in Pueblo, Colorado, United States (d. 1996)
- Died: Arthur "Bugs" Raymond, 30, former pitcher for the Detroit Tigers, St. Louis Cardinals, and New York Giants; following the fracture of his skull in a bar fight (b. 1882)

== September 8, 1912 (Sunday) ==
- Motorcyclist Eddie Hasha lost control of his bike during a race at the Vailsburg Motordrome in Newark, New Jersey, killing himself, six spectators and another racer, John Albright. Another 17 people in the crowd were injured.
- Four spectators were killed and almost 20 injured when Pierre Biard lost control of his airplane and plowed into the crowd at an air meet in Gray, Haute-Saône, France.
- The Argentine Air Force was established as a military flying school at El Palomar, Buenos Aires.
- Born: Alexander Mackendrick, American-Scottish film director, known for films The Ladykillers and Sweet Smell of Success; in Boston, United States (d. 1993)

== September 9, 1912 (Monday) ==
- Marko Trifković resigned as Prime Minister of Serbia, along with his cabinet.
- In Athens, mass demonstrations demanded the liberation of all Greeks from Ottoman rule.
- Sleety Mae Crow, an 18-year old white woman in Forsyth County, Georgia, was raped and murdered. Suspicions fell to 16-year black teen Ernest Knox, who allegedly confessed under suspected torture following his arrest. Three other black young men associated with him and arrested. A lynch mob stormed the county jail where one of the prisoners was killed, but Knox had already been moved for safety.
- Flying a Deperdussin Monocoque monoplane, Jules Védrines won his fourth Gordon Bennett Trophy race at a speed of 169.7 km/h (105.4 mph).
- A new comet was discovered by Australian astronomer Walter Frederick Gale.
- Screen legend siblings Lillian Gish and Dorothy Gish made their screen debut together in the film short An Unseen Enemy, beginning their successful collaboration with filmmaker D. W. Griffith.

== September 10, 1912 (Tuesday) ==
- A bomb explosion at a market at the Macedonian town of Doiran, near Salonika, killed 20 and injured 30.
- Royal Flying Corps officers Claude Bettington and Edward Hotchkiss were killed when the Bristol monoplane they were flying over Wolvercote, Oxfordshire, England crashed after one of the bracing writes to the wings detached. The crash resulted in all monoplanes being grounded for five months.
- The Bank in Winterthur and Toggenburger Bank merged to form the Union Bank of Switzerland in Zürich.
- Nippon Katsudō (Activity) Film Production was founded in Kyoto, as predecessor of the filmmaking and operating company Nikkatsu.
- The drama The Governor's Lady by Alice Bradley opened at the Republic Theatre in New York City and ran for 135 performances.
- Born: Mary Walter, Filipino film actress who worked in eight consecutive decades; in Sorsogon City, Philippine Islands (now the Philippines) (d. 1993)

== September 11, 1912 (Wednesday) ==
- Italian Army Captain Riccardo Moizo became the first pilot to become a prisoner of war after his Nieuport airplane was forced to land at Azizia in Libya during the Italo-Turkish War.
- The crime play Within the Law, by Bayard Veiller, premiered at Empire Theatre on Broadway, New York City. The production was a hit and ran for 541 performances and adapted to film five times.
- Born: Robin Jenkins, Scottish writer, author of The Cone Gatherers; as John Robin Jenkins, in Cambuslang, Lanarkshire, Scotland (d. 2005)
- Died: Etta Duryea Johnson, 31, the white wife of African American boxing champion Jack Johnson, died from a self-inflicted gunshot wound to the head.

== September 12, 1912 (Thursday) ==
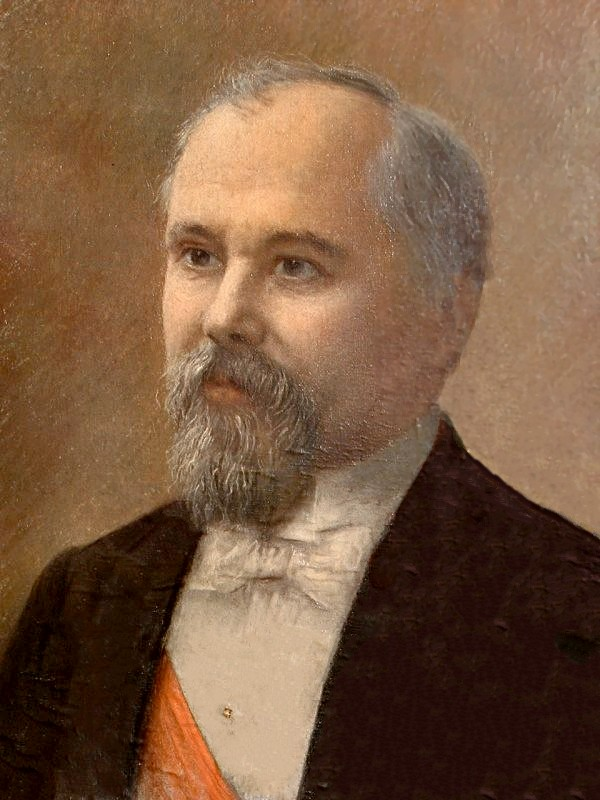
Prime Minister Raymond Poincaré

- After French Prime Minister Raymond Poincaré signed an agreement in Moscow with the Russian Empire, Russia ratified the Franco-Russian Convention, providing that if the German Empire mobilized its troops, France and Russia would do the same.
- Born: Feroze Gandhi, Indian journalist and activist, publisher of the National Herald and Navjivan, husband of Indira Gandhi and father of Rajiv Gandhi who both served as Prime Minister of India after his death, and son-in-law of Prime Minister Jawaharlal Nehru; as Feroze Jehangir Ghandy, in Bombay, British India (now Mumbai, India) (d. 1960)

== September 13, 1912 (Friday) ==
- The government of Santo Domingo (now the Dominican Republic) was threatened by revolution, prompting the United States to send aid.
- The funeral of the Emperor Meiji was held at Tokyo, after which the body was taken on its journey to Motoyama, Japan. Following the Emperor's funeral, former General Nogi Maresuke, 62, committed ritual suicide with his 52-year old wife Nogi Shizuku. Maresuke had requested Emperor Meiji twice when he was alive for the monarch's permission to allow him to commit suicide and restore honor to his family after he lost too many men in the Battle of Port Arthur that opened the Russo-Japanese War.
- Born: Reta Shaw, American actress, best known for her supporting role in the 1960s supernatural television series The Ghost & Mrs. Muir; in South Paris, Maine, United States (d. 1982)
- Died: Joseph Furphy, 68, Australian writer, author of novels Such Is Life and Rigby's Romance (b. 1843)

== September 14, 1912 (Saturday) ==
- Montenegro entered into an alliance with Serbia.
- Groundbreaking was held for the Trans-Australian Railway, with Governor-General Lord Denman turning the first spade of earth at Port Augusta, South Australia. The railroad, which stretches to Kalgoorlie, Western Australia would be completed on October 17, 1917.
- Rioting at a soccer football match at Belfast injured 100 people.
- Cattle baron John Beal Sneed shot and killed Albert Boyce, Jr. in Amarillo, Texas, on suspicion he orchestrated the murder of Sneed's father back in Georgetown, Texas, before surrendering to authorities. Sneed had shot Boyce's father dead in Fort Worth, Texas, at the start over year over an affair between Boyce and Sneed's wife, Lenora. Despite authorities concerned that the bloody feud, which by now has claimed seven lives, would yield more violence, potential combatants dispersed within the town. Sneed was able to successfully defend both murders as justifiable and was acquitted for a second time.
- Died: Howard W. Gill, 30, American pilot, died from injuries sustained from a crash when he struck another plane taking off just as he was going in for a landing at Cicero Field in Chicago.

== September 15, 1912 (Sunday) ==
- In fighting between French forces and Moorish tribesmen at Sidi Kacem in Morocco, nine French soldiers were killed and 30 wounded.
- Ten recruits and a gunner's mate at the United States Navy training school at Chicago were drowned in the capsizing of a launch at Lake Michigan.
- John Flammang Schrank, a bartender from New York City, began working on his plan to assassinate former U.S. President Theodore Roosevelt, after having a dream that the late U.S. President William McKinley had pointed to Roosevelt and said, "This is my murderer, avenge my death." Schrank would catch up with Roosevelt, who was campaigning for a new term as President, on October 14.
- On the 91st anniversary of its independence, El Salvador adopted the flag that it uses today, restoring the blue and white tricolor flag that it had abandoned in 1865.

== September 16, 1912 (Monday) ==
- A typhoon, with winds of more than 200 miles per hour, struck the city of Taito on the Japanese-controlled island of Formosa (now Taitung City of Taiwan). The winds killed 107 people, injured 293, and destroyed 91,400 houses. In addition, the storm sank the city's fishing boats and ruined the rice and sugar crops.
- Liang Ju-hao became the new Foreign Minister of China. The initial dispatch from foreign correspondent mistakenly stated that "the new Minister is unable to read the Chinese language, though he is well educated from the Western point of view", which would cause the Times of London to run a correction on November 15.
- The musical The Count of Luxembourg made Broadway debut at the New Amsterdam Theatre in New York City for a run of 120 performances.
- The opera Zingari by Ruggero Leoncavallo premiered at the Hippodrome in London.
- Born: Don A. Jones, United States Army officer, last director of the United States Coast and Geodetic Survey and second director of the Environmental Science Services Administration Corps; in Waldron, Michigan, United States (d. 2000)

== September 17, 1912 (Tuesday) ==
- In a battle at Derna in modern-day Libya, as many as 2,000 Turks and Arabs were killed, and 61 Italian forces died.
- Fifteen people were burned to death and 14 injured when a train caught fire at the Ditton railway station in Ditton, Cheshire, England.
- Starting at midnight, the Kingdom of Greece began drafting its adult male citizens into the Army and Navy in preparation for war.
- French aviator Georges Legagneux broke the altitude record, reaching 18,767 feet (5,720 m) while flying an airplane over Houlgate in France.

== September 18, 1912 (Wednesday) ==
- Representatives of the four-nation banking consortium informed China's finance minister Zhou Xuexi, that the railway loan was subject to four conditions, including repayment through a new tax on salt, bank consortium approval of any financial reforms, and appointment of technicians from the four nations.

== September 19, 1912 (Thursday) ==
1912 version of Australian coat of arms

1908 version of Australian coat of arms

- The current coat of arms of Australia was formally approved, after Prime Minister Andrew Fisher made various changes to the 1908 version.
- The Glamorgan County Hall opened in Cardiff.
- A force of 400 U.S. Marines under command of Smedley Butler defeated a Nicaraguan cavalry of 150 men under command of Benjamín Zeledón at Masaya, Nicaragua.

== September 20, 1912 (Friday) ==
- Sir Muirhead Collins, the Secretary of the Australian Department of Defence, approved a recommendation from the Army Chief of General Staff to create the Australian Flying Corps, beginning with the purchase of five aircraft and the hiring of two flight instructors.
- Salar-ed-Dowleh, pretender to the throne of Persia (now Iran) and uncle of the reigning Shah, captured the western city of Kermanshah, Persia.
- Italian forces captured Zanzur oasis near Tripoli after a twelve-hour battle in the Italo-Turkish War.
- Association football club Regatas Brasil was established in Maceió, Brazil.
- The first transcontinental truck delivery in the United States was completed when truck manufacturer American Locomotive Company (ALCO) completed the transportation of three tons of Parrot Soap, specifically its olive silk variety. Delivery was made to the San Francisco City Hall, 91 days after an ALCO truck had started from Philadelphia.
- Born: Frank Zeidler, American politician, member of the Socialist Party of America, Mayor of Milwaukee 1948 to 1960; in Milwaukee, United States (d. 2006)
- Died: Otello Capitani, 22, Italian Olympic artistic gymnast, was killed in action during the Italo-Turkish War.

== September 21, 1912 (Saturday) ==
- The first airport was established in Norway at Kjeller.
- Harry Houdini gave the first public performance of his latest death-defying act, the escape from the Chinese Water Torture Cell. The trick, never done before by anyone, required Houdini to get out of a locked steel and glass tank of water while hanging upside-down. Houdini accomplished the stunt before an audience at the Circus Busch in Berlin.
- The first six-point touchdowns were scored in Carlisle Indian School's 50-7 win over Albright College, and Rhode Island's 7-0 defeat of Massachusetts Agricultural (now University of Massachusetts Amherst). Previously, touchdowns had been worth five points.
- English stage producer and actor Harley Granville-Barker's premiered a modern reworking of The Winter's Tale by William Shakespeare at the Savoy Theatre in London, with simplified scenery, ensemble acting and an emphasis of delivering the play's verses more naturalistically.
- Zane Grey, the well-known Western novelist, co-founded the "Porpoise Club" with his friend Robert H. Davis of Munsey's Magazine, to popularize the sport of hunting of dolphins and porpoises. Their first catch off of Sea Bright, New Jersey, where they harpooned and then reeled in a bottlenose dolphin.
- Born:
  - Chuck Jones, American animated filmmaker, best known for his work with Warner Bros. Cartoons and popularizing Bugs Bunny, Daffy Duck, Wile E. Coyote and the Road Runner, Pepé Le Pew and Porky Pig, founder of Sib Tower 12 Productions which produced Tom and Jerry and How the Grinch Stole Christmas!, and Horton Hears a Who!; as Charles Jones, in Spokane, Washington, United States (d. 2002)
  - Ted Daffan, American country musician, known for country hits including "Truck Drivers' Blues"; as Theron Daffan, in Beauregard Parish, Louisiana, United States (d. 1996)

== September 22, 1912 (Sunday) ==
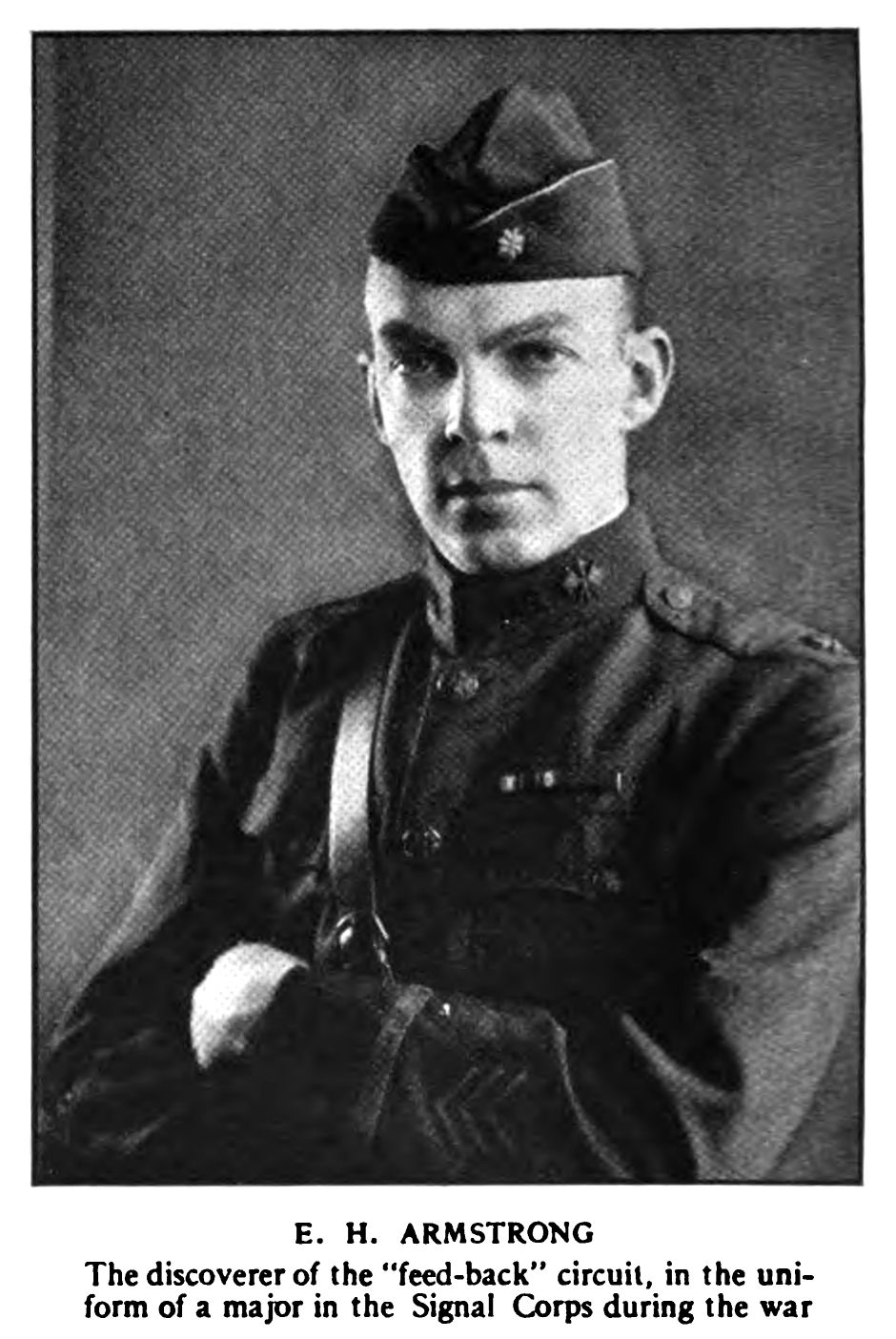
Edwin H. Armstrong

- Greece and Bulgaria strengthened their defense alliance, signed in May, with details for conditions and procedures for mobilization of their armed forces.
- Edwin Howard Armstrong, a 21-year-old electrical engineering student at Columbia University, made the first successful test of his invention, the regenerative circuit, amplifying faint radio signals to normal levels by repeatedly feeding current through the relatively new Audion grid. The regenerative circuit revolutionized the reception of radio waves, and, with in a few months, was used to improve radio transmission.
- The Friedenskirche (Church of Peace) was inaugurated in Johannesburg.
- Born:
  - Martha Scott, American actor, known for her film roles in Our Town, The Ten Commandments, and Ben-Hur; in Jamesport, Missouri, United States (d. 2003)
  - Alfred G. Vanderbilt Jr., American horse racing magnate, son of Alfred Gwynne Vanderbilt; in London, England (d. 1999)
  - Herbert Mataré, German physicist and inventor of Le Transistron, the first European transistor; in Aachen, German Empire (now Germany) (d. 2011)

== September 23, 1912 (Monday) ==
- U.S. President William Howard Taft issued an executive order barring foreign ships, whether commercial or military, from the waters of Hawaii's Pearl Harbor, Cuba's Guantánamo Bay, and the Philippines' Subic Bay. The entire island of Guam was ordered completely off limits, effectively cutting its civilian population off from the outside world, with restrictions remaining in place until the 1950s.
- Born: Tony Smith, American sculptor, known for his minimalist works including Light Up and The Fourth Sign; as Anthony Smith, in South Orange, New Jersey, United States (d. 1980)

== September 24, 1912 (Tuesday) ==
- The Ottoman Empire mobilized its European forces, with 175,000 in the Western Army at Macedonia and 115,000 in the Eastern Army at Thrace.
- A group of 750 U.S. Marines was dispatched to the Dominican Republic to protect American interests. The U.S. intervention led to a temporary halt in the civil war that had begun after the assassination of President Ramón Cáceres in November 1911.
- Born:
  - Robert Lewis Taylor, American writer, author of The Travels of Jaimie McPheeters, in Carbondale, Illinois, United States (d. 1998)
  - Don Porter, American television actor known as the boss on Private Secretary and as the father on Gidget; as Donald Porter, in Miami, Oklahoma, United States (d. 1997)
- Died: Adolf Marschall von Bieberstein, 69, German diplomat, Foreign Minister of Germany from 1894 to 1897 (b. 1842)

== September 25, 1912 (Wednesday) ==
- In Nicaragua, General Luis Mena and 700 rebels surrendered when confronted by a 2,700 member force of U.S. Marines and U.S. Navy Bluejackets.
- British and French cruisers landed marines to protect foreigners on the island of Samos.
- The first radio transmissions from Antarctica were made, as a station on Macquarie Island was set up by five men from the Australasian Antarctic Expedition.
- The cornerstone of the new Students' Building was laid at Vassar College in Poughkeepsie, New York.

== September 26, 1912 (Thursday) ==
- Aviation pioneer Charles Voisin died and Raymonde de Laroche suffered serious injuries in an automobile accident near Lyon, France.
- The Australian Inland Mission (A.I.M.) was created by decision of the members of the General Assembly of the Presbyterian Church of Australia. Organized by Presbyterian minister John Flynn, the A.I.M. sought to bring the Christian faith into Australia's outback, and to fulfill a secondary mission of insuring that "hospital and nursing facilities are provided within a hundred miles of every spot in Australia where women and children reside."
- The Elks of Canada fraternal organization, a counterpart to the American club, Benevolent and Protective Order of Elks, was founded in Canada. Currently the organization describes themselves: "The Elks of Canada is the largest, all-Canadian, fraternal organization in Canada with nearly 14,000 members in over 250 locations throughout the country."
- Born: Preston Cloud, American paleontologist, best known for developing the geologic time scale and research into the Cambrian explosion; in West Upton, Massachusetts, United States (d. 1991)

== September 27, 1912 (Friday) ==
- Leslie King began to abuse his new bride, Dorothy King, while the couple were on their honeymoon at the Multnomah Hotel in Portland, Oregon. The incident was the first of many recited in Mrs. King's divorce petition, found by historians later, after the couple's child had grown up to become U.S. President Gerald Ford.
- Born: Tauno Marttinen, Finnish composer; in Helsinki, Finland (d. 2008)

== September 28, 1912 (Saturday) ==
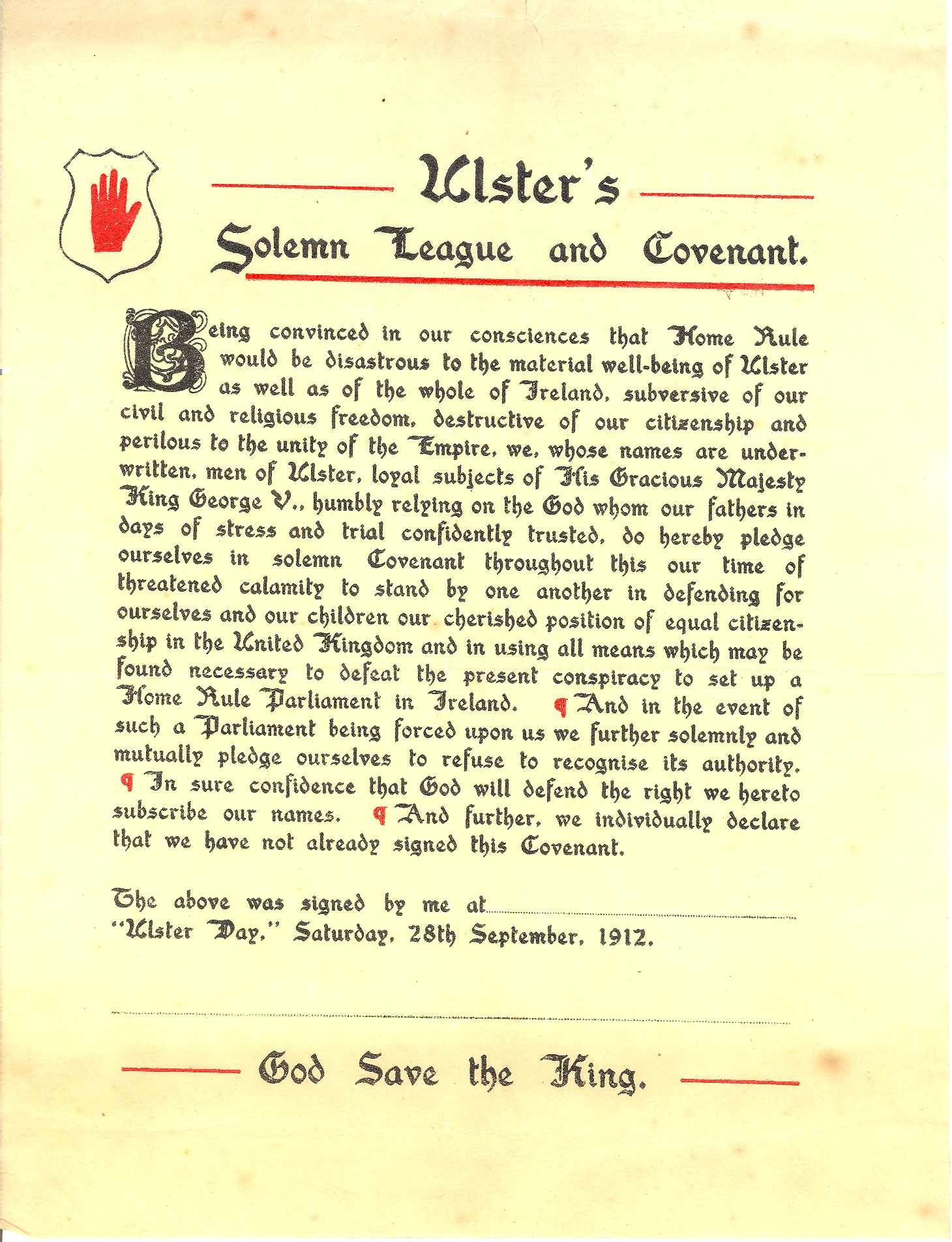
Ulster Covenant

- Japanese steamship Kiche Maru sank in a typhoon off Japan with over 1,000 dead. While casualties were second to the Titanic sinking in April, it was overshadowed as hundreds of other ships were lost during the storm.
- Signing of the Ulster Covenant, a protest by adult citizens of the province in northern Ireland against a proposal to give Ireland self-government apart from the United Kingdom, was completed. Over a period of six days, beginning on September 23, the Covenant was signed by 237,368 men, while a companion document, the Ulster Declaration, was signed by 234,046 women, virtually the entire adult Protestant population of Ulster.
- In protest over the National Insurance Act, a majority of British doctors resigned their contracts with medical clubs.
- The French dreadnought Paris, with twelve 12-inch guns and 26 smaller cannons and described as "the most formidable ship in the French Navy", was launched at Touloun, France.
- At Seoul, 106 Koreans were sentenced on charges of conspiracy against Count Terauchi, with terms of 5 to 10 years. The most prominent of the convicts, former Korean cabinet minister Baron Yun Chi Ho, got a ten-year sentence. Nine other prisoners were released.
- Corporal Frank S. Scott of the United States Army became the first enlisted service member to lose his life in an airplane accident. He and Lt. Lewis C. Rockwell perished in the crash of a Wright aircraft at College Park, Maryland.
- The Essendon Bombers defeated the South Melbourne Swans 5.17 (47) to 4.9 (33) in the 15th Victoria Football League Grand Final in Melbourne.
- American ragtime composer W. C. Handy self-published "The Memphis Blues" as an instrumental. Lyrics were later added when it was sold to George "Honey Boy" Evans as a minstrel piece.

== September 29, 1912 (Sunday) ==
- The first airplane flight in Venezuela was made by Frank Boland, who circled Caracas for 27 minutes in a plane made of bamboo.
- French and British marines captured the city of Vathy on the island of Samos.
- The first IAAF world record for the javelin throw was set by Eric Lemming of Sweden, at 62.32 meters (204.46 feet).
- Born: Michelangelo Antonioni, Italian film director, known for films including L'Avventura and Blowup; in Ferrara, Kingdom of Italy (now Italy) (d. 2007)

== September 30, 1912 (Monday) ==
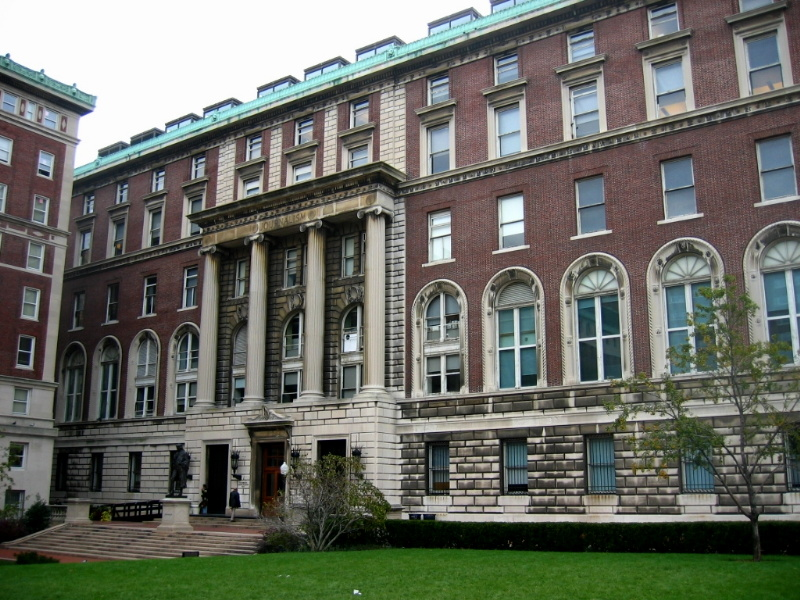
September 30, 1912: Columbia School of Journalism opens

- Six British explorers, who had been left stranded in Antarctica by the Terra Nova Expedition, were able to leave the ice cave where they had stayed for seven months during a harsh winter. The men—Commander Victor Campbell, Dr. Murray Levick, Raymond Priestly, George Abbott, Frank Browning and Seaman Harry Dickason—still had to walk 200 miles to Cape Evans before their ordeal would be over.
- The prestigious Columbia School of Journalism, provided for by the will of Joseph Pulitzer, opened at Columbia University, with a class of 79 students.
- Aircraft designer Igor Sikorsky won the international military competition at Petrograd flying the Sikorsky prototype.
- The musical Oh! Oh! Delphine by C. M. S. McLellan and Ivan Caryll opened at the Knickerbocker Theatre in New York City and ran for 258 performances.
