= July 1912 =

Month of 1912

<<	July 1912					>>
Su	Mo	Tu	We	Th	Fr	Sa
	1	2	3	4	5	6
7	8	9	10	11	12	13
14	15	16	17	18	19	20
21	22	23	24	25	26	27
28	29	30	31

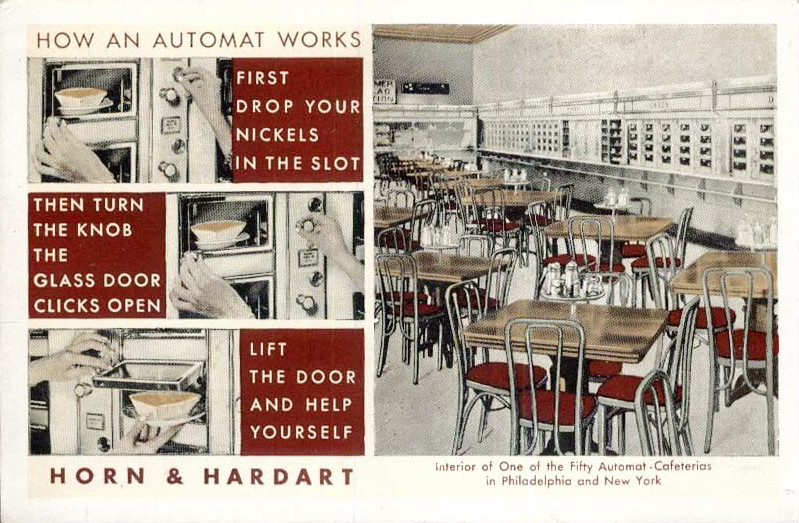
July 7, 1912: The Automat opens, introduces "fast food"

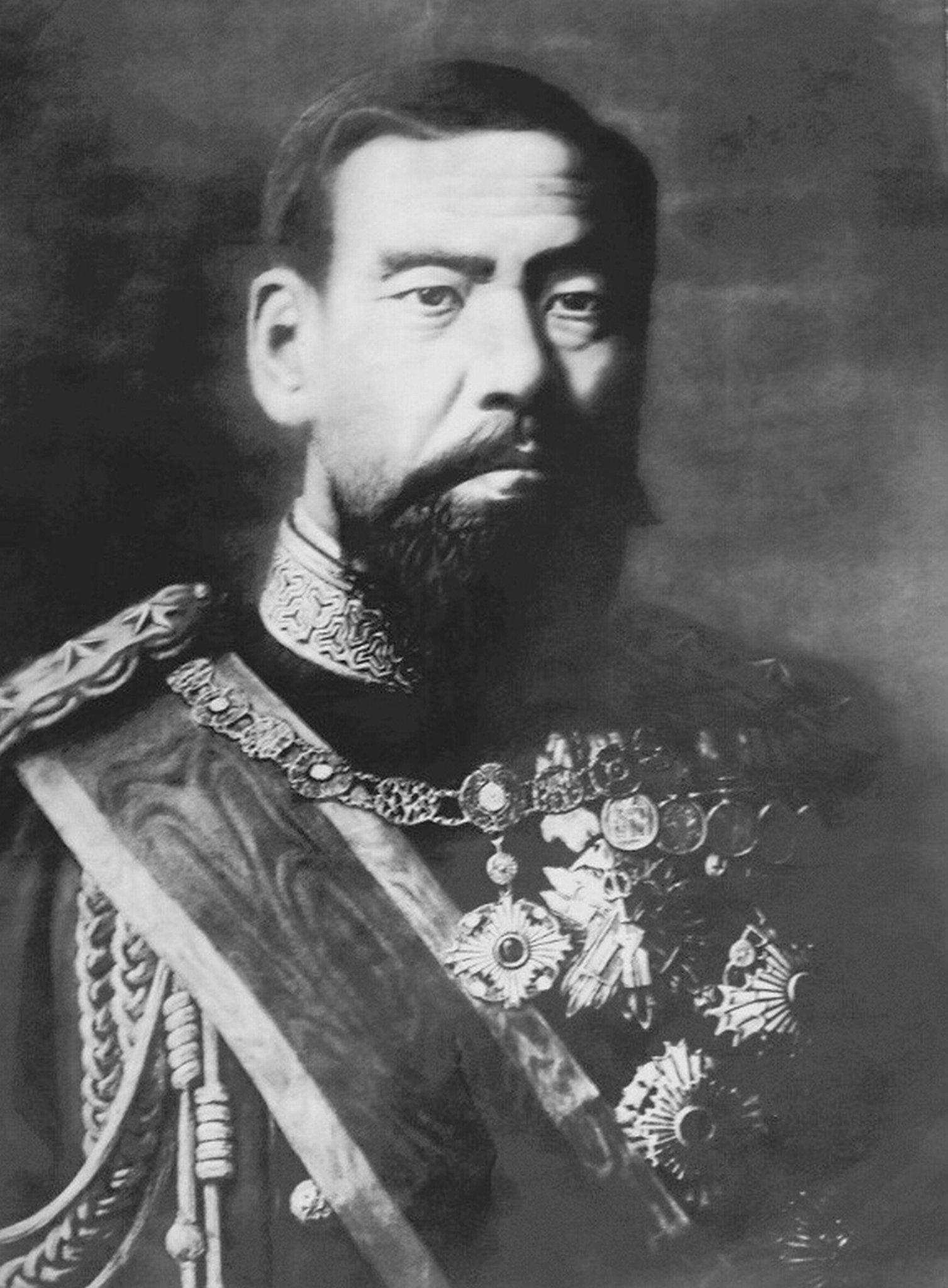
July 30, 1912: Emperor Meiji dies after 44 years of transforming Japan into a major world power.

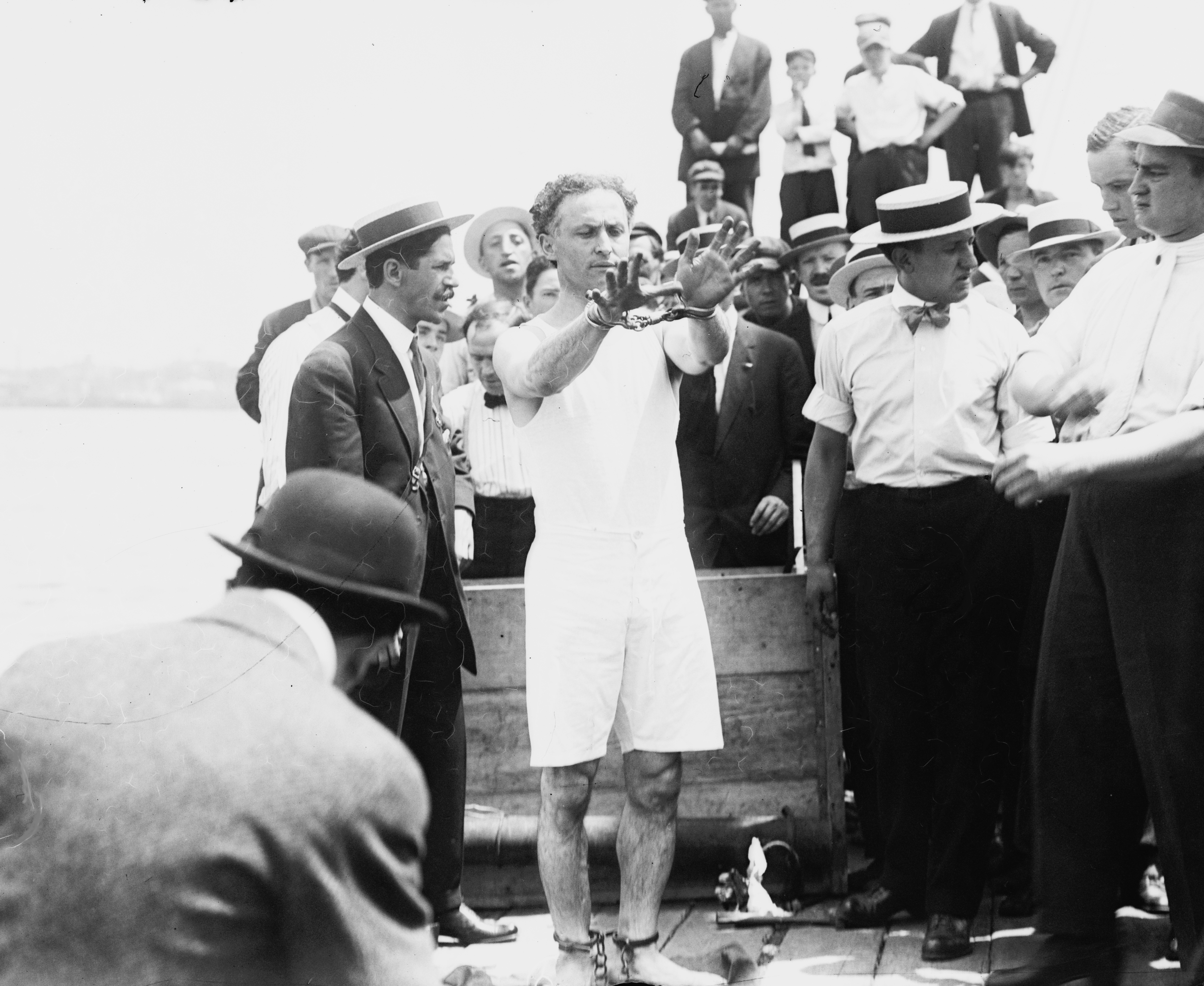
July 7, 1912: Harry Houdini escapes handcuffs, leg irons, and an underwater coffin

The following events occurred in July 1912:

== July 1, 1912 (Monday) ==
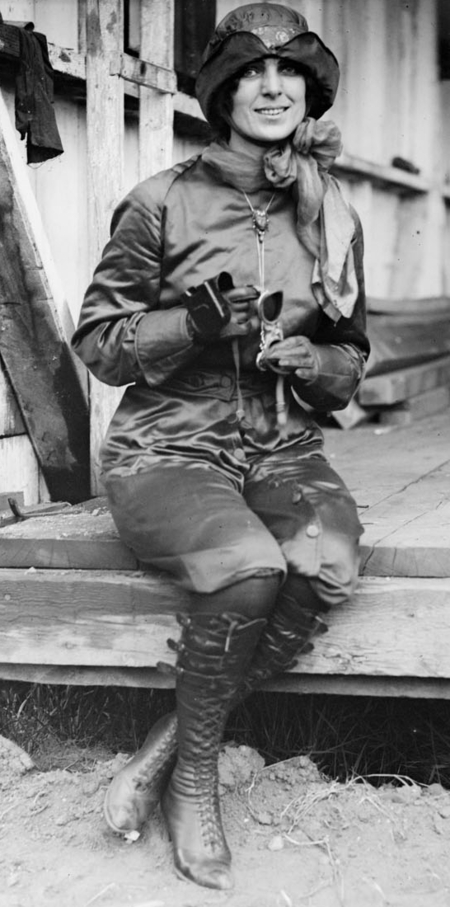
Harriet Quimby

- The French Chamber of Deputies voted 460–79 to approve the protectorate over Morocco.
- The first payments under the British National Insurance Act 1911 were collected, with the first benefits to be paid on January 1, 1913.
- The British Copyright Act 1911 came into effect.
- A new law went into effect in Egypt, making all ancient artifacts property of the state. Dealers were required to have a license, items could not be exported without a permit, and any evasion of the law would be punishable by confiscation of the items.
- The Woolworth Building in New York City became the world's tallest skyscraper, at 792 feet (241 m), with the driving in of the final rivet to its steel frame, and would be completed by April 1, 1913.
- Russian ethnologist Shloyme Ansky, with the backing of philanthropist Goratsii Gintsburg (Horace Günzburg), launched the Jewish Ethnographic Expedition, a project that collected and preserved thousands of Jewish artifacts in Russia until the outbreak of World War I.
- The Conway Seashore Railroad was bought out by Atlantic Coast Line Railroad in Myrtle Beach, South Carolina.
- The Minnesota–Wisconsin Minor Baseball League formally disbanded with the Winona Pirates being its final champions.
- Born:
  - David Brower, American activist, founder of Friends of the Earth and the Earth Island Institute; in Berkeley, California, United States (d. 2000)
  - Sally Kirkland, American fashion editor, manager of Lord & Taylor, editor for Vogue and Life; as Sarah Phinney in El Reno, Oklahoma, United States (d. 1989)
- Died: Harriet Quimby, 37, the first American woman to gain a pilot's license and first woman to fly solo across the English Channel (only a few months earlier), is killed, along with a passenger, William A.P. Willard, when her airplane suddenly pitched forward, throwing them out of their seats. Quimby and Willard fell from an altitude of 1,000 feet (300 m), into 5-foot (1.5 m) deep waters in Dorchester Bay near Squantum, Massachusetts, where Quimby had been participating in an airshow organized by Willard (b. 1875).

== July 2, 1912 (Tuesday) ==
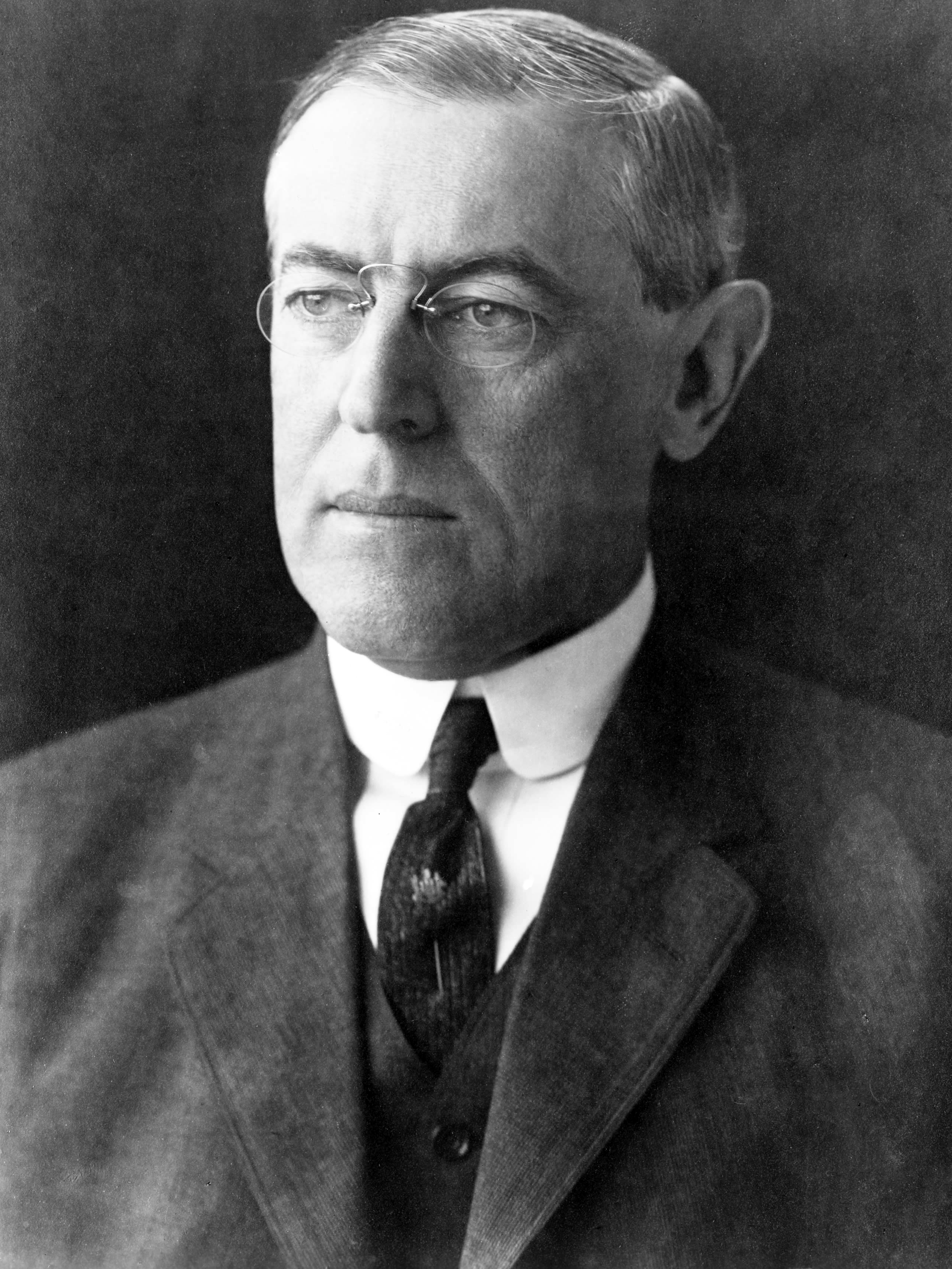
Governor Woodrow Wilson

- New Jersey Governor Woodrow Wilson received the Democratic Party nomination for President of the United States, after 46 ballots had been taken at the party convention. On the 45th ballot, with 730 votes needed to win, Wilson had 633, former House Speaker Champ Clark had 306, and Alabama Senator Oscar Underwood had 97. Underwood then withdrew his candidacy, putting the nomination within reach, and Clark followed suit. The final result was 990 votes for Wilson, 84 for Champ Clark, and 12 for Judson Harmon. With the Republican Party split between the followers of U.S. President William Howard Taft and former U.S. President Theodore Roosevelt, the Democrats would win the U.S. presidency for the first time since 1892.
- The airship Akron exploded in mid-air near Atlantic City, New Jersey, killing the five crew members on board including pioneer aerial photographer Melvin Vaniman.
- Denmark established an army air corps to complement the naval air corps formed the previous year. The two units merged in 1950 to become the Royal Danish Air Force.
- Born: Bill Mitchell, American automobile designer, best known iconic vehicle designs for Chevrolet including the Bel Air, the Stingray, and the Camaro; in Cleveland, Ohio, United States (d. 1988)
- Died: Tom Richardson, 41, English cricketer, fast bowler for the England cricket team from 1893 to 1898, died from a heart attack (b. 1870).

== July 3, 1912 (Wednesday) ==
- The royal commission into the sinking of the Titanic wrapped in London after 42 days of investigation involving interviews with nearly 100 witnesses, making it the longest and most detailed British public inquiry up until that time.
- Sixteen miners were killed and six injured in an explosion at the Osterfeld colliery near Oberhausen in Germany.
- Sir Francis Henry May, recently appointed as the British Governor of Hong Kong, escaped an assassination attempt. A Chinese resident fired a revolver, striking the chair in which May had been sitting, but missed the Governor.
- Indiana Governor Thomas R. Marshall received the Democratic Party's nomination for vice-president at 1:56 am, more than eight hours after Woodrow Wilson had won the presidential nomination. In a statement, Wilson said of Marshall, "I feel honored by having him as a running mate," cited by William Safire as the possible "first recorded use of the term by a presidential nominee" to describe the vice-presidential nominee on his ticket, and giving a new meaning for a horse racing term.
- The Turkish Air Academy was founded as the Ottoman Empire began training its own pilots and flight officers.
- William Merriam Burton applied for the patent of the thermal cracking process that he had invented, which greatly increased the amount of gasoline that could be developed from crude oil. U.S. Patent No. 1,049,667 would be granted on January 7, 1913.
- In fiction, con man Harold Hill arrives in River City, Iowa, on the day before the town's Independence Day festivities in the opening act of Meredith Willson's 1957 musical The Music Man.
- Born:
  - Hans Raj Khanna, Indian judge, justice of the Supreme Court of India from 1971 to 1977, recipient of the Padma Vibhushan; in Amritsar, Punjab Province, British India (now Punjab, India) (d. 2008)
  - Elizabeth Taylor, British writer, author of A View of the Harbour and Mrs. Palfrey at the Claremont; as Elizabeth "Betty" Coles in Reading, Berkshire, England (d. 1975)
- Died: Robert Hoke, 75, American army officer, major general for the Confederate States Army during the American Civil War (b. 1837)

== July 4, 1912 (Thursday) ==
The wreck of Lackawanna Train Number 9

48-star version of the United States flag

- Forty-one people were killed and 50 injured in a railroad accident near Corning, New York. Train Number 9 of the Lackawanna Railroad had stopped at Gibson, a village near Corning, when at 5:06 am it was struck at 65 miles per hour (105 km/h) by a train of the United States Express, whose engineer had disregarded "three sets of conspicuous warning signals."
- The International Olympic Committee voted to hold the 1916 Summer Olympics in Berlin, rejecting a bid from Budapest. The Games of the Sixth Olympiad would be cancelled after the outbreak of World War I in 1914.
- The new 48-star American flag was first raised. Proclaimed as the symbol of the United States, it would continue to be used for forty-seven years, until July 4, 1959, when replaced by a 49-star banner. Until 2007, the 48-star flag had been the longest-lasting American flag in history.
- Heavyweight boxing champion Jack Johnson successfully defended his title against white challenger "Fireman Jim Flynn" in East Las Vegas, New Mexico. The bout was scheduled to go for as many as 45 rounds but was stopped by New Mexico state police, who entered the ring in the ninth round at the request of Governor McDonald.
- Lightweight boxing champ Ad Wolgast fought challenger "Mexican Joe Rivers" in Los Angeles. In the third round, the fighters knocked each other out with simultaneous blows. Referee Jack Welch lifted the arm of the prone Wolgast and declared him the winner and still champion.
- French cyclist Gabriel Poulain won a contest for human powered flight by remaining at least 10 centimetres (3.9 in) off the ground for 3.6 meters, slightly less than 12 feet.
- Died: Emil Stang, 78, Prime Minister of Norway (1889–1891 and 1893–1895)(b. 1834)

== July 5, 1912 (Friday) ==
- In the second fatal American railroad crash in two days, 26 people were killed and 29 injured when a freight train rear-ended a passenger train on the Ligonier Valley Railroad near the resort town of Wilpen, Pennsylvania. Most of the victims were women and children, who were returning home after a day at the Wilpen Fair Grounds.
- The first International Radiotelegraph Convention was signed in London. It would be replaced in 1927 by the Radiotelegraph General Convention.

== July 6, 1912 (Saturday) ==
- The 1912 Summer Olympics were formally opened at the national stadium in Stockholm by declaration of King Gustaf. Twenty-eight nations and 2,407 athletes, including 48 women, participated.
- The brief administration of New Zealand Prime Minister Thomas Mackenzie was brought down in a motion of no confidence, with a vote of 41–33, after four members of his own party voted against him.
- The cornerstone for the high school in Moscow, Idaho, was laid, with the school completed and opened six months later. It was registered with the National Register of Historic Places in 1992.
- Born:
  - Heinrich Harrer, Austrian mountaineer and writer, leader of the mountaineering team to climb the north face of Eiger in the Bernese Alps, author of Seven Years in Tibet and The White Spider; in Hüttenberg, Austria-Hungary (now Austria) (d. 2006)
  - Molly Yard, American social activist, feminist, assistant to Eleanor Roosevelt, President of National Organization for Women from 1987 to 1991; as Mary Yard in Chengdu, Republic of China (now China) (d. 2005)

== July 7, 1912 (Sunday) ==
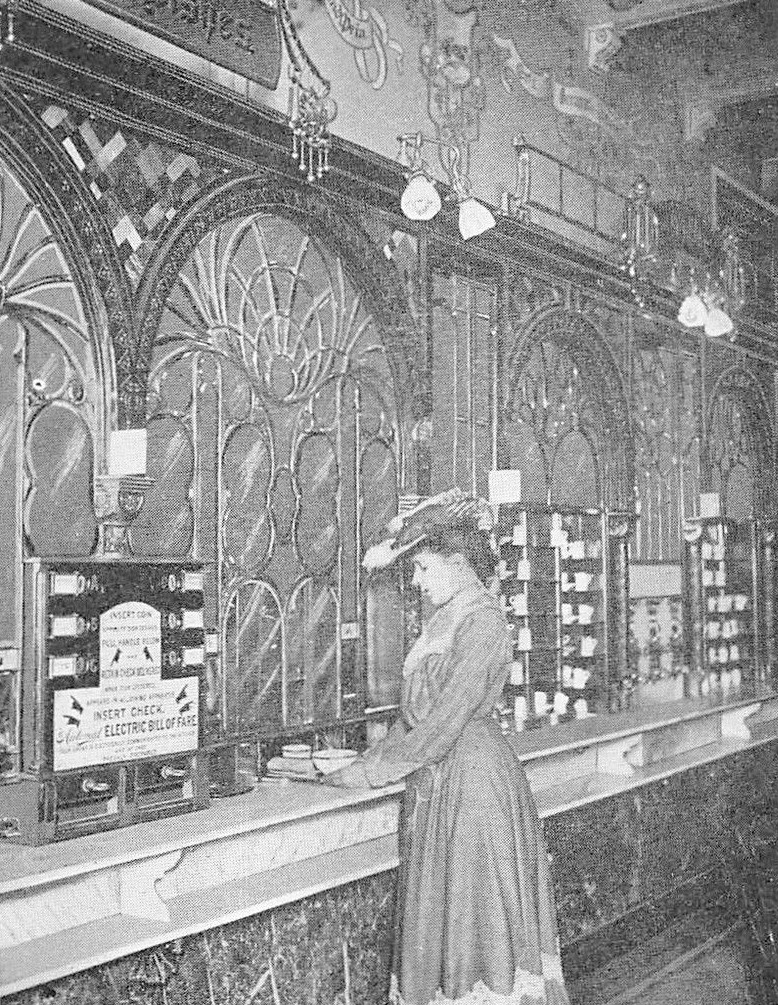
Postcard of a woman getting coffee at Horn & Hardart Automat on Broadway, New York City

- A dynamite explosion in Rancagua, Chile, killed 38 people.
- A riot broke out during a strike among lumber mill workers in Grabow, Louisiana, resulting in four deaths, fifty injuries, and a total 58 strikers arrested.
- The first Automat in New York City, providing fast food to customers in a self-service format, was opened by Horn & Hardart at 1557 Broadway in Times Square. Similar to a vending machine, the service featured foods prepared in a kitchen and then placed in windowed slots, which a diner could access by placing coins into a machine. The service had existed in Philadelphia since 1902.
- Magician and escape artist Harry Houdini performed his most dangerous stunt up to that time. In addition to his familiar act of having to escape being locked up in handcuffs and leg irons, Houdini was placed in a wooden box that was weighted down, nailed shut, and then thrown off of the tugboat Catherine Moran into the East River at New York City. A minute after the coffin sank, Houdini surfaced before hundreds of spectators, including reporters and photographers.
- Born: Gérard Lecointe, French army officer, final commander of colonial forces in French Algeria, recipitient of the Legion of Honour and National Order of Merit; in Poitiers, France (d. 2009)
- Died: William Howard Durham, 39, American theologian, advocate of the Finished Work in Pentecostalism, from pneumonia (b. 1873).

== July 8, 1912 (Monday) ==
- The Russian and Japanese Empires signed a secret treaty regarding the division of their interests in Inner Mongolia (now part of China), with Russia to have control of Mongol territory west of the longitude of Beijing (116°27'E) and Japan control of that to the east, while Outer Mongolia was to be under Russian control.
- The Portuguese city of Chaves was bombarded by rebels under the command of Captain Henrique Mitchell de Paiva Couceiro, seeking to restore the monarchy, until the city was rescued by government troops.
- Italian forces captured Misrata, which had provided a critical supply line for Ottoman forces in Libya. Ottoman forces suffered 500 dead and 500 wounded, while Italian forces had 23 killed and 112 wounded.
- The Ottoman Empire's Minister of War, Mahmud Shevket Pasha, resigned after the fall of Tripoli to Italian troops, and an uprising in the Krujë District in the Empire's Albanian territory.
- The 36th staging of the Wimbledon Championships wrapped with the following results:
  - Anthony Wilding of England won his third consecutive Wimbledon championship, defeating Arthur Gore in four sets of 6–4, 6–4, 4–6, 6–4.
  - Ethel Larcombe defeating Charlotte Sterry in two sets of 6–3, 6–1 to win her first and only women single's title.
  - Tennis pair Herbert Roper Barrett and Charles Dixon defeated Alfred Beamish and James Cecil Parke in five sets of 6–8, 6–4, 3–6, 6–3, 6–4 in the finals. They also challenged and defeated reigning men's double champions Max Decugis and André Gobert in the challenge round in four sets of 3–6, 6–3, 6–4, 7–5.
- At the 800 meter Olympic running competition, the world record of 1:52.8 seconds was broken by the first three finishers, with Ted Meredith of the United States winning in 1:51.9.
- Pitcher Rube Marquard's winning streak was halted at 19 consecutive games, as his New York Giants lost to the Chicago Cubs, 7–2. His record would still stand 100 years later.
- Died: Robert Barrett Browning, 63, English painter, and son of poets Robert Browning and Elizabeth Barrett Browning (b. 1849)

== July 9, 1912 (Tuesday) ==
- Seventy-seven English coal miners and three mine inspectors were killed in an explosion at a coal mine at Cadeby, South Yorkshire, England.

== July 10, 1912 (Wednesday) ==
- William Massey became the 19th Prime Minister of New Zealand after Thomas Mackenzie resigned and dissolved the Liberal Government of New Zealand, after losing to a vote of no confidence.
- The French Chamber of Deputies approved the Electoral Reform Bill, setting proportional representation within the Chamber, by a margin of 330–217.
- The German Army was sent to New Guinea on a punitive expedition against the natives who had killed their colonial representative.

== July 11, 1912 (Thursday) ==
- The Governor of Valença, Portugal was arrested on charges of aiding Royalist rebels.
- The United States House of Representatives voted 222–1 to impeach United States Commerce Court Judge Robert W. Archbald. The sole dissenting vote was from the Congressman from Archbald's district, John R. Farr of Pennsylvania.
- Inventor Elmer A. Sperry, founder of the Sperry Gyroscope Company, filed the patent application for the first aircraft stabilizer or autopilot, a means of keeping an airplane level and flying in a straight line at a fixed altitude while the pilot was temporarily away from the controls. "My idea is to provide a reference line," Sperry wrote, "or lane which is fixed in space so that it may be used to govern automatically the movements of a body, such as torpedoes, air craft or the like." U.S. Patent No. 1,186,856 was granted on June 13, 1916, giving the Sperry Company exclusive right to manufacture and sell the autopilot and its improvements until 1933.
- Saskatchewan Liberal leader Walter Scott, the first premier since the Canadian province was formed in 1905, was elected for a third time in provincial elections.
- Born:
  - Sergiu Celibidache, Romanian conductor, known for his collaborations with the Munich Philharmonic and Berlin Philharmonic, in Roman, Romania (d. 1996)
  - William F. Walsh, American politician, U.S. Representative of New York from 1973 to 1979, Mayor of Syracuse, New York from 1961 to 1969; in Syracuse, New York, United States (d. 2011)

== July 12, 1912 (Friday) ==
- Mexican rebels marched into Colonia Diaz, one of the American Mormon colonies in Mexico, and gave the American colonists there 24 hours to surrender all weapons. The colonists' senior official, Junius Romney, met with the rebels' leader and learned that the rebels planned to drive the Americans out.
- The city of Point Tupper, Nova Scotia, was destroyed by fire.
- Eugene W. Chafin was nominated for president by the Prohibition Party at its convention in Atlantic City, New Jersey. Chafin and his running mate, Aaron S. Watkins, had run on the ticket in 1908.
- Near the Persian city of Ardabil, a Russian military column consisting of a squadron of Cossacks and a few mountain artillery guns attacked a village supporting the former Shah. Eleven 'Shahaveens' or Shah supporters were killed with one Cossack a casualty on the Russian side.
- The full length silent film Les Amours de la reine Élisabeth, starring world-famous stage actress Sarah Bernhardt, was released in the United States as Queen Elizabeth, with title cards in English. Adolph Zukor, who would incorporate Paramount Pictures on May 8, 1914, launched his company as the distributor. Paramount would celebrate its centennial in 2012.
- Born:
  - Mick Mackey, Irish Gaelic football player, centre-forward for Limerick from 1929 to 1947; as Michael Mackey in Castleconnell, County Limerick, Ireland (d. 1982)
  - Petar Stambolić, Serbian state leader, Prime Minister of Yugoslavia 1963—1967, federation president 1982—1983; in Brezova, Ivanjica, Kingdom of Serbia (now Serbia) (d. 2007)
  - Nicolae Steinhardt, Romanian writer, author of The Happiness Diary, at Pantelimon, Romania (d. 1989)

== July 13, 1912 (Saturday) ==
- The United States Senate voted 55–28 to remove William Lorimer from his post as U.S. Senator from Illinois, after determining that his election by the Illinois Senate had been secured by corruption. Lorimer would earn what a U.S. Senate historian called "the dubious distinction of being the last senator to be deprived of office for corrupting a state legislature."
- Dr. Théodore Tuffier, a surgeon in France, performed the first successful surgery for aortic stenosis on a human patient, an unidentified man from Belgium. The operation went so well that the man was able to return home twelve days later, and was still doing well eight years later. The next procedure to treat narrowing of the aortic valve did not take place again until 36 years later.
- The weekly newspaper Al-Hilal, published by Indian Muslim activist Abul Kalam Azad to persuade Urdu-speaking Muslims to join in the move to gain independence from the United Kingdom, made its first appearance.

== July 14, 1912 (Sunday) ==
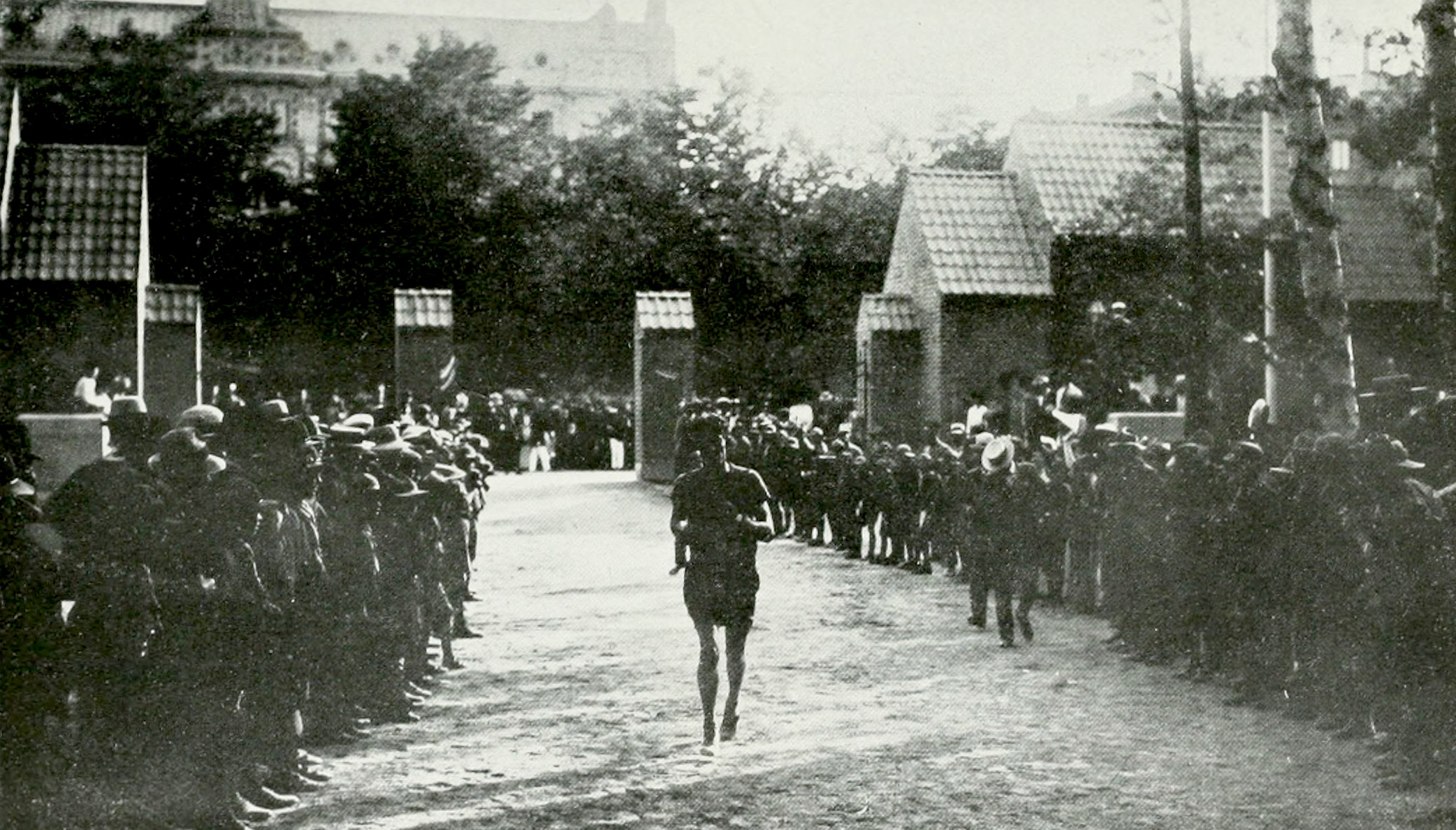
July 14, 1912: Ken McArthur at the entrance to Stockholm Olympic Stadium.

- Ken McArthur, a policeman from Johannesburg, South Africa, won the Olympic marathon in 2 hours and 36 minutes. Francisco Lázaro of Portugal became the first athlete to die in the modern Olympics, collapsing in the heat during the race and dying the next day.
- The Alliance-Sebring Twins minor baseball club for Sebring and Alliance, Ohio, disbanded after the players went on strike over pay, leading to the eventual dissolving of the Ohio–Pennsylvania League.
- A railroad accident near Chicago, the third major American railroad crash in two weeks, killed 15 people and injured 30. The Denver Overland Limited, eastbound to Chicago, was idled at Western Springs, Illinois, when it was struck at 70 miles an hour by a mail train traveling to Omaha, Nebraska.
- Born:
  - Northrop Frye, Canadian literary critic, author of Fearful Symmetry and Anatomy of Criticism; as Herman Northrop Frye in Sherbrooke, Quebec, Canada (d. 1991)
  - Woody Guthrie, American musician, known for his folk music songs including "This Land Is Your Land"; as Woodrow Wilson Guthrie in Okemah, Oklahoma (d. 1967)

== July 15, 1912 (Monday) ==
- Commonwealth Bank, founded by the Australian government and now one of the largest multinational corporations in Australia, opened for business. Prime Minister Andrew Fisher opened the first account at the bank.
- A vote of confidence in the Turkish government passed 194–4.
- The National Insurance Act took effect in the United Kingdom. The original Act provided sickness, disability and maternity benefits and free treatment for tuberculosis for all insured workers, but not for their dependents.
- The Bank of Wilmington and Brandywine merged with Wilmington Trust in Wilmington, Delaware, to become the largest bank on the Atlantic Coast states of the U.S.

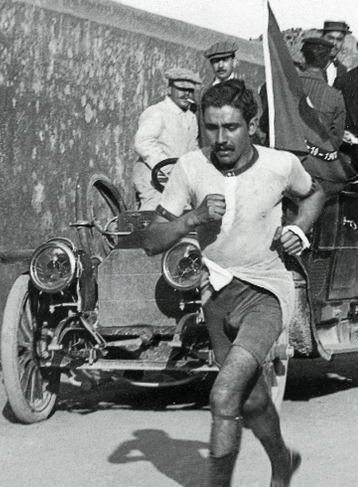
Lázaro in his final race

- Died: Francisco Lázaro, 24, Portuguese Olympic athlete, died one day after collapsing from hyperthermia while running in the marathon at the Olympics in Stockholm, becoming the first casualty of the modern Olympic games. Lazaro had covered large portions of his body with grease to prevent sunburn, but overheated and was unable to perspire, creating a fatal electrolyte imbalance. He fell after running 30 kilometres (19 mi) of the 42.195 kilometres (26.219 mi) race, as his body temperature climbed to 41 °C (106 °F). (b. 1888)

== July 16, 1912 (Tuesday) ==
- Hurshid Pasha, who had temporarily become the Ottoman Empire's Minister of War, resigned as problems continued in Albania, which presented its grievances to the Grand Vizier. He was replaced by General Mahmud Mukhtar.
- Sir Percy Girouard resigned as the Governor of the East Africa Protectorate in what is now Kenya to go into business with a shipbuilding firm. He was succeeded by Henry Conway Belfield.
- Herman Rosenthal, New York City gambler, was shot to death by four gunmen, hours before he was scheduled to testify before a grand jury on police corruption. The killing, carried out by hired gangsters, would be traced to New York City Police Department lieutenant Charles Becker. The four shooters, and Lt. Becker, would later be convicted for the murder and executed.

== July 17, 1912 (Wednesday) ==
- The Free State of Ikaria was declared on the small island near the coast of Turkey, as its predominantly Greek inhabitants broke away from the Ottoman Empire. It would retain independence until November 1, when it would be taken by the Kingdom of Greece.
- Ottoman Grand Vizier Mehmed Said Pasha resigned along with his cabinet, after a revolt in the Turkish Army against the Young Turks organization.
- The United States House of Representatives voted in favor of splitting the United States Department of Commerce and Labor into two different departments.
- Born: Art Linkletter, Canadian-born American television host known for the comedy radio and television series House Party and People Are Funny; as Arthur Gordon Kelly, in Moose Jaw, Saskatchewan, Canada (d. 2010)
- Died: Henri Poincaré, 58, French mathematician, known for his research into deterministic systems that lead to the development of chaos theory (b. 1854)

== July 18, 1912 (Thursday) ==
- Ahmet Tevfik Pasha was appointed as the new Grand Vizier of the Ottoman Empire, by Sultan Hamid, but would be unable to form a cabinet.
- General Pedro Ivonnet, who took command of negro rebels in Cuba, was found and killed by government troops at Nueva Escocia. The other major rebel leader, General Julio Antomarchi, surrendered later in the day at El Cobre.
- Born: Max Rousié, French rugby player, captain of France national rugby league team from 1938 to 1939; in Marmande, Lot-et-Garonne département (killed in auto accident, 1959)

== July 19, 1912 (Friday) ==
- In the Italo-Turkish War, Turkish defenders sank two Italian torpedo boats with cannon fire after a fleet of eight Italian boats attempted to block the entrance to the Dardanelles.
- Albanian rebels agreed to a truce with Ottoman troops, after the Ottoman government agreed to send a commission of Parliament to investigate grievances in the Ottoman province.
- A large meteorite streaked over the town of Holbrook, Arizona, at 6:30 pm local time, and then exploded, showering an area six miles eastward with more than 15,000 pieces. Based on the fragments recovered, the meteor was estimated to weigh more than 400 pounds.

== July 20, 1912 (Saturday) ==
- Zapatista rebels attacked a train between Mexico City and Cuernavaca, killing 60 people and wounding many.
- The National Packing Company, informally referred to as the "Meat Trust," was dissolved after being found to have violated American anti-trust laws. The assets of the company were divided among the three companies that had merged in 1902 to create National Packing: Swift & Company, Armour and Company and Morris & Company.
- American chess player Frank Marshall beat Russian chess master Stepan Levitsky in Breslau, Germany.
- Died:
  - Robert F. Boyd, 54, American physician, first president of the National Medical Association (b. 1855)
  - Andrew Lang, 68, Scottish literary critic and writer, best known for his research into folklore and fairy tales introduced through the Lang's Fairy Books series (b. 1844)

== July 21, 1912 (Sunday) ==
- Ahmed Muhtar Pasha was appointed as the new Grand Vizier of the Ottoman Empire, after the Sultan declined to accede to the demand by Ahmet Tevfik Pasha to dissolve the Chamber of Deputies.
- Portuguese colonial forces defeated the last of the rebels in East Timor, with 3,000 Timorese killed or wounded, and another 4,000 captured.
- Born:
  - Tommy Butler, British law enforcer, chief superintendent of the Metropolitan Police during the Great Train Robbery investigation in 1963; in Fulham, London, England (d. 1970)
  - Karl Deutsch, Czech-American philosopher who coined the terms "deutocracy" and "cyberdeutocracy" to describe autocratic regimes that control using mass and cyber communications; in Prague, Bohemia, Austria-Hungary (now Prague, Czech Republic) (d. 1992)

== July 22, 1912 (Monday) ==
- Under threat of impeachment, United States District Judge Cornelius H. Hanford of Seattle voluntarily resigned his office. Hanford had been the first federal judge for Washington, appointed in 1890.

== July 23, 1912 (Tuesday) ==
- The first automatic telephone exchange in the United Kingdom, replacing human operators on switchboards, was inaugurated in London by the General Post Office with a system capable of handling 1,500 lines.

== July 24, 1912 (Wednesday) ==
- An earthquake measuring 7.0 in magnitude rocked the Piura region in Peru, killing 101 people.
- The First International Congress on Eugenics convened in London, with 400 delegates from twelve nations. Major Leonard Darwin, one of the sons of Charles Darwin, presided over the Congress, and told delegates that "The unfit amongst men are now no longer necessarily killed off by hunger and disease, but are cherished with care, thus being enabled to reproduce their kind, however bad that may be... the effect likely to be produced by our charity on future generations is, to say the least, but weakness and folly."
- The United States Senate approved creation of a territorial legislature for Alaska, a single chamber of 16 members. The bill would be signed into law on August 24.
- Died: Emma Cons, 74, British activist, early promoter of women's suffrage, theater manager of The Old Vic in London (b. 1838)

== July 25, 1912 (Thursday) ==
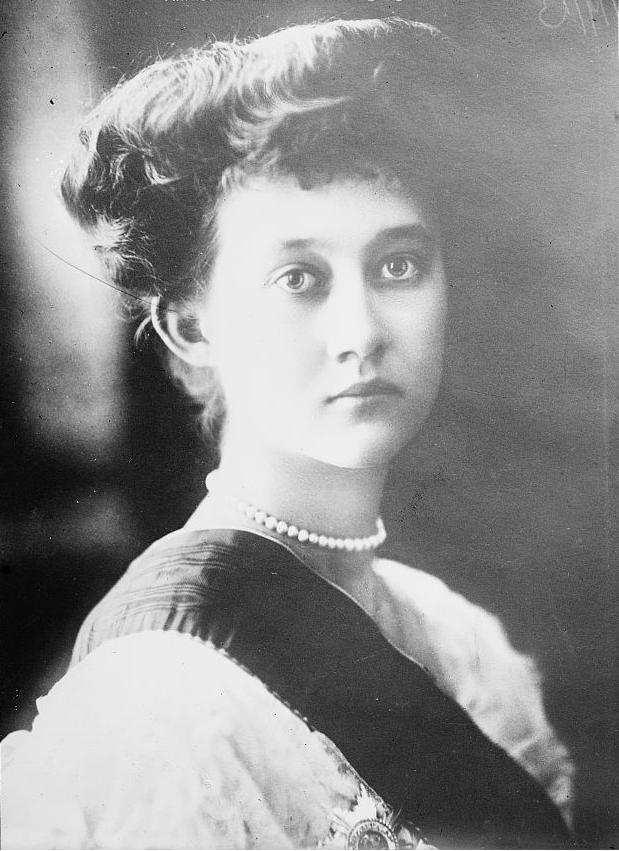
Grand Duchess Marie-Adelaide

- Marie-Adélaïde, Grand Duchess of Luxembourg, was formally enthroned, five months after the death of her father William, and six weeks after her 18th birthday.
- With the Negro Rebellion over in Cuba, the U.S. Marines at Guantánamo were ordered to return home.

== July 26, 1912 (Friday) ==
- Creation of a naval wing of the British Royal Flying Corps was approved in Council.
- The first radio communication between a U.S. Navy airplane and a ship (the torpedo boat USS Stringham) took place, with the Stringham and the plane three miles apart.
- France became the first country to use national markings on military aircraft other than a flag, by a decree requiring military aircraft to display the manufacturer, serial number, and the maximum load and roundels on the fuselage and wings.
- Charles Stileman was consecrated as the first Anglican Bishop for Persia (now the Islamic Republic of Iran).
- Edward J. Flanagan, 26, was ordained as a priest of the Catholic Church after completing his studies at the University of Innsbruck in Austria. The Irish native returned to his home in Omaha, Nebraska, where he had worked as a meatpacker, and would establish the Boys Town orphanage in 1921.
- The first serial film was released to American theaters. Each week, a new one-reel episode of the 12 part series, What Happened to Mary, was shown to moviegoers. Starring Mary Fuller, the serial was the creation of Edison Studios.
- Born:
  - Buddy Clark, American singer, most famous for the duet with Dinah Shore, Baby, It's Cold Outside; as Samuel Goldberg in Boston, Massachusetts, United States (killed in plane crash, 1949)
  - Qigong, Chinese artist, known for his work in Chinese calligraphy; in Beijing, Republic of China (now China) (d. 2005)

== July 27, 1912 (Saturday) ==
- Evacuation of American women and children from the four Mormon colonies in Mexico at Chihuahua state, was ordered by senior Mormon official, Junius Romney. In all, there were 4,000 Americans in twelve colonies.
- Bonar Law, conservative Leader of the Opposition in the Parliament of the United Kingdom, declared in a speech that, "We regard the Government as a revolutionary committee which has seized by fraud upon domestic power... We shall use any means to deprive them of the power which they have usurped and to compel them to face the people they have deceived."
- The Turkish cabinet announced that it would investigate the grievances of its citizens in Northern Albania and that armed force would not be used against them.
- Elise Sem became the first female barrister in Norway.
- Born:
  - Cheikh Raymond, Algerian musician, noted performer of the oud with a fan base of Jewish and Muslim groups; as Raymond Leyris in Batna, French Algeria (now Algeria) (assassinated, 1961)
  - Ben Carlin, Australian explorer who completed the first circumnavigation using an amphibious vehicle; as Frederick Benjamin Carlin in Northam, Western Australia, Australia (d. 1981)

== July 28, 1912 (Sunday) ==
- A pier on Germany's largest island, Rügen, collapsed under the weight of 1,000 people who were waiting for the arrival of the cruise ship Kronprinz Wilhelm. One hundred people went down into the Baltic Sea, and at least 14 drowned. The accident led to the creation of the German Life Saving Association.
- The Turkish Parliamentary Commission of Enquiry arrived in Pristina to investigate Albanian complaints.
- Belgian cyclist Odile Defraye won the 10th Tour de France.
- Born: George Cisar, American actor, best known for his television roles including the 1950s sitcom Dennis the Menace; in Cicero, Illinois, United States (d. 1979)
- Died: Henry Sutton, 56, Australian engineer, known for his development of wireless telegraphy (b. 1855)

== July 29, 1912 (Monday) ==
- Nicaragua's Minister of War, General Luis Mena, brought rebel troops into the capital, Managua, in an attempt to overthrow President Adolfo Díaz. The Diaz government was saved by a request for intervention by the U.S. Marines.
- An assassination attempt was made against Hassam Bey, leader of the Albanian rebellion against the Ottoman Empire, while he was in Uskub (now Skopje, North Macedonia).
- The first National Conference of American Newspaper and Magazine Writers opened at Madison, Wisconsin.
- Born: Clarence Jordan, American activist, co-founder of Koinonia Farm (later the Koinonia Partners), which established Habitat for Humanity in 1976; in Talbotton, Georgia, United States (d. 1969)

== July 30, 1912 (Tuesday) ==
- The Emperor Meiji, also called Mutsuhito, died at 12:43 am after a 44-year reign as Emperor of Japan, during which the nation rose from isolationism to become a world power. Crown Prince Yoshihito of Japan was proclaimed as the Emperor Taishō after the death of his father. In Japanese history, the event marked the end of the Meiji era and the beginning of the Taishō era.
- The report of the British Court of Inquiry on the sinking of the Titanic, signed by the Chairman Lord Mersey, was presented to British Parliament after hearing testimony from 97 witnesses over 38 days. The Court concluded that the cause of the disaster "was due to collision with an iceberg, brought about by the excessive speed at which the ship was being navigated." On the same day, the first of the 710 Titanic survivors died, 21-month-old Mary Nakid, of meningitis. Millvina Dean, 16 months younger, would be the last survivor, dying on May 31, 2009.
- The ministry of the Ottoman Grand Vizier Ahmed Muhtar Pasha survived a vote of confidence by a margin of 113–95.
- Died: Juan Gualberto González, 61, President of Paraguay from 1890 to 1894 (b. 1851)

== July 31, 1912 (Wednesday) ==
- The Sims Act was signed into law by U.S. President William Howard Taft, prohibiting the interstate transportation of "films or other pictorial representations of prize fights."
- Albanian delegates at Pristina demanded the dissolution of the Turkish Chamber of Deputies.
- The United States Navy tested an aircraft catapult for the first time using a prototype on shore, but proved a failure as the aircraft was badly damaged during the test.
- Born:
  - Bill Brown, Australian cricketer, opening batsman for the Australia national cricket team from 1934 to 1948; in Toowoomba, Queensland, Australia (d. 2008)
  - Milton Friedman, American economist, leading member of the Chicago school of economics, recipient of the Nobel Memorial Prize in Economic Sciences; in New York City, United States (d. 2006)
  - Irv Kupcinet, American journalist, best known for his column in the Chicago Sun-Times; in the Chicago, Illinois, United States (d. 2003)
- Died: Allan Octavian Hume, 83, British public servant and activist, founder of the Indian National Congress (b. 1829)
