= August 1912 =

Month of 1912

<<	August 1912					>>
Su	Mo	Tu	We	Th	Fr	Sa
				1	2	3
4	5	6	7	8	9	10
11	12	13	14	15	16	17
18	19	20	21	22	23	24
25	26	27	28	29	30	31

The following events occurred in August 1912:

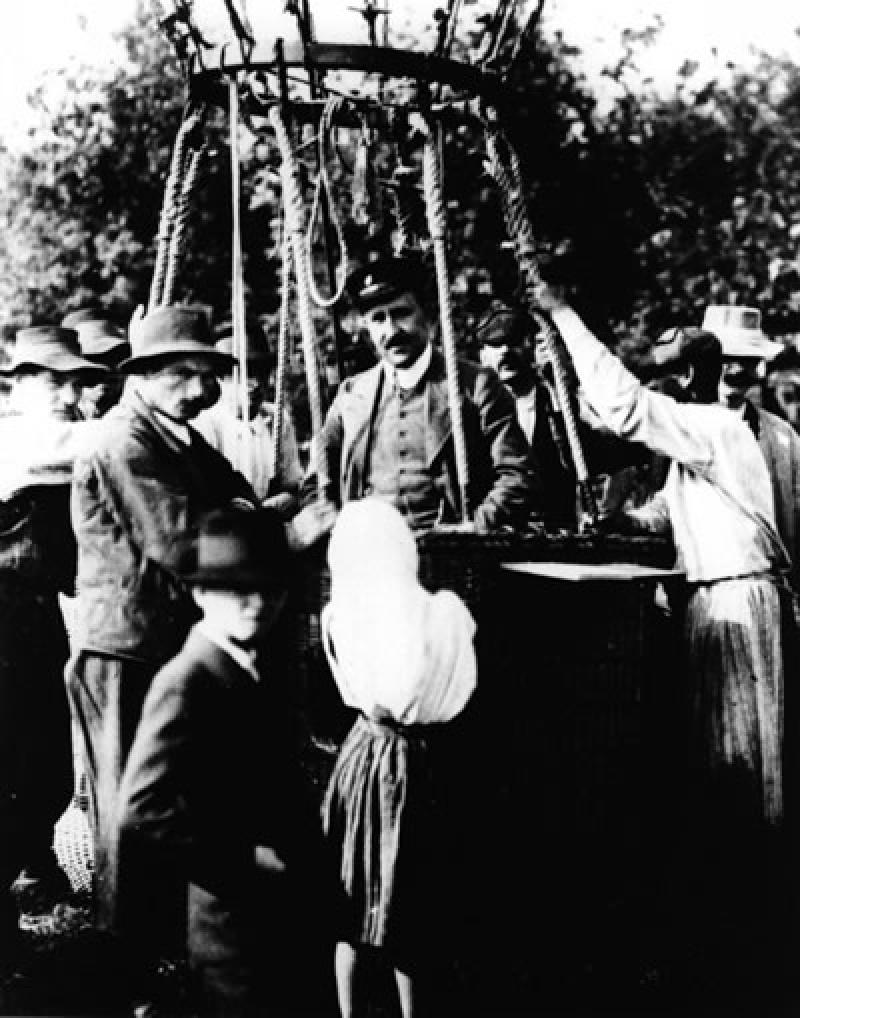
August 7, 1912: Victor Hess (center) discovers cosmic rays

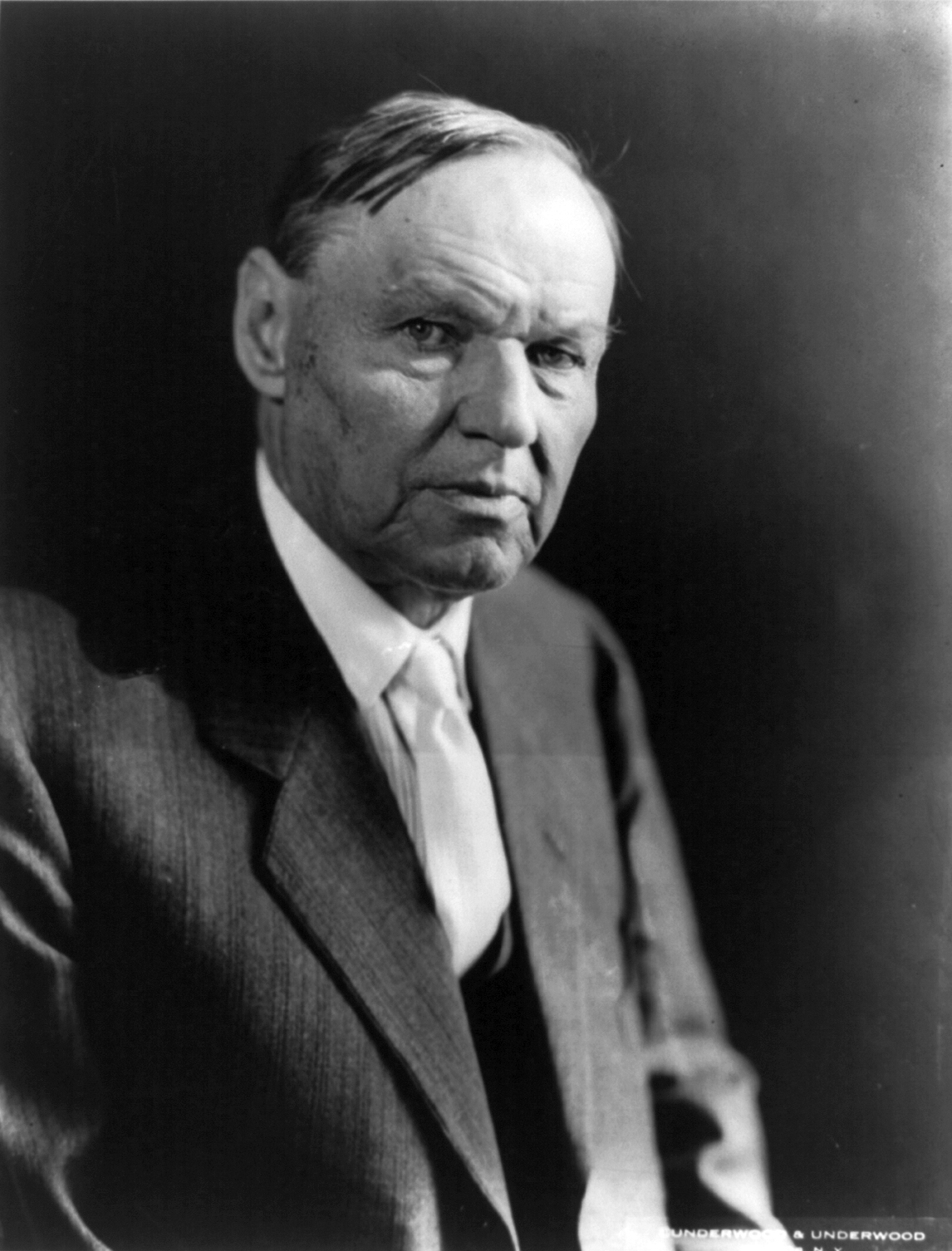
August 17, 1912: Legendary lawyer Clarence Darrow acquitted of criminal charges

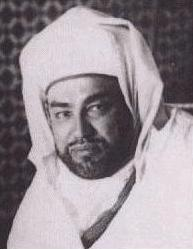
August 12, 1912: Yusuf becomes new Sultan of Morocco as brother flees

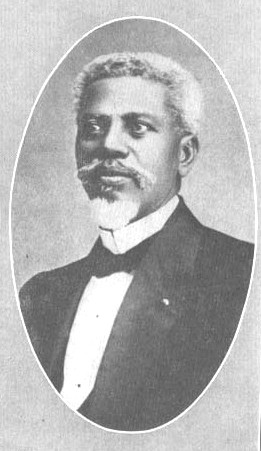
August 8, 1912: Haiti's President Leconte killed in accidental explosion

== August 1, 1912 (Thursday) ==
- The Yuaikai, later called the Nihon Rōdō Sodomei or Japan Federation of Labor, was founded by Bunji Suzuki. At its peak, it would have 100,000 workers in its ranks.
- The Jungfrau Railway was inaugurated with the opening of underground Jungfraujoch railway station in Bernese Oberland, Switzerland.
- A rail line of 24 miles 49 chains (39.6 kilometres) in length opened between Malenge and Franklin, Cape, South Africa.
- A train accident at Rio de Janeiro killed 10 people and injured 50.

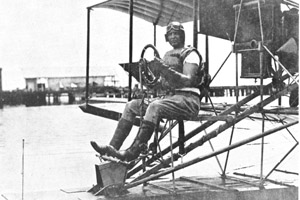
Alfred Cunningham USMC

- Alfred A. Cunningham of the United States Marine Corps made his first solo flight, after 2 hours and 40 minutes of instruction, of an airplane, becoming the first U.S. Marine pilot.
- The Progressive Party announced that it would not allow African Americans from Southern states to be delegates at its organizing convention in Chicago, with the approval of former U.S. President Theodore Roosevelt. Roosevelt emphasized that from Northern states, "there would be a number of negro delegates; more, in fact, than ever before figured in a National convention."
- Golfer John McDermott successfully defended his championship title at the 18th U.S. Open, beating runner-up Tom McNamara by two strokes.
- Born:
  - David Brand, Australian politician, 19th Premier of Western Australia; in Dongara, Western Australia (d. 1979)
  - Frank K. Edmondson, American astronomer, established the Indiana Asteroid Program; in Milwaukee, Wisconsin, (d. 2008)

== August 2, 1912 (Friday) ==
- Chinese soldiers routed Tibetans at Lhasa.
- The throwing of a bomb in the Ottoman Empire city of Kotschana (now Kočani, North Macedonia) led to a riot by the residents there, with 140 people killed by Turkish soldiers who suppressed it. Eleven people died when a bomb went off in the town square, followed a few minutes later by another fatal attack.
- Competition for new aircraft models that met the requirements of the newly formed Royal Flying Corps began on the Salisbury Plain near Larkhill, England. Samuel Franklin Cody won the competition, which attracted 32 entrants, with his Cody V biplane.
- The United States Senate voted 51–4 to extend the Monroe Doctrine to protect the Americas from foreign corporations.
- The gunboat USS Tacoma was ordered to proceed from Guantánamo to Bluefields, Nicaragua.

== August 3, 1912 (Saturday) ==
- An attack by soldiers of Montenegro against a Turkish border post killed 30 Turks and 12 Montenegrins.
- "Baby Seals Blues" was published in the form of sheet music; according to historian Rudi Blesh, the song by Arthur "Baby" Seales was the first blues song to use the word "blues" in its title, with "Dallas Blues" appearing the next month on September 28, while other sources describe "Dallas Blues" as having been introduced in March 1912.

== August 4, 1912 (Sunday) ==
- Turkey's Senate voted to give the sultan power to dissolve parliament, after which it was dissolved with a vote of no confidence.
- Mount Etna erupted in Sicily.
- Nine members of an English boy scout troop, between the ages of 11 and 14, drowned along with their scoutmaster, when their boat capsized in the sea near the Isle of Sheppey, off the coast of the county of Kent. Britain mourned the deaths of the scouts as a national tragedy, and then First Lord of the Admiralty Winston Churchill had the destroyer HMS Fervent bring their flag-draped coffins to London for the funeral.
- One hundred U.S. Marines and Navy men on the USS Annapolis landed at Corinto, Nicaragua, to protect American interests, while the USS Tacoma arrived at Bluefields on Tuesday. The forces assisted in the defeat, on September 24, of the rebel forces led by General Luis Mena.
- Born:
  - Aleksandr Danilovich Aleksandrov, Soviet mathematician, known for his theorems including the Alexandrov's uniqueness theorem; in Volyn, Ryazan Governorate, Russian Empire (d. 1999)
  - Virgilio Piñera, Cuban writer, known for his short story collection Cold Tales and novels such as René's Flesh and Pressures and Diamonds; in Cárdenas (d. 1979)
  - Jandhyala Papayya Sastry, Indian poet, known for works including Pushpa Vilapam and Kunthi Kumari; in Kommuru village, Guntur district, Madras Presidency, British India (now Andhra Pradesh state in, India) (d. 1992)
  - Raoul Wallenberg, Swedish diplomat, credited for rescuing tens of thousands of Hungarian Jews during The Holocaust, before being taken captive by the Soviets during the Siege of Budapest; in Lidingö Municipality (disappeared, 1945; reported death, 1947)

== August 5, 1912 (Monday) ==
- In Chicago, the Progressive Party, nicknamed the "Bull Moose" Party to rival the Republican elephant and Democrat donkey, called itself to order as its founding convention opened at noon.
- Born: Abbé Pierre, French clergy, founder of Emmaus, recipient of the Legion of Honour; in Lyon, Rhone departement (d. 2007)

== August 6, 1912 (Tuesday) ==
- U.S. President William Howard Taft asked the United States Congress to fix maximum tolls for the Panama Canal.
- Theodore Roosevelt announced his 1912 platform at the Chicago convention of the Progressive Party.
- The Manistee Watch Company sold off all of its property, assets and machinery at auction following its closure in Manistee, Michigan. It had produced around 60,000 pocket watches in its three-year existence.

== August 7, 1912 (Wednesday) ==
- Russian composer Sergei Prokofiev first performed his Piano Concerto No. 1 for the public in Moscow.
- Physicist Victor Francis Hess, of the Institute for Radium Research in Vienna, became the first person to discover cosmic rays. Hoping to build upon the research of Theodor Wulf, who had found that radioactive emission from Earth decreased measurably at higher altitudes, Hess sought to measure the decrease by venturing to greater heights in a balloon. On his seventh flight, he lifted off with a pilot and a meteorologist from Aussig (now Ústí nad Labem in the Czech Republic). To his surprise, the electroscopes on his balloon began measuring an increase in radiation at 5,350 feet (1,630 m), after a steady decrease during the ascent, and at 15,000 feet (4,600 m) the amount doubled, showing that penetrating radiation was entering the atmosphere from a source other than the Sun. Hess called the rays Höhenstrahlung, or radiation from above.
- Woodrow Wilson accepted the Democratic nomination for president, which had offered the previous month at the convention in Baltimore. The New Jersey Governor spoke at his home in Sea Girt, New Jersey, before a group of other Democrats who were state governors, and a crowd of 6,000 supporters. New technology was used to capture the moment on phonographic records and films, so that American voters could see and hear the candidate.
- The Progressive Party nominated Theodore Roosevelt as its candidate for President of the United States and California Governor Hiram Johnson for vice-president.
- Three employees of the Union American Cigar Company at 28th and Smallman in Pittsburgh were killed, and 12 seriously injured, after a 24-ton water tank fell through the roof and the sixth floor, then into the fifth.
- Born: Võ Chí Công, Vietnamese state leader, third President of Vietnam; in Quảng Nam Province, French Indochina (now Vietnam) (d. 2011)
- Died: François-Alphonse Forel, 71, Swiss biologist, credited for the creation of limnology, the study of the ecology of freshwater lakes (b. 1841)

== August 8, 1912 (Thursday) ==
- A mine explosion in the village of Gerthe, in the Westphalia region of Germany, killed 103 men at the Lothringen Coal Company.
- Friederich Krupp AG, the Krupp family armaments company, celebrated its centennial with the Kaiser giving the address. Accompanying the Kaiser to the ceremony at Essen were the Chancellor and many of his cabinet, and Prince Henry.

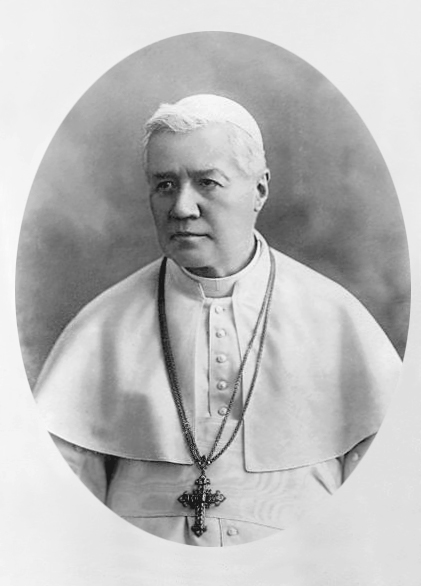
Pope Pius X

- Pope Pius X issued an encyclical about abuse of the indigenous tribes in the Putumayo region of Peru.
- Cincinnatus Leconte, President of Haiti, was killed in an accidental explosion at the presidential palace in Port-au-Prince. The President shared his residence with an arsenal of gunpowder in the basement, and the first blast occurred after an early morning fire had started. The legislature named General Tancrède Auguste as the new president that afternoon.
- Born: B. V. Raman, Indian astrologer, promoter of modern Hindu astrology; in Bangalore, Mysore princely state, British India (now Bangaluru in Karnataka state of India) (d. 1998)
- Died: Ross Winn, 40, American publisher, known for his work with the anarchist magazine Free Society (b. 1871)

== August 9, 1912 (Friday) ==
- An earthquake in Turkey near the Dardanelles killed 3,000 people, and injured another 1,575. There was a total destruction of the towns of Şarköy and Çorlu, and 300 dead in Mürefte (formerly Myriophyton) and 80 in Ganos-Hora. Çorlu was consumed by fire, reportedly by a lantern being toppled by the quake. In total, 5,540 homes were destroyed.
- Kosovo Albanian rebel leaders presented a list of 14 demands to one of the viziers of the Ottoman Empire. The Turkish leadership would agree to most of the proposals.
- The Panama Canal bill passed the United States Senate 47–15.
- Born:
  - Anne Brown, American opera singer, first singer to portray "Bess" in the opera Porgy and Bess; in Baltimore, Maryland (d. 2009)
  - Alex Stevenson, Irish association football player, forward for Everton from 1934 to 1949, and the Republic of Ireland national football team from 1932 to 1948; in Dublin (d. 1985)
- Died: Candida Maria of Jesus, 67, Spanish clergy, founder of the Hijas de Jesús, canonized as a saint in 2010 (b. 1845)

== August 10, 1912 (Saturday) ==
- The Republic of China's provisional government enacted its election law, creating a lower house of parliament, and limiting voting rights to male citizens who were at least 21, had two years residency in their district, and met property and educational restrictions.
- Frank McClean flew a Short Brothers floatplane up the River Thames between the upper and lower parts of Tower Bridge and underneath London Bridge.
- English author Adeline Virginia Stephen married author Leonard Woolf to become Virginia Woolf.
- The Sharon Giants minor baseball team moved to Bridgeport, Ohio to finish off its final season with Ohio–Pennsylvania League, which broke apart afterward.
- Born:
  - Jorge Amado, Brazilian writer, author of Dona Flor and Her Two Husbands; in Itabuna, Bahia state, Brazil] (d. 2001)
  - Romain Maes, Belgian cyclist, winner of the 1935 Tour de France; in Zerkegem(d. 1983)
- Died: Paul Wallot, German architect, designer for the Reichstag building in Berlin (b. 1841)

== August 11, 1912 (Sunday) ==
- An attack by Zapatista rebels on a train near Mexico City killed 35 soldiers and 20 civilians.

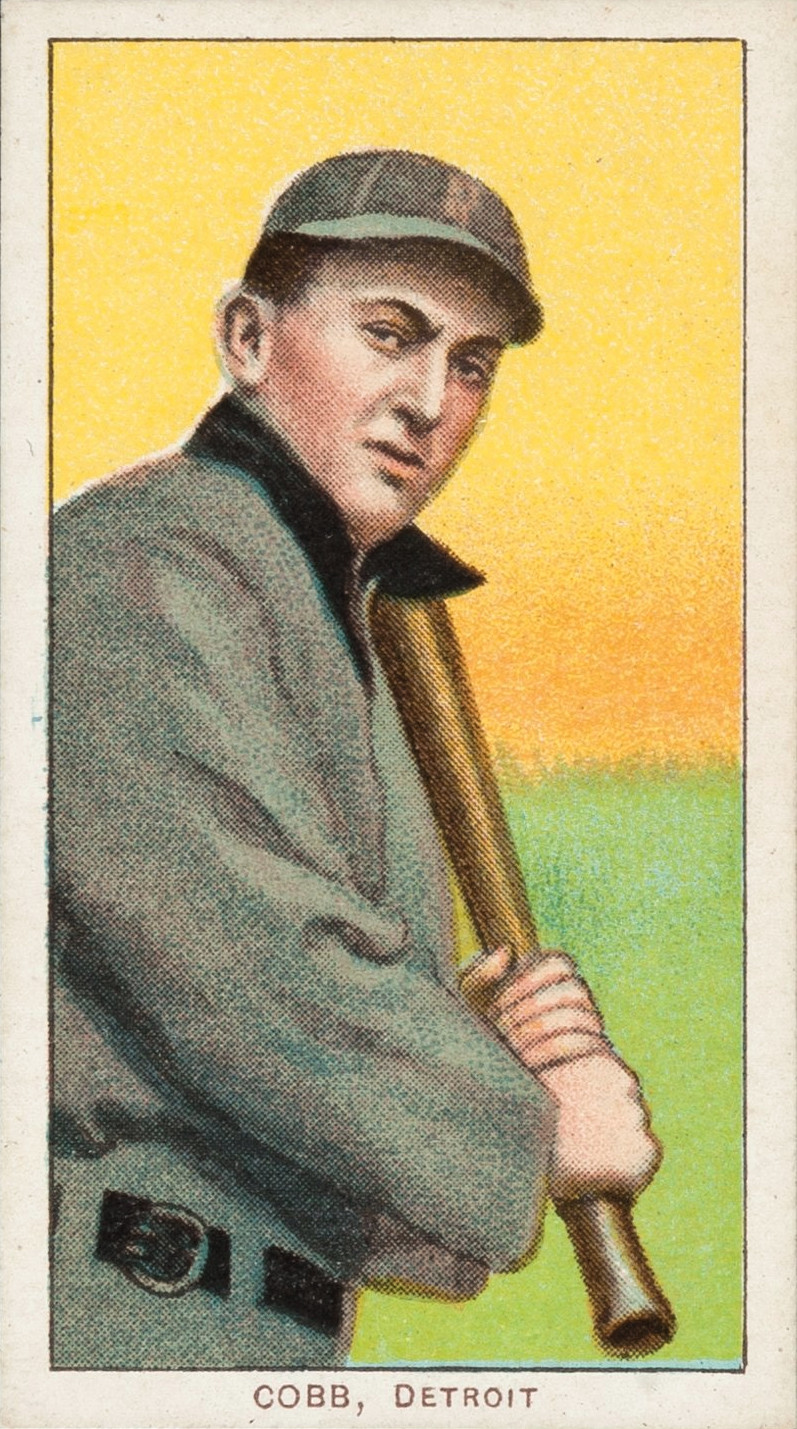
Ty Cobb

- Major league baseball star Ty Cobb was in Detroit when he was jumped by three hoodlums while on his way to catch a train to Syracuse, New York, to appear for the Detroit Tigers in an exhibition game against the minor league Syracuse Stars, and cut on the back by a knife. He played the next day while wearing "a blood-soaked, makeshift bandage," and would later tell biographer Al Stump that he had beaten one of his attackers to death. However, lawyer and baseball fan Doug Roberts researched coroner records and press reports, and found no record of a body being found with head trauma during the summer of 1912, nor of mention in the Detroit newspapers, although Cobb was treated for an 0.5-inch (13 mm) long knife wound.
- Born:
  - Howard Lee Hale, American farmer with polio who lived in an iron lung for 32 years, from 1944 until his death in 1976; in Wythe County, Virginia. He was considered to be the longest surviving iron lung patient until 2022, when Paul Alexander was given the title by Guinness World Records after living in an iron lung for 71 years.
  - Norman Levinson, American mathematician, known for his research field including number theory and differential equations, author of On the Non-Vanishing of a Function; in Lynn, Massachusetts, United States (d. 1975)

== August 12, 1912 (Monday) ==
- A military aviation branch was created for the Imperial Russian Army, beginning what would become the Soviet Air Forces.
- An army of 15,000 Kosovar Albanians marched on the Üskub (now Skopje in North Macedonia), at the time one of the European outposts of the Ottoman Empire, and expelled the Turkish administrators and Serbian residents there. Serbia sent troops in response, retaking the city and driving out the remaining Ottomans from Macedonia after the Battle of Kumanovo on October 23.
- Sultan Mulay Hafid, who signed the agreement to place Morocco under French control, abdicated his throne, in favor of his younger brother, Mulay Yusuf.
- A record seven convicts were put to death in the electric chair at Sing Sing, the New York penitentiary at Ossining, New York, in the space of a little more than an hour, with the first being executed at 5:09 am and the last at 6:14 am. Five were Italian-Americans who had burglarized a house at Griffin's Corners, New York in November, during which a sixth man, Santo Zanzara, had stabbed an occupant to death. Zanzara had been executed earlier, and the other five were put to death as accessories.
- Keystone Studios was formed by filmmaker Mack Sennett, producing comedies, most notably those that featured the Keystone Cops.
- The drama Fine Feathers by Eugene Walter opened at the Cort Theatre in Chicago.
- Born:
  - Samuel Fuller, American film director and screenwriter, known for films including Shock Corridor, The Naked Kiss, and The Big Red One; in Worcester, Massachusetts (d. 1997)
  - Rex Griffin, American country musician, known for hit country songs "Everybody's Trying to Be My Baby" and "The Last Letter"; as Alsie Griffin, in Gadsden, Alabama (d. 1959)

== August 13, 1912 (Tuesday) ==
- Pilot Simeon Petrov became the first to fly an airplane over Bulgaria. He had been part of a program where 13 army officers were trained abroad, leading to the eventual formation of the Bulgarian Air Force.
- The Radio Act was enacted, providing for all American radio broadcasters to be licensed by, and assigned a specific frequency, by the United States government.
- Zapatistas captured the city of Ixtapa, Mexico after killing 200 government troops.
- Born:
  - Ben Hogan, American golfer, fourth all-time PGA Tour winner, winner of nine major championships including the Masters, PGA, U.S. Open, and The Open Championship; as William Ben Hogan, in Stephenville, Texas (d. 1997)
  - Salvador Luria, Italian-born American microbiologist, recipient of the Nobel Prize in Physiology or Medicine for his research into bacteriophages; in Turin (d. 1991)
- Died:
  - Horace Howard Furness, 80, American literary critic, noted researcher into William Shakespeare (b. 1833)
  - Jules Massenet, 70, French composer, best known for his operas Manon and Werther (b. 1842)

== August 14, 1912 (Wednesday) ==
- Concessions to the rebels temporarily ended the Khost Rebellion in Afghanistan.
- Born: John Astor, American business leader, heir to the Astor family fortune; in Miami Beach, Florida (d. 1992)
- Died: Octavia Hill, 73, British activist, founder of the Charity Organization Society (now Family Action) (b. 1838)

== August 15, 1912 (Thursday) ==
- Japan began its first taxi service, with the founding of the Takushi jidosha kabushiki kaisha, serving the Ginza and train stations in Tokyo.
- Belgian lawyer Jules Destrée published an open letter to King Albert calling for the separation of the regions of Flanders and Wallonia from Belgium, laying the groundwork for the Walloon Movement.
- Eduardo Schaerer was sworn into office as the 26th President of Paraguay and would serve a full four-year term.
- Born:
  - Julia Child, American chef and television personality, author of Mastering the Art of French Cooking, host of the 1960s cooking television show The French Chef; in Pasadena, California (d. 2004)
  - Amir Khan, Indian singer, credited as founder of Indore gharana used in Indian classical music; as Ustad Amir Khan, in Indore, British India (now India) (d. 1974)
  - Guido Morselli, Italian writer, author of Past Conditional, Roma senza papa and Dissipatio HG; in Bologna (committed suicide, 1973)
  - Naoto Tajima, Japanese athlete, gold medalist at the 1936 Summer Olympics; in Osaka (d. 1990)
- Died: George Blewett, 38, Canadian philosopher, noted for works of ethics from a Christian perspective, author of The Metaphysical Basis of Preceptive Ethics, drowned while on a vacation (b. 1873)

== August 16, 1912 (Friday) ==
- Generals Hwang-hui and Chang Tsen-chu were arrested and summarily executed on charges of leading the Wuchang Uprising on October 9, 1911.
- At Berane, Montenegro, twelve Christian villages were attacked, and the inhabitants massacred.
- Captain Stanley Lord of the SS Californian issued his statement to explain the ship's failure to come to the aid of the Titanic. Lord said that the ship, which his Second Officer had seen firing a rocket, was not the Titanic because it steamed away; that Morse code signals from the Californian to the other ship were ignored; and that if the ship had been the Titanic, it would have been seen by the RMS Carpathia at the same time.
- George Basil Haddon-Smith was appointed Governor of the Bahamas.
- Theodore Roosevelt opened his campaign for the presidency with an address at Providence, Rhode Island.
- Sixteen-year-old Virginia Christian was executed in Richmond, Virginia, for the March 18 murder of her employer, Mrs. Ida Belote, in Hampton, despite pleas for clemency made to the state governor. Although she was a minor, the African American girl was described in reports as "the first woman to be put to death in the electric chair in Virginia."
- Born:
  - Ted Drake, English association football player, centre forward for Arsenal from 1934 to 1945, and the England national football team from 1934 to 1938; as Edward Drake, in Southampton, Hampshire (d. 1995)
  - Wendy Hiller, English actress, known for roles in Pygmalion and Major Barbara, recipient of the Academy Award for Best Supporting Actress for Separate Tables; in Bramhall, Cheshire (d. 2003)
- Died: Johann Martin Schleyer, German clergy, inventor of the Volapük language (b. 1831)

== August 17, 1912 (Saturday) ==
- The Eastern Suburbs defeated Glebe 6–4 in the New South Wales Rugby League premiership final in North Sydney, New South Wales.
- The United Kingdom, by its ambassador, Sir John Jordan, sent a message to the Republic of China, announcing that Britain would accept China's suzerainty over Tibet as long as Chinese troops remained out of the Buddhist state in the Himalayas. Britain's objective was to make Tibet a buffer state between China and British India.
- The Williamson Mausoleum at Orphans Cemetery in Eastman, Georgia, was publicly unveiled in honor of Albert Genavie Williamson, a local entrepreneur who donated the land for a cemetery in 1885 as a resting place for children who died before they reached adulthood. The site was listed in the National Register of Historic Places in 1997.
- The provincial government of Ontario issued Regulation 17, which banned the teaching of the French language after the first two years of elementary school in all schools across the province. It was eventually repealed in 1927.
- Clarence Darrow, the famous American lawyer, was successful in winning another verdict of acquittal in a criminal trial—his own. Darrow had been charged with having attempted to bribe a juror in the Los Angeles Times bombing case.
- Born: Elsie Locke, New Zealand children's writer and activist, author of The Runaway Settlers and A Canoe in the Mist, proponent of the Communist Party of New Zealand; as Elsie Farrelly, in Hamilton (d. 2001)

== August 18, 1912 (Sunday) ==
- The Ottoman Empire granted autonomy to its Albanian minority. The Scutari vilayet province, and its capital Tirana, would become independent as Albania after World War I.
- Austrian composer Franz Schreker premiered his opera The Distant Sound at the Opera House in Frankfurt.
- The New Martinsville Potters minor baseball team, formerly the East Liverpool Potters from Pennsylvania, disbanded, one of some 40 baseball teams that dissolved when the Ohio–Pennsylvania League broke apart later that year.
- Born:
  - Dr. Josephine Barnes, English obstetrician and gynaecologist, first woman to be president of the British Medical Association; as Alice Josephine Mary Taylor Barnes, in Sheringham, Norfolk (d. 1999)
  - Elsa Morante, Italian writer, author of History; in Rome (d. 1985)
  - Ertuğrul Osman, Turkish noble, pretender to the throne of the Ottoman Empire, 43rd head of the House of Osman, from 1994 to 2009 as grandson of the Sultan Abdul Hamid II; in Istanbul (d. 2009)
  - Otto Ernst Remer, German army officer, known to have foiled the 20 July plot to overthrow Adolf Hitler, co-founder of the Socialist Reich Party in West Germany; in Neubrandenburg, German Empire(d. 1997)

== August 19, 1912 (Monday) ==
- Grand Vizier Ibrahim Hakki Pasha gave Albanian rebels at Uskub (now Skopje in North Macedonia) fourteen hours to surrender.
- Guillermo Billinghurst was elected President of Peru.

== August 20, 1912 (Tuesday) ==
- Forty Chinese pirates seized control of the British held island of Cheung Chau, near Hong Kong.
- At Salonika, Grand Vizier Ibrahim Hakki Pasha met with Albanian rebel representative Isa Boletini, ending the rebellion at Pristina.
- Ahmed al-Hiba, pretender to the Moroccan throne, seized control of Marrakesh, Morocco, and took nine Frenchmen as hostages, including Vice-Consul Jacques Malgret.
- The Plant Quarantine Act was signed into law, giving the U.S. government the power to regulate the importation and interstate shipment of plant products that might carry with them insects and diseases. The law was effective in curtailing the spread of the LDD moth beyond the New England area, where the population of the pest had increased over the previous seven years.
- Lieutenant Charles Becker of the New York City Police Department was indicted by a grand jury for the killing of Herman Rosenthal.
- Born: Philip Kapleau, American educator, noted instructor of Zen Buddhism in the United States; in New Haven, Connecticut (d. 2004)
- Died:
  - William Booth, 83, British religious leader, founder of The Salvation Army (b. 1829)
  - Walter Goodman, 74, British painter, known for works including The Printseller's Window and The Keeleys on Stage and at Home (b. 1838)

== August 21, 1912 (Wednesday) ==
- Tibet and China agreed to a ceasefire at Lhasa.
- The Prime Minister of Montenegro and his cabinet resigned.
- The U.S. Marines landed at Bluefields, Nicaragua.
- Seventeen-year-old Arthur Rose Eldred of Rockville Centre, New York became the first Boy Scout to earn the rank of Eagle Scout. He was formally awarded the rank in a ceremony on September 2. Since then, over 2 million Scouts have earned the rank, including Eldred's son and two of his grandsons.
- Born:
  - Toe Blake, Canadian hockey player, left wing for the Montreal Canadiens from 1934 to 1948, 10-time Stanley Cup champion; as Joseph Blake, in Coniston, Ontario (d. 1995)
  - Natalia Dudinskaya, Russian ballet dancer, known for her collaborations with Kirov Ballet, in Kharkiv, Russian Empire (now Ukraine) (d. 2003)
  - Robert L. Fish, American mystery writer, co-author of The Assassination Bureau, Ltd and Mute Witness, which inspired the Steve McQueen crime film Bullitt; in Cleveland, Ohio (d. 1981)

== August 22, 1912 (Thursday) ==
- Colonel Charles Mangin and the French Army defeated Moroccan rebel Ahmed al-Hiba at Marrakesh, Morocco. Two weeks later, al-Hiba and his men would be defeated in a second battle.
- England won the Triangular Test Cricket Tournament in London against Australia and South Africa with four wins out of six matches.

== August 23, 1912 (Friday) ==
- Bandar Abbas in Persia (now Iran) was attacked by rebels.
- Sir Hugh Clifford was appointed Governor of the Gold Coast (now Ghana).
- The Pure Food and Drug Act was amended to prohibit drug manufacturers from making false claims on the labels of medication.
- Four-year-old Bobby Dunbar disappeared while his parents were on a fishing trip to a lake near their home in Opelousas, Louisiana. After an eight-month search by Bobby's father, police in Mississippi would announce that they had found the child under the care of handyman William Cantwell Walters, who said that he had been entrusted to take care of Bruce Anderson by Bruce's mother. In a dispute between the Dunbars and Mrs. Anderson, a court would award the boy to the Dunbars, while Walters would be convicted of kidnapping Bobby and serve two years before the verdict was reversed. In 2004, a DNA test would show that Walters had been right and that the child returned to the Dunbars had not been Bobby. It was presumed that the child raised by the Dunbars had been Bruce Anderson, who lived until 1966, and that Bobby Dunbar had died more than 91 years earlier.
- Born:
  - Gene Kelly, American actor and dancer, best known for his film musicals An American in Paris and Singin' in the Rain; as Eugene Kelly, in Pittsburgh, Pennsylvania (d. 1996)
  - Nelson Rodrigues, Brazilian playwright, known for plays including The Wedding Dress; in Recife, Pernambuco state (d. 1980)
  - Alexey Sudayev, Russian engineer, designer of the PPS submachine gun and AS-44 assault rifle; in Alatyr, Alatyrsky Uyezd, Simbirsk Governorate, Russian Empire (now Alatyr, Chuvash Republic, Russia) (d. 1946)

== August 24, 1912 (Saturday) ==
- Portugal put down the native uprising at East Timor. The revolt cost 3,424 Timorese killed and 12,567 wounded, and 289 Portuguese killed and 600 wounded.
- Turkish troops massacred Serbians at Sjenica in what is now Serbia.
- The Panama Canal bill was signed into law, providing that, on the opening of the Canal in 1914, "no tolls shall be levied upon vessels engaged in the coastwise trade of the United States." The discrimination in favor of American vessels would be repealed on June 15, 1914.
- The Lloyd–La Follette Act was passed, amending the U.S. Post Office Appropriations Act by prohibiting federal employees from being removed except for inefficiency, and not without written notice or a right to appeal.
- Alaska was made a U.S. territory by passage of the Second Organic Act and given limited self-government. The U.S. government still controlled Alaska's natural resources. Although an elected Territorial Legislature was created, it could not pass any laws related to fishing, wildlife, soil, divorce, gambling or liquor.
- The collier USS Jupiter, the first electrically propelled ship in the United States Navy, was launched. In 1922, after being decommissioned and refurbished, it would be commissioned as the first American aircraft carrier, the USS Langley.
- Born: Essie Summers, New Zealand romance writer, author of close to 60 novels; as Ethel Snelson Summers, in Christchurch (d. 1998)

== August 25, 1912 (Sunday) ==
- Japanese Government Railways extended the Echigo Line in the Niigata Prefecture, Japan, with stations Yoshida, Wanō, Maki, Sone, and Uchino serving the line.

Kuomintang emblem

- The Kuomintang political party, also referred to as the Nationalist Chinese Party was founded in China by former President Sun Yat-sen and other core members of the secret society Tongmenghui. Under the leadership of Chiang Kai-shek, the Kuomintang would be the ruling political party of mainland China until 1949, and of Taiwan since then.
- Italian Army Aviation Corps Lieutenant Piero Manzini became the first pilot to die in warfare. As part of the Italo-Turkish War, Manzini had taken off on a reconnaissance mission, when his plane's engine failed, causing him to crash into the Mediterranean Sea.
- The once-prosperous copper-mining town of Eholt, British Columbia, suffered a fire that destroyed most of its business district. The Canadian Pacific Railway then moved its facilities to another location, and when the town's post office closed in 1949, there were only 17 residents left. The area is now a ghost town.
- Born:
  - Erich Honecker, German state leader, second General Secretary of the Central Committee of East Germany; in Neunkirchen, Rhine Province, Kingdom of Prussia, German Empire (d. 1994)
  - Ted Key, American cartoonist, creator of the comic panel Hazel; as Theodore Keyser, in Fresno, California (d. 2008)

== August 26, 1912 (Monday) ==
- The Fasanenstrasse Synagogue opened for services in Berlin. Nazi authorities closed it permanently in 1936, and the original building was destroyed by Allied bombing in 1943. A new Jewish community center was built on the original site in 1959.
- Tennis player Maurice McLoughlin defeated Wallace F. Johnson 3–6, 2–6, 6–2, 6–4, 6–2 in the men's singles final in the U.S. National Championships.
- Walter Johnson, pitcher for the Washington Senators, was credited with a loss after coming in as a relief pitcher in a 4–3 defeat by the St. Louis Browns, ending his streak of consecutive games won at 16. Under modern rules, the loss would have listed as a failed save; however, Johnson's streak would still have been ended at 16 because he lost his next start in a game against the Philadelphia Athletics.
- The musical The Pink Lady, composed by Ivan Caryll, returned for a second run at the New Amsterdam Theatre in New York City.
- Born:
  - John Tinniswood, British supercentenarian who was, from June 29 to November 25, 2024, the oldest living man alive; in Liverpool (d.2024). During last 2024, he was, at 112, the 59th oldest living person in the world, in that 58 women were verified to be older than he.
  - Pen Tennyson, British film director, former assistant film director to Alfred Hitchcock, known for films There Ain't No Justice, The Proud Valley and Convoy; in Chelsea, London (killed in plane crash, 1941)
- Died:
  - Feng Ru, 30, Chinese-American engineer and pilot dubbed the "Pioneer of Chinese Aviation", was killed in a crash during a demonstration flight of the first airplane manufactured in China (b. 1883)
  - José María Velasco Gómez, 72, Mexican painter, known for works including Valle de Mexico desde el cerro de Atraeualco and Rocas del cerro de Atzacoalco (b. 1840)

== August 27, 1912 (Tuesday) ==
- The recently deceased Japanese Emperor Mutsuhito was, posthumously, proclaimed the Emperor Meiji.
- The structure for the new Parliament of the Republic of China was set up by regulations issued by President Yuan Shikai. The new, bicameral legislature consisted of 596 representatives and 274 Senators.
- Heavy rains caused flooding across England, particularly in Norfolk and Norwich.
- U.S. Navy cruiser USS Denver, commanded by Commander Thomas Washington, arrived at Corinto, Nicaragua with 350 sailors and marines on board to help with the military intervention in the country. A landing force of 120 men under command of Lieutenant Allen B. Reed disembarked two days later to protect the railway running from the port to the capital city of Managua.
- Born:
  - Gloria Guinness, Mexican-born English fashion editor, noted contributor of Harper's Bazaar; as Gloria Rubio y Altorre, in Guadalajara, (d. 1980)
  - Jose Laurel Jr., Speaker of the House of Representatives of the Philippines from 1954 to 1957 and 1967 to 1971; in Tanauan, Batangas, Philippines (d. 1998)

== August 28, 1912 (Wednesday) ==
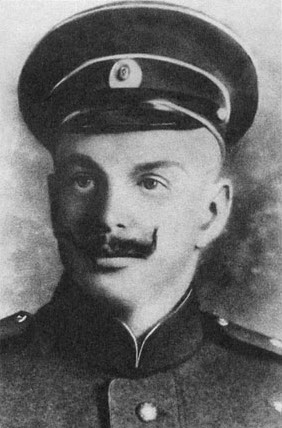
Russian explorer Georgy Brusilov

- Russian explorer Georgy Brusilov began a disastrous expedition to find the Northern Sea Route, setting out from Arkhangelsk in late summer on the ship Svyataya Anna (St. Anna), with a crew of 24. The ship would become trapped in the Arctic ice as it went north, then remained trapped through all of 1913. Only two crewmen, Valerian Albanov and Alexander Konrad, survived, by leaving the ship and heading south. The ship and its crew were missing without a trace for almost 98 years, but in July 2010, explorers found the crew's remains and pages from a sailor's log.
- Born: Tarzán López (stage name for Carlos López Tovar, Mexican wrestler who held the Mexican national welterweight championship as a lucha libre from 1936 to 1939, and fourworld middleweight titles between 1940 and 1952; in Jerez de García Salinas, Zacatecas state (d. 1975)

== August 29, 1912 (Thursday) ==
- Flooding in Wenzhou caused by a typhoon began and would ultimately kill as many as 220,000 people.
- Claims made by entrepreneur Clarence Cunningham to the coal fields of the U.S. territory of Alaska were cancelled by the U.S. Department of the Interior.
- Born:
  - Sohn Kee-chung, Korean athlete, gold medalist at the 1936 Summer Olympics, first Korean to win an Olympic medal; in Shingishū, Korea, Japanese Empire (now Sinŭiju, North Korea) (d. 2002)
  - Wolfgang Suschitzky, Austrian cinematographer, known for his collaborations with British filmmaker Paul Rotha and Mike Hodges; in Vienna, Austria-Hungary (d. 2016)
- Died: Robert Reed Church, 72, African American entrepreneur, founder of Solvent Savings Bank and Trust (b. 1839)

== August 30, 1912 (Friday) ==
- Hermann Schwarz, a recently discharged soldier from the Swiss Army, shot and killed seven men and wounded another six before he was captured in Romanshorn, Switzerland. He was later diagnosed with a mental illness and institutionized for the remainder of his life.
- Rebel Mexican General José Inés Salazar began a campaign of forcing American residents to leave Mexico, ordering the residents of the American Mormon settlement in Colonia Morelos, in the State of Sonora, to leave the country within two weeks. Mexican forces would destroy the American settlements on September 12.
- The USS Denver landed a smaller landing party at San Juan del Sur, Nicaragua, to protect communications in port. The cruiser remained in port for a month relaying messages to other navy ships serving the military intervention in the country.
- Born:
  - Howard Wilson Emmons, American engineer, developer of fire protection engineering; in Morristown, New Jersey (d. 1998)
  - Edward Mills Purcell, American physicist, recipient of the Nobel Prize in Physics for using a nuclear magnetic resonance for research into molecules; in Taylorville, Illinois (d. 1997)
  - Barry Sullivan, American actor, known for his film roles including The Bad and the Beautiful; as Patrick Barry Sullivan, in New York City (d. 1994)
  - Nancy Wake, New Zealand Special Operations Executive agent, member of the Pat O'Leary Line during World War II, recipient of the Order of Australia, Legion of Honour, and Croix de Guerre; in Wellington (d. 2011)

== August 31, 1912 (Saturday) ==
- General Leónidas Plaza was inaugurated for a four-year term as the 24th President of Ecuador, after winning 98% of the vote in the presidential election. He had previously served from 1901 to 1905.
- The Severs Hotel opened in Muskogee, Oklahoma, one of the first of five skyscrapers built in the city before the 1930s. It was listed on the National Register of Historic Places in 1982.
- Born: Katsumi Tezuka, Japanese actor who portrayed Godzilla in Godzilla and Rodan; in Tokyo (d. unknown)
