= Friedenskirche (Hillbrow) =

- Evangelical Lutheran Friedenskirche
- Church of Peace
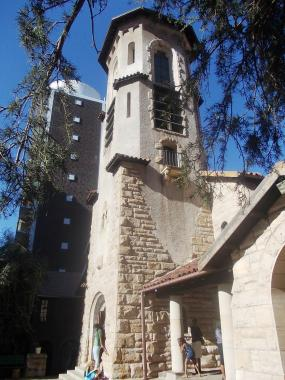
- The Bell tower
- Friedenskirche
- 26.192°S 28.047°E
- Location: Edith Cavell Str, Hillbrow
- Country: South Africa
- Denomination: Lutheran

History
- Consecrated: 22 September 1912

Architecture
- Architect: Theophile Schaerer
- Style: Neo-Romanesque
- Completed: 1912
- Construction cost: ± £6500 / fitments ± £1500

Specifications
- Capacity: 350
- Materials: Concrete / Sandstone / Bricks

Administration
- Parish: Evangelical Lutheran Congregation Johannesburg

Clergy
- Pastor: Remo Köhne - 15/Jan/2017

The Friedenskirche or Church of Peace is situated at 30, Edith Cavell Street, Johannesburg, South Africa. It was built in 1912 and houses the Evangelical Lutheran Congregation of Johannesburg which was established in 1888 as the Deutsch-Evangelische Gemeinde zu Johannesburg (German-Evangelical Congregation of Johannesburg). The building was designed in the Neo-Romanesque style by the Swiss-born architect Theophile Schaerer . The tall bell tower on a rocky prominence above Twist Street remains a landmark to this day.

== History ==
The congregation was formed in 1888 after a memorial service had been held on 20 March by the local missionary, Hermann Kuschke, for Kaiser Wilhelm I who had died on 9 March. Two years later the congregation had built a small church on a stand given to them by the South African Republic government. That building served them for twenty-two years.

The 'Friedenskirche' which is also known as the Church of Peace of the Evangelical Lutheran Congregation was designed by the Swiss-born architect Theophile Schaerer in a Neo-Romanesque manner and includes elements of other classical styles. It was built in 1912 on grounds lent to the German community by the executive of the Zuid-Afrikaansche Republiek in 1895 free of charge. This land was acquired by the church in 1906 from the government of the Transvaal Colony.

The church originally had been designed to be built entirely in sandstone coursed rubble masonry. Cost factors resulted in large plain areas to be brick-built, rendered in Tyrolean plaster.

The church was inaugurated on 22 September 1912. At that time its position on a rocky prominence, high above Twist Street, surrounded by single and double storey dwellings, made it a striking landmark. A distinction it hasn't quite lost yet in spite of high-rise buildings towering over it.

In 1958 the building underwent a mayor overhaul entailing repairs and minor alterations. In the process thereof the original oak-carved altar was replaced by a concrete and sandstone one; the former being relegated to the vestry.

The ten stained glass windows along the side aisles, telling bible stories, were designed by Elly Holm in 1962 (the two stained glass windows to the apse date from 1932). She also created the larger than life sgraffito on the transept wall, depicting St. John the Baptist, and the ceiling fresco in the vestibule

The building is in excellent repair and still serves its purpose.

=== Present Situation ===
For many years the Friedenskirche was at the centre of German cultural life. With the change in the population in Hillbrow beginning in the 1980s the congregation saw a decline in German speaking membership. The vibrant English services attract a growing number of black inner-city residents, coming from all over South Africa and other African countries. The congregation made a conscious decision to be a place of peace and well-being for all the people of its community. The congregation decided to face the challenge of being an inner-city church and launched an Outreach Project in 1998, targeting the disadvantaged residents of Hillbrow, particularly children and youth, with cultural and developmental programmes. On any day of the week, the sounds of children playing in the daycare/crèche mingle with the tunes of musical instruments being practiced at the music school, while youth explore meaning and new avenues for their lives through drama and creative art. The Education Centre including mathematics tutoring and other skill-enhancing projects is also on the programme.
