= Cumberland Colts =

- 1906–1932; (1906–1907, 1916–1918, 1925–1932); Cumberland, Maryland

Minor league affiliations
- Class: Class D (1906–1907, 1916–1918); Class C (1925–1932)
- League: Pennsylvania-Ohio-Maryland League (1906); Western Pennsylvania League (1907); Potomac League (1916); Blue Ridge League (1917–1918); Middle Atlantic League (1925–1932)

Major league affiliations
- Team: New York Yankees (1931–1932)

Minor league titles
- League titles (3): 1918; 1927; 1931

Team data
- Name: Cumberland Giants (1906); Cumberland Rooters (1907); Cumberland Colts (1916–1918, 1925–1932)
- Ballpark: South End Park (1906–1907, 1916–1918); Community Park (1925–1932)

The Cumberland Colts were a minor league baseball team based in Cumberland, Maryland between 1916 and 1932. The "Colts" played as members of the 1916 Potomac League, the Blue Ridge League from 1917 to 1918 and Middle Atlantic League from 1925 to 1932. The Colts were a minor league affiliate of the New York Yankees in 1931 and 1932, with the Colts winning league championships in 1918, 1927 and 1931.

The Colts were preceded in minor league play by the Cumberland Giants of the 1906 Pennsylvania-Ohio-Maryland League and the 1907 Cumberland Rooters of the Western Pennsylvania League.

The Cumberland teams hosted minor league home games at South End Park through 1918 and at Community Park from 1925 to 1932.

== History ==
=== 1906–1907 Pre–Colts teams ===
The Colts were preceded by the 1906 Cumberland Giants and 1907 Cumberland Rooters.

The Giants were charter members of the Class D level Pennsylvania-Ohio-Maryland League. The Cumberland Giants finished with a record of 50–48, fifth place in the eight–team Pennsylvania-Ohio-Maryland League. Cumberland was managed by Harry Irvine and Dan Raley. The Giants began play at South End Park.

Cumberland briefly had a team during the 1907 season. The Cumberland Rooters played 25 games in the Class D level Western Pennsylvania League after the Latrobe, Pennsylvania franchise was moved to Cumberland during the season. The Rooters had a record of 5–20 before the franchise moved to Piedmont, West Virginia on June 27, 1907. The franchise folded before the end of the 1907 season. The Latrobe/cumberland/Piedmont team finished with a 18–46 overall record, managed by S. Whaley, William Morrow, Tom Dillon, Don Curtis and Bill Malarkey.

=== Potomac League 1916 / Blue Ridge League 1917–1918 ===
In 1916, the Cumberland Colts became charter members of the four–team Class D level Potomac League and were the foundation franchise for the league. Cumberland's Colonel Nelson W. Russler and Cumberland attorney Fuller Barnard Jr. who became the Potomac League's president, laid the groundwork for the Potomac League at a meeting in February, 1916. Russler had been a business manager for earlier local Cumberland teams. Charles Boyer, president of the Blue Ridge League organized a group of businessmen to garner interest in fielding a league in the area. One year earlier, Cumberland had sought entry into the 1915 Blue Ridge League, but were unsuccessful due to distance.

On August 16, 1916, the Colts were in third place with a 23–35 record when the Potomac League permanently folded. The Colts' 1916 manager was Thomas Russler. The Colts finished behind the Frostburg Demons (33–25), and Piedmont Drybugs (26–30). The Lonaconing Giants (26–18) had previously folded on July 23, 1916. The Potomac league struggled financially, as Cumberland was the only league franchise turning a profit. On July 23, 1916, when the Lonaconing Giants franchise folded, this left the Potomac League with three teams and the schedule was rearranged for the season to continue. The league played on until Frostburg folded on August 16, 1916, causing the Potomac League to permanently fold.

In 1917, the Cumberland Colts resumed play, as the franchise became members of the Class D level Blue Ridge League in mid–season. On June 20, 1917, the Chambersburg Maroons franchise of Chambersburg, Pennsylvania moved to Cumberland with a 16–25 record. The team proceeded to compile a record of 20–38 while based in Cumberland. With an overall record of 36–63, the Chambersburg/Cumberland team placed sixth and last in the Blue Ridge League, playing under managers Eddie Hooper and Brook Crist. The Colts finished the season 26.0 games behind the first place Hagerstown Harriers in the final league standings. The Colts continued play at South End Park.

Sunday Blue Laws prevented professional baseball from being played in many counties in the region. Allegany County, in which Cumberland is home, did not have Sunday Blue Laws. Cumberland scheduled to play games on Sundays over the protests of the other league teams. Both the Gettysburg and Hagerstown franchised refused to play Sunday games.

On August 27, 1917, the Frederick Hustlers had defeated Cumberland 5–3. It was reported that the home Cumberland crowd of almost 2,000 rushed the field after the game to attack the umpire. The umpire received a police escort from the field. Blue ridge League President J.V. Jamison, who was present at the game verified that the umpire was escorted safely to an awaiting vehicle and away from the angry fans.

The 1918 Cumberland Colts were in first place when the four–team Blue Ridge League disbanded on June 18, 1918. The Colts finished 11–6 under Manager Eddie Hooper in the shortened season. When the Blue Ridge League resumed play in 1920 after World War I, Cumberland did not return as a league franchise.

=== Middle Atlantic League 1925–1932 ===
After a seven–year absence, the Cumberland Colts began play as charter members of the 1925 Class C level Middle Atlantic League. The Colts finished with a record of 56–40, placing second overall in the six–team Middle Atlantic League standings. There were no league playoffs in 1925. Cumberland played under managers Thomas Ray, Hank McEnroe and James McGuire. The 1925 Cumberland Colts began play at Community Park.

On September 7, 1925, Cumberland pitcher Paul Secrist threw a no–hitter in a 8–0 victory over the Scottdale Scotties on the last day of the season.

The Cumberland Colts finished third in the Middle 1926 Atlantic League regular season standings. Cumberland had a record of 62–48, playing under manager Pat Ragan. The Colts were 5.0 games behind the first place Fairmont Diamonds in the final standings and 2.0 games behind the second place Johnstown Johnnies.

The 1927 Cumberland Colts were Middle Atlantic League Champions. In the 1927 Middle Atlantic League regular season, the Colts finished 66–47, first in the standings, to capture the Pennant under manager Guy Thompson. The Colts finished 2½ games ahead of the Fairmont Black Diamonds in the final regular season standings of the eight–team league. In the 1927 Atlantic League playoffs, the Cumberland Colts defeated the Johnstown Johnnies 4 games to 2 to win the championship.

The Colts had the best overall record in the Middle Atlantic League in 1928 but did not qualify for the league playoffs. With a 75–49 record, Cumberland was first overall under manager John Byrnes, finishing 3½ games ahead of the second-place Fairmont Black Diamonds. Fairmont was the Middle Atlantic League champion after defeating the Wheeling Stogies in the playoff Final. The league used a spit season schedule to determine the playoff finalists.

With a 1929 record of 65–53, the Cumberland Colts placed third in the 1929 Middle Atlantic League regular season standings, finishing 4.0 games behind the Charleroi Governors and Wheeling Stogies, who tied for first with 67–47 records. The Colts' played the season under returning manager John Byrnes.

The 1930 Cumberland Colts placed sixth in the eight–team 1930 Middle Atlantic League regular season standings and did not qualify for the playoffs. The Colts finished with a record of 59–59 under managers Joe Phillips and John Byrnes, finishing 5½ games behind the Johnstown Johnnies and Clarksburg Generals, who tied for first place with 64–53 records.

The first home night game was played at Community Baseball Park on the evening of August 4, 1930. To add to the event, the local Williams Piano and Furniture Company supplied broadcasting equipment that was used to play music and make announcements during the game.

The 1931 Cumberland Colts became an affiliate of the New York Yankees and were the 1931 Middle Atlantic League Champions, as the Middle Atlantic League expanded to a twelve–team league. Cumberland finished with a regular season record of 82–46, placing second in the Middle Atlantic League standings, 1.0 game behind the Charleston Senators under Manager Leo Mackey. In the Playoffs, the top two teams played in the Finals. There, the Cumberland Colts defeated the Charleston Senators 4 games to 2 to capture the championship.

The 1932 season was the final season for minor league baseball in Cumberland. The Cumberland Colts continued play as an affiliate of the New York Yankees and hosted an exhibition game in 1932 against the Yankees with Babe Ruth and Lou Gehrig. Ruth hit a home run in the game.

The 1932 Cumberland Colts finished 62–60, placing fourth in the six–team Middle Atlantic League under Manager Leo Mackey, 7.0 games behind the first place Charleston Senators. The Colts finished play at Community Park. The Cumberland Colts franchise permanently folded after the 1932 season.

Cumberland has not hosted another minor league team.

== The ballparks ==
Cumberland minor league teams first played home games at South End Park in 1906 and 1907 and from 1916 to 1918. Also known as Southside Park, the ballpark was located near the C&O Canal & King Street in Cumberland, Maryland.

From 1925 to 1932, the Cumberland Colts hosted minor league home games at Community Park. While Cumberland was an affiliate of the New York Yankees, Babe Ruth appeared in an exhibition game at Community Park, hitting a home run. The ballpark was also known as Mid–City Park from 1926 to 1929 and had a capacity of 3,000 in 1926 and 2,400 in 1931.

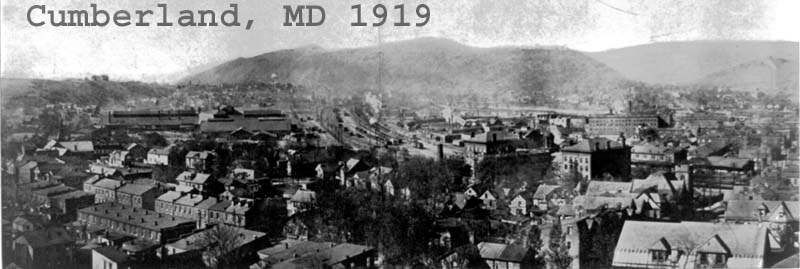
(1919) Cumberland, Maryland

== Timeline ==
Year(s)	# Yrs.	Team	Level	League	Ballpark
1906	1	Cumberland Giants	Class D	Pennsylvania-Ohio-Maryland League	South End Park
1907	1	Cumberland Rooters	Class D	Western Pennsylvania League	South End Park
1916	1	Cumberland Colts	Class D	Potomac League	South End Park
1917–1918	2	Cumberland Colts	Class D	Blue Ridge League	South End Park
1925–1932	8	Cumberland Colts	Class C	Middle Atlantic League	Community Park

== Notable alumni ==
- Walt Bashore (1930)
- Ivan Bigler (1917)
- Frank Brazill (1918)
- Joe Buskey (1926)
- Swede Carlstrom (1932)
- Joe Cobb (1917)
- Rip Collins (1932)
- Jess Cortazzo (1926–1927)
- George Durning (1929–1930)
- Frank Gleich (1927)
- Hanson Horsey (1917)
- Lee King (1926)
- Pinky May (1932)
- Leo Meyer (1917)
- Pat Ragan (1926)
- Pete Rambo (1926–1927)
- Denny Sothern (1926)
- Jim Spotts (1931)
- Elmer Steele (1917)
- Bob Synnott (1931–1932)
- Vito Tamulis (1931)
- Joe Vitelli (1932)
- Kemp Wicker (1932)

== See also ==
- Cumberland Colts players
