= Joe Fogarty (basketball) =

American basketball player and coach (1885–1925)

Biographical details
- Born: March 7, 1885
- Died: August 15, 1925 (aged 40); Williamsport, Pennsylvania, U.S.

Playing career
- 1902–1903: Camden Electrics
- 1903–1904: Chicopee/Pittsfield/Northampton
- 1903–1904: Lynn/South Framingham
- 1904–1905: Natick
- 1905–1906: De Neri
- 1905–1906: Tamaqua
- 1906–1908: East Liverpool Potters
- 1908–1912: Johnstown Johnnies
- 1912–1915: De Neri
- 1915–1916: Trenton
- 1916–1918: Greystock Greys

Coaching career (HC unless noted)
- 1904–1905: Natick
- 1908–1912: Johnstown Johnnies
- 1912–1915: De Neri
- 1914–1915: Lafayette
- 1915–1916: Trenton
- 1916–1918: Greystock Greys
- 1918–1922: Penn (Asst.)
- 1919: Reading Bears
- 1919–1920: De Neri
- 1921–1922: Philadelphia
- 1922–1925: Yale

Accomplishments and honors

Championships
- 1917 Eastern Basketball League; 1923 Eastern Intercollegiate Basketball League

Records
- 343–231 (.598) (professional); 33–34 (.493) (college)

Joseph John Fogarty (March 7, 1885 – August 15, 1925) was an American basketball player and coach who was the head men's basketball coach at Yale University from 1922 to 1925.

== Biography ==
Fogarty attended Roman Catholic High School in Philadelphia and began his professional career for Camden of the National Basketball League after graduating. He was one of many National League star to leave to play in New England and played alongside Harry Hough in Natick, Massachusetts. He returned to Philadelphia to play for the De Neri club. He also played for the Tamaqua club during the 1905–1906 season. When the Central Basketball League started in 1906, Fogarty joined the East Liverpool Potters. In 1908, he became the player-coach of the Johnstown Johnnies. In February 1914, he was hired as a special trainer for the Muhlenberg College men's basketball team. During the 1914–1915 season, he was the head coach at Lafayette. After the Central League folded, Fogarty rejoined De Neri, which was now a member of the Eastern Basketball League. He was the player–coach of the Greystock Greys from 1915 to 1918 and lead the club to the 1916–17 Eastern League championship. After the Eastern League folded, he was an assistant to Lon Jourdet and Edward McNichol at Penn.

In 1922, Fogarty was hired to revamp a struggling Yale Bulldogs men's basketball program. He rebuilt the team by teaching fundamentals and selecting players regardless of their previous records. He benched most of the previous year's starters in favor of the reserves. In their first season under Fogarty, Yale unexpectedly won the Eastern Intercollegiate Basketball League, their first since 1917. In August 1925, Fogarty was hospitalized with pneumonia while on a road trip with his wife. He died on August 15, 1925 in Williamsport, Pennsylvania.
