= McKeesport Tubers (baseball) =

- 1890–1940; (1890, 1905, 1907–1910, 1912, 1914, 1934–1940); McKeesport, Pennsylvania

Minor league affiliations
- Previous classes: Class D (1912, 1914, 1934–1940); Class C (1908–1910); Class D (1907); Class C (1905)
- League: Pennsylvania State Association
- Previous leagues: Pennsylvania–West Virginia League (1914); Ohio–Pennsylvania League (1908–1912); Pennsylvania–Ohio–Maryland League (1907); Ohio–Pennsylvania League (1905); Tri-State League (1890)

Major league affiliations
- Previous teams: Pittsburgh Pirates (1939–1940); Boston Red Sox (1936); Boston Braves (1935); Pittsburgh Pirates (1934)

Team data
- Previous names: McKeesport Little Braves (1940); McKeesport Little Pirates (1939); McKeesport Tubers (1936–1938); McKeesport Braves (1935); McKeesport Tubers (1934); McKeesport Royals (1914); McKeesport Tubers (1907–1912); McKeesport Colts (1905); McKeesport (1890)

The McKeesport Tubers was the name of several minor league baseball teams located in McKeesport, Pennsylvania between 1890 and 1940.

McKeesport's first team was played as an unnamed team, in 1890, and represented the city in the Tri-State League. In 1905 the city fielded a team for the Ohio–Pennsylvania League, the McKeesport Colts. In 1907 the team was once again fielded this time as the Tubers, a member of the Pennsylvania–Ohio–Maryland League. A year later the team returned to the Ohio–Pennsylvania League where they continued to play until 1912, missing only the 1911 season. The McKeesport Royals played for one season in the Pennsylvania–West Virginia League in 1914. The team posted a 2-2 record, before disbanding, with the Charleroi team on May 26, 1914. The league folded shortly afterwards on June 1, 1914.

The city did not host another team until 1934 when the Tubers were resurrected as the Class D affiliate of the Pittsburgh Pirates. The team played in the Pennsylvania State Association. The club was also affiliated with the Boston Braves and the Boston Red Sox during their existence. In 1939, the team once again became an affiliate of the Pirates. The following season the Pirates relocated the team, to Oil City, and became the Oil City Oilers.

The team's name changed several times over their brief existence. In 1935 the team was known as the McKeesport Braves. In 1939 they were listed as the McKeesport Little Pirates, and as the McKeesport Little Braves in 1940. A team that also represented the city in the Central Basketball League was also named the Tubers.

== Notable alumni ==
- Art Doll
- Bill Ford
- Ken Heintzelman
- Frank Kalin
- Bob Katz
- Elmer Klumpp
- Al LaMacchia
- Ralph McLeod
- Speed Walker
