= Greensburg, Pennsylvania =

City in Pennsylvania, US

- City
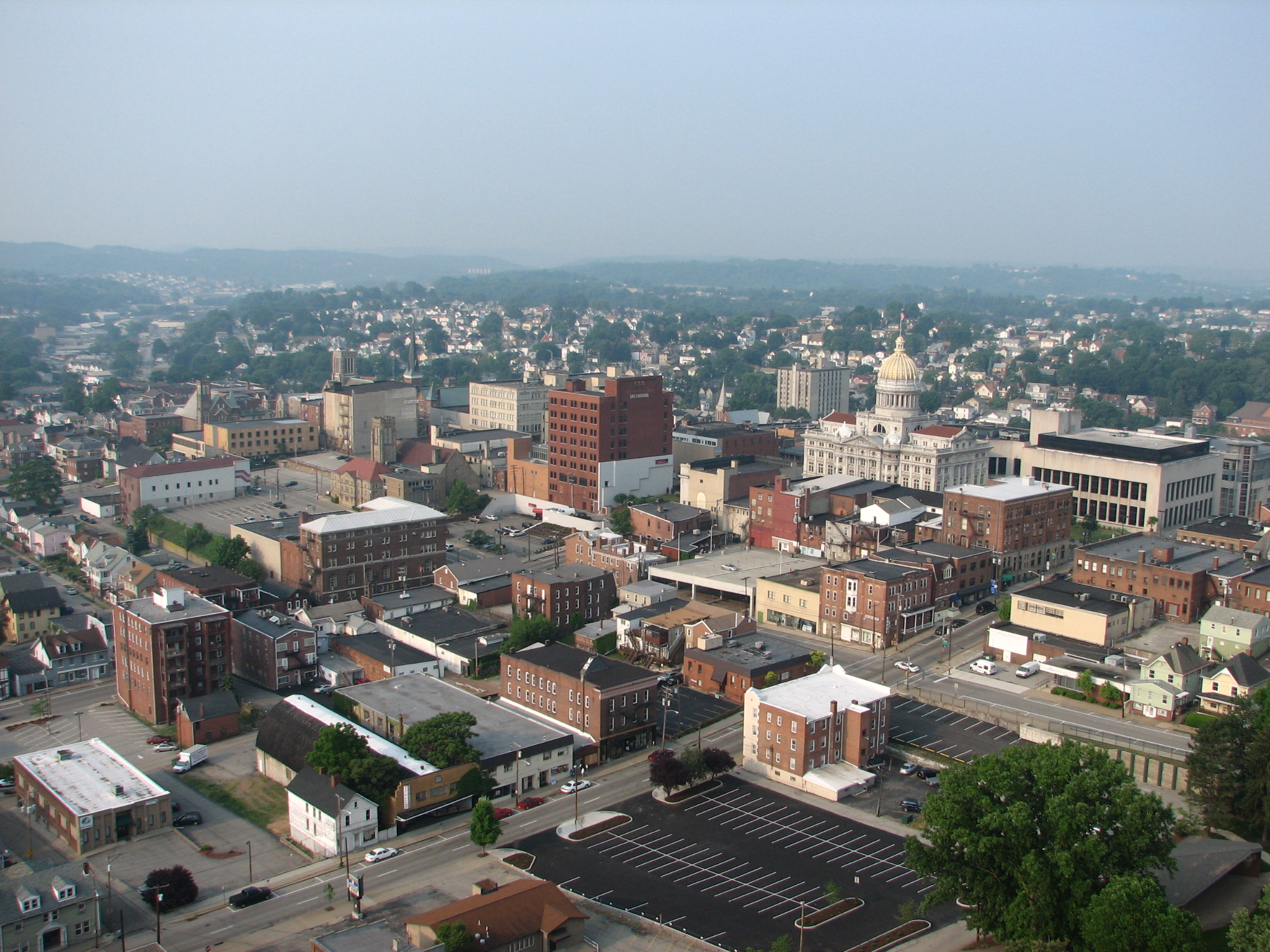
- Downtown Greensburg

- Flag Seal
- Interactive map of Greensburg, Pennsylvania
- Location within Pennsylvania Location within the United States
- Coordinates: 40°17′52″N 79°32′32″W
- Country: United States
- State: Pennsylvania
- County: Westmoreland
- Incorporated: February 9, 1799
- Named for: Nathanael Greene

Government
  - Type: Mayor-Council
  - Body: Greensburg City Council
  - Mayor: Robert L. Bell (D)
  - Fire Chief: Thomas Bell

Area
  - Total: 4.05 sq mi (10.50 km^{2})
  - Land: 4.05 sq mi (10.50 km^{2})
  - Water: 0 sq mi (0.00 km^{2})
- Elevation: 1,017 ft (310 m)

Population (2020)
  - Total: 14,976
  - Density: 3,693/sq mi (1,425.8/km^{2})
  - Demonym: Greensburger
- Time zone: UTC−5 (EST)
  - Summer (DST): UTC−4 (EDT)
- ZIP codes: 15601, 15605, 15606
- Area codes: 724, 878
- FIPS code: 42-31200
- GNIS feature ID: 1215700
- Website: www.greensburgpa.org

Greensburg is a city in Westmoreland County, Pennsylvania, United States, and its county seat. The population was 14,976 at the 2020 census. Located 30 miles (48 km) southeast of Pittsburgh, Greensburg is a part of the Pittsburgh metropolitan area. The city lies within the Laurel Highlands and the ecoregion of the Western Allegheny Plateau. The city is named after Nathanael Greene, a major general of the Continental Army in the American Revolutionary War.

== History ==
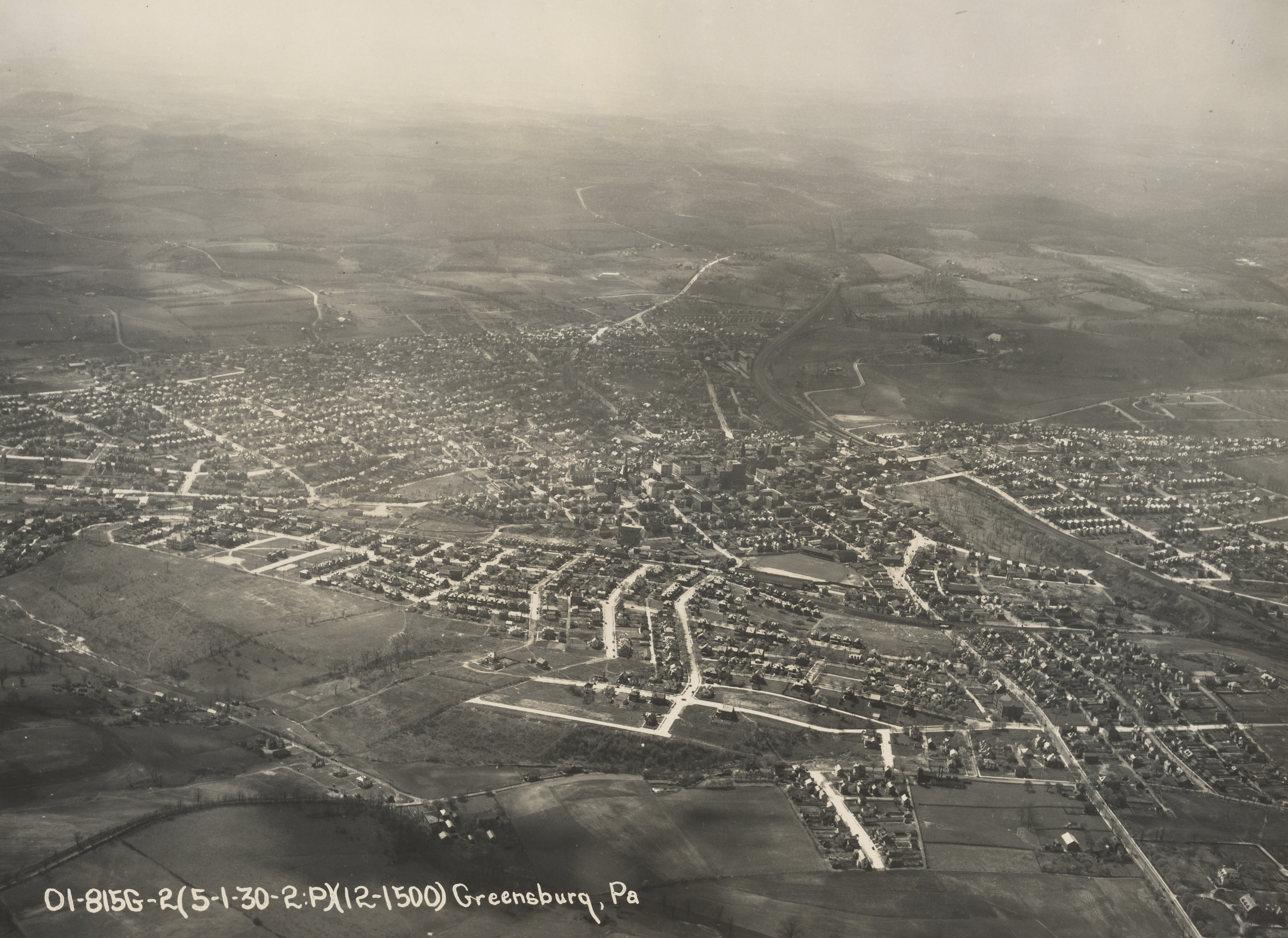
Greensburg in 1930

Hannastown was the original Westmoreland County seat. According to historian John Boucher, after Hannastown was attacked and burned by "Indians and Tories" in 1782, efforts began to relocate the county seat. On December 10, 1785, county officials contracted with Christopher Truby and William Jack to purchase two acres of Newtown land to erect public buildings. Ludwick Otterman later subscribed to the agreement. Boucher, therefore, designates December 10, 1785, as the date Newtown became the Westmoreland County seat.

The first courthouse and jail were a single log-and-plank building. The jail portion had a heavy stone wall that extended some distance above the ground, "perhaps to keep prisoners from cutting their way out". Court was first held in this structure on January 7, 1787. By 1801, a two-story brick courthouse had been erected. A later courthouse, the fourth, was built on the same lot. The area surrounding the courthouse became Greensburg ("Greenesburgh", as some documents referred to it at the time). It was named for American Revolutionary War General Nathanael Greene. Greensburg was formally incorporated as a borough on February 9, 1799, making it the first borough in the county.

The Pennsylvania Railroad reached the town in 1852. After the Civil War the railroads expanded their network to reach the Pittsburgh Seam, a rich deposit of bituminous coal close by Greensburg. Strong demand for coal and coke benefited the local economy through the 1930s, but had the opposite effect in the second half of the 20th century. For example, The Keystone Coal and Coke Company (established in 1902) owned and operated some 15 mines in and around Greensburg. All of them were shut down by the 1960s.^{[citation needed]}

Seton Hill University, formerly Seton Hill College, and previously St. Joseph's Academy, became a four-year women's institution in 1918. Greensburg became a City of the Third Class on January 2, 1928.

Greengate Mall opened in the late 1960s. It was demolished and replaced by an outdoor mall in 2005. Westmoreland Mall opened in 1977. A casino opened in 2020, bringing over 500 jobs to the area.

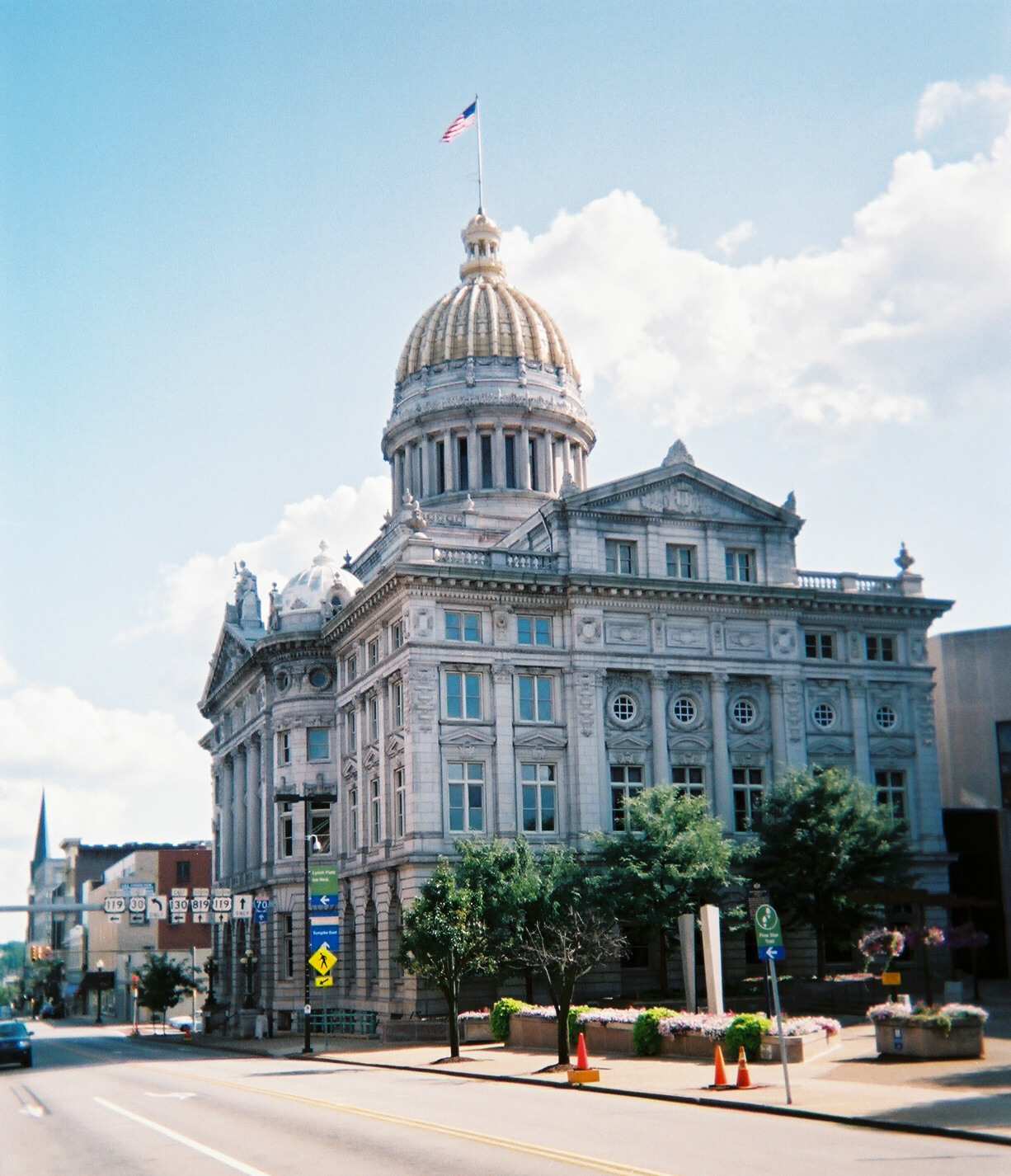
Westmoreland County Courthouse

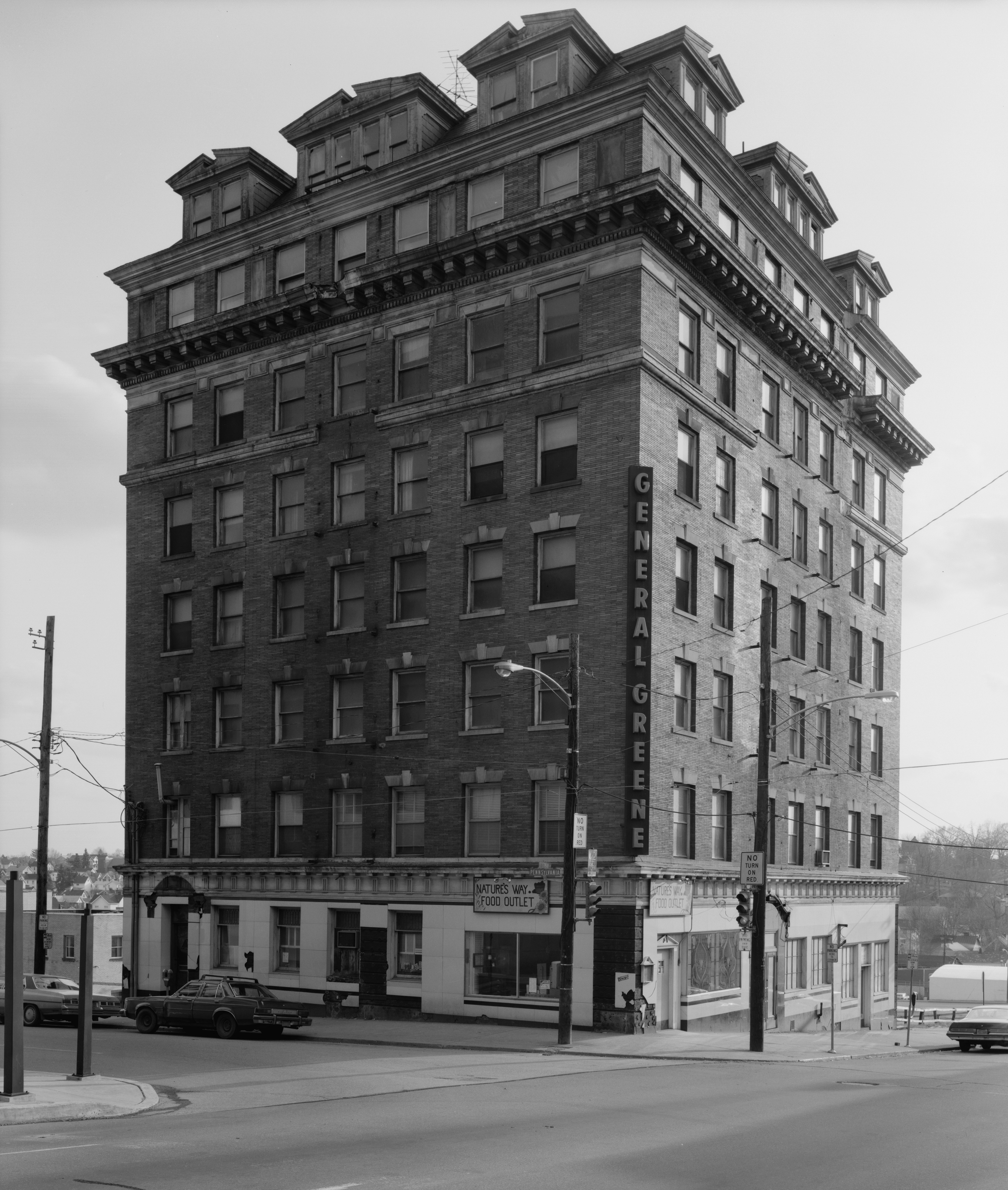
Hotel Rappe, later Greensburger Hotel, later General Greene Hotel, at 24 West Otterman Street in 1983. Built in 1903, since demolished.

The city is home to the Roman Catholic Diocese of Greensburg, founded in 1951.

== Neighborhoods ==
Two neighborhoods have been designated as U.S. historic districts, the Greensburg Downtown Historic District and the Academy Hill Historic District. Also listed on the National Register of Historic Places are the Greensburg Railroad Station and Westmoreland County Courthouse.

== Demographics ==
Historical population
Census	Pop.	Note	%±
1810	685		—
1820	771		12.6%
1830	810		5.1%
1840	800		−1.2%
1850	1,051		31.4%
1860	1,388		32.1%
1870	1,642		18.3%
1880	2,500		52.3%
1890	4,202		68.1%
1900	6,508		54.9%
1910	13,012		99.9%
1920	15,033		15.5%
1930	16,508		9.8%
1940	16,743		1.4%
1950	16,923		1.1%
1960	17,383		2.7%
1970	17,077		−1.8%
1980	17,588		3.0%
1990	16,318		−7.2%
2000	15,899		−2.6%
2010	14,892		−6.3%
2020	14,976		0.6%

=== 2020 census ===
As of the 2020 census, Greensburg had a population of 14,976. The median age was 40.9 years. 17.4% of residents were under the age of 18, and 21.9% of residents were 65 years of age or older. For every 100 females there were 83.9 males, and for every 100 females age 18 and over there were 80.8 males age 18 and over.

100.0% of residents lived in urban areas, while 0.0% lived in rural areas.

There were 6,834 households in Greensburg, of which 21.2% had children under the age of 18 living in them. Of all households, 32.3% were married-couple households, 23.4% were households with a male householder and no spouse or partner present, and 36.7% were households with a female householder and no spouse or partner present. About 42.7% of all households were made up of individuals, and 17.3% had someone living alone who was 65 years of age or older.

There were 7,607 housing units, of which 10.2% were vacant. The homeowner vacancy rate was 2.3%, and the rental vacancy rate was 9.3%.

Racial composition as of the 2020 census
Race	Number	Percent
White	12,988	86.7%
Black or African American	774	5.2%
American Indian and Alaska Native	30	0.2%
Asian	155	1.0%
Native Hawaiian and Other Pacific Islander	0	0.0%
Some other race	89	0.6%
Two or more races	940	6.3%
Hispanic or Latino (of any race)	312	2.1%

=== 2000 census ===
As of the 2000 census, there were 15,889 people, 7,144 households, and 3,922 families residing in the city. The population density was 3,746.1 inhabitants per square mile (1,446.4/km^{2}). There were 7,734 housing units at an average density of 1,823.4 per square mile (704.0/km^{2}). The racial makeup of the city was 93.43% White, 3.91% African American, 0.09% Native American, 0.70% Asian, 0.01% Pacific Islander, 0.38% from other races, and 1.47% from two or more races. Hispanic or Latino of any race were 1.08% of the population.

There were 7,144 households, out of which 24.1% had children under the age of 18 living with them, 39.3% were married couples living together, 12.8% had a female householder with no husband present, and 45.1% were non-families. 39.2% of all households were made up of individuals, and 15.4% had someone living alone who was 65 years of age or older. The average household size was 2.11, and the average family size was 2.85.

In the city, the age distribution of the population shows 20.2% under the age of 18, 10.0% from 18 to 24, 27.9% from 25 to 44, 22.6% from 45 to 64, and 19.3% who were 65 years of age or older. The median age was 39 years. For every 100 females, there were 81.7 males. For every 100 females age 18 and over, there were 76.1 males.

The median income for a household in the city was $30,324, and the median income for a family was $41,112. Males had a median income of $33,306 versus $24,246 for females. The per capita income for the city was $18,312. About 10.8% of families and 13.6% of the population were below the poverty line, including 18.1% of those under age 18 and 11.9% of those age 65 or over.

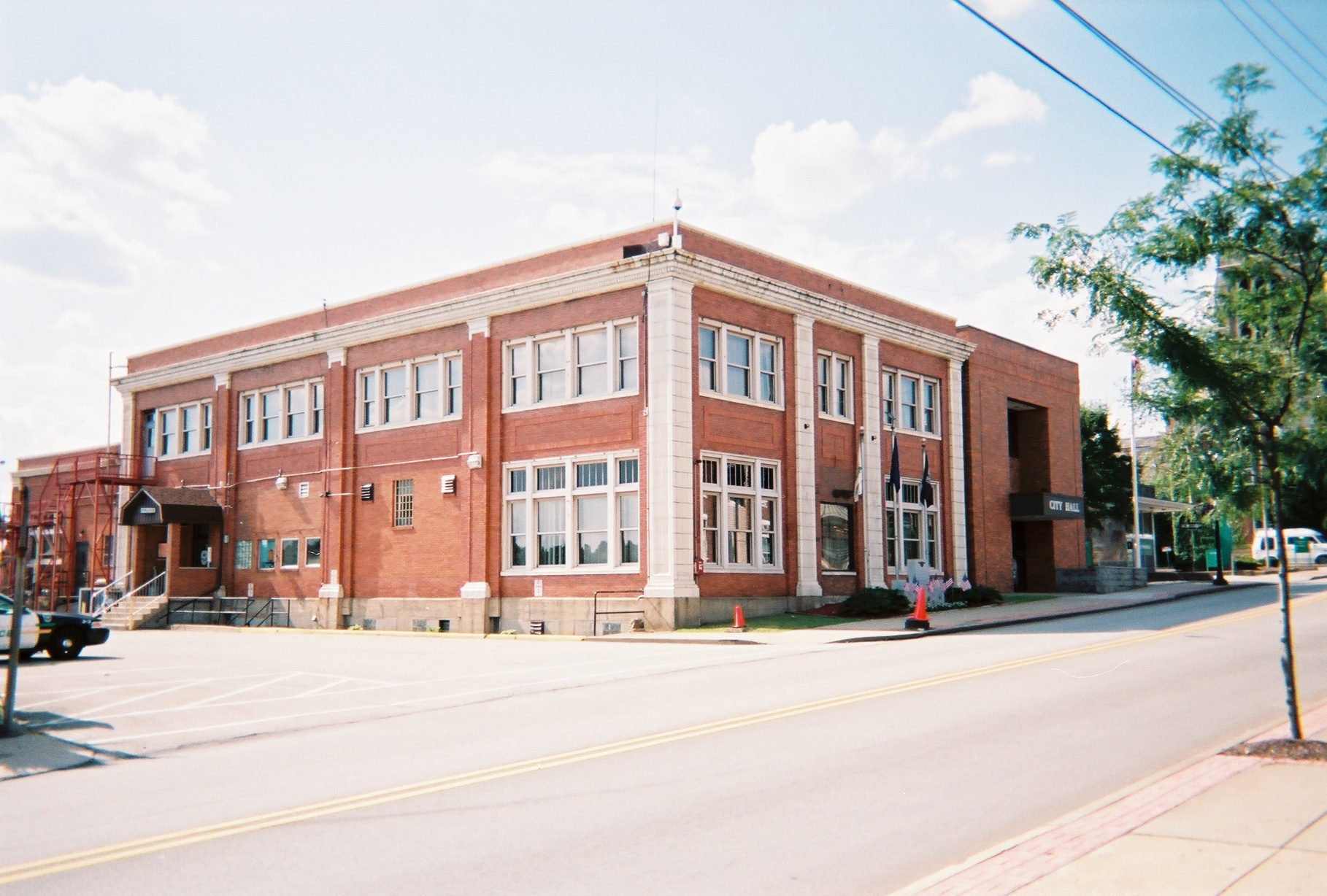
City Hall, formerly headquarters of West Penn Railways

== Economy ==
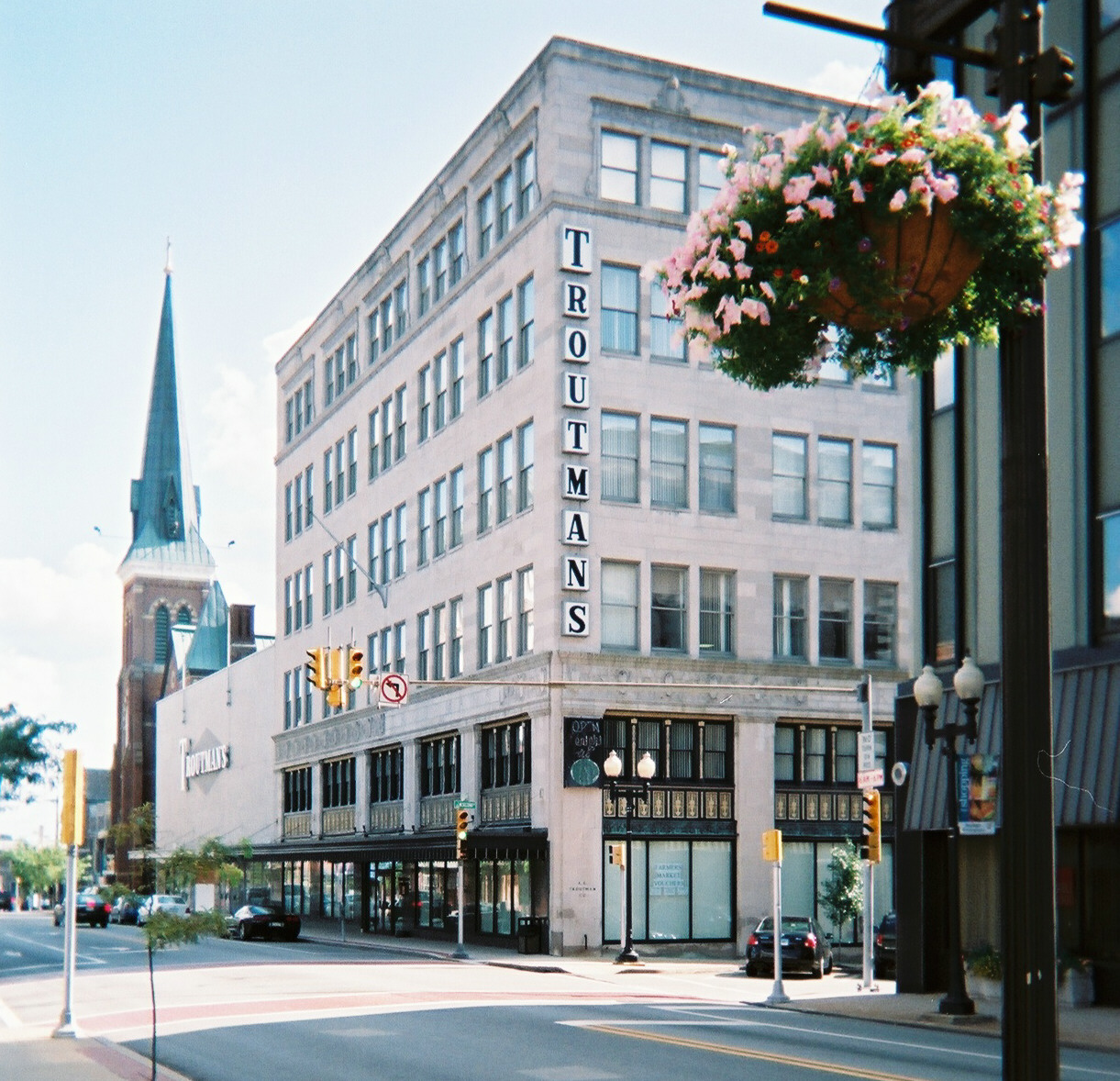
The former Troutman's Department Store on South Main Street

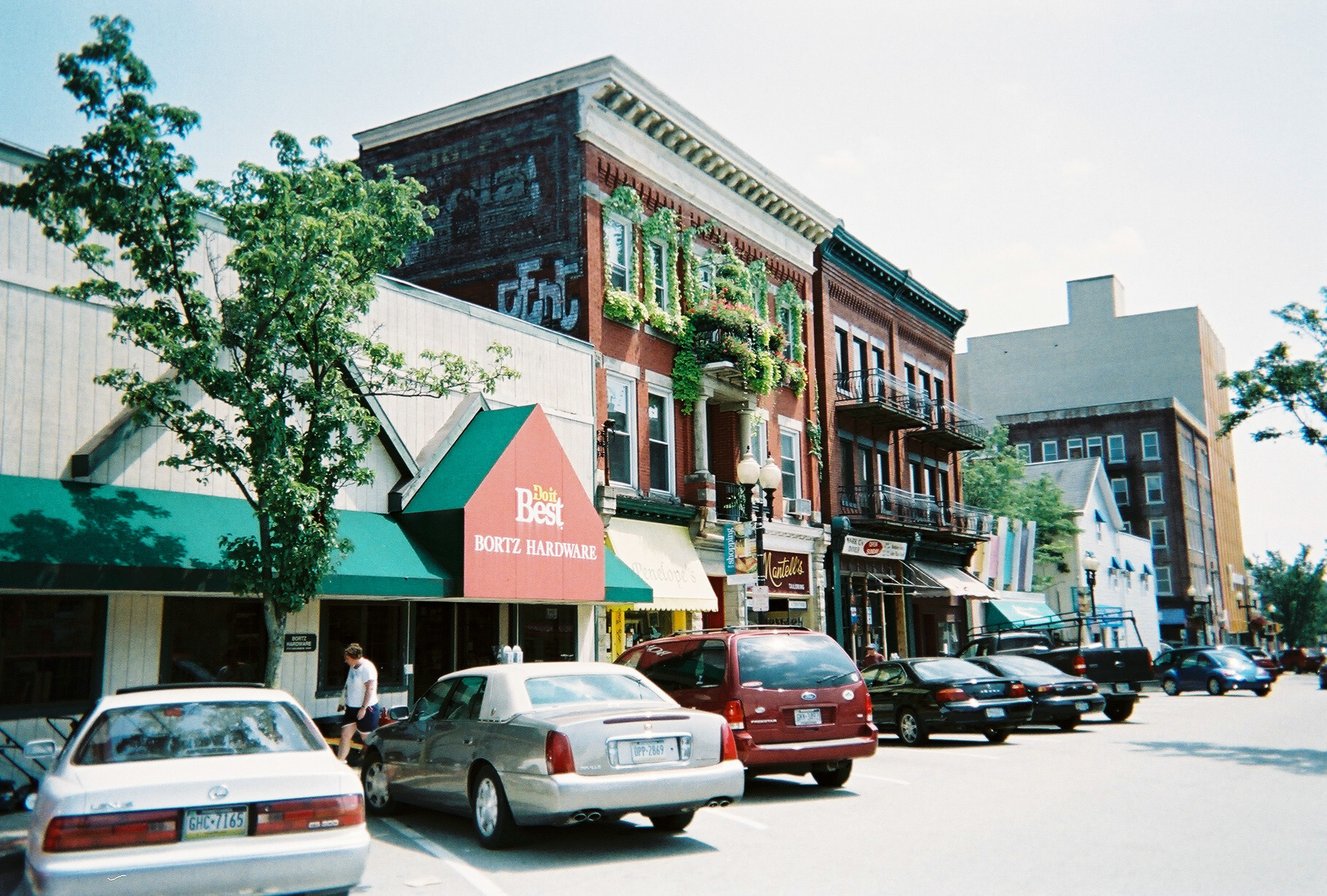
South Pennsylvania Avenue

Westmoreland Mall and the attached Live! Casino Pittsburgh is the largest shopping and entertainment complex in the Greensburg area and Westmoreland County. Nearly 300 employees of the Pennsylvania Department of Labor and Industry work in the State Office Building on North Main Street.

== Notable institutions ==
- Westmoreland Museum of American Art
- Stage Right!
- Saint Emma Monastery

== Government and politics ==
Greensburg is an incorporated city governed by a mayor and a four-member City Council. The mayor and the City Council members serve four-year terms. The seat of government is the Greensburg City Hall.

Greensburg is home to the 14th Quartermaster Detachment, a United States Army Reserve unit.

== Education ==
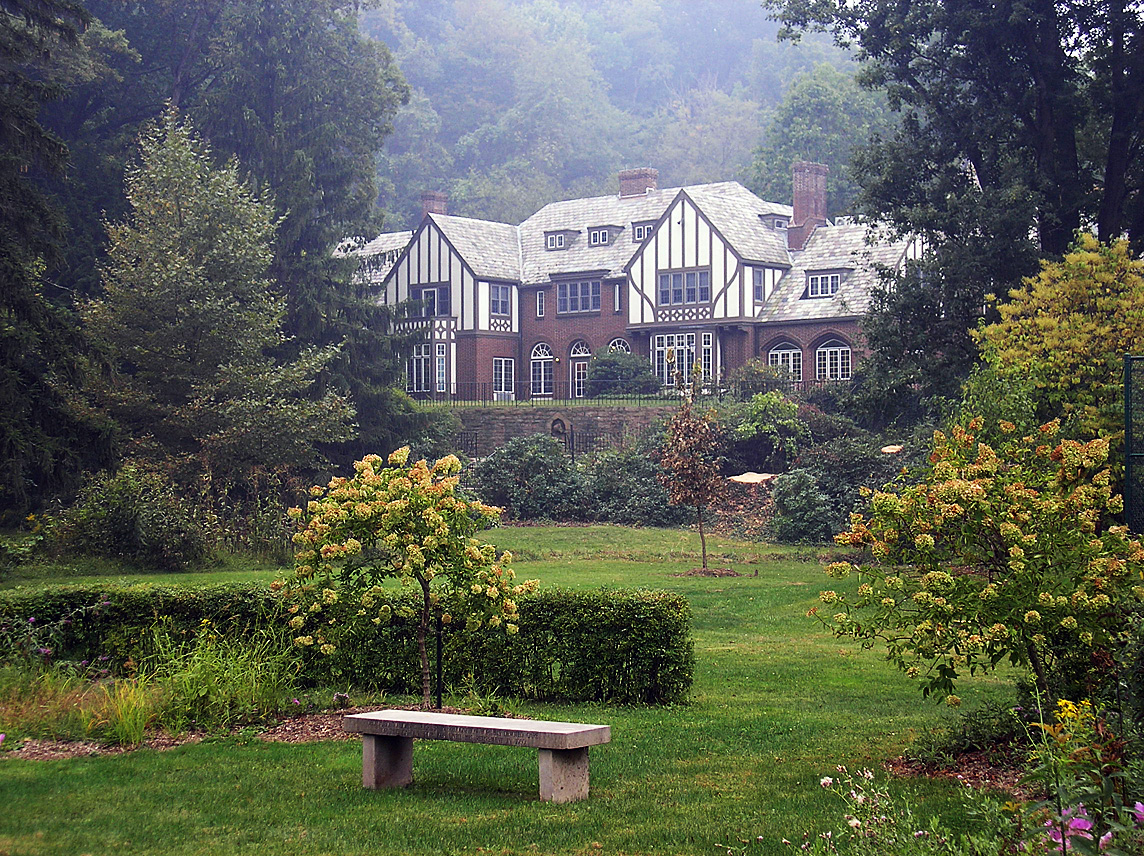
University of Pittsburgh at Greensburg

The city limits are within the Greensburg-Salem School District. The private Greensburg Central Catholic High School is also in the town.

Seton Hill University and the University of Pittsburgh at Greensburg are in the town.

== Professional sports ==
=== American football ===
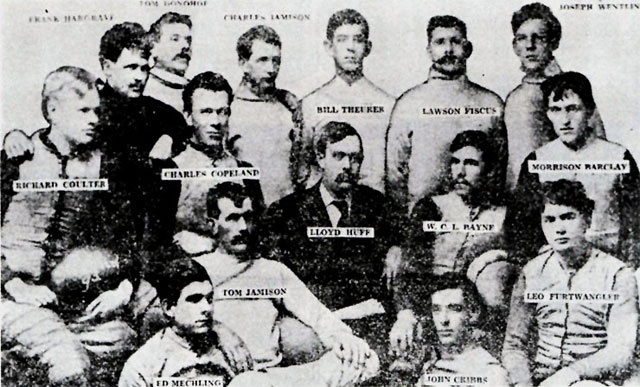
Greensburg Athletic Association (1893)

From 1890 to 1900 Greensburg was home to the Greensburg Athletic Association, one of the earliest professional American football teams.

=== Baseball ===
In 1907, Greensburg fielded the Greensburg Red Sox, a Minor League Baseball team in the Class D Western Pennsylvania League, which played one season. From 1934 to 1939 Greensburg was the home of the Greensburg Red Wings, a Class D Minor League Baseball team.

== Notable people ==
- Karen Angle – professional wrestling performer
- Carroll Baker – actress
- Paul Bartholomew – architect
- Randy Bish – editorial cartoonist
- Scott G. Bullock – lawyer
- James Clarke – Governor of Iowa Territory
- K.C. Constantine – mystery fiction author
- Stephen Dau – author
- Brett Detar – songwriter, record producer
- John Dorsey – poet and screenwriter
- Rebecca Franklin – food writer
- Todd Gallagher – social scientist
- Doc Gessler - baseball player
- Paul Gilbert – guitarist for the bands Racer X and Mr. Big
- Jesse Root Grant – father of general and 18th US President, Ulysses S. Grant
- Zach Jackson – baseball player
- Greg Jones – collegiate wrestler
- Jasmine Jones – bobsledder and Olympic bronze medalist
- Sheila Kelley – actress
- Peggy King – 1950s and 1960s pop singer
- Lydia B Kollins – drag queen
- John Latta (1836–1913) – First Lieutenant Governor of Pennsylvania
- Rocco Mediate – professional golfer
- Vic Mignogna – voice actor
- Rikki & Vikki Mongeon, known as the Ikki Twins
- Doug Plank - American football player
- Arthur St. Clair (1737–1818), US general, 9th President of the Continental Congress
- Jacob Turney (1825–1891), U.S. Congressman
- Bruce Weber – fashion photographer
- James C. White – radio personality
- Cyrus E. Woods – politician
- Jacob Zimmerman – Illinois politician, newspaper owner

== Sister cities ==
Greensburg has two sister cities, as designated by Sister Cities International:

- – Belize City, Belize
- – Cercemaggiore, Molise, Italy

== See also ==
- Academy Hill Historic District
- Arnold Palmer Regional Airport
- Greensburg Downtown Historic District
- Kecksburg UFO Incident
- Seton Hill University
- University of Pittsburgh at Greensburg
