= Mike Knode =

American football and baseball player (1895–1980)

Kenneth Thomson Knode
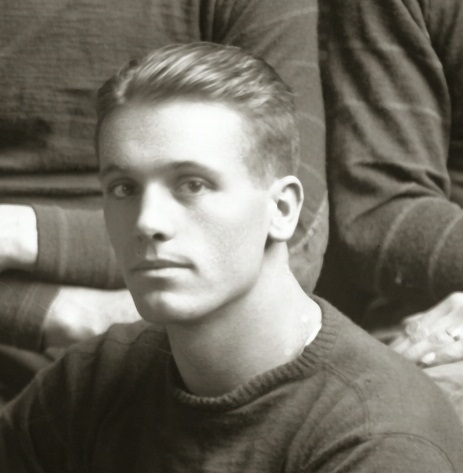
- Infielder
- Born: November 8, 1895; Westminster, Maryland, US
- Died: December 20, 1980 (aged 85); South Bend, Indiana, US
- Batted: Right Threw: Right

MLB debut
- June 28, 1920, for the St. Louis Cardinals

Last MLB appearance
- September 26, 1920, for the St. Louis Cardinals

MLB statistics
- At bats: 65
- RBI: 12
- On-base percentage: .306
- Batting average: .231
- Stats at Baseball Reference

Teams
- St. Louis Cardinals 1920

Kenneth Thomson "Mike" Knode (November 8, 1895 – December 20, 1980) was an American football and baseball player.

Knode was born in Westminster, Maryland, in 1895. He attended both the University of Maryland and University of Michigan, playing football and baseball at both institutions. At Michigan, he was the starting quarterback of the undefeated 1918 Michigan Wolverines football team that was recognized as the national championship team of the 1918 college football season. He scored Michigan's final touchdown against Michigan Agricultural College in 1918 on a 30-yard run after faking a pass.

In 1915, Knode began playing professional baseball for the Martinsburg Champs of the Blue Ridge League. Knode played under the alias of Kenny Thompson in order to keep his college eligibility. A second baseman, it was widely known by the local newspapers that Thompson was in reality Knode, but this information never reached the Midwest. At that time, Knode also was the team captain of the University of Michigan football eleven. In the dead ball era of the early twentieth century, Knode's three home runs tied him for third place in the Blue Ridge League in 1915. In 1916, he played professional baseball for the Cumberland Colts of the Potomac League.

In 1920, he played Major League Baseball as a right fielder, second baseman and shortstop for the St. Louis Cardinals. In 42 games, he accumulated a .231 batting average and a .306 on-base percentage.

His younger brother Robert Knode also played quarterback for the Michigan Wolverines football team, and played for the Cleveland Indians from 1923 to 1926.

Knode later became a pediatrician. Knode died on December 20, 1980, in South Bend, Indiana, at the age of 85. He was buried in Violett Cemetery in Goshen, Indiana.

The University of Maryland Athletic Hall of Fame posthumously inducted Knode in 1985.
