= Ward Brennan =

American basketball player, official, and coach

Biographical details
- Born: September 9, 1885; Newburgh, New York, U.S.
- Died: January 16, 1960 (aged 74); White Plains, New York

Playing career

Basketball
- 1904–1908: St. George A. C.
- 1907–1908: Danbury
- 1909–1910: Pittsburgh South Side
- 1910: Hudson Mixers

Baseball
- 1909: Waterbury Invincibles

Coaching career (HC unless noted)

Basketball
- 1923–1924: New York State Institute of Applied Agriculture
- 1924–1925: Manhattan
- 1927–1929: Freeport HS (NY)

Football
- 1927: Freeport HS (NY)

Peter Ward Brennan (September 9, 1885 – January 16, 1960) was an American basketball player, official, coach, and recreation supervisor.

== Playing ==
Brennan began his basketball career with the Fifth Separate Juniors in Newburgh, New York. He later played center for the St. George Athletic Club of Jersey City, New Jersey. He played in Danbury, Connecticut in 1907 and for the Pittsburgh South Side in 1909. In 1910, he signed with the Hudson club of the Hudson River Valley League.

Brennan also played minor league baseball for the Waterbury Invincibles in 1909.

== Officiating ==
Brennan spent nearly 15 years as a college and professional basketball official. He officiated in the New York State, Interstate, and Connecticut Basketball Leagues. He was described as the "one of basketball's best referees" by Reach Guide and "the best basketball referee in the East" by the Wilkes-Barre Record. According to author Murry R. Nelson, Brennan was "the only referee to approach (Herman) Baetzel in stature" during the 1910s and 1920s.

== Coaching and recreation supervision ==
In 1914, Brennan was hired as a supervisor of recreation in the Brooklyn parks department. In 1917, he became a physical education instructor at the Pratt Institute. During World War I, he was the recreational director at Camp Mills. He was later the athletic director of the New York State Institute of Applied Agriculture. During the 1924–25 season, he was the head coach of the Manhattan Jaspers men's basketball team and led them to a 10–10 record. In 1927, he was named as head basketball coach at Freeport High School. The following year, he was appointed supervisor of recreational facilities for the Long Island State Park Commission by Robert Moses. In 1930, he became the supervisor of the pool at the Hotel St. George. He joined the United Service Organizations shortly after its formation and in 1942 was named USO director for the Shenango Personnel Replacement Depot.

== Later life ==
Brennan spent the final ten years of his life in White Plains, New York, where he worked as a security guard for the Pinkerton National Detective Agency. He died on January 16, 1960 at his home.
