= Grafton Wanderers =

- 1907–1910; Grafton, West Virginia

Minor league affiliations
- Previous classes: Class D
- League: West Virginia League (1910)
- Previous leagues: Pennsylvania–West Virginia League (1908–1909); Western Pennsylvania League (1907)

Team data
- Previous names: Grafton (1909–1910); Grafton Wanderers (1908); Scottdale Millers (1908); Scottdale Giants (1907)

The Grafton Wanderers were a Pennsylvania–West Virginia League baseball team based in Grafton, West Virginia that played in 1908 and 1909. To begin the 1908 season, they were known as the Scottdale Millers, based in Scottdale, Pennsylvania. In 1910, an un-nicknamed Grafton team based in Grafton played in the West Virginia League. The Wanderers were Grafton's first professional baseball team ever. The 1910 squad was its last to date.

Notable players include Bert James, Buck Washer, Del Gainer, John Hinton, Bobby Rothermel and Guy Zinn.
