= Pennsylvania–West Virginia League =

Historical US baseball league

- Classification: Class D (1908–1909); Independent (1914)
- Sport: Minor League Baseball
- First season: 1908
- Folded: 1914
- President: James D. Groninger (1908–1909); Hugh A. McKinnon (1914)
- No. of teams: 9
- Country: United States
- Most titles: 1 Clarksburg Drummers (1908); Uniontown Coal Barons (1909); Connellsville Cokers (1914)
- Related competitions: Pennsylvania-Ohio-Maryland League

The Pennsylvania–West Virginia League was a professional minor league baseball league that consisted of teams based in Pennsylvania and West Virginia. It played from 1908 to 1909 as a Class D level league and again in 1914 as an Independent league.

== Teams ==
- Charleroi, PA: Charleroi Cherios (1908); Charleroi (1909, 1914)
- Clarksburg, WV: Clarksburg Drummers (1908); Clarksburg Bees (1909, 1914)
- Connellsville, PA: Connellsville Cokers (1908–1909, 1914)
- Fairmont, WV: Fairmont Badies (1908); Fairmont Champions (1909) Fairmont (1914)
- Grafton, WV: Grafton Wanderers (1909); Grafton Wanderers (1908)
- McKeesport, PA: McKeesport Royals (1914)
- Parkersburg, WV: Parkersburg Parkers (1909)
- Scottdale, PA: Scottdale Millers (1908)
- Uniontown, PA: Uniontown Coal Barons (1908–1909): Uniontown (1914)

== League champions ==
- Clarksburg was the league champion in 1908
- Uniontown was the league champion in 1909
- The 1914 league champion were the Connellsville Cokers.

== Standings & statistics ==
=== 1908 to 1909 ===
1908 Pennsylvania–West Virginia League
schedule

| Team standings | W | L | PCT | GB | Managers |
|---|---|---|---|---|---|
| Uniontown Coal Barons | 68 | 41 | .624 | – | Frank Sisley |
| Clarksburg Drummers | 71 | 48 | .597 | 2 | Lucas Hogue / Ferdinand Drumm |
| Charleroi Cherubs | 56 | 53 | .514 | 12 | Arch Osborne |
| Connellsville Cokers | 54 | 56 | .491 | 14½ | H.E. Irwin / W. Marietta; Milt Montgomery |
| Fairmont Badies | 55 | 64 | .462 | 18 | Thomas Haymond / Reddy Mack; Walter Snodgrass |
| Scottdale Millers / Grafton Wanderers | 36 | 78 | .316 | 34½ | Duff Buttermore |

Scottdale (24–46) moved to Grafton July 21.
Playoff: Clarksburg 3 games, Uniontown 1.

Player statistics
| Player | Team | Stat | Tot |
|---|---|---|---|
| Joe Phillips | Uniontown | BA | .307 |
| Elmer Jacobson | Scottdale/Grafton | Hits | 119 |
| Fred Dawson | Clarksburg | Runs | 80 |

1909 Pennsylvania–West Virginia League

| Team standings | W | L | PCT | GB | Managers |
|---|---|---|---|---|---|
| Uniontown Coal Barons | 63 | 44 | .589 | – | Frank Sisley / Charles McCloskey |
| Fairmont Champions | 58 | 50 | .537 | 5½ | Louis Hunt |
| Grafton | 56 | 54 | .509 | 8½ | Duff Buttermore |
| Connellsville Cokers | 53 | 56 | .486 | 11 | Alexander Sweeney |
| Clarksburg Bees | 22 | 31 | .415 | NA | Fedinand Drumm |
| Charleroi / Parkersburg Parkers | 16 | 33 | .327 | NA | Fred Osborne / Frank McHale |

Charleroi (13–25) moved to Parkersburg June 30; Parkersburg and Clarksburg folded July 10
Playoff: Uniontown 4 games, Fairmont 3.

Player statistics
| Player | Team | Stat | Tot | Player | Team | Stat | Tot |
|---|---|---|---|---|---|---|---|
| Waldo Jackley | Fairmont | BA | .326 | Joe Phillips | Uniontown | W | 29 |
| Del Gainer | Grafton | Runs | 59 | Joe Phillips | Uniontown | Pct | .806; 29–7 |
| Joe Phillips | Uniontown | Hits | 127 | | | | |

=== 1914 ===
1914 Pennsylvania–West Virginia League
schedule

| Team standings | W | L | PCT | GB | Managers |
|---|---|---|---|---|---|
| Connellsville Cokers | 5 | 1 | .833 | – | James Mack |
| Fairmont | 3 | 2 | .600 | 1½ | George Needham |
| McKeesport Royals | 2 | 2 | .500 | 2 | NA |
| Clarksburg Bees | 3 | 4 | .429 | 2½ | Hugh Shannon |
| Charleroi | 2 | 3 | .400 | 2½ | Charles O'Day |
| Uniontown | 2 | 5 | .286 | 3½ | Fred Paige |

McKeesport & Charleroi folded May 26. The league folded June 1.
President McKinnon resigned May 25 when the league declined to be affiliated with the independent major Federal League, after having been denied protection by the National Association.
