= Groninger (surname) =

Groninger is a Dutch language habitational surname for someone from Groningen. Notable people with the name include:

- James Groninger (1880–1944), American attorney, baseball player, manager, and league president
- Marcel Groninger (1970), Dutch former footballer
