= Altoona Engineers =

- 1931; (May 23, 1931 – July 18, 1931); Altoona, Pennsylvania

Minor league affiliations
- Previous classes: Class C
- League: Middle Atlantic League

Team data
- Previous names: Beaver Falls Beavers (1931); Altoona Engineers (1931); Jeannette Jays (1926–1931)

The Altoona Engineers were a short-lived minor league baseball club based in Altoona, Pennsylvania. The team played for just part of the 1931 season in the Middle Atlantic League. The Engineers were only professional baseball team to represent the city between 1912 and 1996. They began the season as the Jeannette Jays, however after posting a 1-11 record, the Jays relocated to Altoona on May 23 to become the Engineers. On July 18, the team moved again, this time to Beaver Falls, Pennsylvania, and they finished the year as the Beaver Falls Beavers.

== Record ==
Year	Record	Finish	Manager	Playoff series
1931	32-96 overall	12th	Joe Phillips / Kemp Wicker	Jeannette Jays (1-11) moved to Altoona on May 23; Altoona became the Beaver Falls Beavers on July 18
