= Jeannette Jays =

- 1926–1937; (1926–1931, 1934, 1936–1937); Jeannette, Pennsylvania

Minor league affiliations
- Previous classes: Class D (1934, 1936–1937); Class C (1926–1931)
- League: Pennsylvania State Association (1934–1937)
- Previous leagues: Middle Atlantic League (1926–1931)

Major league affiliations
- Previous teams: Pittsburgh Pirates (1936); Cincinnati Reds (1934)

Minor league titles
- League titles: 1 (1936)

Team data
- Previous names: Jeannette Bisons (1937); Jeannette Little Pirates (1936); Jeannette Reds (1934); Jeannette Jays (1926–1931)

The Jeannette Jays was the predominant name of a minor league baseball team located in Jeannette, Pennsylvania, between 1926 and 1937. The Jays first played in the Middle Atlantic League from 1926 until 1931. On May 23, 1931, The Jays with a 1-11 record, moved to Altoona, Pennsylvania, to become the short-lived Altoona Engineers. Then on July 18, 1931, the Engineers moved to nearby Beaver Falls to become the Beaver Falls Beavers.

After a three-year hiatus, the team played as the Jeannette Reds as an affiliate of the Cincinnati Reds in the Pennsylvania State Association. After a year off, they were known as the Jeannette Little Pirates, an affiliate of the Pittsburgh Pirates. The team was finally known as the Jeannette Bisons in 1937, before folding.

== Notable alumni ==
- Jess Cortazzo
- Jim Curry
- Rags Faircloth
- Ken Heintzelman
- Orville Jorgens
- Jerry Lynn
- Whitey Moore
- Red Nonnenkamp
- Jimmy Outlaw
- Jimmy Ripple
- Al Rubeling
- Art Scharein
- Phil Voyles
- Bud Weiser
- Kemp Wicker
- Rusty Yarnall

== Seasons ==
Year	Record	Finish	Manager	Playoff series
1926	45-64	7th	Jack Snyder / Warwick Comstock	
1927	48-65	7th	Jim Ferguson / Lee Strait / Elmer Knetzer	
1928	65-54	4th	Lee Strait	
1929	50-66	7th	Lee Strait / Leo Hanley	
1930	49-67	8th	Dan Pasquella	
1931	1-11	--	Joe Phillips	Team moved to Altoona Engineers on May 23, 1931
1934	59-47	2nd (t)	Ray Ryan	Lost 1st half championship playoff vs. Washington Generals (2-1)
1936	65-44	1st	Wilbur Cooper	Won League Championship vs.Greensburg Red Wings (4-3)
1937	13-11	--	Jake Pitler	Team disbanded on June 10
