= Scottdale Giants =

- 1907–1908; Scottdale, Pennsylvania

Minor league affiliations
- Previous classes: Class D
- Division: Pennsylvania–West Virginia League (1908)
- Previous leagues: Western Pennsylvania League (1907)

Team data
- Previous names: Grafton Wanderers (1908–1909); Scottdale Millers (1908); Scottdale Giants (1907)

The Scottdale Giants were a minor league baseball, based in Scottdale, Pennsylvania in 1907. That season the team was a member of the Western Pennsylvania League. However to begin the 1908 season, they were renamed the Scottdale Millers and moved into the Pennsylvania–West Virginia League. During the 1908 season, the team relocated to Grafton, West Virginia and became the Grafton Wanderers.
