= Manhattan Jaspers men's basketball =

College basketball team

2026–27 Manhattan Jaspers men's basketball team
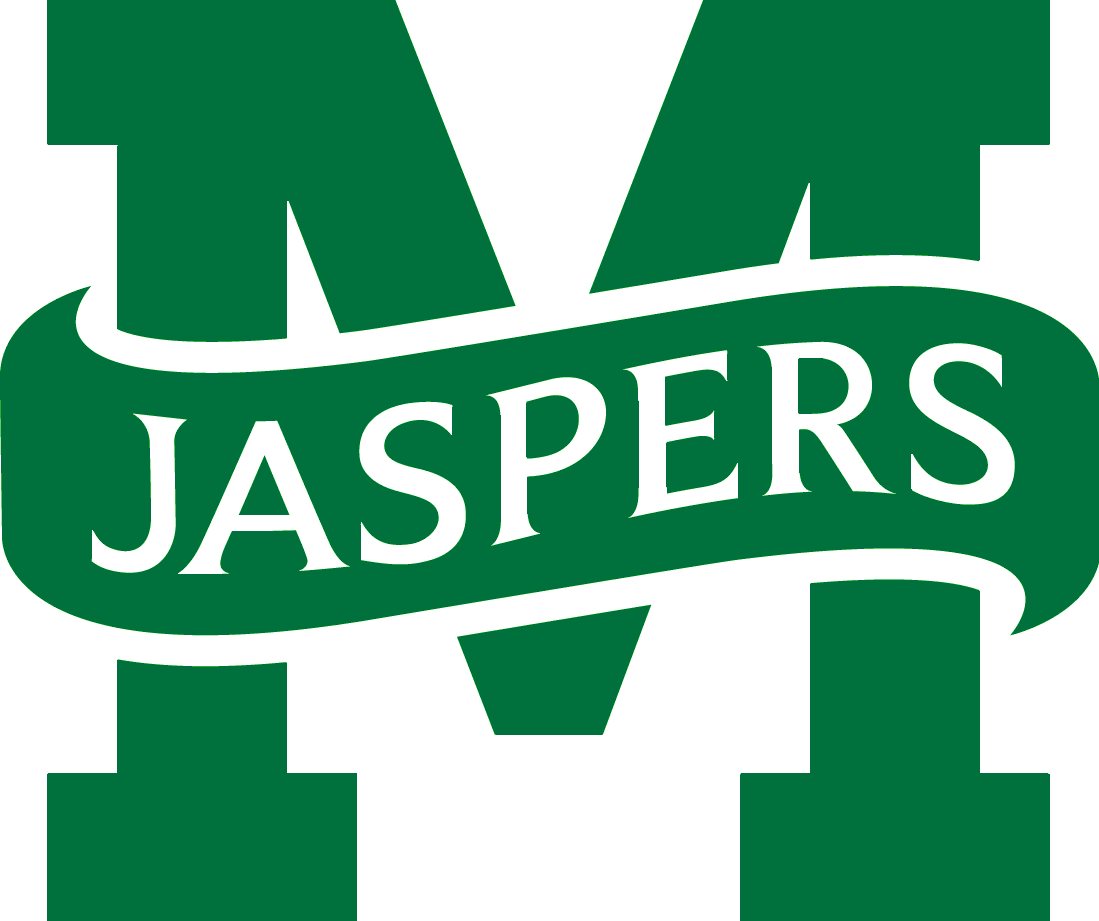
- University: Manhattan University
- Head coach: John Gallagher (3rd season)
- Location: Bronx, New York
- Arena: Draddy Gymnasium (capacity: 2,345)
- Conference: MAAC
- Nickname: Jaspers
- Colors: Green and white

NCAA Division I tournament Sweet Sixteen
- 1958

NCAA Division I tournament appearances
- 1956, 1958, 1993, 1995, 2003, 2004, 2014, 2015

Conference tournament champions
- 1993, 2003, 2004, 2014, 2015

Conference regular-season champions
- 1992, 1993, 1995, 2003, 2004, 2006; MCC: 1966, 1967, 1969; Metro NY: 1949, 1953, 1955, 1959

Uniforms
Home	Away

The Manhattan Jaspers men's basketball team is the basketball team that represents Manhattan University in The Bronx, New York City, New York, United States. The school's team currently competes in the Metro Atlantic Athletic Conference. They have won the Metro Atlantic Athletic Conference tournament championship five times (1993, 2003, 2004, 2014, 2015). The Jaspers have had three players named Metro Atlantic Athletic Conference Player of the Year, most recently Luis Flores in 2003. Luis Flores is also the Manhattan Jaspers all-time leading scorer with 2046 points from 2001 to 2004. Their current head coach is John Gallagher, who was hired from the University of Hartford in March 2023.

== History ==
Fran Fraschilla was head coach of the Jaspers from 1992, when he was 33 years old, to 1996, and his teams had an 85–35 record, a 71% won-lost percentage, and won two Metro Atlantic Athletic Conference (MAAC) titles and the 1993 MAAC men's basketball tournament championship. In 1995 the Jaspers became the first Jaspers team in 35 years to compete in the NCAA Basketball Tournament and the first team from the MAAC to obtain an at-large bid to the NCAA Tournament. There, they defeated the fourth-seeded Oklahoma Sooners in the first round, before losing in the second round to the Arizona State Sun Devils. Fraschilla was named the 1994–95 Metro Atlantic Athletic Conference Men's Basketball Coach of the Year, after his team's 26-5 season.

== Rivalries ==
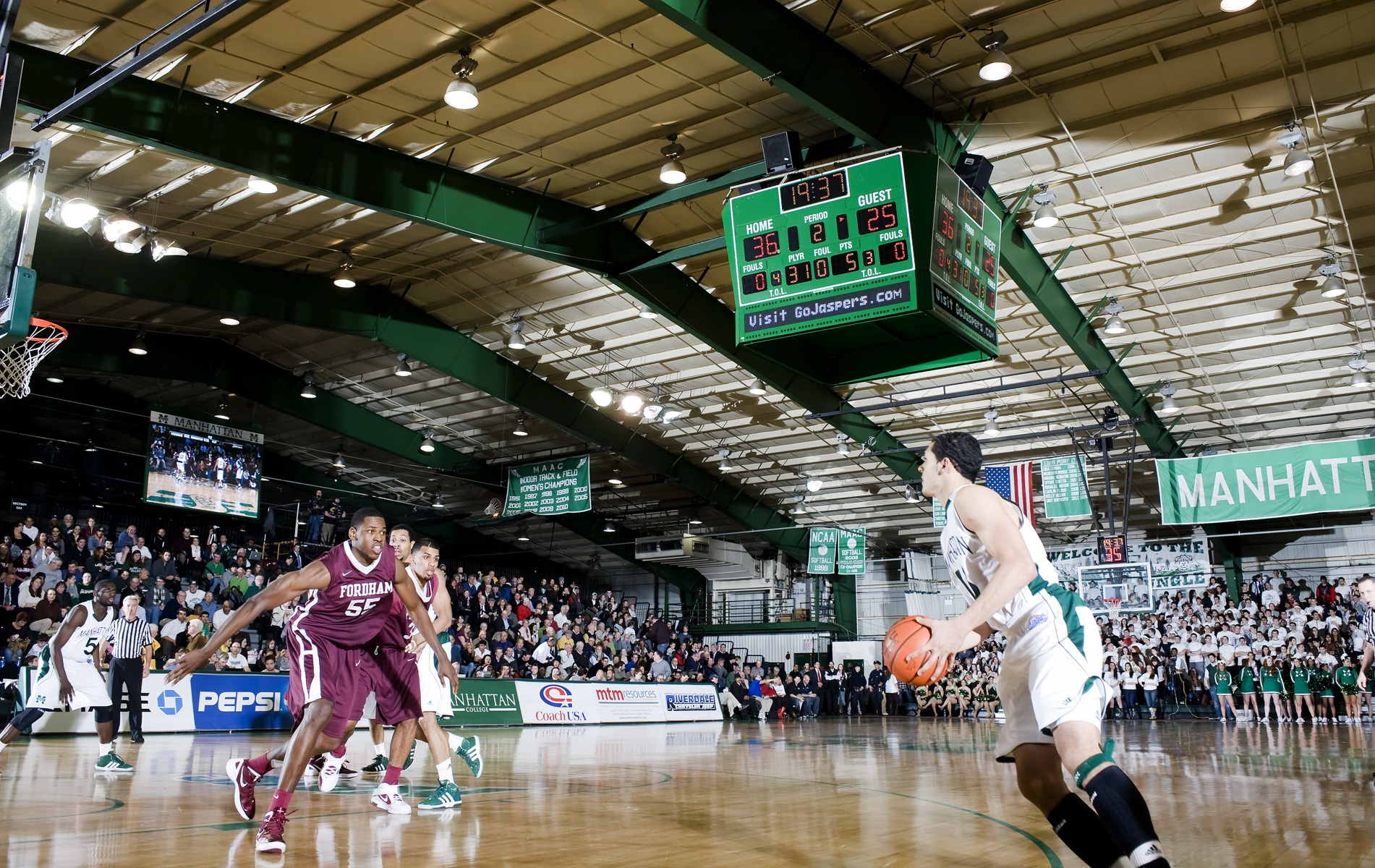
Manhattan University vs. Fordham University game in 2011

The Jaspers' main rivals are the Iona Gaels. This rivalry started in December 1946, which Manhattan won 69–62. Iona leads the all-time series 66–45 as of March 2026. They also enjoy a strong rivalry with the cross-borough Fordham Rams, whom they first played in the 1911–12 season and annually since the 1922–23 season. Although the Rams left the MAAC for the Atlantic 10 Conference in 1990, the "Battle of the Bronx" is still played almost every season. In the most recent matchup, the Rams won 82–53 against the Jaspers on December 13, 2025.

== Postseason ==
=== NCAA tournament results ===
The Jaspers have appeared in eight NCAA Tournaments. Their combined record is 3–9.

Year	Round	Opponent	Result
1956	First round	Connecticut	L 75–84
1958	First round Regional semifinal Regional 3rd-place game	West Virginia; Dartmouth; Maryland	W 89–84; L 62–79; L 55–59
1993	First round	Virginia	L 66–78
1995	First round Second round	Oklahoma; Arizona State	W 77–67; L 54–64
2003	First round	Syracuse	L 65–76
2004	First round Second round	Florida; Wake Forest	W 75–60; L 80–84
2014	First round	Louisville	L 64–71
2015	First Four	Hampton	L 64–74

=== NIT results ===
The Jaspers have appeared in 18 National Invitation Tournaments (NIT). Their combined record is 8–19.

Year	Round	Opponent	Result
1943	First round	Toledo	L 47–54
1949	First round	San Francisco	L 43–68
1953	Quarterfinals; Semifinals; Third-place game	Louisville; Seton Hall; Duquesne	W 79–66; L 56–74; L 67–81
1954	First round	Dayton	L 79–90
1955	First round	Louisville	L 86–91
1957	Quarterfinals	Memphis	L 73–85
1959	First round	Providence	L 66–68
1965	First round Quarterfinals	Texas Western; Villanova	W 71–53; L 71–73
1966	First round	Army	L 66–71
1970	First round Quarterfinals	North Carolina; Army	W 95–90; L 72–77
1973	First round	Alabama	L 86–87
1974	First round	Maryland–Eastern Shore	L 81–84
1975	First round Quarterfinals	Massachusetts; St. John's	W 68–51; L 56–57
1992	First round Second round Quarterfinals	Green Bay; Rutgers; Notre Dame	W 67–65; W 62–61; L 58–74
1994	First round	Old Dominion	L 74–76
1996	First round	Wisconsin	L 42–55
2002	First round	Villanova	L 69–84
2006	Opening Round; First round Second round	Fairleigh Dickinson; Maryland; Old Dominion	W 80–77; W 87–84; L 66–70

=== CBI results ===
The Jaspers have appeared in the College Basketball Invitational (CBI) one time. Their record is 0–1.

Year	Round	Opponent	Result
2025	First round	Incarnate Word	L 85–92

=== CIT results ===
The Jaspers have appeared in one CollegeInsider.com Postseason Tournament (CIT). Their combined record is 1–1.

Year	Round	Opponent	Result
2012	First round Second round	Albany; Fairfield	W 89–79; L 57–69

=== NAIA tournament results ===
The Jaspers have appeared in the NAIA Tournament once. Their combined record is 2–1.

Year	Round	Opponent	Result
1948	First round Second round Quarterfinals	Arkansas State Teachers; Southern Illinois; Hamline	W 65–60; W 52–42; L 51–60

== Head coach history ==
No.	Tenure	Coach	Years	Record	Pct.
1	1904–1909	John O'Donnell	5	22–33	.400
2	1910–1920	Edward Hanrahan	10	74–72	.507
3	1912–1913	Fred J. Murphy	1	8–10	.444
4	1921–1922	Paddy Winters	1	3–11	.214
5	1923–1926	Arthur Carroll	3	26–21	.553
6	1924–1925	Ward Brennan	1	10–10	.500
7	1926–1928	Chief Muller	2	22–12	.647
8	1928–1929	James Houlihan	1	4–11	.267
9	1929–1942	Neil Cohalan*	12	165–83	.665
10	1942–1943	Joseph Daher	1	18–3	.857
11	1945–1946	Honey Russell	1	15–8	.652
12	1946–1968	Ken Norton	22	300–205	.594
13	1968–1978	John Powers	10	142–114	.555
15	1978–1981	Brian Mahoney*	3	16–62	.205
16	1981–1985	Gordon Chiesa	4	43–68	.387
17	1985–1986	Tom Sullivan	1	2–26	.071
18	1986–1988	Bob Delle Bovi	2	13–44	.228
20	1992–1996	Fran Fraschilla	4	86–34	.717
21	1996–1999	John Leonard	3	26–57	.313
22	1999–2006	Bobby Gonzalez	7	129–77	.626
23	2006–2011	Barry Rohrssen	5	58–95	.379
24	2011–2022	Steve Masiello^	11	162–177	.478
25	2022–2023	RaShawn Stores*^	1	12–18	.400
26	2023–present	John Gallagher	3	36–57	.387
Totals		26 coaches	120 seasons	1,457–1,371	.515
Records updated through end of 2023–24 season Source; *Alum^Promoted from assistant to head coach

== 1951 college basketball point-shaving scandal ==
In 1951, Manhattan College star center Junius Kellogg was offered a $1,000 bribe to shave points in a game against DePaul. Though he was earning only minimum wage working at a frozen custard shop near campus, Kellogg refused the offer and immediately reported it to Manhattan coach Ken Norton. Working with investigators, Kellogg wore a wire during a meeting with fixer Henry “Hank” Poppe, who openly described the point-shaving scheme. The evidence led to the arrests of Poppe, Manhattan co-captain John Byrnes, and several gambling figures, exposing efforts to manipulate Manhattan games.

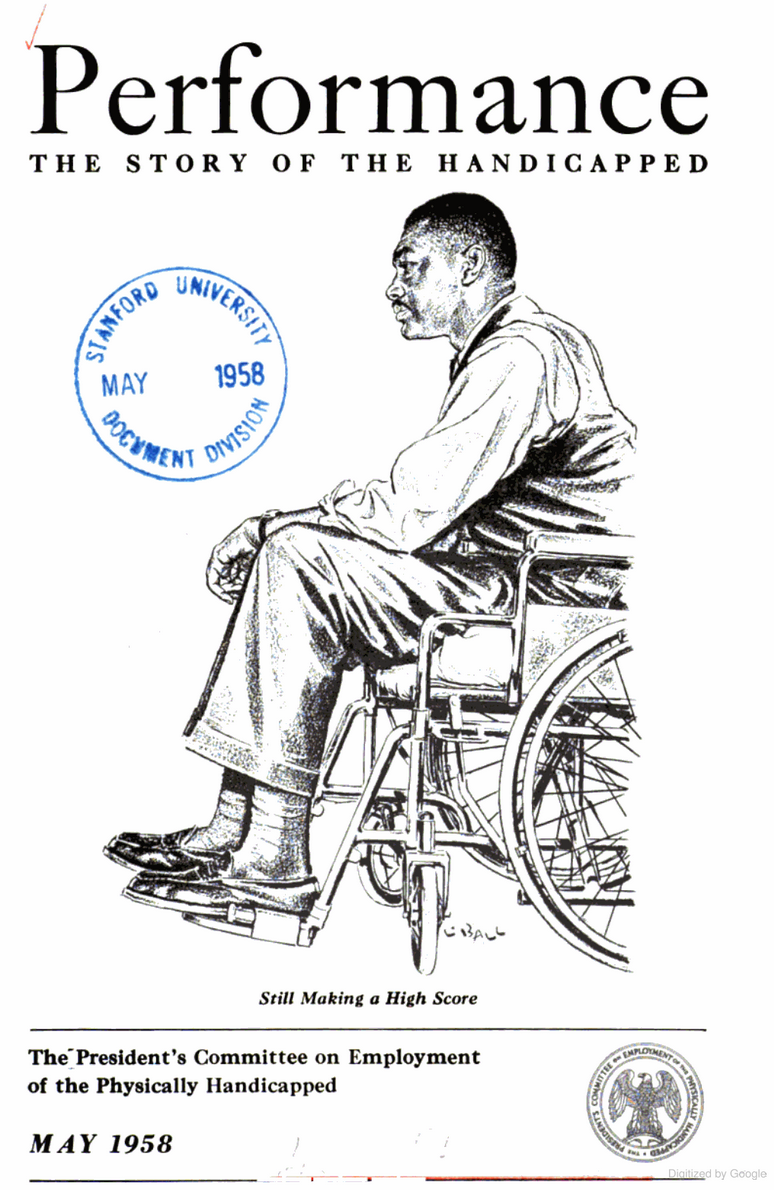
Junius Kellogg

Kellogg’s courage helped ignite an investigation that uncovered the massive 1951 college basketball point-shaving scandal, which ultimately implicated players from several major programs. Dozens of players were arrested or banned, and the revelations rocked college basketball nationwide.

After his role in uncovering the 1951 point shaving scandal,Kellogg left college for the army, serving in the Korean War, before returning to graduate in 1953. He subsequently joined the Harlem Globetrotters. In 1954 while traveling with the team he suffered a cervical spinal cord injury and as paralyzed in a car accident. He became an ardent supporter of wheelchair basketball culminating in head coaching Team USA to the 1964 Paralympic gold medal.
