= Butler (basketball) =

Butler was a semi-pro American basketball team based in Butler, Pennsylvania that was a member of the Central Basketball League. Butler played just one season (1906−1907) before dropping out of the league.

== Year-by-year ==
Year	League	Reg. season	Playoffs
1906/07	CBL	5th (Regular Season); 4th (Postseason Series)	Did not qualify
