= Mannington Drillers =

- 1910; Mannington, West Virginia

Minor league affiliations
- Previous classes: Class D
- League: West Virginia League

The Mannington Drillers were a minor league baseball team that represented Mannington, West Virginia in the Class D West Virginia League. The team placed second in the league standings but existed for only the 1910 season and was Mannington's only professional baseball team to date. The team is also listed as just Mannington in several sources.

== Year-by-year record ==
Year	Record	Finish	Manager	Notes
1910	33-21	2nd	George Pritchard & Charles McCloskey	
