= James Gronninger =

American lawyer

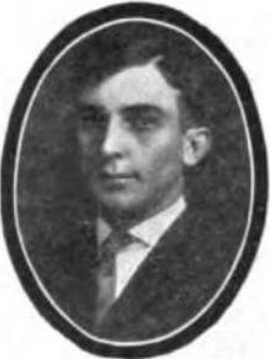
Groninger from 1908 Reach Guide

James Davis Gronninger (January 15, 1880 – January 30, 1944) was an American attorney, baseball player, manager, and league president.

== Early years ==
Gronninger was born at Lucasville, Ohio, in January 1880. His parents John and Rachel Gronninger were both Ohio natives. At the time of the 1900 United States census, Gronninger was working as a laborer in a rolling mill in Ohio.

== West Virginia University ==
Gronninger played college baseball at West Virginia University starting no later than 1903. He was the captain of West Virginia's 1906 team. He was a multi-sport athlete at West Virginia and also served as captain of the West Virginia Mountaineers basketball team.

== Baseball coach and executive ==
Gronninger received his law degree (Bachelor of Laws) from West Virginia in June 1906. He remained in Morgantown, West Virginia, as the coach of the school's baseball team. He also served as the manager of the Uniontown Coal Barons in 1906, leading them to a Pennsylvania–Ohio–Maryland League championship. He served as the president of the Class-D Pennsylvania–West Virginia League in 1908 and 1909.

== Legal and civil service career ==
After retiring from baseball, Gronninger became a lawyer. In 1917, he was the chief clerk in the office of West Virginia Secretary of State. By September 1918, he was the Assistant Secretary of State of West Virginia. In 1921, he had the second highest salary ($2,750) in the Secretary of State's Office behind the Secretary of State. In 1923, he was in charge of enforcing West Virginia's securities laws and prosecuting stock fraud. Gronninger in his later years was a lawyer with a general practice at Charleston, West Virginia. He died at Huntington, West Virginia, in January 1944 at age 63.
