= Rusty Yarnall =

American baseball player

- Pitcher
- Born: October 22, 1902; Chicago, Illinois, U.S.
- Died: October 9, 1985 (aged 82); Lowell, Massachusetts, U.S.
- Batted: Right Threw: Right

MLB debut
- June 30, 1926, for the Philadelphia Phillies

Last MLB appearance
- June 30, 1926, for the Philadelphia Phillies

MLB statistics
- Earned run average: 18.00
- Win–loss record: 0-1
- Strikeouts: 0
- Stats at Baseball Reference

Teams
- Philadelphia Phillies (1926)

Waldo Ward "Rusty" Yarnall (October 22, 1902 – October 9, 1985) was an American professional baseball pitcher. He appeared in one game in Major League Baseball for the Philadelphia Phillies in 1926. He was a right-handed thrower and batter. During his career, he was measured at 6 ft 0 in (1.83 m) in height and 175 lbs in weight. He attended Dartmouth College and the University of Vermont.

Yarnall made his professional debut in 1924 with the York White Roses of the New York–Pennsylvania League. In 1926, Yarnall was acquired by the Phillies from the Martinsville Blue Sox. His only major league appearance came on June 30, 1926, at age 23.

Yarnall was brought into a game against the Brooklyn Robins with the Phillies down 5–2 in the 4th inning. He pitched a scoreless inning, and in the top of the 5th struck out in what would be his only major league plate appearance. During that inning, the Phillies scored four runs to take a 6–5 lead, and Yarnall came out to start the bottom of the 5th. When the first two Robins batters reached base, he was relieved by Jack Knight. Both runners came around to score, and the Phillies lost the game 11–9, with Yarnall taking the loss. He finished the game with one inning pitched, two runs, three hits and one walk allowed, and an earned run average of 18.00.

After his one-game major league career, Yarnall returned to minor league baseball with the Jeannette Jays, and continued to play in the minors on and off until 1933. He also coached baseball, football and basketball while also teaching economics at the Lowell Textile Institute, which later became the Lowell Technological Institute. He became the school's athletic director in 1953, retiring in 1966.
