= Greensburg Red Sox =

- 1907; Greensburg, Pennsylvania

Minor league affiliations
- Previous classes: Class D
- League: Western Pennsylvania League

Team data
- Previous parks: Athletic Field

The Greensburg Red Sox, based in Greensburg, Pennsylvania, were a professional minor league baseball team that played in the Western Pennsylvania League in 1907.

They were the first professional baseball team to be based in Greensburg. When the team folded after the league's only season in existence, the city would not have another professional baseball team until 1934, when the Greensburg Trojans were established as an affiliate of the St. Louis Cardinals.

Notable players include major leaguers Red Bowser, and Huck Wallace, who managed the team in 1907.

== Seasons ==
Year	Record	Finish	Manager	Notes
1907	42-50	NA	Anderson / Bill Powell / Huck Wallace	Team disbanded August 25
