= Canton (basketball) =

Canton was an American basketball team based in Canton, Ohio that was a member of the Central Basketball League. The team replaced the Homestead Young Americans during the 1906/07 Postseason Series.

== Year-by-year ==
Year	League	Reg. season	Playoffs
1906/07	CBL	6th (Postseason Series)	Did not qualify
