= Charleroi Cherios =

- 1906–1914; (1906–1909, 1914); Charleroi, Pennsylvania

Minor league affiliations
- Previous classes: Class D
- League: Pennsylvania–West Virginia League (1908–1909, 1914); Pennsylvania–Ohio–Maryland League (1906–1907)

Team data
- Previous names: Charleroi (1914); Charleroi Cherios (1908–1909); Charleroi (1906–1907)

The Charleroi Cherios, as referred to as the Charleroi Cherubs, were a professional baseball team that played in the Pennsylvania–West Virginia League in 1908. Based in Charleroi, Pennsylvania, USA. The team can be traced to an un-nicknamed team that played in the Pennsylvania–Ohio–Maryland League in 1906 and 1907. During the 1909 season, Charleroi posted a 13-25. However, on June 30, 1909 the club moved to Parkersburg, West Virginia to become the Parkersburg Parkers. then was dropped July 10, after Clarksburg disbanded. In 1914 a team based in Charleroi played in the revived Pennsylvania–West Virginia League, however it did not have a nickname, either. On May 26, 1914, both Charleroi and the McKeesport Royals disbanded. The league then folded soon afterwards on June 1, 1914.

Baseball pitcher Bert Humphries, who played in the major leagues from 1910 to 1915, played for the unnamed Charleroi team in 1907 and the Cherios in 1908. He posted a won-loss record of 13-15 in the latter season.
