= Parkersburg Parkers =

- (1909–1910, 1931); Parkersburg, West Virginia

Minor league affiliations
- Previous classes: Class C (1931); Class D (1909–1910)
- League: Middle Atlantic League (1931); Virginia Valley League (1910); Pennsylvania–West Virginia League (1909)

The Parkersburg Parkers were a minor league baseball team based in Parkersburg, West Virginia. They played in the Pennsylvania–West Virginia League in 1909. The team was founded when the Charleroi Cherios relocated to Parkersburg on June 30, 1909. However the team was short-lived and were dropped by the league on July 10, 1909. The club was soon reestablished and played in the Virginia Valley League in 1910. Another team with that name surfaced in the Middle Atlantic League in 1931, when the Hagerstown Hubs relocated to Parkersburg on July 28, 1931. However the team relocated again soon afterwards to Youngstown, Ohio to become the Youngstown Tubers on July 12, 1931.

Benny Kauff played for the team in 1910. Babe Phelps and Tommy Thompson were with the squad in 1931.
