= Uniontown Coal Barons =

- 1906–1949; (1906–1909, 1914, 1926, 1947–1949); Uniontown, Pennsylvania

Minor league affiliations
- Previous classes: Class C (1926, 1947–1949); Class D (1906–1909, 1914)
- League: Middle Atlantic League (1926, 1947–1949); Penn.-West Virginia League (1908–1909, 1914); Penn.-Ohio-Maryland League (1906–1907)

Major league affiliations
- Previous teams: Pittsburgh Pirates (1947–1949)

Minor league titles
- League titles: 3 (1906, 1908, 1909)

Team data
- Previous names: Uniontown Coal Barons (1947–1949); Uniontown Cokers (1926); Uniontown (1914); Uniontown Coal Barons (1906–1909)

The Uniontown Coal Barons were a Pennsylvania–Ohio–Maryland League (1906–1907), Pennsylvania–West Virginia League (1908–1909 and 1914) and Middle Atlantic League (1926, 1947–1949) baseball team based in Uniontown, Pennsylvania. From 1947 to 1949, they were affiliated with the Pittsburgh Pirates.

Under manager James Groninger, they won a league championship in 1906. Under manager Frank Sisley they won a league championship in 1909.

In 1926, the team was called simply Uniontown in 1914 and the Uniontown Cokers in 1926.
