= Homestead Young Americans =

Early 20th-century basketball team in Pennsylvania, USA

The Homestead Young Americans were an American basketball team based in Homestead, Pennsylvania that was a member of the Central Basketball League.

The team was replaced by Canton during the 1906/07 Postseason Series, but returned to the league the following season. For their final season, the team was known as the Homestead Steeltowners. The team experienced significant financial troubles in the 1910-11 season, leading to the team failing to pay its players and the players refusing to play. The team dropped out of the league that season and forfeited their final 10 games.

== Year-by-year ==
Year	League	Reg. season	Playoffs
1906/07	CBL	4th (Regular Season)	N/A
1907/08	CBL	3rd	No playoff
1908/09	CBL	1st	Champion (no playoff)
1909/10	CBL	4th	No playoff
1910/11	CBL	5th	No playoff
