= Harry Hough =

American basketball player and coach

Personal information
- Born: June 1, 1883 Trenton, New Jersey, U.S.
- Died: April 20, 1935 (aged 51)
- Listed height: 5 ft 8 in (1.73 m)

Harry Douglass Hough (June 1, 1883 – April 20, 1935) was a professional basketball player and college coach. He played professionally for 22 seasons and is considered the first dominant player in the pro game.

In 1908 the Pittsburgh South Side team paid him $300 a month to play for them, making him the highest paid basketball player in the world. He also served as the head coach at the University of Pittsburgh Panthers basketball team during the 1907–08 season guiding his team to a 10–6 record, while also attending the university's chemistry department. He also coached at Princeton University during the 1910–11 season.

In the 1909–10 season, playing for Pittsburgh South Side in the Central Basketball League Hough made 963 free throws, the most free throws recorded by any professional player in a single season. In that era each team designated a player to shoot all team free throws.
