= West Virginia League =

- Sport: Minor league baseball
- Founded: 1910
- Folded: 1910
- No. of teams: 4
- Country: USA
- Most titles: 1 Fairmont Champions (1910

The West Virginia League was a Class D level minor baseball league that played during the 1910 season. It featured four teams, all from West Virginia - the Clarksburg Bees of Clarksburg, the Fairmont Champions of Fairmont the Grafton team based in Grafton and the Mannington Drillers based in Mannington.

The league disbanded on July 5 after Grafton disbanded. In the shortened season, Fairmont finished first in the standings with a 37-18 record, while Mannington was second with a 33-21 mark, Grafton was third at 20-30 and Clarksburg was last with a 14-35 record. Future major leaguer Everett Scott played in the league.

== Cities represented ==
- Clarksburg, WV: Clarksburg Bees 1910
- Fairmont, WV: Fairmont Champions 1910
- Grafton, WV: Grafton 1910
- Mannington, WV: Mannington Drillers 1910

== Standings & statistics ==
1910 West Virginia League
schedule

Team standings	W	L	PCT	GB	Managers
Fairmont Champions	37	18	.673	--	Lewis Hunt
Mannington Drillers	33	21	.611	3.5	George Pritchard / Charles McClosky
Grafton	20	30	.400	14.5	Dan Raily
Clarksburg Bees	14	35	.286	20.0	Bull Smith

The league disbanded July 5 after Grafton disbanded.
