= Washington Georges =

American basketball team

The Washington Georges was an American basketball team based in Washington, Ohio that was a member of the Central Basketball League.

In their only season, the team dropped out of the league after going 0-30.

== Year-by-year ==
Year	League	Reg. season	Playoffs
1911/12	CBL	6th	No playoff
