= Fairmont Black Diamonds =

- 1907–1931; (1907–1910, 1912, 1914, 1925–1931); Fairmont, West Virginia

Minor league affiliations
- Previous classes: Class C (1925–1931); Class D (1907–1910, 1912, 1914)
- Previous leagues: Middle Atlantic League (1925–1931); Pennsylvania–West Virginia League (1914); Ohio–Pennsylvania League (1912); West Virginia League (1910); Pennsylvania–West Virginia League (1908–1909); Western Pennsylvania League (1907)

Minor league titles
- League titles: 1928

Team data
- Previous names: Fairmont Black Diamonds (1926–1931); Fairmont Maroons (1925); Fairmont (1914); Fairmont Fairies (1912); Salem Quakers (1912); Fairmont Champions (1909–1910); Fairmont Badies (1908); Fairmont Champions (1907)

The Fairmont Black Diamonds were an American minor league baseball team based in Fairmont, West Virginia. They played under several names between 1907 and 1931.

They played in the Western Pennsylvania League in 1907, the Pennsylvania–West Virginia League in 1909 and 1914, the West Virginia League in 1910, the Ohio–Pennsylvania League in 1912 and the Middle Atlantic League from 1925–1931. They were known as the Fairmont Badies in 1908. In 1914, a team known only as Fairmont played once again in the Pennsylvania–West Virginia League. The team posted a 3-2 record, before the league ceased operations on June 1, 1914.

Notable players include major leaguers Reddy Mack, who managed the team in 1907 and Everett Scott.
