= Pittsburgh South Side =

The Pittsburgh South Side was an American basketball team that was based in Pittsburgh, Pennsylvania. It was a member of the Central Basketball League and the various incarnations of the Western Pennsylvania Basketball League.

== History ==
The Pittsburgh South Side basketball team was formed in 1899. Joe Leithead was chosen by the South Side Y.M.C.A. to choose players for the new team. Its first members were Bradley, Leithead, Liebau, O'Donnell, Schmidt, Stamm, and Windeknecht. The team finished its first year in second place.

During its second year, the team lost only one game as it won the junior league championship; during its third year, it was undefeated.

The Pittsburgh South Side twice defeated the Buffalo Germans, whose members once claimed that they had never lost a series to any team. The team dropped out of the league late during the 1911–1912 season.

The South Siders won the Western Pennsylvania League championship in 1904 and 1913 and were co-champions of the Central League in 1905.

== Notable people ==
The South Side team made national headlines when it made Harry Hough the highest-paid basketball player in the world on December 31, 1907. It signed him to a contract that paid him $300 per month to play eight league games per month (that's roughly $6,819 a month or $81,800 a year in 2009 dollars past to present currency converter).

Joseph "Joe" Meech Leithead (born July 17, 1882; died July 2, 1958) played and served as coach and captain of the Pittsburgh South Side team from 1899 through 1907.

== Year-by-year ==
Year	League	Reg. season	Playoffs
1903/04	WPBL	1st	Champion (no playoff)
1906/07	CBL	3rd (Regular Season); 1st (Postseason Series)	Co-champion
1907/08	CBL	2nd	No playoff
1908/09	CBL	3rd	No playoff
1909/10	CBL	5th	No playoff
1910/11	CBL	2nd	No playoff
1911/12	CBL	5th	No playoff
1912/13	WPBL	1st	Champion (no playoff)
1914/15	WPBL	2nd	No playoff

== Gallery ==
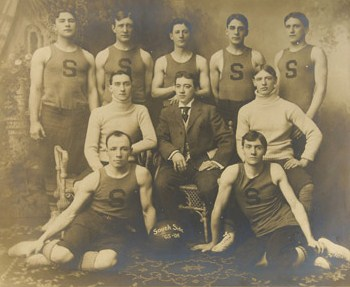
Joe Leithead, seated second row left in turtleneck, c. 1905-1906

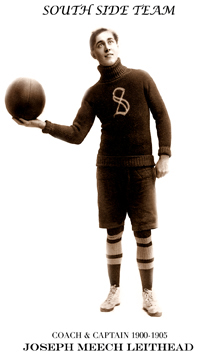
Joe Leithead, c. 1905-1906
