= Clarksburg Generals =

- 1907–1931; (1907–1910, 1914, 1925–1932); Clarksburg, West Virginia

Minor league affiliations
- Previous classes: Class C (1925–1932); Class D (1907–1910, 1914)
- Previous leagues: Middle Atlantic League (1925–1932); Pennsylvania–West Virginia League (1914); West Virginia League (1910); Pennsylvania–West Virginia League (1908–1909); Western Pennsylvania League (1907)

Team data
- Previous names: Clarksburg Generals (1926–1932); Clarksburg Cyrians (1925); Clarksburg Ghosts (1925); Clarksburg (1914); Clarksburg Bees (1909–1910); Clarksburg Drummers (1908); Clarksburg Bees (1907)
- Previous parks: Fank Loria Field

The Clarksburg Generals were an American minor league baseball team based in Clarksburg, West Virginia. They played from 1907 to 1910, in 1914 and from 1925 to 1932 under different names.

They played in the Western Pennsylvania League in 1907, the Pennsylvania–West Virginia League in 1909 and the West Virginia League in 1910. In 1908, they were known as the Clarksburg Drummers. They were the first known professional baseball to be based in Clarksburg.

Notable players include Jim Clark, Dick Hoblitzell, Sam Fletcher (who played for the Drummers), George McAvoy (Drummers), Bill Bailey and Barney Wolfe. Bull Smith managed them in 1910.
