= Rebecca Franklin =

American food writer

Rebecca Franklin is a Pittsburgh, Pennsylvania-based food writer for About.com, and various other media outlets. She has been freelance writing for food, travel and health publications for nine years. Her specialties include European food - French cuisine is her expertise - and American regional cooking. Her easy recipes are a blend of old-fashioned, homestyle dishes updated with modern flavor combinations. In her biography, Franklin emphasizes that she wants her readers to "get comfortable with the recipes... you'll find yourself becoming creative with the dishes you prepare."
