= McKeesport Tubers =

The McKeesport Tubers were an American basketball team based in McKeesport, Pennsylvania that was a member of the Central Basketball League.

== Year-by-year record ==
Year	League	Reg. season	Playoffs
1906/07	CBL	6th (Regular Season); 3rd (Postseason Series)	Did not qualify
1907/08	CBL	5th	No playoff
1908/09	CBL	2nd	No playoff
1909/10	CBL	1st	Champion (no playoff)
1910/11	CBL	1st	Champion (no playoff)
