= Charleroi Cherubs =

American basketball team

Charleroi (also known as the Cherubs) was an American basketball team based in Charleroi, Pennsylvania that was a member of the Central Basketball League.

== Year-by-year ==
Year	League	Reg. season	Playoffs
1911/12	CBL	4th	No playoff
