= Cumberland Rooters =

- 1907; Latrobe, Pennsylvania Cumberland, Maryland Piedmont, West Virginia Somerset, Pennsylvania Kittanning, Pennsylvania

Minor league affiliations
- Previous classes: Class D
- League: Western Pennsylvania League

Team data
- Previous names: Kittanning Infants (1907); Somerset Infants (1907); Piedmont (1907); Cumberland Rooters (1907); Latobe (1907)

The Cumberland Rooters were a minor league baseball club that played for a short time in the Western Pennsylvania League in 1907. The team was established in Latrobe, Pennsylvania as a team listed only as Latrobe, prior to the start of the season. On May 28, 1907 the franchise was forfeited to the league after posting a 7-10 record. The league then awarded the franchise to Cumberland, Maryland, who fielded the Cumberland Rooters. The team posted a 5-20 record, before relocating to Piedmont, West Virginia on June 27, 1907, as a team listed only as Piedmont. The club posted a 4-6 record while playing in Piedmont. However the club relocated yet again on July 11, 1907 to Somerset, Pennsylvania to become the Somerset Infants. The Infants then posted an 0-5 record, before it disbanded later that July.

The franchise then became the Kittanning Infants and were based in Kittanning, Pennsylvania for just the last seven games in 1907. On August 1, 1907 club was formed as a member of the Western Pennsylvania League. During league play the Infants posted a 2-5 record. However the team disbanded on August 11, 1907.

== Year-by-year record ==
| Year | Record | Finish | Manager | Notes |
|---|---|---|---|---|
| 1907 Latrobe/Cumberland/ Piedmont/Somerset | 18-46 | NA | S. Whaley, William Morrow, Dillon, Curtis, Bill Malarkey | Disbanded in late July 1907 |
| 1907 Kittanning | 2-5 | NA | Bill Malarkey | Disbanded on August 11, 1907 |
