= Potomac League =

Baseball league in West Virginia and Maryland in 1916

- Classification: Class D (1916)
- Sport: Minor League Baseball
- Founder: Colonel Nelson W. Russler; Fuller Barnard Jr. Charles Boyer
- First season: 1916
- Folded: August 16, 1916
- Replaced by: Blue Ridge League
- President: Fuller Barnard Jr. (1916)
- No. of teams: 4
- Country: United States of America
- Most titles: 1 Frostburg Demons (1916)

The Potomac League was a minor league baseball league that played a partial season as a Class D level league in 1916. The Potomac League featured four teams based in West Virginia and Maryland. The Potomac League permanently folded on August 16, 1916 with the Frostburg Demons in first place.

== History ==
Cumberland, Maryland resident Colonel Nelson W. Russler and Cumberland attorney Fuller Barnard Jr. laid the groundwork the Potomac League at a meeting held in February, 1916. Charles Boyer, president of the Blue Ridge League organized a group of businessmen to garner interest in fielding a league in the area. One year earlier, Cumberland had sought entry into the 1915 Blue Ridge League, but were unsuccessful due to distance. Fuller Bernard became the Potomac League president.

The Potomac League formed for the 1916 season as a Class D level minor league. The Potomac League featured four charter teams. The Cumberland, Maryland based Cumberland Colts, the Frostburg, Maryland based Frostburg Demons, the Lonaconing, Maryland] based Lonaconing Giants and the Piedmont Drybugs, based in Piedmont, West Virginia, were the four league franchises.

The Potomac League began play on May 3, 1916. In the two opening day games, Frostburg and Cumberland played at Cumberland's South End Park, with Cumberland winning 2–0, and 1,500 in attendance. Piedmont and Lonaconing played at Lonaconing Park, with Piedmont winning 5–0. For the season, the league had two umpires, one for each game, Doll Derr and Thomas McNamara.

The Potomac League struggled financially, as Cumberland was the only league franchise turning a profit. On July 23, 1916, the Lonaconing Giants franchise folded. This left the Potomac League with three teams and the schedule was rearranged for the season to continue.

On August 16, 1916, the first place Frostburg Demons franchise folded due to financial reasons. This forced the Potomac League to permanently fold.

The final Potomac League standings were led by the Frostburg Demons, who folded with a record of 33–25. Frostburg was 6.0 games ahead of the second place Lonaconing Giants (26–18), followed by the Piedmont Drybugs (26–30) and Cumberland Colts (23–35).

Following the 1916 season, the Potomac League franchises of Cumberland and Piedmont continued in minor league baseball. Cumberland became a member of the Class D level Blue Ridge League in 1917 and played through 1932. Piedmont, also known as Piedmont/Westernport, played in the 1918 Blue Ridge League.

== Standings and statistics ==
1916 Potomac League

Team standings	W	L	PCT	GB	Managers
Frostburg Demons	33	25	.569	–	Pat Brophy
Piedmont Drybugs	26	30	.464	6	Cy Harris / Dutch Kane
Cumberland Colts	23	35	.397	10	Tom Russler
Lonaconing Giants	26	18	.691	NA	James McGuire / Roy Keener

Lonaconing disbanded July 23.
The league disbanded August 16

Player statistics
Player	Team	Stat	Tot	Player	Team	Stat	Tot
Joe Phillips	Cumberland	BA	.367	Ben Schaufele	Piedmont	W	14
Roy Keener	Lonaconing/Cumberland	Runs	51	John Baylor	Frostburg	SO	114
Roy Keener	Lonaconing/Cumberland	Hits	82	Bill Stair	Frostburg	Pct	.889; 8–1
Paul Cobb	Lonaconing/Cumberland	HR	6				
