= Beaver Falls Bees =

- 1907–1941; (1907, 1931, 1937–1941); Beaver Falls, Pennsylvania

Minor league affiliations
- Previous classes: Class D (1937–1941); Class C (1931); Class C (1907)
- League: Pennsylvania State Association (1937–1941)
- Previous leagues: Middle Atlantic League (1931); Western Pennsylvania League (1907)

Major league affiliations
- Previous teams: St. Louis Browns (1939); Boston Bees (1937)

Team data
- Previous names: Beaver Falls Bees (1937, 1939, 1941); Beaver Falls Browns (1938, 1940); Beaver Falls Beavers (1907, 1931)

The Beaver Falls Bees was the predominant name of a minor league baseball team located in Beaver Falls, Pennsylvania between 1937 and 1941. The team can be traced back to 1931 as the Beaver Falls Beavers who first played in the Middle Atlantic League. An earlier traceable Beavers team played in the Western Pennsylvania League in 1907. In 1937, Bees were an affiliate of the Boston Bees in the Pennsylvania State Association. The team then changed its name each year between the Bees and the Beaver Falls Browns.

== Notable alumni ==
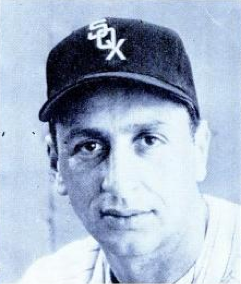
Saul Rogovin

- George Barnicle
- Bob Barr
- Bill Burgo
- Rags Faircloth
- Nick Goulish
- Earl Jones
- Lou Lucier
- Red Nonnenkamp
- Saul Rogovin
- Chet Ross
- Jim Russell
- Bill Strickland
- Whitey Wietelmann
