= Connellsville Cokers =

American basketball team

The Connellsville Cokers were an American basketball team based in Cokesville, Pennsylvania, that was a member of the Coke Basketball League.

== Year-by-year ==
| Year | League | Reg. Season | Playoffs |
|---|---|---|---|
| 1910/11 | CBL | 4th | No playoff |
| 1911/12 | CBL | 3rd | No playoff |
