= Western Pennsylvania League =

- Classification: Class D (1907)
- Sport: Minor League Baseball
- First season: 1907
- Folded: 1907
- President: Alex J. Lawson (1907); Charles B. Powers (1907)
- No. of teams: 9
- Country: United States of America
- Most titles: 1 Fairmont Champions(1907)

The Western Pennsylvania League was a Class D level minor league baseball league consisting of teams based in Pennsylvania, West Virginia and Maryland that played during the 1907 season.

== History ==
The Class D level Western Pennsylvania League began the 1907 season with eight teams. The Beaver Falls Beavers, Butler White Sox, Clarksburg Bees, Connellsville Cokers, Fairmont Champions, Greensburg Red Sox, Scottdale Giants and the Latrobe, Pennsylvania team were charter members.

On May 28, 1907, the Latrobe team was forfeited to the league. The Cumberland Rooters took its place, but that team moved to Piedmont, West Virginia on June 27, then to Somerset, Pennsylvania on July 11. It eventually folded altogether later that month. On August 1, the Kittanning Infants entered the league, but disbanded, along with Beaver Falls, on August 11, 1907. Greensburg disbanded on August 25, 1907. Fairmont finished in first place with a 68–36 record. Jim Clark, Dick Hoblitzell and Reddy Mack played in the league.

A league by the same name existed in the late 1889.

== 1907 Western Pennsylvania League standings ==
Team standings	W	L	PCT	GB	Managers
Fairmont Champions	68	36	.654	–	Reddy Mack
Butler White Sox	58	44	.569	9.0	Al Lawson / Jake Jacobsen; Eddie Linneborn / Bill Harkins
Scottdale Giants	48	49	.495	16.5	Billy Earle / Duff Buttermore
Clarksburg Bees	50	54	.481	18.0	Tom Hulings; Tom Essler / Bull Smith
Greensburg Red Sox	42	50	.457	20.0	George Lawson; Bill Powell / Lefty Wallace
Connellsville Cokers	44	59	.427	23.5	Bill Malarkey; Denny O'Hara / [Jack Dolan
Beaver Falls Beavers	41	36	.532	NA	Charles Jewell / Harry Pfeiffer
Latrobe / Cumberland Rooters / Piedmont / Somerset	18	46	.281	NA	S. Whaley / William Morrow; Tom Dillon / Don Curtis / Bill Malarkey
Kittanning Infants	2	5	.286	NA	Bill Malarkey

The Latrobe (7–10) franchise was forfeited to the league May 28. The league then awarded it to Cumberland. Cumberland (5–20) moved to Piedmont (4–6) June 27, then to Somerset (0–5) July 11. It disbanded later that month.
Kittanning entered the league August 1. Beaver Falls and Kittanning withdrew August 11.
Greensburg disbanded August 25
