= Central Basketball League =

The Central Basketball League was an early regional professional or semi-pro basketball league based in Ohio and Pennsylvania. The league disbanded on November 12, 1912, after playing a few exhibition games. Joseph "Joe" Meech Leithead served as Secretary prior to 1908 and President of the League for four years 1908–1912. Previously, Leithead was coach and captain of the Pittsburgh's South Side team from 1899 to 1907.

== Complete team list ==
- Alliance (1908/09, replaced East Liverpool Potters)
- Butler (1906/07)
- Canton (1906/07, replaced Homestead Young Americans for 1906/07 postseason)
- Charleroi Cherubs (1911/12)
- Connellsville Cokers (1910/11-11/12)
- East Liverpool Potters (1906/07-08/09, replaced by Alliance in 1908/09)
- Greensburg Billikins (1906/07-09/10)
- Homestead Young Americans (1906/07-10/11, as Homestead Steeltowners in 1910/11; replaced by Canton for 1906/07 postseason)
- Johnstown Johnnies (1908/09-11/12)
- McKeesport Tubers (1906/07-10/11)
- Pittsburgh South Side (1900/01-11/12)
- Uniontown Berets (1908/09-11/12)
- Washington Georges (1908/09, dropped out during season)

== Champions ==
- 1906/07 East Liverpool Potters & Pittsburgh South Side
- 1907/08 East Liverpool Potters
- 1908/09 Homestead Young Americans
- 1909/10 McKeesport Tubers
- 1910/11 McKeesport Tubers
- 1911/12 Johnstown Johnnies
- 1912/13 LEAGUE DISBANDED
