= Saginaw Ducks =

- 1913–1915; (1906, 1908–1915); Saginaw, Michigan

Minor league affiliations
- Class: Class C 1906, 1914–1915); Class D (1906–1910, 1912–1913); Class B (1919–1926)
- League: Interstate Association (1906); Southern Michigan League (1906, 1908–1915)

Major league affiliations
- Team: None

Minor league titles
- League titles (3): 1911; 1912; 1914
- Conference titles (1): 1914

Team data
- Name: Saginaw (1906); Saginaw Wa-was (1908–1910); Saginaw Krazy Kats (1911); Saginaw Trailers (1912); Saginaw Ducks (1913–15)
- Ballpark: Aces Park (1919-1926)

The Saginaw Ducks were a minor league baseball team based in Saginaw, Michigan. Saginaw teams played as members of the Class B level Southern Michigan League in 1906 and from 1908 to 1915, winning league championships in 1908, 1909 and 1914. Saginaw manager Ducky Holmes was the namesake of the "Ducks" nickname and led the team to the 1914 title.

Baseball Hall of Fame member Jesse Haines pitched for the Saginaw Ducks in both 1914 and 1915, his first professional seasons.

Pro Football Hall of Fame member Greasy Neale played for Saginaw in 1915. Neale was a two-sport professional athlete, who won both a World Series championship and an NFL championship in his career.

In 1906, the Saginaw played in two leagues as the Interstate Association folded in July and Saginaw quickly joined the Southern Michigan League during the season.

The Saginaw teams hosted minor league home games at the ballpark that became known as Aces Park in Saginaw. The ballpark site was known as Athletic Park (1902–1906), Recreation Park (1908) and Burkhart Park (1909–1915) in the Duck's era of home play at the ballpark.

== History ==
=== Early teams ===
Minor league baseball was first played in Saginaw, Michigan in 1884, when the Saginaw "Greys" team played the season as members of the Northwestern League. After numerous other teams followed, the 1906 Saginaw teams were immediately preceded in minor league play by the 1900 Saginaw Salt Eaters team, who ended a two-season tenure as members of the independent International League.

=== 1906: Two leagues in one season ===
The "Saginaw" team resumed minor league play to begin the 1906 season. Saginaw began the 1906 season playing as charter members of the short lived Interstate Association. The league was formed as a Class C level league, with Emerson W. Dickinson serving as league president.

The 1906 Interstate Association was an eight–team league that began play on April 26, 1906. The league was formed with teams representing Anderson, Indiana, Bay City, Michigan, Flint, Michigan (Flint Vehicles), Fort Wayne, Indiana (Fort Wayne Railroaders), Kalamazoo, Michigan (Kalamazoo White Sox), Lima, Ohio (Lima Lees), Marion, Indiana (Marion Moguls), Muncie, Indiana (Muncie Fruit Jars) and Saginaw, Michigan teams beginning play on April 26, 1906. During the season, the Muncie and Bay city teams were both disbanded on May 18. The Saginaw team moved to Marion, Ohio on June 21 before folding after three games in Marion. The Flint team disbanded on July 2, 1906. The Interstate Association, with four remaining teams, permanently disbanded on July 8, 1906.

Saginaw manager "Bootie" Wolf was a Saginaw native, who eventually became Judge Willam J. Wolf. After playing baseball at the University of Michigan, where he also received his Law Degree in 1899, Wolf played organized baseball in the region from 1893 to 1906. Wolf then owned a billiards hall and other business ventures, while also serving the public on numerous boards and organizations in Saginaw. In 1930, Wolf was appointed as a municipal judge to fill out a remaining term. Wolf was elected the next year and was the reelected in every subsequent election, winning his last election term when he was nearly 80 years of age.

The Fort Wayne Railroaders were in first place when the Interstate Association folded on July 8, 1906, and the Saginaw team had folded. Saginaw had moved to Marion for three games before folding on June 24, 1906. The team finished with a record of 18–33, playing under managers Louie Heilbroner and Bootie Wolf and A.B. Kimberly. Fort Wayne was followed by the Marion (36–24), Anderson (30–31) and Lima (26–36) teams in the final league standings of the remaining teams. The Interstate Association did not reform as a minor league after folding during the 1906 season.

After the Interstate League franchise folded during the 1906 season, Saginaw immediately joined a new league and began an eight-season tenure of membership in the Southern Michigan League. The six–team Class D level Southern Michigan League, also called the "Southern Michigan Association" was formed for the beginning of the 1906 season. Joining the league during the season Saginaw joined the existing Battle Creek Crickets, Jackson Convicts, Mount Clemens Bathers, Saginaw and Tecumseh Indians teams as charter members.

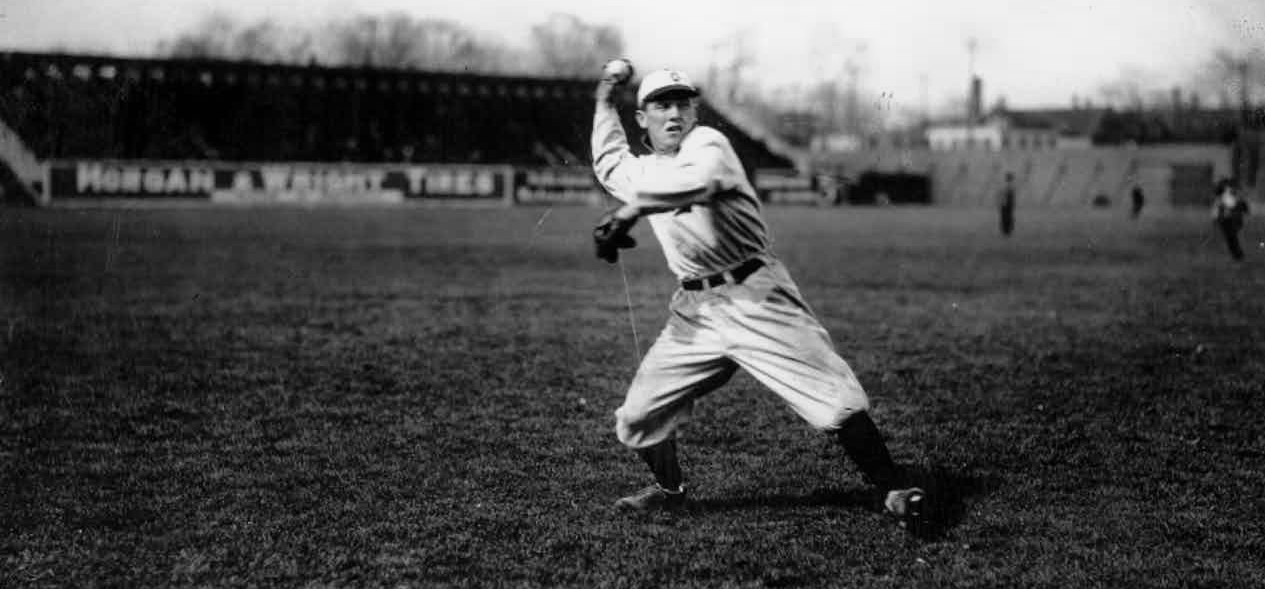
(1908) Donie Bush, Detroit Tigers. At age 18, Bush played for Saginaw in 1906. Bush was a long-time major league player and manager.

Clarance Jessup was named manager of the newly formed Saginaw team. Jessup had managed the Marion Moguls team in the folded Interstate Association. Jessup brought his best Marion player with him to Saginaw, 18-year-old shortstop Donie Bush. A noted strong defensive short stop Bush would go on to a lengthy major league playing career with the Detroit Tigers and Washington Senators. Bush then became a major league manager with the Washington Senators, Pittsburgh Pirates Chicago White Sox and Cincinnati Reds. Bush also managed in the minor leagues, where he managed a young Ted Williams in 1939 with the Minneapolis Millers. Playing under Bush at Minneapolis, Williams won the Triple Crown in the American Association, hitting .366, with 43 home runs, and 142 RBI. He’d also hit 30 doubles, 9 triples and drew 114 walks.

The "Saginaw" team began Southern Michigan League play on July 18, 1906. Because the league was already in play, the new Saginaw team was given a record of 15-20 in the team standings when the team was added to the league.

In their first season in the newly formed league playing with their inherited record, the Saginaw placed last in the 1906 Southern Michigan League. Managed by Clarence Jessup, the Saginaw team finished the season 30 .5 games behind the first place Mount Clemens Bathers, who were the league champions with a 63–41 final record. No league playoffs were held.

=== 1908 to 1909: Two Southern Michigan State League championships ===
In 1907, the Saginaw team did not continue play in the Southern Michigan League. Without Saginaw, the Southern Michigan League became a Class B level league after it expanded to become an eight-team league, folding the Saginaw team and adding the Bay City, Lansing Senators and Flint Vehicles teams to the league.

In 1908, Saginaw rejoined the Southern Michigan League, as the Saginaw "Wa-was" replaced the Bay City team in the league. Saginaw became the 1908 Southern Michigan League champions in returning to league play. The "Wa-was" ended the season with a record of 72–52 and in first place, as the league held no playoffs. Led by managers Bruce Hayes and Frank Dillon, Saginaw ended the season 3.0 games ahead of the second place Kalamazoo White Sox in the final standings of the eight-team league.

The Saginaw "Wa-was" repeated as champions in 1909, continuing play in the eight-team Southern Michigan League, which held no playoffs. In winning the championship, Saginaw ended the season with a final record of 73–52 to place first, playing their championship season under manager Billy Smith. In a tight race for the title, the Wa-was ended the season just 0.5 game ahead of the second place Flint Vehicles and 1.0 game ahead of the third place Jackson Convicts in the final standings. Pitcher Ed Kusel of Saginaw led the league with a 22–7 record.

=== 1910 to 1915: A third Southern Michigan State League title ===
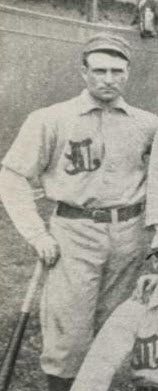
(1898) Malachi Kittridge. Nicknamed in his honor, Kittridge managed the Saginaw "Krazy Kats" in 1911.

After two consecutive championships, the 1910 Saginaw Wa-was finished in last place in the Southern Michigan League standings. The Wa-was ended the season in eighth-place in the eight-team Southern Michigan League final standings. Playing under managers Billy Smith and Frank Wessell, Saginaw finished with a final record of 46-93, finishing 41.0 games ahead of the first place Kalamazoo Kazoos and Lansing Senators, who finished in a tie with identical records of 87-52. Due to their tie in the standings, a playoff series was held, and Kalamazoo beat Lansing 4 games to 2 in the finals to claim the league championship.

Mal Kittridge became the Saginaw manager for the 1911 season. The season before he was the player-manager of the 1910 Elgin Kittens of the Class D level Northern Association, leading the team to the league championship. The Elgin "Kittens" were nicknamed after their manager. Relatedly, the Saginaw team became known as the "Krazy Kats" in the season under his leadership. A former major league catcher, Kittridge last played in the majors with the 1906 Cleveland Naps, after a tenure with the Chicago Colts began in 1890.

In 1911, the Southern Michigan League was upgraded from a Class D level league to a Class C level league, as the Saginaw "Krazy Kats" continued league play. With a record of 88–51, playing under manager Mal Kittridge, the Krazy Kats finished 16.0 games behind the first place Kalamazoo Celery Pickers in the final standings. With their first-place finish and no playoffs in the eight-team league, Kalamazoo won their second consecutive Michigan State League championship. Saginaw's Buck Hopkins led Michigan State League with 120 runs scored and teammate Joe Kutina had 193 total hits, most in the league.

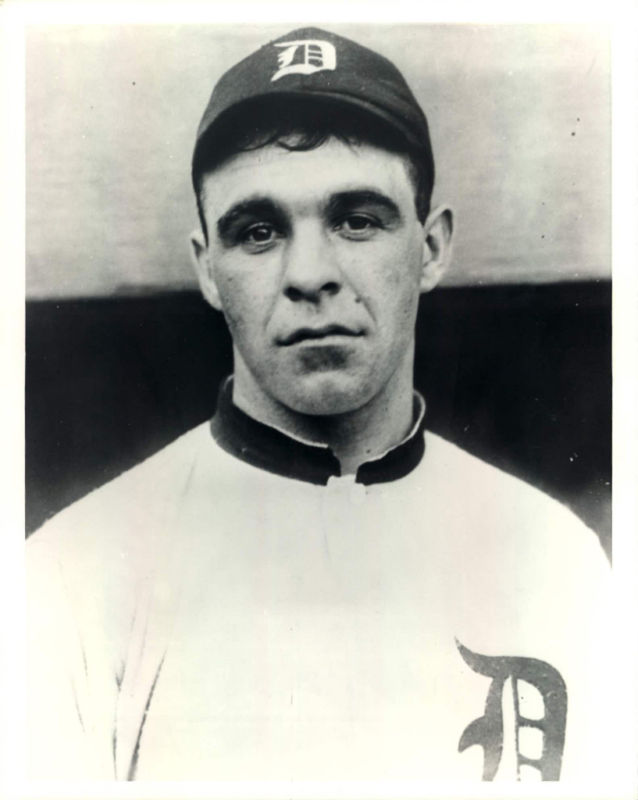
(1917) Archie Yelle, Detroit Tigers. A Saginaw native, Yelle played for Saginaw in 1911 and 1912 after his graduation from Saginaw High School.

Saginaw native Archie Yelle played for his hometown team in 1911 and 1912, in his first professional seasons after a becoming three-sport athlete at Saginaw High School. Aside from playing three seasons in the major leagues with the Detroit Tigers, Yelle, played 17 seasons in the minor leagues, where he appeared in 1,449 games, 1,305 playing as a catcher.

The Saginaw "Trailers" disbanded during the 1912 Southern Michigan League season due to flooding in Saginaw. The flooding of the Saginaw River destroyed their ballpark site, which was just north of the river. On July 13, 1912, both the Saginaw and Bay City teams folded from the eight-team league, leaving six remaining teams to finish the season. The Trailers folded with a record of 19–44, playing their partial season under manager James Walter Hartwell. Bay City had a 19–43 record. The Adrian Lions were the eventual league champions of the six remaining teams.

Despite folding in 1912, both the Saginaw and Bay City teams returned to the Southern Michigan League in 1913. The 1913 Bay City Beavers continued play in the league, as did Saginaw and the league played with eight-teams in 1913.

In 1913, Ducky Holmes became the Saginaw player/manager and the Saginaw team became known as the "Ducks." With Holmes playing catcher while managing the Saginaw, the Ducks ended the Southern Michigan League season in fourth place in the final standings, as the league became a Class D level league. The Ducks ended the season in the middle of the eight-team Southern Michigan League, with a 60–65 record. Saginaw finished 18.0 games behind first-place Battle Creek Crickets in the eight-team league. Saginaw pitcher Hal Schwenk had 283 strikeouts to lead the Southern Michigan League.

The 1914 Saginaw Ducks won the third franchise championship in the Southern Michigan League. The league again became classified as a Class C level league as it expanded from an eight-team league to a ten-team league. The league expanded and Saginaw finished the regular season in second place. The Ducks had an overall record of 90–55 record, as the team placed second in the ten-team league, which played a split season schedule. The Ducks were managed by the returning Ducky Holmes, with the team finishing 5.5 games behind first-place Bay City Beavers. Bay City won the first half pennant and Saginaw won the second half pennant and both qualified to meet in the playoff final. The playoff was won by the Saginaw Ducks 4 games to 1 over Bay City.

Saginaw pitcher Russell Robins had 338 strikeouts to lead the Southern Michigan League in 1914, while teammate Walter Scott a league leading won 27 games. The next pitcher behind Robins in league strikeouts had 225 strikeouts, more than 100 less than Robins. At age 22, Robins pitched 306 innings in compiling his 338 strikeouts. Pitching his second season with Saginaw, Walter Scott threw 318 innings for his 27 wins in what was his final professional season on record.

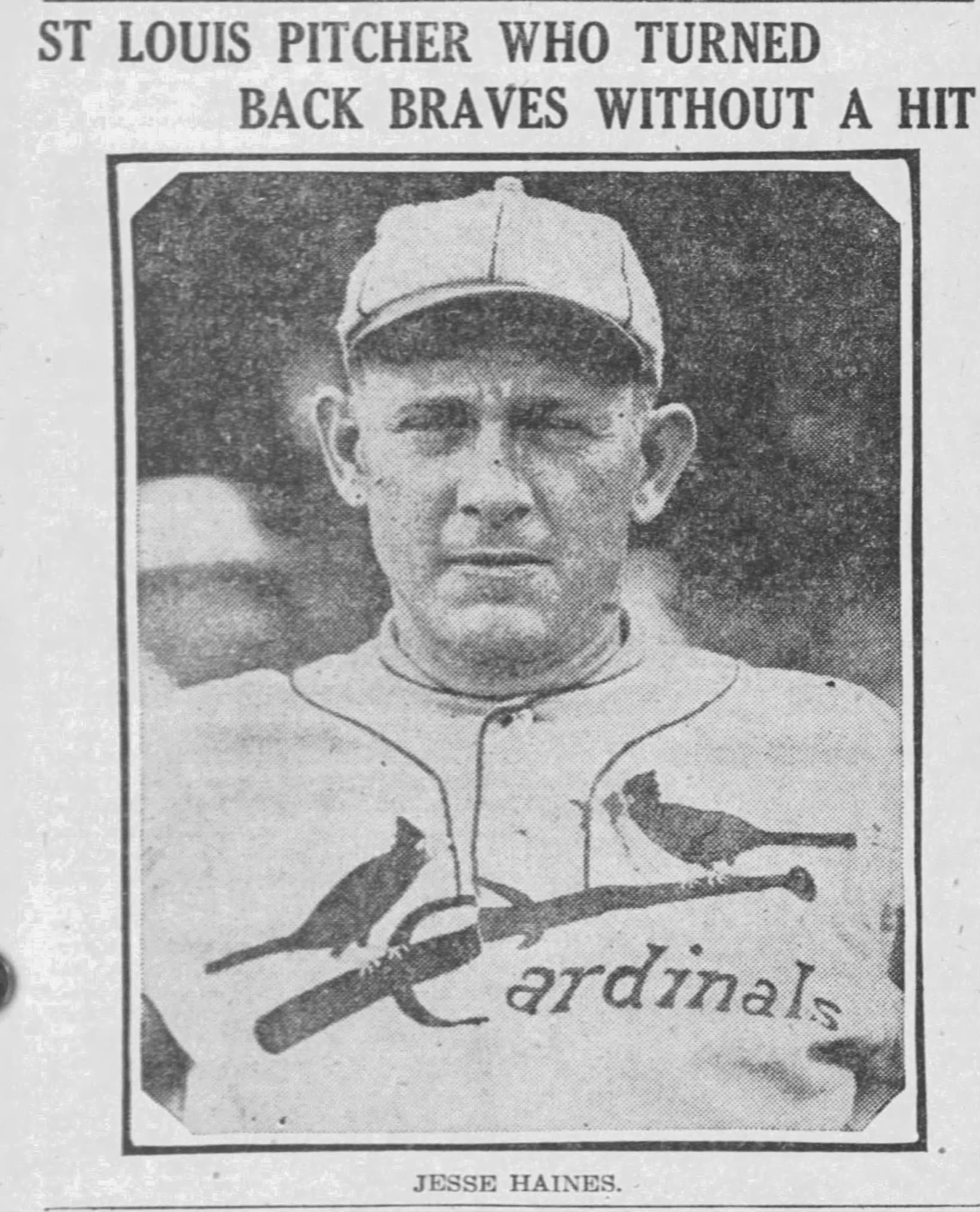
(1924) St. Louis Cardinals pitcher Jesse Haines. A member of the Baseball Hall of Fame, Haines pitched for Saginaw in his first two professional seasons. Haines led the Ducks to the 1914 championship, pitching a complete came in their clinching win in the playoff series.

At age 20, Baseball Hall of Fame member Jesse Haines first pitched for Saginaw win 1914, his first professional season. Haines began the season with Fort Wayne Railroaders after signing for a salary of $135 per month. Haines pitched just twice for Fort Wayne before breaking his finger in batting practice. Haines then joined Saginaw Ducks in where he won 17 games, pitching 258 innings, earning 115 per month. Haines led the Ducks to the league title by pitching a ten-inning complete game in the final of the championship series. "In the minor leagues you were lucky to get paid at all," said Haines, "But I wanted to play so badly that the salary meant but little to me."

Haines returned to Saginaw in 1915 and threw no-hitter against the Flint Vehicles on June 9, 1915. Haines was signed by the Detroit Tigers on June 29, 1915, from Saginaw, beginning his major league career.

Al Bashang played for the Saginaw Ducks for three seasons, from 1913 to 1915. He later would return as a player and manager of the Saginaw Aces for an additional three seasons, from 1923 to 1925.

In 1915, the Saginaw Ducks continued league play in the final season of Southern Michigan League, which reduced to six teams, while retaining Class C level status, The league did not complete the season and permanently folded on July 7, 1915. Managed by Ducky Holmes, Saginaw had compiled a record of 31-38 when the league folded, finishing 13.5 behind the first place South Bend Factors. At the time the league folded, Saginaw pitcher Ben Higley had a league-leading 127 strikeouts.

At age 23. outfielder Greasy Neale played for Saginaw in 1915 before advancing to the major leagues in 1916. A two-sport athlete, Neale also played college and professional football before becoming a collegiate and professional football coach. Following his baseball season in 1915, Neale began his football coaching career that fall as the head coach at Muskingum University. Neale also played Major League Baseball with the Cincinnati Reds from 1916 and 1924. Neale was the starting right fielder for the World Series winning 1919 Reds, Neale hit .357 in the 1919 World Series and led the Reds with 10 total hits in their eight-game series win over the Black Sox Scandal tainted Chicago White Sox. When football seasons began, Neale would usually leave baseball to fulfill his football duties, with the exception of 1919 when he played the entire season. Neale coached the Philadelphia Eagles to NFL championships in 1948 and 1949. He was inducted into the Pro Football Hall of Fame in 1969.

The onset of World War I had greatly affected minor leagues as many leagues and teams were folded. The Southern Michigan League never reformed .

Saginaw was without baseball until the 1919 Saginaw Aces resumed minor league play as charter members of the eight-team, Class B level Michigan-Ontario League, winning the league championship.

== The ballpark ==
The Saginaw Ducks and other Saginaw teams played minor league home games at the ballpark site known later as "Aces Park." The ballpark hosted Saginaw minor league teams from 1902 to 1926. in the Saginaw Southern Michigan League tenure, the ballpark was known as Athletic Park (1902–1906), Recreation Park (1908), and Burkhart Park (1909–1915) It then was known as Opportunity Park (1919).

The ballpark faced criticism when hosting professional baseball in 1906, with the playing field in Saginaw being noted as problematic in newspaper accounts. The Superior (WI) Times said, "“They have the most wonderful ballpark in the country at Saginaw, Mich. Originally the field was a lumber yard and it is not much better today, the sod having been worn away in spots, allowing sawdust to percolate through." There were also reports of wood boards still being present just underneath of the playing surface.

In the era, Aces Park was located at Davenport Avenue and Mary Street in Saginaw, Michigan. The park had some misfortune. It was destroyed by fire in 1908 and rebuilt. The ballpark flooded in 1912 and was destroyed by fire again in 1913, to be rebuilt again. Today, the site is a salvage yard.

== Timeline ==
Year(s)	# Yrs.	Team	Level	League	Ballpark
1906 (1)	1	Saginaw	Class C	Interstate League	Aces Park
1906 (2)	1	Saginaw	Class D	Southern Michigan League	Aces Park
1908–1910	3	Saginaw Wa-was	Class D	Southern Michigan League	Aces Park
1911	1	Saginaw Krazy Kats	Class C	Southern Michigan League	Aces Park
1912	1	Saginaw Trailers	Class D	Southern Michigan League	Aces Park
1913	1	Saginaw Ducks	Class D	Southern Michigan League	Aces Park
1914–1915	2	Saginaw Ducks	Class C	Southern Michigan League	Aces Park

== Year-by-year records ==
Year	Record	Finish	Manager	Playoffs/notes
1906 (1)	18–33	NA	Bootie Wolf / A.B. Kimberly	Saginaw moved to Marion for final 3 games Team folded June 24; League folded August 8
1906 (2)	34–60	6th	Clarence Jessup	Saginaw joined league play July 18; Began play with a 15-20 record No playoffs held
1908	72–52	1st	Bruce Hayes / Frank Dillon	League champions No playoffs held
1909	73–52	1st	Billy Smith	League champions No playoffs held
1910	46–93	8th	Billy Smith / Frank Wessell	Did not qualify for playoff
1911	72–67	5th	Mal Kittridge	No playoffs held
1912	19–44	NA	Walter Hartwell	No playoffs held
1913	60–65	4th	Ducky Holmes	No playoffs held
1914	90–55	2nd	Ducky Holmes	10-team league Won 2nd half pennant League champions
1915	31–38	5th	Ducky Holmes	League folded July 7

== Notable alumni ==
- Jesse Haines (1914-1915) Baseball Hall of Fame, Inducted 1970
- Greasy Neale (1915) Pro Football Hall of Fame, Inducted, 1969
- Jack Barnett (1911)
- Al Bashang (1913-1915)
- Donie Bush (1906)
- Al Clauss (1912)
- Cliff Daringer (1908–1909)
- Frank Dillon (1908, MGR)
- Hack Eibel (1913)
- Frank Gilhooley (1910)
- Ducky Holmes (1913-1915, MGR)
- Buck Hopkins (1911)
- Ray Jansen (1913–1914)
- Mal Kittridge (1911, MGR)
- Pete Knisely (1910)
- Ed Kusel (1909)
- Joe Kutina (1911)
- Ray Jansen (1913)
- Fred Lamlein (1909)
- Clarence Mitchell (1911)
- Chuck Miller (1909)
- Erwin Renfer (1911)
- Lou Schiappacasse (1909)
- Hal Schwenk (1913)
- Jack Snyder (1913)
- Hughie Tate (1914)
- Ben Taylor (1910)
- Hooks Warner (1915)
- Archie Yelle (1911–1912)

== See also ==
- Saginaw Wa-was players
- Saginaw Trailers players
- Saginaw Krazy Kats players
- Saginaw Ducks players

== See also ==
Saginaw, Michigan minor league baseball history
