= Southern Michigan League =

- Classification: Class D (1906–1910); Class C (1911); Class D (1912–1913); Class C (1914–1915)
- Sport: Minor League Baseball
- First season: 1906
- Folded: 1915
- President: Joseph S. Jackson (1906–1909); James P. Bowen (1910–1912); James Frank (1913–1915)
- No. of teams: 12
- Country: United States of America
- Most titles: 2 Kalamazoo Kazoos/Celery Pickers (1908–1909); Saginaw Wa-was (1910–1911)
- Related competitions: Michigan State League

The Southern Michigan League was a Minor League Baseball circuit which operated between 1906 and 1912. It was classified as a Class D league from 1906 to 1910 and as a Class C league from 1911 to 1912. After that, the league was known as the Southern Michigan Association between 1913 and 1915.

The Southern Michigan Association held a Class D status in 1913 and was given Class C recognition in 1914 and 1915. The Association closed up after the 1915 season.

== Cities represented/teams ==
- Adrian, Michigan: Adrian Yeggs (1909–11); Adrian Lions (1912); Adrian Champs (1913); Adrian Fencevilles (1914)
- Battle Creek, Michigan: Battle Creek Crickets (1906–15)
- Bay City, Michigan: Bay City (1907, 1910); Bay City Reds (1908), Bay City Cardinals (1909), Bay City Billikens (1911–12); Bay City Beavers (1913–15)
- Flint, Michigan: Flint Vehicles (1907–15)
- Jackson, Michigan: Jackson Convicts (1906–13); Jackson Chiefs (1914); Jackson Vets (1915)
- Kalamazoo, Michigan: Kalamazoo White Sox (1906–08); Kalamazoo Kazoos (1909–10, 1913–14); Kalamazoo Celery Pickers (1911–12)
- Lansing, Michigan: Lansing Senators (1907–14)
- Mount Clemens, Michigan: Mount Clemens Bathers (1906–07, 1914)
- Saginaw, Michigan: Saginaw (1906); Saginaw Wa-was (1908–10); Saginaw Krazy Kats (1911); Saginaw Trailers (1912); Saginaw Ducks (1913–15)
- South Bend, Indiana: South Bend Benders (1914); South Bend Factors (1915)
- Tecumseh, Michigan: Tecumseh Indians (1906–08)
- Toledo, Ohio: Toledo Mud Hens (1914)

== League champions ==
- 1906 – Mount Clemens Bathers
- 1907 – Tecumseh
- 1908 – Saginaw Wa-was
- 1909 – Saginaw Wa-was
- 1910 – Kalamazoo Kazoos
- 1911 – Kalamazoo Celery Pickers
- 1912 – Adrian Lions
- 1913 – Battle Creek Crickets
- 1914 – Saginaw Ducks
- 1915 – South Bend Factors

== Standings & statistics ==
=== 1906 to 1910 ===
1906 Southern Michigan League

| Team standings | W | L | PCT | GB | Managers |
|---|---|---|---|---|---|
| Mount Clemens Bathers | 69 | 34 | .670 | - | Walter Trombley |
| Kalamazoo White Sox | 63 | 41 | .612 | 6½ | Clarence Pickell / Maurice Myers |
| Tecumseh Indians | 57 | 47 | .548 | 12½ | Horace Brewer |
| Jackson Convicts | 52 | 52 | .500 | 17½ | Maurice Myers / Rube Deneau |
| Battle Creek Crickets | 39 | 56 | .411 | 26 | George Black/ Maurice Myers / Joe Ganzel |
| Saginaw | 34 | 60 | .362 | 30½ | Clarence Jessup |

Saginaw began play July 18 and awarded a record of 15-20. The Battle Creek record of 4-38 was expunged on July 21 and the reorganized team was awarded a record of 15-20 on July 22. The official standings were unequal due to the adjusted won-lost records.

Player statistics
| Player | Team | Stat | Tot |
|---|---|---|---|
| Bill Roth | Mt. Clemens | BA | .302 |
| Bill Roth | Mt. Clemens | Hits | 115 |

1907 Southern Michigan League

| Team standings | W | L | PCT | GB | Managers |
|---|---|---|---|---|---|
| Tecumseh Indians | 69 | 42 | .622 | - | Bo Slear |
| Kalamazoo White Sox | 62 | 47 | .569 | 6 | Maurice Myers |
| Battle Creek Crickets | 63 | 49 | .563 | 6½ | James Henderson |
| Mount Clemens Bathers | 51 | 51 | .500 | 13½ | Joe Ganzel / George Thomas |
| Bay City | 46 | 57 | .447 | 19 | M.E. Taylor |
| Lansing Senators | 46 | 57 | .447 | 19 | Jack Morrissey |
| Flint Vehicles | 42 | 64 | .396 | 24½ | Fred Mason / Pete Tibald |
| Jackson Convicts | 18 | 30 | .375 | NA | Bruce Haynes |

Jackson folded July 15.

Player statistics
| Player | Team | Stat | Tot | Player | Team | Stat | Tot |
|---|---|---|---|---|---|---|---|
| John Landry | Mt. Clemens | BA | .297 | Harvey Teal | Tecumseh | W | 21 |
| John Landry | Mt. Clemens | Runs | 60 | Tom Railing | Tecumseh | W | 21 |
| John Landry | Mt. Clemens | Hits | 120 | Irwin Gough | Mt. Clemens | SO | 253 |
| John Cocash | Flint | HR | 6 | Harry Steiger | Battle Creek | Pct | .810; 17-4 |
| Fred Merkle | Tecumseh | HR | 6 | | | | |

1908 Southern Michigan League - schedule

| Team standings | W | L | PCT | GB | Managers |
|---|---|---|---|---|---|
| Saginaw Wa-was | 72 | 52 | .581 | - | Bruce Hayes / Frank Dillon |
| Kalamazoo White Sox | 70 | 56 | .556 | 3 | Mo Myers |
| Jackson Convicts | 68 | 57 | .544 | 4½ | Bo Slear |
| Tecumseh Indians | 64 | 62 | .508 | 9 | Smith |
| Battle Creek Crickets | 62 | 63 | .496 | 10½ | NA |
| Lansing Senators | 60 | 65 | .480 | 12½ | Jack Morrissey |
| Flint Vehicles | 57 | 68 | .448 | 15½ | Rube Deneau / Charles Cassell |
| Bay City Reds | 48 | 78 | .381 | 25 | M. Taylor / Clyde McNutt |

Player statistics
| Player | Team | Stat | Tot | Player | Team | Stat | Tot |
|---|---|---|---|---|---|---|---|
| Leonard Cote | Kalamazoo | BA | .327 | Belmont Method | Kalamazoo | W | 24 |
| Bob Parker | Jackson | Runs | 79 | George Pearce | Lansing | SO | 298 |
| Chick Evans | Jackson | Hits | 141 | Edwin Taylor | Kalamazoo | Pct | .800; 12-3 |
| Jack Morrissey | Lansing | Hits | 141 | | | | |
| Red Bowser | Flint | HR | 11 | | | | |

1909 Southern Michigan League

| Team standings | W | L | PCT | GB | Managers |
|---|---|---|---|---|---|
| Saginaw Wa-was | 73 | 52 | .584 | - | Billy Smith |
| Flint Vehicles | 72 | 52 | .581 | ½ | Red Wright |
| Jackson Convicts | 71 | 52 | .577 | 1 | Bo Slear |
| Kalamazoo Kazoos | 64 | 60 | .516 | 8½ | Harry Martin |
| Bay City Cardinals | 59 | 66 | .478 | 14 | Ed Herr / Fritz Buelow |
| Lansing Senators | 55 | 69 | .443 | 17½ | Jack Morrissey |
| Adrian Yeggs | 52 | 73 | .416 | 21 | Charles Cassell |
| Battle Creek Crickets | 52 | 74 | .413 | 21½ | Rube Deneau |

Player statistics
| Player | Team | Stat | Tot | Player | Team | Stat | Tot |
|---|---|---|---|---|---|---|---|
| Harry Martin | Kalamazoo | BA | .330 | Gene Krapp | Flint | W | 23 |
| Harry Ball | Adrian | Runs | 94 | Elmer Criger | Jackson | Pct | .759; 22-7 |
| Harry Ball | Adrian | Hits | 141 | Ed Kusel | Saginaw | Pct | .759; 22-7 |

1910 Southern Michigan League - schedule

| Team standings | W | L | PCT | GB | Managers |
|---|---|---|---|---|---|
| Kalamazoo Kazoos | 87 | 52 | .626 | - | Butts Wagner |
| Lansing Senators | 87 | 52 | .626 | - | Jack Morrissey |
| Adrian Yeggs | 83 | 56 | .597 | 4 | Carl Vandagrift |
| Battle Creek Crickets | 72 | 64 | .529 | 13½ | Billy Earle |
| Flint Vehicles | 69 | 71 | .493 | 18½ | Ed Herr |
| Bay City | 59 | 81 | .421 | 28½ | Elbert Nugent / Leon Foy |
| Jackson Convicts | 51 | 85 | .375 | 34½ | Bo Slear |
| Saginaw Wa-was | 46 | 93 | .331 | 41 | Billy Smith / Frank Wessell |

Playoff: Kalamazoo 4 games, Lansing 2.

Player statistics
| Player | Team | Stat | Tot | Player | Team | Stat | Tot |
|---|---|---|---|---|---|---|---|
| Red Bowser | Flint | BA | .342 | Bradley Valliere | Kalamazoo | W | 23 |
| Harry Ball | Adrian | Runs | 117 | Ed Warner | Lansing | W | 23 |
| Vic Saier | Lansing | Hits | 175 | Berne Hughey | Kalamazoo | SO | 193 |
| Red Bowser | Flint | HR | 14 | Bradley Valliere | Kalamazoo | Pct | .793; 23-6 |

=== 1911 to 1912 ===
1911 Southern Michigan Association - schedule

| Team standings | W | L | PCT | GB | Managers |
|---|---|---|---|---|---|
| Kalamazoo Celery Pickers | 88 | 51 | .633 | - | Butts Wagner |
| Lansing Senators | 79 | 55 | .590 | 6½ | Jack Morrissey |
| Flint Vehicles | 77 | 59 | .566 | 9½ | Dan Collins |
| Bay City Billikens | 73 | 64 | .533 | 14 | Mo Myers / Bo Slear |
| Saginaw Krazy Kats | 72 | 67 | .518 | 16 | Mal Kittridge |
| Adrian Yeggs | 65 | 76 | .461 | 24 | Billy Smith |
| Battle Creek Crickets | 57 | 80 | .416 | 30 | John Burke |
| Jackson Convicts | 39 | 98 | .285 | 48 | Charles Fox |

Player statistics
| Player | Team | Stat | Tot | Player | Team | Stat | Tot |
|---|---|---|---|---|---|---|---|
| John Connors | Jackson | BA | .377 | Beany Jacobson | Kalamazoo | W | 26 |
| Buck Hopkins | Saginaw | Runs | 120 | Ed Warner | Lansing | W | 26 |
| Joe Kutina | Saginaw | Hits | 193 | Ed Warner | Lansing | SO | 231 |
| Clarence Kraft | Flint | HR | 19 | Beany Jacobson | Kalamazoo | Pct | .743; 26-9 |
| Pete Compton | Battle Creek | 3B | 25 | | | | |

1912 Southern Michigan League - schedule

| Team standings | W | L | PCT | GB | Managers |
|---|---|---|---|---|---|
| Adrian Lions | 78 | 47 | .624 | - | Dan Jenkins |
| Jackson Convicts | 71 | 55 | .563 | 7½ | Maurice Myers |
| Flint Vehicles | 69 | 56 | .552 | 9 | John Burke / Dan Collins |
| Lansing Senators | 63 | 62 | .504 | 15 | Jack Morrissey |
| Kalamazoo Celery Eaters | 60 | 63 | .488 | 17 | Charlie Wagner |
| Battle Creek Crickets | 59 | 68 | .465 | 20 | Eddie McKernan |
| Bay City Billikens | 19 | 43 | .306 | NA | James Slevins |
| Saginaw Trailers | 19 | 44 | .302 | NA | Walter Hartwell |

Bay City and Saginaw disbanded July 13.

Player statistics
| Player | Team | Stat | Tot | Player | Team | Stat | Tot |
|---|---|---|---|---|---|---|---|
| Jack Onslow | Lansing | BA | .385 | Robert Troy | Adrian | W | 25 |
| Fred Ochs | Flint | Runs | 89 | Robert Troy | Adrian | SO | 268 |
| John Connors | Jackson | Hits | 156 | Walt Scott | Adrian | Pct | .826; 19-4 |
| Albert "Bull" Durham | Bay City/Lansing | HR | 25 | | | | |

=== 1913 to 1915 ===
1913 Southern Michigan Association

| Team standings | W | L | PCT | GB | Managers |
|---|---|---|---|---|---|
| Battle Creek Crickets | 77 | 46 | .626 | - | Ed McKernan |
| Adrian Lions | 68 | 55 | .553 | 9 | Joe Jenkins |
| Jackson Convicts | 66 | 60 | .524 | 12½ | Maurice Myers |
| Saginaw Ducks | 60 | 65 | .480 | 18 | Ducky Holmes |
| Flint Vehicles | 57 | 64 | .471 | 19 | Dan Collins |
| Kalamazoo Kazoos | 59 | 67 | .468 | 19½ | Charles Wagner |
| Lansing Senators | 54 | 68 | .439 | 22½ | Jack Morrissey |
| Bay City Beavers | 54 | 70 | .435 | 23½ | Hugh Shannon |

Player statistics
| Player | Team | Stat | Tot | Player | Team | Stat | Tot |
|---|---|---|---|---|---|---|---|
| Fred Bramble | Kalamazoo | BA | .349 | Dick Niehaus | Battle Creek | W | 24 |
| Joe Jenkins | Adrian | Runs | 88 | Hal Schwenk | Saginaw | SO | 283 |
| T.H. McNellis | Lansing | Hits | 146 | Dick Niehaus | Battle Creek | Pct | .727; 24-9 |
| Cecil Coombs | Adrian | HR | 10 | | | | |

1914 Southern Michigan Association - schedule

| Team standings | W | L | PCT | GB | Managers |
|---|---|---|---|---|---|
| Bay City Beavers | 96 | 50 | .658 | - | Dan Jenkins |
| Saginaw Ducks | 90 | 55 | .621 | 5½ | Ducky Holmes |
| Battle Creek Crickets | 92 | 57 | .617 | 5½ | Dan Collins |
| South Bend Benders | 85 | 60 | .586 | 10½ | Ed Smith / Harry Arndt / Ben Koehler |
| Flint Vehicles | 75 | 70 | .517 | 20½ | Jack Burke |
| Jackson Chiefs | 71 | 72 | .497 | 23½ | Maurice Myers / D. Brown |
| Lansing Senators / Mt. Clemens Bathers | 63 | 80 | .441 | 31½ | Jack Morrissey |
| Toledo Mud Hens | 53 | 93 | .363 | 43 | Topsy Hartsel |
| Adrian Fencevilles | 53 | 94 | .361 | 43½ | Bill Cristall / William Henderson |
| Kalamazoo Kazoos | 49 | 97 | .336 | 47 | Charlie Wenger |

Lansing (33-35) moved to Mt. Clemens July 10.
Playoff: Saginaw 4 games, Bay City 1.

Player statistics
| Player | Team | Stat | Tot | Player | Team | Stat | Tot |
|---|---|---|---|---|---|---|---|
| Joe Harris | Bay City | BA | .386 | Walter Scott | Saginaw | W | 26 |
| Dan Jenkins | Bay City | Runs | 140 | Russell Robins | Saginaw | SO | 338 |
| Joe Harris | Bay City | Hits | 197 | John Jenkins | Bay City | Pct | .852; 23-4 |
| Edward Hoffman | Flint | HR | 12 | | | | |

1915 Southern Michigan Association - schedule

| Team standings | W | L | PCT | GB | Managers |
|---|---|---|---|---|---|
| South Bend Factors | 44 | 24 | .667 | - | Ed Smith |
| Battle Creek Crickets | 34 | 33 | .507 | 9½ | Charles Wagner |
| Jackson Vets | 31 | 33 | .484 | 11 | Dan Collins |
| Bay City Beavers | 31 | 35 | .470 | 12 | Joe Jenkins |
| Saginaw Ducks | 31 | 38 | .449 | 13½ | Ducky Holmes |
| Flint Vehicles | 31 | 39 | .443 | 14 | Ed Wheeler |

League disbanded July 7.

Player statistics
| Player | Team | Stat | Tot | Player | Team | Stat | Tot |
|---|---|---|---|---|---|---|---|
| Charles Donnelly | Bay City | BA | .387 | Charles Vallandingham | South Bend | W | 13 |
| Joe Helmer | South Bend | Runs | 48 | Ben Higley | Saginaw | SO | 127 |
| Charles Donnelly | Bay City | Hits | 87 | Charles Vallandingham | South Bend | Pct | .813; 13-3 |
| Edward Hoffman | Flint | HR | 7 | | | | |

=== References ===
- Encyclopedia of Minor League Baseball, second edition, April 1997.
