= Bay City Billikens =

- 1911–1912; (1907–1912); Bay City, Michigan

Minor league affiliations
- Class: Class D (1906–1910); Class C (1911-1912)
- League: Southern Michigan League (1907–1912)

Major league affiliations
- Team: None

Minor league titles
- League titles (0): None
- Wild card berths (0): None

Team data
- Name: Bay City (1907); Bay City Reds (1908); Bay City Cardinals (1909); Bay City (1910); Bay City Billikens (1911–1912)
- Ballpark: Clarkson Park (1907–1912)

The Bay City Billikens were a minor league baseball team based in Bay City, Michigan. From 1907 to 1915, Bay City teams played exclusively as members of the Southern Michigan League under numerous nicknames.

The Bay City Southern Michigan League baseball teams played single seasons known as the "Reds" and "Cardinals" before 1911, when they became known as the "Billikens." In 1913, the Bay City Beavers continued Southern Michigan League play, being following the Billikens.

The Bay City teams all hosted home minor league home games at Clarkson Park. The ballpark was named for Baseball Hall of Fame member John Clarkson, who became a resident of Bay City following his baseball playing career.

Several minor league teams were known by the "Billikens" nickname in the era. In 1908, the Billiken good luck figurine was copyrighted.

== History ==
=== Early teams ===
Minor league baseball began in Bay City with the 1883 "Bay City" team that played the season as members of the Northwestern League. Several Bay City minor league teams followed in various leagues. Before joining the Southern Michigan League in 1907, the "Bay city" team played briefly in the 1906 season as members of the Class C level Interstate Association. The 1906 team played under manager Con Strothers, before folding with a 6-9 record.

The 1906 Interstate Association formed as an eight–team league. The Anderson, Indiana, Flint Vehicles, Fort Wayne Railroaders, Lima Lees, Marion Moguls, Muncie Fruit Jars and Saginaw teams joined Bay City in beginning the league schedule on April 26, 1906. On May 18, 1906, during the 1906 season, both the Muncie and Bay City teams simultaneously disbanded. The Interstate Association, with four remaining teams, permanently disbanded on July 8, 1906, with Fort Wayne in first place.

=== 1907 to 1912: Southern Michigan League ===
In 1907, despite folding the previous season, Bay City resumed minor league play, becoming members of the Class D level Southern Michigan League, also called the "Southern Michigan Association". The league was in its second season of play and expanded from a six–team league to an eight–team league, adding the Bay City team as an expansion team. The Battle Creek Crickets, Flint Vehicles, Jackson Convicts, Kalamazoo White Sox, Lansing Senators, Mount Clemens Bathers and Tecumseh Indians teams joined Bay City in beginning league play on May 14, 1907.

In their first season of Southern Michigan League play, "Bay City" ended the 1907 season with a record of 46–57 to place fifth in the final league standings. Managed by M.E. Taylor, Bay City finished 19.0 games behind the first place Tecumseh Indians in the final standings, as the league held no playoffs. On July 15, 1907, Jackson had folded from the league with a record of 17-27 and Tecumseh won the league championship after the league played the remainder of the season with seven teams.

The Bay City "Reds" team continued to play in the 1908 Southern Michigan League, finishing in last place in the eight-team league. The Reds ended the season with a record of 48–78 and in eighth place. Led by returning manager M.E. Taylor and Clyde McNutt, Bay City finished the season 25.0 games behind the first place Saginaw Wa-was, as the league held no playoffs. After a thirteen-year major league career that ended with a .302 average, 1,124 RBI, 1,227 runs scored and 324 stolen bases as a shortstop, Ed McKean played for Bay City in 1908. At age 44, McKean hit .289 in 44 games. McKean retired from playing following the season.

The renamed Bay City "Cardinals" team improved to finish in fifth place in the 1909 Southern Michigan League, which held no playoffs. The Cardinals ended the season with a final record of 59–66 in the eight-team league. Playing the season under managers Ed Herr and Fritz Buelow, Bay City ended the season 14.0 games behind the first place and returning champion Saginaw Wa-was. After an injury during the 1909 season ended his playing career, Fritz Buelow became the manager Bay City Cardinals on August 15, 1909 and managed the team for the remainder of the season.

The "Bay City" team placed sixth in the eight-team Southern Michigan League in 1910. Playing under managers Elbert Nugent and Leon Foy, Bay City finished with a final record of 59-81. Bay City ended the Southern Michigan League season 28.5 games behind the first place Lansing Senators.

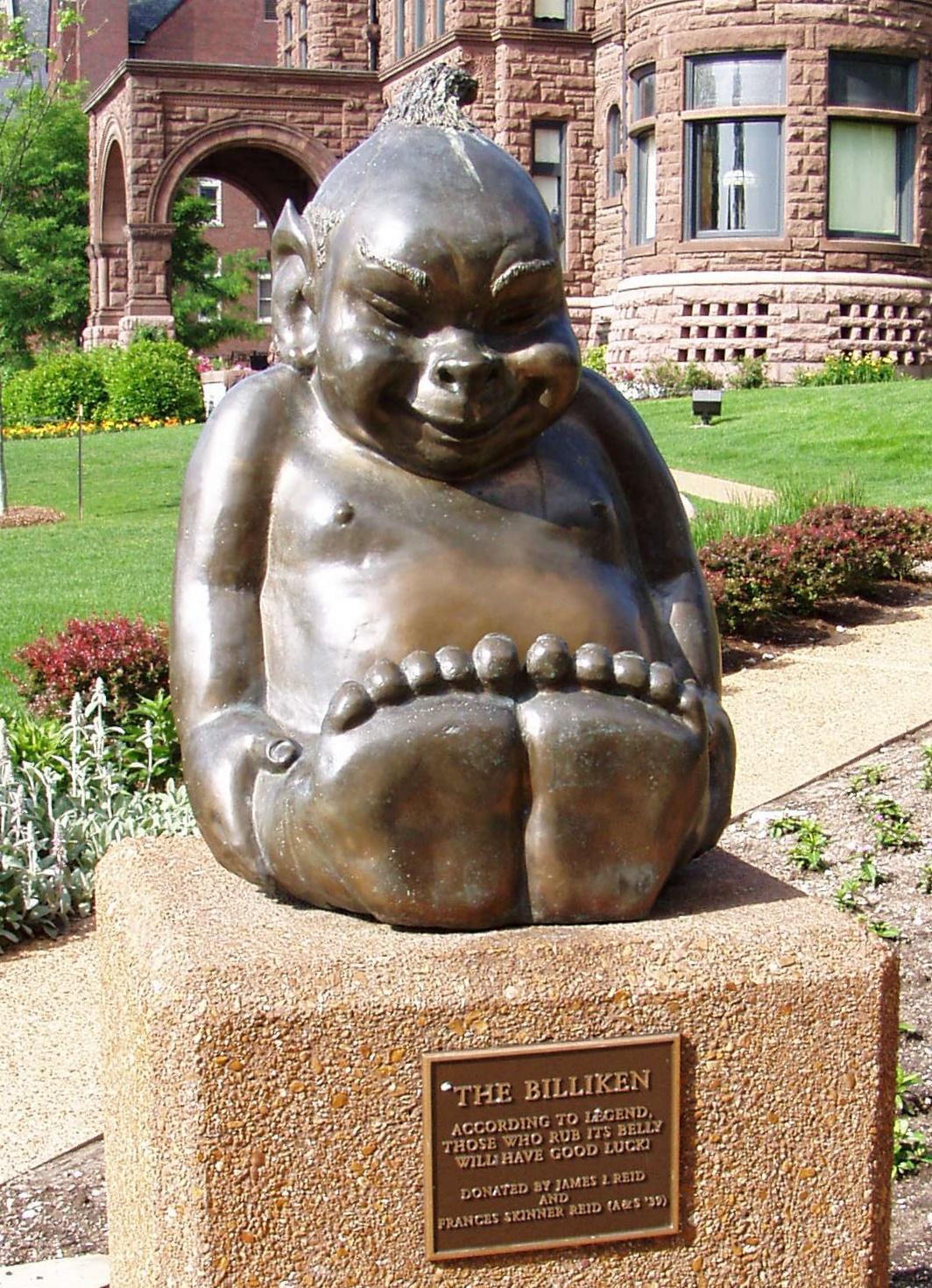
(2004) Billiken statue on the campus of St. Louis University. St. Louis, Missouri.

In 1911, the Bay City team was known by another nickname, adopting the "Billikens" moniker for the team. Created in the era, a Billiken is good luck charm doll or figurine. It is said that the possessor of the Billiken will have perpetual good luck. The Billiken figure was first patented in 1908, and mass produced after the patent. The Billiken is known as "The God of Things as They Ought to Be".

In the era, there were several minor league teams that were known by the "Billikens" moniker. These include the 1908 to 1911 Fort Wayne Billikens of the Central League, Montgomery Billikens of the 1910 Southern Association, and the McLeansboro Billikens of the 1910 Kentucky–Illinois–Tennessee League.

Today, the Saint Louis Billikens nickname is still used by the St. Louis University sports teams. The school first adopted the nickname informally in 1911 to honor their football coach, John R. Bender. During the 1911 football season, local reporters opined that Bender resembled the Billiken charm doll, which were a "national fad" at the time. His football team was referred to "Bender's Billikens." The nickname continues today.

The 1911 Bay City "Billikens" finished above .500 for the first time in Bay City's Southern Michigan League tenure of league play. The 1911 Southern Michigan League was upgraded from a Class D level league to a Class C level league, as the Bay City Billikens finished in fourth place. With a record of 73–64, playing the season under managers Mo Myers and Bo Slear, the Billikens finished 14.0 games behind the first place Kalamazoo Celery Pickers (88-51) in the final league standings.

The Billikens disbanded during the 1912 Southern Michigan League season. On July 13, 1912, both the Bay City and Saginaw teams folded from the eight-team league, leaving six remaining teams to finish the season. The Billikens folded with a record of 19–43, playing under manager James Slevins. The Adrian Lions were the eventual league champions. Albert "Bull" Durham, who spilt the season between Bay City and Lansing, led the Southern Michigan League hitters with 25 home runs. Durham's 25 home runs set a new Southern Michigan League record.

Despite folding in 1912, Bay City returned to the Southern Michigan League in 1913. The 1913 Bay City Beavers continued play in the league.

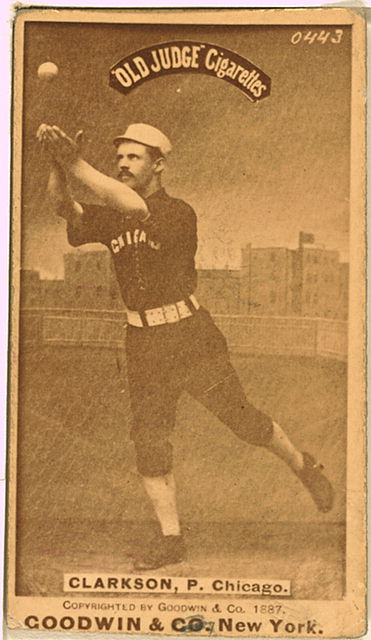
(1887) Baseball Hall of Fame member John Clarkson. Chicago White Stockings baseball card. The ballpark in Bay City was named for Clarkson.

== The ballpark ==
The Bay City teams hosted minor league home games at Clarkson Park from 1906, through the Bay City Wolves teams ending in 1926.

Clarkston Park was named for Baseball Hall of Fame member John Clarkson, who had become a resident of Bay City following his baseball career. In Bay City, Clarkson opened a tobacco shop at 103 Center Avenue, with satellite counters in Bay City's Fraser House and Phoenix Building, both within today's Bay City Downtown Historic District. While living in Bay City, Clarkson resided at 813 North Birney Street before his death in 1909. Three months after his death His widow, brother and mother attended the name dedication ceremony at the ballpark.

The ballpark was also called "League Park" in its baseball era. The ballpark began hosting minor league baseball in 1906, when the Bay City team in the Interstate Association played home games at the ballpark. Clarkston Park was located at the corner of Livingston Street and Center Avenue in Bay City. Today, the site contains commercial properties.

== Timeline ==
Year(s)	# Yrs.	Team	Level	League	Ballpark
1907	1	Bay City	Class D	Southern Michigan League	Clarkson Park
1908	1	Bay City Reds	Class D	Southern Michigan League	Clarkson Park
1909	1	Bay City Cardinals	Class D	Southern Michigan League	Clarkson Park
1910	1	Bay City	Class D	Southern Michigan League	Clarkson Park
1911–1912	2	Bay City Billikens	Class C	Southern Michigan League	Clarkson Park

== Year-by–year records ==
Year	Record	Finish	Manager	Playoffs/notes
1907	46–57	5th	M.E. Taylor	No playoffs held
1908	48–78	8th	M.E. Taylor / Clyde McNutt	No playoffs held
1909	59–66	5th	Ed Herr / Fritz Buelow	No playoffs held
1910	59–81	6th	Elbert Nugent / Leon Foy	No playoffs held
1911	73–64	4th	Mo Myers / Bo Slear	No playoffs held
1912	19–43	NA	James Slevins	Team folded July 13

== Notable alumni ==
- Tommy Atkins (1907)
- Red Bowser (1911)
- Fritz Buelow (1909, MGR)
- King Cole (1909)
- George Daly (1908)
- Ed Herr (1909, MGR)
- Ed McKean (1908)
- Ed Pinnance (1907)
- Archie Yelle (1912)

== See also ==
- Bay City Billikens players
- Bay City (minor league baseball) players
