= Jackson Convicts =

- 1906–1913; (1906–1915); Jackson, Michigan

Minor league affiliations
- Class: Class D (1906–1910, 1913); Class C (1911-1912, 1914-1915)
- League: Southern Michigan League (1906–1915)

Major league affiliations
- Team: None

Minor league titles
- League titles (0): None
- Wild card berths (0): None

Team data
- Name: Jackson Convicts (1906–1913); Jackson Chiefs (1914); Jackson Vets (1915)
- Ballpark: Keeley Park (1906–1915)

The Jackson Convicts were a minor league baseball team based in Jackson, Michigan. From 1906 to 1915, Jackson teams played as members of the Southern Michigan League for the duration of the league but did not claim a league championship in their tenure. In 1914 and 1915, Jackson played one season each known as the "Chiefs" and "Vets."

The Jackson teams hosted home minor league home games at Keeley Park. The site is still in use today as a public park.

The team "Convicts" nickname corresponded to Jackson serving as home to the Michigan State Prison in the era.

== History ==
=== 1906: Charter members Southern Michigan League ===
After minor league baseball began in Jackson with the 1888 Jackson Jaxons of the Tri-State League, the Convicts were preceded by the 1902 Jackson White Sox, who played a partial season in the Michigan State League.

On February 19, 1906, the National Commission awarded the Michigan cities of Jackson and Kalamazoo to the newly formed Southern Michigan League, after the existing Interstate League had first claimed the Kalamazoo franchise for that league.

In 1906, the Jackson Convicts became charter members of the six–team Class D level Southern Michigan League, also called the "Southern Michigan Association". The Battle Creek Crickets, Kalamazoo White Sox, Mount Clemens Bathers, Saginaw and Tecumseh Indians teams joined Jackson in beginning league play on May 6, 1906.

Jackson's "Convicts" nickname for the ballclub corresponds to the city being home to the Michigan State Prison in the era. The first state prison, located in Jackson was built in 1842. Today, the original 1842 prison site houses residential apartments, several art galleries, the Grand River Farmers Market, and the River & Rail food hub.

In their first season of play, the Convicts ended the 1906 season with a record of 52–52 to place fourth in the final Southern Michigan League standings. Managed by Mo Meyers and George Deneau, Jackson finished 17.0 games behind the first place Mount Clemens Bathers. Mount Clemens (69-34) was followed by the second place Kalamazoo White Sox (63–41), who were followed by the Tecumseh Indians (57–47), Jackson Convicts (52–52), Battle Creek Crickets (39–56) and Saginaw (34–60).

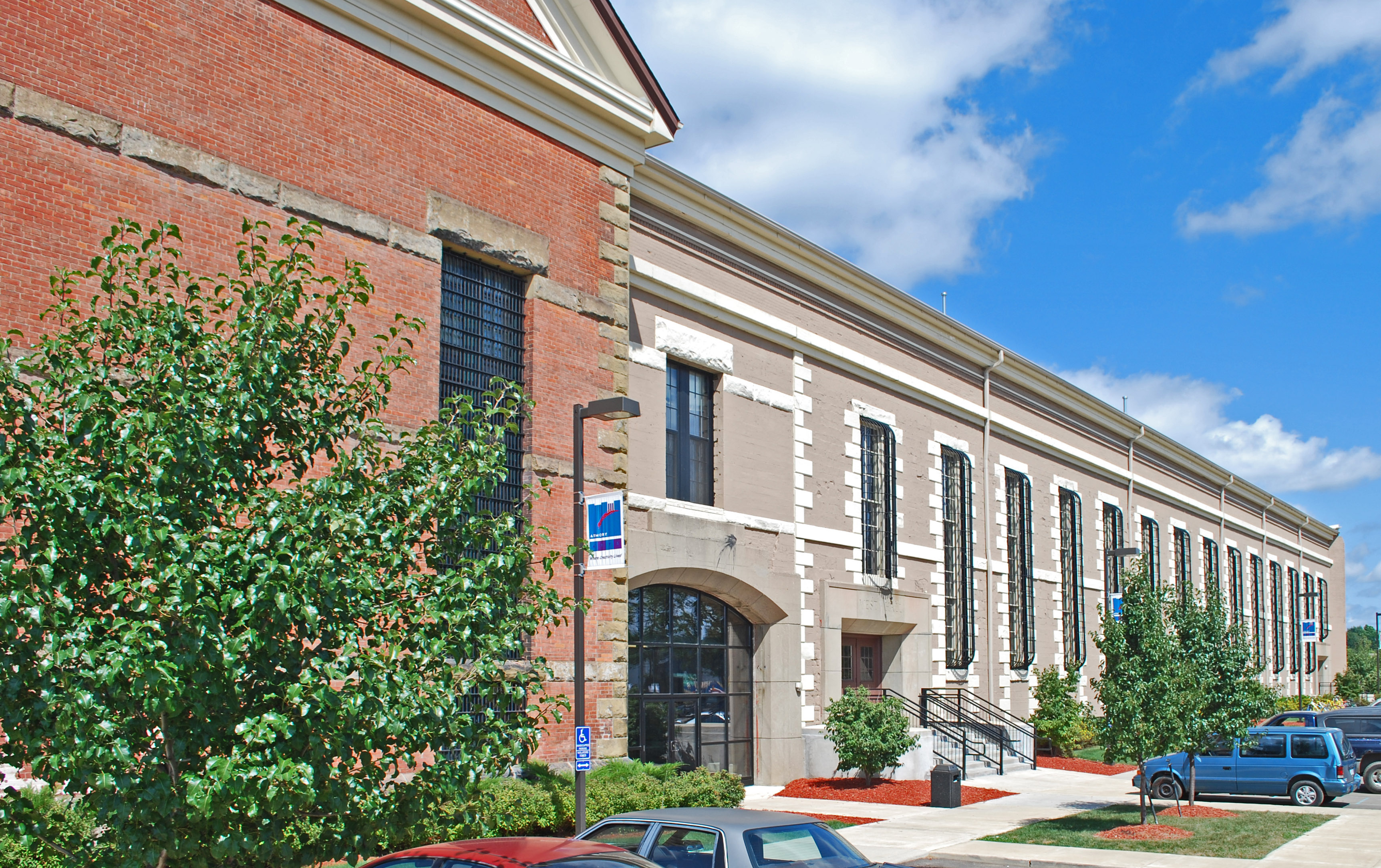
(2010) Michigan State Prison site. National Register of Historic Places. Jackson, Michigan

=== 1907 to 1915: Southern Michigan League ===
The Jackson Convicts continued play in the 1907 eight-team Southern Michigan League but folded during the season. On July 15,1907, Jackson folded with a record of 17-27 playing the partial season under manager Bruce Haynes. The Tecumseh Indians won the league championship after the league played the remainder of the season with seven teams.

Despite folding the previous season, the Convicts returned to play in the 1908 Michigan State League. On June 30, 1908, the Saginaw Wa-was and Jackson played a 20-inning game at Keeley Park in Jackson. Saginaw won the game 5-4. Jackson ended the season with a record of 68–57 and in third place. Led by manager Bo Slear, the Convicts finished the season 4½ games behind the first place Saginaw Wa-was, as the league held no playoffs.

The Convicts were involved in a close championship race in the 1909 Southern Michigan League, which held no playoffs. Jackson ended the season with a final record of 71–52 to place third in the eight-team league. Playing under returning manager, Bo Slear, the Convicts ended the season just 1.0 game behind first place Saginaw. Elmer Criger finished 22-7 to lead the league. In a close race, the Saginaw Wa-was finished with a record of 73-52, followed by the second place Flint Vehicles at 72-52 and the Convicts at 71-52.

Jackson placed seventh in the eight-team Southern Michigan League in 1910. Playing under returning manager Bo Slear, the Convicts finished with a final record of 51-85. Jackson ended the Southern Michigan League season 34½ games behind the first place Lansing Senators.

In 1911, the Southern Michigan League was upgraded from a Class D league to a Class C league and the Convicts finished in last place. With a record of 39–98 under manager Charley Fox, Jackson finished 48.0 games behind the first place Kalamazoo Celery Pickers (88-51). John Connors of Jackson won the Michigan State League batting title, hitting .377.

The Convicts finished as the runner-up in the 1912 Southern Michigan League standings. Jackson ended the season with a record of 71–55, placing second, as Mo Meyers returned as manager. The Convicts finished 3½ games behind first place Adrian Lions. Jackson's John Connors had 168 hits to lead the league.

The 1913 season was the final season for Jackson playing as the "Convicts." Jackson ended the season in third place in the eight-team Southern Michigan League, with a 66-60 record. Mo Myers continued as manager as the Convicts ended the season 15½ games behind first place Battle Creek Crickets.

Jackson continued Southern Michigan League play in 1914 and became known as the "Chiefs." The league expanded to a ten-team league. with a 70-71 record, Jackson placed sixth of the ten teams. The Chiefs were managed by Mo Meyers and Don Brown, finishing 24.0 games behind first place Bay City Beavers. Jackson did not qualify for the two-team playoff won by the Saginaw Ducks over Bay City.

In the final season of the league, the 1915 six-team Southern Michigan League folded on July 7, 1915, with the onset of World War I greatly affecting minor leagues. Jackson played as the "Vets" in 1915. When the league folded, the Vets had a record of 29-34 and finished in third place, ending 14.0 games behind first place South Bend Factors in the final standings.

The Southern Michigan League never reformed. Jackson, Michigan has not hosted another minor league team.

== The ballpark ==
Jackson teams hosted home minor league games at Keeley Park. The 7,000 capacity ballpark was located North of Ganson Street, across the Grand River from the Michigan State Prison. Today, Keeley Park, also known as the "Jackson County Fairgrounds", is still in use as a public park, with an event center and amenities. The park remains home to the annual Jackson County Fair and is located at 200 West Ganson Street.

== Timeline ==
Year(s)	# Yrs.	Team	Level	League	Ballpark
1906–1913	8	Jackson Convicts	Class D	Southern Michigan League	Keeley Park
1914	1	Jackson Chiefs	Class D	Southern Michigan League	Keeley Park
1915	1	Jackson Vets	Class D	Southern Michigan League	Keeley Park

== Year-by–year records ==
Year	Record	Finish	Manager	Playoffs/notes
1906	52–52	4th	Mo Meyers / George Deneau	No playoffs held
1907	17–27	NA	Bruce Haynes	Team folded July 15
1908	68–57	3rd	Bo Slear	No playoffs held
1909	71–53	3rd	Bo Slear	No playoffs held
1910	51–85	7th	Bo Slear	No playoffs held
1911	39–98	8th	Charley Fox	No playoffs held
1912	71–55	2nd	Mo Meyers	No playoffs held
1913	66–60	3rd	Mo Meyers	No playoffs held
1914	70–71	6th	Mo Meyers / Don Brown	Did not qualify
1915	29–34	3rd	Dan Collins	League disbanded July 7

== Notable alumni ==
- Red Bowser (1912)
- James Baxter (1915)
- Jim Brown (1913–1914)
- Wese Callahan (1915)
- Al Clauss (1912)
- Bill Dammann (1908)
- Bert Daniels (1906)
- George Deneau (1906, MGR)
- Bunny Fabrique (1908–1911)
- William Garlow (1911)
- Paddy Greene (1911)
- Arthur Hauger (1911)
- Bill James (1910)
- Bill Killefer (1907)
- Jake Pitler (1913–1915)
- Hosea Siner (1908)
- Hooks Warner (1913–1914)

== See also ==
- Jackson Convicts players
- Jackson Chiefs players
- Jackson Vets players
