= Lansing Senators =

- 1895–1942; (1895, 1897, 1902, 1907–1914, 1921–1922, 1941); Lansing, Michigan

Minor league affiliations
- Class: Class D (1897, 1902, 1906–1910, 1913); Class C (1911–1912, 1914, 1941); Class B (1895, 1921–1922)
- League: Michigan State League (1895, 1897, 1902); Southern Michigan League (1906–1914); Central League (1921-1922); Michigan State League (1941)

Major league affiliations
- Team: None

Minor league titles
- League titles (0): None
- Conference titles (1): 1910
- Wild card berths (0): None

Team data
- Name: Lansing Senators (1895, 1897, 1902, 1907–1915, 1921–1922, 1941)
- Ballpark: Parshall Park (1895, 1897, 1902); Waverly Park (1906–1915); Community Park (1921–1922); Municipal Park (1941)

The Lansing Senators were a long running minor league baseball team based in Lansing, Michigan. Between 1895 and 1941, the Lansing "Senators" teams played as members of the Michigan State League (1895, 1897, 1902), Southern Michigan League (1907–1914) and Central League (1921–1922) before a final Michigan State League season in 1941. The Senators won the Southern Michigan League pennant in 1910.

Lansing hosted home minor league games at multiple ballparks in their years of minor league play. Lansing played home games at Parshall Park (1895, 1897, 1902), Waverly Park (1906–1915), Community Park (1921–1922) and Municipal Park (1941).

Baseball Hall of Fame member Bud Fowler played for the 1895 Lansing Senators.

The 1941 Lansing Senators were the last minor league team hosted in Lansing prior to the Lansing Lugnuts beginning play in 1996.

== History ==
=== Michigan State League 1895, 1897, 1902 ===
Lansing first hosted minor league baseball in 1889 when the Lansing "Farmers" played the season as members of the Class B level Michigan State League under manager Walter Mumbry. "Lansing" continued play in the 1890 Michigan State League before the league folded on June 13, 1890.

The Lansing "Senators" joined the reformed Class B level Michigan State League in 1895. The Adrian Reformers, Battle Creek Adventists, Jackson Jaxons, Kalamazoo Celery Eaters, Owosso Colts and Port Huron Marines teams joined with Lansing in beginning league play.

The "Senators" nickname corresponds to Lansing serving as the Michigan State Capitol. When they began play, the Senators were owned by R.N. Parshall and hosted home games at Parshall Park, also called State Lot, which was located next to the Michigan State Capitol Building.

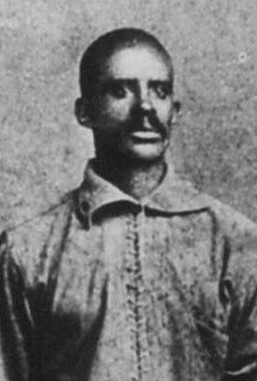
(1885) Baseball Hall of Fame member Bud Fowler. Fowler played for the Lansing Senators in 1895. Fowler hit .331 on the season and broke the league color barrier

The Senators ended the season with a record of 56–36 to place second in the Michigan State League, playing the season under managers C.A. Briggs and Al Mannassau. Lansing finished 3.5 games behind the first place Adrian Demons who had Baseball Hall of Fame members Bud Fowler and Honus Wagner on their roster during the season.

Bud Fowler played for Lansing during the 1895 season after being acquired from Adrian, with Fowler breaking the color barrier in the league. Playing at age 47, Fowler was the only black player in the minor leagues in 1895. Overall, Fowler hit .331 in the Michigan State League playing for Adrian and Lansing. After ending the season with Lansing, Fowler did not play again in organized minor league baseball, due to the evolution of the color barrier. Fowler said, "My skin is against me. If I had not been quite so black, I might have caught on as a Spaniard or something of that kind. The race prejudice is so strong that my black skin barred me."

The Michigan State League did not return to minor league play in 1896. In 1897, the Michigan State League reformed with Lansing as a member before both folded during the season. On July 27, 1897, Lansing folded with a record of 41–31, as Thomas Robinson served as the manager of the Senators. On August 16, 1897, the Michigan State League folded, with the Bay City team in first place.

In 1902, the Michigan State League again reformed as a minor league, with Lansing as a member of the six-team Class D level league. On August 20, 1902, the Lansing Senators team folded causing the entire league to fold on that date. The Grand Rapids Colts team had folded earlier in the season. The Senators ended the shortened season with a record of 35–62 and in fourth place, finishing 24.5 games behind the first place Battle Creek Cero Frutos. Joe Katz, Walter Niles and Wilson Hosmer served as managers during the season.

=== Southern Michigan League 1907 to 1915 ===
In 1906, the six–team Class D level Southern Michigan League, also called the "Southern Michigan Association" was formed without a Lansing franchise. The Battle Creek Crickets, Jackson Convicts, Kalamazoo White Sox, Mount Clemens Bathers, Saginaw and Tecumseh Indians teams were the charter members.

In 1907, the Lansing Senators resumed play in the new League. The Southern Michigan League expanded to become an eight-team league, adding the Lansing Senators and Flint Vehicles as expansion teams. With a record of 46–57, Lansing played the partial season under manager Jack Morrissey. A Lansing native, Morrissey was a former major league player who had played for the 1895 Lansing Senators. Morrissey managed the Senators for their eight seasons of Central League play. Lansing ended the season 19.0 games behind the first place Tecumseh Indians. Tecumseh won the league championship after the league played the remainder of the season with seven teams after Jackson folded during the season.

The Lansing Senators continued play in the 1908 Southern Michigan League. The Senators ended the season with a record of 60–65 and in sixth place. Led by manager Jack Morrissey, the Senators finished the season 12.5 games behind the first place Saginaw Wa-was, as the league held no playoffs. Lansing player/manager John Morrissey led the Southern Michigan with 141 total hits, while teammate George Pierce had 295 strikeouts to lead the league pitchers.

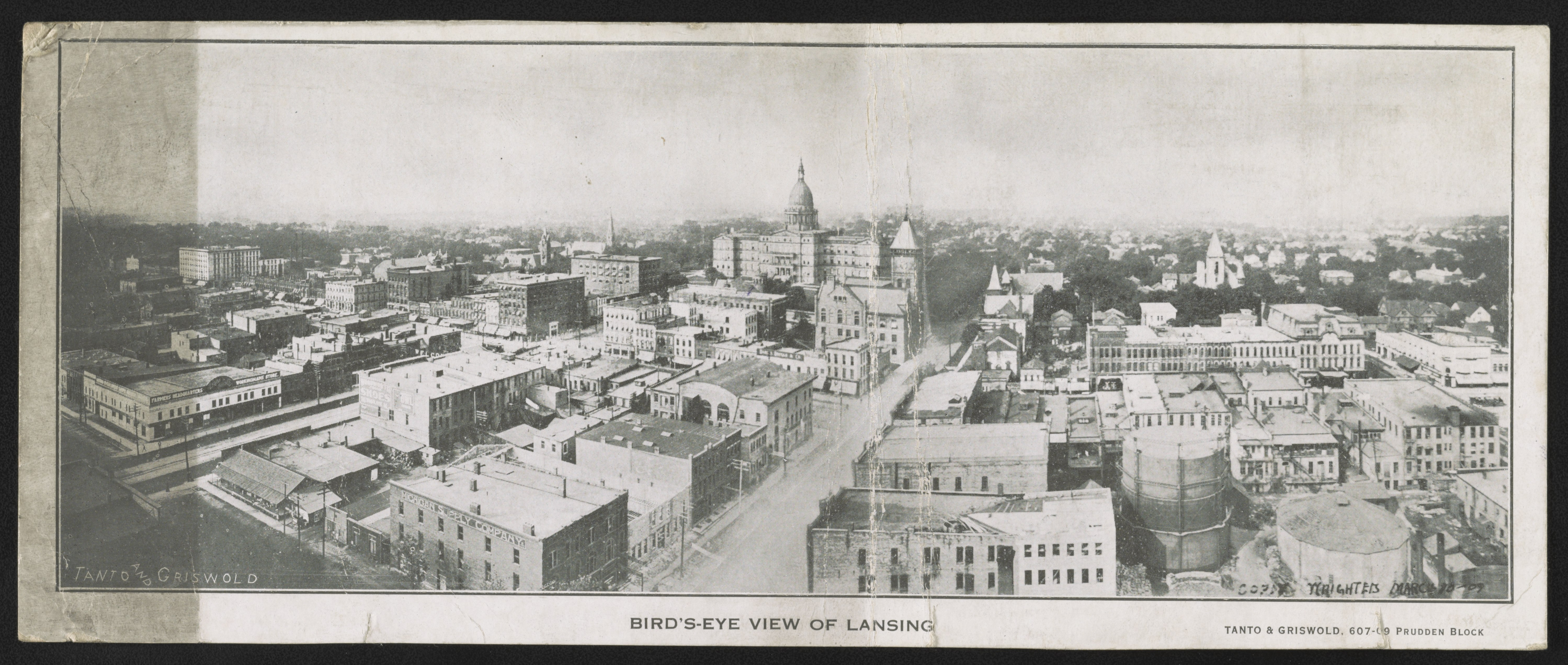
(1909) State Capitol area view. Lansing, Michigan

The Senators again placed sixth in the eight-team 1909 Southern Michigan League, which held no playoffs. Lansing ended the season with a final record of 55–69 to place sixth, playing under returning manager Jack Morrissey. The Senators ended the season 17.5 games behind the first place Saginaw Wa-was.

The 1910 Lansing Senators won the league pennant as the team tied for first place in the eight-team Southern Michigan League. Playing under continuing manager Jack Morrissey, the Senators finished with a final record of 87-52 and ended the season in a first-place tie with the Kalamazoo Kazoos, who had an identical record. The two first place teams ended the Southern Michigan League season 4.0 games ahead of the third place Adrian Yeggs. Due to the tie in the standings, a playoff series was held, and Kalamazoo beat Lansing 4 games to 2 in the finals. Lansing's Vic Saier led the league with 175 total hits and pitcher Homer Warner led the Southern Michigan League with 23 wins.

In 1911, the Southern Michigan League was upgraded from a Class D level league to a Class C level league and the Senators ended the season in second place. With a record of 79–55 under manager Jack Morrissey, Lansing finished 6.5 games behind the first place Kalamazoo Celery Pickers (88-51). Pitcher Ed Warner of Lansing led Michigan State League with both 26 wins and 231 strikeouts.

The Senators finished above .500 in the 1912 Southern Michigan League standings. Lansing ended the season with a record of 63–62, placing fourth, as Jack Morrissey continued as manager. The Senators finished 15.0 games behind first place Adrian Lions. Albert "Bull" Durham, who spilt the season between Bay City and Lansing, led the league with 25 home runs. The 25 home runs set a new Southern Michigan League record.

The 1913 Lansing Senators ended the Southern Michigan League season in seventh place in the final standings. Lansing finished the season near the bottom of the eight-team Southern Michigan League, with a 54-68 record. Jack Morrissey continued as manager as the Senators ended the season 22.5 games behind first place Battle Creek Crickets. Lansing's T.H. McNellis led the Southern Michigan League with 146 total hits.

The 1914 Lansing Senators continued Southern Michigan League play before relocating during the season. The league expanded to a ten-team league to begin the season. On July 10, 1915, the Senators had a 33–35 record when the team moved to Mount Clemens, Michigan. After compiling a record of 30–45 playing as the Mount Clemens Bathers, the Senators/Bathers had an overall record of 63–80 record, as the team placed seventh of the ten teams. The Senators were managed by Jack Morrissey for the final time, with the team finishing 31.5 games behind first place Bay City Beavers. The Senators/Bathers did not qualify for the two-team playoff won by the Saginaw Ducks over Bay City.

In the final season of the league, the 1915 six-team Southern Michigan League folded on July 7, 1915, without the Mount Clemens Bathers or Lansing Senators returning to play. The onset of World War I greatly affected minor leagues as many leagues and teams folded. The Southern Michigan League never reformed.

=== Central League 1921 & 1922 ===
Lansing was without a minor league team until 1921, when the Lansing Senators resumed play becoming members of the Class B level Central League. The league expanded from a four team to a six-team league in 1921, adding the Lansing Senators and Jackson Mayors teams to the league. The Grand Rapids Joshers, Kalamazoo Celery Pickers, Ludington Mariners, Muskegon Muskies and Jackson Mayors teams joined Lansing in 1921 league play.

On May 10, 1921, a parade was held to dedicate the new baseball park for the Lansing Senators. The parade went from downtown Lansing to the ballpark site on South Pennsylvania Avenue, just north of the Potter Park Zoo. The new ballpark was called Community Park.

Fred Balding was the president of the Lansing Central League franchise in 1921. The Senators franchise was awarded a trophy by the Central League for having the league's largest opening day attendance.

The Lansing Senators had a record of 65–63 and finished in third place in the final Central League standings. The 1921 managers were Newt Hunter and Jesse Altenburg, as the Senators finished 21.5 games behind the first place Ludington Mariners in the six-team league. Lansing pitcher Lawrence Reno led the Central League with 133 strikeouts.

In 1922, Newt Hunter returned as the Lansing Senators manager. With a record of 60–67, the Senators ended the season in fifth place in the six-team Central League. Lansing ended the season 15.5 games behind the first place Ludington Mariners. The Senators did not qualify for the playoff, where the Grand Rapids Billbobs defeated Ludington to win the league title. Charles Miller of Lexington hit 12 home runs to lead the Central League. The Central League did not return to play in 1923.

=== Michigan State League 1941 ===
After a nearly two-decade hiatus, Lansing minor league baseball returned in 1941, as the Michigan State League played its final season, and the Lansing "Senators" nickname was revived after 19 years. The 1940 Lansing "Lancers" became members of the Michigan State League before the "Senators" nickname returned in 1941. The Senators finished in last place in the 1941, ending the season with a record of 35–78. The Senators finished in sixth place in the six-team league. Danny Taylor and Russ Wein managed Lansing as the Senators ended the season 37.5 games behind the first place Flint Indians. No playoffs were held in the final season of the league.

The Michigan State League permanently folded following the 1941 season. Lansing was without minor league baseball until the 1996 Lansing Lugnuts became members of the Class A level Midwest League, where they continue minor league play today.

== The ballparks ==
The Lansing Senators first played minor league home games at the Parshall Park in their 1895, 1897 and 1902 seasons. The site was also called State Lot. The ballpark was named for the owner of the Senators, R. N. Parhsall. The ballpark was located near the Michigan State Capitol Building, bordered by Walnut Street, Chestnut Street, Washtenau Street and Kalamazoo Street in Lansing, Michigan. No Sunday games were held at Parshall Park.

As there were no Sunday games held at Parshall Park, Sunday games in 1897 and 1902 were held at the Fairgrounds Driving Park. The park was located on East Michigan Avenue between Magnolia Street and Mifflin Street in Lansing, Michigan.

The Senator teams of the Southern Michigan League from 1907 to 1914 hosted home games at League Park, also known as Waverly Park. The ballpark was located at South Walnut and West Kalamazoo in Lansing. The ballpark site was adjacent to the Parshall Park site.

When the Senators joined the Central League for the 1921 and 1922 seasons, the teams hosted minor league home games at Community Park. The ballpark had a covered grandstand. Community Park was torn down for a power company facility in the 1920's. The ballpark site was located on South Pennsylvania Avenue, south of Hazel Street and NE of the Huron River. Potter Park is near the former ballpark site. Today, Potter Park contains the Potter Park Zoo and is located at 1301 South Pennsylvania Avenue in Lansing, Michigan.

In their final season, the 1941 Lansing Senators hosted home games at Municipal Park. The ballpark was constructed in 1926 and is still in use today, known as Sycamore Park. The park is located at South Pennsylvania and Lindbergh Drive in Lansing, near Potter Park. Today, Sycamore Park is located at 1415 South Pennsylvania Avenue in Lansing, Michigan.

== Timeline ==
Year(s)	# Yrs.	Team	Level	League	Ballpark
1895	1	Lansing Senators	Class B	Michigan State League	Parshall Park
1897, 1902	2	Lansing Senators	Class D	Michigan State League	Parshall Park
1907–1910	4	Lansing Senators	Class D	Southern Michigan League	Waverly Park
1911	1	Lansing Senators	Class C	Southern Michigan League	Waverly Park
1912–1913	2	Lansing Senators	Class D	Southern Michigan League	Waverly Park
1914	1	Lansing Senators	Class C	Southern Michigan League	Waverly Park
1921–1922	2	Lansing Senators	Class B	Central League	Community Park
1941	1	Lansing Senators	Class C	Michigan State League	Municipal Park

== Year-by-year records ==
Year	Record	Finish	Manager	Playoffs/notes
1895	56–36	2nd	C.A. Briggs / Al Mannassau	No playoffs held
1897	41–31	NA	Thomas Robinson	Team folded July 27
1902	35–62	4th	Joe Katz / Walter Niles; Wilson Hosmer	Team and league folded August 20.
1907	46–57	6th	Jack Morrissey	No playoffs held
1908	60–65	6th	Jack Morrissey	No playoffs held
1909	55–69	6th	Jack Morrissey	No playoffs held
1910	87–52	1st (t)	Jack Morrissey	Tied for pennant Lost in playoff
1911	79–55	2nd	Jack Morrissey	No playoffs held
1912	63–62	4th	Jack Morrissey	No playoffs held
1913	54–69	7th	Jack Morrissey	No playoffs held
1914	63–80	7th	Jack Morrissey	Lansing (33–35) moved to Mt. Clemens July 10; Did not qualify
1921	65–63	3rd	Jesse Altenburg / Newt Hunter	No playoffs held
1922	60–67	5th	Newt Hunter	Did not qualify
1941	35–78	6th	Danny Taylor / Russ Wein	No playoffs held

== Notable alumni ==
- Bud Fowler (1895) Inducted Baseball Hall of Fame (2022)
- Joe Agler (1907)
- Jesse Altenburg (1921, MGR)
- Les Bell (1922)
- Jimmy Burke (1897)
- Babe Doty (1897)
- Charlie Ferguson (1895)
- Cecil Ferguson (1902)
- Ed Hemingway (1912–1913)
- Newt Hunter (1921, MGR)
- Ed Kippert (1902)
- Al Mannassau (1895, MGR)
- Jack Morrissey (1895; 1907–1914, MGR)
- Frank Oberlin (1902)
- Eddie Onslow (1911–1912)
- Jay Parker (1897)
- George Pierce (1907–1908)
- Ed Porray (1910)
- Everett Robinson (1916)
- Vic Saier (1910)
- Danny Smick (1916)
- Vern Spencer (1914)
- Danny Taylor (1941, MGR)
- Walt Thomas (1907–1908)
- Ed Warner (1911)
- Archie Yelle (1911)

== See also ==
- Lansing Senators players
