= Battle Creek Crickets =

- 1906–1915; Battle Creek, Michigan

Minor league affiliations
- Class: Class D (1906–1910, 1913); Class C (1911-1912, 1914-1915)
- League: Southern Michigan League (1906–1915)

Major league affiliations
- Team: None

Minor league titles
- League titles (1): 1913
- Wild card berths (0): None

Team data
- Name: Battle Creek Crickets (1906–1915)
- Ballpark: Athletic Park (1906–1915)

The Battle Creek Crickets were a minor league baseball team based in Battle Creek, Michigan. From 1906 to 1915, the "Crickets" played as members of the Southern Michigan League for the duration of the league, winning the 1913 league championship.

The Battle Creek Crickets teams hosted their home minor league games at Athletic Park.

== History ==
=== 1906 season ===
After minor league baseball began in Battle Creek in 1895, with the Battle Creek "Adventists," who played the season as members of the Class B level Michigan State League. The Crickets were immediately preceded by the 1902 Battle Creek "Cero Frutos," who played one season in returning to membership in the Michigan State League.

On January 29, 1906, the Southern Michigan League was formed at a meeting in held in Battle Creek. In the meeting, Joe Jackson, the sports editor of the Detroit Free Press newspaper was named as league president. The league schedule was created and called for each team to play three league games a week, with a salary limit of $800 per month per team. On February 19, 1906, the National Commission awarded the Michigan cities of Jackson and Kalamazoo to the newly formed Southern Michigan League, after the existing Interstate Association had first claimed the Kalamazoo franchise for that league.

In 1906, the Battle Creek Crickets became charter members of the six–team Class D level Southern Michigan League, also called the "Southern Michigan Association". The Jackson Convicts, Kalamazoo White Sox, Mount Clemens Bathers, Saginaw and Tecumseh Indians teams joined Battle Creek in beginning league play on May 6, 1906.

On May 5, 1906, Battle Creek beat the "Burroughs Adding Machine" team from Detroit by the score of 9-2. There were an estimated 1,000 fans at Battle Creek. At their home opener on May 15, 1906, the Crickets defeated beat Kalamazoo 7-4 in front of 2,400 fans.

During the season, on June 27, 1906, Battle Creek manager George Black, was arrested in Mt. Clemens for allegedly punching Umpire O’Connor. An arbiter refused to file a complaint against Black, so the case was dismissed.

Battle Creek began the season playing poorly. On July 16, 1906, after their poor start, Battle Creek released almost its entire roster, keeping only three players: Jack Landry, Mike Keveney and Waddell. Battle Creek then acquired some players from the folded Flint Vehicles, following the demise of the Interstate Association weeks earlier. Despite the team's performance on the field, Battle Creek had the league’s best attendance totals, often exceeding attendance of 2,000 for Sunday games.

On July 18, 1906, after the Southern Michigan League began league play, the Saginaw team was added to the league. Saginaw was given a record of 15-20 when added to the league, with Battle Creek then given an identical record to Saginaw. On July 21, 1906, the Battle Creek record of 4-38 was expunged and the reorganized team was awarded a record of 15-20 on July 22. The teams' records were adjusted to enhance league balance and competitiveness. The Battle Creek and Saginaw teams were granted an “average start on an even basis,” where both teams’ won-loss records were recalculated using an average of the league’s standings - a record halfway between the first and last place clubs.

In their first season of play, the Crickets ended the 1906 season with the adjusted record of 39–56 to place fifth in the final Southern Michigan League standings. Managed by Cal Wenger, Joe Ganzel, Mo Meyers and George Black, Battle Creek finished 26.0 games behind the first place Mount Clemens Bathers. Mount Clemens (69-34) was followed by the second place Kalamazoo White Sox (63–41), who were followed by the Tecumseh Indians (57–47), Jackson Convicts (52–52), Battle Creek Crickets (39–56) and Saginaw (34–60).

=== 1907 to 1910 seasons ===
The Battle Creek Crickets continued play in the 1907 eight-team Southern Michigan League and placed third in the standings as the league expanded to eight teams. During the 1907 season, shortstop/manager William "Curly" Henderson was suspended for the remainder of the season on suspicion of purposefully throwing a game with a wild throw to George Deneau playing first base. Henderson claimed that the ball went only a foot above Deneau's head and should have been caught. The Crickets ended the season with a record of 63-49 playing the season under managers Henderson and George Deneau. The Tecumseh Indians won the league championship as the league played the remainder of the season with seven teams after Jackson folded during the season.

On April 26, 1908, the Battle Creek Crickets played their first exhibition game against the local Battle Creek Independents team.

In the 1908 Southern Michigan League standings, Battle Creek placed fifth in the eight-team league as the Jackson Convicts returned to play. Jackson and Battle Creek would play in every season of the league. Battle Creek ended the season with a record of 62–63, led by returning player/ managers William Henerson and George Deneau. The Crickets finished the season 10.5 games behind the first place Saginaw Wa-was, as the league held no playoffs.

The Crickets finished last in the eight-team 1909 Southern Michigan League, which held no playoffs. Jackson ended the season with a final record of 52–74 to place eighth in the eight-team league. Playing under returning manager George Deneau, the Crickets ended the season 21.5 games behind first place Saginaw.

Battle Creek placed fourth in the eight-team league in 1910. Playing under manager Billy Earle, the Crickets finished with a final record of 72-64. Battle Creen ended the Southern Michigan League season 13.5 games behind the first place Lansing Senators.

=== 1911 to 1915 seasons ===
In 1911, the Southern Michigan League was upgraded from a Class D league to a Class C league and the Crickets ended the season in seventh place. With a record of 57–80, playing the season under manager John Burke, Battle Creek finished 30.0 games behind the first place Kalamazoo Celery Pickers (88-51). Pete Compton of Battle Creek had 25 triples to lead the Michigan State League.

The Crickets finished sixth in the 1912 Southern Michigan League standings. Battle Creek ended the season with a record of 59–68, with Ed McKernan as manager. The Crickets finished 20.0 games behind first place Adrian Lions. Jackson's John Connors had 168 hits to lead the league.

The 1913 Battle Creek Crickets won their only Southern Michigan League championship. In the eight-team league, the Crickets ended the season with a 77-46 record and in first place. Ed McKernan continued as manager as the Crickets won the championship and ended the season 9.0 games ahead of the second place Battle Adrian Lions. Battle Creek pitcher Dick Niehaus led the Southern Michigan League with 24 wins.

Battle Creek was the defending Southern Michigan League champions in 1914 and placed third. The league expanded to a ten-team league. with a 92-57 record, Battle Creek placed third in the regular season overall standings, as the league playoff after it expanded to ten teams. The Crickets were managed by Dan Collins and finished 5.5 games behind first place Bay City Beavers. Battle Creek did not qualify for the two-team playoff won by the Saginaw Ducks over Bay City. Saginaw had finished in second place in the final regular season standings, mere percentage points ahead of Battle Creek.

In the final season of the league, the 1915 six-team Southern Michigan League folded on July 7, 1915, with the onset of World War I greatly affecting minor leagues. When the league folded, the Crickets had a record of 34-33 and finished in second place, ending 9.0 games behind first place South Bend Factors in the final standings.

The Southern Michigan League never returned to play. Battle Creen, Michigan next hosted minor league baseball when the 1919 Battle Creek Custers became members of the Class B level Michigan-Ontario League.

== The ballpark ==
The Battle Creek Crickets hosted home minor league games at Athletic Park. The ballpark was located on the northern shore of Goguac Lake near Highland Avenue & Surby Avenue.

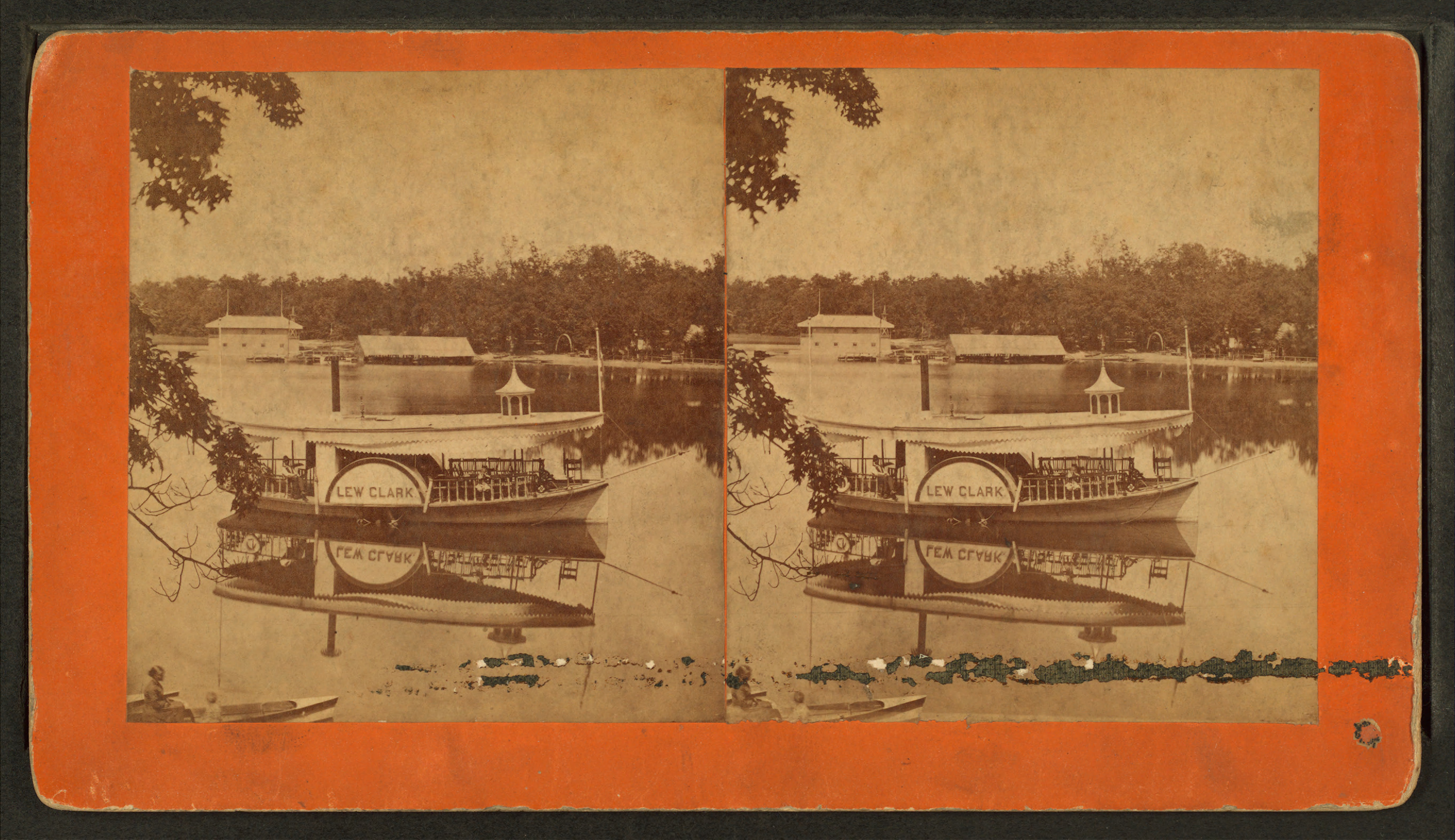
( 1900) Goguac Lake. Battle Creek, Michigan

== Timeline ==
Year(s)	# Yrs.	Team	Level	League	Ballpark
1906–1910	5	Battle Creek Crickets	Class D	Southern Michigan League	Athletic Park
1911–1912	2	Battle Creek Crickets	Class C	Southern Michigan League	Athletic Park
1913	1	Battle Creek Crickets	Class D	Southern Michigan League	Athletic Park
1914–1915	2	Battle Creek Crickets	Class C	Southern Michigan League	Athletic Park

== Year-by–year records ==
Year	Record	Finish	Manager	Playoffs/notes
1906	39–56	5th	Cal Wenger/ Joe Ganzel; Mo Meyers / George Black	No playoffs held 4-38 record adjusted by the league
1907	63–49	3rd	William Henderson / George Deneau	No playoffs held
1908	62–63	5th	George Deneau	No playoffs held
1909	52–74	8th	George Deneau	No playoffs held
1910	72–64	4th	Billy Earle	No playoffs held
1911	57–80	7th	John Burke	No playoffs held
1912	59–68	6th	Ed McKernan	No playoffs held
1913	77–46	1st	Ed McKernan	No playoffs held League champions
1914	92–57	3rd	Dan Collins	Did not qualify
1915	34–33	2nd	Charles Wagner	League disbanded July 7

== Notable alumni ==
- Ray Brubaker (1900)
- Wese Callahan (1912-1913)
- Pete Compton (1911)
- Bill Culp (1908)
- George Deneau (1907-1909, MGR)
- Pat Duncan (1914-1915)
- Billy Earle (1910, MGR)
- Pete Fahrer (1912)
- Larry Gilbert (1911-1912)
- Oscar Graham (1913)
- Grover Hartley (1909)
- Baby Doll Jacobson (1910)
- Katsy Keifer (1914)
- Charlie Krause (1907)
- Harry LaRoss (1912-1914)
- Paul Maloy (1915)
- Garland Nevitt (1911-1913)
- Dick Niehaus (1912-1913)
- Clint Rogge (1909-1910)
- Dutch Zwilling (1909-1910)

== See also ==
- Battle Creek Crickets players
