= James Baxter (American football) =

American football player, coach and baseball player (1892–1961)

Biographical details
- Born: October 1, 1892; Toledo, Ohio, U.S.
- Died: July 26, 1961 (aged 68); Toledo, Ohio, U.S.
- Education: Kenyon

Playing career

Football
- 1916–1919: Toledo Maroons
- 1923: Racine Legion
- 1924: Kenosha Maroons

Baseball
- 1914: Toledo Mud Hens
- 1915: Jackson Vets
- 1915: Flint Vehicles
- 1927: Toledo Mud Hens
- Positions: Quarterback, defensive back (football); Relief pitcher (baseball)

Coaching career (HC unless noted)

Football
- 1918: Toledo

Head coaching record
- Overall: 1–1

James Richard Baxter (October 1, 1892 – July 26, 1961) was an American minor league baseball player and football player and coach.

== Minor League Baseball ==
Baxter played for the Toledo Mud Hens of the Southern Michigan League in 1914 and later the American Association in 1927. He also played for the Jackson Vets and Flint Vehicles of the Southern Michigan League in 1915.

== College football coach ==
Baxter served as the head football coach at University of Toledo for a lone season in 1918, compiling a record of 1–1.

== Professional football ==
Baxter played for two season in the National Football League (NFL), first for the Racine Legion in 1923 and later for the Kenosha Maroons in 1924.

== Head coaching record ==
Year	Team	Overall	Conference	Standing	Bowl/playoffs
Toledo Blue and Gold (Independent) (1918)
1918	Toledo	1–1			
Toledo:		1–1			
Total:		1–1			
