= South Bend, Indiana minor league baseball history =

South Bend, Indiana minor league baseball teams
- 1888–1932; (1888, 1903–1912, 1914–1917, 1932, 1988-present); South Bend, Indiana

Minor league affiliations
- Class: Independent (1888); Class B (1903–1912); Class C (1914–1915); Class B (1916–1917, 1932); Class A (1988-present)
- League: Indiana State League (1888); Central League (1903–1912); Southern Michigan League (1914–1915); Central League (1916–1917, 1932); Midwest League (1988-present)

Major league affiliations
- Team: None

Minor league titles
- League titles (2): 1910; 1915

Team data
- Name: South Bend Green Stockings (1888, 1903); South Bend Greens (1904–1909); South Bend Bronchos (1910); South Bend Benders (1911–1912); South Bend Bux (1911); South Bend Benders (1914); South Bend Factors (1915); South Bend Benders (1916–1917); South Bend Twins (1932); South Bend White Sox (1988–1993); South Bend Silver Hawks (1994–2014); South Bend Cubs (2015–present)
- Ballpark: Greenstocking Park (1888); Springbrook Park (1903–1912, 1914–1917, 1932)

Minor league baseball teams have been based in South Bend, Indiana since 1888. South Bend teams played as members of the Indiana State League (1888), Central League (1903–1912), Southern Michigan League (1914–1915) and the Central League (1916–1917, 1932) under numerous monikers. These South Bend teams directly preceded South Bend becoming a Midwest League franchise in 1988. They remain in minor league play today as the South Bend Cubs.

In 1888, South Bend played home games at Greenstocking Park. In the minor league seasons between 1903 and 1932, South Bend hosted minor league home games at Springbrook Park.

== History ==
=== Indiana State League 1888 ===
Early semi–pro teams named the South Bend Green Stockings began playing in 1878. Greenstocking Park was built in 1878 and hosted the early South Bend baseball teams.

The 1888 South Bend Green Stockings were the first minor league baseball team in South Bend, Indiana, playing as members of the Independent level Indiana State League under manager Bootsey Johnson. South Bend played at Greenstocking Park in 1888.

=== Central League 1903–1912 ===
The South Bend Green Stockings were Charter members of the Class B level Central League in 1903. With a record of 88–50, the Green Stockings placed second in the Central League. The Green Stockings' manager was Angus Grant, who had managed the semi–professional team of the same name that preceded the 1903 Green Stockings. Grant would begin an eight–year tenure as South Bend manager, where he compiled 504 total wins. South Bend finished 1.0 games behind the first place Fort Wayne Railroaders and ahead of the Anderson/Grand Rapids Orphans (48–92), Dayton Veterans (61–76) Evansville River Rats (64–68), Marion Oilworkers (71–65), Terre Haute Hottentots (58–80) and Wheeling Stogies (69–68) in the final standings. The Green Stockings began play at Springbrook Park, where they would play all home games through 1932.

Becoming the South Bend Greens in the 1904 Central League, South Bend placed third in the league standings. The Greens finished with a record of 75–65 in the Central League, continuing under manager Angus Grant.

The 1905 South Bend Greens continued to play as members of the Class B level Central League. Managed by Angus Grant, the Greens placed third in the league with a 77–62 regular season record. South Bend finished 5.5 games behind the first place Wheeling Stogies.

The South Bend Greens placed seventh in the eight–team 1906 Central League. They finished with a record of 62–88, under Angus Grant, finishing 36.5 games behind the first place Grand Rapids Wolverines.

Continuing play in the 1907 Central League, the South Bend Greens finished last in the league standings. Managed by Angus Grant, South Bend finished with a 53–86 record to place eighth in the Central League standings, ending the season 35.0 games behind the first place Springfield Babes. On June 16, 1907, South Bend pitcher Roy Keener pitched a no–hitter against the Dayton Veterans, as South Bend defeated Dayton 4–0.

In 1908, the South Bend Greens finished in second place in the Central League final standings. With a record of 80–60 under manager Angus Grant, South Bend finished 4.0 games behind the first place Evansville River Rats and 3.0 games ahead of the third place Dayton Veterans. South Bend pitcher Cy Alberts pitched a no–hitter on May 11, 1908, as the Greens defeated the Wheeling Stogies 7–0.

The 1909 South Bend Greens placed sixth in the Central League, managed by Angus Grant. The Greens had a record of 64–72. South Bend finished 20.5 games behind the league champion Wheeling Stooges. Baseball Hall of Fame member Max Carey made his professional debut for South Bend, as a 19-year–old. Carey hit .158, playing in 48 games.

The South Bend Bronchos won the 1910 Central League Championship. With a regular season record of 88–50, South Bend finished first in the standings under managers Ed Wheeler and Midge Craven. South Bend finished 8.5 games ahead of the second place Fort Wayne Billikens in the final league standings. Baseball Hall of Famer Max Carey remained with South Bend for a second season and hit .293, with 36 stolen bases for the 1910 Bronchos championship team.

South Bend hosted two separate teams in the 1911 Central League. The South Bend team began the 1911 season as the South Bend Benders. On July 13, 1911, the South Bend Benders then moved to Grand Rapids, Michigan, where they became the Grand Rapids Grads. The South Bend/Grand Rapids team was 42–36 in South Bend and finished 73–61 overall, placing fourth in the Central League. Their manager in both locations was Ed Smith.

The second South Bend team of 1911 was the South Bend Bux, also playing in the Central League. On August 11, 1911, the Evansville Strikers moved to South Bend with a 54–54 record. The Evansville/South Bend team finished with an overall record of 62–72. The Bux finished in fifth place. playing under managers Harry Arndt and the returning Angus Grant.

South Bend remained in the 1912 Central League, returning to the South Bend "Benders" moniker. On the field, the team placed last in the 12–team Central League, after the league had expanded. South Bend ended the season with a record of 41–88, finishing 36.0 games behind the first Place Fort Wayne Railroaders. The South Bend franchise folded after the season and did not return to the 1913 Central League.

=== Southern Michigan League 1914–1915 / Central League 1916–1917 ===
In 1914, the South Bend Benders returned to play as members of the Class C level Southern Michigan League, also called the Southern Michigan "Association." In their first Southern Michigan League season, South Bend placed fourth in the ten–team league. The Benders finished with a record of 85–60, ending the season 10.5 games behind the first place Bay City Beavers. The 1914 managers were Ed Smith and Ben Koehler.

The South Bend Factors won the 1915 Southern Michigan League Championship. The South Bend Factors were in first place in the league standings when the league folded mid–season. The Southern Michigan League permanently disbanded on July 7, 1915. With a 44–24 record, South Bend placed first, playing the season under manager Ed Smith. South Bend finished 10.5 games ahead of the second place Battle Creek Crickets in the six–team league.

South Bend returned to play as members of the Class B level Central League in 1916, continuing play at Springbrook Park. The 1916 South Bend Benders placed seventh in the eight–team Central League. With a record of 56–77, South Bend finished 31.5 games behind the champion Grand Rapids Black Sox. The 1916 Benders' managers were Ben Koehler and Lee Tannehill.

The 1917 South Bend Benders moved to Peoria, Illinois during the Central League season and the team made the playoffs. On July 8, 1917, South Bend had a record of 40–20, playing under player/manager Bill Jackson, when the franchise moved to Peoria to finish the season as the Peoria Distillers. With an overall record of 66–55, South Bend/Peoria placed third in the Central League final standings. They were managed by Harry Smith (26–35) and Jackson. In the 1917 Playoffs, the Grand Rapids Black Sox defeated the South Bend Benders/Peoria Distillers 4 games to 3.

=== Central League 1932 ===
South Bend was without a minor league team until the 1932 South Bend Twins played as members of the Central League. The Twins permanently folded on July 21, 1932, along with the Canton Terriers. The South Bend Twins had a record of 29–57 and were in fifth place in the six–team league when the franchise folded. The 1932 managers were Jesse Altenburg, Clarence Roper and Whitey Belber. The 1932 South Bend Twins were the last minor league team in South Bend until 1988.

After the minor league teams, the South Bend Blue Sox women's teams played as members of the All-American Girls Professional Baseball League (AAGPBL) from 1943 to 1954. The South Bend Blue Sox and the famed Rockford Peaches were the only two teams to play for the duration of the AAGBPL.

=== 1988–present ===
In 1988, South Bend resumed minor league play when the South Bend White Sox became members of the Class A level Midwest League. The South Bend Cubs, continue minor league play today.

== The ballparks ==
In 1888, South Bend played minor league home games at Greenstocking Park. Built in 1878 for the semi–pro South Bend Green Stockings, Greenstocking Park had a capacity of 2,000 to 2,500. The ballpark was located on the plot bordered by Napier Street, Thomas Street and McPherson Street in South Bend, Indiana. The ballpark site was across the street from the adjacent St. Stephens School in the era. Today, the school is still in use as the El Capito Center at 1024 Thomas Street.

Beginning in 1903, through 1932, South Bend teams played home games at Springbrook Park. The ballpark and surrounding park area were later renamed Playland Park in 1925 after the Northern Indiana Railway Company purchased the Springbrook Park grounds. The Northern Indiana Railway Company utilized the area as an amusement park and picnic area for train riders. The ballpark had a capacity of 3,500. Springboard Park was located south of the St. Joseph River near Ironwood Road and Lincoln Way East Drive in South Bend, Indiana, which was later repurposed to accommodate for Indiana University-South Bend student apartments.

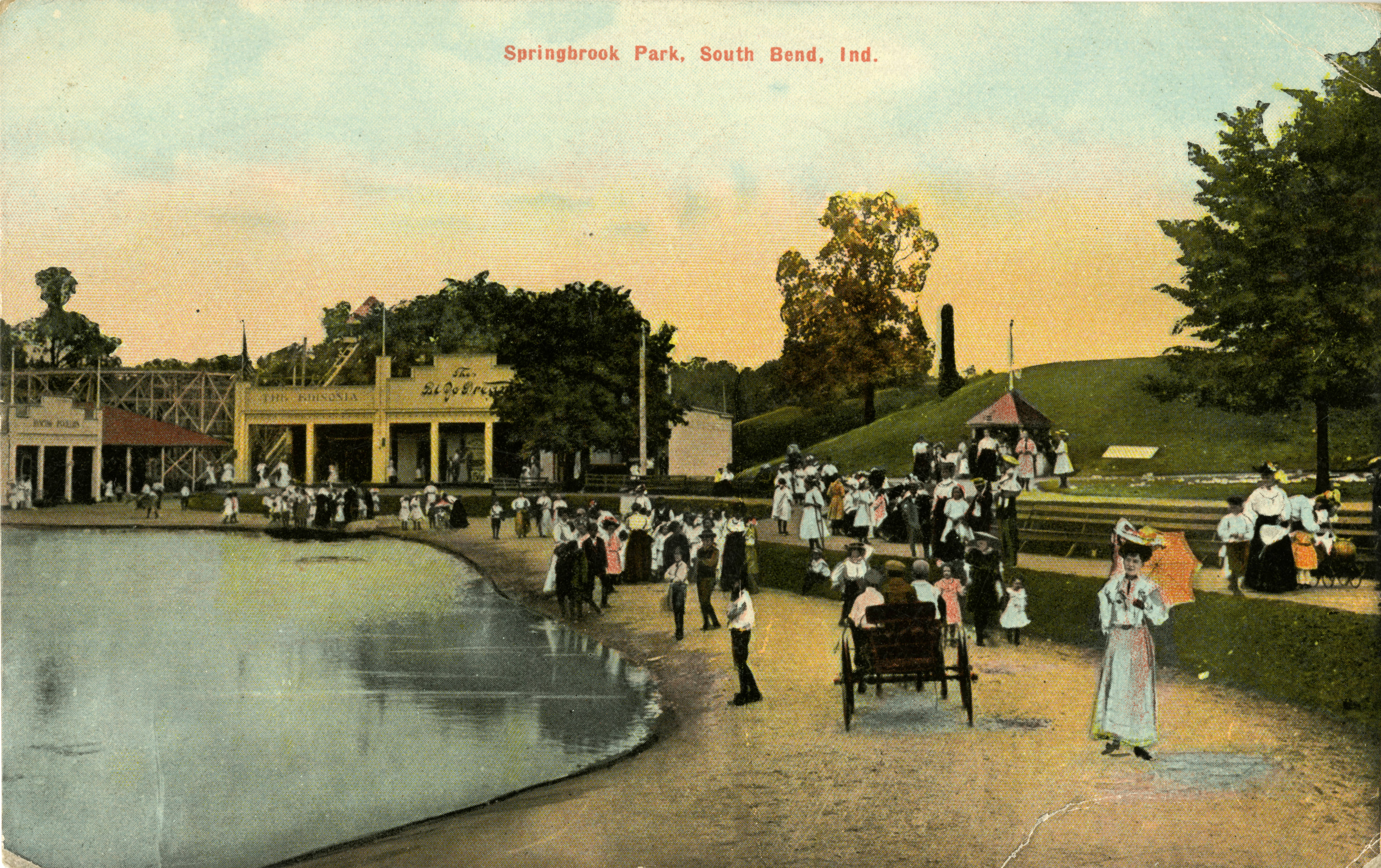
(1910) Springbrook Park, South Bend, Indiana

== Timeline ==
Year(s)	# Yrs.	Team	Level	League	Ballpark
1888	1	South Bend Green Stockings	Independent	Indiana State League	Greenstocking Park
1903	1	South Bend Green Stockings	Class B	Central League	Springbrook Park
1904–1909	6	South Bend Greens	Class B	Central League	Springbrook Park
1910	1	South Bend Bronchos	Class B	Central League	Springbrook Park
1911–1912	2	South Bend Benders	Class B	Central League	Springbrook Park
1911 (2)	1	South Bend Bux	Class B	Central League	Springbrook Park
1914	1	South Bend Benders	Class C	Southern Michigan League	Springbrook Park
1915	1	South Bend Factors	Class C	Southern Michigan League	Springbrook Park
1916–1917	2	South Bend Benders	Class B	Central League	Springbrook Park
1932	1	South Bend Twins	Class B	Central League	Springbrook Park
1988–present	-	South Bend Cubs	Class A	Midwest League	Four Winds Field at Coveleski Stadium

== Notable alumni ==
- Max Carey (1909–1910) Inducted Baseball Hall of Fame, 1961
- Cy Alberts (1908–1909)
- Goat Anderson (1903–1904, 1906)
- Walter Anderson (1916)
- Harry Arndt (1912, MGR)
- Charlie Babb (1906)
- Tom Bannon (1904)
- Al Bashang (1916–1917)
- Fred Beck (1917)
- Bill Bowman (1888)
- Abe Bowman (1916)
- Donie Bush (1907)
- Harry Camnitz (1911)
- Tom Cantwell (1911)
- Ed Cermak (1907)
- Frank Cross (1907)
- Gene Curtis (1907)
- Rex DeVogt (1916)
- Lee Dunham (1932)
- Jim Eschen (1915)
- Cecil Ferguson (1903–1904)
- Phil Geier (1911)
- Billy Hart (1888)
- Herbert Hill (1915–1916)
- Tex Hoffman (1917)
- Ducky Holmes (1910–1911)
- Bill Jackson (1917, MGR)
- Elmer Johnson (1907)
- George Kaiserling (1912)
- Speed Kelly (1907–1909, 1911)
- Ben Koehler (1908–1911, 1915; 1914, 1916, MGR)
- Harry LaRoss (1917)
- Tom Letcher (1905)
- Lou Lowdermilk (1914–1916)
- Len Madden (1912)
- Danny Mahoney (1912)
- Alex McCarthy (1910)
- Alex McColl (1916)
- Bing Miller (1917)
- Pete O'Brien (1911)
- Bob O'Farrell (1917)
- Charlie Pechous (1917)
- Hal Reilly (1916)
- Bill Richardson (1906)
- Frank Quinn (1904)
- Lou Schettler (1917)
- Ed Schorr (1914)
- Frank Shaughnessy (1906) Canadian Football Hall of Fame
- Hosea Siner (1907)
- Phil Slattery (1917)
- Ed Smith (1909–1910) (1914–1915, MGR)
- Jesse Tannehill (1912)
- Lee Tannehill (1916, MGR)
- Jack Taylor (1911)
- Jim Tray (1888)
- Harry Truby (1888)
- Jimmy Walsh (1909)
- Art Watson (1906, 1910)
- Harry Welchonce (1910)
- Charlie Wheatley (1917)
- Ed Wheeler (1910, MGR)
- Gene Wheeler (1907)
- Tom Williams (1906–1907)
- Frank Withrow (1916)
- Matt Zeiser (1916)
- South Bend Benders players
- South Bend Bronchos players
- South Bend Bux players
- South Bend Greens players
