= Al Mannassau =

American baseball player, manager, and umpire

- Born: Alfred S. Mannassau; 1866; Michigan, U.S.
- Died: October 13, 1933 (aged 66–67); Detroit, Michigan, U.S.
- Occupation: Umpire
- Years active: 1899 (NL), 1901 (AL), 1914 (FL)
- Employer(s): National League, American League, Federal League

Alfred S. Mannassau (1866 – October 13, 1933) was an American professional baseball umpire, manager and player. Mannassau umpired in the National League in 1899, working 92 games. Mannassau then umpired 96 American League games in 1901. He returned to baseball in 1914, and umpired in 109 Federal League games.

== Playing and managing career ==
Mannassau was a journeyman outfielder in several minor leagues from 1887 to 1895, including the Northern Michigan League, the Central Interstate League, the Pacific Northwest League, the Michigan State League, the Pacific Northwestern League, the California League, the Western League and the Virginia State League. He never played two full seasons in a row for the same team. In fact, during 1894 alone, Mannassau played for half of the eight teams in the Western League. Speed seems to have been a strength as a player, as he recorded 195 stolen bases in eight seasons. He had a brief stint as a manager in the Michigan State League in 1895 with the Lansing Senators.

== Umpiring career ==
In 1898, Sporting Life characterized Mannassau's umpiring work in the Western League as "grossly incompetent", saying that Mannassau had "feigned sickness and left the field" that day in response to persistent protests from fans. A few weeks later, the same publication described Mannassau as "improving".

In 1899, the National League was said to have purchased Mannassau from the Western League for $350. By midseason, J. Earle Wagner of the Washington team publicly criticized the umpiring of Mannassau and his partner. Wagner expressed a desire to return to the one-man umpiring system the following year.

In late May 1901, Mannassau was heckled heavily by Baltimore fans. The local newspaper heavily criticized Mannassau's "ignorance of the national game" and said that "President Johnson was a spectator of the game and something is likely to drop."

On August 8, 1901, Mannassau was punched in the jaw by Hugh Duffy of Milwaukee. Mannassau enraged Duffy, who would end up in the Hall of Fame, with a fair ball call that went against Milwaukee and resulted in the team's defeat.

In 1914, Mannassau was one of eight umpires hired to work in the Federal League.
