= Fred Buelow =

German-American baseball player (1876–1933)

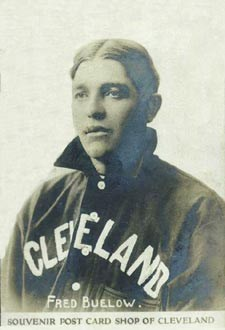
- Catcher
- Born: February 13, 1876; Berlin, German Empire
- Died: December 27, 1933 (aged 57); Detroit, Michigan, U.S.
- Batted: Right Threw: Right

MLB debut
- September 28, 1899, for the St. Louis Perfectos

Last MLB appearance
- July 13, 1907, for the St. Louis Browns

MLB statistics
- Batting average: .192
- Home runs: 6
- Runs batted in: 112
- Stats at Baseball Reference

Teams
- St. Louis Perfectos/Cardinals (1899–1900); Detroit Tigers (1901–1904); Cleveland Naps (1904–1906); St. Louis Browns (1907)

Frederick William Alexander Buelow (February 13, 1876 – December 27, 1933), sometimes referred to as Fritz Buelow, was a German-born baseball player. He played professional baseball as catcher for 15 years from 1895 to 1909, including nine years in Major League Baseball with the St. Louis Perfectos (1899), St. Louis Cardinals (1900), Detroit Tigers (1901–1904), Cleveland Naps (1904–1906), and St. Louis Browns (1907).

== Early years ==
Buelow was born in Berlin, Germany, in 1876. He moved to Detroit as a boy.

== Professional baseball ==
=== Minor leagues ===
Buelow began playing professional baseball in the minor leagues with the Columbus Statesman in 1895, the Brockton Shoemakers in 1896, and the Pawtucket Phenoms in 1897 and 1898. In 1898, he joined the Detroit Tigers of the Western League. He played for the Tigers in 1898 and 1899.

=== St. Louis Perfectos/Cardinals ===
In September 1899, he was traded by the Tigers to the St. Louis Perfectos of the National League. He made his major league debut with St. Louis on September 28, 1899. In seven games with the Perfectos at the end of the 1899 season, he compiled a .467 batting average. He remained with St. Louis in 1900 and appeared in 17 games, but his batting average dropped by 232 points to .235.

=== Detroit Tigers ===
He played for Detroit Tigers from 1901 to 1904, the team's first four years as a major league club. In May 1902, he was suspended for five days and fined $10 by American League president Ban Johnson on account of his "verbal abuse" of an umpire.

In four seasons with the Tigers, Buelow appeared in 241 games, 234 as a catcher, and compiled a .202 batting average and a .242 on-base percentage. Though a weak hitter, Buelow was reputed to be a solid defensive catcher. Former Detroit teammate and pitcher Wish Egan called Buelow "one of the most graceful catchers ever to play in the American League, "the best throwing catcher" he ever saw, and a player who had "rhythm in every move" and whose "only weakness was inability to hit." Detroit owner Frank Navin recalled: "Had he been able to hit he would have gone down in the records numbered with the best of them." Buelow led the American League's catchers with a .967 fielding percentage in 1901 and also tallied 213 putouts and 84 assists that season. However, he also led the league in 1902 with 20 errors by a catcher and in 1904 with 14 passed balls. He finished his major league career with 1,495 putouts, 474 assists, 83 errors, and 33 double plays turned.

=== Cleveland and St. Louis ===
In July 1904, Buelow signed a contract with the Cleveland Naps. He played for the Naps for three years, appeared in 151 games, and compiled batting averages of .176 in 1904, .172 in 1905, and .163 in 1906. Defensively, he led the American League's catchers in 1906 when he threw out 54.2% of the base runners attempting to steal a base.

In February 1907, Cleveland traded Buelow to the St. Louis Browns in exchange for Pete O'Brien. Buelow appeared in 26 games for the Browns, 25 as a catcher, and compiled a .147 batting average in 75 at bats. He appeared in his final major league game on July 13, 1907.

=== Minor leagues ===
Although his major league career ended in 1907, he played two more years in the minor leagues for the Minneapolis Millers in 1908 and for the Montreal Royals in 1909. After an injury ended his playing career, he served as the manager of the Bay City Cardinals club in the Southern Michigan League during the last half of the 1909 season.

== Later years ==
Buelow lived in Detroit after retiring from baseball. He was a gateman at the grandstand of Navin Field. He developed locomotor ataxia and suffered from that condition for several years. In December 1933, he was hospitalized at Grace Hospital in Detroit and died there after a stay of two weeks. He was 57 years old when he died. He was buried at Woodlawn Cemetery in Detroit.
