= Red Bowser =

American baseball player (1881–1943)

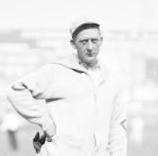
- Outfielder
- Born: September 20, 1881; Freeport, Pennsylvania, U.S.
- Died: May 22, 1943 (aged 61); Moundsville, West Virginia, U.S.
- Batted: Unknown Threw: Unknown

MLB debut
- September 13, 1910, for the Chicago White Sox

Last MLB appearance
- September 13, 1910, for the Chicago White Sox

MLB statistics
- Games played: 1
- At bats: 2
- Hits: 0
- Stats at Baseball Reference

Teams
- Chicago White Sox (1910)

James Harvey "Red" Bowser (September 20, 1881 – May 22, 1943) was an American outfielder in Major League Baseball for the Chicago White Sox.

== Biography ==
Bowser was born in Freeport, Pennsylvania, and started his professional baseball career in 1908. He played for the Flint Vehicles of the Southern Michigan League. After two seasons with batting averages of .272 and .284, Bowser was the star of the SML in 1910, when he batted .342, slugged .569, and hit 14 home runs. He led the league in all three categories and hit more homers than any two other players combined.

Bowser was then purchased by the American League's White Sox and joined the team late in the season. He played in one game for them, going 0 for 2 at the plate. The following season, he returned to the minor leagues. He batted just .246, and his organized baseball career ended in 1912.

Bowser died in Moundsville, West Virginia, at the age of 61.
