= Tecumseh Indians =

- 1906–1908; Tecumseh, Michigan

Minor league affiliations
- Class: Class D (1906–1908)
- League: Southern Michigan League (1906–1908)

Major league affiliations
- Team: None

Minor league titles
- League titles (1): 1907

Team data
- Name: Tecumseh Indians (1906–1908)
- Ballpark: Athletic Park (1906–1908)

The Tecumseh Indians were a minor league baseball team based in Tecumseh, Michigan. From 1906 to 1908, while hosting minor league home games at Athletic Park, Tecumseh teams played exclusively as members of the Class D level Southern Michigan League, winning the 1907 league championship.

Today, Tecumseh High School has adopted the "Indians" moniker.

== History ==
Tecumseh reportedly hosted an independent semi–professional team in 1905.

Minor league baseball began in Tecumseh, Michigan in 1906, when the Tecumseh "Indians" became charter members of the six–team Class D level Southern Michigan League, also called the "Southern Michigan Association". The Battle Creek Crickets, Jackson Convicts, Kalamazoo White Sox, Mount Clemens Bathers and Saginaw team joined Tecumseh as charter members of the league.

It was reported the Tecumseh minor league franchise was owned and founded by a group of local businessmen. The group was noted to have been Raynor Brewer, Faye and Raynor Anderson, J.H. Smith, Herbert Temple and Adolph Heesen.

The Tecumseh "Indians" moniker corresponds with the city being named after the Shawnee chief Tecumseh. Today, Tecumseh High School has adopted the "Indians" moniker.

Beginning league play on May 6, 1906, the Tecumseh Indians placed third in their first season of minor league play. The Indians ended the 1906 season with a record of 57–47 to place 3rd in the final Southern Michigan League standings. Managed by Horace Brewer, Tecumseh finished 12.5 games behind the first place Mount Pleasant Bathers (69–34). They were followed by second place Kalamazoo White Sox (63–41), the Tecumseh Indians (57–47), Jackson Convicts (52–52), Battle Creek Crickets (39–56) and Saginaw (34–60) in the final standings.

During the 1906 season, it was reported that Tecumseh player Bo Slear saved a child from drowning at the local Red Mill Pond and became a local hero. Slear returned as the team's player/manager in 1907 and later became the commissioner of baseball within the Michigan prison system.

The Tecumseh Indians won the 1907 Southern Michigan League championship, as the league expanded to eight teams. Tecumseh ended the season in first place with a record of 68–42, playing under player/manager Bo Slear, who reportedly played left field. The Indians finished 6.0 games ahead of the second place Kalamazoo White Sox (63–47) in the eight–team league. They were followed by the Battle Creek Crickets (63–48), Mount Clemens Bathers (52–51), Bay City (47–57), Lansing Senators (42–58), Flint Vehics (42–64) and Jackson Convicts (17–27) in the final standings. Tecumseh pitchers Harvey Teal and Tom Railing each won 21 games for the Indians, leading the Southern Michigan League, while teammate Fred Merkle led the league with 6 home runs.

After winning the championship, it was noted the there was a celebration and banquet for the team, held at the Lilley Hotel. Bo Slear reportedly worked at the hotel.

Player Fred Merkle was reportedly sold to the New York Giants for $2500.00 following the 1907 season. Merkle became a regular player for the 1908 Giants.

Beginning their final season, of minor league play, it was reported a celebration was held at the beginning of the 1908 season, raising the 1907 pennant at Athletic Park as the band played "Michigan, My Michigan." Tecumseh ended the Southern Michigan League season in fourth place with a 64–42 final record. Managed by Phenomenal Smith, the Indians finished 9.0 games behind the first place Saginaw Wa-was in the final standings. The Tecumseh franchise folded following the 1908 season, replaced by the Adrian Yeggs in the 1909 Southern Michigan League.

It was reported that local Blue laws preventing play on Sunday had a detrimental impact on revenues and that the small grandstand at Athletic Park was also a hindrance, as the franchise lost money.

Tecumseh, Michigan has not hosted another minor league team.

== The ballpark ==
The Tecumseh minor league teams were noted to have hosted home minor league games at Athletic Park. The ballpark was located at West Patterson Street and South Union Street in Tecumseh, Michigan. Today, the site still contains athletic fields.

== Timeline ==
Year(s)	# Yrs.	Team	Level	League	Ballpark
1906–1908	3	Tecumseh Indians	Class D	Southern Michigan League	Athletic Park

== Year–by–year records ==
Year	Record	Finish	Manager	Playoffs/notes
1906	57–47	3rd	Horace Brewer	No playoffs held
1907	68–42	1st	Bo Slear	League champions
1908	64–42	4th	Phenomenal Smith	No playoffs held

== Notable alumni ==
- Bunny Fabrique (1907)
- Gene Krapp (1906–1907)
- Fred Merkle (1906–1907)
- Lou Schiappacasse (1908)
- Phenomenal Smith (1908, MGR)
- Wib Smith (1906)
- Jock Somerlott (1907–1908)
- Dolly Stark (1906)

== See also ==
- Tecumseh (minor league baseball) players
