= Jesse Altenburg =

American baseball player (1893–1973)

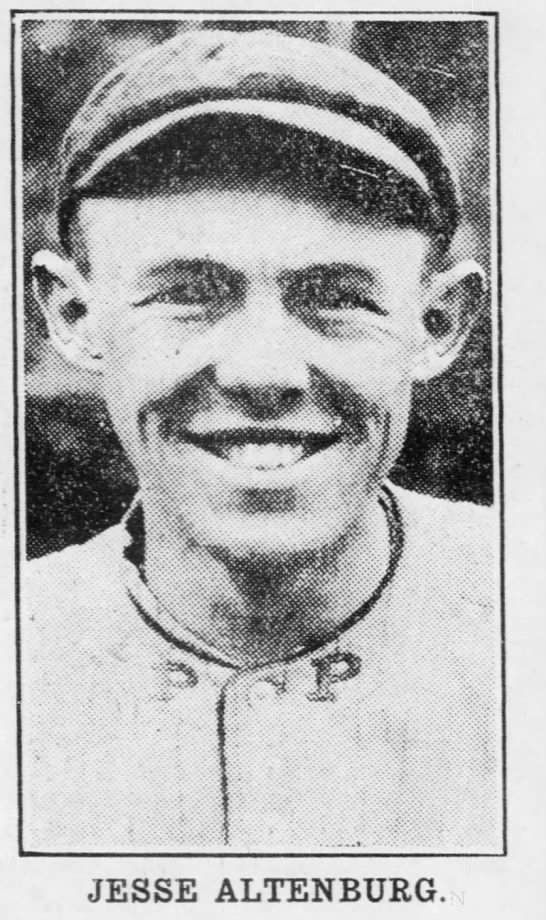
- Outfielder
- Born: January 2, 1893; Ashley, Michigan, U.S.
- Died: March 12, 1973 (aged 80); Lansing, Michigan, U.S.
- Batted: Left Threw: Right

MLB debut
- September 19, 1916, for the Pittsburgh Pirates

Last MLB appearance
- May 17, 1917, for the Pittsburgh Pirates

MLB statistics
- Batting average: .290
- Home runs: 0
- Runs batted in: 3
- Stats at Baseball Reference

Teams
- Pittsburgh Pirates (1916–1917)

Jesse Howard Altenburg (January 2, 1893 – March 12, 1973) was an American Major League Baseball player. He played with the Pittsburgh Pirates of the National League for two seasons,1916 and 1917. Altenburg played the outfield and batted left-handed and threw right-handed. He died in Lansing, Michigan.
