= Ducky Holmes (catcher) =

American baseball player (1883–1945)

- Catcher
- Born: July 8, 1883; Dayton, Ohio, U.S.
- Died: September 18, 1945 (aged 62); Dayton, Ohio, U.S.
- Batted: Right Threw: Right

MLB debut
- April 18, 1906, for the St. Louis Cardinals

Last MLB appearance
- April 29, 1906, for the St. Louis Cardinals

MLB statistics
- Batting average: .185
- Home runs: 0
- RBI: 2
- Stats at Baseball Reference

Teams
- St. Louis Cardinals (1906)

Howard Elbert "Ducky" Holmes (July 8, 1883 – September 18, 1945) was an American catcher in Major League Baseball. He played in 9 games for the 1906 St. Louis Cardinals.

After his playing career, he was a manager in the minor leagues for the Sioux City Packers of the Western League (1908), the Saginaw Ducks of the Southern Michigan League (1913–1915), and the Frankfort Old Taylors of the Ohio State League (1916). He also worked as an umpire, both in the National League (1921) and American League (1923–1924). Later, he managed the Dayton Ducks of the Middle Atlantic League (1932–1938, 1941–1942). After the Dayton Ducks folded at the end of the 1942 season, Holmes worked in a grocery store until his death.
