= Cecil Coombs =

American baseball player (1888–1975)

- Outfielder
- Born: March 18, 1888; Moweaqua, Illinois, U.S.
- Died: November 25, 1975 (aged 87); Fort Worth, Texas, U.S.
- Batted: Right Threw: Right

MLB debut
- August 7, 1914, for the Chicago White Sox

Last MLB appearance
- August 12, 1914, for the Chicago White Sox

MLB statistics
- Batting average: .174
- Home runs: 0
- RBI: 1
- Stats at Baseball Reference

Teams
- Chicago White Sox (1914)

Cecil Lysander Coombs (March 18, 1888 - November 25, 1975) was an American Major League Baseball outfielder who played for the Chicago White Sox in 1914. He went on to manage in the minor leagues following his playing career.

== Playing career ==
Coombs began his professional career in 1907, playing for the Shelbyville Queen Citys of the Eastern Illinois League, where he returned the next season. In 1909, Coombs played for both the Pekin Celestials and Decatur Commodores. In 112 games that year, he hit .240. He played for the Celestials, Bloomington Bloomers and Danville Speakers in 1910, hitting .274 in 65 games. In 1911, he played for the Speakers, hitting .253 in 115 games. 1911 was the first year in his professional career in which he collected more than 100 hits.

In 1912, Coombs split the season between the Speakers and Peoria Distillers, hitting only .220 in 96 games. His average improved to .308 in 1913, as he collected 139 hits in 122 games for the Adrian Champs. He had the best year of his career average-wise in 1914, collecting 182 hits in 129 games for the Bay City Beavers, for a .355 batting average. He was called up to the major leagues, and on August 7 he made his debut. In seven big league games, he hit .174 in 23 at-bats. On August 12, he played his final big league game.

Although his major league career was only that one cup of coffee, his professional career lasted for many more years. In 1915, he hit .268 in 138 games for the Birmingham Barons. He hit .264 in 96 games for them in 1916, and in 1917 he hit .255 in 155 games for them. Coombs split the 1918 season between four teams - the Barons, the Mobile Bears, the Little Rock Travelers and the Toledo Iron Men. He hit .241 in 84 games that year.

1919 was spent with the Houston Buffaloes and Galveston Pirates, hitting .264 in 153 games. In 1920, he hit .252 in 149 games for the Dallas Submarines. Coombs hit .293 with 30 home runs in 1921 with the Fort Worth Panthers, shattering his former career high of nine, which he set in 1914. He again played with the Panthers in 1922, hitting .311 with 10 home runs. 1923 was his final season as a player, and he hit .290 in 127 games split between the Panthers and the Wichita Falls Spudders.

Coombs played 15 years in the minor leagues, hitting .276 in 1,847 games. He had 1,808 hits.

== Managing career ==
Coombs was one of two managers for the Marshall Indians in 1925, the other being Johnnie Baggan. Similarly, he was one of two managers for the Alexandria Aces in 1934, the other being Art Phelan. In 1938, he was one of three managers for the Fort Worth Cats, the others being Homer Peel and Jackie Reid. In 1940, he managed the Hot Springs Bathers.
