= Ed Kusel =

American baseball player (1886-1948)

- Pitcher
- Born: February 15, 1886; Cleveland, Ohio, U.S.
- Died: October 20, 1948 (aged 62); Cleveland, Ohio, U.S.
- Batted: Unknown Threw: Right

MLB debut
- September 18, 1909, for the St. Louis Browns

Last MLB appearance
- October 1, 1909, for the St. Louis Browns

MLB statistics
- Win–loss record: 0–3
- Earned run average: 7.13
- Strikeouts: 2
- Stats at Baseball Reference

Teams
- St. Louis Browns (1909)

Edward Daniel Kusel (February 15, 1886 – October 20, 1948) was an American Major League Baseball pitcher who played for the St. Louis Browns in 1909.
