= Al Clauss =

American baseball player (1891–1952)

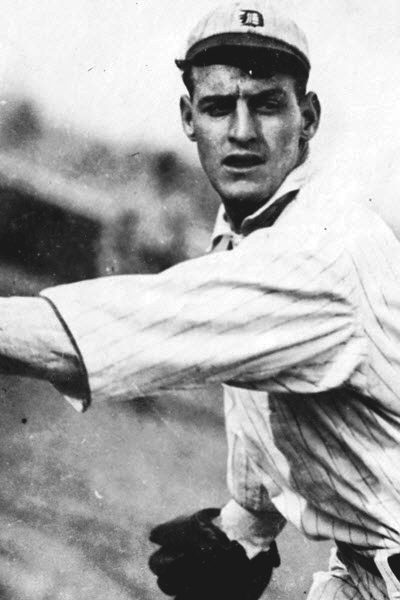
- Pitcher
- Born: June 23, 1891; New Haven, Connecticut, U.S.
- Died: September 13, 1952 (aged 61); New Haven, Connecticut, U.S.
- Batted: Right Threw: Left

MLB debut
- April 22, 1913, for the Detroit Tigers

Last MLB appearance
- June 17, 1913, for the Detroit Tigers

MLB statistics
- Win–loss record: 0–1
- Earned run average: 4.72
- Strikeouts: 1
- Stats at Baseball Reference

Teams
- Detroit Tigers (1913)

Albert Stanley "Lefty" Clauss (June 23, 1891 – September 13, 1952) was an American Major League Baseball pitcher. Clauss played for the Detroit Tigers in 1913. In 5 career games, he had a 0–1 record, with a 4.73 ERA. He batted right and threw left-handed.

Clauss was born and died in New Haven, Connecticut.
