= Ed Warner =

American baseball player (1889–1954)

- Pitcher
- Born: June 20, 1889; Fitchburg, Massachusetts, U.S.
- Died: February 5, 1954 (aged 64); New York, New York, U.S.
- Batted: Right Threw: Left

MLB debut
- July 2, 1912, for the Pittsburgh Pirates

Last MLB appearance
- August 26, 1912, for the Pittsburgh Pirates

MLB statistics
- Win–loss record: 1–1
- Earned run average: 3.60
- Strikeouts: 13
- Stats at Baseball Reference

Teams
- Pittsburgh Pirates (1912)

Edward Emory Warner (June 20, 1889 – February 5, 1954) was an American Major League Baseball pitcher who played in 1912 with the Pittsburgh Pirates. He batted right-handed and threw left-handed.

He was born in Fitchburg, Massachusetts and died in New York City.
