= Hal Schwenk =

American baseball player (1890-1955)

- Pitcher
- Born: August 23, 1890; Schuylkill, Pennsylvania, U.S.
- Died: September 3, 1955 (aged 65); Kansas City, Missouri, U.S.
- Batted: Left Threw: Left

MLB debut
- September 4, 1913, for the St. Louis Browns

Last MLB appearance
- September 4, 1913, for the St. Louis Browns

MLB statistics
- Win–loss record: 1-0
- Earned run average: 3.27
- Strikeouts: 3
- Stats at Baseball Reference

Teams
- St. Louis Browns (1913)

Harold Edward Schwenk (August 23, 1890 – September 4, 1955) was an American Major League Baseball pitcher who played in one game for the St. Louis Browns on September 4, 1913.
