= Ben Koehler =

Baseball player (1877-1961)

- Outfielder
- Born: January 26, 1877; Schondorf, Germany
- Died: May 21, 1961 (aged 84); South Bend, Indiana, U.S.
- Batted: Right Threw: Right

MLB debut
- April 23, 1905, for the St. Louis Browns

Last MLB appearance
- October 7, 1906, for the St. Louis Browns

MLB statistics
- Batting average: .233
- Home runs: 2
- Runs batted in: 62
- Stats at Baseball Reference

Teams
- St. Louis Browns (1905–1906)

Ben Koehler (January 26, 1877, Schondorf, Germany – May 21, 1961, South Bend, Indiana) was a Major League Baseball player for the St. Louis Browns in 1905–1906. He was primarily an outfielder, though he played a few games as a first or second baseman.

Koehler played in a total of 208 games and had a lifetime batting average of .233, accumulating 168 hits, 2 home runs, and 62 RBI.

As a center fielder, Koehler helped turn 11 double plays in 1905, among the highest for that fielding position in a single season.
