= Dick Niehaus =

American baseball player (1892–1957)

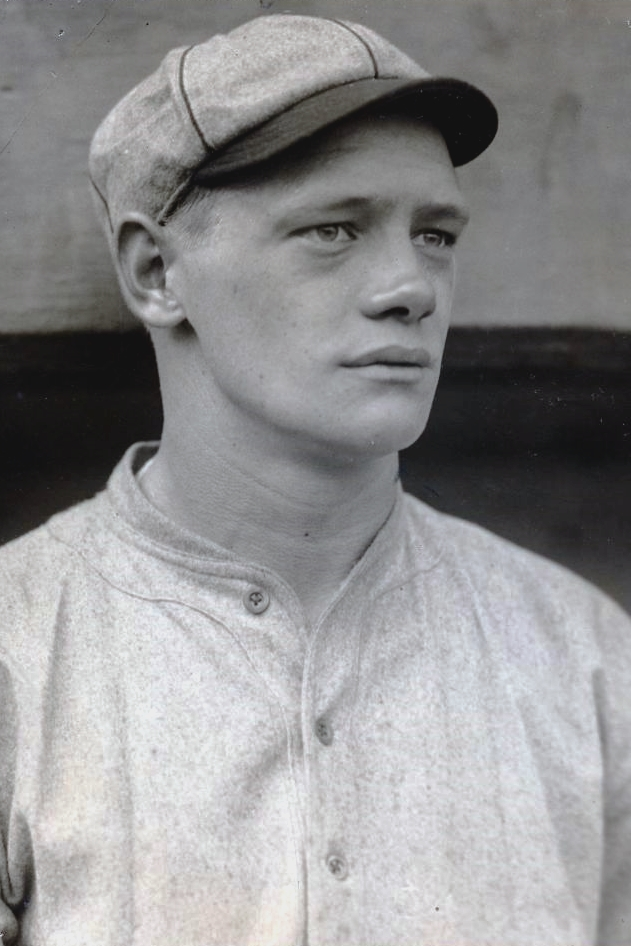
- Pitcher
- Born: October 24, 1892; Covington, Kentucky, U.S.
- Died: March 12, 1957 (aged 64); Atlanta, Georgia, U.S.
- Batted: Left Threw: Left

MLB debut
- September 9, 1913, for the St. Louis Cardinals

Last MLB appearance
- August 1, 1920, for the Cleveland Indians

MLB statistics
- Win–loss record: 4–5
- Earned run average: 3.77
- Strikeouts: 43
- Stats at Baseball Reference

Teams
- St. Louis Cardinals (1913–1915); Cleveland Indians (1920)

Richard J. Niehaus (October 24, 1892 – March 12, 1957) was an American Major League Baseball pitcher who played for four seasons. He played for the St. Louis Cardinals from 1913 to 1915 and the Cleveland Indians in 1920.
