= Buck Hopkins =

American baseball player (1883–1929)

- Center fielder
- Born: January 3, 1883; Grafton, Virginia, U.S.
- Died: October 2, 1929 (aged 46); Phoebus, Virginia, U.S.
- Batted: Left Threw: Left

MLB debut
- July 22, 1907, for the St. Louis Cardinals

Last MLB appearance
- September 24, 1907, for the St. Louis Cardinals

MLB statistics
- Batting average: .136
- Home runs: 0
- Runs batted in: 3
- Stats at Baseball Reference

Teams
- St. Louis Cardinals (1907)

John Winton "Buck" Hopkins (January 3, 1883 – October 2, 1929) was an American Major League Baseball outfielder. Nicknamed "Sis", he played fifteen games for the St. Louis Cardinals in 1907. Hopkins' minor league baseball career spanned fifteen seasons, between 1906 and 1920.
