= Wese Callahan =

American baseball player (1888–1953)

- Shortstop
- Born: July 3, 1888; Lyons, Indiana, U.S.
- Died: September 13, 1953 (aged 65); Dayton, Ohio, U.S.
- Batted: Right Threw: Right

MLB debut
- September 7, 1913, for the St. Louis Cardinals

Last MLB appearance
- September 21, 1913, for the St. Louis Cardinals

MLB statistics
- Batting average: .286
- Home runs: 0
- Runs batted in: 1
- Stats at Baseball Reference

Teams
- St. Louis Cardinals (1913)

Wese LeRoy Callahan (July 3, 1888 – September 13, 1953) was an American Major League Baseball shortstop who played for the St. Louis Cardinals in 1913.
