= Joe Kutina =

American baseball player (1885-1945)

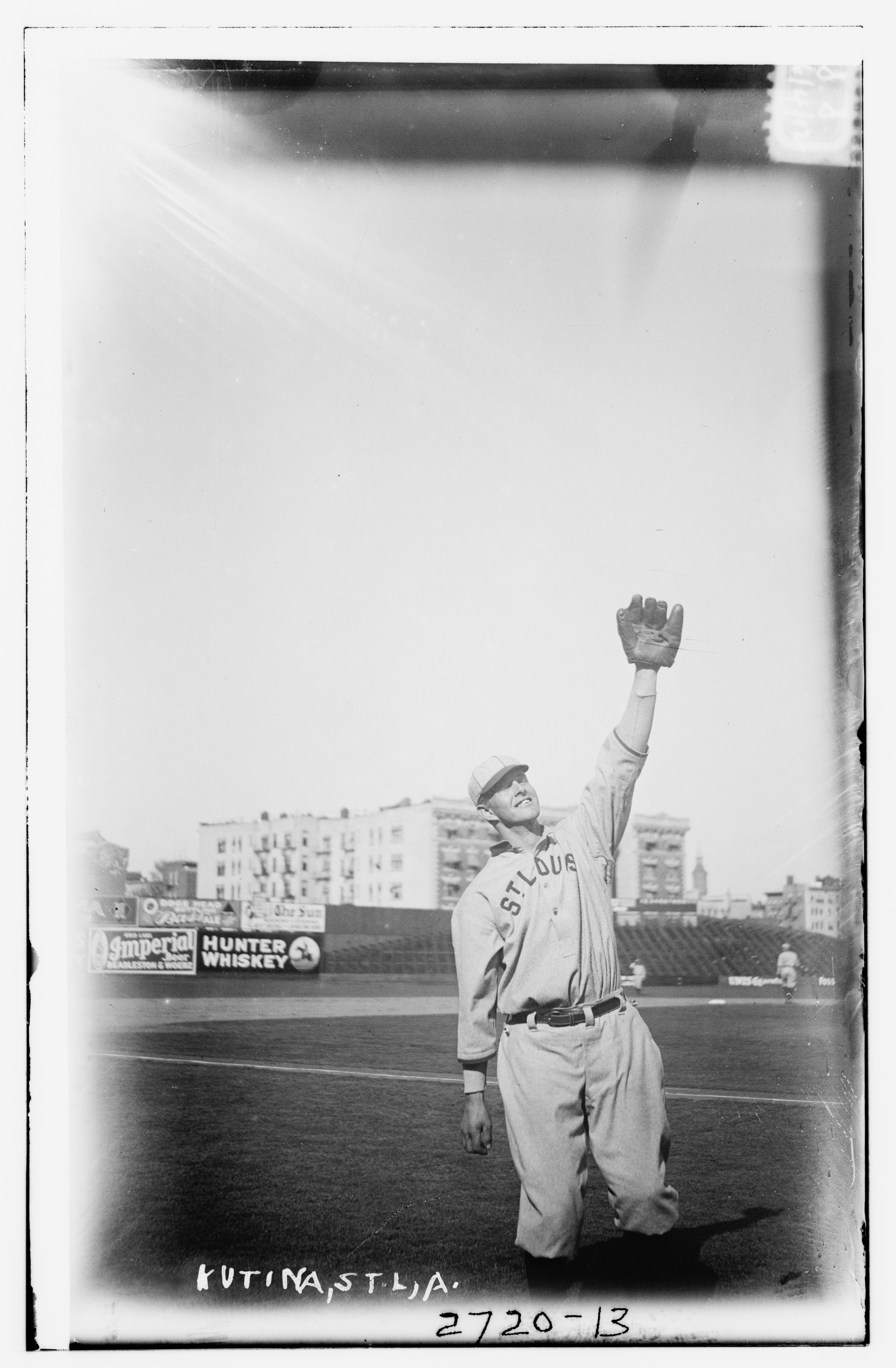
- First baseman
- Born: January 16, 1885; Chicago, Illinois, U.S.
- Died: April 13, 1945 (aged 60); Chicago, Illinois, U.S.
- Batted: Right Threw: Right

MLB debut
- September 6, 1911, for the St. Louis Browns

Last MLB appearance
- September 13, 1911, for the St. Louis Browns

MLB statistics
- Batting average: .222
- Home runs: 4
- Runs batted in: 33
- Stats at Baseball Reference

Teams
- St. Louis Browns (1911–1912)

Joseph Peter Kutina (January 16, 1885 – April 13, 1945) was an American Major League Baseball first baseman who played in 1911 and 1912 with the St. Louis Browns.
