= Hosea Siner =

American baseball player (1885–1948)

- Infielder
- Born: March 20, 1885; Shelburn, Indiana, U.S.
- Died: June 10, 1948 (aged 63); Sullivan, Indiana, U.S.
- Batted: Right Threw: Right

MLB debut
- July 28, 1909, for the Boston Doves

Last MLB appearance
- August 23, 1909, for the Boston Doves

MLB statistics
- Batting average: .130
- Home runs: 0
- Runs batted in: 1
- Stats at Baseball Reference

Former teams
- Monmouth Browns (minor league) (1908–1910)

Teams
- Boston Doves (1909)

Hosea John Siner (March 20, 1885 – June 10, 1948) was an American Major League Baseball player. He played one season with the Boston Doves in 1909. He played for the minor league Monmouth Browns (Illinois-Missouri League) from 1908 through 1910.
