= Bay City Beavers =

Defunct baseball team in Bay City, Michigan, United States

The Bay City Beavers were a Southern Michigan League baseball team based in Bay City, Michigan, United States that existed from 1913 to 1915. Future major leaguer Joe Harris played for them in 1913 and 1914. Cecil Coombs played for them in 1914 as well. No known major league baseball players played for them in 1915.
