= Adrian Yeggs =

Baseball team in Adrian, Michigan, U.S.

The Adrian Yeggs were a Southern Michigan League baseball team based in Adrian, Michigan, United States that played from 1909 to 1914 as a whole and 1909 to 1911 under the Yeggs nickname.

== History ==
According to the book Baseball Team Names, 1869-2012, they were named after safe-cracker James Yeggs, one of the most well-known inmates at a prison located in Adrian.

Carl Vandagrift, Frank Gilhooley and Elmer Smith played for them.

In 1912, they were renamed to the Adrian Lions Major League Baseball players that played for them include Emil Huhn, Cowboy Jones, Elmer Smith and Bun Troy. They became the Adrian Champs in 1913. They finished first in the league with a 78-47 record and were managed by Dan Jenkins. The team was probably named after the Lion motor car manufactured in Adrian. The factory burned down during 1912 and the company ceased operations, thus the change of name in 1913.

In 1913, they were named the Adrian Champs. Major League Baseball players that played for them include Cecil Coombs, Paul Smith, Johnny Mitchell, Emil Huhn, Cowboy Jones and Bun Troy. Prior to being the Adrian Champs, they were the Adrian Lions. They became the Adrian Fencevilles in 1914.

In 1914, their final season, they were named the Adrian Fencevilles. They were the last team to ever play in Adrian, Michigan.

== Timeline ==
Year(s)	# Yrs.	Team	Level	League
1895	1	Adrian Demons/Adrian Reformers	Class B	Michigan State League
1909–1910	2	Adrian Yeggs	Class D	Southern Michigan League
1911	1	Adrian Yeggs	Class C	Southern Michigan League
1912	1	Adrian Lions	Class C	Southern Michigan League
1913	1	Adrian Champs	Class D	Southern Michigan League
1914	1	Adrian Fencevilles	Class C	Southern Michigan League
