= Flint Vehicles =

The Flint Vehicles were a professional baseball team in Flint, Michigan from 1921 to 1926. They were a part of the Michigan–Ontario League and were preceded in the league by the Flint Halligens in 1919 and 1920. In 1921, future Pittsburgh Steelers and Pittsburgh Penguins founder and owner Art Rooney played for the Flint Vehicles as an outfielder.
