= Holland Wooden Shoes =

- 1910–1911; Holland, Michigan

Minor league affiliations
- Class: Class D (1910–1911)
- League: Western Michigan League (1910); Michigan State League (1911)

Major league affiliations
- Team: None

Minor league titles
- League titles (0): None

Team data
- Name: Holland Wooden Shoes (1910–1911)
- Ballpark: 19th Street Grounds (1910–1911)

The Holland Wooden Shoes were a minor league baseball team based in Holland, Michigan. In 1910 and 1911, the Wooden Shoes played as members of the Class D level Western Michigan League and its successor, the 1911 Michigan State League. The Wooden Shoes hosted home games at the 19th Street Grounds.

== History ==
Minor league baseball began in Holland, Michigan in 1910, when the Holland "Wooden Shoes" became charter members of the four–team Class D level Western Michigan League. Holland joined the Cadillac Chiefs, Muskegon Speed Boys and Traverse City Resorters teams in beginning league play on May 28, 1910.

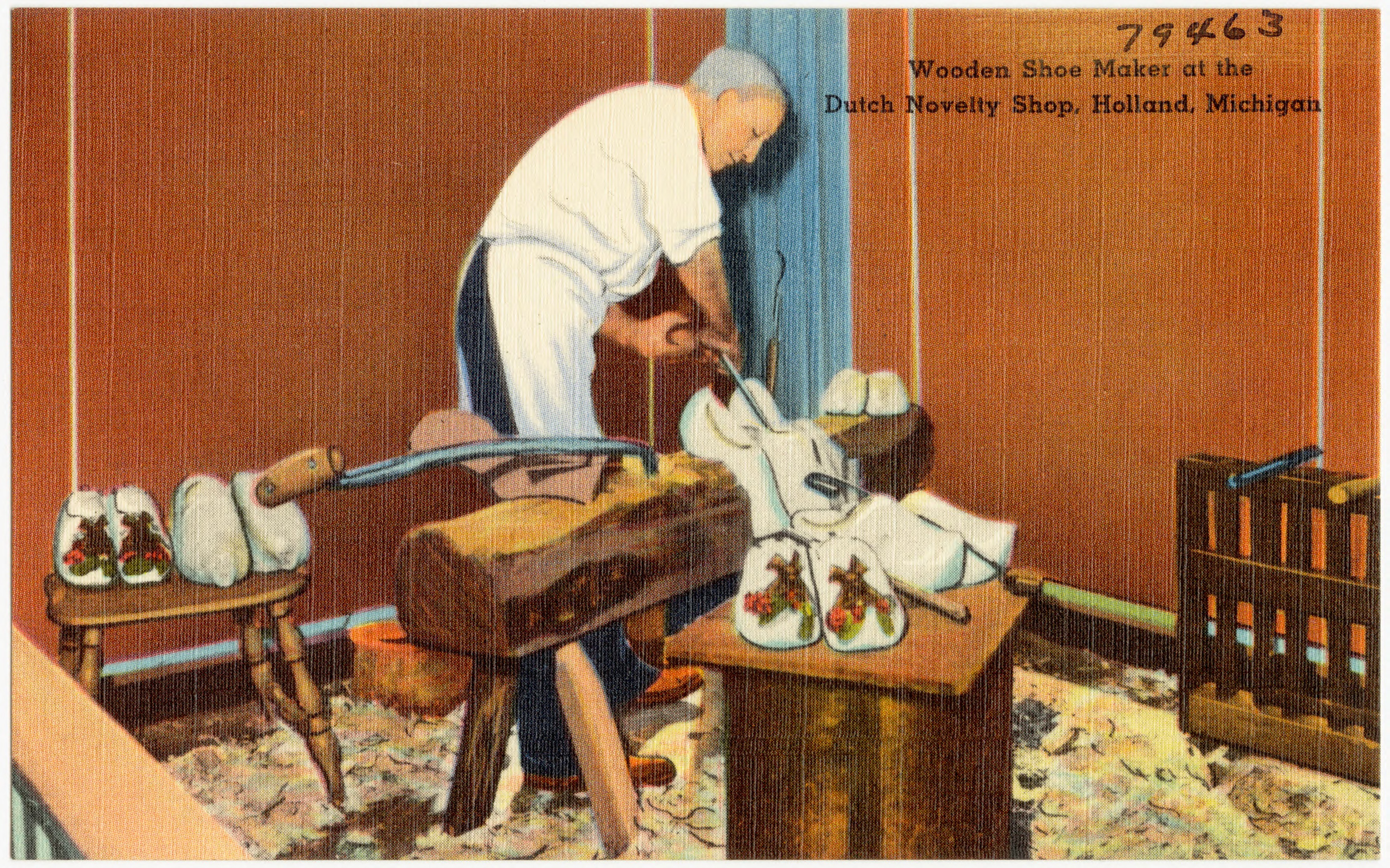
(1930) Postcard - Wooden shoe maker. Dutch Novelty Shop, Holland, Michigan.

The Holland, Michigan use of the "Wooden Shoes" moniker corresponds to namesake Holland culture. In the country of the Netherlands (often incorrectly referred to as Holland), wooden shoes or clogs are prevalent in history and culture.

In their first season of play, the 1910 Holland Wooden Shoes finished last in the Western Michigan League final standings. Beginning play on May 28, 1910, the Wooden Shoes ended the 1940 regular season with a record of 40–56, playing under managers Charles Doyle, Emerson Dickerson and Clyde McNutt. Holland finished in fourth place as Cadillac won the championship with a 53–42 record, finishing 13.5 games ahead of the Wooden Shoes. In the final standings, Cadillac was followed by second place Traverse City Resorters (50–45), third place Muskegon (48–48) and fourth place Holland (40–56).

The Holland Wooden Shoes played their final season in 1911. Holland joined a new league, as the Western Michigan League expanded and became the reformed six–team Class D level Michigan State League. The Manistee Colts and Boyne City Boosters franchises joined the four returning 1910 Western Michigan League teams in beginning league play on May 23, 1911. Holland ended the 1911 season with a record of 48–71 and placed fifth in the final standings. Managed by Clyde McNutt, Ted Penfold, Ed McDonough and W. Schaefer, the Chiefs finished 26.0 games behind the first place Manistee Colts.

The Holland franchise was replaced by the Ludington Mariners in the 1912 Michigan State League. Holland, Michigan has not hosted another minor league team.

Today, the Holland baseball Little League hosts an annual "Wooden Shoe Tournament."

== The ballpark ==
The Holland Wooden Shoes teams hosted minor league home games at 19th Street Grounds. The ballpark was also known as Athletic Park in the era. Today, the ballpark site is still in use as a public park, known as Rosa Parks Green. The park is located at 84 East 19th Street in Holland, Michigan.

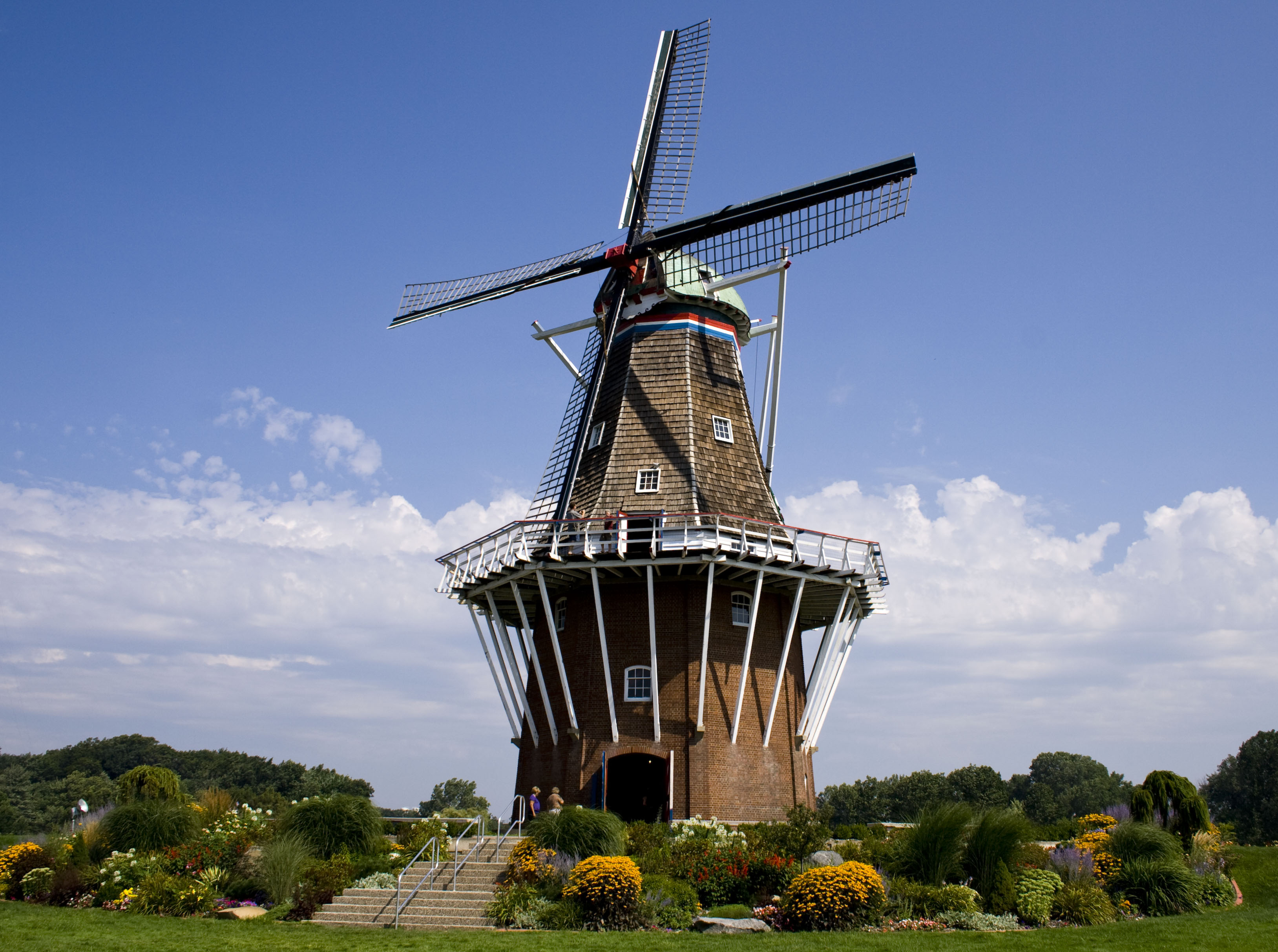
(2009) De Zwaan Dutch Mill. National Register of Historic Places. Holland, Michigan

== Timeline ==
Year(s)	# Yrs.	Team	Level	League	Ballpark
1910	1	Holland Wooden Shoes	Class D	Western Michigan League	19th Street Grounds
1911	1	Holland Wooden Shoes	Class D	Michigan State League	19th Street Grounds

== Year–by–year records ==
Year	Record	Finish	Manager	Playoffs/notes
1910	40–56	4th	Charles Doyle / Emerson Dickerson / Clyde McNutt	No playoffs held
1911	48–71	5th	Clyde McNutt / Ted Penfold; Ed McDonough / W. Schaefer	No playoffs held

== Notable alumni ==
- Ed Hendricks (1910)
- Bill Lauterborn (1911)
- Doc Lavan (1910)

== See also ==
- Holland Wooden Shoes players
