= Boyne City Boosters =

- 1911–1914; Boyne City, Michigan

Minor league affiliations
- Class: Class D (1911–1914)
- League: Michigan State League (1911–1914)

Major league affiliations
- Team: None

Minor league titles
- League titles (0): None

Team data
- Name: Boyne City Boosters (1911–1914)
- Ballpark: Glenwood Beach (1911); Maple Park (1911–1914)

The Boyne City Boosters were a minor league baseball team based in Boyne City, Michigan. From 1911 to 1914, the Boosters teams played exclusively as members of the Class D level Michigan State League, hosting home minor league games at Maple Park.

== History ==
Minor league baseball began in Boyne City, Michigan in 1911, when the Boyne City "Boosters" became members of the Western Michigan League, which expanded by adding two teams and changed names to become the six–team Class D level Michigan State League. The new Boyne City Boosters and Manistee Colts franchises joined the four returning 1910 teams in beginning league play on May 23, 1911. The returning Cadillac Chiefs, Holland Wooden Shoes, Muskegon Speed Boys and Traverse City Resorters teams became the other charter member league teams in 1911.

In their first season of minor league play, the Boyne City Boosters finished last the Michigan State League final standings. On June 6, 1911, in his first appearance with Boyne City, pitcher Al Clauss threw a seven–hit shutout, striking out six, in a 3–0 win at home against the Traverse City Resorters. The Boosters ended the 1911 season with a record of 24–92 and placed sixth in the final standings. Managed by Peter Partlow, who was replaced on June 14, Jack Ryan, who was replaced on June 22 and Lou Criger, the Boosters finished 48.5 games behind the first place Manistee Colts as the league held no playoffs.

The 1912 Boyne City Boosters placed fourth in the six–team Michigan State League standings. The Boosters ended the season with a record of 50–69. Playing under manager Bo Slear, Boyne City finished 33.5 games behind the first place and champion Manistee Champs in the six–team league final standings and did not qualify for the playoffs, that were ultimately cancelled by weather.

Continuing Michigan State League play, the 1913 Boyne City Boosters placed fourth in the final standings. Playing under manager Grover Gillen, the Boosters ended the season with a record of 57–63. Boyne City finished 16.0 games behind the first place and repeat champion Manistee Champs in the six–team league. No playoffs were held in 1913.

In their final season of play, the Boyne City Boosters folded before the end of the 1914 the Michigan State League season. The league began the season as a six–team league. The Boyne City franchise became a road team on July 8, 1914. On September 1, 1914, the Boyne City Boosters and Traverse City Resorters franchises folded simultaneously. The Boosters ended their final season with a record of 48–51, playing under returning manager Grover Gillen. The Muskegon Speeders finished in first place in the final Michigan State League standings.

The Michigan State League folded after the 1914 season with the beginning of World War I. When the league resumed play in 1926, Boyne City did not field a franchise in the reformed league. Boyne City, Michigan has not hosted another minor league team.

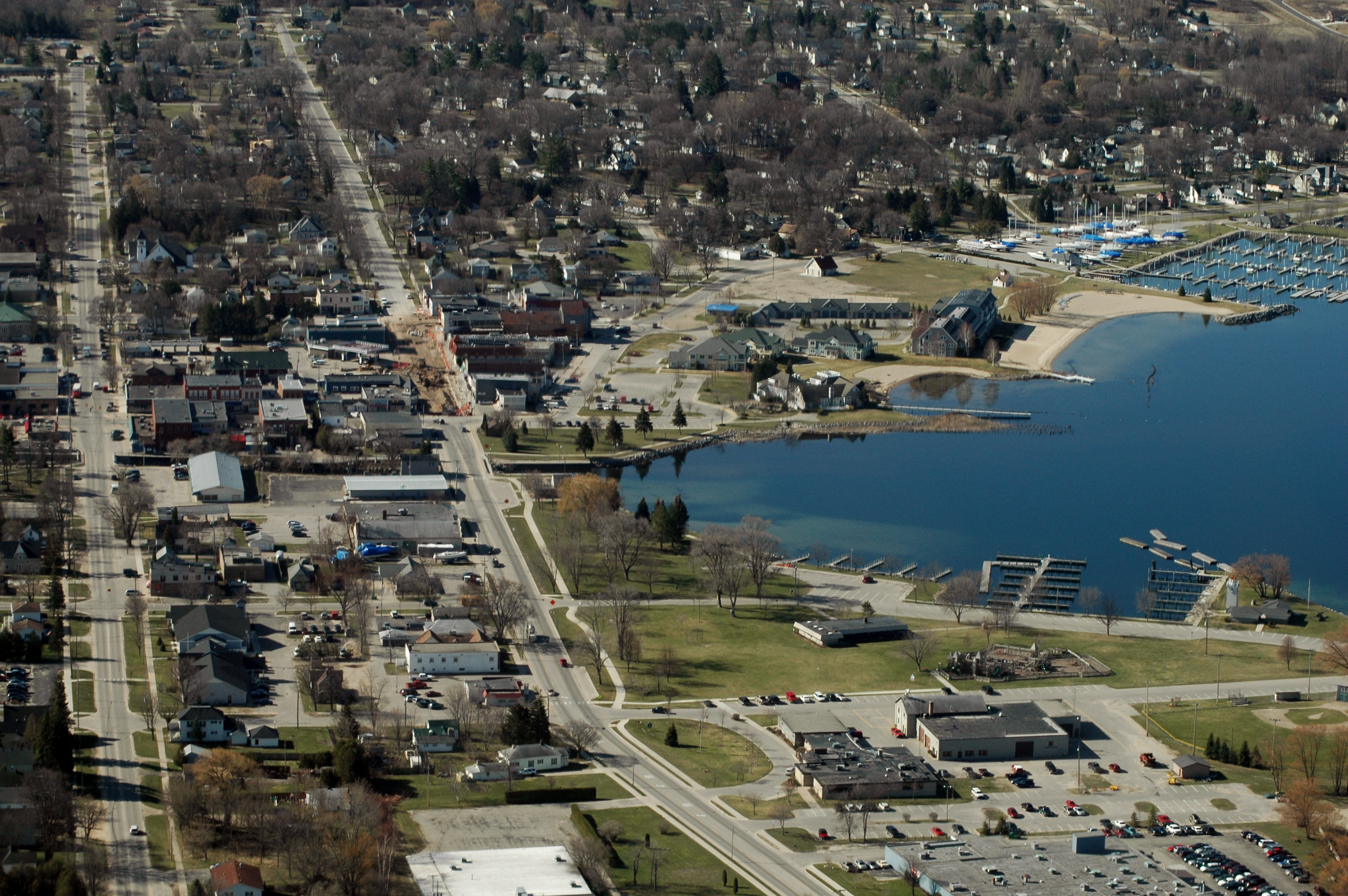
(2007) Boyne City, Michigan.

== The ballparks ==
The Boyne City Boosters played home minor league teams games at Maple Park.

In 1911, the Boosters initially played home games at Glenwood Beach until Maple Park ballpark construction was completed.

== Timeline ==
Year(s)	# Yrs.	Team	Level	League	Ballaprks
1911	1	Boyne City Boosters	Class D	Michigan State League	Glenwood Beach/Maple Park
1912-1914	3	Boyne City Boosters	Class D	Michigan State League	Maple Park

== Year–by–year records ==
Year	Record	Finish	Manager	Playoffs/notes
1911	24–92	6th	Peter Partlow / Jack Ryan / Lou Criger	No playoffs held
1912	50–69	4th	Bo Slear	Did not qualify
1913	57–63	4th	Grover Gillen	No playoffs held
1914	48–51	NA	Grover Gillen	Became a road team July 8 Team folded September 1

== Notable alumni ==
- Al Clauss (1911)
- Lou Criger (1911, MGR)
- Al Tesch (1914)
- Archie Yelle (1911)

== See also ==
- Boyne City Boosters players
