= St. Joseph Autos =

- 1940–1941; St. Joseph, Michigan

Minor league affiliations
- Class: Class C (1940–1941)
- League: Michigan State League (1940–1941)

Major league affiliations
- Team: St. Louis Browns (1940–1941)

Minor league titles
- League titles (0): None
- Wild card berths (1): 1940

Team data
- Name: St. Joseph Autos (1940–1941)
- Ballpark: Edgewater Park (1940–1941)

The St. Joseph Autos were a minor league baseball team based in St. Joseph, Michigan. In 1940 and 1941, the Autos played exclusively as members of the Class C level Michigan State League, playing as a minor league affiliate of the St. Louis Browns in both seasons.

St. Joseph hosted home minor league games at Edgewater Park in St. Joseph.

== History ==
Minor league baseball began in St. Joseph, Michigan in 1940. The St. Joseph "Autos" became members of the reformed six–team Class C level Michigan State League, playing as a minor league affiliate of the St Louis Browns. The Autos joined the Flint Gems, Grand Rapids Dodgers, Lansing Lancers, Muskegon Reds and Saginaw Athletics in beginning league play on May 14, 1940.

The St. Joseph use of the "Autos" moniker corresponds to local industry. The Auto Specialties Manufacturing Company (AUSCO) was located in St. Joseph, Michigan and hosted the team at Edgewater Park, located on the company owned grounds.

In their first season of play, the 1940 St. Joseph Autos placed third in the Michigan State League standings and advanced to the finals. Beginning play on May 14, 1941, the Autos ended the 1940 regular season with a record of 52–51, playing under managers Conrad Fisher and Elmer Kirchoff. St. Joseph finished 12.5 games behind the first place Flint Gems in the final regular season standings. In the first round of the playoffs, St. Joseph defeated the Flint Gems 3 games to 2 to advance to the Finals. The Autos were matched against the Saginaw Athletics in the Finals, but the series was cancelled due to weather.

The St. Joseph Autos played their final season in 1941. St. Joseph placed second in the 1941 the Michigan State League final standings. The Autos ended the 1941 season with a 64–50 record as Henry McIntosh returned as manager. St. Joseph finished 9.0 games behind the first place and champion Flint Indians in the six–team league. No playoffs were held in 1941.

The Michigan State League permanently folded after the 1941 season. St. Joseph, Michigan has not hosted another minor league team.

After the demise of the minor league franchise, the St. Joseph "Auscos" continued play as a semi–professional team through 1957. On July 15, 1957, the Auscos hosted an exhibition against the Chicago White Sox, with Baseball Hall of Fame members manager Al Lopez and players Minnie Minoso, Nellie Fox and Luis Aparicio appearing in the game. The White Sox won the contest by the score of 4–1.

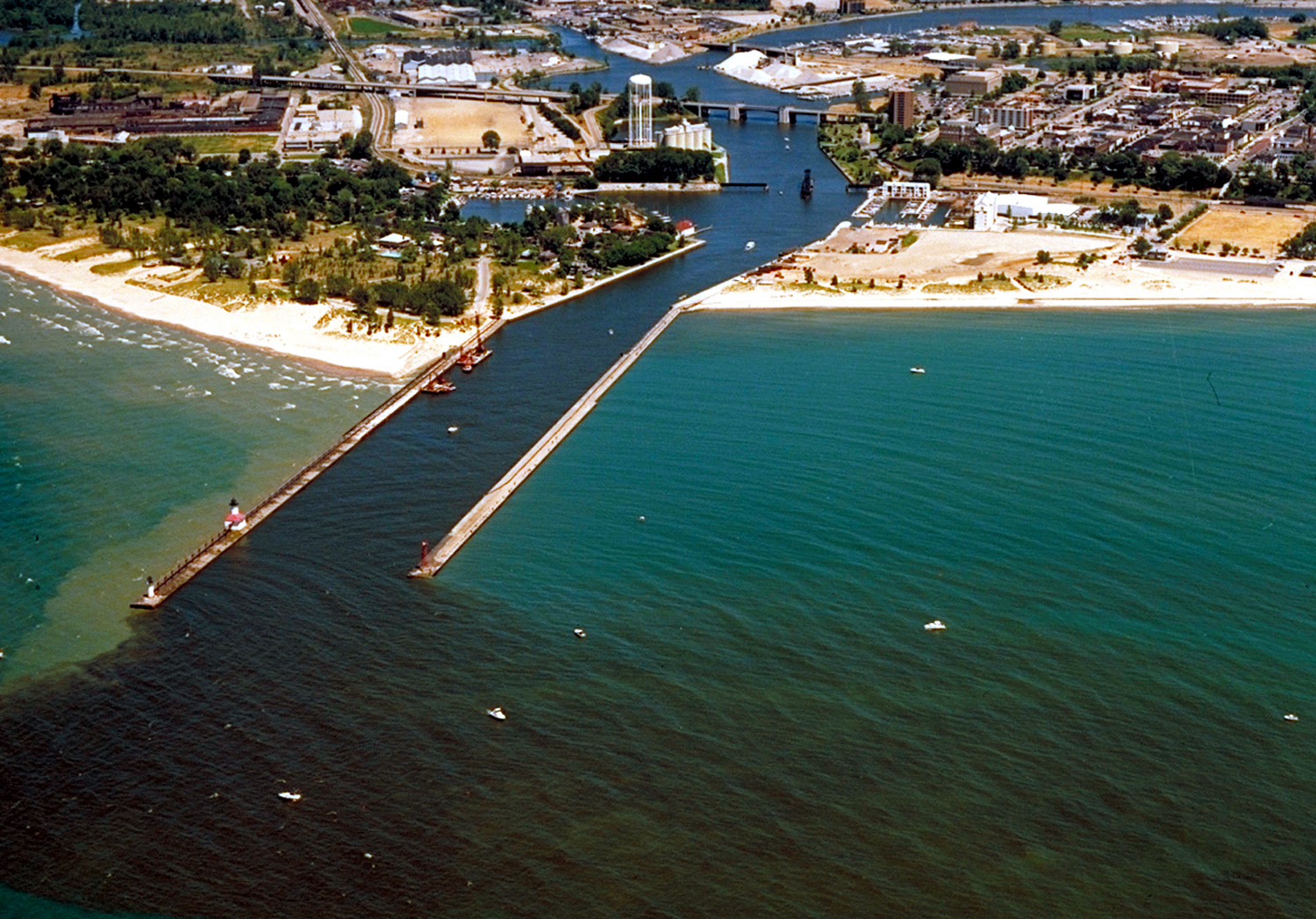
(2000) Aerial View. St. Joseph, Michigan. The Edgewater Park ballpark location was in the left portion of the photo, near the bridge.

== The ballpark ==
The St. Joseph Autos minor league teams played home games at Edgewater Park. The field had dimensions of (Left, Center, Right): 300–350–300. The ballpark cost $30,000 to construct and had a covered grandstand with bleachers. The site no longer contains a ballpark. Today, the ballpark site remains the location of the Auto Specialties Manufacturing Company (AUSCO). The AUSCO facility is located at 643 Graves Street in St. Joseph, Michigan.

== Timeline ==
Year(s)	# Yrs.	Team	Level	League	Affiliate	Ballpark
1940–1941	2	St. Joseph Autos	Class C	Michigan State League	St. Louis Browns	Edgewater Park

== Year–by–year records ==
Year	Record	Finish	Manager	Playoffs/notes
1940	52–51	3rd	Conrad Fisher / Elmer Kirchoff	League finals cancelled
1941	64–50	2nd	Elmer Kirchoff	No playoffs held

== Notable alumni ==
- Al LaMacchia (1941)
- Babe Martin (1940)
- Jim Russell (1940)
- Marlin Stuart (1941)

== See also ==
- St. Joseph Autos players
