= Doggie Miller =

American baseball player (1864–1909)

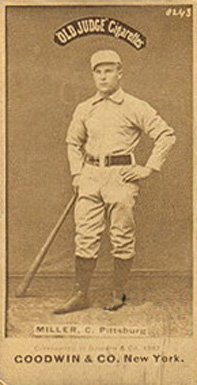
- Catcher / Manager
- Born: August 15, 1864; Brooklyn, New York, U.S.
- Died: April 6, 1909 (aged 44); Ridgewood, Queens, New York, U.S.
- Batted: Right Threw: Right

MLB debut
- May 1, 1884, for the Pittsburgh Alleghenys

Last MLB appearance
- September 25, 1896, for the Louisville Colonels

MLB statistics
- Batting average: .267
- Home runs: 33
- Runs batted in: 567
- Stats at Baseball Reference

Teams
- As player: Pittsburgh Alleghenys / Pirates (1884–1893); St. Louis Browns (1894–1895); Louisville Colonels (1896); As manager: St. Louis Browns (1894)

George Frederick "Foghorn" or "Calliope" Miller (August 15, 1864 – April 6, 1909) was an American professional baseball catcher. He played in Major League Baseball (MLB) from 1884 through 1896 for the Pittsburgh Alleghenys / Pirates, St. Louis Browns, and Louisville Colonels. In 1894, he was a player-manager for the Browns.

Born in Brooklyn, Miller entered minor league baseball at the age of 18 and advanced to the major leagues the next season. Primarily a catcher, Miller shunned the protective equipment that was becoming standard for that position, and that made catching too physically demanding to do every day. As a result, on days when his team was resting him as a catcher, they used him almost anywhere else on the field. He became the first major league player to appear in 20 or more games at all eight non-pitching positions.

After his last major league appearance in 1896, he was a minor league player, manager and part-owner at various points through 1903. Not much is known about the few years that Miller spent in retirement from professional baseball. He died in Brooklyn of kidney disease in 1909.

== Early career ==
In 1883, an 18-year-old Miller debuted in professional baseball with the Harrisburg squad in the Interstate Association. A year later, he made the major leagues with the Pittsburgh Alleghenys of the American Association (AA). He spent ten seasons in Pittsburgh, staying with the team in 1887 when the team joined the National League (NL), ultimately becoming known as the Pirates.

In the AA, players and coaches often kept up lively chatter during the games, but Miller was even more energetic than most of his peers. When Pittsburgh came to the NL, their opponents were often taken aback by the 5'6" catcher's steady stream of booming exclamations. His nickname, "Doggie", alluded to his hobby of dog breeding, but Miller was sometimes also known as "Calliope" or "Foghorn" – references to his gruff voice and boisterous manner – especially early in his career. He became known for some characteristic mannerisms, including what sportswriter Hugh Fullerton described as "a funny little ballet girl kick" just before he swung the bat.

Miller could play almost any position on the field, but he was most comfortable as a catcher. However, overhand pitching had been introduced in professional baseball around the time that Miller's career started, and most catchers had started to wear protective equipment such as a chest protector. Miller's refusal to don the chest protector made that position more physically demanding, limiting his playing time at that position. While he could not catch every day, Miller's defense at any other position was often subpar. "[Miller] covered about as much ground as a woodshed, and threw to first like a drunkard with a cork leg," writer Len Washburn once said of a game in which Miller played shortstop for Pittsburgh. Still, he became the first major league player to spend 20 or more games at each non-pitching position.

== Move to the National League ==
When the upstart Players' League emerged before the 1890 season, nearly all of Pittsburgh's roster moved over to the new league or to other teams; only Miller and Billy Sunday remained on the NL team, so the roster was filled by minor league or semipro replacement players and the team finished 23–113 that year. With Pittsburgh that year, Miller played in an extremely rare tripleheader; as of 2018, it is one of three times in baseball history that three games were played by the same teams on the same day. The hapless Pittsburgh team lost all three games to the Brooklyn squad; with Pittsburgh trailing by one run in the first game, Miller hit a triple and was thrown out trying to stretch the triple into a home run.

After the Players' League's lone season, players like Jake Beckley returned to the NL and Pittsburgh achieved a winning record within two seasons. In 1892, Miller's batting average was an unremarkable .254, but he was the hardest player in the league to strike out, batting 44.5 times for every time that he struck out. By 1893, he was struggling to hit well enough to stay in the major leagues. After 41 games that season, Miller had a .182 batting average when he was demoted to the minor leagues. Playing for the Harrisburg Hustlers of the Pennsylvania State League, Miller rebounded well, hitting .364 in 39 games.

In 1894, looking at Miller's experience as a team captain and his improved performance once in the minor leagues the year before, St. Louis Browns owner Chris von der Ahe hired Miller as a player-manager, adding him to the carousel of men who managed the team for a season or less in the 1890s. Von der Ahe, notorious for meddling in the field management of his teams, promised Miller that he would not interfere. Miller promised von der Ahe that he would avoid drinking. "Neither man was true to his word," researcher J. Thomas Hetrick wrote in a biography of von der Ahe. During one game that year, von der Ahe sent the team's official scorer down to the field to replace a hungover Miller as manager for the day.

Miller did implement a stark change for the Browns shortly after taking the job. He thought that rifle shooting would help with eye–hand coordination, so he took his players to a shooting range each morning. On defense, Miller began catching much less frequently; he played more often at third base and at a few other positions. When he was not on the field, Miller performed in the Wild West show that von der Ahe had bought from Buck Taylor. His team finished 56–76–1. Miller came back as a player in 1895, but von der Ahe hired Al Buckenberger to step in as manager.

== Later life ==
In 1896, Miller spent the season with the Louisville Colonels, playing in 98 games that year. They released him after that season, and he signed with the Minneapolis Millers of the Western League for 1897. Early that year, newspaper reports held that Cap Anson was interested in signing him to a major league contract. However, Miller played a full season for the Millers, hitting .338 and stealing 45 bases, and he never returned to the major leagues. His career statistics are mostly unremarkable, except that as of 2018 he ranks 12th all-time in career at-bat-to-strikeout ratio (33.7).

Miller finished his playing career with a two-year stint in Fort Wayne, Indiana with the Fort Wayne Railroaders. There, after he was ejected from a 1900 game, he accosted the umpire after the game and bloodied the umpire's face. Miller was arrested and was fined $100 by the team, and a newspaper report speculated that he might not be allowed to play professionally anymore. He was allowed to continue playing with the Fort Wayne team through the 1901 season.

In 1902, Miller was co-owner and player-manager of the Saginaw White Sox (Saginaw, Michigan) of the Michigan State League during some unusual events that led to the team's relocation to another city in the middle of the season. Miller's co-owner, C. F. Baker of Fort Wayne, Indiana, failed to pay salaries, league fees and other bills. Miller was said to have been an innocent victim of Baker's attempt to pocket extra money. In July 1902, Miller had the team transferred to W. W. Todd of the drug company known as Waldron & Todd. Todd lived in Jackson, Michigan, and the team relocated there with its roster unaffected and with Miller staying on as manager.

Miller managed and played for the Dayton Veterans of the new Central League in 1903. This appears to have been his last appearance in professional baseball. Relatively little is known about his life after that, though there is a reference to Miller pursuing umpiring on some level. He died of kidney disease in his Brooklyn home in 1909. He was buried at Lutheran All Faiths Cemetery in Brooklyn.

== See also ==
- List of Major League Baseball career stolen bases leaders
