= Hub Hart =

American baseball player (1878–1960)

Biographical details
- Born: February 2, 1878; Everett, Massachusetts, U.S.
- Died: October 10, 1960 (aged 82); Fort Wayne, Indiana, U.S.

Playing career

Football
- 1899–1900: Boston College
- 1901–1903: Georgetown

Baseball
- 1903–1905: Georgetown

Coaching career (HC unless noted)

Football
- Boston College: 1910

Head coaching record
- Overall: 0–4–2

Accomplishments and honors

Awards
- All-Southern (1901)

Baseball career
- Catcher
- Batted: Left Threw: Right

MLB debut
- July 16, 1905, for the Chicago White Sox

Last MLB appearance
- October 5, 1907, for the Chicago White Sox

MLB statistics
- Batting average: .213
- Home runs: 0
- Runs batted in: 11
- Stats at Baseball Reference

Teams
- Chicago White Sox (1905–1907)

James Henry "Hub" Hart (February 2, 1878 – October 10, 1960) was an American Major League Baseball catcher who played for the Chicago White Sox from 1905 to 1907. Listed at 5 ft 11 in (1.80 m), 170 lbs, Hart batted left-handed and threw right-handed. Hart played college football as halfback at Boston College and Georgetown University.

== Early life ==
Hart was born in Everett, Massachusetts on February 2, 1878. He played football at Everett High School and began his collegiate career at Boston College, where he played with fellow Georgetown back Joseph Reilly.

== Football ==
In 1901, Hart enrolled at Georgetown to study dentistry. On November 16, 1901, he solidified himself in Georgetown football history by scoring all three of his team's touchdowns in a 17–16 win over the University of Virginia. He was selected All-Southern in 1901. Hart was named team captain in 1903. That season, he had a 99-yard run from scrimmage against Maryland; this is still a school record. His nickname, "Hub", originated from his central position on most of the team's plays. He was elected to the Georgetown Hall of Fame.

In 1910, Hart served as the head football coach at Boston College in 1910, compiling a record of 0–4–2.

=== Head coaching record ===
Year	Team	Overall	Conference	Standing	Bowl/playoffs
Boston College (Independent) (1910)
1910	Boston College	0–4–2			
Boston College:		0–4–2			
Total:		0–4–2			

== Baseball ==
Hart also played on Georgetown's baseball team and was considered the best college catcher in the country. He signed with the Chicago White Sox in June 1905 and appeared in 11 games his rookie year. He was the team's backup catcher in 1906 and 1907 behind fellow Georgetown School of Dentistry alum Doc White. During the offseason, Hart worked as a dentist in Melrose, Massachusetts. From 1908 to 1910, he played for the Montgomery Senators/Climbers of the Southern Association. He received a tryout for the Cleveland Indians in 1911, but did not make the team. He instead played for the Utica Utes of the New York–Pennsylvania League. He split the 1912 season with the Sacramento Sacts of the Pacific Coast League and the Manistee Champs of the Michigan State League.

After his playing career ended, Hart settled in Fort Wayne, Indiana, where he managed a semipro team known as the Fort Wayne Cubs or Hart's Cubs and owned a billiard hall. In 1934, he was president of the Fort Wayne Chiefs of the Central League.

Hart died on October 10, 1960, in Fort Wayne. He was buried at Greenlawn Memorial Park in Fort Wayne.

=== MLB batting statistics ===
GP	AB	R	H	2B	3B	HR	RBI	SB	BB	SO	BA	OBP	SLG
57	127	10	27	0	0	0	11	1	10	19	.213	.275	.220
