= Jim Schelle =

American baseball player (1917-1990)

- Pitcher
- Born: April 13, 1917; Baltimore, Maryland, U.S.
- Died: May 4, 1990 (aged 73); Weymouth, Massachusetts, U.S.
- Batted: Right Threw: Right

MLB debut
- July 23, 1939, for the Philadelphia Athletics

Last MLB appearance
- July 23, 1939, for the Philadelphia Athletics

MLB statistics
- Win–loss record: 0–0
- Earned run average: ∞
- Strikeouts: 0
- Stats at Baseball Reference

Teams
- Philadelphia Athletics (1939)

Gerard Anthony "Jim" Schelle (April 13, 1917 – May 4, 1990) was an American professional baseball player who played in one game for the Philadelphia Athletics during the 1939 season.

Schelle was born in Baltimore, Maryland and attended Villanova University. He made his professional baseball debut in 1939 with the Federalsburg A's of the Eastern Shore League.

On July 23, Schelle made his one and only major league appearance with the Athletics. In a game against the Detroit Tigers, he came into the game to start the fourth inning in relief of Bob Joyce, with the A's already down 9-1. He proceeded to hit Rudy York with a pitch. He then gave up a single to Pinky Higgins and walked the following three Tiger batters, allowing all five batters he faced to reach base. At that point, Schelle was removed from the game (which ended with the Tigers winning 16-3) and was replaced by Nels Potter. Schelle's final totals were three earned runs allowed without retiring a batter, giving him an earned run average of infinity.

After the 1939 season, Schelle played two more seasons in minor league baseball with the Saginaw Athletics and Flint Gems. After serving in the U.S. Army during World War II, Schelle never returned to professional baseball. He died in Weymouth, Massachusetts at the age of 73.
