= Ernie Krueger =

American baseball player (1890–1976)

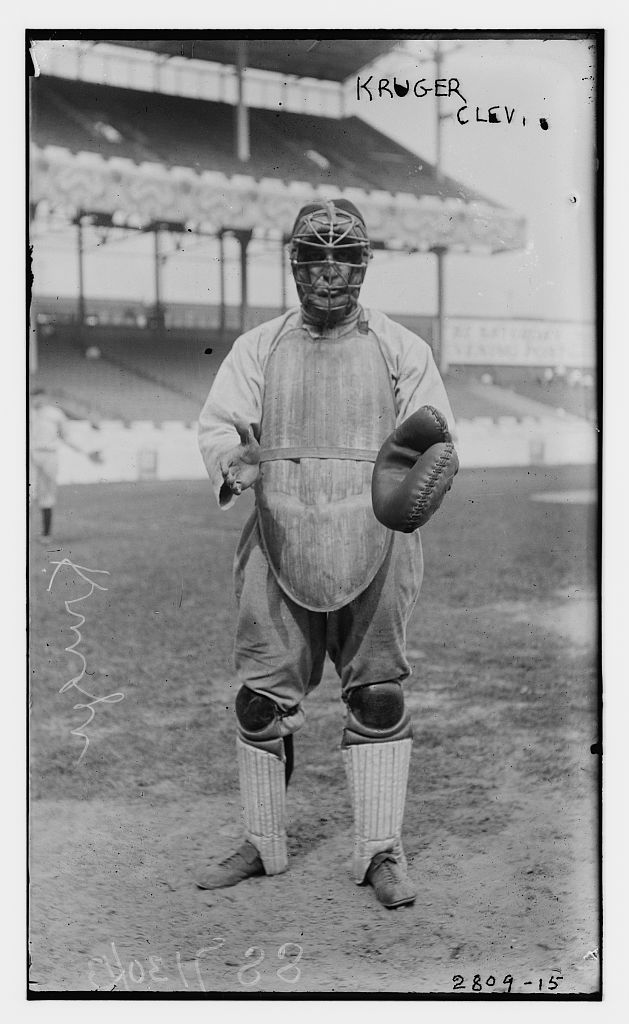
- Catcher
- Born: December 27, 1890; Chicago, Illinois, U.S.
- Died: April 22, 1976 (aged 85); Waukegan, Illinois, U.S.
- Batted: Right Threw: Right

MLB debut
- August 4, 1913, for the Cleveland Naps

Last MLB appearance
- October 4, 1925, for the Cincinnati Reds

MLB statistics
- Batting average: .263
- Home runs: 11
- Runs batted in: 93
- Stats at Baseball Reference

Teams
- Cleveland Naps (1913); New York Yankees (1915); New York Giants (1917); Brooklyn Robins (1917–1921); Cincinnati Reds (1925)

Ernest George Krueger (December 27, 1890 – April 22, 1976) born in Chicago, was an American catcher for the Cleveland Naps (1913), New York Yankees (1915), New York Giants (1917), Brooklyn Robins (1917–1921) and Cincinnati Reds (1925).

== Biography ==
Ernie Krueger graduated from Lake Forest College. During his playing career at Lake Forest College Krueger resided in the famed 80 Washington Circle, which to this day houses some of LFC's greatest athletes. He made his professional debut with the Class D Traverse City Resorters of the Michigan State League in 1912. He would advance to Major League Baseball in 1913 and would go on to help the Giants win the 1917 National League Pennant and the Robins win the 1920 NL Pennant.

In eight seasons, Krueger played in 318 Games and had 836 At Bats, 87 Runs, 220 Hits, 33 Doubles, 14 Triples, 11 Home Runs, 93 RBI, 12 Stolen Bases, 64 Walks, .263 Batting Average, .319 On-base percentage, .376 Slugging Percentage, 314 Total Bases and 8 Sacrifice Hits.

On May 1, 1920, Ernie Krueger was the catcher for the Brooklyn Robins in the "longest game in baseball history"–27 innings. Asked how he managed such a feat, he indicated that at the time there was no night baseball, so the game was played on two consecutive days. In later years, when baseball became a passion in Japan there were several Ernie Krueger fan clubs formed that honored his playing days. He was also one of the founders of the Old Timers Baseball Association and was often asked to throw out the first ball of the season at major league games in Chicago.

He died in Waukegan, Illinois at the age of 85. He was survived by his wife, Ruth Talcott Krueger, and one niece, Judith Talcott Rogers. A street was named in his honor in Waukegan, Illinois.

== Sources ==
- Career statistics from Baseball Reference · Baseball Reference (Minors) · Retrosheet · Baseball Almanac
