= Cadillac Chiefs =

- 1910–1914; Cadillac, Michigan

Minor league affiliations
- Class: Class D (1910–1914)
- League: Western Michigan League (1910); Michigan State League (1911–1914)

Major league affiliations
- Team: None

Minor league titles
- League titles (1): 1910

Team data
- Name: Cadillac Chiefs (1910–1914)
- Ballpark: Recreation Park (1910–1914)

The Cadillac Chiefs were a minor league baseball team based in Cadillac, Michigan. In 1910, Chiefs became as charter members of the Class D level Western Michigan League, winning the 1910 league championship. Cadillac then continued play, with the Chiefs becoming members of the Class D Michigan State League from 1911 to 1914. The Chiefs hosted home minor league games at Recreation Park.

== History ==
Minor league baseball began in Cadillac, Michigan in 1910. The Cadillac "Chiefs" became charter members of the reformed four–team Class D level Western Michigan League. The Chiefs joined the Holland Wooden Shoes, Muskegon Speed Boys and Traverse City Resorters in beginning league play on May 28, 1910.

The Cadillac use of the "Chiefs" moniker corresponds to regional history. Chief Pontiac, of the Cadillac Indians, led battles against settlers in Michigan.

In their first season of play, the 1910 Cadillac Chiefs won the West Michigan League championship. Beginning play on May 28, 1910, the Chiefs ended the 1940 regular season with a record of 53–42, playing under manager Calvin Wenger. Cadillac finished the season 3.0 games ahead of the second place Traverse City Resorters (50–45), followed by third place Muskegon (48–48) and fourth place Holland (40–56) to win the championship. Martin Kubiak of Cadillac won the Western Michigan League batting title, hitting .378, while teammate Harry Gerloski led the league with 18 wins.

The Cadillac Chiefs continued play in 1911 as the Western Michigan League expanded and became the reformed six–team Class D level Michigan State League. The Manistee Colts and Boyne City Boosters franchises joined the four returning 1910 teams in beginning league play on May 23, 1911. Cadillac ended the 1911 season with a record of 73–45 and placed second in the final standings, tied with the Muskegon Reds, who had an identical record. Managed by Calvin Wenger, the Chiefs finished 0.5 game behind the first place Manistee Colts.

The 1912 Cadillac Chiefs finished last in the six–team Michigan State League standings. The Chiefs finished in sixth place with a record of 35–82. Playing under returning manager Calvin Wenger and Thomas Railing, Cadillac finished 47.5 games behind the first place and champion Manistee Champs in the six–team league final standings. Al Platte of Cadillac won the Michigan State League batting title, hitting .367, also leading the league with 42 stolen bases.

Continuing Michigan State League play, the 1913 Cadillac Chiefs placed fifth in the final standings. Playing under manager Homer Warner, the Chiefs ended the season with a record of 53–66. Cadillac finished 19.5 games behind the first place and repeat champion Manistee Champs in the six–team league. No playoffs were held in 1913.

In their final season of play, the Cadillac Chiefs placed third in the 1914 the Michigan State League final standings. The league began the season as a six–team league. On September 1, 1914, the Boyne City Boosters and Traverse City Resorters franchises folded. Chiefs ended the season with a record of 67–51, playing under manager Jay Parker. Cadillac finished 5.5 games behind the first place and champion Muskegon Speeders in the final league standings.

The Michigan State League folded after the 1914 season with the beginning of World War I. When the league resumed play in 1926, Cadillac did not field a franchise. Cadillac, Michigan has not hosted another minor league team.

== The ballpark ==
The Cadillac Chiefs hosted minor league teams home games at Recreation Park. The ballpark was noted to have been located at the Fair Grounds off Haring Street, as a 1914 map shows a baseball diamond inside the racecourse at the Northern Michigan Fair Association Fair Grounds. Today, the Northern District Fair Grounds are located at 1320 North Mitchell Street, Cadillac, Michigan.

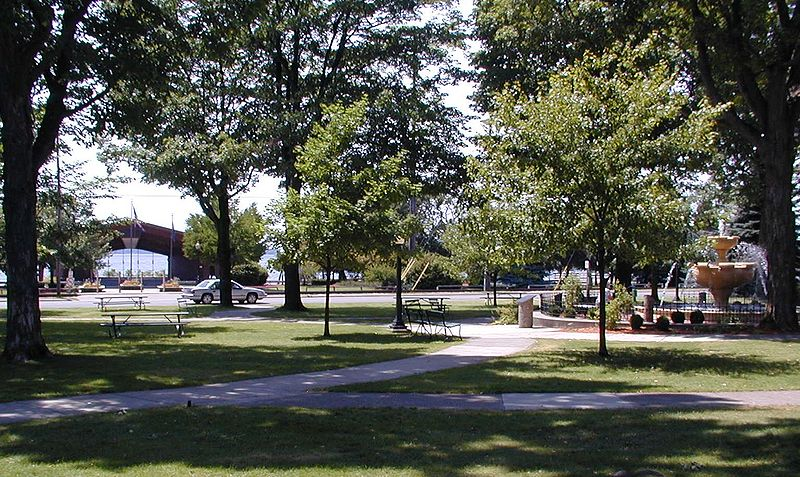
(2006) Cadillac City Park. Cadillac, Michigan.

== Timeline ==
Year(s)	# Yrs.	Team	Level	League
1910	1	Cadillac Chiefs	Class D	Western Michigan League
1911–1914	4	Cadillac Chiefs	Class D	Michigan State League

== Year–by–year records ==
Year	Record	Finish	Manager	Playoffs/notes
1910	53–42	1st	Calvin Wenger	No playoffs held
1911	73–45	2nd	Calvin Wenger	No playoffs held
1912	35–82	6th	Calvin Wenger / Thomas Railing	Did not qualify
1913	53–66	5th	Homer Warner	No playoffs held
1914	67–51	3rd	Jay Parker	No playoffs held

== Notable alumni ==
- Milo Allison (1913)
- Jay Parker (1914, MGR)
- Ken Penner (1914)
- Al Platte (1910–1912)

== See also ==
- Cadillac Chiefs players
