= Charlotte Giants =

- 1926; Charlotte, Michigan

Minor league affiliations
- Class: Class B (1926)
- League: Michigan State League (1926)

Major league affiliations
- Team: None

Minor league titles
- League titles (0): None

Team data
- Name: Charlotte Giants (1926)
- Ballpark: Bennett Park (1926)

The Charlotte Giants were a minor league baseball team based in Charlotte, Michigan. In 1926, the Charlotte Giants played as members of the Michigan State League, completing partial season in the league. Charlotte hosted home minor league games at Bennett Park.

== History ==
Minor league baseball began in Charlotte, Michigan in 1926, when the Flint Vehicles franchise relocated to Charlotte during the season. Charlotte became members of the eight–team Class B level Michigan State League. Charlotte joined the Bay City Wolves, Grand Rapids Black Sox, Kalamazoo Celery Pickers, Ludington Tars, Muskegon Reds, Port Huron Saints and Saginaw Aces teams in league play.

The Charlotte "Giants" played a partial season in 1926. On June 13, 1926, the Michigan–Ontario League merged with the Central League to form the new Michigan State League. The Michigan State League began play June 15, 1926. On July 22, 1926, the Flint Vehicles franchise (18–26) moved to Charlotte, playing the remainder of the season as the Charlotte "Giants." Continuing play in the newly formed level Michigan State League, the Flint/Charlotte team finished in last place.

The Charlotte use of the "Giants" moniker was adopted as a sarcastic response to the last place team. Local newspapers referred to the team as "Dunn's Giants" referring to manager Ray Dunn.

After the Flint franchise relocated, the 1926 Giants compiled a 14–37 record while based in Charlotte. With a 32–63 overall record, the Vehicles/Giants team placed eighth in the Michigan State League final standings. The team played under manager Ray Dunn in both locations. Finishing the league schedule, the Giants ended the season 32.5 games behind the first place Bay City Wolves (64–30) in the final standings. Charlotte finished behind the Bay City Wolves, Grand Rapids Black Sox (51–43), Kalamazoo Celery Pickers (39–59), Ludington Tars (45–51), Muskegon Reds (39–56), Port Huron Saints (56–38) and Saginaw Aces (55–41) in the final standings.

The Michigan State League did not return to play in 1927. Charlotte, Michigan has not hosted another minor league team.

== The ballpark ==
The 1926 Charlotte Giants hosted home minor league games at Bennett Park. Bennett Park is still in use today as a 117-acre public park. The park is directly adjacent to both the Eaton County Fairgrounds and Gobel Field, the latter of which contains athletic facilities. In 1991, the athletic facilities were named after Mac Gobel, a local coach and educator. Gobel Field is located at 1149 Cochran Avenue in Charlotte, Michigan. Bennett Park is located at 1125 Cochran Avenue in Charlotte, Michigan.

== Year–by–year record ==
Year	Record	Finish	Manager	Playoffs/notes
1926	32–63	8th	Ray Dunn	Flint (18–26) moved to Charlotte July 22; No playoffs held

== Notable alumni ==
No 1926 Flint Vehicles / Charlotte Giants rostered players advanced to the major leagues.
