= Jim Riley (outfielder) =

American baseball player (1886-1949)

- Left fielder
- Born: November 10, 1886; Buffalo, New York
- Died: March 25, 1949 (aged 62); Buffalo, New York
- Batted: Right Threw: Right

MLB debut
- August 2, 1910, for the Boston Doves

Last MLB appearance
- August 2, 1910, for the Boston Doves

MLB statistics
- Batting average: .000
- Home runs: 0
- Runs batted in: 0
- On-base percentage: .500
- Stats at Baseball Reference

Teams
- Boston Doves (1910)

James Joseph Riley (November 10, 1886 – March 25, 1949) was a Major League Baseball player. He played one game with the Boston Doves on August 2, 1910. He would go to play in 1912 for the Traverse City Resorters of the Class D Michigan State League as part of a 16-year Minor League Baseball career with teams as high as Double-A including the Toledo Mud Hens, the Binghamton Bingoes, and the Syracuse Stars.
