= Saginaw Bears =

- 1948–1950; (1940–1941, 1948–1951); Saginaw, Michigan

Minor league affiliations
- Class: Class C (1940–1941); Class A (1948–1951)
- League: Michigan State League (1940–1941); Central League (1948–1951)

Major league affiliations
- Team: Chicago White Sox (1941)

Minor league titles
- League titles (0): None
- Wild card berths (1): 1941

Team data
- Name: Saginaw Athletics (1940); Saginaw White Sox (1941); Saginaw Bears (1948–1950); Saginaw Jacks (1951)
- Ballpark: Saginaw Stadium (1940–1941; 1948–1951)

The Saginaw Bears were a minor league baseball team based in Saginaw, Michigan. From 1948 to 1951, Saginaw played exclusively as members of the Class A level Central League, finishing in last place in two of their four seasons in the league.

Hosting home games at Saginaw Stadium, the Saginaw Bears were preceded in minor league play by the 1940 and 1941 Saginaw teams of the Michigan State League, who opened the newly built ballpark. The 1941 Saginaw White Sox were a minor league affiliate of the Chicago White Sox.

== History ==
=== Early teams ===
Minor league baseball in Saginaw started in 1884, when the Saginaw "Greys" played the season as played as members of the Northwestern League. After various Saginaw minor league teams played in the late 1800's and early 1900's, the Saginaw Aces teams played as members of the Michigan-Ontario League from 1919 to 1926.

The Saginaw Aces had played home games at Aces Park, which had hosted minor league teams beginning in 1902. Aces Park was located at Davenport Avenue and Mary Street in Saginaw, Michigan. In 1940, the Saginaw Athletics were formed and began hosting home games at Veterans Memorial Stadium, located at Holland Holland Avenue & 20th Street in Saginaw.

=== 1940 & 1941: Michigan State League ===
After a 13-season hiatus following the demise of the Aces, Saginaw resumed minor league play in 1940. The Saginaw "Athletics" became members of the reformed six–team Class C level Michigan State League. The Athletics joined the Flint Gems, Grand Rapids Dodgers, Lansing Lancers, Muskegon Reds and St. Joseph Autos teams in beginning league play on May 14, 1940.

The Saginaw Athletics franchise was owned by local businessman James "Ike" Bearanger, who also built a new ballpark for his team.

In their first season of Michigan State League play, the 1940 Saginaw Athletics placed second in the Michigan State League standings and advanced to the finals. The Athletics ended the 1940 regular season with a record of 53–48, playing the season under managers Dallas Avery ad Hank Camelli. Camelli was a player/manager, who would later return to manage another Saginaw team. Saginaw finished 10.5 games behind the first place Flint Gems in the final regular season standings. In the first round of the playoffs, Saginaw defeated the Grand Rapids Dodgers 3 games to 1 to advance to the Finals. The Athletics were matched against the St. Joseph Autos in the Finals, but the series was cancelled due to weather without any games being played. Saginaw pitcher Suvern Wright led the Michigan State League with 159 strikeouts.

Hank Camelli served as the catcher/manager of the Athletics at age 25 and later made his major league debut with the Pittsburgh Pirates in 1943. During the 1940 Saginaw season, Camelli played catcher both games of six consecutive doubleheaders. Camelli served in the U.S. Army during World War II.

Walter Peckinpaugh played for Saginaw in 1940 after playing and serving as the captain of the 1939 Michigan Wolverines baseball team in college, playing under coach Ray Fisher.

The newly named Saginaw "White Sox" became a Chicago White Sox minor league affiliate in 1941. Saginaw placed fifth in the 1941 the Michigan State League final standings. The White Sox ended the 1941 season with a 51–62 record, as Saginaw played the season under managers Bill Prince and Walden McMullen. The White Sox finished 21.5 games behind the champion Flint Indians and no playoffs were held in 1941.

The Michigan State League permanently folded following the conclusion of the 1941 season, due to the onset of World War II.

=== 1948 to 1951: Central League ===
After a six-season hiatus following the folding of the Michigan State League, minor league baseball resumed in Saginaw when the 1948 Saginaw "Bears" became members of the six–team, Class A level Central League. The Central League reformed in 1948, following the conclusion of World War II. In the era, Class A was the highest level of the minor leagues. The Dayton Indians, Flint Arrows, Fort Wayne Generals, Grand Rapids Jets and Muskegon Clippers teams joined the Saginaw in beginning Central League play on April 28, 1948.

In their first season of play, the 1948 Saginaw Bears finished in fifth place in the Central League regular season and did not qualify for the four–team playoffs. Saginaw ended the Central League regular season with a record of 55–85 in the six-team final standings. Robert Finley served as manager as Saginaw finished 35.0 games behind the first place Flint Arrows in the regular season standings. The Dayton Indians won the playoffs. Saginaw's Louis Faratto had 185 total hits to lead Central League.

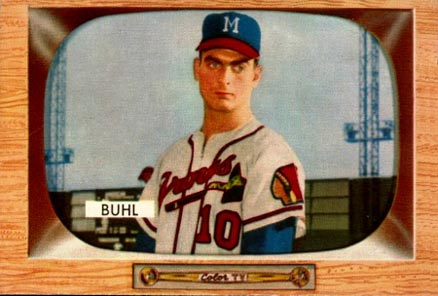
(1955) Bob Buhl, Milwaukee Braves. Bowman baseball card. A Saginaw native, Buhl pitched for the 1948 Saginaw Bears. He became an all-star pitcher in the major leagues.

At age 32, Saginaw player/manager Bob Finley hit .311 playing in 77 games for Saginaw in his dual role. Finley was a football and baseball player at Southern Methodist University. He was drafted in the second round (15th overall pick) by the Pittsburgh Pirates football team in the 1937 NFL draft. However, Finley signed to play professional baseball with the Boston Red Sox in 1937 and began a career in baseball. Finley also served as a college football, American Football League and National Football League game official from 1960 to 1970. Finley later served as the varsity baseball coach at Southern Methodist University from 1965 to 1976.

Saginaw native Bob Buhl pitched for his hometown team in 1948. Buhl's father died in 1946 after Buhl had attended a Chicago White Sox Tryout camp in the summer of 1946 in Saginaw. At age 18, Buhl pitched his first professional season in 1947 for the Madisonville Miners in the Class D level Kitty League, where he had 19 wins in 216 innings and 40 games. At the end of the season, he was upset with the Chicago White Sox offer of a contract paying $200 per month and a promotion to the Class C level. Buhl then learned about some minor league players being declared free agents because they signed contracts while still in high school, which was against the rules. Buhl wrote a letter to Baseball Commissioner Happy Chandler, noting that he did not officially graduate until June 1947, after he signed a contract with Chicago in the winter of 1947. Chandler declared Buhl a free agent and freed Buhl to sign with any team other than the White Sox.

After being declared a free agent, baseball scout Earle Halstead of the Boston Braves, signed Buhl to an $800 per month contract with a new car as a bonus. Buhl was assigned to his hometown independent Saginaw Bears, and he was excited about pitching in his hometown. However, years later he said, "Pitching in my hometown turned about to be a big mistake on my part. Fans expected too much." With the Bears, Buhl compiled 11–12 record with a 5.22 ERA for the season. Buhl later said later, “I used to strike out as many as I walked. I just threw fastballs and tried to throw a curve" with Saginaw. After pitching for the Hartford Chiefs in 1949, Buhl’s professional baseball career was interrupted in 1951 as he served two years in the U.S. Army, serving as a paratrooper stationed at Fort Campbell, Kentucky. In October 1951, while in the service, Buhl married Joyce Miles of Saginaw. Buhl resumed his baseball career after his military service. He went on to a successful 15 season major league career, becoming all-star game selection at the major league level.

Continuing Central League play in 1949, the Saginaw Bears finished last in the six-team Central League standings. The Bears ended the Central League regular season with a record of 58–80, finishing 22.5 games behind the first place Dayton Indians, as Bob Finley again served as the Saginaw manager. With their last place finish, the Saginaw Bears did not qualify for the four-team playoffs, won by the Grand Rapids Jets over the Charleston Senators in the final. Ron Bowen of Saginaw led the Central League with both 25 home runs and 123 RBI.

The Bears in 1950 again finished in last place in the Central League standings. The Bears ended the Central League regular season with a record of 64–68, placing fourth in the standings. Hank Camelli returned to Saginaw as manager, having served previously as player/manager for the 1940 Saginaw Athletics. The Bears finished 26.0 games behind the first place Flint Arrows, who then swept the four-team playoffs to win the league championship in 1950. Pitcher Jimmy Wallace of Saginaw led the Central League with a 2.05 ERA.

Saginaw native Ed Albosta pitched for his hometown Saginaw Bears in 1950 at age 31 and returned to the team in 1951. Albosta had last pitched in the major leagues for the Pittsburgh Pirates in 1946 and had his baseball career interrupted by military service in the U.S. Army World War II.

In their final season, now known as the "Jacks," Saginaw placed third in the 1951 Central League standings in the final season of the six-team, Class A level league. Saginaw ended the 1951 season with a record of 79–59, as Bert Niehoff served as manager at age 67. The Jacks finished 8.0 games behind the champion Dayton Indians in the final standings. No playoffs were held Jacks pitcher Calvin Howe led the Central League with a 2.33 ERA.

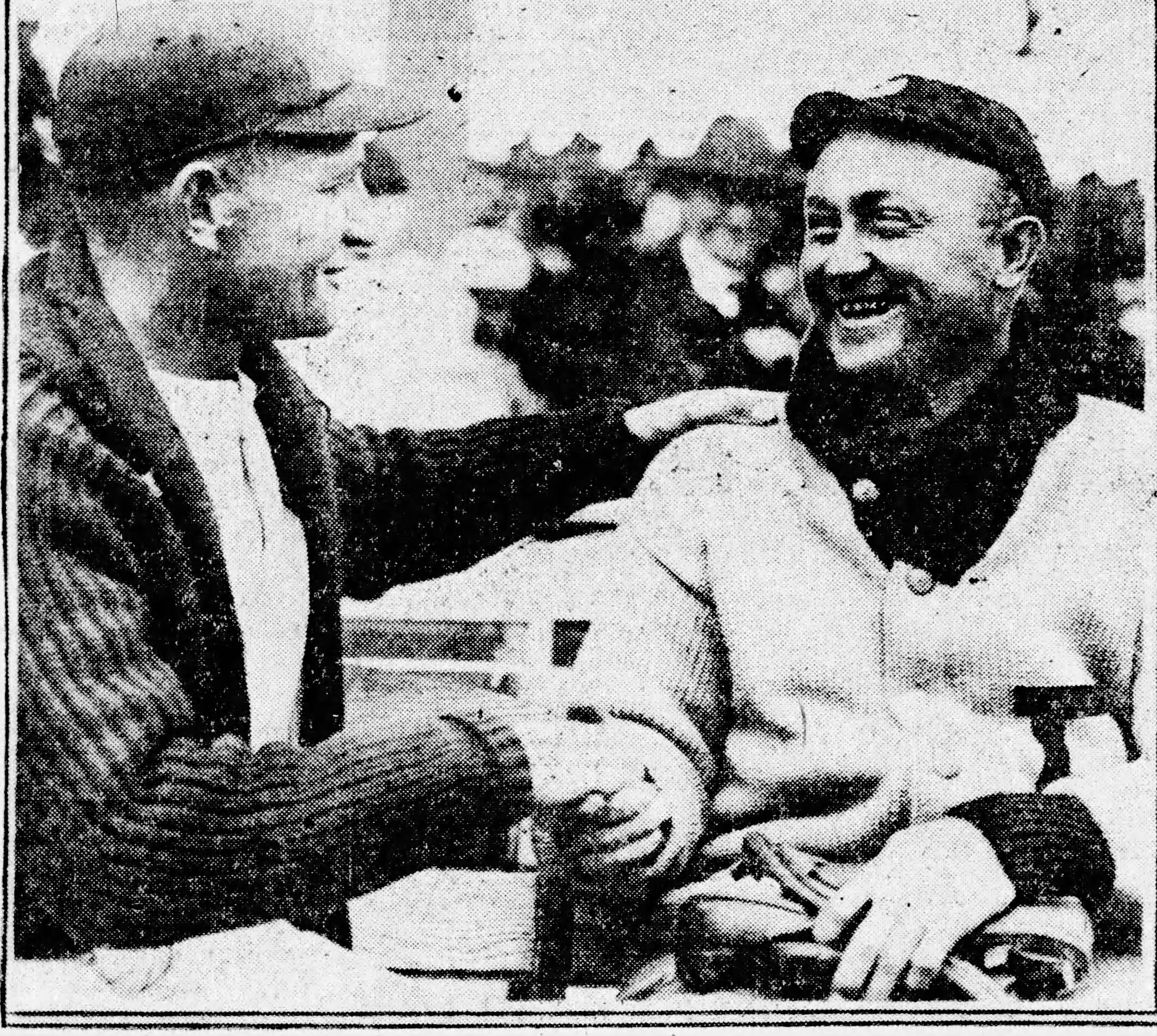
(1924) Atlanta Crackers manager Bert Niehoff shaking hands with Ty Cobb of the Detroit Tigers. A long time minor league manager, Niehoff managed Saginaw in 1951 at age 67 in the final season for the franchise.

Following his major league playing career, which ended in 1918, Saginaw Manager Bert Niehoff began a lengthy career in baseball as a manager, coach, scout and general manager. Prior to becoming the 1951 Saginaw manager, in 1943 and 1944 Niehoff had served as a manager of the South Bend Blue Sox of the All-American Girls Professional Baseball League, a league portrayed in the 1992 motion picture A League of Their Own. The Blue Sox were one of the four original teams in the league in 1943. The South Bend Blue Sox included players Bonnie Baker, Doris Barr and Dottie Schroeder.

In 24 seasons as a minor league manager, Niehoff compiled an 1824–1713 record, with his managerial career spanning between 1922 and 1954. Niehoff coached for the 1929 New York Giants and was a minor league scout for both for the New York Yankees (1948–1949) and later the California Angels (1961–1968), whom he scouted four until age 84. After Saginaw folded following the 1951 season, Niehoff became the general manager of Mobile Bears in 1952.

The Central League permanently folded following the 1951 season and did not reform. Saginaw has not hosted another minor league team.

== The ballpark ==
The Saginaw minor league teams from 1940 to 1951 hosted home games at Veterans Memorial Stadium. In 1948, the ballpark was renamed Saginaw Stadium. Today, the site is still in use as a public park, known as McKinely Park.

The new ballpark was built in 1940, by the Saginaw team owner James "Ike" Bearanger, who formed the "Saginaw Stadium Corporation" to construct the ballpark on a site at Holland Avenue & 20th Street in Saginaw.

McKinely Park is located at 930 South 20th Street in Saginaw, Michigan.

== Timeline ==
Year(s)	# Yrs.	Team	Level	League	Affiliate	Ballpark
1940	1	Saginaw Athletics	Class C	Michigan State League	None	Saginaw Stadium
1941	1	Saginaw White Sox	Class C	Michigan State League	Chicago White Sox	Saginaw Stadium
1948–1950	3	Saginaw Bears	Class A	Central League	None	Saginaw Stadium
1951	2	Saginaw Jacks	Class A	Central League	None	Saginaw Stadium

== Year–by–year records ==
Year	Record	Finish	Manager	Playoffs/notes
1940	53–48	2nd	Dallas Avery / Hank Camelli	Won 1st round Finals cancelled due to weather
1941	51–62	5th	Bill Prince / Walden McMullen	No playoffs held
1948	55–85	5th	Robert Finley	Did not Qualify
1949	58–80	6th	Robert Finley	Did not Qualify
1950	56–81	6th	Hank Camelli	Did not Qualify
1951	79–58	3rd	Bert Niehoff	No playoffs held

== Notable alumni ==
- Ed Albosta (1950–1951)
- Bob Buhl (1948) 2x MLB All-Star
- Milt Byrnes (1951)
- Hank Camelli (1941, 1950, MGR)
- Robert Finley (1948–1949, MGR)
- Preston Gomez (1949)
- Luke Hamlin (1948, 1950)
- Sam Lowry (1940)
- Bill Mueller (1940)
- Bert Niehoff (1951, MGR)
- Dick Phillips (1951)
- Jim Schelle (1940–1941)
- Everett Robinson (1948)
- Lefty Wallace (1950)
- Bob Whitcher (1949)

== See also ==
- Saginaw Athletics players
- Saginaw Bears players
- Saginaw Jacks players
- Saginaw White Sox players

== See also ==
Saginaw, Michigan minor league baseball history
