= Manistee Champs =

- 1912–1914; (1890, 1911–1914); Manistee, Michigan

Minor league affiliations
- Class: Independent (1890); Class D (1911–1914)
- League: Michigan State League (1890, 1911–1914)

Major league affiliations
- Team: None

Minor league titles
- League titles (3): 1911; 1912; 1913

Team data
- Name: Manistee (1890); Manistee Colts (1911); Manistee Champs (1912–1914)
- Ballpark: Parkdale Grounds (1890, 1911–1914)

The Manistee Champs were a minor league baseball team based in Manistee, Michigan. The Manistee teams played exclusively as members of the Michigan State League, winning three consecutive league titles from 1911 to 1913, leading to the "Champs" nickname. First known as Manistee "Colts" in 1911, the Champs played from 1912 to 1914. Manistee first played in the 1890 Michigan State League.

In 1914, the Manistee franchise was expelled from the Michigan State League during the season and was relocated to Belding, Michigan.

Mainstee teams hosted minor league home games at the Parkdale Grounds.

== History ==
=== Early teams ===
Organized baseball began in Manistee as early as 1876, when the Manistee town team hosted home games at the Canfield's Ravine ballpark. Admission was free.

Minor league baseball began in Manistee, Michigan in 1890, when the "Manistee" team became members of the six–team Independent level Michigan State League. The 1890 Michigan State League folded during the season, with Manistee in second place. Manistee had compiled a record of a 16–6 record when the league folded on June 13, 1890. The Michigan State League folded one day after the first place Grand Rapids Shamrocks (17–6) left to join the International League. The Manistee team was managed by John Murphy.

Manistee hosted a semi-professional team in the early 1900's. Jack Morrissey played for Manistee while working as a manager of a lumberyard in town. Seen by scouts while playing for Manistee, Morrissey was signed to a professional contract and played with the Grand Rapids Furnituremakers in 1901.

=== 1911 to 1913: Three Michigan State League championships ===
In 1911, minor league baseball returned to Manistee, Michigan, with the team winning a championship. The Manistee "Colts" returned to play as members of the reformed six–team Class D level Michigan State League. The Manistee Colts and Boyne City Boosters franchises were formed and joined four returning 1910 Western Michigan League teams, the Cadillac Chiefs, Holland Wooden Shoes, Muskegon Reds and Traverse City Resorters in beginning Michigan State League play on May 23, 1911.

In their first season of play, the Manistee Colts ended the 1911 Michigan State League season with the league championship. With a record of 74–45, the Colts ended the season just 0.5 game ahead of the second place Cadillac Chiefs and Muskegon Reds, who had identical 73–45 records. Managed by Ed R. Somerlott, Earl Zook and Connie Lewis, the Colts won the championship in the league, which did not have playoffs in 1911. Pitcher Ray Williams of Manistee led the league with both 25 wins and 169 strikeouts.

Continuing league play in 1912, Manistee won their second consecutive Michigan State League championship after adopting a new nickname. The renamed Manistee "Champs" finished the season in first place in the final standings with a record of 83–35. Playing the season under returning manager Connie Lewis, Manistee ended the season 4.5 games ahead of the second place Traverse City Resorters in the six–team league final standings. Pitcher Omer Benn of Manistee led the league with 22 wins.

Continuing Michigan State League play, the 1913 Manistee Champs won a third consecutive championship. With a final record of 73–47, the team placed first, playing again under the direction of manager Connie Lewis. Manistee finished 10.5 games ahead of the second place Traverse City Resorters in the six–team league. No playoffs were held in 1913. Grover Prough of Manistee led the league with 14 home runs, while teammate John Radloff led the Michigan State with both 18 wins and 235 strikeouts.

=== 1914: Expelled from the league ===
In their final season of play, the Manistee Champs relocated during the season amidst controversy as the Michigan State League began the season as a six–team league. On September 1, 1914, the Boyne City Boosters and Traverse City Resorters franchises both folded, leaving four remaining teams. On September 9, 1914, the Manistee franchise was expelled from the Michigan State League and the team was relocated to Belding, Michigan for the remainder of the season. The Manistee Champs were relocated with a 56–51 record on that date and the team finished the remainder of the season playing as the Belding Champs.

After roster changes and relocation, the Champs compiled a 1–13 record while based in Belding and ended the season in last place. When the season ended, the team placed fourth of four teams in the 1914 Michigan State League final standings. The Champs ended the season with a record of 57–64 overall record, playing under manager Louis Haidt in both locations. The Manistee/Belding team finished 18.5 games behind the first place and champion Muskegon Speeders in the final league standings.

The Michigan State League folded after the 1914 season with the beginning of World War I. When the league resumed play in 1926, Manistee did not field a franchise. Manistee, Michigan has not hosted another minor league team.

In 1934, the Manistee "Saints" began play as a semi–professional team and have continued uninterrupted play. Today, the Manistee Saints continue play as members of the Great Lakes UBL.

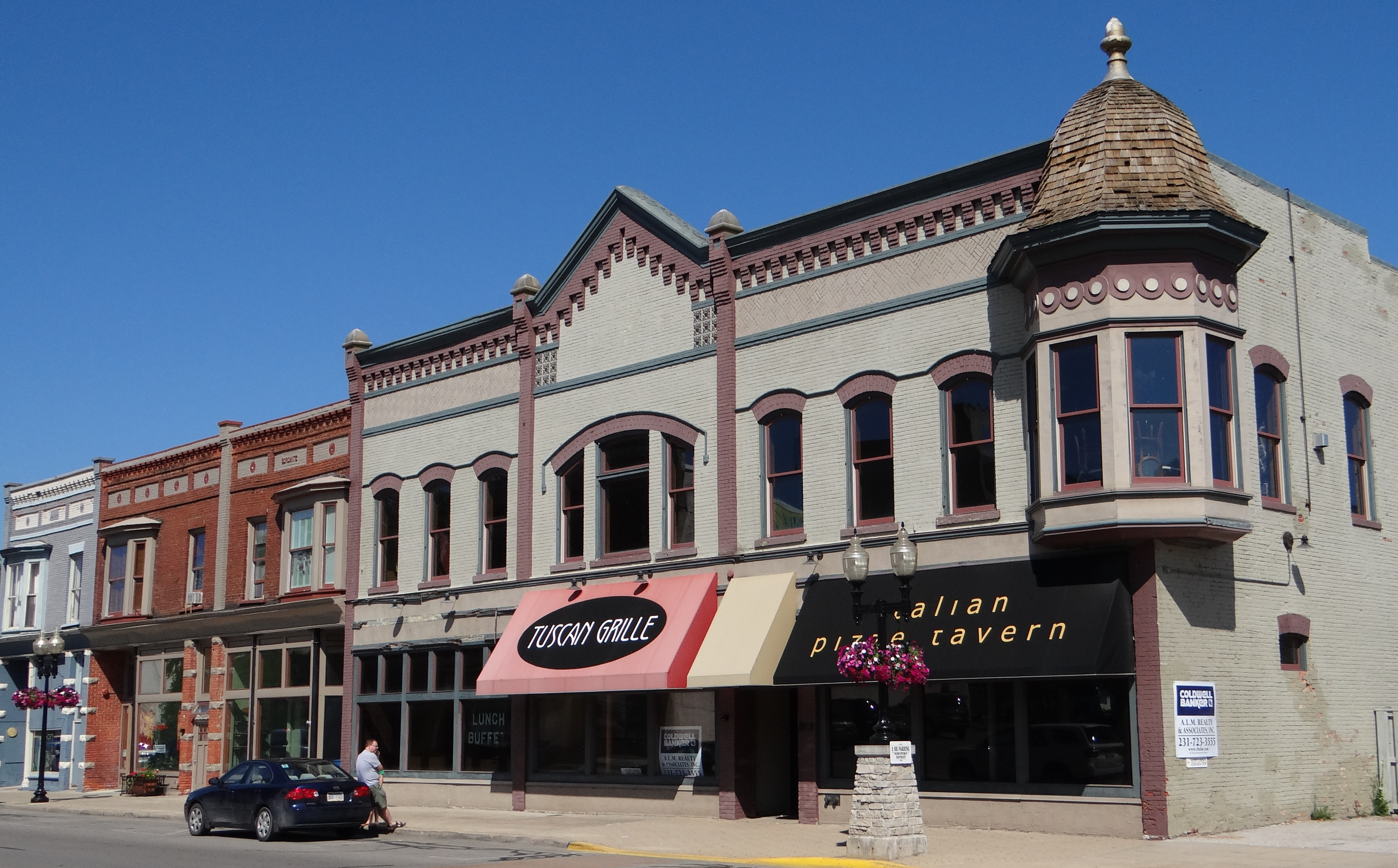
(2012) River Street, downtown Manistee. National Register of Historic Places. Manistee, Michigan.

== The ballpark ==
The Manistee, Michigan minor league teams hosted minor league teams home games at the Parkdale Grounds. The ballpark was located within the Parkdale Fairgrounds, located north of Manistee and the Manistee River.

In the era, the ballpark was situated within the fairgrounds that were within the developing Parkdale District of Manistee. Today, the ballpark location would be north of Parkdale Road between Hahn Road and Hill Road in Manistee.

== Timeline ==
Year(s)	# Yrs.	Team	Level	League	Ballpark
1890	1	Manistee	Independent	Michigan State League	Parkdale Grounds
1911	1	Manistee Colts	Class D	Michigan State League	Parkdale Grounds
1912–1914	3	Manistee Champs	Class D	Michigan State League	Parkdale Grounds

== Year-by-year records ==
Year	Record	Finish	Manager	Playoffs/notes
1890	16–8	2nd	John Murphy	League folded June 13
1911	74–45	1st	Ed R. Somerlott / Earl Zook / Connie Lewis	League champions
1912	83–35	1st	Connie Lewis	League champions
1913	73–47	1st	Connie Lewis	League champions
1914	57–64	4th	Louis Haidt	Team was expelled (56–61) franchise moved to Belding September 9

== Notable alumni ==
- Henry Benn (1911–1912)
- Hub Hart (1912)
- Gene Layden (1914)
- Frank Killen (1890)
- Jack McMahon (1890)
- Earl Smith (1913)
- Bill Stellberger (1890)

== See also ==
- Manistee (minor league baseball) players
- Manistee Colts players
- Manistee Champs players
