= LaRue Kirby =

American baseball player (1889–1961)

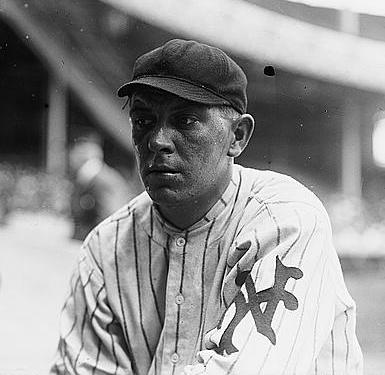
- Outfielder
- Born: December 30, 1889; Eureka, Michigan, US
- Died: June 10, 1961 (aged 71); Lansing, Michigan, US
- Batted: Both Threw: Right

MLB debut
- August 7, 1912, for the New York Giants

Last MLB appearance
- September 14, 1915, for the St. Louis Terriers

MLB statistics
- Batting average: .230
- Home runs: 2
- Runs batted in: 34
- Stats at Baseball Reference

Teams
- New York Giants (1912); St. Louis Terriers (1914–1915)

LaRue Kirby (December 30, 1889 – June 10, 1961) was an American baseball outfielder who made his professional debut in 1910 with the Class D Traverse City Resorters of the Michigan State League, and then would advance in 1912 to Major League Baseball where he played for the New York Giants and St. Louis Terriers.

He also pitched 18 innings in the major leagues, 11 innings for the New York Giants in 1912 and 7 innings for the St. Louis Terriers of the Federal League in 1915, going 1-0 with a 5.50 ERA.
