= Owosso Colts =

- 1895; Owosso, Michigan

Minor league affiliations
- Class: Class B (1895)
- League: Michigan State League (1895)

Major league affiliations
- Team: None

Minor league titles
- League titles (0): None

Team data
- Name: Owosso Colts (1895)
- Ballpark: Athletic Association Grounds (1895)

The Owosso Colts were a minor league baseball team based in Owosso, Michigan. In 1895, the Colts played as a member of the Class B level Michigan State League, before folding during the season.

The Colts hosted minor league home games at the Athletic Association Grounds in Owosso.

== History ==
The Owosso Colts became the first minor league team in Owosso in 1895 when the Colts became members of the reformed Class B level Michigan State League. The Michigan State League began play on May 21, 1895, with the Adrian Reformers, Battle Creek Adventists, Kalamazoo Kazoos, Lansing Senators and Port Huron Marines joining Owosso as the six member teams. The Michigan State League first played in the 1889 and 1890 seasons before reforming in 1895.

During the 1895 season, the Owosso Colts had a series against the Adrian Demons that became noteworthy. The Adrian Demons had future Baseball Hall of Fame member Honus Wagner on their roster. Prior to their series against the Colts, the Demons signed six members of the Negro leagues baseball team Page Fence Giants to play against the Owosso Colts, possibly as injury replacements. The Page Fence Giants were also based in Adrian, Michigan and the two franchises shared management groups. In the 1895 pre–season, speaking of the Page Fence Giants, the Chicago Inter Ocean stated that the “Giants are the best colored team ever organized.” In April, 1895, the Page fence Giants had played two exhibition games against the Cincinnati Reds, losing both games. The six players moving from the Giants to the Demons were William Binga, Pete Burns, Baseball Hall of Fame member Bud Fowler, Vasco Graham, Joe Miller and George Wilson. Binga, Burns and Wilson returned to playing for the Page Fence Giants after the series against Owosso.

During the series, Adrian swept all three games playing at Owosso. The Demons returned home to Adrian and the team was met by celebrating fans. The entire team was taken out for a dinner celebration over the victories.

On August 8, 1895, the Owosso Colts swept a double header from the Port Huron Marines by scores of 4–2 and 11–5.

After beginning league play in 1895, the Owosso Colts, as well as the Port Huron Marines, both disbanded from the Michigan State League on September 3, 1895. Struggling financially all season, the Owosso owners noted that with fan support the team had made enough profit to pay the players through the Labor Day weekend and thanked the fans for their support. Owosso had a record of 34–47 when the franchise permanently folded. Fred Craves and Frank Wickine served as the Owosso managers. The Adrian Demons captured the 1895 Michigan State League championship with a 57–30 record, with Honus Wagner playing for Adrian in his first professional season at age 21.

The Michigan State League folded after the 1895 season, before returning to play in 1897 as a six–team league. Owosso did not return to league play in 1897. The 1895 Owosso Colts were the only minor league based in Owosso, Michigan to date.

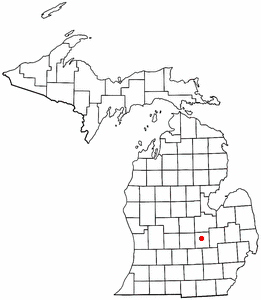
Owosso, Michigan location

== The ballpark ==
The Owosso Colts played 1895 home minor league games at the Athletic Association Grounds. The ballpark was referenced to have been located on Washington Street in Owosso, Michigan and owned by the Owosso Athletic Association. After the Colts disbanded, the ballpark was repurposed into an ice-skating rink. Today, the site is commercial and industrial property.

== Year–by–year record ==
Year	Record	Finish	Manager	Playoffs/Notes
1895	34–47	NA	Fred Craves / Frank Wickine	Team folded September 3

== Notable alumni ==
John A. Bloomingston (1895)
