= Cal Neeman =

American baseball player (1929–2015)

- Catcher
- Born: February 18, 1929; Valmeyer, Illinois, U.S.
- Died: October 1, 2015 (aged 86); Lake St. Louis, Missouri, U.S.
- Batted: Right Threw: Right

MLB debut
- April 16, 1957, for the Chicago Cubs

Last MLB appearance
- September 29, 1963, for the Washington Senators

MLB statistics
- Batting average: .224
- Home runs: 30
- Runs batted in: 97
- Stats at Baseball Reference

Teams
- Chicago Cubs (1957–1960); Philadelphia Phillies (1960–1961); Pittsburgh Pirates (1962); Cleveland Indians (1963); Washington Senators (1963)

Calvin Amandus Neeman (February 18, 1929 – October 1, 2015) was an American professional baseball player who played catcher in the Major Leagues from 1957 to 1963 for the Chicago Cubs, Philadelphia Phillies, Pittsburgh Pirates, Cleveland Indians and Washington Senators. A native of Valmeyer, Illinois, he threw and batted right-handed, stood 6 feet 1 inch (1.85 m) tall and weighed 192 pounds (87 kg). He was an alumnus of Illinois Wesleyan University, where he played both baseball and basketball.

Newman entered baseball in 1949 after being signed to a New York Yankees' contract by scout Lou Maguolo. He spent six seasons in the Bombers' farm system (missing 1951–52 while performing United States Army service in the Korean War) until his selection by the Cubs in the 1956 Rule 5 draft.

Neeman led all National League catchers in games caught (118), double plays, putouts and caught-stealing as a Cubs' rookie in 1957. He collected a career-high 107 hits and 39 runs batted in, hitting .258 with ten home runs. The next year, Neeman hit a career-best 12 homers in only 76 games played, and batted .259. But his production declined drastically in 1959 and he spent the final five years of his MLB tenure as a backup catcher, with parts of 1961–63 back in the minor leagues.

In 376 games played in the majors, Neeman had 224 hits, including 35 doubles, ten triples, 30 home runs and 97 runs batted in. He hit .224 lifetime.

Neeman died on October 1, 2015, at his home in Lake St. Louis, Missouri. He was 86.
