= Archie Yelle =

American baseball player (1892–1983)

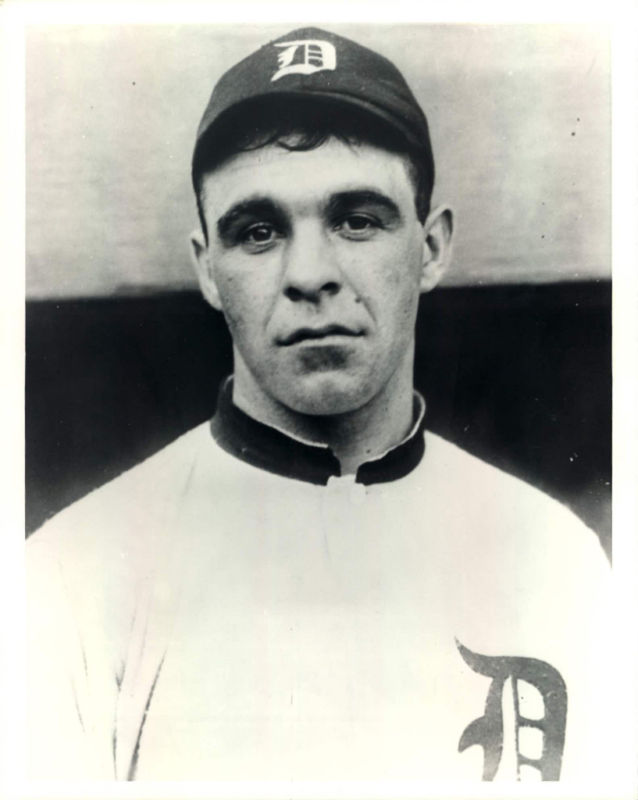
- Catcher
- Born: June 11, 1892; Saginaw, Michigan, U.S.
- Died: May 2, 1983 (aged 90); Woodland, California, U.S.
- Batted: Right Threw: Right

MLB debut
- May 12, 1917, for the Detroit Tigers

Last MLB appearance
- July 10, 1919, for the Detroit Tigers

MLB statistics
- Batting average: .161
- Home runs: 0
- Runs batted in: 7
- Stats at Baseball Reference

Teams
- Detroit Tigers (1917–1919)

Archie Joseph Yelle (June 11, 1892 – May 2, 1983) was an American professional baseball catcher. He played for 20 years from 1911 to 1930, including 87 games in Major League Baseball for the Detroit Tigers from 1917 to 1919. He also played seven years in the Pacific Coast League for the San Francisco Seals. In 17 seasons in the minor leagues, Yelle appeared in 1,449 games, 1,305 of them as a catcher. He was posthumously inducted into the Saginaw County Sports Hall of Fame in 2013.

== Early years ==
Yelle was born in Saginaw, Michigan, in 1892. He played three sports at Saginaw High School.

== Professional baseball ==
=== Minor leagues ===
Yelle began his career in organized baseball in 1911 with the Boyne City Boosters club from Boyne City, Michigan. He then played for the Lansing Senators in 1911, the Saginaw Krazy Kats in 1911 and 1912, the Bay City Billikens in 1912, the Peoria Distillers from 1912 to 1914, the London Tecumsehs and Jersey City Skeeters in 1915, and the Providence Grays in 1916.

=== Detroit Tigers ===
Yelle played for the Detroit Tigers of the American League from 1917 to 1919. According to one published account of questionable accuracy, Yelle signed with the Tigers after claiming he could strike out Ty Cobb on three pitches. He was given a tryout with the Tigers, and on the three pitches he had claimed he would need to strike out Cobb, Cobb hit three home runs. In fact, Yelle was drafted by the Tigers in September 1914.

Yelle appeared in 25 games in 1917, 13 as a starter, and compiled a .137 batting average and a .214 on-base percentage. The following year, he appeared in 56 games, 43 as the Tigers' starting catcher, and compiled a .174 batting average and a .227 on-base percentage. In 1919, he appeared in only six games for the Tigers and failed to hit in five at bats. He appeared in his last major league game on July 20, 1919.

=== Minor leagues ===
After being released by the Tigers, Yelle played for the San Francisco Seals in the Pacific Coast League for seven seasons from 1920 to 1926.

In 1921, Yelle compiled a career high .293 batting average in 113 games for the Seals. In 1922, he appeared in 108 games, compiled a .254 batting average, and helped lead the Seals win the PCL championship with a 127–72 record. In 1925, the Seals were 128–71, winning another PCL title. That year, Yelle hit .267 in 101 games and was chosen by The Sporting News as the catcher for the PCL All Star Team.

On October 6, 1926, the Seals sold Yelle to the Portland Beavers of the PCL. Yelle appeared in 111 games for Portland in 1927 and compiled a .260 batting average.

After leaving the PCL, Yelle continued to play for several more years for the Des Moines Demons in 1928, Atlanta Crackers in 1929 and 1930, Columbus Foxes in 1930, and Memphis Chickasaws and New Orleans Pelicans in 1930. He also served as manager of the Des Moines team in 1928.

In 17 seasons in the minor leagues, Yelle appeared in 1,449 games, 1,305 of them as a catcher.

== Later years ==
After his baseball career ended, Yelle worked as a police officer and later police chief in Woodland, California, from 1935 to 1965. He later worked as a prison guard. Yelle died in Woodland in 1983 at age 90. He was buried at Monument Hill Memorial Park in Woodland. Yelle was posthumously inducted into the Saginaw County Sports Hall of Fame in 2013.
