= Al LaMacchia =

American baseball player (1921-2010)

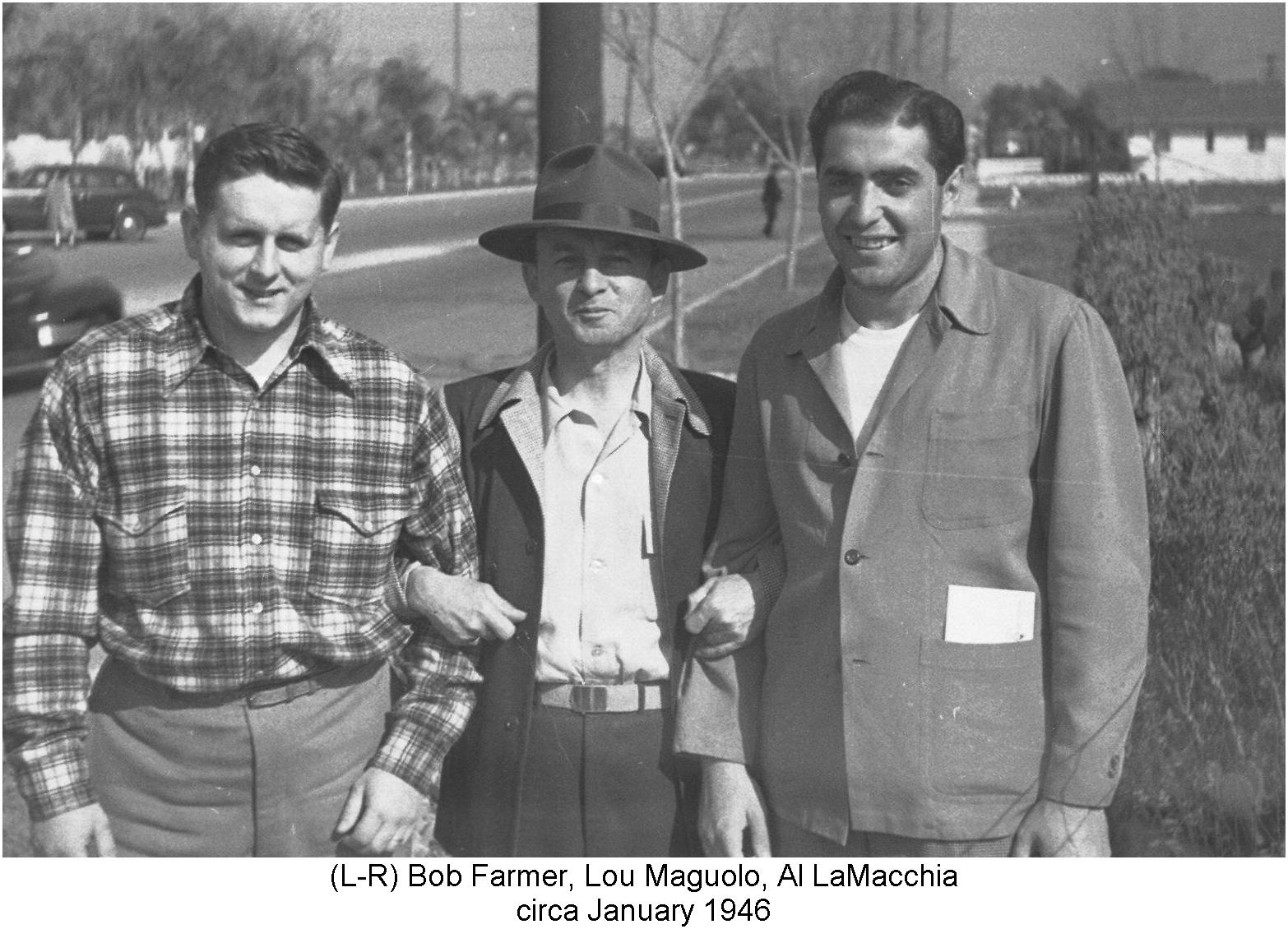
- (L-R) Rob Farmer, Lou Maguolo and LaMacchia (1946)
- Pitcher
- Born: July 22, 1921; St. Louis, Missouri, U.S.
- Died: September 15, 2010 (aged 89); San Antonio, Texas, U.S.
- Batted: Right Threw: Right

MLB debut
- September 22, 1943, for the St. Louis Browns

Last MLB appearance
- June 29, 1946, for the Washington Senators

MLB statistics
- Win–loss record: 2-2
- Earned run average: 6.46
- Strikeouts: 7
- Stats at Baseball Reference

Teams
- St. Louis Browns (1943, 1945–1946); Washington Senators (1946)

Alfred Anthony LaMacchia (July 22, 1921 – September 15, 2010) was an American professional baseball player and scout. He was a right-handed pitcher who spent 14 years in the minor leagues where he accumulated a record of 159–117 and spent parts of three seasons (1943, 1945–46) with the St. Louis Browns and Washington Senators compiling a 2–2 record. After his playing career ended, LaMacchia spent six decades as a scout with the Philadelphia Phillies, Atlanta Braves, Toronto Blue Jays, Tampa Bay Rays, and Los Angeles Dodgers, during which time he discovered dozens of players who made it to the major leagues.

== Playing career ==
LaMacchia was born in St. Louis, Missouri, and served with the United States Army during World War II. He started his pitching career in the St. Louis Browns organization with the Class D Paragould Browns in 1940, where he had a 16–7 record and worked his way up to the majors with a 15–5 record with the Class C St. Joseph Autos in 1941 and a 15–16 record with the Class A1 San Antonio Missions in 1942. LaMacchia made his major league debut on September 27, 1943, with the Browns, pitching portions of three seasons (1943, 1945–46) as a relief pitcher with the Browns and Washington Senators, with a 2–2 career record, 6.46 earned run average and seven strikeouts in 30 2/3 innings pitched. He returned to the minor leagues, playing for various teams and organizations until 1954.

== Scouting ==
After completing his playing career, LaMacchia became a scout with the Phillies, Braves, Blue Jays, Devil Rays and Dodgers. LaMacchia eschewed the use of computers, radar guns and stop watches as scouting tools, saying "I trust my eyes... Been good so far". He is credited with having scouted players including George Bell, Cito Gaston, Dale Murphy, Dave Stieb, Rocco Baldelli, and David Wells. He convinced Dodgers General Manager Ned Colletti to pursue outfielder Andre Ethier, who had been playing in the Oakland A's organization. While with the Blue Jays he was a vice president when the team won back-to-back championships in the 1992 World Series and 1993 World Series.

Pat Gillick, a scout for the New York Yankees, competed against LaMacchia for players in South Texas, mentioned LaMacchia during his induction speech at the National Baseball Hall of Fame on July 24, 2011. Gillick hired LaMacchia to work for the Toronto Blue Jays in 1976.

He was signed by St. Louis Browns scout Lou Maguolo.

LaMacchia died at age 89 on September 15, 2010, at his home in San Antonio, Texas, after having experienced a stroke in the weeks before his death.
