= Lou Maguolo =

American Major League Baseball executive

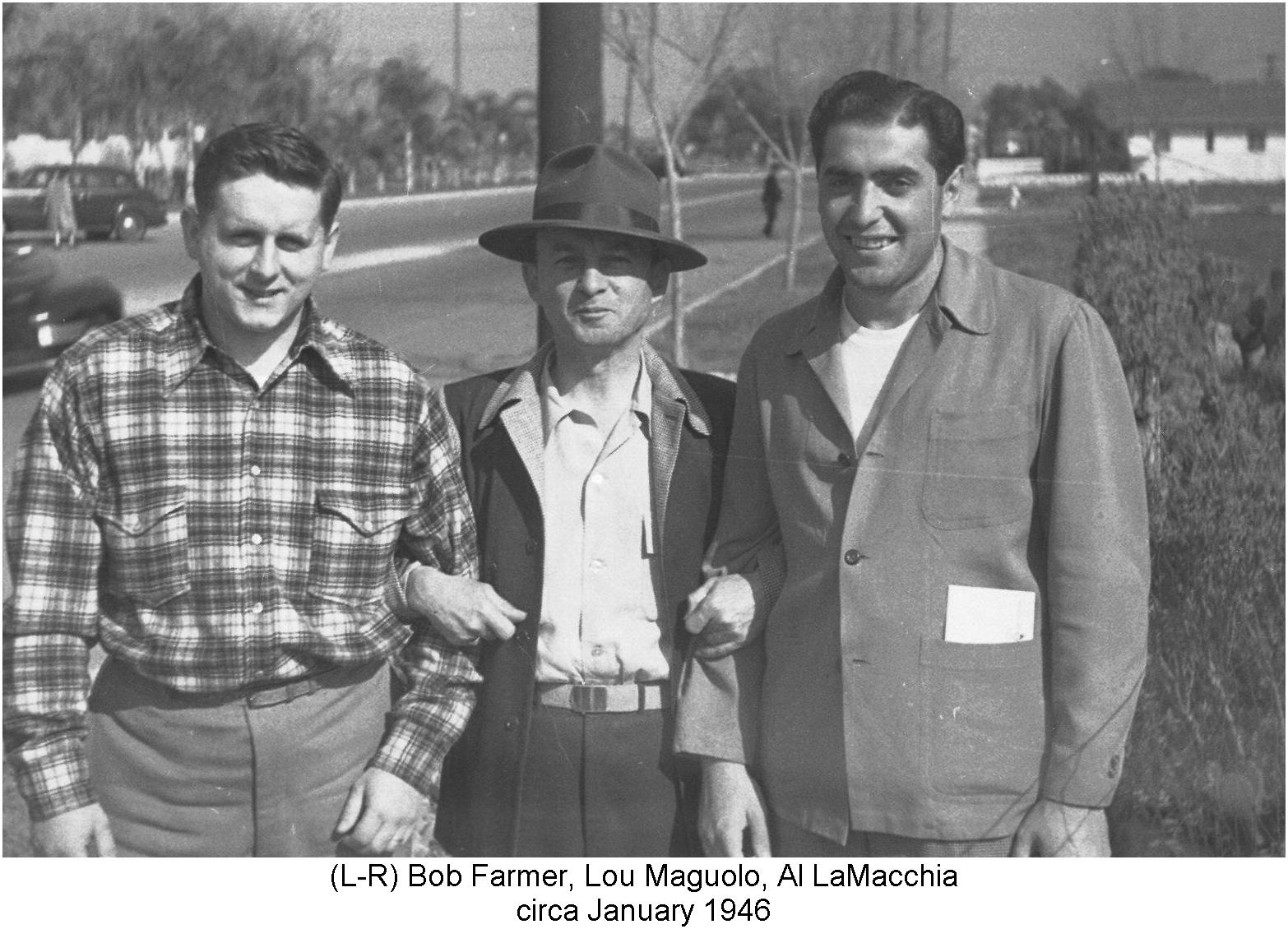
Maguolo and LaMacchia

Louis Dewey Maguolo (8 June 1899 – 14 May 1977) was an American Major League Baseball executive. A baseball scout for the St. Louis Browns and New York Yankees, he was best known for signing Yankee greats Bill Skowron, Tony Kubek, Fritz Peterson, Jim Bouton, and Elston Howard. He is credited with signing at least 40 athletes who eventually played in the major leagues, ten of them for the Browns, including Al LaMacchia, Don Lenhardt, Marlin Stuart, Fuzz White, Jackie Juelich, Babe Martin, George Hausmann, and Roy Sievers. Others signed for the Yankees include Whitey Herzog, Cal Neeman, Norm Siebern, Lee Thomas, Jim Robertson, Jay Ward, Bob Keegan, Herb Plews, Lou Skizas, Bob Wiesler, Al Pilarcik, Bud Zipfel, Paul Hinrichs, Zach Monroe, Lloyd Merritt, Steve Kraly, Tom Metcalf, Mike Jurewicz, Hal Stowe, Jim Finigan, John Gabler, Joe Pactwa, Larry Murray, Jerry Lumpe, Jerry Kenney, Dave Bergman, and Dennis Werth.

Maguolo was Head Scout for the Browns and Chief Midwest Scout for the Yankees. His territory usually covered the St. Louis area of Missouri, all of Illinois and Wisconsin, the western half of Kentucky, and western half of Indiana. He was based in St. Louis, Missouri.

Though only 5'5" tall and 112 pounds, Maguolo made the all-city team in St. Louis as an outfielder at Yeatman High School, where he also quarterbacked the football team. He played both baseball and football for Washington University in St. Louis and was named to the all-Missouri Valley Conference baseball team in 1921, 1922, and 1923. His father, however, often told him, "Baseball is a bum's game, and so is football," and withheld his allowance in high school and financial assistance for college. Maguolo helped pay for college on barnstorming baseball teams with other college players, including future major league player and manager Eddie Dyer. Maguolo performed under the name "Meyers" to avoid losing his college athletic eligibility. He graduated from Washington University School of Engineering with a degree in civil engineering, but he pursued a baseball career instead, at first as baseball coach for McKinley and Beaumont high schools in St. Louis. While coaching, he began working as a "bird dog" or assistant scout for the Brooklyn Dodgers. At the urging of his childhood friend Andy High, an infielder for the Dodgers and St. Louis Cardinals, he became a scout for the St. Louis Browns in 1936. Soon after, the Browns made him Head Scout, a position he held until 1942, when he went into the Army for World War II. In 1947 the New York Yankees hired him as a scout.The Yankees' mandatory retirement policy required him to step down as Chief Midwest Scout in 1970, but he continued to scout part time for New York until October 1975.

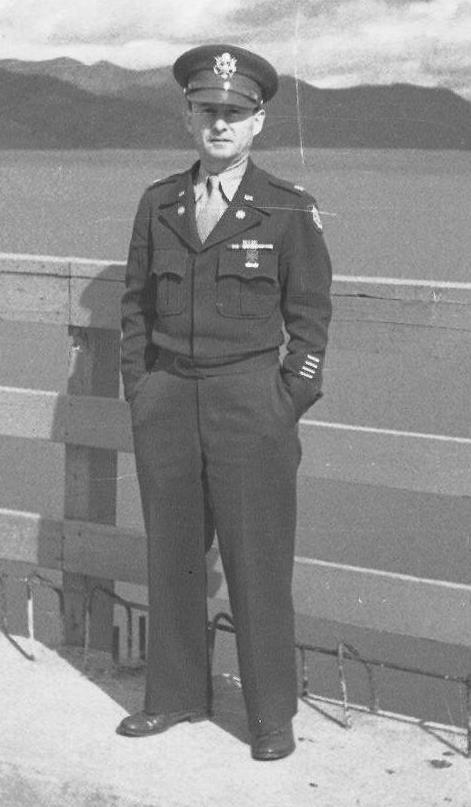
Major Lou Maguolo, US Army

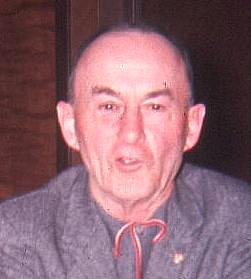
Maguolo on a scouting trip to the Chicago area - 1964

During World War II, Maguolo served in the US Army in the Pacific Northwest. His duties were primarily in Special Services Recreation, and he attained the rank of major. Maguolo managed several army baseball teams, primarily at Fort Lawton, with rosters that included future major-league first baseman Earl Torgeson.

The son of a furniture maker, Maguolo spent his off seasons working at Century Skilcraft Co., the family furniture factory in St. Louis, where he built back bars, stools, lamps, chairs, and stairways out of broken bats and other sports equipment.

In the 1950s, Maguolo hired and trained legendary Yankee scout Art Stewart. He reportedly gave Stewart this advice: "Keep your eyes open. Keep your ears open. Keep your mouth shut." Then, the story goes, Maguolo zipped his mouth, for emphasis.
