= Bunny Brief =

American baseball player (1892–1963)

- Brief, c 1922
- First baseman / Outfielder
- Born: July 3, 1892; Remus, Michigan, U.S.
- Died: February 11, 1963 (aged 70); Milwaukee, Wisconsin, U.S.
- Batted: Right Threw: Right

MLB debut
- September 22, 1912, for the St. Louis Browns

Last MLB appearance
- June 24, 1917, for the Pittsburgh Pirates

MLB statistics
- Batting average: .223
- Home runs: 5
- Runs batted in: 59
- Stats at Baseball Reference

Teams
- St. Louis Browns (1912–1913); Chicago White Sox (1915); Pittsburgh Pirates (1917)

Anthony Vincent "Bunny" Brief (born Anthony John Grzeszkowski; July 3, 1892 – February 11, 1963) was an American professional baseball first baseman and outfielder whose career spanned 19 seasons from 1910 to 1928. He played 184 games in Major League Baseball for the St. Louis Browns (1912–13), Chicago White Sox (1915), and Pittsburgh Pirates (1917).

Though he never hit more than two home runs in any of his Major League seasons, Brief holds the all-time record for home runs in the American Association with 256. His eight minor league home run crowns are tied for the most ever, with Ken Guettler. He won home run crowns in: 1911 – Michigan State League (10); 1912 – Michigan State League (13); 1916 – Pacific Coast League (33); 1920 – American Association (23); 1921 – American Association (42); 1922 – American Association (40); 1925 – American Association (37) and 1926 – American Association (26).

== Early life ==
Brief was born in 1892. He was one of six children born to immigrants born in Germany of Polish ancestry.

There are differing accounts as to the origin of his name. According to Len Levin's biography of Brief for the Society for American Baseball Research (SABR), Brief's birth name was Anthony John Greszkowki, and the family changed its name to "Brief" during Brief's childhood. Other sources written during Brief's lifetime reported that the family name was Bordetzki, and that he changed his name after beginning his professional baseball career. In a 1954 article for Parade magazine, Ernie Harwell reported that Brief complained that his name was always abbreviated in box scores (e.g., "B'rd'ki"), leading to the following suggestion:

"Change your name," the friend suggested. "Make it brief."
"Okay", said Bordetzki. "From now on, you can call me "Bunny Brief."

Sources are also in conflict as to his place of birth, some listing Remus, Michigan, and others Big Rapids, Michigan. At some point during Brief's childhood, the family moved to Traverse City, Michigan, where Brief attended Traverse City High School.

== Professional baseball ==
=== Traverse City (1910–1912) ===
Brief began playing professional baseball at age 17 with the Class D Traverse City Resorters of the Michigan State League. He played for Traverse City in 1910, 1911, and 1912. In 1912, he compiled a .353 batting average and .466 slugging percentage in 119 games.

=== St. Louis Browns (1912–1913) ===
Brief was called up by the St. Louis Browns at the end of the 1912 season and compiled a .310 average and .408 on-base percentage in 53 plate appearances. He returned to the Browns in 1913 and saw his batting average drop by nearly 100 points to .217.

Brief was sent to the Kansas City Blues of the American Association late in the 1913 season. During the 1914 season, he appeared in 169 games for the Blues, compiling a .318 batting average, .391 on-base percentage, and .502 slugging percentage, with 51 doubles, 16 triples and 38 stolen bases.

=== Chicago and Salt Lake City (1915–1916) ===
Prior to the 1915 season, Brief was acquired by the Chicago White Sox. He appeared in 48 games for the White Sox, but his batting average plummeted to .214.

In late July 1915, Brief was sold to the Salt Lake City Bees of the Pacific Coast League. He went on a tear in Salt Lake, appearing in 82 games in the last half of the 1915 season, compiling a .363 batting average and .524 slugging percentage. He remained with Salt Lake City in 1916, appearing in a career-high 195 games with 33 home runs, a .314 batting average, and a .517 slugging percentage. He became a favorite of the Salt Lake City fans who showered him with silver dollars after he hit home runs. On one occasion, he was showered with over $400 which he used take his wife on a honeymoon.

=== Pittsburgh and Louisville (1917–1918) ===
In early May 1917, Brief was sold to the Pittsburgh Pirates. Brief appeared in only 36 games for the Pirates. Again, his batting average dropped dramatically when confronted with major league pitching, tallying only 25 hits in 115 at bats for a .217 average. At the end of June 1917, Brief was sent to the Louisville Colonels of the American Association. He appeared in 48 games for Louisville, compiling a .289 batting average.

=== Kansas City (1919–1924) ===
In November 1918, Brief was reaquired by the Kansas City Blues. He spent the next six seasons (1919-1924) with the Blues. During this period, Brief had some of the best seasons in the history of the American Association. He tallied 626 RBIs from 1918 to 1922. He led the American Association in both home runs and RBIs three consecutive years from 1920 to 1922. In 1921, he compiled a .361 batting average and career highs in slugging percentage (.685) and home runs (42). He also set American Association records with 191 RBIs and 166 runs scored in 1921. In 1923, he hit .359 and tallied a career-high 230 hits. In 1924, he hit .338 with a career-high 58 doubles. One columnist wrote that Brief "was to the minors what Babe Ruth was to the majors -- a hitter without a peer."

Brief spent a total of eight seasons with the Kansas City Blues and was the greatest hitter in club history. When the Kansas City Baseball Hall of Fame was created in 1950, Brief was one of three inaugural inductees along with Pat Collins and Eddie Pick.

=== Milwaukee (1925–1928) ===
In December 1924, Brief was traded to the Milwaukee Brewers of the American Association. He played the final four years of his career in Milwaukee. He led the league in home runs in 1925 and 1926. In 1925, he compiled a .358 batting average and a .652 slugging percentage with 37 home runs and 45 doubles. He continued strong in 1926 with a .352 batting average and .585 slugging percentage. His batting average declined to .308 in 1927 and .309 and 26 home runs in 1928. In January 1929, Brief was sold to Nashville of the Southern Association. Brief refused to report to Nashville, and his playing career ended at age 36.

== Later years ==
At the end of his playing career in 1929, Brief returned to his hometown, the resort city of Traverse City, Michigan, where he remained through 1936. He managed the local baseball team and owned and operated a filling station.

In 1936, Brief was hired as an instructor for the Double-A Milwaukee Brewers. In December 1937, the Brewers assigned Brief to manage their Class D affiliate, the Wausau Lumberjacks of the Northern League.

In April 1937, Brief was hired as the director of Milwaukee municipal recreation department's baseball school, providing instruction on the city's playgrounds during the spring and summer. He continued to supervise Milwaukee's boys baseball program from 1937 until his retirement in 1962.

Brief suffered from cancer in his later years. He was hospitalized in late 1960 and underwent surgery. He was hospitalized and underwent surgery for a second time in 1962. He died of cancer in 1963 at age 70 at his home in Milwaukee. He was buried at the Oakwood Cemetery in Traverse City.
