= Eddie Pick =

American baseball player (1899–1967)

- Outfielder, third baseman, shortstop
- Born: May 7, 1899; Attleboro, Massachusetts, U.S.
- Died: May 13, 1967 (aged 68); Santa Monica, California, U.S.
- Batted: Both Threw: Right

MLB debut
- September 10, 1923, for the Cincinnati Reds

Last MLB appearance
- September 7, 1927, for the Chicago Cubs

MLB statistics
- Batting average: .178
- Home runs: 2
- Runs batted in: 17
- Stats at Baseball Reference

Teams
- Cincinnati Reds (1923–1924); Chicago Cubs (1927)

Edgar Everett Pick (May 7, 1899 – May 13, 1967) was an American professional baseball outfielder, third baseman, and shortstop from 1922 to 1933. He played 66 games in Major League Baseball for the Cincinnati Reds (1923–1924) and Chicago Cubs (1927). During his major league career, he compiled a .178 batting average in 191 at bats.

Pick also played ten seasons in the American Association, mostly with the Kansas City Blues (1924–1927, 1930–1931). His best seasons were in Kansas City, including 1925 (.325 batting average, .513 slugging percentage, 24 triples), 1926 (.335 batting average, .522 slugging percentage), 1927 (.359 batting average, .500 slugging percentage), 1931 (.319 batting average, .487 slugging percentage, 58 doubles), and 1932 (.344 batting average, .490 slugging percentage). When the Kansas City Baseball Hall of Fame was created in 1950, Pick was one of three inaugural inductees along with Bunny Brief and Pat Collins.

After his baseball career ended, Pick was employed in the trucking business, serving as vice president of the Riss and Company, Inc., Truck Lines until he retired in 1960. He also served in the military during World War I. After retiring in 1960, he moved to Santa Monica, California. Pick and his wife, Jo, had one daughter. Pick died of cancer at his home in Santa Monica at age 68.
