= Doc Parker =

American baseball player (1872–1941)

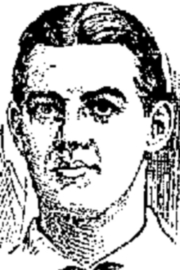
- Pitcher
- Born: June 14, 1872; Theresa, New York, U.S.
- Died: March 3, 1941 (aged 68); Chicago, Illinois, U.S.
- Batted: Right Threw: Right

MLB debut
- July 11, 1893, for the Chicago Colts

Last MLB appearance
- June 21, 1901, for the Cincinnati Reds

MLB statistics
- Win–loss record: 5–8
- Earned run average: 5.90
- Strikeouts: 24
- Stats at Baseball Reference

Teams
- Chicago Colts (1893, 1895–1896); Cincinnati Reds (1901)

Harley Park Parker (June 14, 1872 – March 3, 1941) was an American pitcher in Major League Baseball who played from 1893 through 1901 for the Chicago Colts (1893, 1895–1896) and Cincinnati Reds (1901). Listed at 6 ft 2 in (1.88 m), 200 pounds (91 kg), Parker threw and batted right-handed. He was born in Theresa, New York. His younger brother, Jay Parker, also played in the majors.

In a four-season career, Parker posted a 5–8 record with 24 strikeouts and a 5.90 ERA in 18 appearances, including 14 starts, 13 complete games, one shutout, one save, and 134 1/3 innings of work. Parker was responsible for one of the worst pitching performances in Major League Baseball history. Playing for the Reds against the Brooklyn Superbas on 21 June 1901, Parker gave up 26 hits in the Superbas' 21–3 win. He umpired in the National League during the 1911 season.

Parker died in Chicago, at the age of 68.
