= Art Stewart =

American baseball executive and scout (1927–2021)

- Born: Arthur Stewart; February 6, 1927; Chicago, Illinois, U.S.
- Died: November 11, 2021 (aged 94)
- Occupation: Baseball scout
- Organizations: New York Yankees; Kansas City Royals

Arthur Stewart (February 6, 1927 – November 11, 2021) was an American baseball front-office executive and scout. He began his Major League Baseball (MLB) scouting career with the New York Yankees in 1953. He later joined the Kansas City Royals in 1969, becoming its scouting director in 1984, before serving as senior advisor to the general manager from 1997 until his death.

== Early life ==
Stewart was born in Chicago on February 6, 1927. His father died when he was four years old. Stewart turned down minor league contracts offered by George Sisler and George Moriarty, opting to coach semi-pro baseball instead. Twenty-eight players coached by Stewart eventually signed professional contracts, drawing the attention of the New York Yankees.

== Career ==
=== New York Yankees ===
Stewart was hired as a territorial scout by the Yankees in 1953. He was trained by Yankee scout Lou Maguolo. He scouted, suggested and signed many players for the Yankees. Working as the organization's Midwest scouting supervisor, the first player Stewart discovered and steered to the Yankees was pitcher Jim Bouton, who had not attracted any interest from major league teams while in high school. Bouton eventually played seven seasons with the Yankees and was selected an All Star in 1963, the year when he won 21 games.

=== Kansas City Royals ===
Stewart served in multiple roles for the Kansas City Royals after joining the MLB expansion franchise in 1969. He was appointed as director of scouting in 1984 and served in that capacity until 1997, while having the responsibility of Player Development from 1986 to 1987. He later became the senior special assistant to general manager in 1998, before serving as senior advisor to the general manager until his death. Seventy players that Stewart drafted went on to play in MLB. They include Bo Jackson, Kevin Appier, Brian McRae, Mike Sweeney, Johnny Damon, Joe Randa and Carlos Beltrán.

Stewart was the longest tenured Royals associate at the time of his death, having served 52 seasons with the organization. He was inducted into the Kansas City Royals Baseball Hall of Fame on June 28, 2008, becoming the 23rd member of the elite group. That same year, he was conferred the Midwest Scout of the Year Award by the Scout of the Year Foundation. He was later inducted into the Missouri Sports Hall of Fame as a contributor in 2016.

== Author ==
Stewart co-authored a book, The Art of Scouting, with Kansas City newspaper writer Sam Mellinger in 2014. In an interview with Dick Kaegel of MLB.com on October 17, 2014, as the Royals advanced to their first World Series appearance since 1985, Stewart recounted a story from his Chicago childhood: "When I was 8 or 9 years old, playing ball as a kid, my mother said, 'You know, you're going to be in professional baseball someday.' I said, 'What do you mean, Mom?' She said, 'Because you were born on Feb. 6, Babe Ruth's birthday, in 1927, the same year that he hit 60 home runs.' She was right. Talk about scouting!"

== Personal life ==
Stewart married his first wife, Donna Wakely, during the 1960s. They met at a baseball game while he was scouting and remained married for almost 50 years until her death in 2008. Together, they had one child, Dawn. He later married Rosemary, to whom he was originally engaged to in 1959. They reunited at the Lutheran church in his hometown where they had first met almost 50 years before. They resided in Racine, Wisconsin, during his later years and remained married until his death. He died on November 11, 2021, at the age of 94.
