= Al Platte =

American baseball player (1890–1976)

- Outfielder
- Born: April 13, 1890; Grand Rapids, Michigan, U.S.
- Died: August 29, 1976 (aged 86); Grand Rapids, Michigan, U.S.
- Batted: Left Threw: Left

MLB debut
- September 1, 1913, for the Detroit Tigers

Last MLB appearance
- September 18, 1913, for the Detroit Tigers

Minor league statistics
- Games: 1,755
- Hits: 1,983
- Batting average: .313
- Stats at Baseball Reference

Teams
- Detroit Tigers (1913)

Alfred Frederick Joseph Platte (April 13, 1890 – August 29, 1976) was an American baseball player. He played professional baseball for 17 years from 1910 to 1926, including nine games in Major League Baseball with the Detroit Tigers during their 1913 season. He appeared in 1,755 minor league baseball games between 1910 and 1926 and had 1,983 hits for a .313 batting average.

== Early years ==
Platte was born in Grand Rapids, Michigan, in 1890.

== Professional baseball ==
Platte began his professional baseball career playing for the Cadillac Chiefs in the Michigan State League from 1910 to 1912. He compiled batting averages of .339 in 1911 and .346 in 1912.

He advanced to the International League, playing for the Providence Grays from 1912 to 1914. He compiled a .306 batting average in 1913. At the end of the 1913 season, Platte played for the Detroit Tigers. He made his major league debut on September 1 and appeared in his last major league game on September 18. He appeared in nine games, five as the backup left fielder, and the rest as a pinch-hitter and pinch-runner, and compiled a .111 career batting average. He returned to Providence in 1914 and compiled a .318 average with 23 triples in 597 at bats.

Platte continued to play in the minor leagues until 1926, including stints with the Louisville Colonels (1915-1917), Chattanooga Lookouts (1917), Kansas City Blues (1918), Omaha Rourkes (1920), and Peoria Tractors (1921-1926). His best season was 1922 when he appeared in 124 games for Peoria in the Three-Eye League and compiled a .369 batting average with 59 extra base hits, including 23 triples.

== Later years ==
Platte died in 1976 at age 86 in Grand Rapids, Michigan.
