= West Michigan League =

Former baseball league in Michigan

- Classification: Class D (1910)
- Sport: Minor League Baseball
- First season: May 28, 1910
- Folded: September 3, 1910
- Replaced by: Michigan State League
- President: Thomas Jones (1910)
- No. of teams: 6
- Country: United States of America
- Most titles: 1 Cadillac Chiefs (1910)

The West Michigan League was an early 20th century minor league that included baseball teams in the western part of Michigan. The league expanded and was then renamed the Michigan State League for the 1911 season. Among the league's teams were the Traverse City Resorters, which folded after the 1914 season, the Cadillac Chiefs, Holland Wooden Shoes, and Muskegon Speed Boys.

== Standings & statistics ==
=== 1910 West Michigan League standings ===
Team standings	W	L	PCT	GB	Managers
Cadillac Chiefs	53	42	.558	0	Calvin Wenger
Traverse City Resorters	50	45	.526	.5	Henry Collett / Pat Thacker
Muskegon Speed Boys	48	48	.500	5.5	Arthur DeBaker
Holland Wooden Shoes	40	56	.417	13.5	Charles Doyle / Emerson Dickerson / Clyde McNutt

No Playoff Scheduled.

1910 player statistics
Player	Team	Stat	Tot	Player	Team	Stat	Tot
Martin Kubiak	Cadillac	BA	.378	Harry Gerloski	Cadillac	W	18
Frank Wittowski	Cadillac	Runs	85	La Rue Kirby	Traverse City	SO	150
Frank Wittowski	Cadillac	Hits	114	Harry Gerloski	Cadillac	Pct	.720; 18-7
Martin Kubiak	Cadillac	HR	5				
