= Michigan State League =

- Classification: Independent (1889–1890, 1895, 1897); Class D (1902, 1911–1914); Class B (1926); Class C (1940–1941)
- Sport: Minor League Baseball
- First season: 1889
- Folded: 1941
- President: M. H. Ford (1889); D. Z. Curtis (1889); Orlando F. Barnes (1890); Walter H. Mumby (1895, 1897); G.E. Morrison (1902); Emerson Dickerson (1911–1914); Thomas J. Halligan (1926, 1940–1941)
- No. of teams: 22
- Country: United States of America
- Most titles: 3 Manistee
- Related competitions: Central League; West Michigan League; Michigan–Ontario League

The Michigan State League was a minor league baseball league that operated in various seasons between 1889 and 1941. The league franchises were based exclusively in Michigan, with the league forming on six occasions. Twenty two cities hosted teams in the Michigan State league.

== History ==
Five of the six Michigan State League incarnations operated only one or two baseball seasons and the other four seasons. Jointly they covered eleven baseball seasons from 1889 to 1941.

The first two Michigan State Leagues, 1889–1890 and 1895, predated the establishment of present-day Minor League Baseball, an umbrella organization of minor leagues. The third was a "Class D" league during 1902 only, the first season for the organized minors.

In 1911, the West Michigan League expanded and became the fourth Michigan State League as a "Class D" minor league through 1914.

In 1926, the Michigan–Ontario League merged with the Central League to form the fifth MSL, which played only the one season.

The sixth Michigan State League operated in 1940 and 1941.

== Cities represented ==
- Adrian, Michigan: Adrian Reformers 1895
- Battle Creek, Michigan: Battle Creek Adventists 1895; Battle Creek Cero Frutos 1902
- Bay City, Michigan: Bay City 1897; Bay City Wolves 1926
- Belding, Michigan: Belding Champs 1914
- Boyne City, Michigan: Boyne City Boosters 1911–1914
- Cadillac, Michigan: Cadillac Chiefs 1910–1914
- Charlotte, Michigan: Charlotte Giants 1926
- Flint, Michigan: Flint Flyers 1889–1890; Flint 1897, 1902; Flint Vehicles 1926; Flint Gems 1940; Flint Arrows 1941
- Grand Rapids, Michigan: Grand Rapids 1889–1890; Grand Rapids Colts 1902; Grand Rapids Black Sox 1926; Grand Rapids Dodgers 1940; Grand Rapids Colts 1941
- Greenville, Michigan: Greenville 1889
- Holland, Michigan: Holland Wooden Shoes 1910–1911
- Jackson, Michigan: Jackson Jaxons 1889, 1895; Jackson 1897, Jackson White Sox 1902
- Kalamazoo, Michigan: Kalamazoo Kazoos 1889; Kalamazoo Celery Eaters 1895; Kalamazoo 1897; Kalamazoo Celery Pickers 1926
- Lansing, Michigan: Lansing Farmers 1889–1890; Lansing Senators 1895, 1897, 1902, 1941; Lansing Lancers 1940
- Ludington, Michigan: Ludington Mariners 1912–1914; Ludington Tars 1926
- Manistee, Michigan: Manistee 1890; Manistee Colts 1911; Manistee Champs 1912–1914
- Muskegon, Michigan: Muskegon 1890; Muskegon Speed Boys 1910; Muskegon Speeders 1912–1914; Muskegon Reds 1902, 1911, 1926, 1940–1941
- Owosso, Michigan: Owosso Colts 1895
- Port Huron, Michigan: Port Huron 1890; Port Huron Marines 1895; Port Huron 1897; Port Huron Saints 1926
- Saginaw, Michigan: Saginaw 1889; Saginaw Lumbermen 1897; Saginaw Aces 1926; Saginaw Athletics 1940; Saginaw White Sox 1902, 1941
- St. Joseph, Michigan: St. Joseph Autos 1940–1941
- Traverse City, Michigan: Traverse City Resorters 1910–1914

== Standings and statistics ==
=== 1889 to 1890 ===
1889 Michigan State League

Team standings	W	L	PCT	GB	Managers
Saginaw*	59	40	.586	2	Louis Williams / John Murphy
Jackson Jaxons	60	37	.619	—	James Tray
Grand Rapids Shamrocks	53	44	.546	7	John Roushkolb / Harry Smith / Edward Eagan
Lansing Farmers	42	56	.429	18½	Walter Mumby
Greenville	42	58	.400	19½	John Foster
Kalamazoo Kazoos / Flint Flyers	38	59	.392	22	James Lombard

Kalamazoo (32–42) moved to Flint September 3.
Jackson and Saginaw finished the regular season in a virtual tie for first place, Jackson played make-up games to gain enough victories to finish in first place. Saginaw protested and league President Curtis awarded the championship to Saginaw.

Player statistics
Player	Team	Stat	Tot	Player	Team	Stat	Tot
Joe Katz	Greenville	BA	.364				
Joe Katz	Greenville	Hits	154				
Fred Popkay	Jackson	Runs	109				
Joe Katz	Greenville	HR	14				

1890 Michigan State League
schedule

Team standings	W	L	PCT	GB	Managers
Grand Rapids Shamrocks	17	8	.680	—	Edward Eagan
Manistee	16	8	.667	½	John Murphy
Flint Flyers	13	10	.565	3	J. A. Sanford
Port Huron	11	14	.440	6	Joe Walsh
Muskegon	10	14	.417	6	John Roushkolb
Lansing Farmers	4	17	.190	11	C. A. Briggs

Grand Rapids left to join the International League June 12
The league disbanded June 13.

=== 1895 ===
1895 Michigan State League
schedule

Team standings	W	L	PCT	GB	Managers
Adrian Demons	57	30	.655	—	R.G. Taylor
Lansing Senators	56	36	.609	3½	R.N. Parshall / Alfred Manassau
Kalamazoo Kazoos	50	41	.549	9	E. F. Mayo / Oliver Hungerford
Battle Creek Adventists / Jackson Jaxons	36	53	.404	22	Mittenhal / Todd / Leigh Lynch
Owosso Colts	34	47	.420	NA	Fred Craves / Frank Wickine
Port Huron Marines	27	51	.346	NA	Joe Walsh / George Brown / Charles Schaub / Boocher

Owosso and Port Huron disbanded September 3; Battle Creek (14–40) moved to Jackson August 8

Player statistics
Player	Team	Stat	Tot	Player	Team	Stat	Tot
Jack Daly	Lansing	BA	.397	George Wilson	Adrian	W	29
Jack Daly	Lansing	Runs	124	George Wilson	Adrian	PCT	.879; 29–4
Jack Daly	Lansing	Hits	143				
Jack Daly	Lansing	HR	25				
M. H. Justice	Adrian	SB	65				

=== 1897 ===
1897 Michigan State League

Team standings	W	L	PCT	GB	Managers
Bay City	42	38	.525	—	Jay Faatz
Saginaw Lumbermen	38	43	.469	4½	George Black / William Phillips
Port Huron	29	42	.408	8½	Gobel / D. McCarron
Kalamazoo Celery Eaters/ Flint	32	51	.386	11½	Fred Popkay / E.F. Mayo
Jackson	46	23	.667	NA	Lefty Davis / Charlie Cushman
Lansing Senators	41	31	.569	NA	Thomas Robinson

Kalamazoo (23–41) moved to Flint July 12; Jackson disbanded July 20; Lansing disbanded July 27
The league disbanded August 16

=== 1902 ===
1902 Michigan State League
schedule

Team standings	W	L	PCT	GB	Managers
Battle Creek Cero Frutos	53	31	.631	—	Jacob Weickgenant / W.E. Woods
Saginaw White Sox/ Jackson White Sox	50	39	.562	5½	Doggie Miller
Flint	47	41	.534	8	Arlie Latham / Ed Zimran
Muskegon Reds	40	47	.460	14½	Arthur DeBaker
Lansing Senators	35	62	.361	24½	H.A. Bowie / Walter Niles
Grand Rapids Colts	29	34	.460	NA	Emerson Dickerson

Saginaw (35–28) moved to Jackson July 20.; Grand Rapids disbanded July 20; Lansing disbanded August 20, causing the league to fold.

=== 1911 to 1914 ===
1911 Michigan State League
schedule

Team standings	W	L	PCT	GB	Managers
Manistee Colts	74	45	.622	—	Ed R. Somerlott / Earl Zook / Connie Lewis
Cadillac Chiefs	73	45	.619	½	Calvin Wenger
Traverse City Resorters	62	56	.525	11½	William Hawker / Henry Collett
Holland Wooden Shoes	48	71	.403	26	Clyde McNutt / Ted Penfold / Ed McDonough / W. Schaefer
Boyne City Boosters	24	92	.207	48½	Peter Partlow / Jack Ryan / Partlow / Lou Criger

Player statistics
Player	Team	Stat	Tot	Player	Team	Stat	Tot
Earl Comstock	Muskegon	BA	.354	Ray Williams	Manistee	W	25
Otto Pfeifer	Traverse City	Runs	120	Ray Williams	Manistee	SO	169
Bunny Brief	Traverse City	Hits	169	Ray Williams	Manistee	PCT	.833; 25–5
Bunny Brief	Traverse City	HR	10				
Otto Pfeifer	Traverse City	SB	85				

1912 Michigan State League

Team standings	W	L	PCT	GB	Managers
Manistee Champs	83	35	.703	—	Connie Lewis
Traverse City Resorters	79	40	.664	4½	James Hamilton
Ludington Mariners	60	59	.504	23½	Frank Warrender / Claude Stark
Boyne City Boosters	50	69	.420	33½	Bo Slear
Muskegon Speeders	48	70	.407	35	Art DeBaker
Cadillac Chiefs	35	82	.299	47½	Calvin Wenger / Tom Railing

Player statistics
Player	Team	Stat	Tot	Player	Team	Stat	Tot
Al Platte	Cadillac	BA	.367	Omer Benn	Manistee	W	22
Carl Jones	Manistee	Runs	80	Al Bowman	Muskegon	SO	213
Bunny Brief	Traverse City	Hits	152	La Rue Kirby	Traverse City	PCT	.857; 18–3
Bunny Brief	Traverse City	HR	13				
Al Platte	Cadillac	SB	42				

1913 Michigan State League

Team standings	W	L	PCT	GB	Managers
Manistee Champs	73	47	.608	—	Connie Lewis
Traverse City Resorters	62	57	.521	10½	Jack Pendry / James Hamilton / Carl Wenger
Muskegon Speeders	61	59	.508	12	Peg Bemis / Sandy Murray
Boyne City Boosters	57	63	.475	16	Grover Gillen
Cadillac Chiefs	53	66	.445	19½	Homer Warner
Ludington Mariners	53	67	.442	20	Bob Grogran / Harry Arndt

Player statistics
Player	Team	Stat	Tot	Player	Team	Stat	Tot
Sid Miller	Muskegon	BA	.359	Babe Roberts	Boyne City	W	18
Pete Allison	Cadillac	Runs	84	John Radloff	Manistee	W	18
Bill Varley	Boyne City	Runs	84	John Radloff	Manistee	SO	235
Carl Dunckel	Muskegon	Runs	84	Henry Negake	Muskegon	PCT	.750; 9–3
Pete Allison	Cadillac	Hits	157				
Grover Prough	Manistee	HR	14				

1914 Michigan State League

Team standings	W	L	PCT	GB	Managers
Muskegon Speeders	73	46	.613	—	Sandy Murray
Ludington Mariners	69	50	.580	4	Bob Grogan / Jim Sager
Cadillac Chiefs	67	51	.568	5½	Jay Parker
Manistee / Belding Champs	57	64	.471	17	Louis Haidt
Boyne City Boosters	48	51	.485	NA	Grover Gillen
Traverse City Resorters	22	74	.229	NA	Leo Speer / Carl Wenger / Harry Kunkel

Traverse City and Boyne City both withdrew September 1; Manistee (56–51) was expelled and the franchise moved to Belding September 9

Player statistics
Player	Team	Stat	Tot	Player	Team	Stat	Tot
Gil Patterson	TrCity/Manis/Bel	BA	.314	Neal Leifers	Muskegon	W	25
Raleigh Baum	Cadillac	Runs	86	Neal Leifers	Muskegon	SO	194
Raleigh Baum	Cadillac	Hits	138	Neal Liefers	Muskegon	PCT	.758; 25–8
Carl Tennant	Ludington	HR	7				

=== 1926 ===
1926 Michigan State League
schedule

Team standings	W	L	PCT	GB	Managers
Bay City Wolves	64	30	.681	—	Bob Prysock
Port Huron Saints	56	38	.596	8	Johnny Carlin
Saginaw Aces	55	41	.573	10	Les Nunamaker
Grand Rapids Black Sox	51	43	.543	13	Jess Runser / Pat Devereaux
Ludington Tars	45	51	.469	20	Ovid Nicholson
Muskegon Reds	39	56	.411	25½	Buck Wheat
Kalamazoo Celery Pickers	39	59	.398	27	Boss Schmidt / George Hutton
Flint Vehicles / Charlotte Giants	32	63	.337	32½	Ray Dunn

The league was created June 15 by the mid-season merger of the Central League and Michigan-Ontario League. Flint (18–26) moved to Charlotte July 22.

Player statistics
Player	Team	Stat	Tot	Player	Team	Stat	Tot
Dan Beal	Ludington	BA	.375	Saraphin Good	Bay City	W	19
Al Bashang	Bay City	Runs	107	Sid Dyer	Saginaw	SO	148
Dan Beal	Ludington	Hits	134	Saraphin Good	Bay City	PCT	.826; 19–4
Harry Green	Kalamazoo	HR	11				

=== 1940 to 1941 ===
1940 Michigan State League

Team standings	W	L	PCT	GB	Managers
Flint Gems	67	41	.620	—	Jack Knight
Saginaw Athletics	53	48	.525	10½	Dallas Avery / Hank Camelli
St. Joseph Autos	52	51	.505	12½	Conrad Fisher / Elmer Kirchoff
Grand Rapids Dodgers	50	56	.472	16	Burleigh Grimes
Muskegon Reds	49	57	.462	17	Jack Tighe
Lansing Lancers	44	62	.415	22	Jesse Altenburg

Playoffs: Saginaw 3 games, Grand Rapids 1; St. Joseph 3 games, Flint 2
Finals cancelled due to inclement weather

Player statistics
Player	Team	Stat	Tot	Player	Team	Stat	Tot
Robert Ogle	Grand Rapids	BA	.374	Vernon Kohler	Flint	W	18
Elmer Sidlo	Flint	Runs	109	Suvern Wright	Saginaw	SO	159
Robert Ogle	Grand Rapids	Hits	171	Clarence Gann	Muskegon	ERA	2.80
Jerry Burmeister	Lansing	RBI	86	Herb Norquist	St. Joseph	PCT	.846; 11–2
Joe Wojey	Grand Rapids	HR	20				

1941 Michigan State League

Team standings	W	L	PCT	GB	Managers
Flint Indians	70	38	.648	—	Jack Knight
St. Joseph Autos	64	50	.561	9	Elmer Kirchoff
Grand Rapids Colts	59	55	.518	14	Red Lucas
Muskegon Reds	61	57	.517	14	Jack Tighe
Saginaw White Sox	51	62	.451	21½	Bill Prince / Walden McMullen
Lansing Senators	35	78	.310	37½	Danny Taylor / Russ Wein

No Playoffs Scheduled

Player statistics
Player	Team	Stat	Tot	Player	Team	Stat	Tot
Gene Woodling	Flint	BA	.394	Frank Schulz	Flint	W	17
Johnny Lipon	Muskegon	Runs	126	Tom Hamill	Grand Rapids	SO	188
Johnny Lipon	Muskegon	Hits	176	Steve Gromek	Flint	ERA	2.90
Johnny Lipon	Muskegon	RBI	115	Steve Gromek	Flint	PCT	.875 14–2
Norm Snyder	St. Joseph	RBI	115				
Johnny Lipon	Muskegon	HR	35				

== Hall of Fame alumni ==
- Burleigh Grimes, 1940 Grand Rapids Dodgers, MGR
- Honus Wagner, 1895 Adrian Demons

== Sources ==
- The Encyclopedia of Minor League Baseball, and Third Editions.
