= Flint Gems =

The Flint Gems were a minor league professional baseball team in Flint, Michigan in 1940. The Gems were part of the class C Michigan State League, and played their home games at Atwood Stadium. During the single season the team played in Flint, the Cleveland Indians-affiliated Gems were managed by Jack Knight and they held a first place record of 67-41. The team eventually lost in the first round of the MSL playoffs to the Saint Joseph Autos, 3 games to 2. After the conclusion of the 1940 season, the Gems were renamed Flint Indians and the team would play one more year prior to the dismantlement of the Michigan State League.
