= Ludington Mariners =

Class D minor league baseball team

The Ludington Mariners (official name: Ludington Mariner Base Ball Club) were a professional Class D minor league baseball team from Ludington, Michigan. Their home field was located in Culver Park.

The team was formed in 1912 as part of the Michigan State League and played until 1914 when they took a five-year hiatus during World War I. They returned to join the Central League in 1920 until 1922. They returned, briefly, in 1926 as the Ludington Tars.

The team name would be resurrected in 1993 as the Ludington Mariners Old Time Base Ball Team, a team that plays by the 1860 rules as "50% historical reenactment, and 50% real competition."
