= Traverse City Resorters =

Defunct minor league baseball team in Traverse City, Michigan

Information
- League: West Michigan League, Michigan State League
- Location: Traverse City, Michigan
- Ballpark: Bowers Harbor Ball Park
- Founded: 1910
- Folded: 1914
- League championships: 0

The Traverse City Resorters were a professional minor league baseball team located in Traverse City, Michigan, United States, playing in the Class D Michigan State League and the precursor West Michigan League from 1910 to 1914. The Resorters played at the Bowers Harbor Ball Park on Old Mission Peninsula.

== History ==
The Traverse City Resorters played five seasons of minor league baseball. The club began play in 1910 in what was called the West Michigan League and finished 50–45 that season, a half game behind the league champion Cadillac Chiefs. Pitcher LaRue Kirby had 13 wins and led the league with 150 strikeouts. The league expanded in 1911, was renamed the Michigan State League, and the Resorters finished in 4th place with a 62–56 record, despite featuring two future big leaguers in Kirby and Bunny Brief, with a league leading 10 home runs and 97 runs.

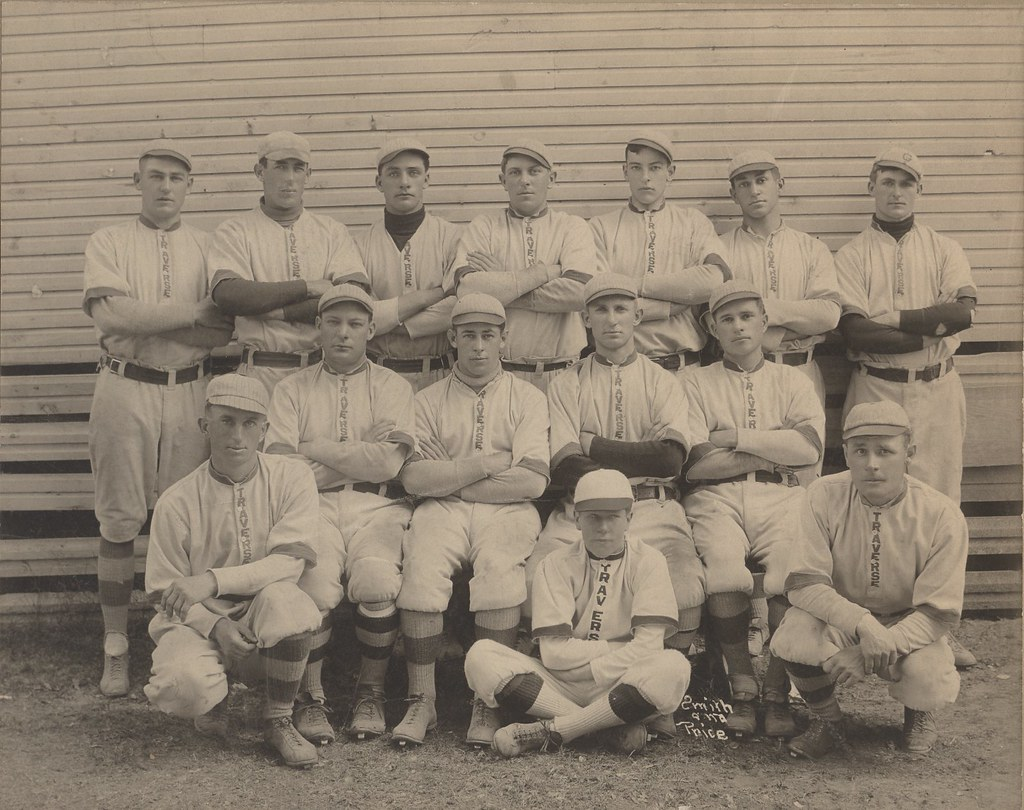
1912 Traverse City Resorters

James Hamilton took over as manager for Traverse City in 1912, and the club finished 2nd with a 79–40 record. Bunny Brief hit .353 and led the league with 13 home runs, LaRue Kirby won 18 games, and both advanced to Major League Baseball that season. The 1912 Resorters also featured Jim Riley and Ernie Krueger, both of whom would also reach the major leagues. The team finished second again in 1913, but with a 22–74 record in 1914, the team withdrew from the league on September 1, did not finish the league season, and folded operations. Professional baseball did not return to Traverse City until 2006 when the Traverse City Beach Bums of the independent Frontier League began play.

== Notable alumni ==
The Resorters featured several players during their existence who would go on to Major League Baseball teams, including Bunny Brief, who played with the St. Louis Browns, Chicago White Sox, and Pittsburgh Pirates; Katsy Keifer, who advanced to the Indianapolis Hoosiers of the third major-league, the Federal League in 1914; LaRue Kirby, who played for the New York Giants and St. Louis Terriers; Ernie Krueger, who played for the Cleveland Naps, New York Yankees, New York Giants, Brooklyn Robins, and Cincinnati Reds; and Jim Riley, who played for the Boston Doves.

== Season-by-season results ==
| Year | League | W–L | Win % | Place | League champion |
|---|---|---|---|---|---|
| 1910 | West Michigan League | 50–45 | .526 | 2nd | Cadillac Chiefs |
| 1911 | Michigan State League | 62–56 | .525 | 4th | Manistee Colts |
| 1912 | Michigan State League | 79–40 | .664 | 2nd | Manistee Champs |
| 1913 | Michigan State League | 62–57 | .521 | 2nd | Manistee Champs |
| 1914 | Michigan State League | 22–74 | .229 | 6th | Muskegon Speeders |
