= Jay Parker =

American baseball player (1874–1935)

- Pitcher
- Born: July 8, 1874; Theresa, New York
- Died: June 8, 1935 (aged 60); Hartford, Michigan
- Batted: Left Threw: Right

MLB debut
- September 27, 1899, for the Pittsburgh Pirates

Last MLB appearance
- September 27, 1899, for the Pittsburgh Pirates

MLB statistics
- Pitching record: 0-0
- Earned run average: INF
- Strikeouts: 0

Teams
- Pittsburgh Pirates (1899)

Jay Parker (July 8, 1874 – June 8, 1935) was a starting pitcher who played briefly for the Pittsburgh Pirates during the 1899 season. Listed at 5 ft 11 in (1.80 m), 185 lb., Parker batted left-handed and threw right-handed. He was born in Theresa, New York. His older brother, Doc Parker, also pitched in the majors.

Little is known about this player on a Pirates uniform. Parker was 25 years old when he entered the majors on September 27, 1899 with Pittsburgh, starting against the Chicago Orphans. His performance that afternoon at West Side Park, reduced to the bare essentials, matching his career totals: three batters, hit one, walked two, and gave up two earned runs, without making an out to have an undefined ERA. It is sometimes incorrectly displayed as zero or as the lowest ranking ERA when it is more akin to the highest. He played through 1905, but never appeared in a major-league game again.

He had brief stints as a manager in the minor leagues in 1904 and 1914.

Parker died in Hartford, Michigan, at the age of 60.
