= Flint Indians =

The Flint Indians were a professional baseball team in Flint, Michigan in 1941. The Indians were a part of the Michigan State League and played their home games at Atwood Stadium. Their overall record was 70-38 and they won the 1941 MSL Championship. The Indians and the rest of the Michigan State League folded after the 1941 season due to the United States' entry into World War II.

A notable player from the 1941 Indians was pitcher Steve Gromek, who went on to play 17 years in the big leagues with the Cleveland Indians and Detroit Tigers. Gromek was named to one of the 100 Greatest Cleveland Indians in 2001.
