= Kalamazoo Celery Pickers =

- 1895–1926; (1887–1889, 1895, 1897, 1906–1915, 1920–1924, 1926); Kalamazoo, Michigan

Minor league affiliations
- Class: Independent (1887–1889); Class D (1897, 1906–1910, 1913); Class C (1911–1912, 1914, 1941); Class B (1895, 1920–1922)
- League: Ohio State League (1887); Tri State League (1888); Michigan State League (1889, 1895, 1897); Southern Michigan League (1906–1914); Central League (1920-1922); Michigan-Ontario League (1923–1924); Central League (1926); Michigan State League (1926)

Major league affiliations
- Team: None

Minor league titles
- League titles (4): 1887; 1910; 1911; 1926
- Wild card berths (0): None

Team data
- Name: Kalamazoo Kazoos (1887–1889, 1909–1910, 1913–1914, 1924); Kalamazoo Celery Pickers (1895, 1897, 1911–1912, 1920–1923, 1926); Kalamazoo White Sox (1906–1908)
- Ballpark: Wheaton Avenue Grounds (1887–1888); North Street Park (1889, 1895, 1897); Riverview Park (1906–1915); Stationery Park (1920–1924, 1926)

The Kalamazoo Celery Pickers were a minor league baseball team based in Kalamazoo, Michigan.

Between 1887 and 1926, Kalamazoo teams played in six separate leagues, joining two leagues twice. Kalamazoo teams played as members of the Ohio State League (1887), Tri State League (1888), Michigan State League (1889, 1895, 1897), Southern Michigan League (1906–1914), Central League (1920-1922), Michigan-Ontario League (1923–1924), with a final season as members of both the Central League (1926) and Michigan State League (1926). The Kalamazoo teams played intermittently known as the "Kazoos" and "Celery Pickers" and three seasons known as the "White Sox." Kalamazoo teams won league championships in 1887, 1910, 1911 and 1926.

Kalamazoo hosted minor league home games at four ballparks: Wheaton Avenue Grounds (1895, 1897, 1902), North Street Park (1906–1915) Riverview Park (1906–1914) and Stationery Park (1920–1924, 1926)

== History ==
=== Beginnings 1887 & 1888 ===
During the early months of 1886, the "Kalamazoo Base Ball Association" was organized, with the intention of forming a baseball team in the city. The association accumulated $5,000 in capital stock. Future manager A.W. Murphy was a part of the association, as were Oliver G. Hungerford, and William A. Doyle. Doyle and Hungerford were both local business leaders and still active baseball players who spearheaded an effort to build a ballpark in Kalamazoo. Their efforts were successful when the Wheaton Avenue Grounds were established to host the Kalamazoo team, who played in 1886 as a semi-professional team with local players.

Oliver Hungerford became the principal owner of the Kalamazoo team, which joined the Ohio State League for the 1887 season. A.C. "Al" Buckenberger, a third baseman from Detroit, was hired as the Kalamazoo player/manager. The local players from 1886 were replaced by professional players signed by Hungerford and Buckenberger.

In their first season of minor league play, the 1887 Kalamazoo "Kazoos" became charter members of the independent level Ohio State League and won the league championship. The Akron Acorns, Columbus Buckeyes, Mansfield, Sandusky Suds, Steubenville Stubs, Wheeling Nail Cities and Zanesville Kickapoos teams joined Kalamazoo in beginning league play on May 2, 1887.

With a record of 73–34, the Kazoos finished the 1887 season in first place in the eight-team league, playing the season under manager Al Buckenberger. Kalamazoo finished 13.5 games ahead of the second place Zanesville Kickapoos as the Ohio State League held no playoffs. Kalamazoo pitcher Mother Watson won 29 games to lead the Ohio State League and teammate Bill Irwin had a league leading 283 strikeouts. Ed Stapleton hit 12 home runs and scored 121 runs, tops in the league in both categories. Following the 1887 Ohio State League season, Kalamazoo also defeated a team from Indianapolis for a mythical "State" title.

The Ohio State League changed names in 1888, and Kalamazoo continued play in the newly named league, becoming charter members of the ten-team Tri-State League. The Kalamazoo Kazoos disbanded before the end of the 1888 Tri-State League season. On September 4, 1888, the Kazoos disbanded having posted a 62–37 record at the time the team folded. Kalamazoo played under managers Tip O'Neill and A.W. Murphy. After folding in 1888, Kalamazoo continued play in another league in 1889.

=== Michigan State League 1889, 1895, 1897 ===
In 1889, Kalamazoo continued minor league play and became charter members of a new league. The Kazoos began the season as charter members of the Michigan State League, before relocating during the season. On September 3, 1889, Kalamazoo (32–42) moved to Flint, Michigan and ended the season playing as the Flint Flyers. The Kazoos/Flyers team finished last in the standings with overall record of 38–59, ending the season in sixth place in the six-team league. Managed by James Lombard and Tim Manning, the Kazoos/Flyers finished 22.0 games behind the first place Jackson Jaxons in the final standings. Flint continued Michigan State League play in 1890 before the league folded.

After the folding of the Kalamazoo minor league team following the move to Flint, Kalamazoo owner Oliver Hungerford became owner of a chain of billiard halls in Kalamazoo, which he operated for many years.

In 1895, minor league baseball returned to Kalamazoo. Partnering in the team formation were Edward "Eddie" Mayo who had organized independent teams in Kalamazoo from 1890 to 1894 with support from Sam Folz, owner of the Folz’ Excelsior clothing store in Kalamazoo. Mayo became manager of the team and Folz continued as owner. Oliver Hungerford returned as team secretary. Together, Mayo and Hungerford signed a roster of players for the 1895 season.

After five seasons, Kalamazoo resumed minor league play, joining as their former league reformed. The Kalamazoo "Celery Pickers" joined the reformed Class B level Michigan State League. The Adrian Reformers, Battle Creek Adventists, Jackson Jaxons, Lansing Senators, Owosso Colts and Port Huron Marines teams joined with Kalamazoo in beginning league play.

On May 30, 1895, the Battle Creek Adventists came to Kalamazoo for the opening game at North Street Park. It was reported in the local paper that “Every seat in the grandstand was taken, and there were at least a hundred carriages and buggies on the ‘foul’ ground, beside a large congregation that was compelled to stand.”

The 1895 Kalamazoo team was known as the "Celery Pickers" for the first time and ended the season with a record of 55–41. Kalamazoo placed third in the Michigan State League, playing the season under manager Ed Mayo. Kalamazoo finished 9.0 games behind the first place Adrian Demons who had Baseball Hall of Fame members Bud Fowler and Honus Wagner on their roster during the season.

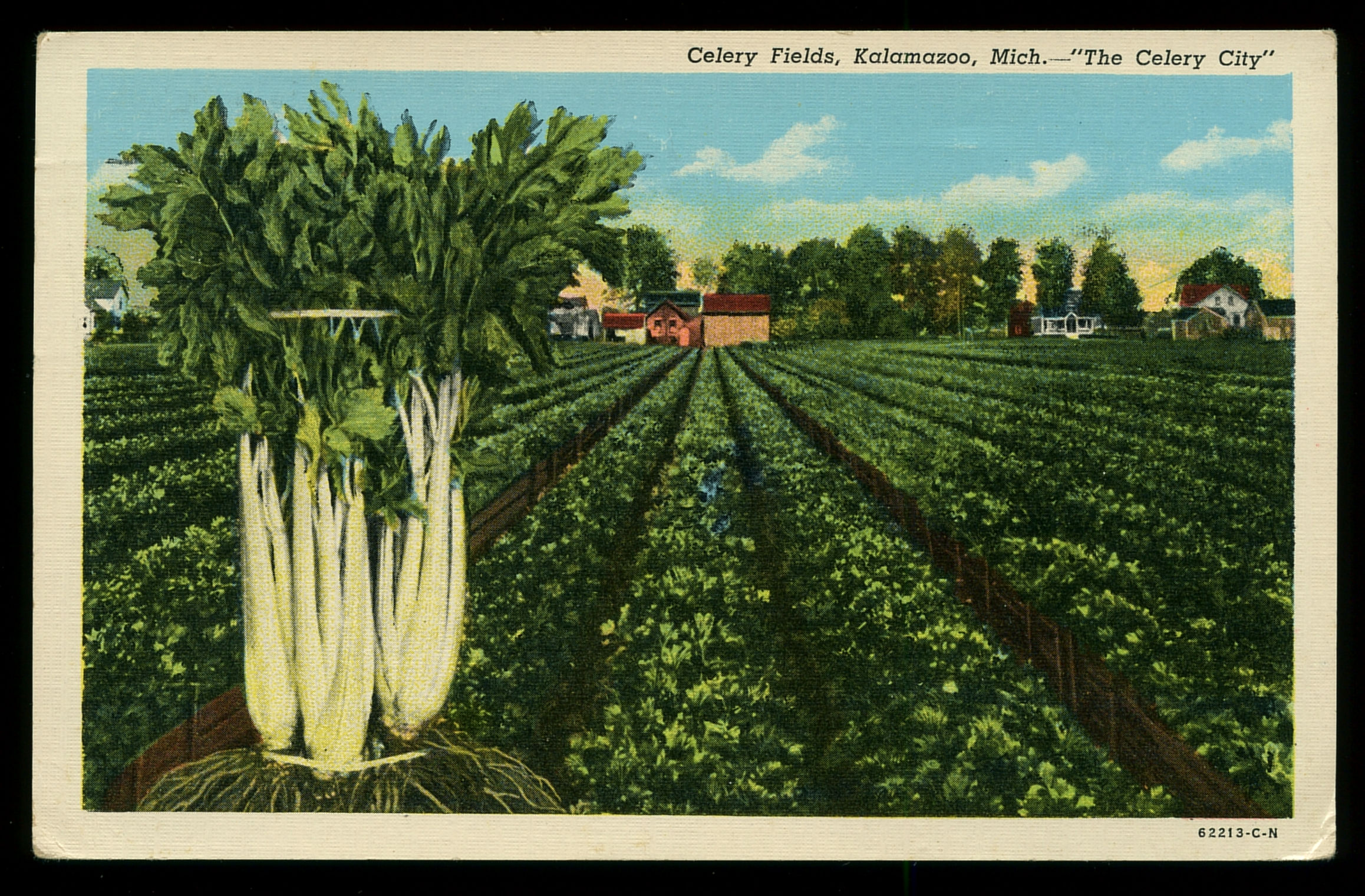
(1945) Celery Fields of Kalamazoo, Michigan - Postcard

The "Celery Pickers" nickname corresponds to local history and agriculture. Kalamazoo was known as "Celery City" in the era. With hospitable natural soil and a natural crop, the celery industry began in Kalamazoo in the 1850s, with railroads and local packaging facilities complimenting the celery growing production, The celery industry eventually faltered in Kalamazoo. Today, there is a historical marker with the heading "Kalamazoo Celery" and an inscription, located at South Pine Street and Balch Street in Kalamazoo.

The Michigan State League did not return to minor league play in 1896 and Kalamazoo again hosted a local semiprofessional team run by Mayo and Folz.

In 1897, the Michigan State League reformed with Kalamazoo as a member, before relocating to Flint during the season. On July 12, 1897, the Kalamazoo team moved to Flint for a second time in their history, with a record of 23–41 on the date of the move. On August 16, 1897, the Michigan State League folded, with the Bay City team in first place and Kalamazoo/Flint in last place of the four remaining teams. The Kalamazoo/Flint team ended the season with an overall record of 32–51, as Fred Popkay and Ed Mayo served as the managers between the two locations.

=== Southern Michigan League 1906 to 1915 ===
In hopes of forming a new minor league team in Kalamazoo, the "Kalamazoo Baseball Association" was formed in 1905 to gauge community support. A new Kalamazoo team was formed, nicknamed the Kalamazoo "White Sox." Former Chicago boxing promoter E.J. Ryan was appointed as the team manager, H.D. Kools, team president; and Clarence Pickell as secretary and treasurer.

On February 19, 1906, the National Commission awarded the Michigan cities of Kalamazoo and Jackson to the newly formed Southern Michigan League, after the existing Interstate League had first put in a claim on the Kalamazoo franchise to be assigned to that league.

Kalamazoo began a nine-season tenure of the Southern Michigan League in 1906. The six–team Class D level Southern Michigan League, also called the "Southern Michigan Association" was formed for the 1906 season. The Battle Creek Crickets, Jackson Convicts, Mount Clemens Bathers, Saginaw and Tecumseh Indians teams joined the Kalamazoo "White Sox" as charter members.

Just before the 1906 season, E.J. Ryan, who had earlier been appointed as the White Sox manager, was replaced as the Kalamazoo manager by Clarence Picknell.

In May 1906, the White Sox opened Riverside Park, with a 6–0 home victory over a Grand Rapids team.

In their first season in the newly formed league, the Kalamazoo White Sox placed second in the 1906 Southern Michigan League. Managed by Clarence Pickell and Red Killefer, the White Sox finished 6.5 games behind the first place Mount Clemens Bathers, with a 63–41 final record.

In 1907, the Kalamazoo White Sox continued play. The Southern Michigan League became a Class B level league after it expanded to become an eight-team league, adding the Lansing Senators and Flint Vehicles teams to the league. With a record of 62–47, Kalamazoo finished in second place and played the season under manager Maurice Myers. The White Sox ended the season 6.0 games behind the first place Tecumseh Indians. Tecumseh won the league championship after the league played the remainder of the season with seven teams after Jackson folded during the season.

The Kalamazoo White Sox continued play in the 1908 Southern Michigan League and finished as the runner up for the third consecutive season. The White Sox ended the season with a record of 70–56 and in second place. Led by returning manager Maurice Myers, Kalamazoo ended the season 3.0 games behind the first place Saginaw Wa-was, as the league held no playoffs. Leonard Cote of Kalamazoo had a batting average of .327 that led the Southern Michigan League, while teammate Belmont Method had 24 wins to lead the league pitchers.

The Kalamazoo "Kazoos" placed fourth in the eight-team 1909 Southern Michigan League, which held no playoffs. Kalamazoo ended the season with a final record of 64–60 to place fourth, playing the season under manager Harry Martin. The Kalamazoo Kazoos ended the season 8.5 games behind the first place Saginaw Wa-was. Player/manager Harry Martin of Kalamazoo won the league batting championship, hitting .330.

The 1910 Kalamazoo Kazoos won the league championship. The Kazoos tied for first place in the eight-team Southern Michigan League final standings and then captured the playoff victory. Playing under manager Charles Wagner, the Kazoos finished with a final record of 87-52 and ended the season in a first-place tie with the Lansing Senators, who had an identical record. The two first place teams ended the Southern Michigan League season 4.0 games ahead of the third place Adrian Yeggs. Due to the tie in the standings, a playoff series was held, and Kalamazoo beat Lansing 4 games to 2 in the finals to claim the league championship. Kalamazoo's Bradley Valliere led the league with 23 wins and teammate Berne Hughey led the Southern Michigan League with 193 strikeouts.

In 1911, the Southern Michigan League was upgraded from a Class D level league to a Class C level league and the Kalamazoo "Celery Pickers" defended their league championship. With a record of 88–51, playing again under manager Charles Wagner, Kalamazoo finished 6.5 ahead of the second place Lansing Senators. With their first-place finish and no playoffs in the eight-team league, Kalamazoo won their second consecutive Michigan State League championship. Pitcher Beany Jacobson of Kalamazoo led Michigan State League 26 wins.

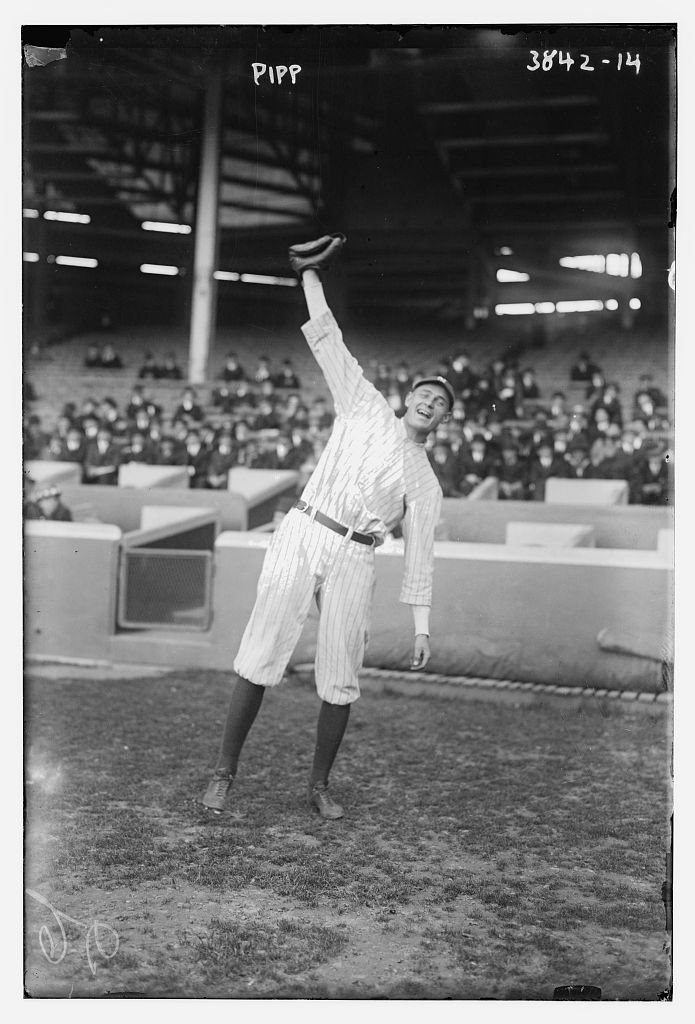
(1916) Wally Pipp, New York Yankees. Pipp played for the Kalamazoo Celery Pickers in 1911 and 1912.

In 1912, Wally Pipp was playing a second season for Kalamazoo after having played collegiately for the Catholic University Cardinals, where he was still in pursuit of his degree. In 68 games played for Kalamazoo, Pipp was hitting .270 late in the 1912 season, when the Detroit Tigers of the American League purchased his contract from Kalamazoo. After his contract was purchased by Detroit, Pipp initially threatened to hold out from reporting to the Tigers, demanding a portion of the purchase price for himself, and threatening to return to college. Pipp reported to Detroit without his demand being met.

In his career, Pipp became known as the player permanently replaced at 1B in the New York Yankees starting lineup by Lou Gehrig after taking a day off and Gehrig began his consecutive games streak of over 2,000 games. Due to the famous replacement by Gehrig, players began to say they were "Wally Pipped" when replaced in a lineup, due to a minor injury or a day off.

The Kalamazoo Celery Pickers placed fourth in the 1912 Southern Michigan League standings. Kalamazoo ended the season with a record of 63–62, with Charles Wagner continuing as manager. The Celery Pickers finished the season 15.0 games behind first place Adrian Lions.

The 1913 Kalamazoo "Kazoos" ended the Southern Michigan League season in seventh place in the final standings as the league became a Class D level league. The Kazoos ended the season near the bottom of the eight-team Southern Michigan League, with a 59–67 record. Charles Wagner continued as manager as the Kazoos ended the season in sixth place, 19.5 games behind first place Battle Creek Crickets in the eight-team league. Kalamazoo's Fred Bramble won the league batting championship, hitting .349.

The 1914 Kalamazoo Kazoos played their final season in the Class C level Southern Michigan League as the league expanded. The league expanded to become a ten-team league and Kalamazoo finished the season in last place. The Kazoos had an overall record of 49–97 record, as the team placed tenth in the ten-team league. The Kazoos were managed by Charles Wagner for the final time, with the team finishing 47.5 games behind first place Bay City Beavers. With their tenth-place finish, Kalamazoo did not qualify for the playoff final won by the Saginaw Ducks over Bay City.

In 1915, the Kalamazoo Kazoos did not return to play in the final season of Southern Michigan League, which permanently folded on July 7, 1915. The onset of World War I greatly affected minor leagues as many leagues and teams were folded. The Southern Michigan League never reformed.

=== Central League 1920 to 1922 ===
Without a minor league team in Kalamazoo in 1919, the "Stationery Independents" team played that season at the newly built Riverside Park with much local support. As a result, local businessman E. M. Sergeant led an effort organize a team for the newly reformed Central League. In early 1920, the "Celery Pickers," were formed. In February 1920 Sergeant signed a contract with what local papers called “one of the best known baseball men in America” Harry T. “Rube” Vickers, to manage the new team. Vickers went to Chicago, Philadelphia, Baltimore, and New York to recruit players for the new Kalamazoo team. Vickers received assistance from Philadelphia A's owner/manager and Connie Mack and baseball scout Henry L. Turner in securing players.

After a five-season hiatus, the 1920 Kalamazoo "Celery Pickers" had their roster set and formally returned to play in the Central League, which reformed as Class B level six-team league. The Grand Rapids Joshers, Ludington Mariners and Muskegon Muskies teams joined Kalamazoo in 1920 league play.

Kalamazoo finished as the runner up in their return to play in 1920. Playing the season under managers Rube Vickers and George Tomer, the Celery Pickers ended the season with a record of 64–60. Vickers was released after a slow start to the season and replaced by Tomer, who played 1B for Kalamazoo. No playoffs were held and Kalamazoo ended the season 11.0 games behind first place Grand Rapids.

The Kalamazoo Celery Pickers continued play as members of the Class B level Central League in 1921. The league expanded from a four team to a six-team league in 1921, adding the Lansing Senators and Jackson Mayors teams to the league.

The 1921 Kalamazoo Celery Pickers had a final record of 69–58 and again finished in second place in the final Central League standings. The 1921 managers were George Tomer and Grover Prough, as Kalamazoo finished 16.5 games behind the first place Ludington Mariners in the six-team league. Player/manager Grover Prough led the Central League with 97 RBI.

In 1922, Grover Prough returned as the Kalamazoo Celery Pickers manager. Ending the season, with a record of 61–67, the Celery Pickers finished in fourth place in the six-team Class B level Central League. Kalamazoo ended the season 15.0 games behind the first place Ludington Mariners. The Celery Pickers did not qualify for the playoff final, won by the Grand Rapids Billbobs over Ludington. The Central League did not return to play in 1923.

Following the 1922 season, Marty Becker organized an exhibition game in September against the Chicago Cubs. The game marked the first time a major league team played in Kalamazoo since 1886. A crowd of 2,500 was in attendance at Stationery Park and watched the Cubs defeat Kalamazoo 2–0. "All in all," said the local paper, "the day was a big success."

=== Michigan-Ontario League 1923 & 1924 ===
After the folding of the Central League, 1923, the Kalamazoo Celery Pickers continued minor league play, joining the Class B level Michigan-Ontario League. The Battle Creek Custers, Bay City Wolves, Flint Vehicles, Grand Rapids Billbobs, Hamilton Tigers, London Tecumsehs and Saginaw Aces teams joined Kalamazoo in beginning league play on May 15, 1923. Kalamazoo replaced the Brantford Brants in the league play.

In 1923, the Kalamazoo Celery Pickers placed fifth in their first season of Michigan-Ontario League play. The Celery Pickers finished with a record of 69–84, playing under manager Marty Becker. No playoffs were held, and Kalamazoo ended the season 12.0 games behind the first place Bay City Wolves in the final league standings.

Kalamazoo "Kazoos" finished in last place in the 1924 Michigan-Ontario League. Kalamazoo ended the regular season with a record of 45–88, placing eighth in the eight-team league, playing the season under managers Marty Becker and Newt Hunter. The Kazoos finished 39.5 games behind the first place Bay City Wolves in the eight-team league. With their last place finish, Kalamazoo did not qualify for the playoff, own by Bay City over Flint.

Kalamazoo did not return to the Michigan-Ontario League in 1925, which reduced to six teams in the final full season of play for the league.

=== 1926: Two leagues merge ===
The Kalamazoo Celery Pickers played in two separate leagues during the 1926 season, winning one league championship. Kalamazoo played in two leagues because the Central League and Michigan-Ontario League merged during the 1926 season to create a new league. The Celery Pickers began the season in the four-team Class D level Central League. On June 13, 1926, the league stopped play with Kalamazoo Celery Pickers in first place, with a record of 16–8. Kalamazoo finished 4.0 games ahead of the second place Ludington Tars in the Central League final standings, before the leagues merged. Boss Schmidt was the Kalamazoo manager as the team continued play in the newly formed league.

On June 15, 1926, the eight-team Class D level Michigan State League was reformed by the mid-season merger of the Central League and Michigan-Ontario League. The Bay City Wolves, Flint Vehicles, Port Huron and Saginaw Aces teams of the Michigan-Ontario League merged with the Grand Rapids Black Sox, Kalamazoo Celery Pickers, Ludington Tars and Muskegon Reds of the Central League to form the new Michigan State League.

Continuing play in 1926, the Celery Pickers finished in seventh place in the newly formed Michigan State League. Kalamazoo finished with a 39–59 record. Boss Schmidt continued as the Kalamazoo manager, replaced later in the season by Fred Hutton. With their seventh-place finish, the Celery Pickers ended the Michigan State League season 27.0 games behind the first place Bay City Wolves in the final league standings. Harry Green of Kalamazoo led the Michigan State League with 11 home runs.

The Michigan State League did not return to play in 1927 and Kalamazoo did not field another minor league team for nearly seventy years. The Kalamazoo Lassies played as members of the All-American Girls Professional Baseball League from 1950 to 1954. Kalamazoo next hosted another minor league team when the 1996 Kalamazoo Kodiaks began a tenure as members of the independent level Frontier League.

== The ballparks ==
In their seasons of minor league play, between 1887 and 1926, Kalamazoo teams hosted home games at four different ballparks in Kalamazoo.

In 1887 and 1888, the Kalamazoo Kazoos played at Athletic Park. The ballpark was also called the Wheaton Avenue Grounds and was dismantled in 1888 after league play ceased. Athletic Park was located at Wheaton Avenue and Davis Street in Kalamazoo, Michigan. The ballpark was originally called the Wheaton Avenue Grounds. Local baseball players Bill Doyle and Ollie Hungerford led the effort to build the ballpark on vacant land at the site. The ballpark opened on June 18, 1886, in strong fashion, with a game between a local Kalamazoo team and the Chicago White Sox.

In the 1889, 1895 and 1897 seasons, Kalamazoo played home games at the North Street Park. The ballpark was located at North Street and Stewart Avenue in Kalamazoo. North Side Park filled the void created in the absence of the Wheaton Avenue Grounds and construction was spearheaded by Kalamazoo banker Ed Dayton. At the beginning of the 1896 season, the park was enlarged, and the original grandstand moved the south to accommodate a new quarter-mile plank bicycle track on the grounds. The Kalamazoo College played at the North Street field. Following the 1897 season, now without a professional team, North Street Park was abandoned and was dismantled in 1898, with the grandstand lumber sold at auction. Today, the Woodward School for Technology & Research is located at the site, originally constructed in 1922. The school location is 606 Stewart Avenue in Kalamazoo, Michigan.

From 1906 to 1914, Kalamazoo hosted home minor league games at Riverview Park. The park was located near the fairgrounds in the era with a capacity of 1,500. In April 1905, sitework began on a new baseball field, located on the north side of Lake Street. The site location was just west of Recreation Park on the south side of Lake Street and a short walk from the streetcar line. Riverview Park was the name chosen for the new park, due to being near the Kalamazoo River. The ballpark was located on Healey Street at Lake Street in Kalamazoo. Today the site is residential and commercial.

Beginning in the 1920 season, Kalamazoo teams hosted minor league home games at Stationery Park. The park was also called Harrison Street Grounds. A new grandstand was added to the ballpark in 1924 with a capacity of 2,500.

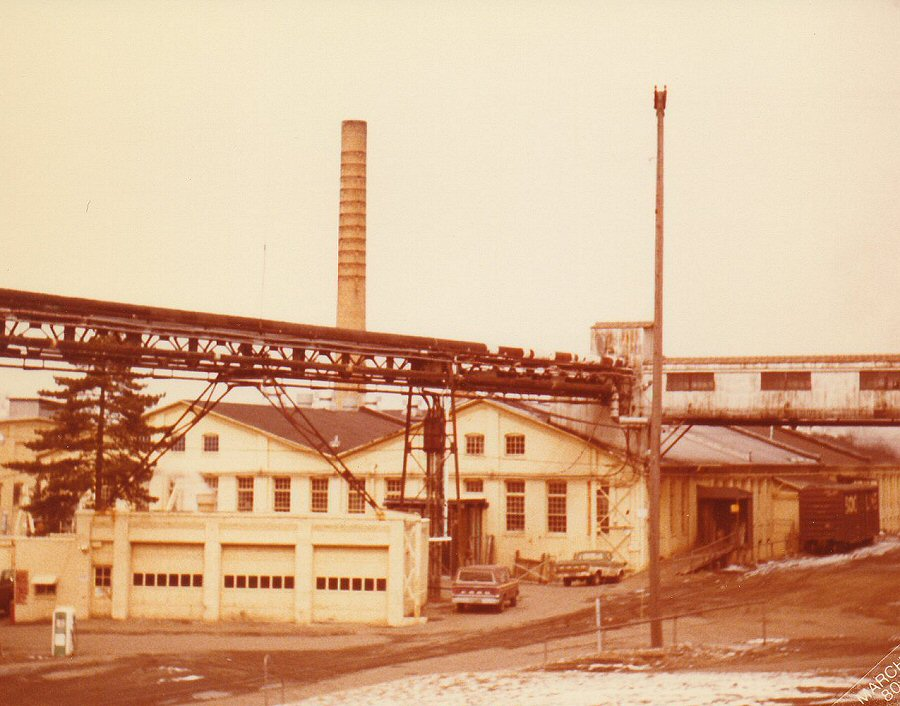
(1980) Allied Paper Mill constructed in 1921 and demolished in 2004. Kalamazoo, Michigan.

The ballpark was so named after the Kalamazoo Stationery Company. The company had purchased an old circus ground, located at the corner of Harrison and Frank streets, with future plans to build a production facility on the property. In the meantime, a ten-acre parcel on the site was aside by the company for use as a baseball park. For construction of the new ballpark, Engineers Billingham & Cobb were hired to prepare the construction plans for the new ballpark and H. L. Vanderhorst was contracted to construct the new grandstand, bleachers, and ballpark fencing.

Stationery Park opened in 1920, with costs of .75¢ for grandstand seats, .50¢ for bleacher seats and .25¢ for children's seats. Stationery Park was a few blocks from the streetcar lines, with special tracking to accommodate fans arriving on the Grand Rapids-Battle Creek interurban line. The ballpark also had five hundred automobile parking spaces. The ballpark was located at the North end of Harrison Street. The site on Harrison Street was between Walbridge Street and the Kalamazoo River in Kalamazoo, Michigan.

== Timeline ==
Year(s)	# Yrs.	Team	Level	League	Ballpark
1887	1	Kalazamoo Kazoos	Independent	Ohio State League	Wheaton Avenue Grounds
1888	1	Kalazamoo Kazoos	Independent	Tri-State League	Wheaton Avenue Grounds
1889	1	Kalazamoo Kazoos	Independent	Michigan State League	North Street Park
1895	1	Kalamazoo Celery Pickers	Class B	Michigan State League	North Street Park
1897	1	Kalamazoo Celery Pickers	Class D	Michigan State League	North Street Park
1906–1908	3	Kalamazoo White Sox	Class D	Southern Michigan League	Riverview Park
1909–1910	2	Kalamazoo Kazoos	Class D	Southern Michigan League	Riverview Park
1911–1912	2	Kalamazoo Celery Pickers	Class C	Southern Michigan League	Riverview Park
1913	1	Kalamazoo Kazoos	Class D	Southern Michigan League	Riverview Park
1914	1	Kalamazoo Kazoos	Class C	Southern Michigan League	Riverview Park
1920–1922	3	Kalamazoo Celery Pickers	Class B	Central League	Stationery Park
1923	1	Kalamazoo Celery Pickers	Class B	Michigan-Ontario League	Stationery Park
1924	1	Kalamazoo Kazoos	Class B	Michigan-Ontario League	Stationery Park
1926(1)	1	Kalamazoo Celery Pickers	Class B	Central League	Stationery Park
1926(2)	1	Kalamazoo Celery Pickers	Class B	Michigan State League	Stationery Park

== Year-by-year records ==
Year	Record	Finish	Manager	Playoffs/notes
1887	73–34	1st	Al Buckenberger	League champions No playoffs held
1888	62–37	NA	Tip O'Neill / A.W. Murphy	Team disbanded September 4
1889	38–59	6th	James Lombard / Tim Manning	Kalamazoo (32–42) moved to Flint September 3.
1895	50–41	3rd	Ed Mayo	No playoffs held
1897	32–51	4th	Fred Popkay / Ed Mayo	Kalamazoo (23–41) moved to Flint July 12; League disbanded August 16
1906	63–41	2nd	Clarence Pickell / Red Killefer	No playoffs held
1907	62–46	2nd	Maurice Myers	No playoffs held
1908	70–56	2nd	Maurice Myers	No playoffs held
1909	64–60	4th	Harry Martin	No playoffs held
1910	87–52	1st (t)	Charles Wagner	League champions Defeated Lansing in playoff
1911	88–51	1st	Charles Wagner	League champions No playoffs held
1912	63–62	4th	Charles Wagner	No playoffs held
1913	59–67	6th	Charles Wagner	No playoffs held
1914	49–97	10th	Charles Wagner	10-team league Did not qualify
1920	64–60	2nd	Rube Vickers / George Tomer	No playoffs held
1921	69–58	2nd	George Tomer / Grover Prough	No playoffs held
1922	61–67	4th	Grover Prough	Did not qualify
1923	69–64	5th	Marty Becker	No playoffs held
1924	45–88	8th	Marty Becker / Newt Hunter	Did not qualify
1926 (1)	16–8	1st	Boss Schmidt	League champions Merged to form new league June 15
1926 (2)	39–59	7th	Boss Schmidt / Fred Hutton	No playoffs held

== Notable alumni ==
- Sam Barnes (1921)
- Marty Becker (1912–1913, 1922, 1923–1924, MGR)
- Lynn Bell (1907–1908)
- Hal Bubser (1923–1924)
- Al Buckenberger (1897, MGR)
- Cupid Childs (1888)
- Gowell Claset (1926)
- Peter Connell (1887)
- Bernie DeViveiros (1923)
- Mike Donlin (1921)
- Hal Elliott (1923–1924)
- Harvey Freeman (1926)
- Charlie Krause (1897)
- Lou Criger (1895)
- Vince Dailey (1888)
- Hod Fenner (1920–1922)
- Ed Flynn (1924)
- Bill Geiss (1889)
- Frank Griffith (1895)
- Bill Hallahan (1924)
- Billy Hart (1887)
- Newt Hunter (1924, MGR)
- Bill Irwin (1887–1888)
- Beany Jacobson (1911, 1914)
- Ben Koehler (1923)
- Ernie Koob (1914))
- Charlie Krehmeyer (1888)
- Bill Killefer (1906)
- Red Killefer (1906, MGR)
- Frank Lobert (1909)
- Charlie Maher (1926)
- Tim Manning (1889, MGR)
- Bert Miller (1895, 1897)
- Leo Murphy (1924)
- Lou Nagelsen (1911)
- Frank Naleway (1924)
- Pat O'Connell (1924)
- Billy Otterson (1887)
- Wally Pipp (1911–1912)
- Elton Rynearson (1924)
- Boss Schmidt (1926, MGR)
- Crazy Schmit (1889)
- Bill Snyder (1924)
- Dan Sherman (1923–1924)
- Walter Thornton (1895)
- George Tomer (1920–1921, MGR; 1922)
- Bert Tooley (1909)
- Jim Tray (1887)
- Dick Van Zant (1887)
- Clyde Wares (1906))
- Earl Wolgamot (1922–1923)
- Gene Woodburn (1907)
- Rube Vickers (1920, MGR)

== See also ==
- Kalamazoo Celery Pickers players
- Kalamazoo White Sox players
- Kalamazoo Celery Eaters players
- Kalamazoo Celery Kazoos players
