= Ogdensburg Maples =

- 1946–1951; (1900–1901, 1936–1940, 1946–1951); Ogdensburg, New York

Minor league affiliations
- Class: Independent (1900–1901); Class C (1936–1940, 1946–1951)
- League: Northern New York League (1900–1901); Canadian–American League (1936–1940); Border League (1946–1951)

Major league affiliations
- Team: Philadelphia Phillies (1940); New York Giants (1948)

Minor league titles
- League titles (3): 1937; 1948; 1950
- Conference titles (1): 1940
- Wild card berths (7): 1936; 1937; 1938; 1947; 1948; 1949; 1950

Team data
- Name: Ogdensburg (1900–1901); Ogdensburg Colts (1936–1939); Ottawa-Ogdensburg Senators (1940); Ogdensburg Maples (1946–1951)
- Ballpark: Winter Park (1936–1940, 1946–1951)

The Ogdensburg Maples were a minor league baseball team based in Ogdensburg, New York. In 1900 and 1901, Ogdensburg played as members of the Northern New York League and the Ogdensburg Colts franchise was a member of the Canadian–American League from 1936 to 1940. The Maples played as members of the Class C level Border League from 1946 to 1951. Overall, Ogdensburg teams made seven playoff appearances, won three league championships and one pennant. The teams hosted minor league home games at Winter Park.

Ogdensburg teams played as a minor league affiliate of the Philadelphia Phillies in 1940 and New York Giants in 1948.

== History ==
=== Northern New York League 1900–1901 ===
Minor league baseball started in Ogdensburg, New York in 1900, when the Ogdensburg team became a charter member of the five–team Independent level Northern New York League. Ogdensburg finished with a 4–14 record and placed fifth in the 1901 Northern New York League, playing the season under manager S.H Cook. The Ogdensburg franchise folded from the league after the 1901 season.

=== Canadian–American League 1936–1940 ===
Minor league baseball returned to Ogdensburg in 1936, when the Ogdensburg Colts became charter members of the 1936 Class C level Canadian–American League. The 1936 final league standings featured the Brockville Pirates (43–36), Ogdensburg Colts (38–45), Oswego Netherlands (32–51), Ottawa Senators (53–37), Perth Blue Cats/Royals (50–30) and Watertown Grays/Massena Bucks (35–52). The 1936 Ogdensburg Colts finished with a Canadian-American League regular season record of 38–45. Their fourth-place finish in the CCL under managers George Lee and Bernard Fasulo qualified the team for the playoffs. In the 1936 playoffs, the Perth Blue Cats/Royals defeated the Ogdensburg Colts 3 games to 2.

The 1937 Ogdensburg Colts were the Canadian-American League champions. The Colts ended the season with a record of 55–47, placing fourth in the Canadian-American League regular season. On August 21, 1937, Colts pitcher Leo Pukas threw a no–hitter in a 9–0 victory over the Ottawa Braves. Playing under manager George Lee, the Ogdensburg Colts defeated the Oswego Netherlands 3 games 1 in the playoff semi–final. In the league Finals, the Ogdensburg Colts and Gloversville Glovers played to a seven–game series, with the Colts winning 4 games to 3. The Colts' season attendance was 27,827, an average of 546 per home game.

In the 1938 season, the Ogdensburg Colts placed third in the Canadian-American League regular season standings. Ogdensburg finished with a record of 66–52, playing the season under manager George Lee. On September 5, 1938, Ogdensburg pitcher Ed Lauer threw a perfect game in a 7–inning game, as Lauer and the Colts defeated the Ottawa Braves 7–0. In the 1938 Playoffs, the Cornwall Bisons swept the Ogdensburg Colts 4 games to 0. The 1938 Colts' season attendance was 27,016, an average of 458.

The 1939 season was the final one for Ogdensburg under the "Colts" moniker. Ogdensburg finished with a record of 60–58, placing fifth in the Canadian-American League regular season standings, missing the playoffs. Their manager was the returning George Lee. The 1939 Attendance was 19,849, an average of 336. The Ogdensburg Colts franchise folded after the 1939 season.

=== Ottawa partnership ===
In 1940, Ogdensburg partnered with Ottawa, Ontario in creating a franchise that played home games both cities. The Ottawa-Ogdensburg Senators won the 1940 Canadian-American League pennant. The Ottawa Senators franchise played half their 1940 Canadian-American League season in Ogdensburg. The team was an affiliate of the Philadelphia Phillies. Under manager Cy Morgan, the Senators finished with a 84–39 record, placing first in the regular season standings. In the 1940 Playoffs, the Amsterdam Rugmakers defeated the Ottawa-Ogdensburg Senators 4 games to 1. Neither Ottawa or Ogdensburg fielded a team in 1941.

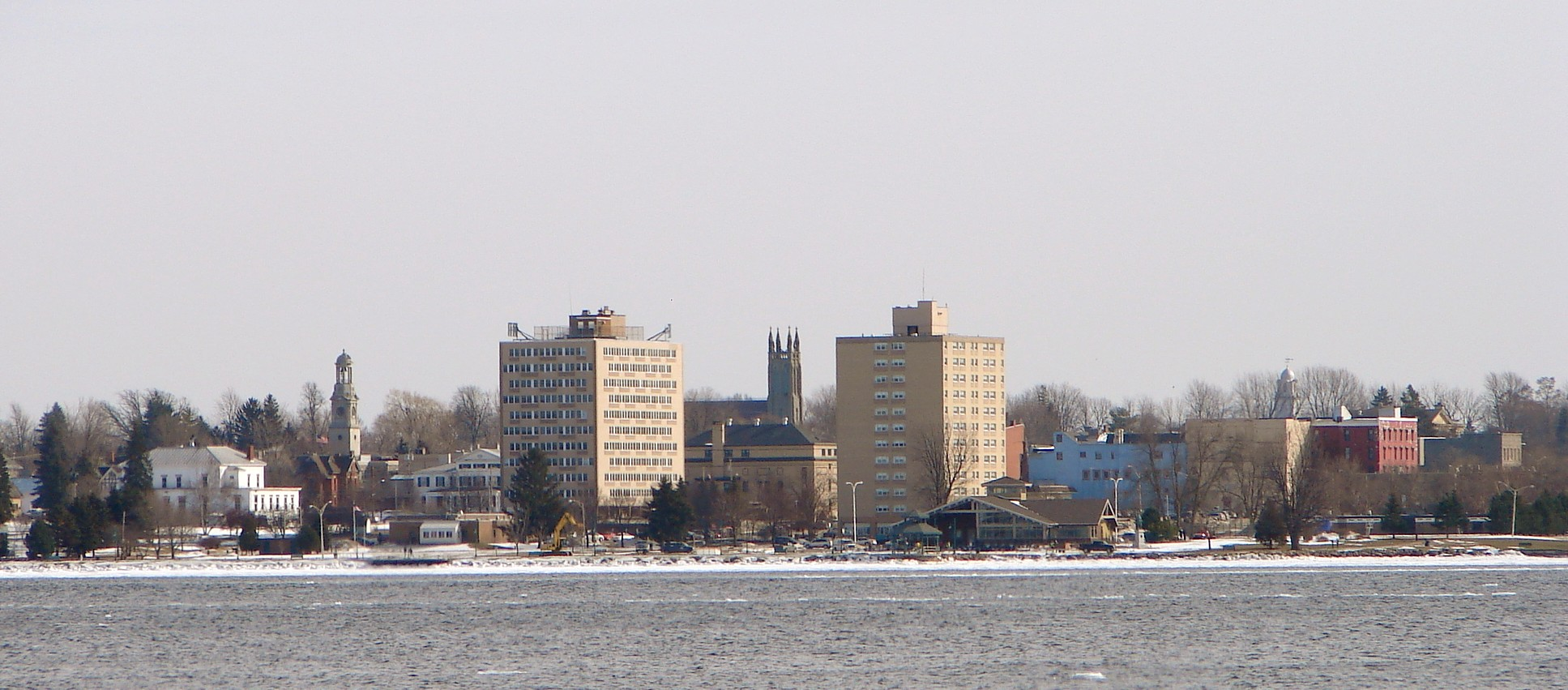
(2010) Ogdensburg, New York

=== Border League 1946–1951 ===
Minor league baseball returned when the 1946 Ogdensburg Maples became charter members of the Class C level Border League. The 1946 six–team league standings featured the Auburn Cayugas (72–44), Granby Red Sox (54–60), Kingston Ponies (58–55), Ogdensburg Maples (50–68), Sherbrooke Canadians (46–71) and Watertown Athletics (69–51) In their initial season, the 1946 Ogdensburg Maples finished with a record of 50–68, placing fifth in the Border League standings. Led by manager Bobby Dill, the Maples did not qualify for the playoffs. Resuming play at Winter Park, the 1946 season home attendance was 28,395, an average of 481 per contest.

The Ogdensburg Maples reached the Border League Finals in 1947. Finishing the regular season at 61–65, placing fourth in the Border League, manager Steve Yerkes led the Maples to the playoffs. In the 1947 playoffs, the Ogdensburg Maples advanced by defeating the Watertown Athletics in a seven-game series 4 games to 3. In the Finals, the Ottawa Nationals defeated the Ogdensburg Maples 4 games 2. Ogdensburg's season attendance was 63,486, an average of 1,008.

The 1948 Ogdensburg Maples won the Border League championship while playing as an affiliate of the New York Giants. The Maples finished the regular season with a record of 69–60, placing third in the regular season standings, while playing under manager Russ Wein. In the playoffs, the Ogdensburg Maples advanced by defeating the Ottawa Senators 4 games to 1. In the 1948 Finals, the Ogdensburg Maples won the championship by sweeping the Watertown Athletics 4 games to 0. The Maples season attendance was 60,116.

The Ogdensburg Maples again advanced to the Border League playoffs in 1949. Finishing in third place with a regular season, with a record of 70–60, the team was again managed by Russ Wein. The Maples lost in the playoffs, defeated by the Geneva Robins 4 games to 3. The season attendance was 58,749.

The 1950 Ogdensburg Maples won their second Border League championship. After a second place 74–54 finish under manager Russ Wein, the Maples qualified for the playoffs. In the 1950 playoffs, the Ogdensburg Maples advanced to the finals by defeating the Watertown Athletics 4 games to 1. In the playoff finals, the Ogdensburg Maples won the championship by defeating the Ottawa Senators 4 games to 2. The 1950 Maples season attendance was 55,291, an average of 864 per game.

The Border League folded during the 1951 season. Managed by John Sosh and Irvin Schupp, the Ogdensburg Maples had a record of 29–35, and were in second place when the Border League permanently disbanded on July 16, 1951.

Ogdensburg has not hosted another minor league baseball team after the 1951 Ogdensburg Maples and the Border League folded.

== The ballpark ==
The Ogdensburg teams hosted home minor league home games at Winter Park. The ballpark site also hosted a skating rink in the winter months. The field dimensions were (left–center–right) 260–450–386. The ballpark had a seating capacity of 1,800 and had no lights when hosting the Colts, before lighting was installed when the Ogdensburg Maples resumed play. The ballpark grandstand once collapsed during a game. Today, the ballpark has been renamed to "Father Martin Field." Still in use, the ballpark is located next to the Knights of Columbus at 721 Hasbrouck Street in Ogdensburg, New York.

== Timeline ==
Year(s)	# Yrs.	Team	Level	League	Affiliate	Ballpark
1900–1901	2	Ogdensburg	Independent	Northern New York League	None	Winter Park
1936–1939	4	Ogdensburg Colts	Class C	Canadian–American League	None	Winter Park
1940	1	Ottawa-Ogdensburg Senators	Class C	Canadian–American League	Philadelphia Phillies	Winter Park
1946–1947	2	Ogdensburg Maples	Class C	Border League	None	Winter Park
1948	1	Ogdensburg Maples	Class C	Border League	New York Giants	Winter Park
1949–1951	3	Ogdensburg Maples	Class C	Border League	None	Winter Park

== Notable alumni ==
- Merle Anthony (1946)
- Joe Camacho (1949)
- Frank Fanovich (1946)
- Jim Galvin (1938)
- Dixie Howell (1940) College Football Hall of Fame (1970)
- George Jumonville (1940)
- Olav Kollevoll (1946)
- Ken Jungels (1949)
- Garland Lawing (1948)
- George Lee (1937–1939, MGR) Canadian Baseball Hall of Fame (1998)
- Jake Livingstone (1901)
- Hal Marnie (1940)
- Paul Masterson (1940)
- Bill Peterman (1940)
- Johnny Podgajny (1940)
- Doc Scanlan (1901)
- Lou Sleater (1947–1948)
- Maurice Van Robays (1937)
- Steve Yerkes (1947, MGR)

== See also ==
- Ogdensburg Maples players
