= Port Huron Saints =

- 1921–1926; (1883, 1890, 1895, 1897–1898 1900, 1912–1913, 1921–1922, 1926); Port Huron, Michigan

Minor league affiliations
- Class: Independent (1883, 1890); Class B (1895); Class D (1897); Independent (1898, 1900); Class D (1912–1913); Class B (1921–1922, 1926)
- League: Michigan State League (1890, 1895, 1897); International League (1898, 1900); Border League (1912–1913); Michigan-Ontario League (1921–1922, 1926); Michigan State League (1926)

Major league affiliations
- Team: None

Minor league titles
- League titles (1): 1926

Team data
- Name: Port Huron (1883, 1890); Port Huron Marines (1895); Port Huron (1897); Port Huron Tigers (1898); Port Huron Tunnelites (1900); Port Huron Independents (1912–1913); Port Huron Saints (1921–1922, 1926)
- Ballpark: Athletic Club Grounds (1890, 1895, 1897); Recreation Park (1900, 1912–1913); Watkins Field (1912–1913, 1921–1922, 1926)

The Port Huron Saints were a minor league baseball team based in Port Huron, Michigan. The "Saints" played as members of Michigan-Ontario League from 1921 to 1922 and 1926, with a final partial season in the 1926 Michigan State League.

Beginning in 1883, Port Huron minor league teams played as members of the Michigan State League in 1890, 1895 and 1897, the International League in 1898 and 1900, the Border League from 1912 to 1913, prior to the "Port Huron "Saints."

The early Port Huron hosted home minor league games at the Athletic Club Grounds, then Recreation Park in 1900 before beginning play at Watkins Park in 1912.

== History ==
=== 1883 to 1900: Michigan State League / International League ===
Minor league baseball began in Port Huron, Michigan in 1883, with an Independent minor league team. No records for the 1883 team are known.

The Port Huron team resumed minor league play as members of the 1890 Michigan State League. After beginning play on May 19, 1890, the independent level league folded on June 13, 1890. At the time the independent level league folded, Port Huron had an 11–14 record and were in fourth place, playing under manager Joe Walsh. Port Huron ended the season 6.0 games behind the first place Grand Rapids Shamrocks.

Returning to Michigan State League play, the 1895 Port Huron Marines rejoined the Class B level league before folding during the season. On September 3, 1895, the Marines folded 27–51 record, playing under managers Boocher, Charles Schaub and Thomas Jenkinson. The Adrian Demons were the eventual league champions.

The 1897 Port Huron team joined the reformed six–team Class D level Michigan State League for a partial season. The league folded on August 16, 1897. At the time the league folded, Port Huron was in third place. Port Huron concluded the season with a 29–42 record, playing the season under managers Gobel and D. McCarron. Port Huron finished 8.5 behind the first place Bay City team in the final standings.

The Port Huron Tigers continued play in 1898, joining a new League and finished in last place. The team was also called the "Braves" in 1898, with Port Huron joining the Independent level International League. The Tigers finished in last place with a 24–30 record. Placing sixth in the six-team league, which ended play on July 8, 1888. Playing under manager John Murphy, the Tigers finished 14.5 games behind the first place Bay City Sugar Citys in the final standings.

The International League resumed play in 1900, with the Port Huron Tunnelites as a member. Rejoining the Independent level International League, Port Huron began playing home games at Recreation Park. Port Huron finished last in the league standings. Ending the season with a final record of 12–29, Port Huron placed sixth in the six-team league. Playing under managers Pat Flaherty and Bert Eltom, the Tunnelites finished 16.5 games behind the first place Hamilton Hams when the league stopped play on July 4, 1900.

=== 1912 to 1926: Border League / International League / Michigan–Ontario league / Michigan State League ===
In 1912, Port Huron resumed minor league play. The Port Huron Independents became charter members of the Class D level Border League, which featured teams from both the United States and Canada. The 1912 five–team league featured the Mount Clemens Bathers, Pontiac Indians, Windsor and Wyandotte Alkalis joining the Independents in beginning league play.

The 1912 Port Huron Independents finished last in the Border League standings. Beginning league play on May 30, 1912, Port Huron ended the 1912 season with a record of 7–17 playing under manager Bill Brown. Port Huron finished 12.0 games behind the first place Wyandotte Alkalis (19–5), followed by the second place Pontiac Indians (14–9), Windsor (9–14) and the Mount Clemens Bathers (11–15) in the final standings.

The Port Huron Independents continued play as members of the 1913 Class D level International league. Beginning play on May 24, 1913, the Port Huron Independents placed third in the Border League final standings. Port Huron ended the 1913 season with a 15–19 record as Bill Brown returned as manager. The Independents finished 9.0 games behind the first place Ypsilanti, Michigan team in the six–team league. The Border League permanently folded following the 1913 season.

Port Huron returned to minor league play in 1921. The Port Huron "Saints" became members of the eight–team Class B level Michigan–Ontario league, replacing the Battle Creek Custers franchise in the league. The team is also referred to as the Port Huron–Sarnia Saints referring to a partnership with neighboring Sarnia, Ontario, located just across the St. Clair River from Port Huron, Michigan. The Saints finished the 1921 season in fifth place. With a final record of 58–63, playing under managers James Pierce, Steve Harder and Billy Kelly, Port Huron ended the season 15.5 games behind the first place London Tecumseh in the standings. Port Huron did not qualify for the playoff won by the London Tecumsehs.

The Port Huron Saints continued play in the 1922 Michigan–Ontario league, again placing fifth in the final standings. Playing under returning manager Bill Kelly, the Saints ended the season with a final record of 67–65. Port Huron finished 16.5 games behind the first place Hamilton Tigers and did not qualify for the playoff won by Hamilton. Saints pitcher Richard Glazier of led the Michigan–Ontario league with an ERA of 1.31. The Port Huron franchise folded after the 1922 season and did not return to the Michigan-Ontario league in 1923.

=== 1926 season" Two leagues ===
The "Port Huron Saints" returned to play for a final season in 1926, playing in two leagues during the season and winning a championship. Port Huron began the 1926 season playing in the four–team Class B level Michigan–Ontario League, which reformed during the season. The Michigan–Ontario League stopped play on June 13, 1926, when the league merged with the Central League to form the new Michigan State League. The Michigan State League began play June 15, 1926. The Saints were in first place when the Michigan–Ontario League dissolved on June 13, as Port Huron finished with a 20–10 record to claim the final Michigan–Ontario League championship, playing under manager Johnny Carlin and finishing 1.0 game ahead of the second place Saginaw Aces.

Resuming play in the newly formed eight–team Class B level Michigan State League, Port Huron finished in second place with a 56–38 record, continuing play under manager Johnny Carlin and finishing 8.0 games behind the first place Bay City Wolves. The Michigan State League did not return to play in 1927.

Port Huron, Michigan has not hosted another minor league team.

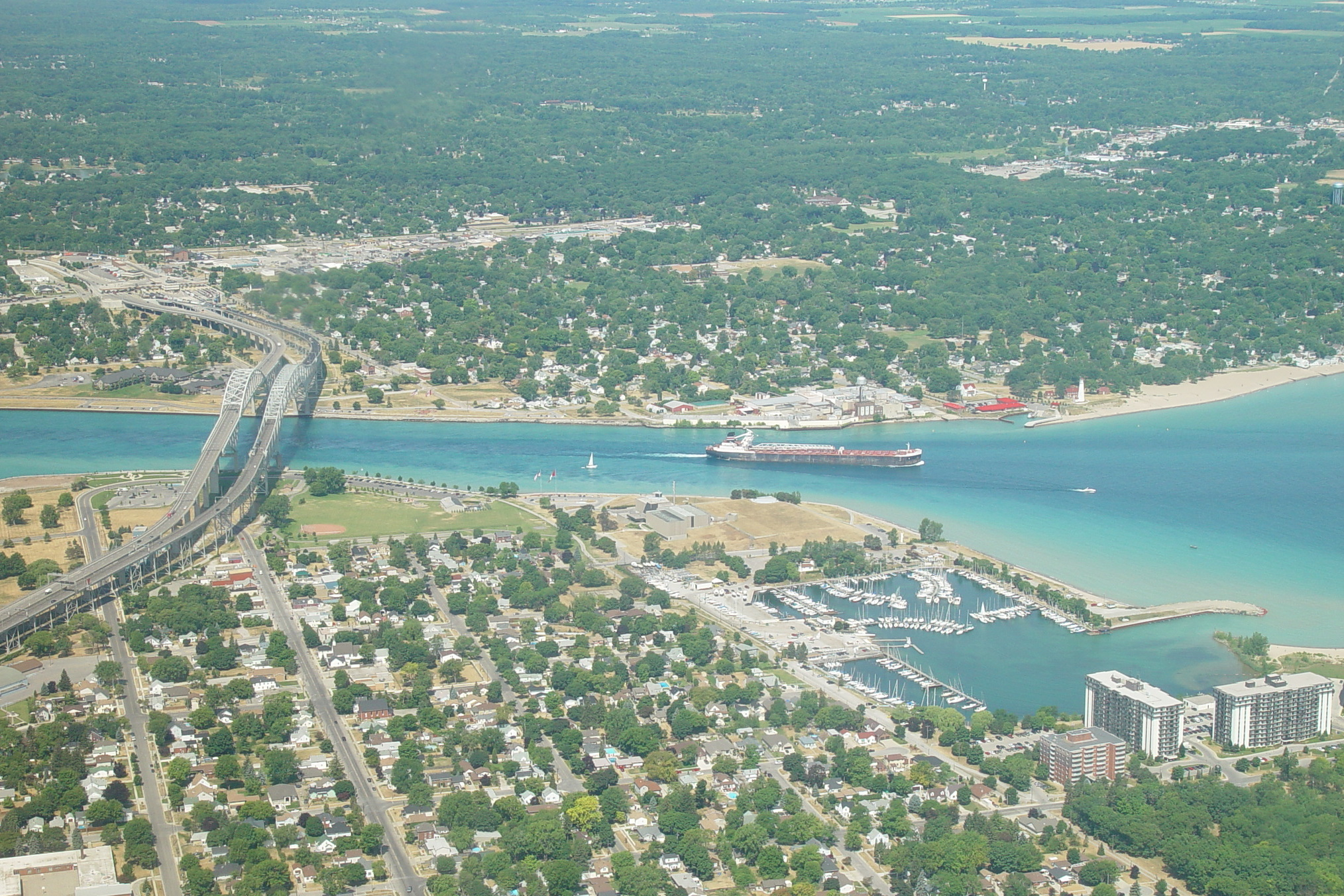
(2007) Bluewater Bridge. Port Huron, Michigan

== The ballparks ==
In the early era, from 1890 through the 1897 minor league seasons, Port Huron hosted home games at the Athletic Club Grounds.

In the 1900 season and also for select games in 1912 and 1913, Port Huron played minor league home games at Recreation Park. The site was also known as "Driving Park" and was located at Elmwood & 13 Street, Port Huron, Michigan.

Beginning in 1912, Port Huron played minor league home games at Watkins Field. First called "Athletic Park," the ballpark was later named for Port Huron native William H. Watkins, who was notably a major league manager and former Port Huron player. The ballpark was also utilized by Port Huron High School. The ballpark no longer exists and was located at 24th Street & Moak Street, Port Huron, Michigan.

== Timeline ==
Year(s)	# Yrs.	Team	Level	League	Ballpark
1883	1	Port Huron	Independent	Independent	Athletic Club Grounds
1890	1	Port Huron	Independent	Michigan State League	Athletic Club Grounds
1895	1	Port Huron Marines	Class B	Michigan State League	Athletic Club Grounds
1897	1	Port Huron	Class D	Michigan State League	Athletic Club Grounds
1898	1	Port Huron Tigers	Independent	International League	Athletic Club Grounds
1900	1	Port Huron Tunnelites	Independent	International League	Recreation Park
1912–1913	2	Port Huron Independents	Class D	Border League	Watkins Park
1921–1922	2	Port Huron Saints	Class B	Michigan-Ontario League	Watkins Park
1926 (1)	1	Port Huron Saints	Class B	Michigan-Ontario League	Watkins Park
1926 (2)	1	Port Huron Saints	Class B	Michigan State League	Watkins Park

== Year-by-year records ==
Year	Record	Finish	Manager	Playoffs/notes
1883	0–0	NA	NA	Standings information unknown
1890	11–14	4th	Joe Walsh	League folded June 13
1895	27–51	6th	George Brown / Charles Schaub / Thomas Jenkinson	No playoffs held
1897	29–42	3rd	Gobel / D. McCarron	League folded August 16
1898	24–30	6th	John Murphy	League ceased play July 8
1900	12–29	6th	Pat Flaherty / Bert Eltom	No playoffs held
1912	7–17	6th	Bill Brown	No playoffs held
1913	13–18	4th	Henry McIntoch	No playoffs held
1921	58–63	5th	James Pierce / Steve Harder / Billy Kelly	Did not qualify
1922	67–65	5th	Billy Kelly	Did not qualify
1926 (1)	20–10	1st	Johnny Carlin	League champions
1926 (2)	56–38	2nd	Johnny Carlin	No playoffs held

== Notable alumni ==
- Louis Brower (1926)
- Ed Bruyette (1900)
- Bunk Congalton (1895)
- Pat Flaherty (1900, MGR)
- Emil Frisk (1898)
- Shorty Gallagher (1900)
- Norman Glaser (1922)
- Frank Griffity (1895)
- Frank Harris (1800)
- Bill Harper (1912)
- Trader Horne (1921–1922)
- Ralph Judd (1922)
- Billy Kelly (1922–1923, MGR)
- Red Long (1900)
- Jon Morrison (1890)
- Fred O'Neill (1890)
- Frank Quinn (1898)
- Fred Schemanske (1922)
- Vern Spencer (1913)
- Joe Walsh (1912)
- Bill Watkins (1883)
- Clarence Winters (1921–1922)

== See also ==
- Port Huron (minor league baseball) players
- Port Huron Independents players
- Port Huron Marines players
- Port Huron Saints players
- Port Huron Tigers players
- Port Huron Tunnelites players
