= Border League (baseball) =

- Most recent season or competition: 1951 Border League season
- Classification: Class D (1912–1913); Class C (1946–1951)
- Sport: Minor League Baseball
- First season: 1912
- Folded: 1951
- President: Richard Jackson (1912); A. L. Ulbrich (1913); John G. Ward (1946–1951)
- No. of teams: 8
- Country: United States of America
- Most titles: 2 Ogdensburg Maples (1948, 1950)

The Border League was the name of two 20th-century circuits in North America minor league baseball. The first Border league operated in the 1912 and 1913 seasons as a Class D level league with five teams based in Michigan and one in Ontario. The Border League resumed play from 1946 to 1951 as a Class C level minor league, with teams based in New York, Quebec and Ontario.

== 1912–1913 league in Michigan and Ontario ==
The first, also known as the Eastern Michigan League, was a Class D minor league in 1912 and 1913 at the Canada–US border. It was composed of five teams from Michigan and one from Windsor, Ontario. This six-team league never really got off the ground, playing a minimal 35 game schedule. The league lost one Michigan team that disbanded in 1913. This action helped cause the league's downfall. There was no known effort to organize the league in 1914.

=== 1912–1913 cities and teams ===
- Mount Clemens, Michigan: Mount Clemens Bathers 1912–1913
- Port Huron, Michigan: Port Huron Independents 1912–1913
- Pontiac, Michigan: Pontiac Indians 1912–1913
- Windsor, Ontario: Windsor 1912–1913
- Wyandotte, Michigan:Wyandotte Alkalis 1912–1913
- Ypsilanti, Michigan: Ypsilanti 1913

== 1946–1951 league in New York, Ontario and Quebec ==
The name was revived for a post-World War II Class C circuit that operated from 1946 through 1951 before shutting down. It was represented by nine cities, five from across the Canada–US border (four from Ontario and one from Quebec) and four from the state of New York. The four New York, teams, along with the Kingston, Ontario, squad were able to make the full run. The Ottawa Senators entry won three of the league's six pennants.

The league proved to be a good solid competitive group for the first five years. Attendance was good, the league drew over 1,600,000 fans the first five years before finally disbanding on July 16, 1951.

=== 1946–1951 cities and teams ===
- Auburn, New York: Auburn Cayugas 1946–1950, Auburn Falcons 1951
- Cornwall, Ontario: Cornwall Canadians 1951
- Geneva, New York: Geneva Red Birds 1947, Geneva Robins 1948–1951
- Granby, Quebec: Granby Red Sox 1946
- Kingston, Ontario: Kingston Ponies 1946–1951
- Ogdensburg, New York: Ogdensburg Maples 1946–1951
- Ottawa, Ontario: Ottawa Nationals 1947, Ottawa Senators 1948–1949, Ottawa Nationals 1950
- Sherbrooke, Quebec: Sherbrooke Canadians 1946
- Watertown, New York: Watertown Athletics 1946–1951

== Standings and statistics ==
=== 1912 and 1913 ===
1912 Border League schedule

Team standings	W	L	PCT	GB	Managers
Wyandotte Alkalis	19	5	.792	–	H. R. Brown
Pontiac Indians	14	9	.609	4½	Henry McIntoch
Mount Clemens Bathers	11	15	.423	9	W. Trombley
Windsor	9	14	.391	9½	J. Wilkie
Port Huron Independents	7	17	.292	12	Bill Brown

No Playoffs Scheduled.

Player statistics
Player	Team	Stat	Tot	Player	Team	Stat	Tot
Frank Loranger	Wyandotte	BA	.376	Frank Loranger	Wyandotte	Hits	37
Orville Woodruff	Wyandotte	Runs	21				

1913 Border League schedule

Team standings	W	L	PCT	GB	Managers
Ypsilanti	24	10	.706	–	W. C. Pearce
Wyandotte Alkalis	24	13	.649	1½	H. R. Browne
Port Huron Independents	15	19	.441	9	Bill Brown
Pontiac Indians	13	18	.418	9½	Henry McIntoch
Windsor	10	24	.294	14	James Wilkie / Arthur Goodman
Mount Clemens Bathers	7	9	.437	NA	W.Trombley

Mount Clemens disbanded July 12.

Player statistics
Player	Team	Stat	Tot	Player	Team	Stat	Tot
Jack Shafer	Ypsilanti	BA	.395	Ferdy Manning	Wyandotte	W	10
Carl Stimpson	Ypsilanti	Runs	30	George Mueller	Port Huron	SO	149
Orville Woodruff	Wyandotte	Hits	49	Ralph Bell	Ypsilanti	Pct	1.000; 6–0

Home Runs: 4 players tied with 2 each.

=== 1946 to 1951 ===
1946 Border League

Team standings	W	L	PCT	GB	Attend	Managers
Auburn Cayugas	72	44	.621	–	48,683	Barney Hearn
Watertown Athletics	69	51	.575	5	53,605	Jim Scott
Kingston Ponies	58	55	.513	12½	60,957	Ben Lady
Granby Red Sox	54	60	.474	17	31,159	Bill Sisler / Hal Cleves
Ogdensburg Maples	50	68	.424	23	28,395	Bob Dill
Sherbrooke Canadiens	46	71	.393	26½	25,576	George T. Smith / Dutch Proecher

Playoffs: Kingston 3 games, Auburn 1. Watertown 3 games, Granby 1.
Finals: Watertown 4 games, Kingston 2.

Player statistics
Player	Team	Stat	Tot	Player	Team	Stat	Tot
Bob Dill	Ogdenburg	BA	.397	Arnold Jarrell	Kingston	W	21
Bob Dill	Ogdenburg	RBI	118	Peter Karpuk	Kingston	SO	175
Bob Dill	Ogdenburg	HR	20	Arnold Jarrell	Kingston	ERA	2.30
James Heximer	Kingston	Hits	156				

1947 Border League schedule

Team standings	W	L	PCT	GB	Attend	Managers
Ottawa Nationals	82	42	.661	–	62,607	Paul Dean
Watertown Athletics	70	54	.565	12	53,600	Bob Shawkey
Auburn Cayugas	66	60	.524	17	59,637	Barney Hearn
Ogdensburg Maples	61	65	.484	22	63,486	Steve Yerkes
Kingston Ponies	49	77	.389	34	52,268	Ben Lady
Geneva Red Birds	46	76	.377	35	57,308	Charles Small

Playoffs: Ottawa 4 games, Auburn 0. Ogdensburg 4 games, Watertown 3.
Finals: Ottawa 4 games, Ogdensburg 2.

Player statistics
Player	Team	Stat	Tot	Player	Team	Stat	Tot
Barney Hearn	Auburn	BA	.361	Frank Fanovich	Watertown	W	16
Anthony Gudaitis	Ogdensburg	Runs	122	Arnold Jarrell	Kingston	W	16
Fred Gerken	Watertown	Hits	172	Charles Schupp	Ottawa	W	16
Donald Phelps	Geneva	RBI	103	Nick Butcher	Ottawa	W	16
Donald Phelps	Geneva	HR	25	Frank Fanovich	Watertown	SO	182
Anthony Gudaitis	Geneva	HR	25	Frank Fanovich	Watertown	ERA	2.41

1948 Border League schedule

Team standings	W	L	PCT	GB	Attend	Managers
Ottawa Senators	79	48	.622	–	76,299	Bill Metzig
Geneva Robins	72	54	.571	6½	66,149	Charles Small
Ogdensburg Maples	69	60	.535	11	60,116	Russ Wein
Watertown Athletics	63	65	.492	16½	65,590	Fred Gerken
Kingston Ponies	49	76	.392	29	40,656	Ben Lady
Auburn Cayugas	49	78	.386	30	43,102	Barney Hearn

Playoffs: Ogdensburg 4 games, Ottawa 1. Watertown 4 games, Geneva 3.
Finals: Ogdensburg 4 games, Watertown 0.

Player statistics
Player	Team	Stat	Tot	Player	Team	Stat	Tot
Garland Lawing	Ogdensburg	BA	.379	Leonard Seamon	Ottawa	W	21
Garland Lawing	Ogdensburg	Runs	112	Arthur Cook	Kingston	W	21
Garland Lawing	Ogdensburg	Hits	164	Bill Gates	Watertown	SO	232
Garland Lawing	Ogdensburg	RBI	122	Leonard Seamon	Ottawa	ERA	2.00
Bill Reardon	Kingston	HR	24				

1949 Border League schedule

Team standings	W	L	PCT	GB	Attend	Managers
Geneva Robins	81	49	.623	–	67,259	Charles Small
Ottawa Senators	74	55	.574	6½	78,577	Bill Metzig
Ogdensburg Maples	70	60	.538	11	58,749	Russ Wein
Auburn Cayugas	67	62	.519	13	55.634	Barney Hearn
Watertown Athletics	58	71	.450	22½	61,026	Frank Heller
Kingston Ponies	38	91	.295	42½	38,671	Zeke Bonura / Harold Leach

Playoffs: Geneva 4 games, Ogdensburg 3. Auburn 4 games, Ottawa 3.
Finals: Geneva 4 games, Auburn 2.

Player Statistics
Player	Team	Stat	Tot	Player	Team	Stat	Tot
Doug Harvey	Ottawa	BA	.351	Donald Bryant	Ogdensburg	W	20
Doug Harvey	Ottawa	Runs	121	Bill Forst	Geneva	SO	170
William Scally	Ogdensburg	Hits	177	Robert Sundstrom	Geneva	ERA	2.29
Doug Harvey	Ottawa	RBI	109	Pete Kousagen	Geneva	HR	22

1950 Border League schedule

Team standings	W	L	PCT	GB	Attend	Managers
Ottawa Nationals	75	53	.586	–	97,091	Bill Metzig
Ogdensburg Maples	74	54	.578	1	55,291	Russ Wein
Kingston Ponies	68	60	.531	7	52,453	Barney Hearn
Watertown Athletics	60	68	.469	15	65,329	Frank Heller
Geneva Robins	56	71	.441	18½	42,353	Charles Small / Clyde Theriault
Auburn Cayugas	50	77	.394	24½	41,755	Bill Sisler / Tom Accardo / Bill Gates

Playoffs: Ottawa 4 games, Kingston 1. Ogdensburg 4 games, Watertown 1.
Finals: Ogdensburg 4 games, Ottawa 2.

Player statistics
Player	Team	Stat	Tot	Player	Team	Stat	Tot
John Sosh	Ogdensburg	BA	.348	Harry Pilarski	Kingston	W	19
Peter Karpuk	Ottawa	Runs	111	Norm Gosselin	Geneva	W	19
Irvin Schupp	Ogdensburg	Hits	173	Joseph Greco	Ogdensburg	SO	204
Peter Kousagan	Geneva	RBI	125	Edward Flanagan	Ottawa	ERA	1.96
Peter Kousagan	Geneva	HR	31				

1951 Border League

Team standings	W	L	PCT	GB	Attend	Managers
Kingston Ponies	38	25	.603	–	13,862	Barney Hearn
Ogdensburg Maples	29	35	.453	9½	13,978	John Sosh / Irvin Schupp
Cornwall Canadians	29	18	.617	NA	4,892	Bill Metzig
Auburn Cayugas	26	26	.500	NA	13,826	Bill Gates
Watertown Athletics	22	30	.423	NA	18,055	Bob Shawkey
Geneva Robins	20	30	.400	NA	12,405	Humberto Baez

Cornwall and Geneva disbanded June 26; Auburn and Watertown disbanded July 1.
The league disbanded July 16. Last game played on July 10.

Player statistics
Player	Team	Stat	Tot	Player	Team	Stat	Tot
Bob Masterson	Auburn	BA	.394	Gideon Applegate	Kingston	W	10
Pedro Arroyo	Kingston	Runs	53	Bill Gates	Auburn	SO	94
Pedro Arroyo	Kingston	Hits	79	Gideon Applegate	Kingston	ERA	2.85
Olav Kollevoll	Ogdensburg	RBI	57	John Sosh	Ogdensburg	HR	12
Olav Kollevoll	Ogdensburg	HR	12				
