= Mount Clemens Bathers =

- 1906–1914; (1906–1907, 1912–1914); Mount Clemens, Michigan

Minor league affiliations
- Class: Class D (1906–1907, 1912–1913); Class C (1914)
- League: Southern Michigan League (1906–1907); Border League (1912–1913); Southern Michigan League (1914)

Major league affiliations
- Team: None

Minor league titles
- League titles (1): 1906

Team data
- Name: Mount Clemens Bathers (1906–1907, 1912–1914)
- Ballpark: Culver Park (1906–1907, 1912–1914)

The Mount Clemens Bathers were a Minor League Baseball team based in Mount Clemens, Michigan. Between 1906 and 1914, the Bathers played as members of the Class D level Southern Michigan League in 1906 and 1907, Border League in 1912 and 1913 and Southern Michigan League in 1914, winning the league championship in 1906.

The Mount Clemens teams hosted home minor league at Culver Park.

== History ==
=== 1906 & 1907 - Southern Michigan League ===
The 1906 Mount Clemens Bathers became charter members of the six–team Class D level Southern Michigan League, also called the "Southern Michigan Association". The Battle Creek Crickets, Jackson Convicts, Kalamazoo White Sox, Saginaw and Tecumseh Indians teams joined Mount Clemens as charter members of the league.

The Mount Clemens use of the "Bathers" moniker corresponds to the local landscape and industry in the era. Tourism related to the mineral baths was once a large industry, as at one time, the city had 11 bathhouses, and several hotels related to the mineral baths. The first bathhouse was built in 1873. Noted visitors included film actors Clark Gable and Mae West, athletes Babe Ruth and Jack Dempsey, news magnate William Randolph Hearst, and the Vanderbilt family. Today, one spa remains.

Beginning league play on May 6, 1906, the Mount Clemens Bathers won a championship in their first season of minor league play.. The Bathers ended the 1906 with a record of 69–34 to place first in the final Southern Michigan League standings. Managed by Walter Trombley, Mount Clemens finished 6.5 games ahead of the second place Kalamazoo White Sox (63–41), who were followed by the Tecumseh Indians (57–47), Jackson Convicts (52–52), Battle Creek Crickets (39–56) and Saginaw (34–60) Bill Roth of Mount Clemens led the league in batting average, hitting. 302 with a league leading 115 hits.

The 1907 Mount Clemens Bathers continued play in the Southern Michigan League. Mount Clemens ended the season in fourth place with a record of 52–51, playing under managers Joe Ganzel and George Thomas. The Bathers finished 13.5 games behind the first place Tecumseh Indians in the eight–team league. Mount Clemens folded from play in Southern Michigan League following the 1907 season. John Landry of Mount Clemens led the league with 60 runs, 120 hits and a batting average of .297, while teammate Irwin Gough led the league with 253 strikeouts.

=== 1912 to 1913 - Border League ===
In 1912, the Mount Clemens Bathers returned to minor league play. The Bathers became charter members of the Class D level Border League, which fielded teams from both the United States and Canada. The 1912 five–team league featured the Pontiac Indians, Port Huron Independents, Windsor and Wyandotte Alkalis joining Mount Clemens in league play.

In their first season of Border League play, the 1912 Mount Clemens Bathers placed third in the final league standings. Beginning play on May 30, 1912, the Mount Clemens ended the 1912 season with a record of 11–15, playing under returning manager Walter Trombley. The Bathers finished 9.0 games behind the first place Wyandotte Alkalis (19–5) in the final standings. The Pontiac Indians (14–9) placed second as the Mount Clemens Bathers (11–15) finished ahead of Windsor (9–14), and Port Huron Independents (7–17) in the final standings.

In August 1912, Mount Clemens pitchers threw no-hitters on back–to–back days. First, on August 14, 1912, Thomas Caesar of Mount Clemens threw the first no–hitter in a 12–0 victory over the Myrtle, Ontario team. Teammate Lou North threw a no–hitter against Myrtle the next day. North defeated Myrtle 5–0 on August 15, 1912.

The 1913 Mount Clemens Bathers folded before completing the Border League season. After beginning league play on May 24, 1913, the Bathers had a 7–9 record when the team folded on July 12, 1913. The Bathers were again managed by Walter Trombley as the Ypsilanti, Michigan team eventually won the title in the six–team league. The Border League folded following the 1913 season.

=== 1914 Southern Michigan League ===
After beginning the season without a team, the Mount Clemens Bathers briefly returned to play in 1914, their final minor league season. On July 10, 1914, the franchise returned to membership in the Southern Michigan League when the Lansing Senators of Lansing, Michigan, with a record of 33-35, moved to Mount Clemens to complete the season. The Lansing/Mount Clemens team finished with an overall record of 63–80 after compiling a 30–45 record while based in Mount Clemens. Playing the season under manager Jack Morrissey in both location, the Bathers finished 29.0 games behind the first place Bay City Beavers in the final standings of the ten–team league.

On August 21, 1914, Bravener of Mount Clemens threw an 11–inning no–hitter in a Southern Michigan League game against the Battle Creek Crickets. Bravener and Mount Clemens won the game 1–0.

Following the 1914 season, the Southern Michigan League permanently folded with the onset of World War II. Mount Clemens, Michigan has not hosted another minor league team.

== The ballpark ==
The Mount Clemens Bathers teams played home minor league games at Culver Park. The ballpark was also called "Crocker Field." The ballpark was located at Rathbone Street & Crocker Boulevard near the Clinton River in Mount Clemens, Michigan.

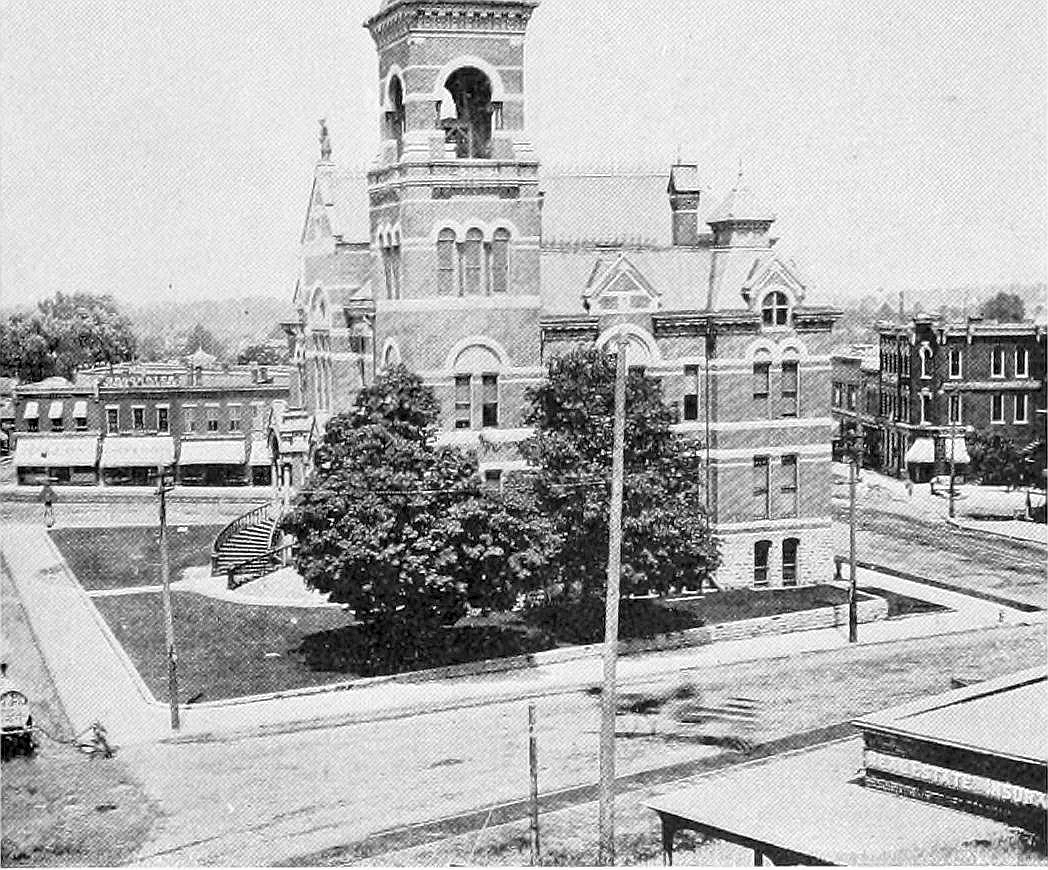
(1900) City Hall and downtown. Mount Clemens, Michigan

== Timeline ==
Year(s)	# Yrs.	Team	Level	League	Ballpark
1906–1907	2	Mount Clemens Bathers	Class D	Southern Michigan League	Culver Park
1912–1913	2	Mount Clemens Bathers	Class D	Border League	Culver Park
1914	1	Mount Clemens Bathers	Class C	Southern Michigan League	Culver Park

== Year-by–year records ==
Year	Record	Finish	Manager	Playoffs/notes
1906	69–34	1st	Walter Trombley	League champions
1907	52–51	4th	Joe Ganzel / George Thomas	No playoffs held
1912	11–15	3rd	Walter Trombley	No playoffs held
1913	7–9	NA	Walter Trombley	Team folded July 12
1914	63–80	7th	Jack Morrissey	Lansing (33–35) moved to Mount Clemens July 10

== Notable alumni ==
- Cliff Daringer (1907)
- Tom McCarthy (1906)
- Jack Morrissey (1914, MGR)
- Lou North (1912)
- Jack Ryan (1906)
- Vern Spencer (1914)

== See also ==
- Mount Clemens Bathers players
