= Geneva Cubs =

- 1977–1993; (1947–1951, 1958–1973, 1977–1993); Geneva, New York

Minor league affiliations
- Previous classes: Short Season – A (1967–1973, 1977–1993); Class A (1962–1966); Class D (1958–1961); Class C (1947–1951)
- Previous leagues: Border League (1947–1951); New York–Penn League (1958–1973, 1977–1993)

Major league affiliations
- Previous teams: Chicago Cubs (1977–1993); Minnesota Twins (1973); Texas Rangers (1972); Washington Senators (1970–1971); Pittsburgh Pirates (1969); Washington Senators (1963–1968); Cincinnati Reds (1960–1962); Cincinnati Redlegs (1958–1959); Brooklyn Dodgers (1949)

Minor league titles
- League titles: 5 (1949, 1958, 1978, 1987, 1992)

Team data
- Previous names: Geneva Cubs (1977–1993); Geneva Twins (1973); Geneva Senators (1970–1972); Geneva Pirates (1969); Geneva Senators (1963–1968); Geneva Redlegs (1958–1962); Geneva Robins (1948–1951); Geneva Red Birds (1947)
- Previous parks: McDonough Park

The Geneva Cubs was the final moniker of the minor league baseball team located in Geneva, New York. Their home stadium was at McDonough Park.

Geneva teams played in the Border League (1947–1951) and New York–Penn League (1958–1973, 1977–1993).

Geneva teams were an affiliate of the Chicago Cubs (1977–1993), Minnesota Twins (1973), Texas Rangers (1972), Washington Senators (1970–1971), Pittsburgh Pirates (1969), Washington Senators/Texas Rangers (1963–1968), Cincinnati Reds (1958–1962) and Brooklyn Dodgers (1949).

Baseball Hall of Fame member Tony Perez Played for Geneva in 1960–1961. All-time MLB hits leader Pete Rose played for Geneva in 1960.

== History ==
The Geneva Cubs were a member of the New York–Penn League. However the team can be traced back to 1947 as the Geneva Red Birds, a member of the Border League. The team's name changed a year later to the Geneva Robins and was affiliated with Brooklyn Dodgers in 1949. Geneva disbanded their team on June 26, 1951, and the rest of the league folded a few weeks later.

Geneva next played in 1958, rejoining as a member of the New York–Penn League and playing as the Geneva Redlegs, as affiliate the Cincinnati Redlegs. The affiliation lasted until 1963, when the team was renamed the Geneva Senators and became affiliated with the Washington Senators. In 1969 the team briefly became the Geneva Pirates and were affiliated with the Pittsburgh Pirates. The team once again took up the Senators name in 1970. In 1973 the team became an affiliate of the Minnesota Twins and were renamed the Geneva Twins. After a four-year hiatus the team took the Cubs name and began their affiliation with the Chicago Cubs from 1977 to 1993, after which time they moved to Williamsport, Pennsylvania. The franchise still exists today as the Williamsport Crosscutters.

== The ballpark ==
Beginning in 1958, Geneva teams played at McDonough Park. The ballpark is still in use as home to the Geneva RedWings, a collegiate summer baseball franchise and to the Hobart Statesmen baseball team. The address is 180 Lyceum Street, Geneva, New York, 14456.

== Timeline ==
Year(s)	# Yrs.	Team	Level	League	Affiliate
1947	1	Geneva Red Birds	Class C	Border League	None
1948	1	Geneva Robins	Class C	Border League	Brooklyn Dodgers
1949–1951	3	Geneva Robins	Class C	Border League	None
1958–1961	4	Geneva Redlegs	Class D	New York–Penn League	Cincinnati Reds
1962	1	Geneva Redlegs	Class A	New York–Penn League	Cincinnati Reds
1963–1968	6	Geneva Senators	Class A	New York–Penn League	Washington Senators
1969	1	Geneva Pirates	Class A	New York–Penn League	Pittsburgh Pirates
1970–1971	2	Geneva Senators	Class A	New York–Penn League	Washington Senators
1972	1	Geneva Senators	Class A	New York–Penn League	Texas Rangers
1973	1	Geneva Twins	Class A	New York–Penn League	Minnesota Twins
1977–1993	17	Geneva Cubs	Class A	New York–Penn League	Chicago Cubs

== Notable alumni ==
=== Baseball Hall of Fame alumni ===
- Tony Perez (1960–1961) Inducted, 2000

=== Notable alumni ===
- Brant Alyea (1962)
- Rich Amaral (1983)
- Dick Billings (1965)
- Dave Bristol (1958, MGR) Cincinnati Reds Hall of Fame
- Jim Bullinger (1986)
- Alex Cabrera (1993)
- Paul Casanova (1963–1964) MLB All-Star
- Jack Cassini (1960, MGR)
- Frank Castillo (1987)
- Mike Cubbage (1971)
- Doug Dascenzo (1985)
- Brian Doyle (1972)
- Scott Fletcher (1979)
- Matt Franco (1988)
- Owen Friend (1963, MGR)
- Gus Gil (1959)
- Doug Glanville (1991)
- Tom Grieve (1967) Texas Rangers Hall of Fame
- Mel Hall (1979)
- Mike Hargrove (1972) MLB All-Star; 1974 AL Rookie of the Year; Cleveland Indians Hall of Fame
- Billy Hatcher (1981)
- Bobby Jones (1967)
- Bruce Kison (1969)
- Karl Kuehl (1961–1962, MGR)
- Craig Lefferts (1979)
- Bill Madlock (1970) 3× MLB All-Star; 4× NL batting champion (1975, 1976, 1981, 1983)
- Dave Martinez (1983) Manager: 2019 World Series Champion Washington Nationals
- Don Mason (1965)
- Jim Mason (1968)
- Jamie Moyer (1984) MLB All-Star; Seattle Mariners Hall of Fame
- Camilo Pascual (1951) 7× MLB All-Star; Minnesota Twins Hall of Fame
- Greg Pryor (1971)
- Pete Rose (1960) Baseball All-time hits leader (4,256); Cincinnati Reds No. 14 retired; Cincinnati Reds Hall of Fame
- Chico Ruiz (1958)
- Art Shamsky (1960)
- Charlie Small (1949–1950, MGR)
- Dwight Smith (1985)
- Frank Taveras (1969)
- Kent Tekulve (1969) MLB All-Star
- Wayne Terwilliger (1964–1965, MGR)
- Stan Thomas (1971)
- Mike Thompson (1967)
- Cesar Tovar (1959, 1961)
- Steve Trachsel (1991) MLB All-Star
- Gary Ward (1973) 2× MLB All-Star
- Rick Wilkins (1987)
- John Wockenfuss (1967–1968)
- Al Woods (1973)
