= Manny McIntyre =

Canadian professional athlete

- McIntyre in baseball uniform, c. 1946
- Born: Vincent Churchill McIntyre; October 4, 1918; Devon, New Brunswick, Canada
- Died: June 13, 2011 (aged 92); Candiac, Quebec, Canada
- Occupation: Professional athlete
- Awards: Canada's Sports Hall of Fame (2015); New Brunswick Sports Hall of Fame (1997)
Ice hockey career
- Height: 6 ft 0 in (183 cm)
- Weight: 195 lb (88 kg; 13 st 13 lb)
- Position: Left wing
- Shot: Left
- Playing career: 1933–1955
- Baseball career
- Shortstop
- Bats: Unknown Throws: Right
Member of the Canadian
Baseball Hall of Fame
- Induction: 2021

Vincent Churchill "Manny" McIntyre (October 4, 1918 – June 13, 2011) was a Canadian professional athlete who played both ice hockey and baseball. He is an inductee of the New Brunswick Sports Hall of Fame, Canada's Sports Hall of Fame, and the Canadian Baseball Hall of Fame.

McIntyre was a member of the "Black Aces", the first all-black line in professional hockey, with brothers Ossie and Herb Carnegie. They played together in various leagues including one season in France where they became a big draw and helped set an attendance record for French ice hockey. In 1946, McIntyre became the first Black Canadian to play professional baseball, as a shortstop for the Sherbrooke Canadians of the Border League.

== Early life ==
McIntyre was born in 1918 in Devon, New Brunswick. (Note: Devon was absorbed into the city of Fredericton in 1945.) As a child, he began playing both ice hockey and baseball. He played shinny, a form of pick-up hockey, on frozen ponds with wooden pucks.

== Ice hockey career ==
McIntyre played in the Porcupine Mines Senior Hockey League, where he was first teamed with brothers Ossie and Herb Carnegie. They formed the first recorded all black line in hockey history. The trio became known as the "Black Aces". The trio gained notoriety in North America and moved to France to play for Racing Club de Paris, becoming the first professional black players to play in Europe. The Black Aces became a big draw while playing in Europe attracting large crowds for each of their games. Including a game against the British National team which drew 20,612 spectators, which set an ice hockey attendance record in France. When the season ended they were offered a contract to stay in with the team, but chose to return to North America joining the Sherbrooke Saints of the Quebec Senior Hockey League (QSHL) for the 1948–49 season. Upon joining the QSHL they became the first all-black line in professional history. For the 1949–50 season McIntyre moved to the Moncton Hawks of the Maritime Major Hockey League (MMHL). He set a career high in goals with 36. In 1950 he was traded to the Saint John Beavers, where he moved from a winger to defence. According to the Society for International Hockey Research McIntyre compiled 187 goals, 278 assists, for 465 points in 468 games played during his career.

== Baseball career ==
McIntyre's baseball career was similar to his hockey career as he moved from league to league with regularity. He began playing with Fredericton Capitals of the New Brunswick Senior Baseball League, before moving on to Nova Scotia. Playing as a shortstop, McIntyre set a career high .385 batting average in 1943 playing for the Halifax Shipyards. The following season he helped the Shipyards win a Halifax Defense Baseball League championship. McIntyre played for Trois-Rivieres team in the Quebec Provincial League in 1945.

For the 1946 season, McIntyre signed a contract with the Sherbrooke Canadians of the Border League, thereby becoming the first Black Canadian to sign a professional baseball contract. The Canadians were affiliated with the Rochester Red Wings of the International League; Rochester itself was a farm team of the St. Louis Cardinals. McIntyre later became the first Black Canadian to play professional baseball, as he hit .310 with one home run and two doubles in 30 games, collecting 40 hits in 129 at bats for Sherbrooke.

== Personal life ==
After his playing career McIntyre worked at the Dorval International Airport. He was elected into the New Brunswick Sports Hall of Fame in 1997. McIntyre died on June 13, 2011, in Candiac, Quebec, at the age of 92. McIntyre was posthumously inducted into Canada's Sports Hall of Fame in 2015, the Maritime Sport Hall of Fame in 2020, and the Canadian Baseball Hall of Fame in 2021.
