= Marc Albert =

Marc Albert may refer to:

- Marc Albert (tennis) (born 1960), Dutch tennis player
- Marc Albert (volleyball) (born 1961), Canadian Olympic volleyball player
