= Pontiac Indians =

- 1912–1913; Pontiac, Michigan

Minor league affiliations
- Class: Class D (1912–1913)
- League: Border League (1912–1913)

Major league affiliations
- Team: None

Minor league titles
- League titles (0): None

Team data
- Name: Pontiac Indians (1912–1913)
- Ballpark: Wisner Park (1912–1913)

The Pontiac Indians were a minor league baseball team based in Pontiac, Michigan. In 1912 and 1913, the Indians played exclusively as members of the Class D level Border League, hosting home games at Wisner Park.

== History ==
In 1912, the Pontiac Indians became charter members of the Class D level Border League, which featured teams from both the United States and Canada. The 1912 five–team league featured the Mount Clemens Bathers, Port Huron Independents, Windsor and Wyandotte Alkalis joining the Indians in league beginning league play on May 30, 1912.

In their first season of play, the 1912 Pontiac Indians placed second in the Border League standings. Beginning play on May 30, 1912, the Pontiac Indians ended the 1912 season with a record of 14–9, playing under manager Henry McIntoch. Pontiac finished 4.5 games behind the first place Wyandotte Alkalis (19–5) and ahead of Windsor (9–14), the Mount Clemens Bathers (11–15) and Port Huron Independents (7–17) in the final standings.

The Pontiac Indians played their final season in 1913. Beginning play on May 24, 1913, the Pontiac Indians placed fourth in the 1913 the Border League standings. Pontiac ended the 1913 season with a 13–18 record as Henry McIntosh returned as manager. The Indians finished 9.5 games behind the first place Ypsilanti, Michigan team in the six–team league.

The Border League folded after the 1913 season. Pontiac, Michigan has not hosted another minor league team.

== The ballpark ==
Pontiac teams played minor league home games at Wisner Park. Wisner Park was located at Oakland Avenue & Summit Street near Wisner Street, Pontiac, Michigan. Today, Wisner Stadium serves as a multi–use stadium for local high schools and other events.

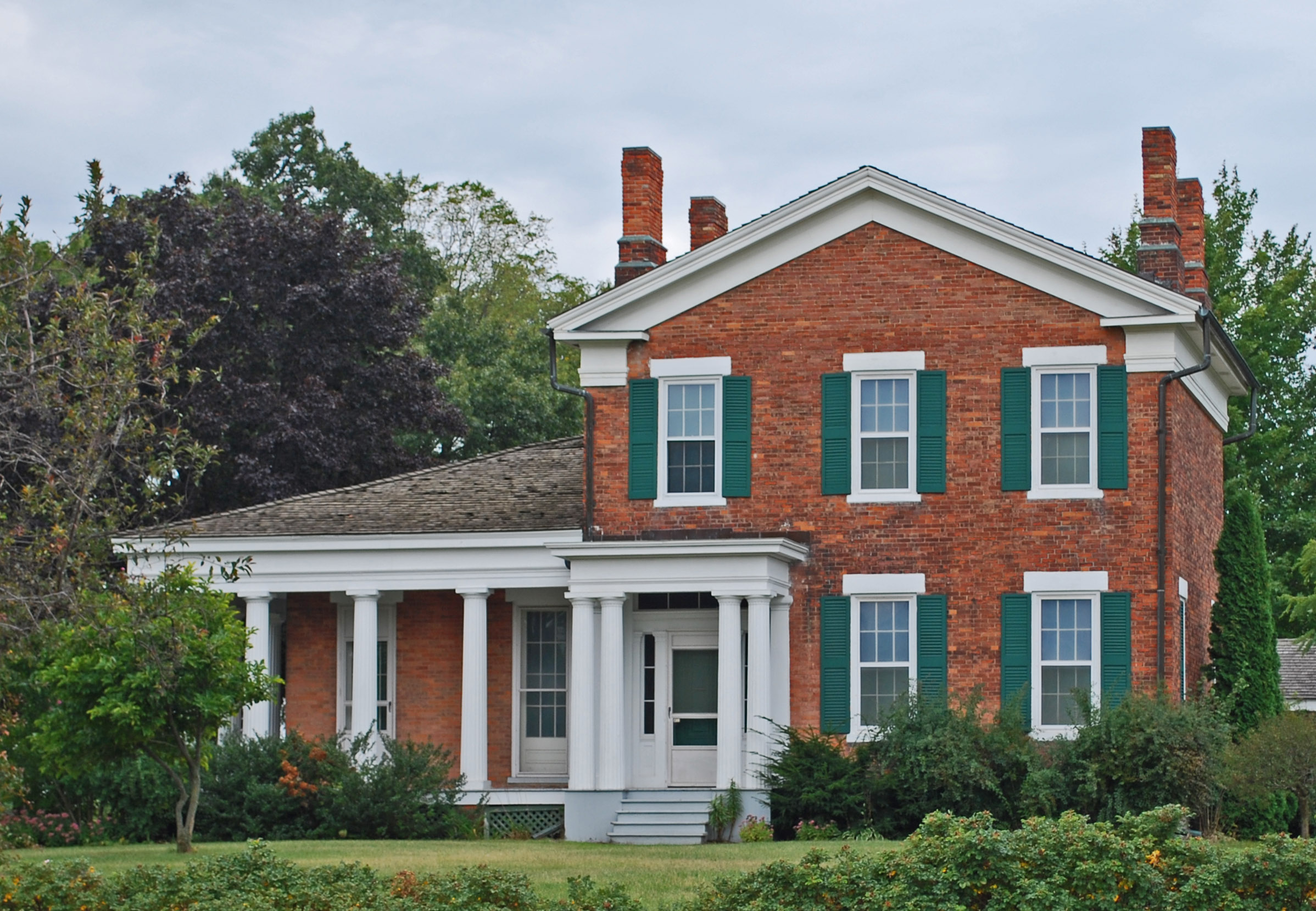
(2010) Historic Wisner House Pontiac, MI

== Timeline ==
Year(s)	# Yrs.	Team	Level	League	Ballpark
1912–1913	2	Pontiac Indians	Class D	Border League	Wisner Park

== Year–by–year records ==
Year	Record	Finish	Manager	Playoffs/notes
1912	14–9	2nd	Henry McIntoch	No playoffs held
1913	13–18	4th	Henry McIntoch	No playoffs held

== Notable alumni ==
- Bill Harper (1912)
- Vern Spencer (1913)
- Pontiac Indians players
