= Gilles Dubé =

Canadian ice hockey player

- Born: June 2, 1927; Sherbrooke, Quebec, Canada
- Died: September 29, 2016 (aged 89); Sherbrooke, Quebec, Canada
- Height: 5 ft 10 in (178 cm)
- Weight: 165 lb (75 kg; 11 st 11 lb)
- Position: Left wing
- Shot: Left
- Played for: Montreal Canadiens; Detroit Red Wings
- Playing career: 1948–1962

Joseph Albert Gilles Dubé (June 2, 1927 – September 29, 2016) was a Canadian professional ice hockey forward who played 12 regular season games in the National Hockey League for the Montreal Canadiens during the 1949–50 season. He also played 2 playoff games with the Detroit Red Wings in the 1954 Stanley Cup playoffs. With Detroit, he won the Stanley Cup that year. The rest of his career, which lasted from 1948 to 1962, was spent in the minor leagues.

Dubé also played professional baseball as an outfielder, first with the Sherbrooke Canadians in 1946, then with the Sherbrooke Athletics in 1948 and 1949.

== Career statistics ==
=== Regular season and playoffs ===
			Regular season					Playoffs
Season	Team	League	GP	G	A	Pts	PIM	GP	G	A	Pts	PIM
1945–46	Sherbrooke Randies	QPHL	7	1	3	4	0	—	—	—	—	—
1946–47	Montreal Junior Canadiens	QJAHA	12	16	1	17	6	2	1	2	3	2
1946–47	Montreal Junior Canadiens	M-Cup	—	—	—	—	—	2	1	2	3	2
1947–48	Sherbrooke Saints	QPHL	43	31	41	72	44	8	6	10	16	13
1948–49	Sherbrooke Red Raiders	QSHL	62	30	56	86	56	12	3	7	10	6
1949–50	Montreal Canadiens	NHL	12	1	2	3	2	—	—	—	—	—
1949–50	Cincinnati Mohawks	AHL	46	19	18	37	12	—	—	—	—	—
1950–51	Cincinnati Mohawks	AHL	62	16	26	42	29	—	—	—	—	—
1951–52	Sherbrooke Saints	QSHL	51	17	15	32	33	11	5	6	11	10
1952–53	Sherbrooke Saints	QSHL	60	21	32	53	55	7	3	2	5	14
1953–54	Sherbrooke Saints	QSHL	72	17	45	62	68	5	1	5	6	4
1953–54	Detroit Red Wings	NHL	—	—	—	—	—	2	0	0	0	0
1954–55	Shawinigan Falls Cataractes	QSHL	56	18	41	59	30	13	1	7	8	7
1955–56	Shawinigan Falls Cataractes	QSHL	64	37	54	91	68	11	3	5	8	2
1956–57	Shawinigan Falls Cataractes	QSHL	58	12	31	45	38	—	—	—	—	—
1960–61	Sherbrooke Cantons	QUE Sr	30	14	22	36	30	3	1	1	2	19
1961–62	Sherbrooke Castors	ETSHL	18	6	17	23	18	7	0	8	8	8
QSHL totals			473	152	274	426	348	59	16	32	48	43
NHL totals			12	1	2	3	2	2	0	0	0	0
