= New Brunswick Sports Hall of Fame =

- Temple de la Renommée Sportive du Nouveau-Brunswick

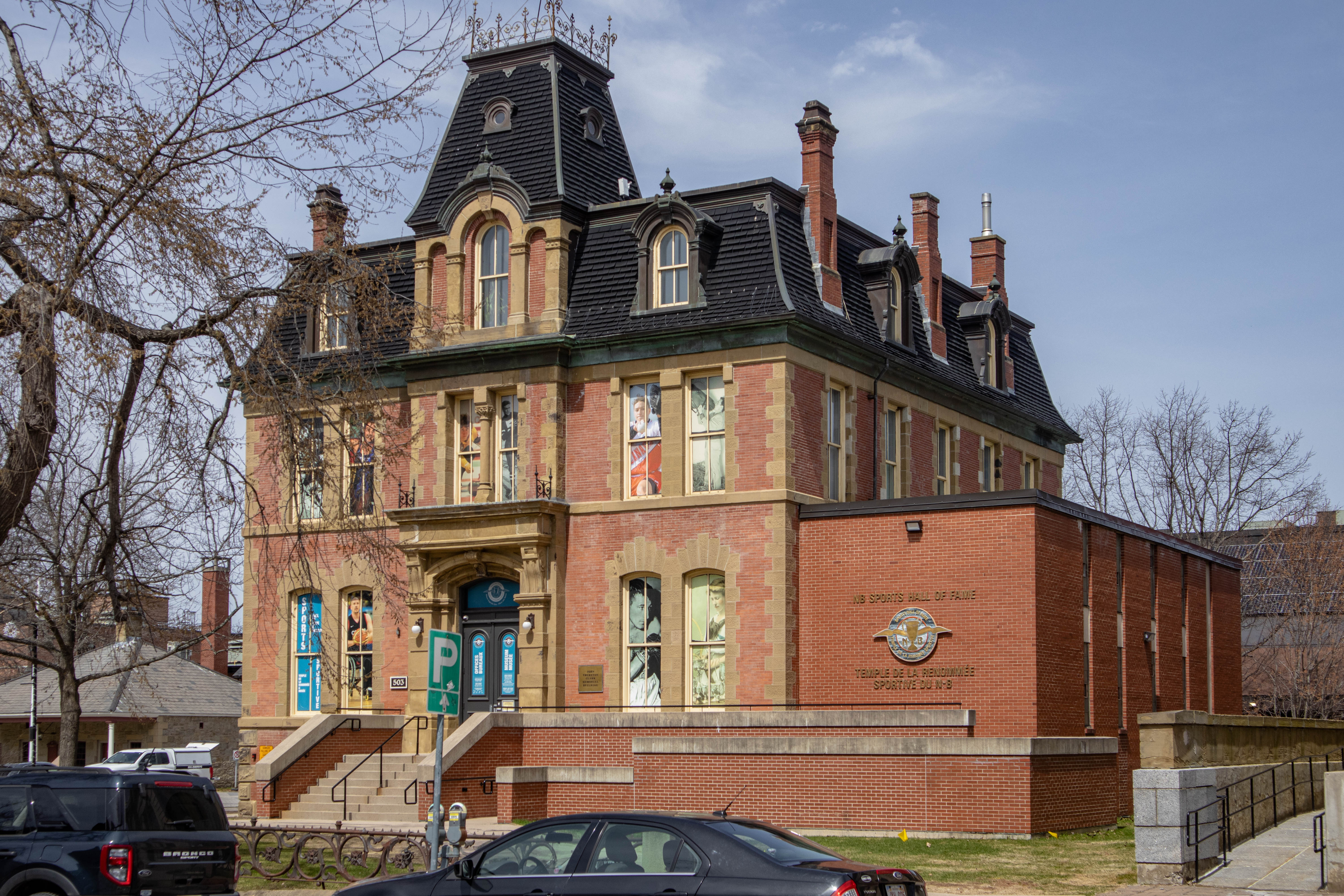
- The museum building in 2025
- Established: 1970
- Location: 503 Queen Street; Fredericton, New Brunswick, Canada
- Coordinates: 45.9622°N 66.6404°W
- Type: Sports hall of fame
- Executive director: Jamie Wolverton
- Chairperson: Andrew McLeod
- Website: www.nbsportshalloffame.com

The New Brunswick Sports Hall of Fame (French: Temple de la Renommée Sportive du Nouveau-Brunswick) is a provincial sports hall of fame and museum in Fredericton, New Brunswick. The sports hall of fame honours athletes, teams, and sport builders that are from the Canadian province of New Brunswick. New nominees to the hall of fame are inducted to the hall of fame on an annual basis.

Established in 1970, the organization operates as an independent non-profit charity with a mandate to "preserve and celebrate" the sports heritage of New Brunswick. The New Brunswick Sports Hall of Fame museum holds exhibits about inducted builders, individual athletes, and groups/teams.

== Museum ==
The Sports Hall of Fame operates a Sports Museum at 503 Queen Street in the province's capital city of Fredericton. The museum is situated within the John Thurston Clark Memorial Building. The museum is equipped with interactive exhibits and one of the largest collection of charcoal portraits in the province, one for each of its Hall of Fame inductees.

The building was originally opened as a customs and post office in 1881. The building was later named after the son of William George Clark, the Lieutenant Governor of New Brunswick. The New Brunswick Sports Hall of Fame moved into the John Thurston Clark Memorial Building in 1976.

== Hall of Famers ==
As of 2019, over 250 in individuals and teams have been inducted in the New Brunswick Sports Hall of Fame. Inductees are formally categorized into two categories, builders or players, the latter category including individual athletes and entire groups or teams.

Eligibility into the hall for athletes is determined by distinction brought to the province, whereas eligibility for builders is determined by the nominee's contribution to the development of the sport in New Brunswick. In order to be inducted in the hall of fame, candidates must first be nominated, with nomination of deceased individuals requiring further consent from the nominee's family. Nomination deadlines for each induction year is 30 November.

=== Notable inductees ===
Individuals

- Marc Albert - volleyball
- Earle Avery - harness racing
- Norman Buchanan (MC) - baseball. An army officer, politician, business man. He served during the Second World War and was awarded the Military Cross with two bars, an extremely high honour held by only 23 other Commonwealth Officers.
- Rhéal Cormier - Major League Baseball pitcher
- J. Howard Crocker - Educator for the YMCA, and executive for the Amateur Athletic Union of Canada
- Tony Currie - National Hockey League player
- Mabel DeWare - National curling champion
- Gordie Drillon - National Hockey League player
- Yvon Durelle - boxing champion
- Dave Durepos - wheelchair basketball
- Dick Gamble - National Hockey League player
- Charles Gorman - speed skater
- Danny Grant - National Hockey League player
- Bill Harris - Major League Baseball player
- Buster Harvey - ice hockey player
- Russ Howard - Olympic Gold Medal in curling
- Marianne Limpert - swimmer
- Willy Logan - speed skater
- Peter Maher - ice hockey announcer
- Greg Malone - National Hockey League player
- Manny McIntyre - hockey and baseball player
- Roland McLenahan - National Hockey League
- Roland Melanson - National Hockey League player
- Willie O'Ree - first Black player in the National Hockey League
- Scott Pellerin - National Hockey League player
- Matt Stairs - Major League Baseball player
- Don Sweeney - National Hockey League player
- Milaine Thériault - cross-country skier
- Ron Turcotte - Hall of Fame jockey who rode Secretariat to the Triple Crown
- Stacy Wilson - Olympic women's hockey player

Groups/teams

- The Paris Crew - world rowing champions
- Campbellton Tigers - 1972 ice hockey club
- Campbellton Tigers - 1977 ice hockey club
- Moncton Hawks - 1970 ice hockey club
- Wayne Tallon, Mike Kennedy, Mike Flannery, Wade Blanchard - 2014 World Senior Curling Champions

== See also ==
- Canada's Sports Hall of Fame
- Alberta Sports Hall of Fame
- BC Sports Hall of Fame
- Manitoba Sports Hall of Fame
- Nova Scotia Sports Hall of Fame
- Ontario Sports Hall of Fame
- List of museums in New Brunswick
