= McDonough Park =

Stadium in Geneva, New York, U.S.

Coordinates: 42.868388°N 77.001103°W

- Interactive map of McDonough Park
- Former names: Shuron Park
- Location: 14301 180 Lyceum St. Geneva, NY
- Capacity: 3,000
- Field size: 325' (L), 400' (C), 320' (R)

Construction
- Opened: 1958

Tenants
- Geneva Redlegs (NY-PL) 1958-1962; Geneva Senators (NY-PL) 1963-1968, 1970-1972; Geneva Pirates (NY-PL) 1969; Geneva Twins (NY-PL) 1973; Geneva Cubs (NY-PL) 1977-1993; Geneva Knights (NCBL) 1994-1998; Geneva Redlegs (NCBL) 1999-2001; Geneva Lakers (NYCBL) 2002; Geneva Red Wings (NYCBL) 2003-2015, (PGCBL) 2016-Present; Geneva Twins (NYCBL) 2012-2015; Hobart Statesmen (NCAA D3) 1958-1995, 2023-Present

McDonough Park is a stadium in Geneva, New York. It is primarily used for baseball and was home to the Geneva Cubs. It opened in 1958 with seating for 3,000.

The ballpark remains serviceable and plays host to two different teams, the Red Wings of the Perfect Game Collegiate Baseball League, and the revived Hobart Statesmen Baseball team.

McDonough "alumni" include Pete Rose and Tony Perez.
