= Billy Kelly (baseball) =

American baseball player (1886–1940)

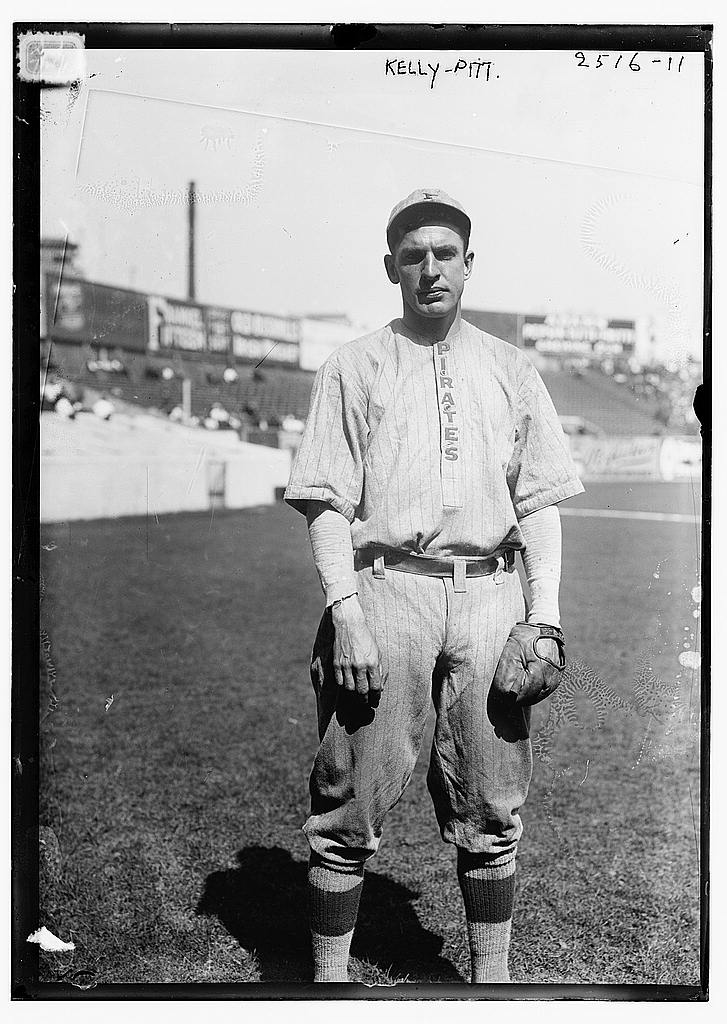
- Catcher
- Born: May 1, 1886; Baltimore, Maryland, U.S.
- Died: June 3, 1940 (aged 54); Detroit, Michigan, U.S.
- Batted: Right Threw: Right

MLB debut
- May 2, 1910, for the St. Louis Cardinals

Last MLB appearance
- October 5, 1913, for the Pittsburgh Pirates

MLB statistics
- Batting average: .290
- Home runs: 1
- Runs batted in: 21
- Stats at Baseball Reference

Teams
- St. Louis Cardinals (1910); Pittsburgh Pirates (1911–1913)

William Joseph Kelly (May 1, 1886 – June 3, 1940) was an American professional baseball player. He played in parts of four seasons in Major League Baseball for the St. Louis Cardinals and Pittsburgh Pirates from 1910 through 1913. He also managed the minor league Port Huron Saints in 1922. Kelly was born in Baltimore, Maryland and died of lung cancer in Detroit, Michigan at the age of 54.

In a brief 4 year, 104 game major league career, Kelly compiled a .290 batting average with 32 runs, 1 home run and 21 RBI.
