= Sherbrooke Canadians =

Defunct professional baseball team

- (1946); Sherbrooke, Quebec

Minor league affiliations
- Class: Class C
- League: Border League

Team data
- Ballpark: Sherbrooke Ball Park (Note: Also referred to as "Stade Amedée-Roy I", to differentiate it from the present-day Stade Amedée-Roy III.)

The Sherbrooke Canadians were a minor league baseball team in the Border League during the 1946 season. The team was based in Sherbrooke, Quebec, and was affiliated with the Rochester Red Wings of the International League; Rochester itself was a farm team of the St. Louis Cardinals. The Canadians played at Sherbrooke Ball Park, a facility that burned down in September 1951.

The Canadians played to a record of 46–71, a .393 winning percentage, and finished last in the six-team league. The franchise folded in September 1946 due to lack of financial support, and the league announced in January 1947 that the team would not return for a second season.

One of the players on the team was shortstop Manny McIntyre, who had a .310 batting average in 30 games. With Sherbrooke, McIntyre became the first Black Canadian to play professional baseball. He was inducted to the Canadian Baseball Hall of Fame in 2021.

Also on the team were outfielders Gilles Dubé and Norm Dussault, both of whom played for the Montreal Canadiens of the National Hockey League (NHL). Pitcher Stan Landes later was an umpire in the National League from 1955 to 1972.
