= Wyandotte Alkalis =

- 1912–1913; Wyandotte, Michigan

Minor league affiliations
- Class: Class D (1912–1913)
- League: Border League (1912–1913)

Major league affiliations
- Team: None

Minor league titles
- League titles (1): 1912

Team data
- Name: Wyandotte Alkalis (1912–1913)
- Ballpark: Alkali Park (1912–1913)

The Wyandotte Alkalis were a minor league baseball team based in Wyandotte, Michigan. In 1912 and 1913, the Alkalis, named for a locally based company, played exclusively as members of the Class D level Border League, winning the 1912 league championship.

The Wyandotte teams hosted home minor league games at Alkali Park.

== History ==
In 1912, the Wyandotte, Michigan based Wyandotte Alkalis became charter members of the five–team Class D level Border League. The Border League featured teams from both the United States and Canada. The 1912 league featured the Mount Clemens Bathers, Pontiac Indians, Port Huron Independents and Windsor teams joining the Wyandotte Alkalis in Border League play.

The "Alkalis" moniker derives from local business and the Michigan Alkali Company. The company headquarters was located along Biddle Street in Wyandotte. The Michigan Alkali Company owned much of the property in Wyandotte, Michigan during the era, including Alkali Park, the Wyandotte Alkalis' home ballpark.

In their first season of play, the 1912 Wyandotte Alkalis won the Border League Championship. Beginning league play on May 30, 1912, Wyandotte had a final record 19–5 to win the title under manager H.R. Browne. Wyandotte finished 4.5 games ahead of the second place Pontiac Indians (14–9), followed by the Mount Clemens Bathers (11–15), Windsor (9–14) and Port Huron Independents (7–17) in the final standings.

The Wyandotte Alkalis played their final season in 1913. Beginning play on May 24, 1913, the Alkalis placed second in the 1913 Border League standings. Wyandotte ended the 1913 season with a 24–13 record, as manager H.R. Browne returned. The Alkalis finished 1.5 games behind the first place Ypsilanti, Michigan team in the six–team league final standings.

The Border League folded after the 1913 season and never reformed. Wyandotte, Michigan has not hosted another minor league team.

== The ballpark ==
The Wyandotte Alkalis played 1912 and 1913 home minor league games at Alkali Park. The ballpark was reported to have opened on May 16, 1901, built by the Michigan Alkali Company, namesake of the team. The ballpark site today is a portion of the 9–hole Wyandotte Shores Golf Course, located at 3625 Biddle Avenue Wyandotte, Michigan.

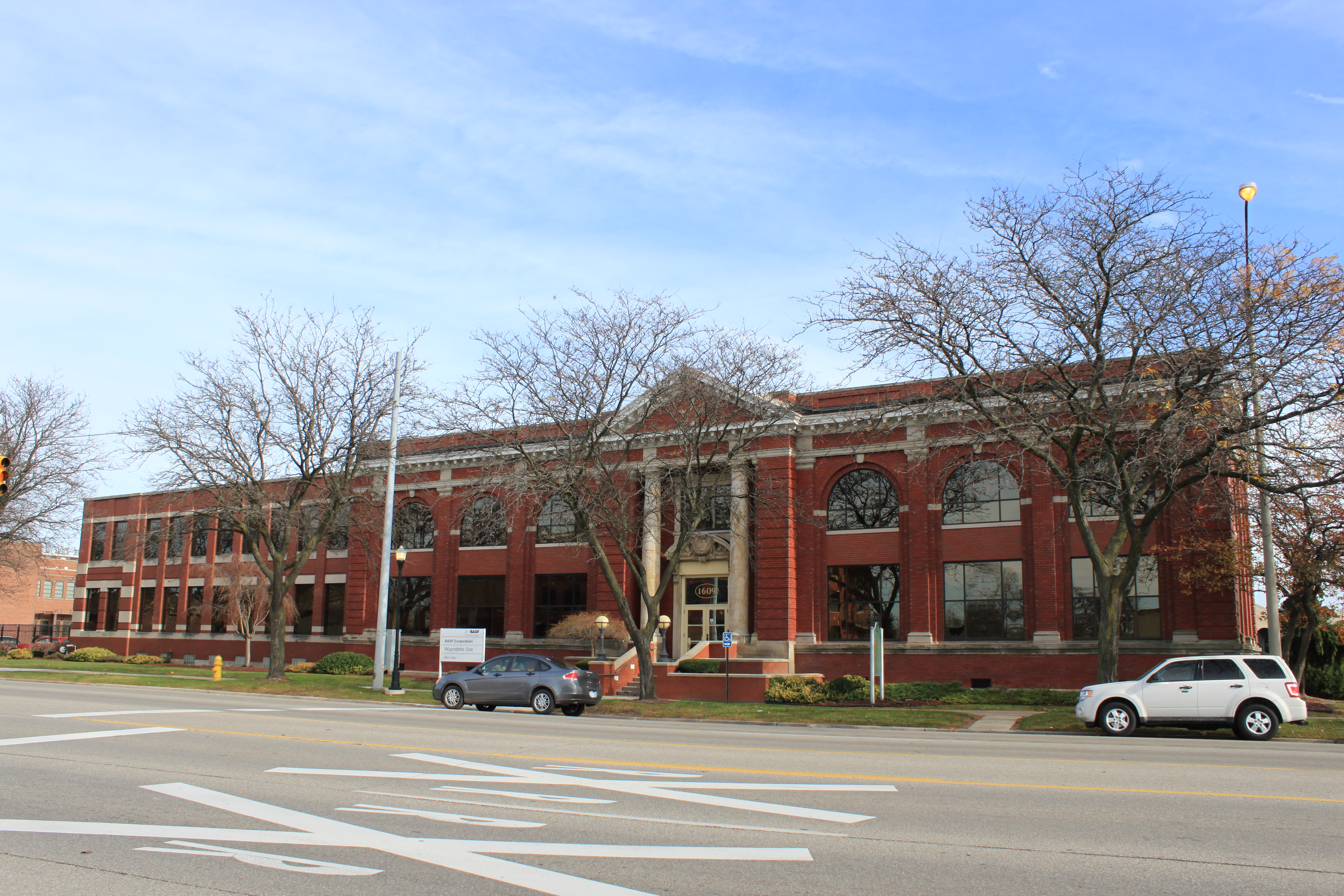
(2011) Michigan Alkali Administration Building Historic Site. Wyandotte, Michigan

== Timeline ==
Year(s)	# Yrs.	Team	Level	League	Ballpark
1912–1913	2	Wyandotte Alkalis	Class D	Border League	Alkali Park

== Year–by–year records ==
Year	Record	Finish	Manager	Playoffs/notes
1912	14–9	1st	H.R. Browne	League champions
1913	24–13	2nd	H.R. Browne	No playoffs held

== Notable alumni ==
No alumni of the Wyandotte Alkalis reached the major leagues.
