= Jack Morrissey =

American baseball player (1876–1936)

- Second baseman
- Born: May 2, 1876; Lansing, Michigan, U.S.
- Died: October 30, 1936 (aged 60); Lansing, Michigan, U.S.
- Batted: Both Threw: Right

MLB debut
- September 18, 1902, for the Cincinnati Reds

Last MLB appearance
- July 6, 1903, for the Cincinnati Reds

MLB statistics
- Batting average: .258
- Home runs: 0
- Runs batted in: 12
- Stats at Baseball Reference

Teams
- Cincinnati Reds (1902–1903)

John Albert Morrissey (May 2, 1876 – October 30, 1936), nicknamed "King", was an American professional baseball player from Lansing, Michigan who played parts of two season in Major League Baseball for the Cincinnati Reds from 1902 to 1903.

== Career ==
Morrissey began his professional baseball career at the age of 19 when he joined the local Lansing Senators of the Michigan State League in 1895, the only year of operation as a class "B" league in the 19th century. The following season, he travelled to Tacoma, Washington to play for the Rabbits of the class "C" New Pacific League. In 1898, he was playing in the Canadian League for the Chatham Reds. Morrissey's next recorded playing period began in 1901, when he a member of the Grand Rapids Furniture Makers of the Western Association, a class "A" league that was in operation for one season.

In 1902, Morrissey played for two different minor league teams; the Minneapolis Millers of the American Association and the Muskegon Reds of the Michigan State League. Toward the end of the 1902 season, he was signed by the Cincinnati Reds of the National League, and made his Major League Baseball debut on September 18. For the remainder of the season, he appeared in 12 games, 11 of which were as their second baseman, collected 11 hits in 39 at bats for a .282 batting average. He re-signed with the Reds for the 1903 season, appearing in 29 games, 17 at second base and 8 as an outfielder, before playing final major league contest on July 6. His final major league career totals include 41 games played while collecting 33 hits in 128 at bats for a .258 batting average. He played out the rest of the 1903 season with the Columbus Senators of the American Association, recently upgraded to a class "A" league, and the Lawrence Colts of the class "B" New England League.

He relocated to Grand Rapids to play for the Orphans of the class "B" Central League for two seasons from 1904 to 1905, and was the club's player-manager during his first season. From 1907 to 1914, he returned to the Lansing Senators, now of the class "D" Southern Michigan League. He was the team's manager all eight seasons with the Senators, while playing in 1907, 1908, and 1910.

He died in his hometown of Lansing at the age of 60 on October 30, 1936, and is interred at the city's Mount Hope Cemetery.
