= Newt Hunter =

American baseball player (1880–1963)

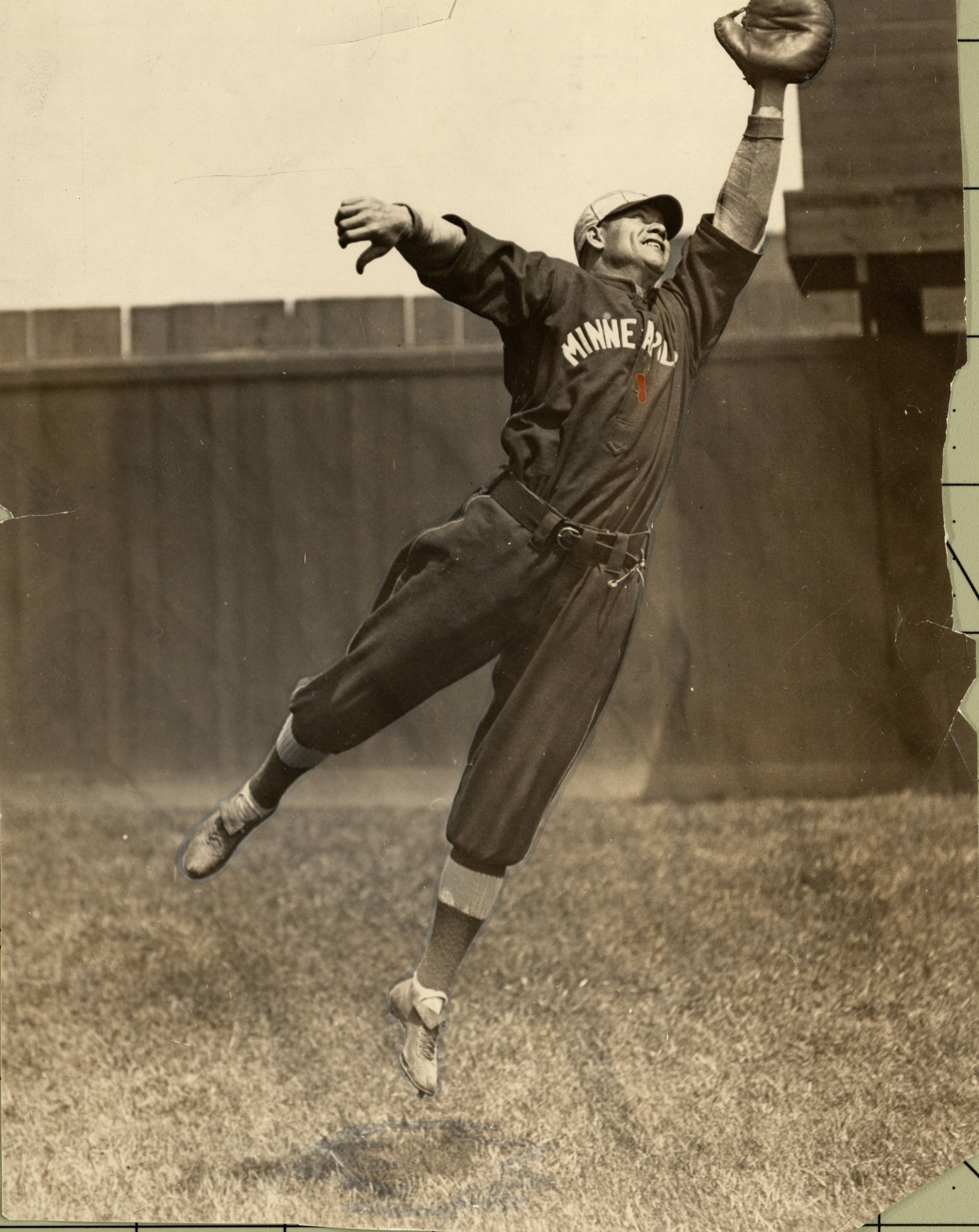
- Hunter in 1914
- First baseman
- Born: January 5, 1880; Chillicothe, Ohio, U.S.
- Died: October 26, 1963 (aged 83); Columbus, Ohio, U.S.
- Batted: Right Threw: Right

MLB debut
- April 12, 1911, for the Pittsburgh Pirates

Last MLB appearance
- September 6, 1911, for the Pittsburgh Pirates

MLB statistics
- Batting average: .254
- Home runs: 2
- Runs batted in: 24
- Stats at Baseball Reference

Teams
- Pittsburgh Pirates (1911)

Frederick Creighton "Newt" Hunter (January 5, 1880 – October 26, 1963) was an American first baseman, coach and scout in Major League Baseball. He appeared in 65 games for the Pittsburgh Pirates in 1911, and served as a coach for the St. Louis Cardinals (1920) and Philadelphia Phillies (1928–1929, 1932–1933).

Hunter was a native of Chillicothe, Ohio; he batted and threw right-handed and was listed as 6 feet (1.8 m) tall and 180 pounds (82 kg). During his stint with the 1911 Pirates, Hunter, then 31, collected 53 hits, including ten doubles, six triples and two home runs. He had a lengthy minor-league career as a player and playing manager (1903–1918, 1924).

== See also ==
- List of St. Louis Cardinals coaches
