= Marc Albert (volleyball) =

Canadian volleyball player

- Born: November 15, 1961 (age 63); Caraquet, New Brunswick, Canada
- Education: Université de Moncton

Marc Albert (born November 15, 1961) is a former Canadian Olympic volleyball player from Caraquet, New Brunswick.

Albert led his Polyvalente Louis-Mailloux to New Brunswick provincial high school volleyball championships in 1978 and 1979. While attending the Université de Moncton he was named to the Canadian junior national team and in 1981 relocated to Calgary to join the senior national team. He left the team, however, after 18 months to become a Calgary police officer. He returned to the program in 1985 but left again after only a year to focus on work and family. In 1989, however, an arrangement with the Calgary police force allowed him to return to national program.

Albert was named tournament MVP of the 1992 pre-Olympic qualifying tournament. At the Olympics, the Canadians barely missed on advancing to the quarterfinals losing three 5-set matches along with defeating France. They ended the tournament losing the 9-10 place game to South Korea. Albert's personal accolades also include being the third-highest ranked attackers and fifth-ranked receiver in the 1992 World Volleyball League.

In club volleyball during the 1980s, his Canuck Stuff Club of Calgary was a three-time Canadian senior champion and Albert was a five-time all-star selection at the tournament. After the 1992 Olympics he returned to New Brunswick where he has been involved in teaching and coaching volleyball in grade school and university.

As of 2001 he was assistant coach at the Université de Moncton. Albert was inducted into the New Brunswick Sports Hall of Fame in 2001. He has worked as sales manager for the Edmundston-Grand Falls-Campbellton area for the financial services company Assumption Life.
