= Marty Becker =

American baseball player (1889-1957)

- Center fielder
- Born: December 25, 1889; Tiffin, Ohio, U.S.
- Died: September 25, 1957 (aged 67); Cincinnati, Ohio, U.S.
- Batted: Right Threw: Right

MLB debut
- September 8, 1915, for the New York Giants

Last MLB appearance
- October 6, 1915, for the New York Giants

MLB statistics
- Batting average: .250
- Home runs: 0
- Runs batted in: 3
- Stats at Baseball Reference

Teams
- New York Giants (1915)

Martin Henry Becker (December 25, 1889 – September 25, 1957) was an American Major League Baseball center fielder who played for the New York Giants in 1915.
