= Olav Kollevoll =

American athlete & coach (1923–2010)

Biographical details
- Born: January 7, 1923; Kristiansand, Norway
- Died: September 11, 2010 (aged 87)

Playing career
- 1942–1944: Colgate
- 1949–1950: Clinton Comets
- Position: Defenseman

Coaching career (HC unless noted)
- 1950–1955: St. Lawrence
- 1955–1965: Colgate

Administrative career (AD unless noted)
- 1965–1989: Lafayette

Head coaching record
- Overall: 153–91–4 (.625)
- Tournaments: 0–4 (.000)

Accomplishments and honors

Championships
- 3 Tri-State League (1952, 1954–1955)

Records
- Military career
- Allegiance: United States
- Branch: United States Navy
- Service years: 1945
- Rank: Second lieutenant

Olav "Ole" Bernt Kollevoll (January 7, 1923 – September 11, 2010) was an American ice hockey, baseball and football player and coach.

== Career ==
Born in Kristiansand, Norway, Kollevoll emigrated to the United States with his parents and grew up in Brooklyn. Kollevoll began attending Colgate University in the fall of 1941, playing ice hockey, baseball, and football in his time there. He was an initiate of Delta Upsilon. After graduating from an accelerated program in 1945 Kollevoll joined the United States Navy towards the end of World War II. After his tour was over he began a short professional career in both baseball and hockey before retiring following an injury in 1948.

Kollevoll became the head coach at St. Lawrence in 1950 for both the baseball and hockey squads. During his time there he attained his master's degree while leading the Saints to their first two appearances in the NCAA Division I Men's Ice Hockey Championship. In 1955 Kollevoll returned to his alma mater, taking over as head coach for the ice hockey and freshman football clubs. In 1957 Colgate's hockey program returned to varsity status and became a founding member of ECAC Hockey four years later.

Kollevoll left Colgate in 1965 to become the athletic director at Lafayette College, remaining there until his retirement in 1989. He died on September 11, 2010.

== Head coaching record ==
Record table
Season	Team	Overall	Conference	Standing	Postseason
St. Lawrence Saints (Tri-State League) (1950–1955)
1950-51	St. Lawrence	8-6-0	3-2-0	3rd	
1951-52	St. Lawrence	15-5-0	6-1-0	1st	NCAA Consolation Game (Loss)
1952-53	St. Lawrence	12-6-0	3-2-0	2nd	
1953-54	St. Lawrence	18-3-1	4-1-0	t-1st	
1954-55	St. Lawrence	19-5-1	6-0-0	1st	NCAA Consolation Game (Loss)
St. Lawrence:		72-25-2	22-6-0		
Colgate Red Raiders Independent (1957–1961)
1957-58	Colgate	2-2-0			
1958-59	Colgate	2-6-0			
1959-60	Colgate	5-10-0			
1960-61	Colgate	8-15-1			
Colgate:		17-33-1			
Colgate Red Raiders (ECAC Hockey) (1961–1965)
1961-62	Colgate	18-6-0	18-6-0	t-6th	
1962-63	Colgate	16-5-1	11-4-1	7th	ECAC Quarterfinals
1963-64	Colgate	19-8-0	15-6-0	t-3rd	ECAC Quarterfinals
1964-65	Colgate	11-14-0	4-10-0	13th	
Colgate:		64-33-1	48-26-1		
Total:		153-91-4			
National champion Postseason invitational champion Conference regular season champion Conference regular season and conference tournament champion Division regular season champion Division regular season and conference tournament champion Conference tournament champion
