= Charlie Small =

American baseball player (1905–1953)

- Center fielder
- Born: October 24, 1905; Auburn, Maine, U.S.
- Died: January 14, 1953 (aged 47); Auburn, Maine, U.S.
- Batted: Left Threw: Right

MLB debut
- July 7, 1930, for the Boston Red Sox

Last MLB appearance
- September 25, 1930, for the Boston Red Sox

MLB statistics
- Batting average: .167
- Home runs: 0
- Runs scored: 1
- Stats at Baseball Reference

Teams
- Boston Red Sox (1930)

Charles Albert Small (October 24, 1905 – January 14, 1953) was an American center fielder in Major League Baseball player who played in 25 games for the Boston Red Sox during the 1930 baseball season. Born in Auburn, Maine, he was used almost exclusively as a pinch hitter, playing only one game in the field. He died in Auburn at age 47. Small was a 1927 graduate of Bates College in Maine.
