= Garland Lawing =

American baseball player (1918–1996)

- Outfielder
- Born: August 29, 1918; Gastonia, North Carolina, U.S.
- Died: September 27, 1996 (aged 78); Murrells Inlet, South Carolina, U.S.
- Batted: Right Threw: Right

MLB debut
- May 29, 1946, for the Cincinnati Reds

Last MLB appearance
- July 20, 1946, for the New York Giants

MLB statistics
- Batting average: .133
- Home runs: 0
- Runs batted in: 0
- Stats at Baseball Reference

Teams
- Cincinnati Reds (1946); New York Giants (1946)

Garland Frederick Lawing (August 29, 1918 – September 27, 1996) was an American professional baseball player. He appeared in Major League Baseball as an outfielder and pinch hitter in ten games during the 1946 season for the Cincinnati Reds and New York Giants. Lawing threw and batted right-handed; he stood 6 feet 1 inch (1.85 m) tall and weighed 180 pounds (82 kg).

Born in Gastonia, North Carolina, Lawing broke into pro baseball in 1938 in the Class D North Carolina State League. He had reached the Class A1 (now Double-A) level in 1943 when, after only 24 games played, he entered the United States Army. Lawing served in the European Theater of Operations during World War II and missed the 1944 and 1945 baseball seasons.

He split 1946 between the Reds and the Giants, going hitless in three at bats with Cincinnati as a centerfielder and pinch hitter in two games played on May 29 and June 6. Then, on June 8, his contract was sold to the Giants, and he collected his first MLB hit, a pinch single, off Johnny Vander Meer and his old teammates from the Reds on June 11. But he played in only eight total games for New York, four as a starting outfielder, and batted only .167 as a Giant. For his MLB career, he hit .133 in 15 at-bats.

Lawing then returned to minor league baseball in 1947, and retired after the 1954 season. He died in Murrells Inlet, South Carolina, at the age of 78.
