= Vern Spencer =

American baseball player

- Left fielder
- Born: February 4, 1894; Wixom, Michigan, U.S.
- Died: June 3, 1971 (aged 77); Wixom, Michigan, U.S.
- Batted: Left Threw: Right

MLB debut
- July 4, 1920, for the New York Giants

Last MLB appearance
- October 1, 1920, for the New York Giants

MLB statistics
- Batting average: .200
- Home runs: 0
- Runs batted in: 19
- Stats at Baseball Reference

Teams
- New York Giants (1920)

Vernon Murray Spencer (February 4, 1894 – June 3, 1971) was an American Major League Baseball outfielder. Spencer played for the New York Giants in the 1920 season. In 45 career games, he had 28 hits in 140 at-bats. He batted left and threw right-handed.

He was tried for murder in Sault St. Marie, Ontario, Canada in 1938 and was acquitted.

Spencer was born and died in Wixom, Michigan.
