= Saginaw Aces =

- 1919–1926; Saginaw, Michigan

Minor league affiliations
- Class: Class B (1919–1926)
- League: Michigan-Ontario League (1919–1926); Michigan State League (1926)

Major league affiliations
- Team: None

Minor league titles
- League titles (1): 1919
- Conference titles (1): 1922

Team data
- Name: Saginaw Aces (1919-1926)
- Ballpark: Aces Park (1919-1926)

The Saginaw Aces were a minor league baseball team based in Saginaw, Michigan. From 1919 to 1926, the Aces played as members of the Class B level Michigan-Ontario League for the eight-season duration of the league, winning the league championship in 1919 and capturing a league pennant in 1922.

In 1926, the Aces played in two leagues as the Michigan State League was formed through a merger of two smaller leagues during the season.

The Saginaw Aces hosted minor league home games at Aces Park in Saginaw.

== History ==
=== Early teams ===
Minor league baseball was first played in Saginaw, Michigan in 1884, when the Saginaw "Greys" team played the season as members of the Northwestern League. After numerous other teams followed, the Aces were immediately preceded in minor league play by the 1915 Saginaw Ducks team, who ended a nine-season tenure for Saginaw as members of Class C level Southern Michigan League when the league folded.

=== 1920 to 1925 Michigan-Ontario League ===
After a three-season hiatus, Saginaw again hosted minor league baseball when the 1919, Saginaw "Aces" resumed minor league play as charter members of the eight team, Class B level Michigan-Ontario League. The Battle Creek Custers, Bay City Wolves, Brantford Red Sox, Flint Halligans, Hamilton Tigers, Kitchener Beavers and London Tecumsehs and Saginaw Aces teams joined Saginaw in beginning league play on May 15, 1919. In the era, the Class B level was the equivalent of today's Class AA level league.

In their first season of Michigan-Ontario League play, the 1919 Saginaw Aces won the league championship. The Aces ended the season with a record of 77–32 and finished in first place in the eight-team league. Buzz Wetzel served as the Saginaw player/manager in their championship season, as Saginaw finished 3.0 games ahead of the second place Hamilton Tigers. No league layoffs were held. Pitcher Harry Shriver of Saginaw led the Michigan-Ontario League with an 18–6 record, while teammate Bill Pike scored 95 runs to lead the league.

In their second season of Michigan-Ontario League play, the 1920 Saginaw Aces went from a first-place championship season to last place in the league standings as their championship manager switched league teams. The Aces ended their season in eighth place in the eight-team Michigan-Ontario League, with a 43–73 record. Saginaw finished 42.0 games behind the first place London Tecumsehs, who were managed by Buzz Wentzel. Red McKee replaced Wetzel as manager of the Aces in 1920.

The Aces placed sixth in the Michigan-Ontario League overall standings 1921 as the league played a split season schedule. Saginaw ended the season with an overall record of 57–62 record, finishing 15.5 games behind the first place London Tecumsehs, managed by former Aces leader Buzz Wetzel. Saginaw did not qualify for the final playoff won by London over Bay City. Saginaw's Frank Nesser won the Michigan-Ontario League batting title, hitting .385 and led the league with 173 total hits. Aces Pitcher Claral Gillenwater had a lead leading 157 strikeouts.

Frank Nesser played for Saginaw in 1921, in his final season of professional baseball. Besides baseball, Nesser played in the early National Football League, primarily for the Columbus Panhandles (1907–1924), Akron Indians (1912, 1914) and Columbus Tigers (1925–1926), playing at 6'1" and 245 pounds. Frank was one of the Nesser Brothers, a group of seven brothers who made-up a football teammate family, playing together in different lineups from 1907 until the mid-1920s. Nesser had multiple kicking contests with the legendary football player and athlete Jim Thorpe and Nesser once was credited with a 63-yard field goal.

In his baseball career, Frank Nesser also played with the Lima Cigarmakers and Chillicothe Babes in the Ohio State League from 1910 to 1914 and with the Greensboro Patriots and Winston-Salem Twins of the North Carolina State League in 1915 and 1916. He resumed his baseball career in 1920 with the Peoria Tractors of the Illinois–Indiana–Iowa League in 1920. Playing in 1921 with Saginaw at age 32, Nesser played in 113 games with 495 plate appearances, batted .385, with an OPS of .432, 80 RBI, 30 stolen bases and 90 runs scored. He struck out 9 times against 31 walks. After the season, Frank Nesser left professional baseball after nine seasons and a career .324 batting average.

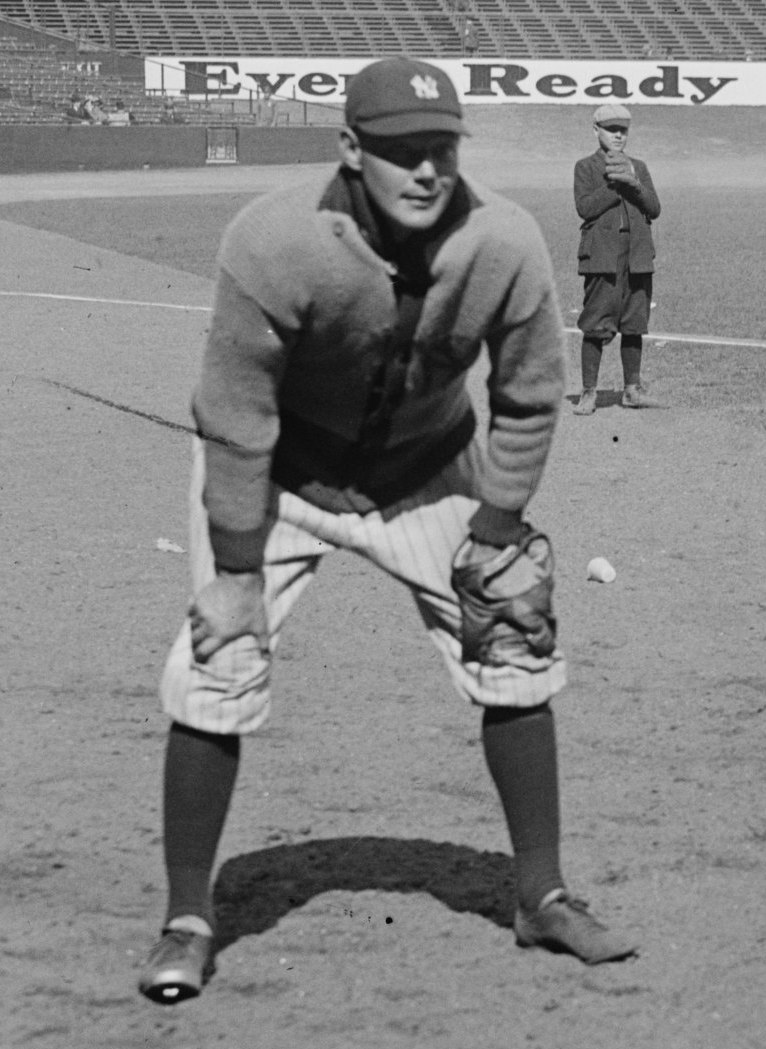
(1923) George Pipgras, New York Yankees

George Pipgras also played for the Saginaw Aces in 1921. In his first appearance for Saginaw after having pitched for the Joplin Miners, Pipgras walked 15 batters in five innings in a game against the London Tecumsehs. Piprgas improved his control and was a pitcher for the New York Yankees, breaking in as a rookie in 1923 and pitching on four World Series winning teams. Pipgras improved over time and was a starter on the 1927 New York Yankees team, which included nine future Baseball Hall of Fame members, including Babe Ruth and Lou Gehrig. Pipgras pitched a complete game in game 2 of the 1927 World Series, defeating the Pittsburgh Pirates 2–0, as the Yankees swept the Pirates in the series. After a 10–3 season in 1927, Pipgras lead the American League in wins with a 24 and had a 3.38 ERA record in 1928, when the Yankees repeated as World Series champions. In the 1928 World Series, Pipgras again had a complete game victory, He allowed 2 earned runs with 8 strikeouts in a 9-3 Yankees win over the St. Louis Cardinals in game 2. The Yankees again swept the Cardinals in the World Series. In 1932, Pigras had a 16–9 record for the World Series champion Yankees. Pipgras was the winning pitcher in game 3 of the 1932 World Series, a 7–5 win over the Chicago Cubs, pitching 8 innings at Wrigley Field.

After ending his 11-year playing career with a brief stint Boston Red Sox and he became an American League umpire, working games from 1938 to 1946. Pipgras umpired in the 1940 All-Star Game and 1944 World Series.

The 1922 Michigan-Ontario League season saw Saginaw Aces end the season in third place overall while capturing the first half title in the league's split-season schedule. The Aces finished with an overall record of 74–58, ending the season 9.5 games behind the first place Hamilton Tigers. Saginaw won the first half title and Hamilton won the second half title. Bobby Byrne and Ernest Robertson served as the Saginaw managers. In the playoff final, Hamilton defeated Saginaw for the Michigan-Ontario League championship in the final playoff 5 games to 3. Saginaw pitcher Herman Schwartje led the league with 23 wins and his Aces teammate John Roseberry had a lead leading 174 total hits.

In 1922, Paul Schrieber played for the Saginaw Aces. That season Schrieber made his major league debut in a one brief pitching appearance for the Brooklyn Robins. Schrieber then pitched in nine games for Brooklyn in 1923 and subsequently returned to the minors, where he pitched for nine seasons without another major league appearance.

On September 4, 1945, Schreiber made major league history when he pitched in a game for the New York Yankees, with the pitching appearance occurring 22 years after his prior major league appearance. Schreiber had joined the Yankees in 1938 as a coach, where his primary role was pitching batting practice. Schreiber asusequently coached for the Boston Red Sox from 1946 to 1958 before continuing to work for the Red Sox as a scout during the 1960s.

In the game on September 4, 1945, Against the Detroit Tigers, Schreiber entered the game in the seventh inning with the Yankees trailing 10–0. At age 42, as a coach, he had been activated to the Yankees' roster just days before his appearance. Schreiber received a loud ovation from the Yankees fans at Yankee Stadium upon entering the game, as his activation as a player had received media attention. After pitching three scoreless innings of the game with no hits allowed and two walks, he received another ovation after the last out in the ninth inning.

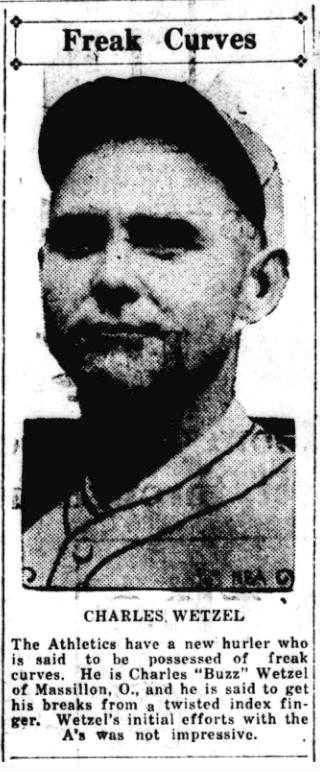
(1927) Buzz Wetzel. Wetzel managed the Saginaw Aces in 1919 and 1923, leading the 1919 Aces to the Michigan-Ontario League championship.

Buzz Wetzel returned as the Saginaw Aces manager in 1923, having managed the London Tecumsehs the three previous seasons. The Aces continued Michigan-Ontario League play and ended the season in second place in the eight-team Class B level league. The Saginaw Aces finished with a record of 78–54 and ended the season 2.5 games behind the first place Bay City Wolves as no playoffs were held. Tex Jeanes of Saginaw led the Michigan-Ontario League with both 108 RBI and 172 total hits, while teammate Al Bashang had a league leading 106 runs scored.

Al Bashang played briefly in the major leagues for the Detroit Tigers and Brooklyn Robins between 1912 and 1918. As a player, Bashang played 18 seasons of minor league baseball from 1910 to 1927, including seasons with the Saginaw Ducks (1913–1915) before returning to the Saginaw Aces for three seasons from 1923 to 1925. Prior to becoming the manager of Saginaw in 1924, Bashang had managed the Evansville Evas in 1920 and 1921. Buzz Wetzel left Saginaw to become manager of the Hamilton Clippers in 1924.

The Saginaw Aces finished in fourth place in the 1924 Michigan-Ontario League, with Al Bashang remaining with the team and becoming the Aces' player/manager. Saginaw ended the regular season with a final record of 72–64. The Aces finished 14.0 games behind the place Bay City Wolves in the eight-team league. With their fourth-place finish, Saginaw did not qualify for the playoff, where Bay City defeated the second place Flint Vehicles in seven games.

Les Nunamaker became the Aces' manager in 1925. Nunamaker had a twelve-season major league career, playing as a catcher. Nunnamaker was a member of the Boston Red Sox team that won the 1912 World Series and the Cleveland Indians team that won the 1920 World Series.

1925 was the final full season for the Michigan-Ontario League. The league reduced from eight teams to six teams for the season and played a split season schedule. With Les Nunamaker as the manager, the Saginaw Aces ended their season with a third-place finish in the six-team league. With a 74–67 record, the Aces finished 10.5 games behind the first place London Indians. Hamilton won the first half title of the split seas and London won the second half title. Saginaw did not qualify for the league playoff, won by London over Hamilton.

=== 1926: Two leagues in one season ===
In an oddity, the Saginaw Aces played in two leagues in 1926, as the Michigan-Ontario League merged with another league during the season to create a new league. The Aces began the season in the four-team Class B level Michigan-Ontario League. On June 13, 1926, the Michigan-Ontario League was folded with Saginaw in third place. The Aces had compiled a record of 19–11., when the league stopped play. In the short league season, Saginaw finished 1.0 game behind the first place Port Huron Saints (20–10) in the final standings. The Bay City, Flint and Saginaw franchises each played for the duration of the Michigan-Ontario League. With Les Nunamaker returning as manager, the Aces continued play in a newly formed league during the season.

On June 15, 1926, the eight-team, Class B level Michigan State League was reformed by the mid-season merger of two four-team leagues, the Central League and Michigan-Ontario League. The Bay City Wolves, Flint Vehicles, Port Huron Saints and the Saginaw Aces teams of the Michigan-Ontario League merged with the Grand Rapids Black Sox, Kalamazoo Celery Pickers, Ludington Tars and Muskegon Reds teams of the Central League to form the new Michigan State League. The league began play immediately with a new schedule created.

Playing in the newly formed league, Saginaw Aces placed third in the 1926 Michigan State League final standings. No league playoffs were held as Saginaw finished their league schedule with a 55–41 record. Les Nunamaker continued as the Aces manager as the first place Bay City Wolves ended the season 10.0 games ahead of the Saginaw. Pitcher Sid Dyer of the Aces led the Michigan State League with 148 strikeouts.

Red Strader played for the 1926 Aces in his first season of professional baseball at age 23. A multisport athlete, Strader had graduated from and played for the Saint Mary's Gaels football team in college. After playing the season for the Aces in baseball, Strader played his first season of professional football in the fall of 1926 with the Chicago Bulls of the first American Football League. In 1927 he played with the Hollywood Stars and Cedar Rapids Bunnies in the professional baseball season and the National Football League's Chicago Cardinals in the football season. In 1928 Strader began coaching football in college and later served in the military during World War II, where he coached the 1944 Camp Peary Pirates football team, a military service team. He eventually became a long time NFL assistant coach before serving as the head coach of the New York Yanks from 1950 to 1954 and the San Francisco 49ers in 1955. In May 1956, Strader died of a heart attack at age 53.

The Michigan State League folded after their partial 1926 season and did not return to play in 1927. The Michigan State League did reform in 1940, with Saginaw resuming minor league play, when the "Saginaw Athletics" were formed. Saginaw won the 1940 Michigan State League championship.

== The ballpark ==
The Saginaw Aces and other Saginaw teams played minor league home games at "Aces Park" from 1902 to 1926. in its tenure, the ballpark was also known as: Athletic Park (1902–1906), Recreation Park (1908), Burkhart Park (1909–1915) and Opportunity Park (1919). In the era, Aces Park was located at Davenport Avenue and Mary Street in Saginaw, Michigan. The park had some misfortune. It was destroyed by fire in 1908 and rebuilt. The ballpark flooded in 1912 and was destroyed by fire again in 1913, to be rebuilt again. Today, the site is a salvage yard.

== Timeline ==
Year(s)	# Yrs.	Team	Level	League	Ballpark
1919–1926	8	Saginaw Aces	Class B	Michigan-Ontario League	Aces Park
1926	1	Saginaw Aces	Class B	Michigan State League	Aces Park

== Year–by–year records ==
Year	Record	Finish	Manager	Playoffs/notes
1919	77-32	1st	Buzz Wetzel	No playoffs held Won league championship
1920	43-73	8th	Red McKee	No playoffs held
1921	57-62	6th	Red McKee / Guy Zinn	Did not qualify
1922	74-58	3rd	Bobby Byrne / Ernest Robertson	Won first-half pennant Lost in final
1923	78-54	2nd	Buzz Wetzel	No playoffs held
1924	72-64	4th	Al Bashang	Did not quality
1925	76-66	3rd	Les Nunamaker	Did not qualify
1926 (1)	19–10	2nd	Les Nunamaker	League merged on June 15
1926 (2)	55-41	3rd	Les Nunamaker	No playoffs held

== Notable alumni ==
- Al Bashang (1923; 1924, MGR)
- Bobby Byrne (1922, MGR)
- Sam Dodge (1920)
- Allen Elliott (1922)
- Spoke Emery (1919)
- Frank Fletcher (1919)
- Trader Horne (1923–1924)
- Frank Gleich (1919)
- Hal Goldsmith (1922)
- Art Jacobs (1925)
- Tex Jeanes (1927)
- Mel Kerr (1925)
- LaRue Kirby (1921–1922)
- Red McKee (1920–1921, MGR)
- Bud Messenger (1923–1924)
- Otis L. Miller (1922)
- Ernie Neitzke (1923)
- Frank Nesser (1927)
- Les Nunamaker (1925–1926, MGR)
- George Orme (1919, 1924)
- George Pipgras (1921)
- Paul Schreiber (1922)
- Harry Shriver (1919–1921)
- Red Strader (1926)
- Dutch Ussat (1924–1925)
- Frank Wayenberg (1922–1923)
- Buzz Wetzel (1919, 1923, MGR)
- Clarence Winters (1923)
- Jack Wisner (1919)
- Elmer Yoter (1924)
- Guy Zinn (1921, MGR)

== See also ==
- Saginaw Aces players
- Saginaw, Michigan minor league baseball history
