= Michigan–Ontario League =

Professional baseball league

- Classification: Class B (1919–1926)
- Sport: Minor League Baseball
- First season: 1919
- Folded: June 13, 1926
- Replaced by: Michigan State League
- President: Joseph S. Jackson (1919); George H. Maines (1920–1921); Thomas J. Halligan (1922–1926)
- No. of teams: 13
- Country: United States of America, Canada
- Most titles: 2 London Tecumsehs; Bay City Wolves
- Related competitions: Central League

Michigan–Ontario League was the name of an American professional baseball league. It operated seven full seasons and part of an eighth from 1919 to 1926.

In 1926, the Michigan–Ontario League merged with the Central League to form the Michigan State League, which played only the one season.

== Cities represented ==
- Battle Creek, MI: Battle Creek Custers 1919–1920
- Bay City, MI: Bay City Wolves 1919–1926
- Brantford, ON: Brantford Red Sox 1919–1921; Brantford Brants 1922
- Flint, MI: Flint Halligans 1919–1920; Flint Vehicles 1921–1926
- Grand Rapids, MI: Grand Rapids Billbobs 1923; Grand Rapids Homoners 1924
- Hamilton, ON: Hamilton Tigers 1919–1923; Hamilton Clippers 1924–1925
- Kalamazoo, MI: Kalamazoo Celery Pickers 1923; Kalamazoo Kazoos 1924
- Kitchener, ON: Kitchener Beavers 1919–1921; Kitchener Terriers 1922; Kitchener Colts 1925
- London, ON: London Tecumsehs 1919–1924; London Indians 1925
- Muskegon, MI: Muskegon Anglers 1923–1924
- Port Huron, MI: Port Huron Saints 1921; Port Huron Saints 1926
- Port Huron, MI & Sarnia, ON: Port Huron-Sarnia Saints 1922
- Saginaw, MI: Saginaw Aces 1919–1926

== Standings & statistics ==
1919 Michigan–Ontario League

Team standings	W	L	PCT	GB	Managers
Saginaw Aces	77	32	.706	–	Buzz Wetzel
Hamilton Tigers	75	36	.676	3	Frank Shaughnessy
Battle Creek Custers	67	45	.598	11½	Dan Jenkins
Brantford Red Sox	61	46	.570	15	Knotty Lee
Bay City Wolves	43	69	.384	35½	Bill Cristall / Cal Wenger
Kitchener Beavers	41	68	.376	36	Jack Beatty
London Tecumsehs	41	70	.369	37	Joe Keenan / Starr Mason / Ken Hagel / Dad Stewart
Flint Halligans	35	74	.321	42	Jim Pierce

No playoffs held

Player statistics
Player	Team	Stat	Tot	Player	Team	Stat	Tot
Ted Kaylor	Battle Creek	BA	.376	John Glasier	Hamilton	W	25
Bill Pike	Saginaw	Runs	95	John Glasier	Hamilton	SO	213
Ted Kaylor	Battle Creek	Hits	146	Len Okrie	London	ERA	1.00
Andy Lotshaw	Flint/Brantford	HR	13	Harry Shriver	Saginaw	PCT	.750 18–6

1920 Michigan–Ontario League

Team standings	W	L	PCT	GB	Managers
London Tecumsehs	86	32	.729	-	Buzz Wetzel
Hamilton Tigers	71	46	.607	14½	Frank Shaughnessy
Brantford Red Sox	65	48	.575	18½	Knotty Lee
Kitchener Beavers	53	63	.457	32	Jack Beatty
Flint Halligans	53	63	.457	32	James Pierce / Ted Anderson
Bay City Wolves	51	69	.425	36	Cal Wenger
Battle Creek Custers	46	74	.383	41	Gene Krapp / Johnnie Heving / James Pierce
Saginaw Aces	43	73	.371	42	Red McKee

No playoffs held.

Player statistics
Player	Team	Stat	Tot	Player	Team	Stat	Tot
Henry Wetzel	Flint	BA	.387	George Carmen	London	W	26
E. H. Kennedy	London	Runs	100	Bill Morrisette	Hamilton	SO	181
Henry Wetzel	Flint	Hits	164	Joseph Reddy	Hamilton	ERA	1.24
Henry Wetzel	Flint	RBI	72	Tom Estelle	Brantford	ERA	1.24
Henry Wetzel	Flint	HR	12	George Carmen	London	Pct	.929; 26–2

1921 Michigan–Ontario League

Team standings	W	L	PCT	GB	Managers
London Tecumsehs	72	46	.610	–	Buzz Wetzel
Brantford Red Sox	64	52	.552	7	George Orme
Bay City Wolves	65	53	.551	7	Punch Knoll
Hamilton Tigers	64	55	.538	8½	Patsy O'Rourke
Port Huron-Sarnia Saints	58	63	.479	15½	James Pierce / Ed Harter
Saginaw Aces	57	62	.479	15½	Red McKee / Guy Zinn
Kitchener Beavers	45	68	.398	24½	Dutch Jordan / Ernie Calbert
Flint Vehicles	48	74	.393	26	Ted Anderson / Dolly Gray

Playoff: London 4 games, Bay City 2.

Player statistics
Player	Team	Stat	Tot	Player	Team	Stat	Tot
Frank Nesser	Saginaw	BA	.385	Cy Boothby	Bay City	W	21
William Gray	Flint	Runs	104	Claral Gillenwater	Saginaw	SO	157
Frank Nesser	Saginaw	Hits	173	Petie Behan	Hamilton	ERA	1.33
Frank Emmer	Flint	HR	15	Frank Matusak	Bay City	PCT	.762 16–5
Ted Kaylor	Port Huron-Sarnia	RBI	92				

1922 Michigan–Ontario League

Team standings	W	L	PCT	GB	Managers
Hamilton Tigers	84	49	.632	–	Ernie Calbert
London Tecumsehs	83	50	.624	1	Buzz Wetzel
Saginaw Aces	74	58	.561	9½	Bobby Byrne / Ernest Robertson
Bay City Wolves	69	62	.527	14	Punch Knoll
Port Huron-Sarnia Saints	67	65	.508	16½	Bill Kelly
Brantford Brants	54	77	.412	29	Mickey LaLonge
Flint Vehicles	53	81	.396	31½	William Powell / George Orme
Kitchener Terriers	46	88	.343	38½ 5	Tex Erwin / Jack Ryan / Ray Dunn / James Pierce

Playoff: Hamilton 5 games, Saginaw 3.

Player statistics
Player	Team	Stat	Tot	Player	Team	Stat	Tot
Jack Shafer	London	BA	.410	Herman Schwartje	Saginaw	W	23
Clifford Hegedorn	Bay City	Runs	105	John Saladna	Brantford	SO	164
Ernie Calbert	Hamilton	Hits	174	Richard Glazier	Port Huron-Sarnia	ERA	1.31
John Roseberry	Saginaw	Hits	174	Petie Behan	Hamilton	PCT	.840 21–4
Ernie Calbert	Hamilton	RBI	110				
Ernie Calbert	Hamilton	HR	28				

1923 Michigan–Ontario League

Team standings	W	L	PCT	GB	Managers
Bay City Wolves	80	51	.611	–	Punch Knoll
Saginaw Aces	78	54	.591	2½	Buzz Wetzel
Muskegon Anglers	73	57	.562	6½	Red Fisher
Flint Vehicles	70	63	.526	11	Dan O'Leary
Kalamazoo Celery Pickers	69	64	.518	12	Marty Becker
London Tecumsehs	55	73	.430	23½	Leo Mackey / Jack Beatty
Grand Rapids Billbobs	55	76	.420	25	Bob Wells
Hamilton Tigers	45	87	.341	35½	Johnny Carlin

No playoffs held.

Player statistics
Player	Team	Stat	Tot	Player	Team	Stat	Tot
Frank Luce	Flint	BA	.382	Seraphin Good	Bay City	W	20
Al Bashang	Saginaw	Runs	106	Seraphin Good	Bay City	SO	168
Art Jahn	Flint	Hits	172	Ovila Lahaie	Bay City	ERA	1.85
Tex Jeanes	Saginaw	Hits	172	Seraphin Good	Bay City	PCT	.800 20–5
Tex Jeanes	Saginaw	RBI	108				
Art Jahn	Flint	HR	18				

1924 Michigan–Ontario League

Team standings	W	L	PCT	GB	Managers
Bay City Wolves	86	50	.632	–	Punch Knoll
Flint Vehicles	78	52	.600	5	Dan O'Leary
Hamilton Clippers	76	60	.559	10	Buzz Wetzel
Saginaw Aces	72	64	.529	14	Al Bashang
London Tecumsehs	62	70	.470	22	Jack Beatty
Grand Rapids Homoners	60	74	.448	25	Josh Devore
Muskegon Anglers	58	79	.423	28½	Red Fisher / Jack Ryan
Kalamazoo Kazoos	45	88	.338	39½	Marty Becker / Newt Hunter

Playoff: Bay City 4 games, Flint 3.

Player statistics
Player	Team	Stat	Tot	Player	Team	Stat	Tot
Leo Payne	Grand Rapids	BA	.397	Joe Kiefer	Bay City	W	19
Frank McGee	Hamilton	Runs	111	Ovila Lahaie	Bay City	SO	148
George Tomer	Bay City	Hits	174	Elton Rynearson	Muskegon	ERA	2.51
Frank Gleich	Hamilton	RBI	95	Sylvester Heitzman	Bay City	PCT	.783 18–5
Frank Luce	Flint	HR	23				

1925 Michigan–Ontario League

Team standings	W	L	PCT	GB	Managers
London Indians	83	52	.615	–	Mike Baker
Hamilton Clippers	82	57	.590	3	Buzz Wetzel
Saginaw Aces	76	66	.535	10½	Les Nunamaker
Bay City Wolves	74	67	.525	12	Dick Breen
Flint Vehicles	68	73	.482	18	Jack Hruska
Kitchener Colts	35	103	.254	49½	Knotty Lee / George Orme

Playoff: Hamilton 4 games, London 3.

Player statistics
Player	Team	Stat	Tot	Player	Team	Stat	Tot
Joe Klein	London	BA	.363	Will Coogan	London	W	24
Guy Froman	Hamilton	Runs	107	Marty Griffin	Bay City	SO	137
Walter Sandquist	London	Hits	178	Will Coogan	London	ERA	2.48
Guy Froman	Hamilton	RBI	112	Pete Harris	London	PCT	.688 22–10
Guy Froman	Hamilton	HR	18				

1926 Michigan–Ontario League

Team standings	W	L	PCT	GB	Managers
Port Huron Saints	20	10	.667	-	Johnny Carlin
Saginaw Aces	19	11	.633	1	Les Nunamaker
Bay City Wolves	10	18	.357	9	Bob Prysock
Flint Vehicles	9	19	.321	10	Ray Dunn

Last game played June 13. The league merged with the Central League to form the Michigan State League, which began play June 15.
