= Bay City Wolves =

- 1919–1926; Bay City, Michigan

Minor league affiliations
- Class: Class B (1919–1926)
- League: Michigan-Ontario League (1919–1926); Michigan State League (1926)

Major league affiliations
- Team: None

Minor league titles
- League titles (3): 1923; 1924; 1926
- Conference titles (2): 1921; 1924

Team data
- Name: Bay City Wolves (1919-1926)
- Ballpark: Clarkston Park (1919-1926)

The Bay City Wolves were a minor league baseball team based in Bay City, Michigan. From 1919 to 1926, the Wolves played as members of the Class B level Michigan-Ontario League for the eight-season duration of the league, winning league consecutive championships in 1923 and 1924.

In 1926, the Michigan State League was formed through a merger of two leagues during the season, with the Wolves capturing the Michigan State League championship in their final season. The Bay City Wolves hosted minor league home games at Clarkston Park.

Baseball Hall of Fame member Kiki Cuyler played his first professional seasons for the 1920 and 1921 Bay City Wolves. His contract was purchased from Bay City by the Pittsburgh Pirates in 1921.

== History ==
=== Early Bay cCity teams ===
Minor league baseball began in Bay City in 1883, when the "Bay City" team played the season as a member of the Northwestern League. After numerous teams followed, the Wolves were immediately preceded in minor league play by the 1915 Bay City Beavers, who ended a nine-season tenure as members of the Class C level Southern Michigan League.

=== 1919 to 1925: Michigan-Ontario League ===
In 1919, the "Bay City Wolves" resumed minor league play as charter members of the Class B level Michigan-Ontario League. The Battle Creek Custers, Brantford Red Sox, Flint Halligans, Hamilton Tigers, Kitchener Beavers, London Tecumsehs and Saginaw Aces teams joined Bay City in beginning league play on May 15, 1919.

In their first season of Michigan-Ontario League play, the 1919 Bay City Wolves ended the season with a record of 43–69. The Wolves finished in fifth place, 36.0 games behind the first place Saginaw Aces. Bill Cristall and Cal Wenger served as the Bay City managers.

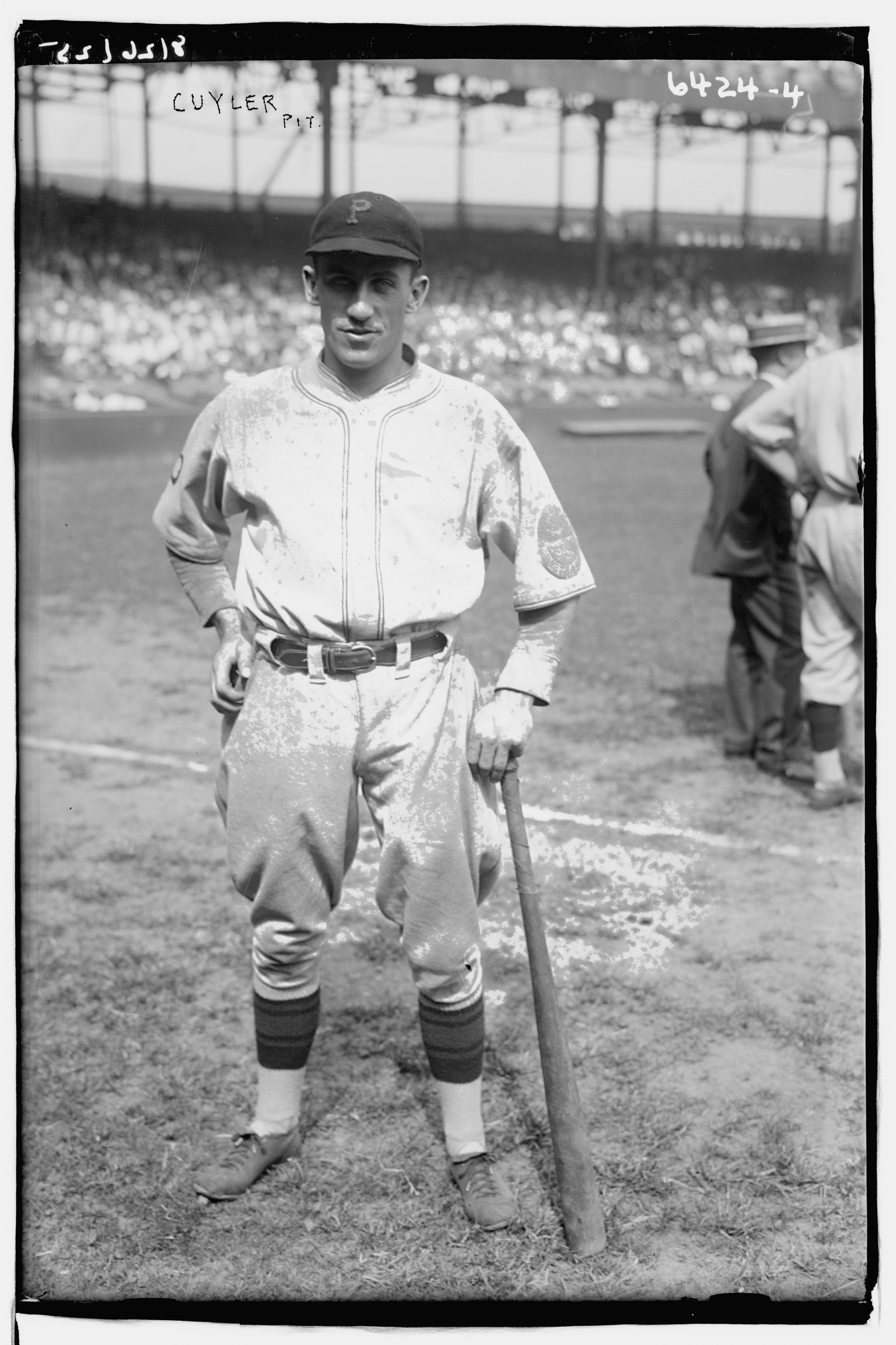
(1925) Baseball Hall of Fame member Kiki Cuyler, Pittsburgh Pirates. Cuyler played for Bay City in his first two professional seasons.

In their second season of Michigan-Ontario League play, the 1920 Bay City Wolves ended the season in sixth place in the eight-team league. With a 51–69 record, Bay City ended the season 36.0 games behind the first place London Tecumsehs as Cal Wenger returned as manager. At age 20, Baseball Hall of Fame member Kiki Cuyler played for Bay City in 1920, hitting .258 in his first professional season.

The Wolves placed third in the Michigan-Ontario League overall standings 1921 and won the first-half title in a split season schedule. Bay City ended the season with an overall record of 65–53 record, finishing 7.0 games behind London. Punch Knoll began a successful four season tenure as the Bay City manager. In the playoff London defeated Bay City 4 games to 2. Pitcher Cy Boothby of Bay City led the Michigan-Ontario League with 21 wins. Kiki Cuyler continued play with Bay City in 1921. Cuyler hit .317 in 116 games before making his major league debut with the Pittsburgh Pirates during the 1921 season. In September, Pittsburgh purchased his contract from Bay City for $2,500. Cuyler was also pursued by the Detroit Tigers and their manager Ty Cobb.

The 1922 Michigan-Ontario League season saw Bay City end the season fourth place. The Wolves finished with an overall record of 69–62, ending 14.0 games behind the first place Hamilton Tigers. Punch Knoll returned as Bay City manager. Hamilton defeated Saginaw for the championship in the league playoff. Saraphin Good, a Bay City pitcher led the league with 19 wins and a 19–4 record.

In 1923, the Wolves won their first of consecutive Michigan-Ontario League championships. The Bay City Wolves finished in first place with a record of 80–51, playing under the returning manager Punch Knoll. Bay City ended the season 2½ games ahead of the second place Saginaw Aces as no playoffs were held. Seraphin Good of Bay City led the league with both 20 wins (20-5) and 168 strikeouts, while teammate Ovila Lahaie had a league leading ERA of 1.85.

Bay City defended their Michigan-Ontario League championship in 1924. The Bay City Wolves ended the regular season with a record of 86–50, in the final season under manager Punch Knoll. The Wolves finished 5.0 games ahead of the second place Flint Vehicles in the eight-team league. In the playoff, Bay City defeated Flint in seven games. Joe Kiefer of Bay City led the Michigan-Ontario League with 19 wins, Ovila Lahaie had a league leading 148 strikeouts, Sylvester Heitzman of Bay City had a league best .783 winning percentage with an 18–5 records and George Tomer of Bay City led the league with 174 total hits.

1925 was the final full season for the Michigan-Ontario League, as the league reduced to six teams. The Bay City Wolves ended their final season in fourth place. With a 74–67 record, the Wolves finished 12.0 games behind the first place London Indians, who won the league playoff over Hamilton. Dick Breen served as the Bay City manager. Pitcher Marty Griffin of Bay City led the league with 137 strikeouts.

=== 1926: Two leagues / final season ===
Bay City played in two leagues in 1926 winning a league championship, as the Michigan-Ontario League merged during the season to create a new league. The Wolves began the season in the four-team Michigan-Ontario League. On June 13, 1926, the league folded with Bay City in third place, with a record of 10–18 to finish 9.0 games behind the first place Port Huron Saints. Bob Prysock was the manager as the team continued play in a new league.

On June 15, 1926, the Michigan State League was reformed by the mid-season merger of the Central League and Michigan-Ontario League. Bay City, the Flint Vehicles, Port Huron and the Saginaw Aces teams of the Michigan-Ontario League merged with the Grand Rapids Black Sox, Kalamazoo Celery Pickers, Ludington Tars and Muskegon Reds of the Central League to form the new Michigan State League.

The Wolves captured the Michigan State League championship in the newly formed league. The Bay City Wolves finished in first place with a 64–30 record. Bob Prysock continued as the manager as the Wolves ended the season 8.0 games ahead of the second place Port Huron Saints. Al Bashang of Bay City led the Michigan State League in scoring 107 runs. Saraphin Good of Bay City led the league with 19 wins and a 19–4 record.

The Michigan State League did not return to play in 1927. The league next formed in 1941 without a Bay City franchise. Bay City has not hosted another minor league team.

== The ballpark ==
The Bay City Wolves hosted minor league home games at Clarkson Park. The ballpark was named for Baseball Hall of Fame member John Clarkson, who had played for an early Bay City team. The ballpark began hosting minor league baseball in 1906, when the Bay City team in the Interstate Association played home games at the ballpark. Clarkston Park was located at the corner of Livingston Street & Center Avenue in Bay City. Today, the site contains retail properties.

== Timeline ==
Year(s)	# Yrs.	Team	Level	League	Ballpark
1919–1926	8	Bay City Wolves	Class B	Michigan-Ontario League	Clarkson Park
1926	1	Bay City Wolves	Class B	Michigan State League	Clarkson Park

== Year–by–year records ==
Year	Record	Finish	Manager	Playoffs/notes
1919	43-69	5th	Bill Cristall / Cal Wenger	No playoffs held
1920	51-69	6th	Cal Wenger	No playoffs held
1921	65-53	3rd	Punch Knoll	Won first half title Lost in league final
1922	69-62	4th	Punch Knoll	Did not qualify
1923	80-51	1st	Punch Knoll	No playoffs held League champions
1924	86-50	1st	Punch Knoll	Won league pennant League champions
1925	74-67	4th	Dick Breen	Did not qualify
1926 (1)	10–18	3rd	Bob Prysock	League merged on June 15
1926 (2)	64-30	1st	Bob Prysock	No playoffs held League champions

== Notable alumni ==
- Kiki Cuyler (1921-1922) Inducted Baseball Hall of Fame, 1968
- Al Bashang (1926)
- Jim Brown (1925)
- Bud Connolly (1923-1924)
- Bill Cristall (1919, MGR)
- Claral Gillenwater (1926)
- Marty Griffin (1925)
- Hal Haid (1919)
- Spencer Harris (1922-1924)
- Arthur Hauger (1924)
- Bill Kelly (1921)
- Joe Kiefer (1924)
- Punch Knoll (1921-1924, MGR)
- Fritz Knothe (1925)
- Ben Koehler (1921-1922)
- Willie Ludolph (1923)
- Bill Mizeur (1923)
- Syl Simon (1922)
- George Tomer (1923-1925)
- Bill Whaley (1919-1922)

== See also ==
- Bay City Wolves players
