= Saginaw, Michigan minor league baseball history =

Saginaw, Michigan minor league baseball teams
- 1884–1951; (1884, 1889, 1893, 1896–1898, 1900, 1906, 1908–1915, 1919–1926, 1940–1941, 1948–1951); Saginaw, Michigan

Minor league affiliations
- Class: Class C (1896); Class D (1897, 1906–1910); Class C (1911–1912); Class D (1913); Class C (1914–1915); Class B (1919–1926); Class C (1940–1941); Class A (1948–1951)
- League: Northwestern League (1884); Michigan State League (1889); Ohio-Michigan League (1893); Interstate League (1896); Michigan State League (1897); International League (1898, 1900); Interstate Association (1906); Southern Michigan League (1906, 1908–1915); Michigan-Ontario League (1919–1926); Michigan State League (1926, 1940–1941); Central League (1948–1951)

Major league affiliations
- Team: Chicago White Sox (1941)

Minor league titles
- League titles (5): 1889; 1908; 1909; 1914; 1919

Team data
- Name: Saginaw Greys (1884); Saginaw (1889); Saginaw Alerts (1893); Saginaw Lumbermen (1896–1897); Saginaw Braves (1898); Saginaw Salt Eaters (1900); Saginaw (1906); Saginaw Wa-was (1908–1910); Saginaw Krazy Kats (1911); Saginaw Trailers (1912); Saginaw Ducks (1913–1915); Saginaw Aces (1919–1926); Saginaw Athletics (1940); Saginaw White Sox (1941); Saginaw Bears (1948–1950); Saginaw Jacks (1951)
- Ballpark: Aces Park (1902–1926); Saginaw Stadium (1940–1951)

Minor league baseball teams played in Saginaw, Michigan in various seasons between 1884 and 1951. Saginaw teams played as members of the Northwestern League (1884), Michigan State League (1889), Ohio-Michigan League (1893), Michigan State League (1897), International League (1898, 1900), Interstate Association (1906), Southern Michigan League (1906, 1908–1915), Michigan-Ontario League (1919–1926), Michigan State League (1926, 1940–1941) and Central League (1948–1951).

Saginaw was a minor league affiliate of the Chicago White Sox in 1941.

Baseball Hall of Fame members John Clarkson (1884) and Jesse Haines (1914–1915) played for Saginaw.

== History ==
Saginaw teams were members of the Central League (1948–1951), Michigan State League (1889, 1897, 1926, 1940–1941) Michigan-Ontario League (1919–1926) Southern Michigan League (1906, 1908–1915) Interstate Association (1906) International League (1898, 1900) Ohio-Michigan League (1893) and Northwestern League (1884).

Minor league baseball in Saginaw started in 1884, with the Saginaw Greys. The team had a variety of monikers: Jacks (1951), Bears (1948–1950), White Sox (1941), Athletics (1940), Aces (1919–1926), Ducks (1913–1916), Trailers (1912), Krazy Kats (1911), Wa-was (1908–1910), Salt Eaters (1900), Braves (1898), Lumberman (1896–1897), and Alerts (1893).

The 1889 Saginaw team finished in second place in the Michigan State League with an overall record of 59–40. The Jackson Jaxons and Saginaw finished had in a virtual tie for first place before Jackson played their make-up games to gain enough victories to win the championship. Saginaw protested the validity of the make-up games, Michigan State League president Curtis granted the protest and awarded the championship to Saginaw.

The Saginaw Alerts were disbanded on June 11, 1893.

The 1902 Saginaw White Sox were a Michigan State League team that was relocated to Jackson, Michigan on July 20, 1902.

The 1908 and 1909 Saginaw Wa-was won consecutive league titles in the Southern Michigan League.

In 1912, the Saginaw Trailers were disbanded with a 19–44 record on July 13, as their ballpark was flooded.

In 1914, the Saginaw Ducks won the Southern Michigan League championship with a 90–55 record. In 1915 the league disbanded mid–season with the Ducks having a 31–38 record.

The Saginaw Aces won the 1919 Michigan-Ontario League Championship, finishing with a record of 77–32. The 1922 Saginaw Aces finished 74–58 and lost in the Finals.

The 1940 Saginaw Athletics finished second in the Michigan State at 53–48. The Athletics made the Finals, which were cancelled by weather.

The final Saginaw minor league team, the Saginaw Jacks finished third in the 1951 Central League with a 79–58 record. The Central League folded after the 1951 season. Saginaw has not hosted another minor league team.

== The ballparks ==
Saginaw teams played home games at Aces Park from 1902 to 1926. It was also known as: Athletic Park (1902–1906), Recreation Park (1908), Burkhart Park (1909–1915) and Opportunity Park (1919). Aces Park was located at Davenport Avenue and Mary Street in Saginaw, Michigan. The park had some misfortune. It was destroyed by fire in 1908 and rebuilt. The ballpark flooded in 1912 and was destroyed by fire again in 1913, to be rebuilt again. Today, the site is a salvage yard.

The Saginaw teams from 1940 to 1951 played minor league home games at Veterans Memorial Stadium. The ballpark was located at Holland & 20th Street. In 1948 it was renamed Saginaw Stadium. Today, the site is still in use as a public park and has been renamed to McKinely Park. McKinely Park is located at 930 South 20th Street in Saginaw, Michigan.

== Notable alumni ==
- John Clarkson (1884) Inducted Baseball Hall of Fame, 1963
- Jesse Haines (1914–1915) Inducted Baseball Hall of Fame, 1970
- Ed Albosta (1951)
- Tug Arundel (1884)
- Frank Beck (1884)
- Bob Buhl (1948) 2x MLB All-Star
- Donie Bush (1906)
- John Clarkson (1884)
- Jack Corcoran (1893)
- Babe Doty (1898)
- Jay Faatz (1884)
- Tom Forster (1884)
- Frank Gilhooley (1910)
- Preston Gomez (1949)
- Charlie Hemphill (1896)
- Ducky Holmes (1913–1915)
- Charlie Jones (1898)
- Malachi Kittridge (1911)
- Red Kleinow (1900)
- Johnny Lavin (1884)
- John Mansell (1884)
- Mike Morrison (1893)
- Greasy Neale (1915)
- Les Nunamaker (1919, 1925–1926)
- Dick Phillips (1951)
- Bill Reidy (1893)
- George Rooks (1893)
- Frank Smith (1884)
- Harry Smith) (1884)
- Harry Spence (1884)
- Jim Tray (1884)
- Fred Underwood (1898)
- Art Whitney (1884)

== See also ==
- Saginaw (minor league baseball) players
- Saginaw Aces players
- Saginaw Alerts players
- Saginaw Bears players
- Saginaw Braves players
- Saginaw Ducks players
- Saginaw Greys players
- Saginaw Jacks players
