= Paul Schreiber =

American baseball player (1902-1982)

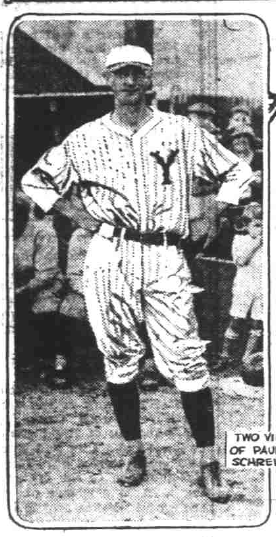
- Pitcher
- Born: October 8, 1902; Jacksonville, Florida, U.S.
- Died: January 28, 1982 (aged 79); Sarasota, Florida, U.S.
- Batted: Right Threw: Right

MLB debut
- September 2, 1922, for the Brooklyn Robins

Last MLB appearance
- September 8, 1945, for the New York Yankees

MLB statistics
- Win–loss record: 0–0
- Earned run average: 3.98
- Strikeouts: 5
- Stats at Baseball Reference

Teams
- Brooklyn Robins (1922–1923); New York Yankees (1945)

Paul Frederick Schreiber (October 8, 1902 – January 28, 1982) was an American pitcher in Major League Baseball. He pitched in ten games for the Brooklyn Robins during the 1922 and 1923 baseball seasons. He returned to the major leagues as a batting practice pitcher and coach for the New York Yankees in 1938. In 1945, while he was coaching for the Yankees, he briefly came out of retirement to pitch in two more games when the staff was depleted due to World War II. His span of 22 years and 2 days between consecutive major league appearances remains an MLB record.

Schreiber then was a coach for the Boston Red Sox for 13 seasons, from 1946 to 1958, and scouted for them during the 1960s.

== Early life and career ==
Schreiber graduated from Duval High School in Jacksonville, Florida in 1918. For two years he played amateur baseball in Jacksonville before signing with the Brooklyn Robins organization in 1919. From 1920 to 1921, Schreiber played for minor league team Lakeland in the Florida State League. In 1922, he played for the Saginaw Aces of the Michigan–Ontario League. Schreiber joined the major league Brooklyn Robins in 1923, although he had appeared in one game for them the year prior. Schreiber pitched in ten games of the 1923 season, however his major league career was shortened in mid-1924 by an arm injury. Schreiber pitched for the Scranton Miners baseball team of the New York–Pennsylvania League in 1926. He went 14–9 with a 2.74 ERA in 68 games played.

Schreiber made a return to baseball in 1930 joining the Allentown Dukes of the Eastern League. He played with Easton in 1932 until the league was dissolved July 17. Afterwards, Schreiber tried semi-pro baseball and was a pitcher on the Brooklyn Bushwicks in 1937.
