= Clarence Winters =

American baseball player (1899–1945)

- Pitcher
- Born: September 7, 1899; Detroit, Michigan
- Died: June 29, 1945 (aged 45); Detroit, Michigan
- Batted: Unknown Threw: Right

MLB debut
- August 28, 1924, for the Boston Red Sox

Last MLB appearance
- September 1, 1924, for the Boston Red Sox

MLB statistics
- Win–loss record: 0-1
- Strikeouts: 3
- Earned run average: 20.57
- Stats at Baseball Reference

Teams
- Boston Red Sox (1924)

Clarence John Winters (September 7, 1899 – June 29, 1945) was a professional baseball pitcher. He appeared in four games in Major League Baseball for the Boston Red Sox during the 1924 season. He was born in Detroit, Michigan.

Winters began his professional career in 1920 with the Battle Creek Custers of the Michigan–Ontario League. He was 24 years old when he entered the majors with Boston. He had been obtained from Class-A San Antonio in exchange for Oscar Fuhr.

In one season career, Winters posted a 0–1 record with a 20.57 ERA in four appearances, including two starts, one game finished, three strikeouts, four walks, 22 hits allowed, in 7 innings pitched.

Winters died at the age of 45 in his hometown of Detroit, Michigan.
