= Red McKee =

American baseball player (1890–1972)

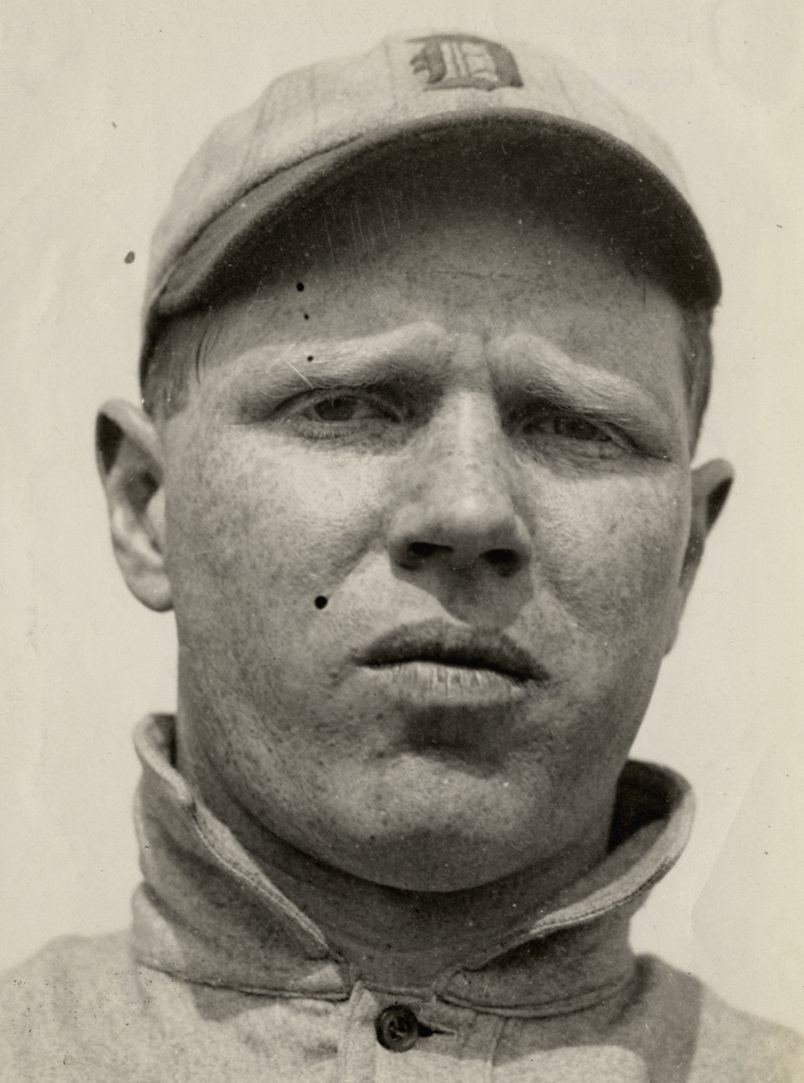
- Catcher
- Born: July 20, 1890; Shawnee, Ohio, U.S.
- Died: August 5, 1972 (aged 82); Saginaw, Michigan, U.S.
- Batted: Left Threw: Right

MLB debut
- April 19, 1913, for the Detroit Tigers

Last MLB appearance
- September 19, 1916, for the Detroit Tigers

MLB statistics
- Batting average: .254
- Games: 189
- Assists: 165
- Stats at Baseball Reference

Teams
- Detroit Tigers (1913–1916)

Raymond Ellis "Red" McKee (July 20, 1890 – August 5, 1972) was an American baseball catcher. He played professional baseball for 21 years from 1908 to 1928, including four seasons in Major League Baseball with the Detroit Tigers from 1913 to 1916. He appeared in 189 major league games and compiled a .254 batting average.

== Early years ==
McKee was born in Shawnee, Perry County, Ohio, in 1890.

== Professional baseball ==
McKee was drafted by the New York Highlanders from Indianapolis of the American Association. Two days later, the Highlanders traded McKee to the Tigers for Claud Derrick. From 1913 to 1916, McKee played in 189 games for the Detroit Tigers, 150 as a catcher and the rest as a pinch hitter. He had a career batting average of .254 and an on-base percentage of .339. In 1913, McKee had 237 putouts, 84 assists, and 5 double plays in only 62 games as a catcher.

He signed his first professional baseball contract in early 1908 with Saginaw of the Southern Michigan League. He was a coal miner at the time he signed with Saginaw. Before the season started, he left Saginaw and played as a catcher for Grayling. He then moved on to Cheboygan where he also worked in a paper mill. After a month in Cheboygan, he played for a club in Sault Ste. Marie, Ontario. He also played during the 1908 season for clubs in Sault Ste. Marie, Michigan, and Negaunee, Michigan. He later played in the minor leagues for the Indianapolis Indians (1910-1912), Springfield Reapers (1911-1912), San Francisco Seals (1917-1919), Saginaw Aces (1920-1921), San Antonio Bears (1922), Syracuse Stars (1923-1925), Baltimore Orioles (1925-1926), and Memphis Chickasaws (1927-1928). He also managed the Saginaw Aces of the Michigan-Ontario League in 1920 and 1921.

== Later years ==
McKee died in Saginaw, Michigan at age 82.
