= Bachman, Ohio =

Unincorporated community in Ohio, U.S.

Coordinates: 39°51′46″N 84°27′28″W

Bachman is an unincorporated community in Montgomery County, in the U.S. state of Ohio.

== History ==
Bachman was named for its founder, C. Bachman. A post office called Bachman was established in 1863, and remained in operation until 1911. In 1909, Bachman had about 60 inhabitants.

== Notable person ==
Trader Horne, a Major League Baseball pitcher, was born at Bachman in 1899.
