= Art Jahn =

American baseball player (1895–1948)

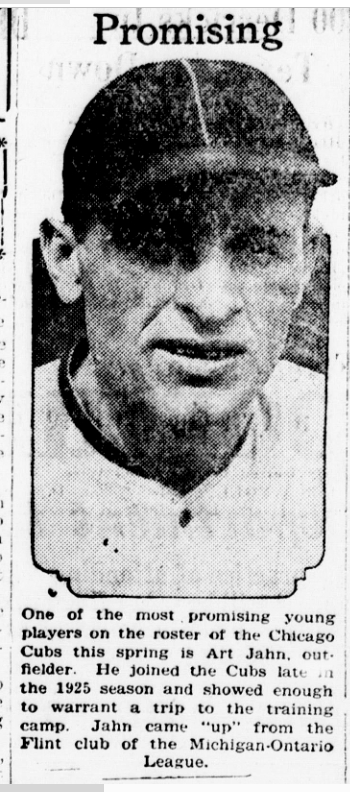
- Outfielder
- Born: December 2, 1895; Struble, Iowa, U.S.
- Died: January 9, 1948 (aged 52); Little Rock, Arkansas, U.S.
- Batted: Right Threw: Right

MLB debut
- July 2, 1925, for the Chicago Cubs

Last MLB appearance
- September 17, 1928, for the Philadelphia Phillies

MLB statistics
- Batting average: .278
- Home runs: 1
- Runs batted in: 55
- Stats at Baseball Reference

Teams
- Chicago Cubs (1925); New York Giants (1928); Philadelphia Phillies (1928)

Arthur Charles Jahn (December 2, 1895 – January 9, 1948) was an outfielder in Major League Baseball. He played for the Chicago Cubs, New York Giants, and Philadelphia Phillies.

In 104 games over two seasons, Jahn posted a .278 batting average (97-for-349) with 45 runs, 1 home run and 55 RBI. He finished his career with a .985 fielding percentage as an outfielder.
