= Battle Creek Custers =

Battle Creek Custer from 1919 to 1920

The Battle Creek Custers were a Michigan–Ontario League baseball team based in Battle Creek, Michigan, USA that played from 1919 to 1920. Notable players include Johnnie Heving, Trader Horne, Clarence Winters and Jim Wright.
