= Jack Beatty =

American historian (born 1945)

Jack J. Beatty (born May 15, 1945) is an American writer, senior editor of The Atlantic, and news analyst for On Point, the national NPR news program.

== Early life ==
Beatty was born and raised in the Dorchester neighborhood of Boston, Massachusetts.

He attended Boston Latin School, Boston State College, and the University of Massachusetts, Boston. He lives in Hanover, New Hampshire.

== Career ==
Beatty joined The Atlantic Monthly in 1983 as a senior editor. He previously worked as a book reviewer for Newsweek and as the literary editor of The New Republic.

In addition to editing many of The Atlantic's major nonfiction pieces, Beatty was also in charge of the book-review section. Beatty also wrote for the magazine himself, including on travel.

Beatty's 1992 biography of James Michael Curley was nominated for a National Book Critics' Circle award. His book Colossus: How the Corporation Changed America was commissioned by the Alfred P. Sloan Foundation.

== Awards ==
- 1990: Guggenheim Fellowship
- 1993: American Book Award
- 1993: L.L. Winship/PEN New England Award, The Rascal King: The Life and Times of James Michael Curley (1874-1958)
- Poynter Fellow at Yale University
- Two Alfred P. Sloan Foundation research grants
- William Allen White Award for Criticism
- Olive Branch Award for an Atlantic article on arms control

== Bibliography ==
- Beatty, Jack (1992). The Rascal King: The Life and Times of James Michael Curley, 1874–1958. Reading, Mass.: Addison-Wesley. ISBN 0201175991.
  - — (2000). The Rascal King: The Life and Times of James Michael Curley, 1874–1958 (Paperback ed.). New York: Da Capo Press. ISBN 9780306810022.
- — (August 1996). "A Race Too Far?". Politics. The Atlantic Monthly. 278 (2): 21–25.
- Jack Beatty, ed. (2001). Colossus: How the Corporation Changed America. Broadway Books. ISBN 978-0-7679-0352-3.
- "A Miserable Failure", The Atlantic, September 24, 2003
- Age of Betrayal: The Triumph of Money in America, 1865–1900. Random House. 2008. ISBN 978-1-4000-3242-6.
- Jack Beatty, ed. (2004). Pols: Great Writers on American Politicians from Bryan to Reagan. PublicAffairs. ISBN 978-1-58648-015-8.
- Beatty, Jack (1998). The World According to Peter Drucker. The Free Press. ISBN 978-0-684-83801-4.
- The Lost History of 1914: How the Great War Was Not Inevitable. London; Berlin [u.a.]: Bloomsbury, 2012. ISBN 978-1-408-82796-3.
