= Frank Gleich =

American baseball player (1894-1949)

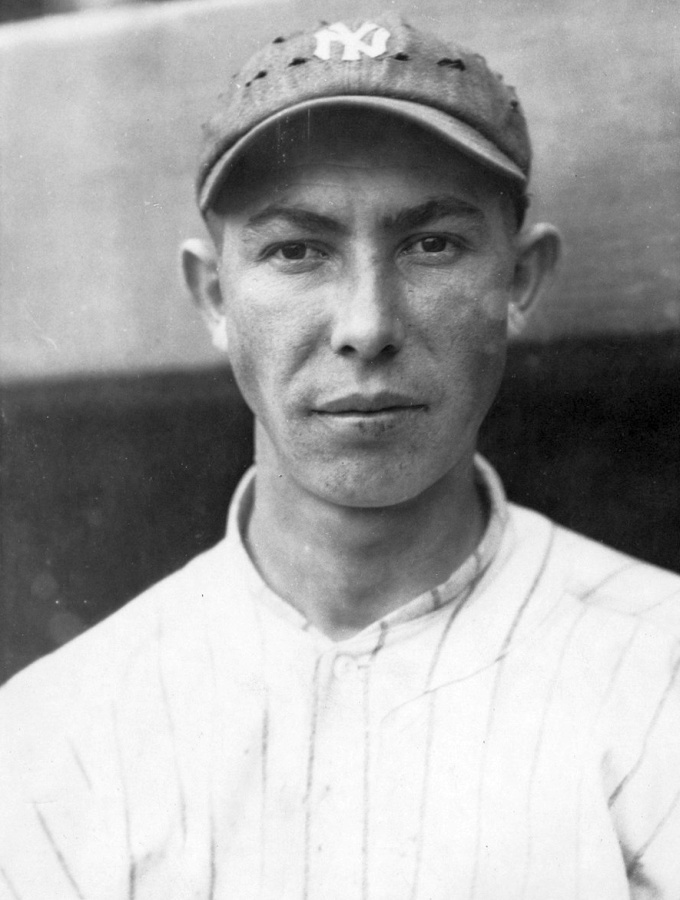
- Outfielder
- Born: March 7, 1894; Columbus, Ohio, U.S.
- Died: March 27, 1949 (aged 55); Columbus, Ohio, U.S.
- Batted: Right Threw: Right

MLB debut
- September 17, 1919, for the New York Yankees

Last MLB appearance
- August 31, 1920, for the New York Yankees

MLB statistics
- Batting average: .133
- Home runs: 0
- Runs batted in: 5
- Stats at Baseball Reference

Teams
- New York Yankees (1919–1920)

Frank Elmer Gleich [Inch] (March 7, 1894 – March 27, 1949) was a backup outfielder in Major League Baseball who played from 1919 through 1920 for the New York Yankees. Listed at 5 ft 11.5 in (1.82 m), 175 pounds (79 kg), Gleich batted left-handed and threw right-handed. He was born in Columbus, Ohio.

In a two-season career, Gleich was a .133 hitter (6-for-45) with six runs and five RBI in 29 games. He did not have any extra-base hits. He made 19 outfield appearances at left field (12), center (5) and right (2), committing four errors in 23 chances for a collective .826 fielding percentage.

Gleich later played in the Pacific Coast League. Following his baseball career, he worked as a police lieutenant for the Pennsylvania Railroad. He also served in the military during World War I. Gleich died at his home in Columbus, Ohio at age 55.
