= Buzz Wetzel =

American baseball player (1894-1941)

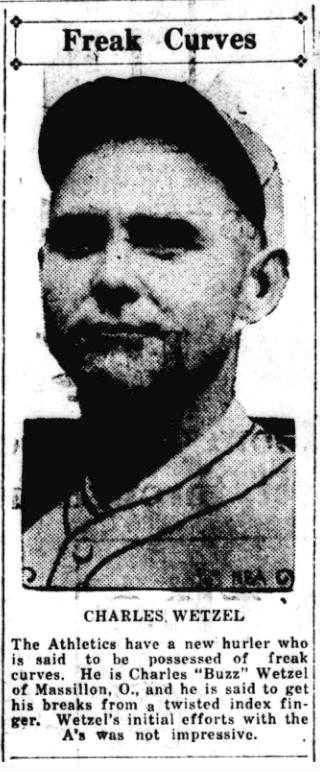
- Newspaper photo of Wetzel
- Pitcher
- Born: August 25, 1894; Jay, Oklahoma
- Died: March 7, 1941 (aged 46); Globe, Arizona
- Batted: Right Threw: Right

MLB debut
- July 25, 1927, for the Philadelphia Athletics

Last MLB appearance
- July 28, 1927, for the Philadelphia Athletics

MLB statistics
- Win–loss record: 0-0
- Earned run average: 7.71
- Strikeouts: 0
- Stats at Baseball Reference

Teams
- Philadelphia Athletics (1927)

Charles Edward "Buzz" Wetzel (August 25, 1894 – March 7, 1941) was a pitcher in Major League Baseball who played briefly for the Philadelphia Athletics during the 1927 season. Listed at 6 ft 1 in (1.85 m), 162 lb., Wetzel batted and threw right-handed. He was born in Jay, Oklahoma.

Wetzel was 32 years old when he entered the majors on July 27, 1927, and did not have a decision or strikeouts. Wetzel posted a 7.71 earned run average in two games, including one start, giving up four earned runs on eight hits and five walks in 4 2/3 innings of work. As a hitter, he went 1-for-1 with a run scored. He pitched his final game on July 28, and never appeared in a major league game again.

Following his majors career, Wetzel pitched and managed in the minor leagues. Wetzel died in Globe, Arizona, at the age of 46.
