= Bobby Byrne (baseball) =

American baseball player (1884–1964)

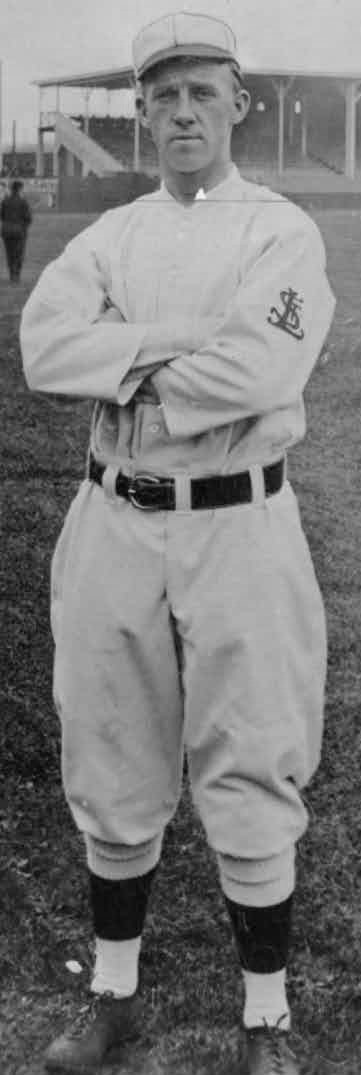
- Third baseman
- Born: December 31, 1884; St. Louis, Missouri, U.S.
- Died: December 31, 1964 (aged 80); Wayne, Pennsylvania, U.S.
- Batted: Right Threw: Right

MLB debut
- April 11, 1907, for the St. Louis Cardinals

Last MLB appearance
- September 4, 1917, for the Chicago White Sox

MLB statistics
- Batting average: .254
- Home runs: 10
- Runs batted in: 331
- Stats at Baseball Reference

Teams
- St. Louis Cardinals (1907–1909); Pittsburgh Pirates (1909–1913); Philadelphia Phillies (1913–1917); Chicago White Sox (1917)

Career highlights and awards
- World Series champion (1909)

Robert Matthew Byrne (December 31, 1884 – December 31, 1964) was an American third baseman in Major League Baseball. From 1907 through 1917, he played for the St. Louis Cardinals (1907–1909), Pittsburgh Pirates (1909–1913), Philadelphia Phillies (1913–1917) and Chicago White Sox (1917). Byrne batted and threw right-handed. He was born in St. Louis, Missouri.

== Baseball ==
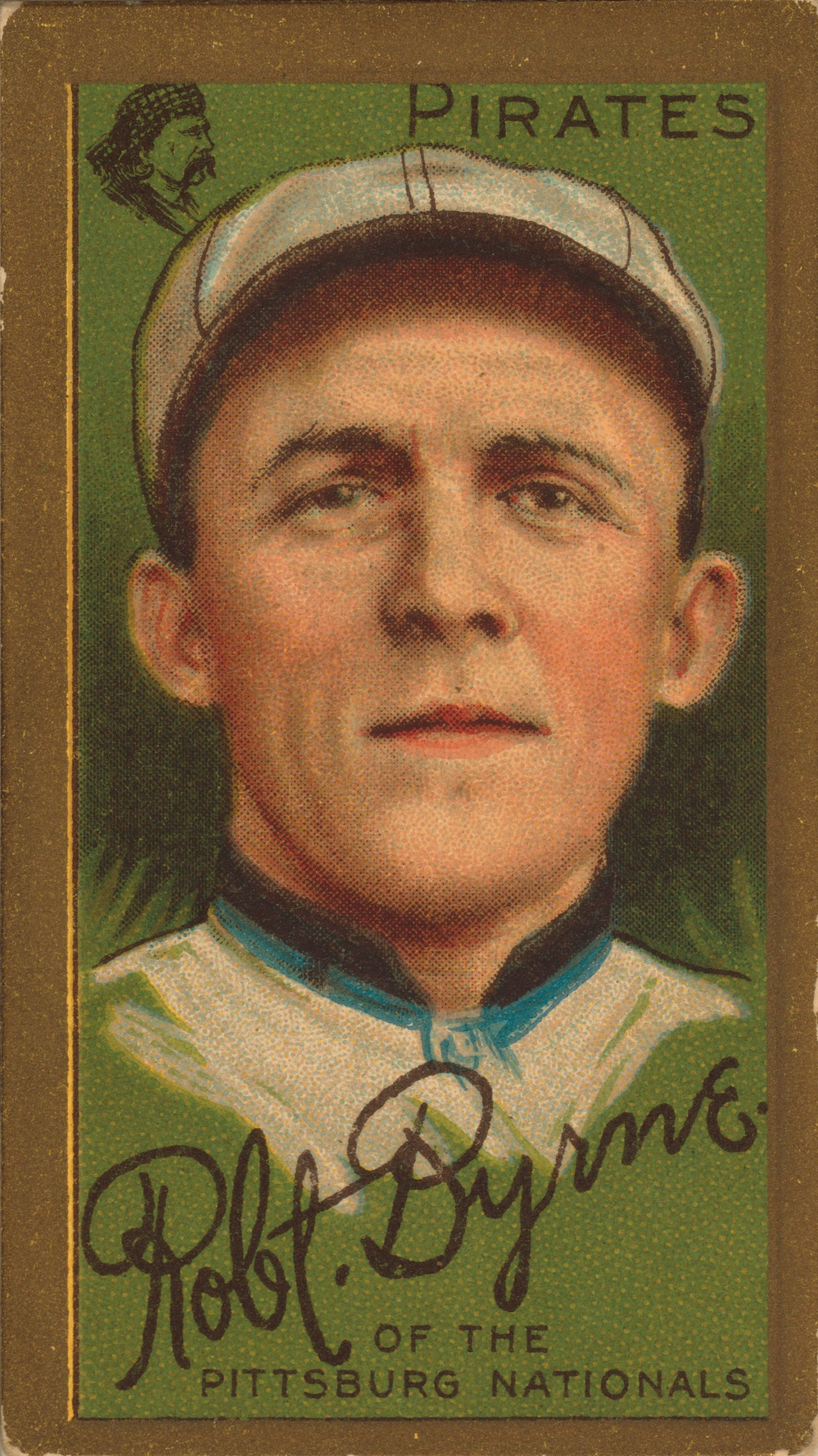
A 1911 trading card for Bobby Byrne.

The speedy Byrne was a defensive stalwart with excellent range. He started his major league career with the St. Louis Cardinals in 1907. Acquired by the Pittsburgh Pirates in late August 1909, Byrne made an immediate impact contributing down the stretch, and allowing Tommy Leach to remain in the center field. Used mainly in the leadoff spot by the Pirates, Byrne committed just two errors while hitting .256 with eight stolen bases.

Byrne enjoyed his most productive season in 1910, when he posted career-numbers in batting average (.296), runs batted in (52), runs (101), stolen bases (36), slugging percentage (.417), and led the National League with 178 hits and in doubles with 43 (also career highs).

Despite a low .259 batting average in 1911, Byrne scored 96 runs with 23 stolen bases and set career highs in triples (17) and games played (153). He raised his batting average to .288 in 1912, with 31 doubles, 11 triples, and 20 steals.

In the 1913 midseason, Byrne was traded by Pittsburgh pirates, along with pitcher Howie Camnitz to the Philadelphia Phillies in exchange for utility player Cozy Dolan and cash considerations. In 1917, he was selected off waivers by the Chicago White Sox from the Phillies, making his final major league appearance in the 1917 World Series.

In an 11-season career, Byrne was a .254 hitter (1225-for-4831) with 10 home runs and 331 runs batted in during 1283 games. He also collected 176 stolen bases and posted an above average walk-to-strikeout ratio of 2.07 (456-to-220).

== Soccer ==
Byrne played soccer in the St. Louis Soccer League during the off-season. However, When he signed with the Pirates, team president Barney Dreyfuss ordered him to give it up.

Following his baseball career, Byrne became the owner of a bowling alley in St. Louis.

Bobby Byrne passed away in Wayne, Pennsylvania on his 80th birthday.

== See also ==
- List of Major League Baseball annual doubles leaders
- List of Major League Baseball career stolen bases leaders

== Sources ==
- Baseball Library
- Career statistics from Baseball Reference · Retrosheet · Baseball Almanac
- The Deadball Era
