= Harry Shriver =

American baseball player (1896-1970)

- Pitcher
- Born: September 2, 1896; Wadestown, West Virginia
- Died: January 21, 1970 (aged 73); Morgantown, West Virginia
- Batted: Right Threw: Right

MLB debut
- April 14, 1922, for the Brooklyn Robins

Last MLB appearance
- April 20, 1923, for the Brooklyn Robins

MLB statistics
- Win–loss record: 4–6
- Earned run average: 3.12
- Strikeouts: 39
- Stats at Baseball Reference

Teams
- Brooklyn Robins (1922–1923)

Harry Graydon Shriver (September 2, 1896 – January 21, 1970), nicknamed "Pop", was a pitcher in Major League Baseball. He pitched for the Brooklyn Robins during the 1922 and 1923 baseball seasons. He attended West Virginia Wesleyan College.
