= Joe Kiefer =

American baseball player (1899–1975)

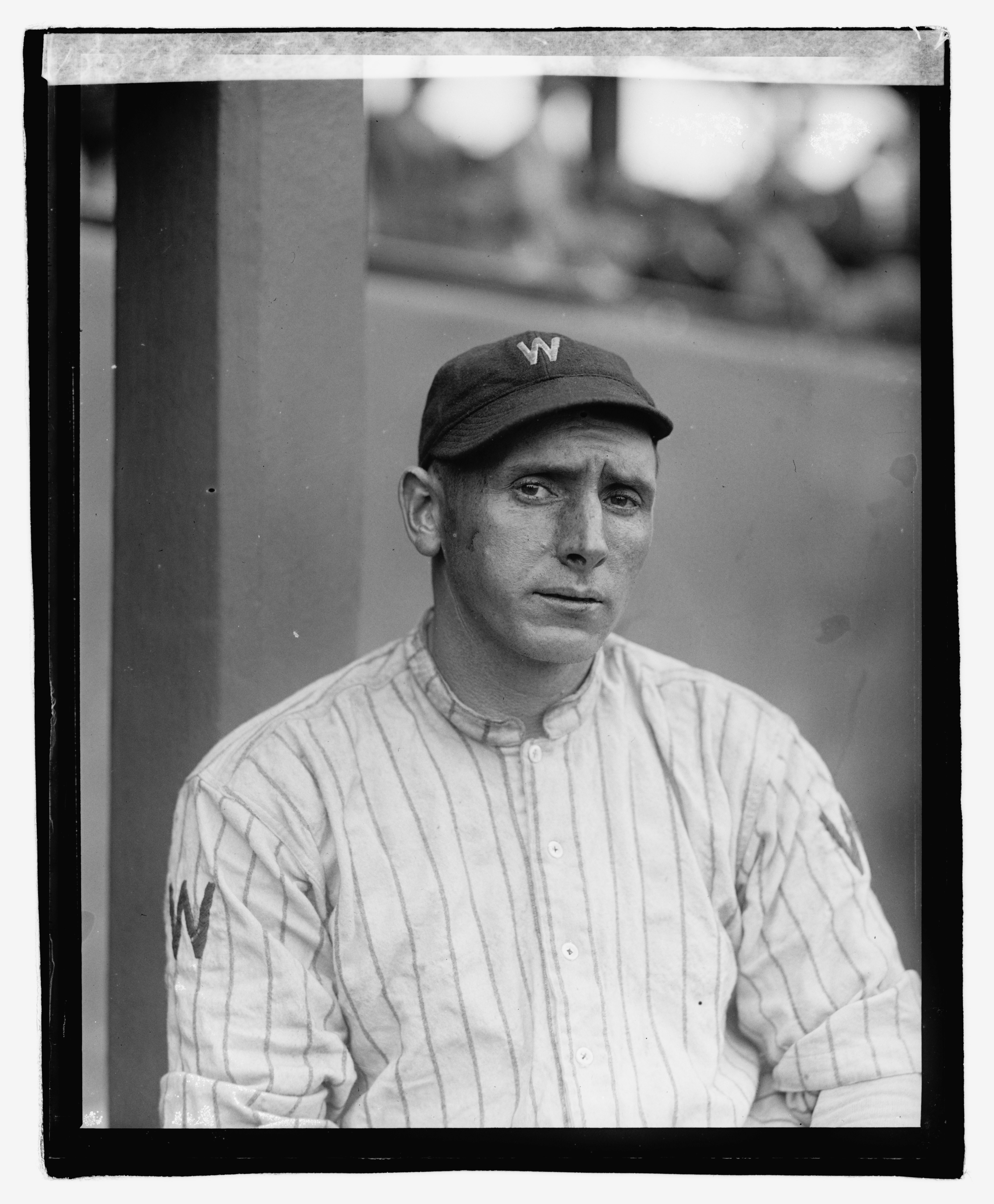
- Pitcher
- Born: July 19, 1899; West Leyden, New York, U.S.
- Died: July 5, 1975 (aged 75); Utica, New York, U.S.
- Batted: Right Threw: Right

MLB debut
- October 1, 1920, for the Chicago White Sox

Last MLB appearance
- May 25, 1926, for the Boston Red Sox

MLB statistics
- Win–loss record: 0–5
- Earned run average: 6.16
- Strikeouts: 9
- Stats at Baseball Reference

Teams
- Chicago White Sox (1920); Boston Red Sox (1925–1926)

Joseph William Kiefer (July 19, 1899 – July 5, 1975) was an American pitcher in Major League Baseball who played for the Chicago White Sox and Boston Red Sox. Listed at 5 ft 11 in (1.80 m), 190 lb., Kiefer batted and threw right-handed. He was born in West Leyden, New York.

In a three-season career, Kiefer posted a 0–5 record with a 6.16 ERA in 15 appearances, including four starts, nine strikeouts, and 49 2/3 innings of work. He also pitched in the minors for 21 years and served in the U.S. Army during World War I.

Kiefer died in Utica, New York at age 75.
