= Bill Cristall =

American baseball player (1875-1939)

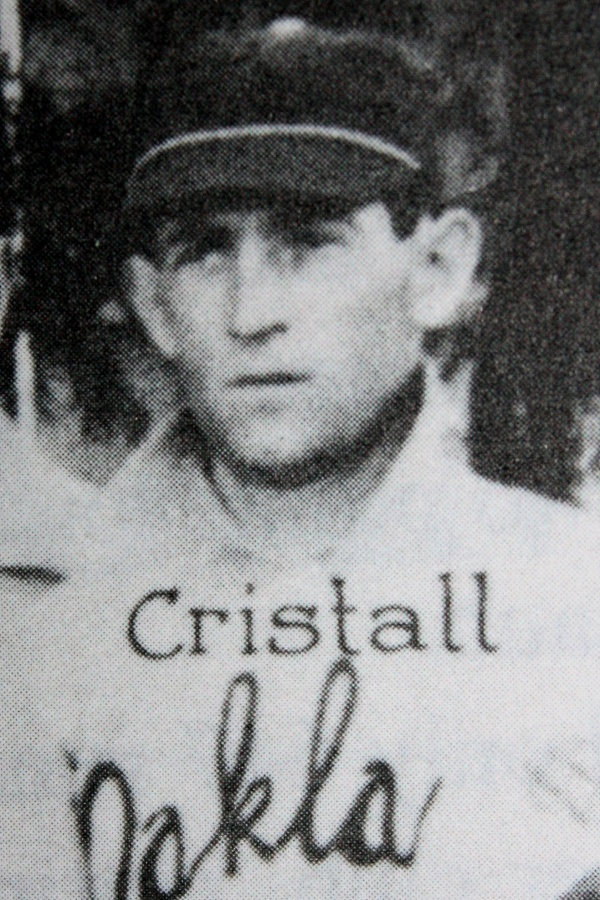
- Pitcher
- Born: September 12, 1875; Odessa, Russian Empire
- Died: January 28, 1939 (aged 63); Buffalo, New York, U.S.
- Batted: Left Threw: Left

Major league debut
- September 3, 1901, for the Cleveland Blues

Last major league appearance
- September 28, 1901, for the Cleveland Blues

Major league statistics
- Win–loss record: 1–5
- Earned run average: 4.84
- Strikeouts: 12
- Stats at Baseball Reference

Teams
- Cleveland Blues (1901)

William Arthur Cristall (September 12, 1875 - January 28, 1939) was an American professional baseball pitcher who played in the major leagues with the Cleveland Blues in 1901. Cristall batted and threw left-handed. His playing height and weight were listed as 5 foot 7 inches and 145 lbs. He was Jewish.

== Baseball career ==
Cristall made his major league debut on September 3, 1901. His time in the major leagues was short, as he only started and pitched in six career games. His career numbers were not so impressive, as his win-loss record would be 1–5, although he did pitch 5 complete games and his one win was a shutout. Although he had very few at bats, he was a respectable hitter, especially for a pitcher, as he had 7 hits in 20 at-bats, including two hits for triples, and finished with a career .350 batting average.

Cristall finished his career with a fielding percentage of .957, making only one error in his six starts. His last game would be on September 28, 1901. He was the first of three major league players to have been born in what is now Ukraine (the other two being Reuben Ewing and Izzy Goldstein). He died on January 28, 1939, in Buffalo, New York.
