= George Orme =

American baseball player (1891–1962)

- Outfielder
- Born: September 16, 1891; Lebanon, Indiana, U.S.
- Died: March 17, 1962 (aged 70); Indianapolis, Indiana, U.S.
- Batted: Right Threw: Right

MLB debut
- September 14, 1920, for the Boston Red Sox

Last MLB appearance
- September 17, 1920, for the Boston Red Sox

MLB statistics
- Batting average: .333
- Home runss: 0
- Runs batted in: 1
- Stats at Baseball Reference

Teams
- Boston Red Sox (1920)

George William Orme (September 16, 1891 – March 16, 1962) was an American backup outfielder in Major League Baseball who played briefly for the Boston Red Sox during the 1920 season. Listed at 5' 10", 160 lb., Orme batted and threw right-handed. He was born in Lebanon, Indiana.

In a four-game career, Orme was a .333 hitter (2-for-6) with four runs, one RBI, and a .556 on-base percentage without home runs.

Orme died at the age of 70 in Indianapolis, Indiana.

== See also ==
- 1920 Boston Red Sox season
