= Al Bashang =

American baseball player and manager (1888–1967)

- Left fielder
- Born: August 22, 1888; Cincinnati, Ohio, U.S.
- Died: June 23, 1967 (aged 78); Cincinnati, Ohio, U.S.
- Batted: Both Threw: Right

MLB debut
- July 30, 1912, for the Detroit Tigers

Last MLB appearance
- July 13, 1918, for the Brooklyn Robins

MLB statistics
- Batting average: .118
- Home runs: 0
- Runs batted in: 0
- Stats at Baseball Reference

Teams
- Detroit Tigers (1912); Brooklyn Robins (1918)

Albert C. "Ollie" Bashang, sometimes written as "Al Baschang" (August 22, 1888 – June 23, 1967) was an American baseball outfielder and manager. He played professional baseball for 18 years from 1910 to 1927, including two brief stints in Major League Baseball with the Detroit Tigers in 1912 and the Brooklyn Robins in 1918. He also served as manager of the Evansville Evas from 1920 to 1921.

== Early years ==
Bashang was born in 1888 in Cincinnati.

== Professional baseball ==
Bashang appeared in six games for the Detroit Tigers in July 1912 and two games for the Brooklyn Robins in 1918. In Detroit, he played five games in left field, accompanied by Hall of Famers Ty Cobb in center field and Sam Crawford in right field. He had a perfect fielding percentage for the Tigers, but his batting average was .083.

He also appeared in two games for the Brooklyn Robins in 1918. He had one hit and five at bats and had no errors and an assist on his only outfield chance. He concluded his major league career with a perfect 1.000 fielding percentage on seven chances.

In addition to his two brief stints in the majors, Bashang played 18 seasons of minor league baseball from 1910 to 1927, including stints with the Junction City Soldiers (1910), Newton Railroaders (1911), Lexington Colts (1911–1912), Saginaw Ducks (1913–1915), South Bend Benders (1916–1917), Omaha Rourkes (1918–1919), Evansville Evas (1919–1921), Saginaw Aces (1923–1925), Wilkes-Barre Barons (1927), and the Wheeling Stogies (1927). He also served as a minor league manager at Evansville in 1920 and 1921.

== Family and later years ==
Bashang was married to Edna Klaus Bashang. He had a son, Jack. Bashang died in Cincinnati in 1967 at the age of 78. He was buried at the Vine Street Cemetery in Cincinnati.
