= London Tecumsehs =

Canadian baseball team

The historic London Tecumsehs were a professional men's baseball team in London, Ontario, Canada, that were first formed in 1868 — a merger of the Forest City Base Ball Club and the London Base Ball Club — which, according to George Railton's 1856 London directory, consisted of officers J.K. Brown, Dr. J. Wilkinson and J.D. Dalton and 22 players who practiced twice a week on the military grounds (today's Victoria Park). They were named for Shawnee chief Tecumseh.

Originally, the Tecumsehs also played their home games at the military reserve in Victoria Park, before moving to the old fairgrounds on the block just northeast of Victoria Park, bounded by today's Pall Mall Street on the north, Wellington Street on the west, Central Avenue on the south and Waterloo Street on the east.

An article in The New York Times from 1875 reports that "The Tecumseh Baseball Club, of London, Ontario, beat the Ætnas, of Detroit, the champions of Michigan, at London, Ontario, yesterday. Score, 15 to 6." This game in 1875 would have been played at the above-mentioned old fair grounds in London.

Then in 1877, the Tecumsehs moved to Tecumseh Park (today's Labatt Park) in the then-London suburb of Petersville, also known as London West.

During the 1930s, the London Tecumsehs were a men's hockey team playing in the International Hockey League, playing their home games at the now-demolished London Arena at Bathurst and Ridout streets in London, Ontario.

Today, the name remains in use by numerous youth baseball teams in London, Ontario, a softball team in London, and also a vintage base ball team whose home field is at Fanshawe Pioneer Village, a living history museum in London, Ontario.

== Early baseball in Canada ==
Adapted from the British game of rounders — and by extension, cricket — the game of base ball or "townball" became popular in the early 19th century in Southwestern Ontario (then Canada West or Upper Canada), New York State and New England.

The first documented evidence of a base ball game in Canada comes from a letter published in Sporting Life magazine in 1886, a letter by Dr. Adam E. Ford of Denver, Colorado, formerly of St. Marys, Ontario, and Beachville, Ontario, about a game 48 years earlier in Beachville on June 4, 1838 — Militia Muster Day.

Originally, the rules of the game were informal in nature and often modified to reflect regional preferences.

== Origins ==
The merger of the Forest City and London Base Ball clubs to form the London Tecumsehs occurred in June 1868 with John Brown as president — a team sponsored by the Tecumseh House hotel on the southwest corner of York and Richmond streets, immediately north of today's Canadian National railway tracks, which was demolished in the 1920s.

In 1868, the Tecumsehs lost to the Woodstock, Ontario Young Canadians 89–46 in a five-hour game. Woodstock later defeated Guelph Maple Leafs 36-29 to win the Canadian Silver Ball Championship.

During the early 1870s, the major rivals of the London Tecumsehs were the Guelph Maple Leafs who were sponsored by brewer/sportsman George Sleeman, proprietor of Silver Creek Brewery, and the Woodstock Young Canadians. The Guelph Maple Leafs were the first Ontario team to hire professional ball players from the United States to strengthen their team.

When Jacob L. Englehart, a wealthy pioneer London oil refiner from Cleveland, Ohio, (and future vice president of Imperial Oil), became the president and financial backer of the Tecumsehs in late 1875, he too began looking for professional players from the U.S., later signing four Americans: first-baseman/manager George "Juice" Latham, pitcher Fred Goldsmith, catcher Phil Powers and infielder/outfielder Joe Hornung.

In addition to Englehart, the Tecumsehs' back-room movers and shakers consisted of London newspaperman Harry Gorman, Ed Moore, manager of the Tecumseh House, Richard Meredith, a future chief justice of the Supreme Court of Ontario, William Southam, who was to found Southam News and to add an egalitarian touch, Jim Jury, a janitor at the collegiate institute.

Goldsmith's first complete game with the Tecumsehs occurred on May 24, 1876, when London played Guelph before 6,000 spectators at the old Fair Grounds, a contest that London won 8–7 in 10 innings, largely due to Goldsmith's "scientific pitching", using his innovative "skew ball." (Goldsmith went on to pitch for the Troy, New York, Trojans in 1879 and the Chicago White Stockings from 1880 to 1884.)

After the military reserve was donated to the City for a public park in 1874, public protests in 1875 against the Tecumseh's use of a fenced area of the park prompted the club to move their games to the old Fair Grounds northeast of today's Central Avenue and Wellington Street, where they played until the end of the 1876 season, during which they defeated Guelph for the Canadian championship.

The Tecumsehs joined the fledgling five-team Canadian Association of Base Ball in 1876 (London Tecumsehs, Hamilton Standards, Guelph Maple Leafs, Kingston St. Lawrence and Toronto Clippers). The Tecumsehs won the Canadian title in 1876.

In 1877, the Tecumsehs joined the International Association of Professional Base Ball Players made up of London, Guelph, Ontario, and several U.S. teams, a league created as a rival to the National League.

The Association's by-laws and constitution required member teams to pay $10 to join the league (plus an additional $15 to compete for the championship) and fan admission was set at 25 cents. Visiting teams were guaranteed $75, plus half of the gate receipts when they exceeded that amount ($75).

Pitcher Candy Cummings was the International Association's first president in 1877, while he was a player with the Lynn Live Oaks in Massachusetts.

== Tecumseh Park ==
For the 1877 season, the Tecumsehs moved into the newly outfitted, 6-acre (24,000 m^{2}) Tecumseh Park in the village of Petersville on the west side of the forks of the Thames River (now the City-owned Labatt Memorial Park) with Richard Southam, brother of William Southam, founder of the Southam newspaper chain, the team manager. (London-born George (Mooney) Gibson, catcher for the 1909 World Series Champions, the Pittsburgh Pirates, was a nephew of the Southams).

Both the London Tecumsehs and Tecumseh Park were named after the Shawnee Chief Tecumseh who fought alongside the British against the U.S. during the War of 1812. Chief Tecumseh died during the Battle of the Thames near Chatham, Ontario, in October 1813.

While the Tecumsehs were charter members of the International Association, the team (like all teams in the league) continued to play many ball games against teams in other leagues. One of the first games played in the new stadium took place on Saturday, May 5, 1877, against the Hartfords of Brooklyn, New York.

The new field was lauded for its many amenities, including a 600-seat grandstand, piped-in water for maintaining the grass and facilities for scorers, telegraph operators and reporters. London won the International Association pennant in 1877 by defeating the Pittsburgh Allegheny 5–2.

== 1877 International Association final standings ==
(compiled by Ray Nemec of the Society for American Baseball Research)

London Tecumsehs 14-4-2*
Pittsburgh Allegheny 13-6-0
Rochester (The Rochesters), New York 10-8-0
Manchester (The Manchesters), New Hampshire 9-10-0
Columbus Buckeyes 9-11-2
Guelph Maple Leafs 4-12-0
Lynn (Massachusetts) Live Oaks 1-9-0 * disbanded

- London's star pitcher, Fred Goldsmith, believed by many to be the co-inventor of the curveball along with Candy Cummings, had a 14–4 record in 193 innings pitched with 3 shutouts, during International Association play in 1877.

Although the 1878 Tecumseh home opener attracted 4,000 fans, the crowds subsequently started to drop off and the team fell into debt.

Despite a London Free Press account about the Tecumsehs on 21 June 1939 (Fred Goldsmith Invented The Curve Ball), that stated the team defeated the Chicago White Sox in three straight games to win the title series in 1878, it appears the writer was in error, instead referring to a two-game series in 1877 between the Tecumsehs and the Chicago White Stockings.

On August 22, 1878, the club folded due to insufficient patronage.

== Bryce's 1876 and 1877 Base Ball Guides ==
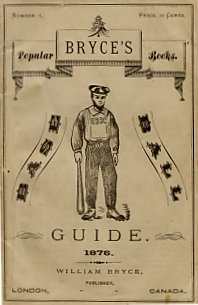
Front cover to Bryce's Base Ball Guide 1876, published in London, Ont.

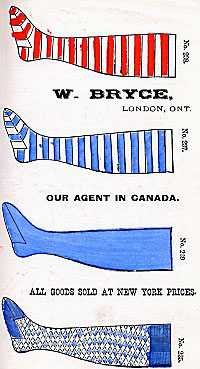
Baseball socks for sale in Bryce's Base Ball Guide 1876

A treasure-trove of information about early Canadian base ball came to light in 2002 when Library and Archives Canada purchased (for $10,000 from an Ottawa, Ontario, bookseller) Bryce's Base Ball Guide of 1876 and Bryce's Base Ball Guide of 1877, two hand-coloured, 75-page booklets published by William Bryce of London, Ontario, which were originally sold for a dime.

The two 4-by-7-inch (100 by 180 mm) guides are considered to be the first significant publications on Canadian baseball. Bryce, a Scottish-born bookseller, news agent and sporting goods distributor in London, had a small stake in the Tecumsehs, considered by many to be the finest ball team in the entire Dominion of Canada.

During U.S. President George W. Bush's visit to the Library and Archives Canada building on November 30, 2004, he showed a special interest in these two early Canadian baseball books which were laid out for his perusal.

== London Tecumsehs resurrected ==
A new Tecumseh team was resurrected in 1888 and 1889 in the International Association with Patsy Donovan one of its most notable outfield stars, and later in the 1920s in the Michigan-Ontario Baseball League. (Charlie Gehringer, a future Detroit Tigers star and Hall of Famer, played second base for the 1924 Tecumsehs.)

On September 15, 1920, with Ty Cobb in the lineup, the Detroit Tigers defeat the London Tecumsehs 5-4 before 3,000 people at Tecumseh Park in exhibition baseball. Reserved seating was $1.

The 1920 the Tecumsehs clinched the first-place pennant with 15 games to play and London led the Michigan-Ontario league in attendance, with an astonishing 100,686 people watching them play.

On May 9, 1921, under manager George Gibson, the Pittsburgh Pirates beat the London Tecumsehs 8–7 at Tecumseh Park before 3,500 people in an exhibition baseball game. Before the game, Gibson and his team is presented with a silver loving cup by the London Kiwanis Club. Gibson thrills the locals by catching the opening inning with his 1909 battery mate Babe Adams and singling and scoring a run in his lone at-bat. London Mayor Sid Little entertained the team that evening at his home.

On September 14, 1921, the Tecumsehs won the Michigan-Ontario Baseball League championship, 1-0 over Bay City, Michigan, before 1,000 people at Tecumseh Park. London scores its lone run in the first inning when third baseman Doc Shay, playing his first game of the series because of illness, triples and scores on a sacrifice fly. In three games of the series, London pitcher Frank Herbst of London allowed six hits and only one run in 33 innings. London advances against Ludington, Michigan, champions of the Central League.

On September 28, 1921, London won the best-of-seven series against Ludington 4–3, taking Game 7 10–7 at Grand Rapids, Mich. The Tecumsehs were down 3–1 in the series. A few days later, London manager Henry Buzz Wetzel was presented with a gold watch to commemorate the win. The normally reserved Wetzel speaks, saying, "Tried to do what was right and give you the best I had, and I honestly believe that the fans here have a right to be proud of their baseball team."

On May 23, 1923, Washington's pitching ace Walter Johnson is in uniform but does not pitch as the Washington Senators defeat the Tecumsehs 13–9 in an exhibition baseball game at Tecumseh Park.

American baseball historians Bill Weiss and Marshall Wright have placed the 1920 London Tecumsehs of the Michigan–Ontario League on the list of the Top 100 Minor League Baseball Teams of all-time—coming in at #52, with a record of 86 wins and 32 losses.

== Labatt Memorial Park ==
On December 31, 1936, Tecumseh Park was donated to the City of London by the Labatt Brewing Company along with $10,000 for improvements, on the provisos that the park be renamed the "John Labatt Memorial Athletic Park" and remain a public athletic and recreational field in perpetuity.

From a sociological-historical perspective, it could be argued that the name change from Tecumseh Park to Labatt Memorial Park highlights the dramatic shift from 19th-Century colonial Canada (where the Shawnee Chief Tecumseh was immortalized throughout Canada West for siding with the British in the War of 1812) to more modern times where businesses such as the Labatt Brewing Company became very influential.

Today, Labatt Park is believed the world's oldest baseball grounds in continuous use in its original location. The park was designated under the Ontario Heritage Act in 1994, with the by-law reasons for designation amended in 1996 to include the circa-1937 Roy McKay Clubhouse, home to the London Majors of the Intercounty Baseball League.

== Sources ==
- The Northern Game: Baseball the Canadian Way by Bob Elliott (Sport Classic, 2005).
- Heritage Baseball: City of London a souvenir program from July 23, 2005, celebrating the history of Labatt Park and London, Ontario's 150th anniversary as an incorporated city.
- Boys of Summer: Knute, Boot, Milky and Buck by Don Maudsley (SCENE, London, Ontario, June 15, 2000).
- The magic continues at London's Field of Dreams by Barry Wells (SCENE, London, Ontario, June 15, 2000).
- Canada's Baseball Capital Celebrates 143rd Year by William Humber (page 36 of the London Majors Baseball Club, 1998 Souvenir Program).
- Diamonds of the North: A Concise History of Baseball in Canada by William Humber (Oxford University Press, 1995).
- The Beaver, Exploring Canada's History, Baseball's Canadian Roots: Abner Who? by Mark Kearney (October–November 1994).
- The 1948 London Majors: A Great Canadian Team by Dan Mendham (unpublished academic paper, UWO, December 7, 1992).
- Diamond Rituals: Baseball in Canadian Culture by Robert K. Barney, (Meckler Books, 1989).
- Journal of Sport History, A Critical Examination of a Source in Early Ontario Baseball: The Reminiscence of Adam E. Ford by UWO Professor Robert K. Barney and Nancy Bouchier (Vol. 15, No. 1, Spring 1988).
- Who's Who in Canadian Sport by Bob Ferguson, (Summerhill Press Ltd., 1985).
- Cheering for the Home Team: The Story of Baseball in Canada by William Humber, (The Boston Mills Press, 1983).
- Old Time Baseball and the London Tecumsehs of the late 1870s by Les Bronson, a recorded (and later transcribed) talk given to the London & Middlesex Historical Society on February 15, 1972. Available in the London Room of the London Public Library, Main Branch.
- Bill Stern's Favorite Baseball Stories by Bill Stern, (Blue Ribbon Books, Garden City, New York, 1949).
- Some Baseball History, Both Amateur and Professional, in the City of London, Synopsis of Tecumsehs, the Renowned Champions of Early Days by Frank Adams, for 58 years a member of The London Advertiser staff, pages 214-217 of The Canadian Science Digest, March, 1938, published monthly in London, Ontario, Canada, by Walter Venner.
- An Eight-Page Indenture/ Instrument #33043 between The London and Western Trusts Company Limited, The Corporation of The City of London and John Labatt, Limited, dated December 31, 1936, and registered on title in the Land Registry Office for the City of London on January 2, 1937, conveying Tecumseh Park to the City of London along with $10,000 on the provisos that the athletic field be preserved, maintained and operated in perpetuity "for the use of the citizens of the City of London as an athletic field and recreation ground" and that it be renamed "The John Labatt Memorial Athletic Park."
