= Trader Horne (baseball) =

American baseball player (1899–1983)

- Pitcher
- Born: April 12, 1899; Bachman, Ohio, U.S.
- Died: February 3, 1983 (aged 83); Franklin, Ohio, U.S.
- Batted: Both Threw: Right

MLB debut
- April 24, 1929, for the Chicago Cubs

Last MLB appearance
- July 11, 1929, for the Chicago Cubs

MLB statistics
- Win–loss record: 1–1
- Earned run average: 5.09
- Strikeouts: 6
- Stats at Baseball Reference

Teams
- Chicago Cubs (1929)

Berlyn Dale Horne (April 12, 1899 – February 3, 1983) was an American relief pitcher in Major League Baseball who played briefly for the Chicago Cubs during the 1929 season. Listed at 5' 9", 155 lb., Horne was a switch-hitter and threw right-handed. He was born in Bachman, Ohio.

In his one season in the majors, Horne posted a 1–1 record with a 5.09 ERA in 11 appearances, including one start, six strikeouts, 21 walks, 24 hits allowed, and 23 innings of work without a save. However, Horne's minor league baseball career spanned 22 seasons from 1917 to 1938, including several seasons in the Pacific Coast League. He won over 200 games in the minors during his career.

Horne died at the age of 83 in Franklin, Ohio.

== Fact ==
- His nickname was in reference to explorer Trader Horn.
