= Marty Griffin (baseball) =

American baseball player (1901–1951)

Bill Grevell
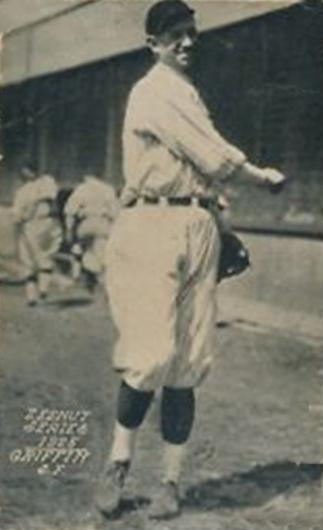
- Griffin in 1925
- Born: September 2, 1901; San Francisco, California, U.S.
- Died: November 19, 1951 (aged 50); Los Angeles, California, U.S.

MLB debut
- July 25, 1928, for the Boston Red Sox

Last MLB appearance
- September 7, 1928, for the Boston Red Sox

MLB statistics
- Win–loss record: 0–3
- Earned run average: 5.02
- Strikeouts: 9
- Stats at Baseball Reference

Teams
- Boston Red Sox (1928)

Martin John Griffin (September 2, 1901 – November 19, 1951) was an American pitcher in Major League Baseball who played briefly for the Boston Red Sox during the 1928 season. Listed at 6 feet 2 inches (1.88 metres) and 200 pounds (91 kg), Griffin batted and threw right-handed. He was born in San Francisco, California.

In one season career, Griffin posted a 0–3 record with a 5.02 earned run average in 11 appearances, including three starts nine strikeouts, 17 walks, 42 hits allowed, and 37 2/3 innings of work.

Griffin died at the age of 50 in Los Angeles, California.
