= Les Nunamaker =

American baseball player (1889–1938)

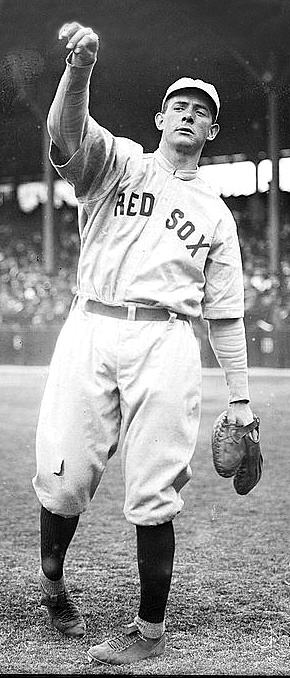
- Nunamaker in 1912
- Catcher
- Born: January 25, 1889; Malcolm, Nebraska, U.S.
- Died: November 14, 1938 (aged 49); Hastings, Nebraska, U.S.
- Batted: Right Threw: Right

MLB debut
- April 28, 1911, for the Boston Red Sox

Last MLB appearance
- September 5, 1922, for the Cleveland Indians

MLB statistics
- Batting average: .268
- Home runs: 2
- Runs batted in: 216
- Stats at Baseball Reference

Teams
- Boston Red Sox (1911–1914); New York Yankees (1914–1917); St. Louis Browns (1918); Cleveland Indians (1919–1922)

Career highlights and awards
- 2× World Series champion (1912, 1920)

Leslie Grant Nunamaker (January 25, 1889 – November 14, 1938) was an American catcher for the Boston Red Sox (1911–14), New York Yankees (1914–17), St. Louis Browns (1918) and Cleveland Indians (1919–22).

He helped the Red Sox win the 1912 World Series and the Indians win the 1920 World Series. Until being injured in early in the 1912 season against the St. Louis Browns, Nunamaker was Bill Carrigan's primary backup catcher for the Red Sox. He was also a backup catcher for the 1920 Indians.

In 12 seasons, Nunamaker played in 716 games and had 1,990 at bats, 194 runs, 533 hits, 75 doubles, 30 triples, 2 home runs, 216 runs batted in, 36 stolen bases, 176 walks, .268 batting average, a .332 on-base percentage, .339 slugging percentage, 674 total bases and 49 sacrifice hits.

Nunamaker is one of several catchers who hold the major league record for runners thrown out in an inning. While playing for the New York Yankees in 1914, Nunamaker threw out three baserunners at second base in one inning against the opposing Detroit Tigers, remaining the only catcher ever to accomplish that feat.

He died in Hastings, Nebraska at the age of 49 after a period of failing health.
