= Claral Gillenwater =

American baseball player (1900–1978)

- Pitcher
- Born: May 20, 1900; Sims, Indiana, U.S.
- Died: February 26, 1978 (aged 77); Bradenton, Florida, U.S.
- Batted: Right Threw: Right

MLB debut
- August 20, 1923, for the Chicago White Sox

Last MLB appearance
- September 8, 1923, for the Chicago White Sox

MLB statistics
- Win–loss record: 1–3
- Earned run average: 5.48
- Strikeouts: 2
- Stats at Baseball Reference

Teams
- Chicago White Sox (1923)

Claral Lewis Gillenwater (May 20, 1900 – February 26, 1978) was an American pitcher in Major League Baseball. He played for the Chicago White Sox in 1923.
