= Concord Marines =

- 1886–1907; (1886, 1902–1905, 1907); Concord, New Hampshire

Minor league affiliations
- Class: Independent (1886); Class B (1902–1905); Class D (1907)
- League: New Hampshire State League (1886); New England League (1902–1905); New Hampshire League (1907)

Major league affiliations
- Team: None

Minor league titles
- League titles (1): 1905

Team data
- Name: Concord (1886); Concord Marines (1902–1905); Concord (1907)
- Ballpark: White Park*

The Concord Marines were a minor league baseball team based in Concord, New Hampshire. Between 1886 and 1907, Concord teams played as members of the New Hampshire State League in 1886, New England League from 1902 to 1905 and New Hampshire League in 1907, winning the 1905 league championship.

During a 1904 game, the Marines ran short on players due to illness and inserted their mascot, a 9-year-old boy, into the game.

== History ==
=== 1886: New Hampshire State League ===
In 1886, minor league baseball began in Concord, when the "Concord" team joined the five–team Independent level New Hampshire State League. The 1886 New Hampshire League featured teams in Concord, who joined with teams in the New Hampshire cities of Manchester (Manchester hosted three teams, including West Manchester and "Amoskeag"), and Nashua.

The 1886 Concord roster, standings and record are unknown.

=== 1902 to 1905: New England League / one championship ===
In 1902, the Concord "Marines" resumed minor league play, when Concord became members of the eight–team Class B level New England League. The Marines ended the season in fourth place with a record of 58–53, as John Carney served as manager. Concord finished 16.5 games behind first place Manchester team, as no playoffs were held, common in the early minor league era.

Continuing league play, the Concord Marines placed fourth in the 1903 New England League standings. With a record of 63–47. playing under returning manager John Carney and Frank Eustace, the Marines finished 7.5 games behind the first place Lowell Tigers in the final standings.

An oddity occurred during a Concord game on June 25, 1904, playing at Lowell. During the game, Concord became short on players after their center fielder was ejected and their second baseman became ill and was unable to continue playing. As a result, Concord put a young boy, who was serving as their team mascot into the game to play. The nine-year-old boy, named George Dwiggins, likely became the youngest player to appear in a professional game. It was reported that Dwiggins played right field and struck out in his only at bat.

The Concord Marines placed fifth in the 1904 New England League standings. With a 62–62 record under manager Nathan Pulsifer, Concord ended the 1904 New England League season 20.5 games behind the first place Haverhill Hustlers (82–41).

The 1905 Concord Marines were the New England League champions. With their first-place finish in the final standings, the Concord Marines won the championship. Concord finished the season with a record of 69–39 to place first in the final standings under manager Frank Eustace. Concord finished the season, 2.0 games ahead the second place Fall River Indians, who had a 66–40 record.

Despite winning the championship the in 1905, the Concord franchise folded following the 1905 season and did not return to the 1906 New England League. They were replaced in the eight-team league by the Lawrence Colts.

=== 1907: New Hampshire State League / brief season ===
Concord played their final season in 1907, as Concord returned to membership in the Class D level New Hampshire State League. The team ended the season with a 2-7 record while playing under manager A. Long. The New Hampshire State League began play in the 1907 season as a Class D level league. It was an eight–team league that began play on May 11, 1907. During the 1907 season, the New Hampshire State League folded four teams. A meeting was held on June 17, 1907, where the league was restructured and changed its name to the Vermont State League, beginning play July 2, 1907 without a Concord franchise.

The standings for the New Hampshire State League were affected by four franchises who did not play the complete season. The standings through June 29, 1907, were Barre-Montpelier Intercities 19–6, Burlington Burlingtons 13–12, West Manchester 11–12, Laconia/Plattsburgh Brewers 8–14, East Manchester 7–7, Franklin 5–7, Nashua 3–3 and Concord 2–7.

Concord, New Hampshire was without minor league baseball for over a century, until the 2016 New Hampshire Wild began play as members of the Independent level Empire Professional Baseball League.

== The ballpark ==
The name of the home minor league ballpark for the Concord minor league teams is not directly referenced. Established in the 1890s, White Park was noted to have hosted baseball in the era, with a ballfield constructed around 1900. White Park is on the National Register of Historic Places and is still in use today as a public park with ballfields.

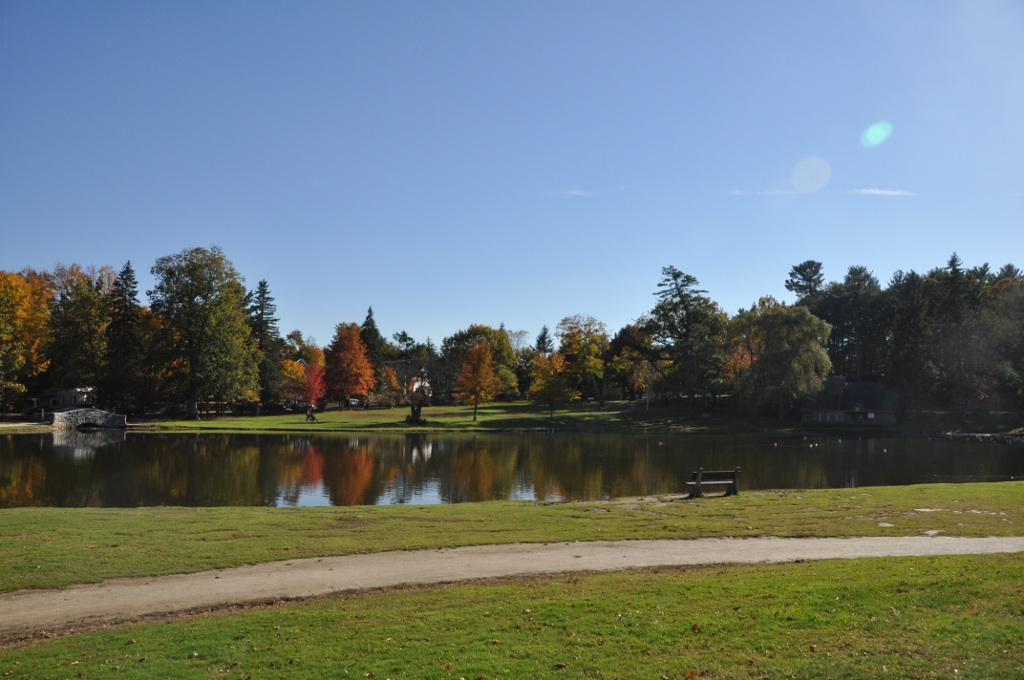
(2012) Concord, New Hampshire. White Park Pond

== Timeline ==
Year(s)	# Yrs.	Team	Level	League	Ballpark
1886	1	Concord	Independent	New Hampshire State League	Unknown
1902–1905	4	Concord Marines	Class B	New England League	White Park*
1907	1	Concord	Class D	New Hampshire State League	White Park*

== Year–by–year records ==
Year	Record	Finish	Manager	Playoffs/Notes
1886	00–00	NA	NA	League records unknown
1902	58–53	4th	John Carney	No playoffs held
1903	63–47	4th	Jack Carney / Frank Eustace	No playoffs held
1904	62–62	5th (tie)	Nathan Pulsifer	No playoffs held
1905	69–39	1st	Frank Eustace	League champions
1907	2–7	NA	A. Long	League folded July 2

== Notable alumni ==
- Joe Berry (1903)
- Jack Carney (1902–1903, MGR)
- Win Clark (1904)
- Doc Curley (1905)
- Tom Doran (1902)
- Sam Edmonston (1905)
- Frank Eustace (1905, MGR)
- Sam Frock (1905)
- Joe Harris (1903)
- Charlie Hastings (1904)
- Malachi Hogan (1902)
- Buck Hooker (1902–1903)
- Happy Iott (1902)
- Charlie Jordan (1904)
- Joe Knotts (1905)
- Jack McAleese (1902)
- Arch McCarthy (1903)
- Nate Pulsifer (1903)
- Hack Schumann (1903)
- John Titus (1903)
- Irv Young (1904)
- Elmer Zacher (1905)

== See also ==
- Concord Marines players
