= Northern New York League =

Defunct American baseball league

- Classification: Independent (1900–1901); Class D (1902); Independent (1903–1905)
- Sport: Minor League Baseball
- First season: 1900
- Folded: 1905
- Replaced by: Northern Independent League
- No. of teams: 10
- Country: United States of America
- Related competitions: New York State League

The Northern New York League was a Minor League Baseball circuit that operated in a span of six seasons between 1900 and 1905. League franchises were located in New York and Vermont. For the majority of its existence it operated as an independent league, except in 1902, when was classified as Class D circuit. In 1906, the league changed names to the Northern Independent League as Ottawa joined Burlington, Montpelier-Barre, Plattsburgh and Rutland in the league.

== Cities represented and teams ==
- Burlington, VT - Burlington (1903–1905)
- Canton, NY - Canton (1901)
- Gouverneur, NY - Gouverneur (1900)
- Malone, NY - Malone (1900–1902)
- Montpelier, VT / Barre, VT – Montpelier-Barre (1904–05)
- Ogdensburg, NY - Ogdensburg (1900–01)
- Plattsburgh, NY - Plattsburgh (1901–1905)
- Potsdam, NY - Potsdam (1900–1902)
- Rutland, VT - Rutland (1903–1905)
- St. Albans, VT - St. Albans (1902–1904)

== MLB alumni ==
- Doc Amole
- Al Boucher
- Jack Coombs
- Pep Deininger
- Jack Doscher
- Tommy Dowd
- Bob Dresser
- Pat Duff
- Cy Ferry
- Eddie Grant
- Leo Hafford
- Doc Hazelton
- Paul Krichell
- Bill Lauterborn
- Billy Lauder
- Frank Leary
- Louis LeRoy
- Billy Lush
- Mike Lynch
- Cotton Minahan
- Jim Mullen
- Tom O'Hara
- Harry Pattee
- Frank Shannon
- Dave Shean
- Dike Varney
- Rube Vickers
- Joe Wall
- Jack Warner
- Libe Washburn
- Jimmy Wiggs

== Sources ==
- Baseball Reference - Northern New York League Encyclopedia and History
