= Franklin (minor league baseball) =

- 1907; Franklin, New Hampshire

Minor league affiliations
- Class: Class D (1907)
- League: New Hampshire State League (1907)

Major league affiliations
- Team: None

Minor league titles
- League titles (0): None

Team data
- Name: Franklin (1907)
- Ballpark: Unknown (1907)

The Franklin team was a minor league baseball team based in Franklin, New Hampshire. In 1907, the Franklin team played briefly as a member of the Class D level New Hampshire State League and was without a known moniker, common in the era.

== History ==
The Franklin, New Hampshire team began play in the 1907 New Hampshire State League. The 1907 Class D level, eight–team league began play on May 11, 1907. During the 1907 season, the New Hampshire State League folded four teams, Franklin included. A meeting was held on June 17, 1907, where the league was restructured and changed its name to the Vermont State League, beginning play July 2, 1907. Franklin did not play in the new league, having already folded.

Franklin played the partial 1907 season under managers Barney McLaughlin and O'Brien. The final standings for the New Hampshire State League include Franklin as one of the four franchises who did not play the complete season, with Franklin folding after compiling a record of 5–7. The standings through June 29, 1907, were Barre-Montpelier Intercities 19–6, Burlington Burlingtons 13–12, West Manchester 11–12 and Laconia/Plattsburgh Brewers 8–14. The four teams that folded were East Manchester 7–7, Franklin 5–7, Nashua 3–3 and Concord 2–7.

Franklin, New Hampshire has not hosted another minor league team.

== The ballpark ==
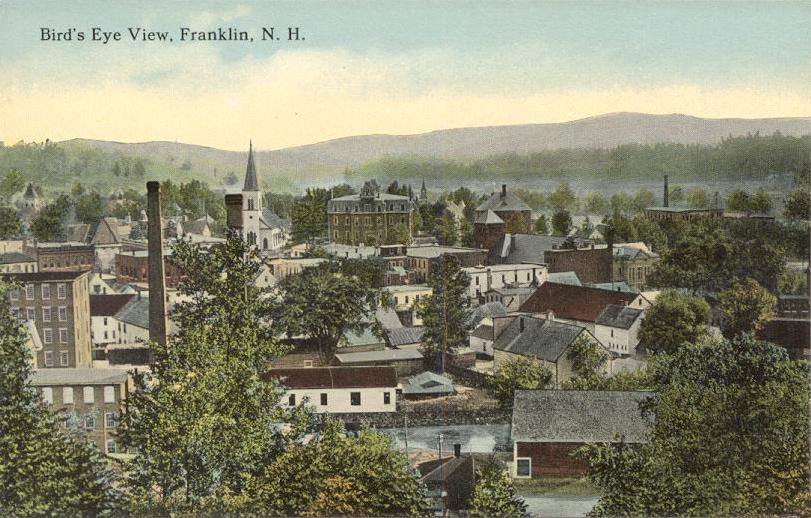
(1912) Bird's-eye View, Franklin, New Hampshire

The name and location of the 1907 Franklin home minor league ballpark is not directly referenced. It is noted the ballpark had field dimensions of 330–390–330. Odell Park was in use as a public park in the era, located along the Winnipesaukee River. Numerous Indian artifacts were uncovered during the building of ballfields in Odell Park. Odell Park is still a public park with ballfields, located at 125 Memorial Street, Franklin, New Hampshire.

== Year–by–year record ==
Year	Record	Finish	Manager	Playoffs/Notes
1907	5–7	NA	Barney McLaughlin / O'Brien	League folded July 2

== Notable alumni ==
- Barney McLaughlin (1907, MGR)
- Roster information for the 1907 Franklin team is unknown.
