= Rutland Sheiks =

- 1924; (1887, 1907, 1924); Rutland (city), Vermont

Minor league affiliations
- Class: Independent (1887, 1907); Class B (1924)
- League: Northeastern League (1887); Vermont State League (1907); Ontario–Quebec–Vermont League (1924)

Major league affiliations
- Team: None

Minor league titles
- League titles (1): 1887

Team data
- Name: Rutland (1887, 1907); Rutland Sheiks (1924)
- Ballpark: Unknown

The Rutland Sheiks were a minor league baseball team based in Rutland, Vermont in 1924. The Sheiks were preceded by Rutland teams in 1887 and 1907, without nicknames. The Rutland teams played as members of the 1887 Northeastern League, 1907 Vermont State League and 1924 Ontario–Quebec–Vermont League, winning the 1887 league championship.

== History ==
In 1887, the Rutland team began play as members of the Independent level Northeastern League. The 1887 Rutland team won the Northeastern League championship with a 16–6 record, managed by James Harmon. The five–team league began play on July 6, 1887 and the Rutland team was followed by St. Albans (19–9), Burlington (13–17), Malone (3–10) and Montpelier (2–13) in the final standings.

Rutland again hosted minor league baseball in 1907. The New Hampshire State League began play in the 1907 season as a Class D level league but was restructured during the season. The New Hampshire State League was an eight–team league that began play on May 11, 1907, and did not include Rutland. The New Hampshire League teams through June 29, 1907, were Barre-Montpelier Intercities, Burlington Burlingtons, West Manchester, Laconia/Plattsburgh Brewers, East Manchester, Franklin, Nashua and Concord.

Rutland began play after the league folded four teams and changed its name to the Vermont State League, beginning play July 2, 1907. A meeting was held on June 17, 1907, where the New Hampshire State League was restructured.

The Vermont State League continued play as an Independent four–team league beginning, July 2, 1907, without the previous New Hampshire franchises. The new franchise in the Vermont State League was Rutland, who joined the New Hampshire League Champion Barre-Montpelier Intercities, the Burlington Burlingtons and Plattsburgh Brewers in the newly formed Vermont State League. Rutland was managed by T.K. Milne and placed third in the final standings. The Barre-Montpelier Intercities led in the final standings of the Vermont League with a 12–4 record. Barre-Montpelier was followed by the Burlington Burlingtons (6–5), Rutland (5–8) and the Plattsburgh Brewers (5–11). The Vermont League permanently folded after the 1907 season ended on July 28, 1907.

In 1924, minor league baseball returned when the Rutland Sheiks began play when the Eastern Canada League expanded and added teams to become the Ontario–Quebec–Vermont League. The league was formed from the efforts of Canadian Pacific Railway sports promoter Joseph Page and retired Major League Baseball pitcher Jean Dubuc, a Vermont native. Page had founded the Eastern Canada league as well and was president of both leagues, while Dubuc became the player/manager of the Ottawa franchise. For travel, the two made efforts to structure the league with franchises based in towns having Canadian Pacific stops.

T"Sheiks" moniker corresponds with the 1919 novel The Sheik, a best–selling book at the time, written by Edith Maude Hull. Based on the novel, the motion picture The Sheik (film) was released in 1921 starring Rudolph Valentino. The movie was a huge box office hit.

The Rutland Sheiks began Ontario–Quebec–Vermont League play on May 15, 1924 under manager Punch Daly, but folded before the conclusion of the season. The six–team Class B level league featured the Montreal Royals, Ottawa-Hull Senators and Quebec Bulldogs with three new franchises, the Montpelier Goldfish, Outremont Canadiens (Montreal's second team) and the Rutland Sheiks. The league played the season in two halves, but the two new Vermont based franchises, the Rutland Sheiks with a 34–20 record and Montpelier Goldfish (16–37) both folded on July 15, 1924. The four remaining Ontario–Quebec–Vermont League teams continued play after losing the two franchises. but Quebec Bulldogs won both half seasons and were the champions as no playoffs were held. The final overall standings were won by Quebec Bulldogs (66–40), followed by the Montreal Royals (54–55), Outremont Canadiens (49–58) and Ottawa-Hull Senators (46–55). The league permanently folded after completing the season on September 3, 1924. Rutland has not hosted another minor league team.

Rutland, Vermont later became home of the collegiate Rutland Royals who played in the Northern League, an early summer collegiate league, from 1938 to 1941 and 1946 to 1950.

== The ballpark ==
The name of the home minor league ballpark of the Rutland teams is not referenced. St. Peter's Field, which was home to the Rutland Royals, was in use in the era and is still in use today.

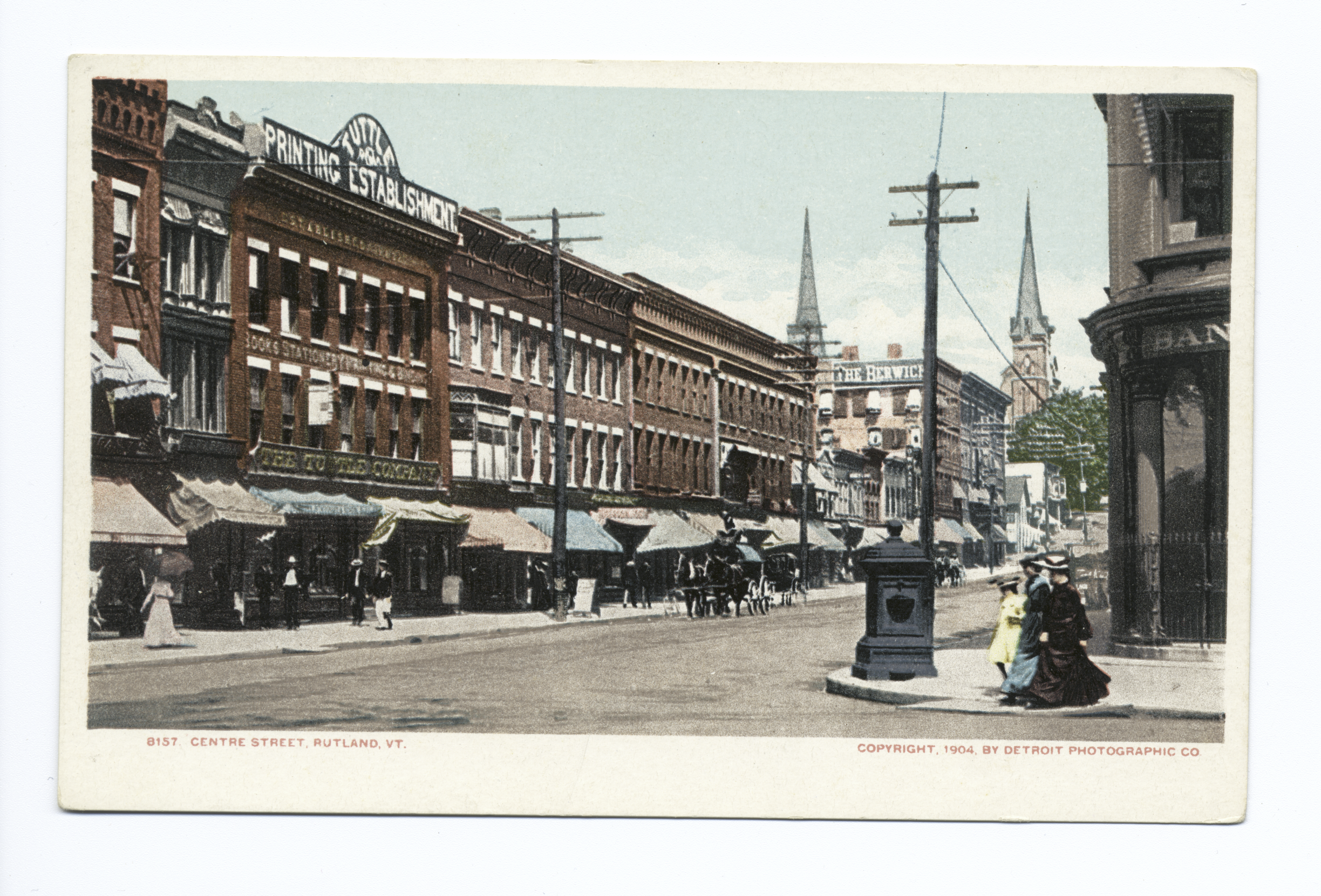
Centre Street, Rutland, Vt.

== Timeline ==
Year(s)	# Yrs.	Team	Level	League
1887	1	Rutland	Independent	Northeastern League
1907	1	Rutland	Independent	Vermont State League
1924	1	Rutland Sheiks	Class B	Ontario–Quebec–Vermont League

== Year–by–year records ==
Year	Record	Finish	Manager	Playoffs/Notes
1887	16–6	1st	James Harmon	League records unknown
1907	5–8	3rd	T.K. Milne	League disbanded July 29
1924	34–20	NA	Punch Daly	Team folded July 15

== Notable alumni ==
- John Keefe (1887)
- Bill McCorry (1924)
- Dick Rudolph (1907)

=== See also ===
Rutland (minor league baseball) players
Rutland Sheiks players
