= Plattsburgh Brewers =

- 1895–1907; (1895–1896, 1901–1907); Plattsburgh, New York

Minor league affiliations
- Class: Independent (1895–1896, 1901, 1903–1903, 1907); Class D (1902, 1907)
- League: Eastern International League (1895); International League (1896); Northern New York League (1901–1905); Independent Northern League (1906); New Hampshire State League (1907); Vermont State League (1907)

Major league affiliations
- Team: None

Minor league titles
- League titles (1): 1901

Team data
- Name: Plattsburgh (1895–1896, 1901–1906); Laconia/Plattsburgh Brewers (1907); Plattsburgh Brewers (1907)
- Ballpark: Clinton Park (1902–1907)

The Plattsburgh Brewers were a minor league baseball team based in Plattsburgh, New York. Between 1895 and 1907, Plattsburgh teams played as members of the Eastern International League (1895), International League (1896), Northern New York League (1901–1905), Independent Northern League (1906), New Hampshire State League (1907) and Vermont State League (1907), winning the 1901 league championship. The Plattsburgh teams hosted minor league home games at Clinton Park.

Baseball Hall of Fame member Eddie Collins played for Plattsburgh in 1906, losing his collegiate eligibility in playing for the team, before making his major league debut later in the 1906 season.

== History ==
Plattsburgh was home to semi-pro teams before minor league baseball. Baseball Hall of Fame member George Davis was reported to be the mascot as a teenager for a Plattsburgh team in 1886.

Minor league baseball began in Plattsburgh in 1895, when the Plattsburgh team became members of the Independent Eastern International League. The Plattsburgh team and the league have no official standings as Plattsburgh was managed by Durocher. Plattsburgh played with teams representing Farnham, New York, Hull, Massachusetts, Malone, New York, Montreal, Quebec, St. Albans, Vermont, and St. Hyacinthe, Quebec.

In 1896, the same lineup of Eastern International League teams continued play in the newly named International League. The Plattsburgh team and the league have no official statistics for 1896. Durocher again served as the Plattsburgh manager.

In 1901, Plattsburgh won the championship in the Northern New York League. Plattsburgh began play as members of the four–team Independent Northern New York League, the first of five seasons that Plattsburgh played in the league. Managed by A.E. Reynolds, the Plattsburgh team ended the Northern New York League season with a record of 15–6, finishing first in the league standings. Other league members were Canton, New York (7–13), Malone, New York (15–7), Ogdensburg (4–14) and Potsdam, New York (9–10).

The Northern New York League continued play in 1902, again as a four–team league, receiving Class D status for one season. Reynolds again managed the Plattsburgh team, as the 1902 league standings are unknown. The 1902 Northern New York League members were Malone, Plattsburgh, Potsdam and St. Albans.

The Plattsburgh team was so popular in 1902 and the subsequent seasons, that six trolley cars per hour would travel to Clinton Park, home of the Plattsburgh team. Clinton Park seated 3,000 fans. 25 cents was the cost for a Plattsburgh baseball game ticket and a ride on a trolley car.

Plattsburgh played in the 1903 four–team Independent Northern New York League. There are no known standings. Other league members were Burlington, Vermont, Rutland, Vermont, and St. Albans.

Plattsburgh continued play in the 1904 Northern New York League. Other members were Burlington, Montpelier–Barre (Vermont), Rutland and St. Albans.

Callahan managed the 1905 Plattsburgh team, who played with Burlington, Montpelier–Barre and Rutland in the Independent Northern New York League.

Plattsburgh began the 1906 season in the newly named Independent Northern League. Burlington, Montpelier-Barre and Rutland joined with Ottawa, Ontario, in playing in the 1906 Northern Independent League. Plattsburgh was managed by Billy Lush and folded before the end of the season, as the team had a poor record and attendance was low.

Baseball Hall of Fame member Eddie Collins played for Plattsburgh in 1906. Collins was an area native attending Columbia College in New York City at the time. He lost his senior season of eligibility at Columbia after it was discovered Collins had played as a professional for Plattsburgh. However, the Philadelphia Athletics discovered Collins playing in 1906, and owner/manager Connie Mack signed Collins to a contract. Collins then debuted for the Athletics in 1906.

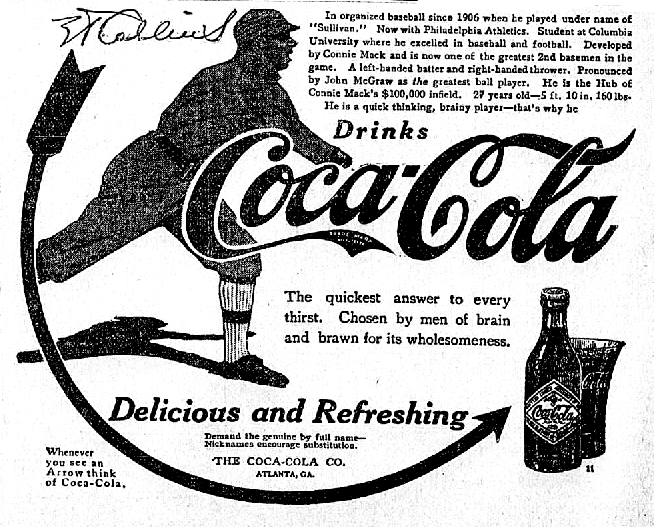
Eddie Collins. 1914 Coke ad with reference to his 1906 season. The Times-Dispatch. (Richmond, Va.), 05 July 1914. Chronicling America: Historic American Newspapers. Library of Congress. <http://chroniclingamerica.loc.gov/lccn/sn85038615/1914-07-05/ed-1/seq-6/>

In 1907, Plattsburgh played in two leagues during the season. Plattsburgh partnered with Laconia, New Hampshire, to field a team together, playing in the 1907 New Hampshire State League, which began play in the season as a Class D league. The Laconia/Plattsburgh Brewers began play in the eight–team league on May 11, 1907, under manager W. Van Duzen. However, the league folded four teams and changed its name to the Vermont State League midway through the season. A meeting was held on June 17, 1907, where the league was restructured. Plattsburgh remained in the Vermont State League, beginning play July 2, 1907.

The standings for the New Hampshire State League reflected four franchises which folded early in the 1907 season. The Brewers finished fourth among the four teams who finished the New Hampshire League portion of the season. The New Hampshire League final standings on June 29, 1907, were Barre-Montpelier Intercities 19–6, Burlington Burlingtons 13–12, West Manchester (New Hampshire) 11–12, Laconia/Plattsburgh Brewers 8–14, East Manchester (New Hampshire) 7–7, Franklin, New Hampshire 5–7, Nashua, New Hampshire 3–3, and Concord, New Hampshire 2–7.

The franchise continued play as the Plattsburgh Brewers in the Independent four–team Vermont State League, beginning July 2, 1907. W. Van Duzen continued as manager. Rutland, Vermont, joined the Barre-Montpelier Intercities, Burlington Burlingtons and Plattsburgh Brewers in Vermont State League play. The Brewers finished fourth with a 5–11 record in the final standings of the 1907 Vermont State League. Plattsburgh finished behind the champion Barre-Montpelier Intercities 12–4, Burlington Burlingtons 6–5 and Rutland 5–8. The league concluded play on July 28, 1907. The league folded following the 1907 season. Plattsburgh has not hosted another minor league team.

== The ballpark ==
Beginning in 1902, Plattsburgh, the Laconia/Plattsburgh Brewers and Plattsburgh Brewers hosted home minor league games at Clinton Park. The ballpark had a capacity of 3,000. The ballpark site today is a field off U.S. Route 9 on the shore of Lake Champlain in Plattsburgh. After minor league baseball left, Clinton Park closed in 1916.

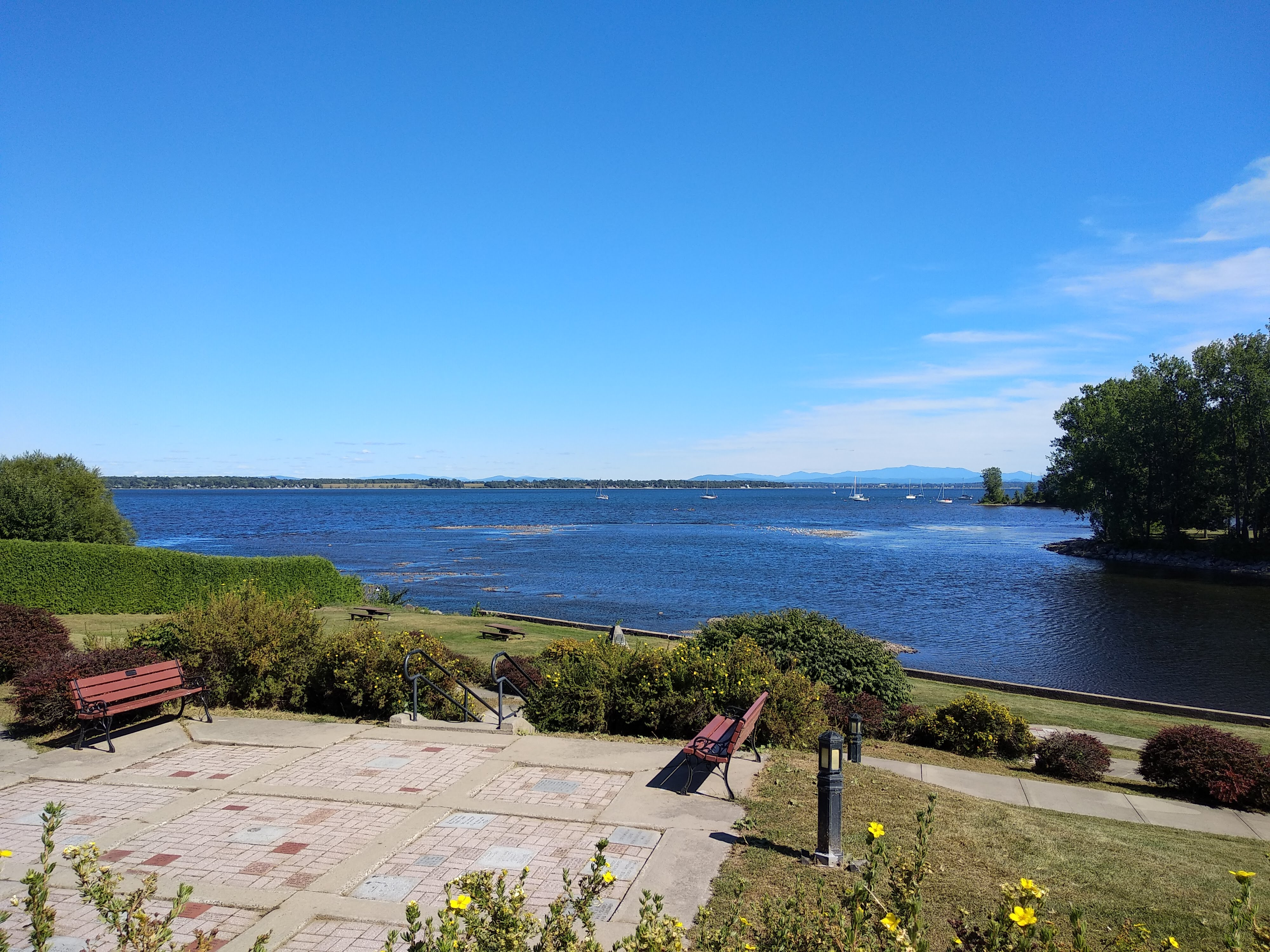
(2018) Cumberland Bay, Lake Champlain, Plattsburgh New York

== Timeline ==
Year(s)	# Yrs.	Team	Level	League
1895	1	Plattsburgh	Independent	Eastern International League
1896	1	Plattsburgh	Independent	International League
1901	1	Plattsburgh	Independent	Northern New York League
1902	1	Plattsburgh	Class D	Northern New York League
1903–1905	3	Plattsburgh	Independent	Northern New York League
1906	1	Plattsburgh	Independent	Northern Independent League
1907 (1)	1	Laconia/Plattsburgh Brewers	Class D	New Hampshire State League
1907 (2)	1	Plattsburgh Brewers	Independent	Vermont State League

== Notable alumni ==
- Eddie Collins (1906) Inducted Baseball Hall of Fame, 1939
- Doc Amole (1905)
- Jack Doscher (1901)
- Pat Duff (1901)
- Leo Hafford (1905)
- Paul Krichell (1905)
- Billy Lauder (1905)
- Billy Lush (1905–1906)
- Bill McCorry (1906
- Mike O'Neill (1901)
- Chick Robitaille (1901)
- Henry Thielman (1901)
- Charles Moran (1901)
- Red Morgan (1901)
- Jim Mullen (1901)
- Harry Pattee (1906)
- Libe Washburn (1905–1906)
- Snake Wiltse (1906)

== See also ==
- Plattsburgh (baseball) players
