= Ontario–Quebec–Vermont League =

Minor league baseball league that played in the 1924 season

- Formerly: Eastern Canada League (1922–1923)
- Classification: Class B (1924)
- Sport: Minor League Baseball
- Founder: Joseph H. Page; Jean Dubuc
- First season: 1924
- Folded: September 3, 1924
- President: Joseph H. Page (1924)
- No. of teams: 8
- Country: Canada; United States of America
- Most titles: 1 Quebec Bulldogs (1924)

The Ontario–Quebec–Vermont League was a minor league baseball league that played in the 1924 season. The Class B level league directly evolved from the 1922–1923 Eastern Canada League. The 1924 Ontario–Quebec–Vermont League consisted of teams based in Canada and the United States.

== History ==
The Eastern Canada League was a Class B level minor league that began play in 1922, with franchises based entirely in Canada. The four–team league played for two seasons. Three of the teams remained when the league evolved to become the 1924 Ontario–Quebec–Vermont League.

In 1922, the Eastern Canada League began play as a Class B league and was founded by Joseph H. Page, who also served as league president. The four–team circuit was composed of the Montreal Royals (55–69), Ottawa Senators (68–57), Trois Rivieres Trios (69–53) and Valleyfield/Cap de la Madeleine Madcaps (56–69). Valleyfield moved to Cap de la Madeleine on July 29, 1922. Montreal and Ottawa would become stable franchises and form the foundation of the Ontario–Quebec–Vermont League.

In their final season of play, the 1923 Class B level Eastern Canada League featured the Montreal Royals (66–51) Ottawa Canadiens (62–52), Quebec Bulldogs (47–62) and Trois Rivieres Trios/Montreal (52–62). In mid season 1923, Trois-Rivières moved to Montreal. Ottawa played some home games in Montreal while its own ballpark was being built. The Montreal Royals won the first–half pennant and the Ottawa Canadiens won the second–half pennant. In the playoffs, Montreal defeated Ottawa 8 games to 7.

In 1924, the Eastern Canada League expanded and added teams to become the Ontario–Quebec–Vermont League. The league was formed from the efforts of Canadian Pacific Railway sports promoter Joseph Page and retired Major League Baseball pitcher Jean Dubuc, a Vermont native. Page had founded the Eastern Canada league as well and was president of both leagues, while Dubuc became the player/manager of the Ottawa franchise. For travel, the two made efforts to structure the league with franchises based in towns having Canadian Pacific stops.

The new league began play on May 15, 1924, structured as a six–team Class B level league with franchises based in locations indicative of the league name. The Montreal, Ottawa and Quebec franchises remained and three expansion franchises were added.

The charter Ontario–Quebec–Vermont League members featured three new franchises, the Montpelier Goldfish (Vermont), Outremont Canadiens (Montreal's second team) and Rutland Sheiks (Vermont). They joined the Montreal Royals, Ottawa-Hull Senators and Quebec Bulldogs. The league played the season in two halves. The Quebec Bulldogs won both half seasons and were the champions as no playoffs were held. The final overall standings were won by Quebec Bulldogs (66–40). Quebec was followed by the Montreal Royals (54–55), Outremont Canadiens (49–58) and Ottawa-Hull Senators (46–55). The two new Vermont based franchises, the Rutland Sheiks (34–20) and Montpelier Goldfish (16–37) both folded on July 15, 1924. The four remaining Ontario–Quebec–Vermont League teams continued play after losing two franchises, but the league permanently folded after completing the season on September 3, 1924.

== 1924 Ontario–Quebec–Vermont League teams ==
Team name(s)	City represented	Ballpark	Year(s) active
Montpelier Goldfish	Montpelier, Vermont	Hubbard Park	1924
Montreal Royals	Montreal, QC	Atwater Park	1924
Ottawa-Hull Senators	Ottawa, ON & Hull, QC	Lansdowne Park & National Gardens Park	1924
Outremont Canadiens	Outremont, QC / (Montreal, QC)	Atwater Park	1924
Quebec Bulldogs	Quebec, QC	Granby Stadium	1924
Rutland Sheiks	Rutland, Vermont	Unknown	1924

== 1924 Ontario–Quebec–Vermont League overall standings ==
Team standings	W	L	PCT	GB	Managers
Quebec Bulldogs	66	40	.623	–	Mickey Corcoran
Montreal Royals	54	55	.495	13½	Patsy O'Rourke / Whitey Zilenger
Outremont Canadiens	49	58	.458	17½	Pete Farrand
Ottawa–Hull Senators	46	55	.455	17½	Jean Dubuc
Rutland Sheiks	34	20	.630	NA	Punch Daly
Montpelier Goldfish	16	37	.302	NA	Bill McCorry
