= Plattsburgh, New York =

City in New York, United States

Plattsburgh
- City
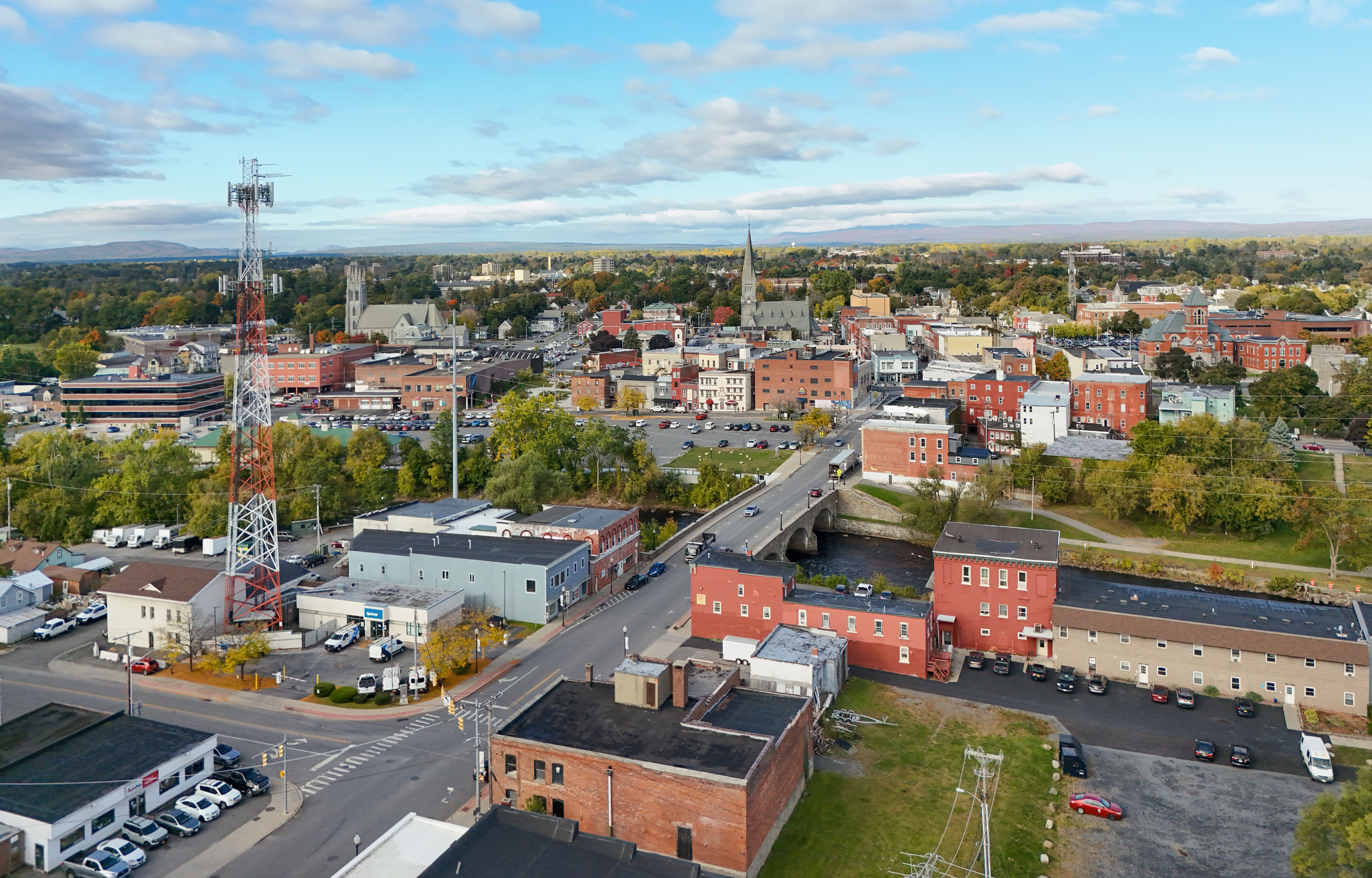
- The skyline in 2024

- Flag Seal
- Nicknames: "The Lake City" "La Ville sur le Lac" "The Burgh"
- Motto: Ipsa Sibi Præmium Virtus (in Latin); Virtue is its own reward
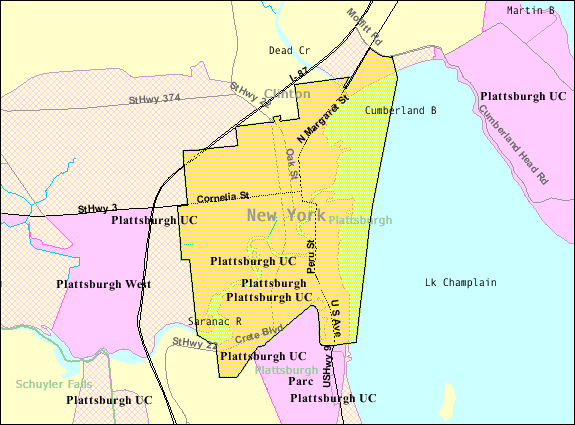
- Map of the city

- Location in Clinton County and the state of New York.
- Coordinates: 44°41′43″N 73°27′30″W
- Country: United States
- State: New York
- Region: The Adirondacks; The North Country
- County: Clinton
- Settled: 1785
- Incorporated: 1815 (village); 1902 (city)
- Named for: Zephaniah Platt

Government
  - Type: Mayor–council
  - Mayor: Wendell Hughes (D)

Area
  - Total: 6.59 sq mi (17.08 km^{2})
  - Land: 5.04 sq mi (13.05 km^{2})
  - Water: 1.56 sq mi (4.03 km^{2}) 23.4%
- Elevation: 138 ft (42 m)

Population (2020)
  - Total: 19,841
  - Density: 3,937.9/sq mi (1,520.42/km^{2})
- Time zone: UTC−5 (Eastern)
  - Summer (DST): UTC−4 (EDT)
- ZIP codes: 12901, 12903
- Area code: 518
- FIPS code: 36-58574
- GNIS feature ID: 0960698
- Website: CityofPlattsburgh-NY.gov

Plattsburgh is a city in and the county seat of Clinton County, New York, United States, situated on the north-western shore of Lake Champlain. The population was 19,841 at the 2020 census. The population of the surrounding (and separately incorporated) Town of Plattsburgh was 11,886 as of the 2020 census, making the combined population of Plattsburgh to be 31,727. Plattsburgh lies just to the northeast of Adirondack Park, immediately outside of the park boundaries. It is the second largest community in the North Country region (after Watertown), and serves as the main commercial hub for the sparsely populated northern Adirondack Mountains. The explorer Samuel de Champlain was the first ever recorded European that sailed into Champlain Valley and later claimed the region as a part of New France in 1609.

Plattsburgh was the site of the amphibious Battle of Plattsburgh in the War of 1812, a key American victory that marked the end of hostilities in the Northern United States. It has been an important military outpost for much of its history, from hosting one of the largest Citizens' Military Training Camps prior to World War I, and Plattsburgh Air Force Base, the east coast center of operations for the Strategic Air Command during much of the Cold War period. The conversion of the base to a civilian airport in the 1990s resulted from the Base Realignment and Closure process during the wind down of the Cold War, and today it serves as a hub for economic development for the region. The city was named one of the Financial Times Top 10 Micro Cities of the Future several times.

== Micropolitan statistical area ==
The city of Plattsburgh is the population center and county seat at the heart of the Plattsburgh micropolitan statistical area (μSA) with a population of 82,128 according to the 2010 Census. A statistical area representing the greater Plattsburgh region (as defined by the U.S. government), the Plattsburgh USA includes all communities in the immediate Clinton County area.

== History ==
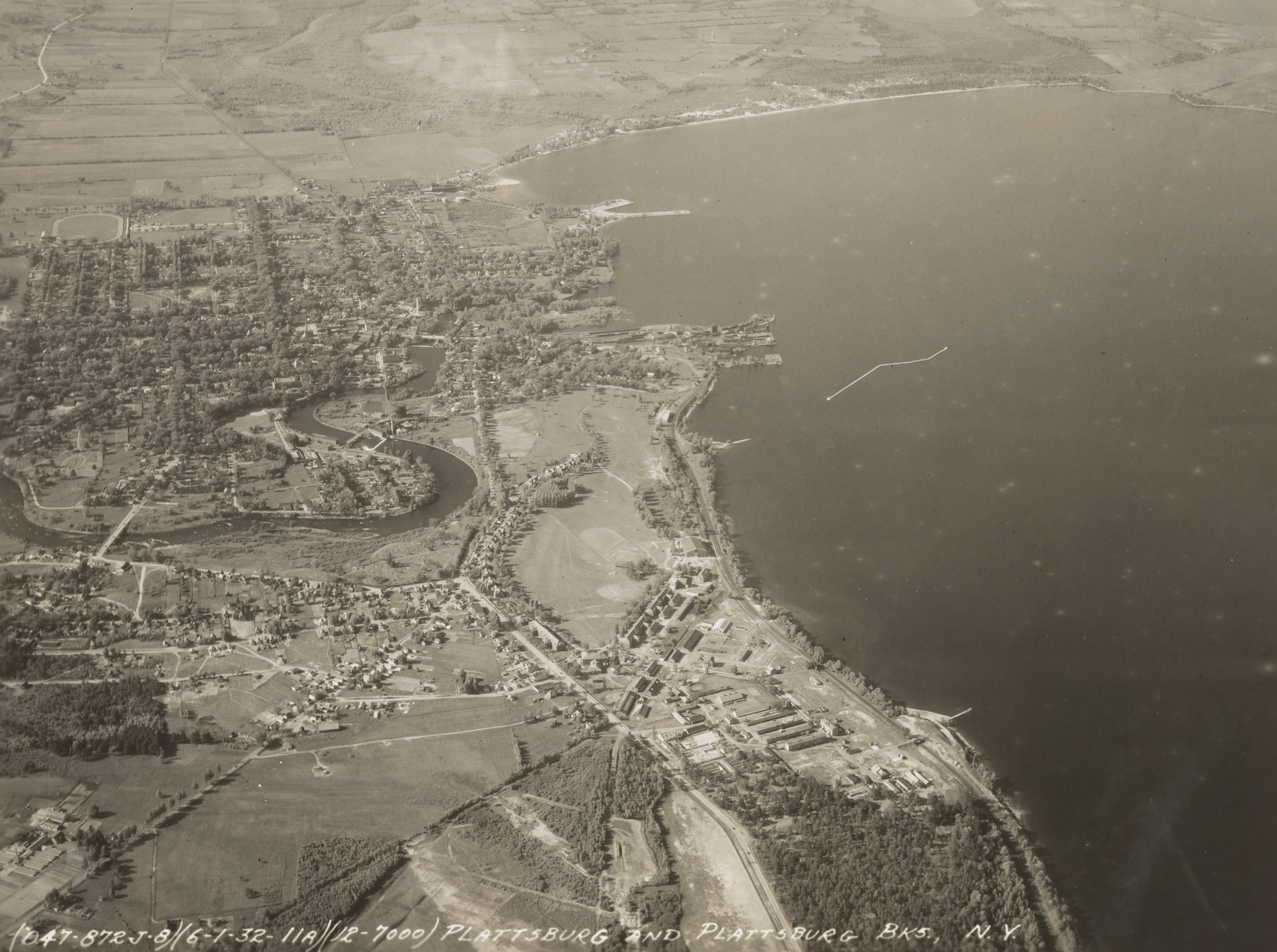
Aerial view of Plattsburgh in July 1932

=== Plattsburgh's founding under American rule ===
Plattsburgh was founded by Zephaniah Platt in 1785 after he was granted the land by George Clinton. Platt, who was from Poughkeepsie, New York, established the new city of Plattsburgh to buffer emerging American interests in the Saint Lawrence River valley and Lake Champlain valley after the American victory in the American Revolutionary War. The centralized American authority proclaimed Plattsburgh in 1785.

=== Split from the Town of Plattsburgh ===
On March 3, 1815, an act was passed by the New York State legislature incorporating the Village of Plattsburgh out of an area that was formerly the eastern part of the town. The first village elections were held on May 2 of that year.

The village incorporated as a city in 1903.

=== Notable historic events ===
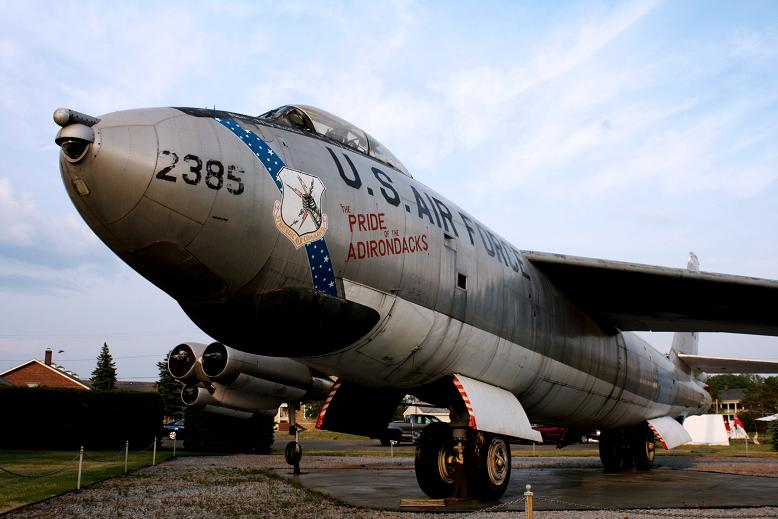
A B-47 bomber with the inscription Pride of the Adirondacks, one of two aircraft on display in the Clyde A. Lewis Air Park.

With its significant location on a major water thoroughfare and proximity to the Canada–U.S. border, Plattsburgh has been the site of a number of historic events including the Revolutionary War's Battle of Valcour Island and the War of 1812's Battle of Plattsburgh; the city has a War of 1812 museum. The Battle of Plattsburgh is significant, as it was the final battle of the war between the British/Canadian forces and those of the Americans.

Plattsburgh Normal School was founded in 1889. It burned in 1929, and relocated to City Hall for three years. In 1932, the college moved into the current Hawkins Hall which became the base of the modern campus. In 1948 it became State University of New York at Plattsburgh.

Plattsburgh was home to minor league baseball. The Plattsburgh Brewers team was based in Plattsburgh between 1895 and 1907. Plattsburgh teams played as members of the Eastern International League (1895), International League (1896), Northern New York League (1901–1905), Independent Northern League (1906), New Hampshire State League (1907) and Vermont State League (1907). Baseball Hall of Fame member Eddie Collins played for Plattsburgh in 1906.

In 1915, the Preparedness Movement established the first and best-known of its training camps for prospective military volunteers at Plattsburgh. The "Plattsburgh camps" trained about 40,000 potential United States Army commissioned officers in the summers of 1915 and 1916.

During the Cold War, military functions took a prominent role in Plattsburgh, which was home to Plattsburgh Air Force Base (PAFB) and was the location of the Strategic Air Command's primary wing on the East Coast due to its geographic desirability. The base's location in the Champlain Valley (protected by the rain shadow of the Adirondack Mountains) ensured consistent, year-round weather that was safe for take-offs and landings. The 380th Bombardment, Aerospace, and Refueling Wings, all stationed at PAFB, included B-52 Bombers, air-refueling "tankers", and FB-111s. The base had a great deal of land surface and was one of only four military bases in the United States with a landing strip large enough for a Space Shuttle landing.

On September 1, 1961, the 556 Strategic Missile Squadron was activated at Plattsburgh AFB. The Squadron consisted of 12 Atlas "F" Intercontinental Ballistic Missiles, stored in underground silos at twelve sites surrounding the city of Plattsburgh. Ten of the silos were in New York, while two were across Lake Champlain in Vermont. The squadron played an active role in the 1962 Cuban Missile crisis, giving President Kennedy a powerful negotiating tool in dealing with Nikita Khrushchev. The 556 SMS's life was relatively short lived since the Atlas was a liquid fuel system that was expensive and difficult to maintain. As the solid fuel Minuteman ICBM began to come on line, the liquid fueled missiles such as the Atlas and Titan were retired. The 556 SMS began inactivating in the spring of 1965, completing that task later that year.

Despite its numerous awards for performance excellence, PAFB was closed on September 29, 1995, in a round of national base closures in the early 1990s as the Air Force began to pare down its post-Cold War missions. The base property is now managed by the Plattsburgh Airbase Redevelopment Corporation (PARC) and is used by a number of industrial manufacturers and commercial airlines.

Plattsburgh remains a favorite tourist location for vacationers from Montreal and southern Quebec. Bilingual signs, in English and French, are found in various parts of the city. Today, the city relies largely in part on new industries with a predominantly Canadian and Québécois influence expanding on the former airbase as well as established manufacturing plants, such as Bombardier, Nova Bus, and others.

== Spelling ==
Plattsburgh is sometimes historically spelled as Plattsburg, leaving off the "h". Many historic documents relating to the famous naval engagement between the United States and Britain in 1814 refer to the Battle of Plattsburg. As a result, some history has been written using the latter spelling. For example, historian and former president of the Society of the War of 1812 in Illinois, John Meloy Stahl, published in 1918 "The Battle of Plattsburg: A Study in and of The War of 1812."

In 1950, the editor of the New York State Legislative Manual, seeking to simplify the organization of that year's manual, requested a listing of state post offices from the United States Postal Service. Upon review of the listing, the difference in spelling was noted. The city was contacted and an investigation was begun by postal authorities.

United States Postal Service records show that the name of the post office was originally Plattsburg but was changed to Plattsburgh by 1828. In 1891, the Postmaster General ordered that post offices follow the standards set by the newly created United States Board on Geographic Names, which decided that the "h" should be dropped from place names ending in "burgh". Subsequently, local postal officials changed the name of the village post office back to Plattsburg. As a result of the 1951 investigation, the name of the city post office was changed back again to Plattsburgh. At no time was the name of the city itself ever changed.

To this day, some signs (including U.S. and Canadian highway signs, and a sign at the Plattsburgh Amtrak Station, among others) point the way to "Plattsburg". There is also a former bank building with plattsburg bank inscribed at the top.

== Geography and climate ==
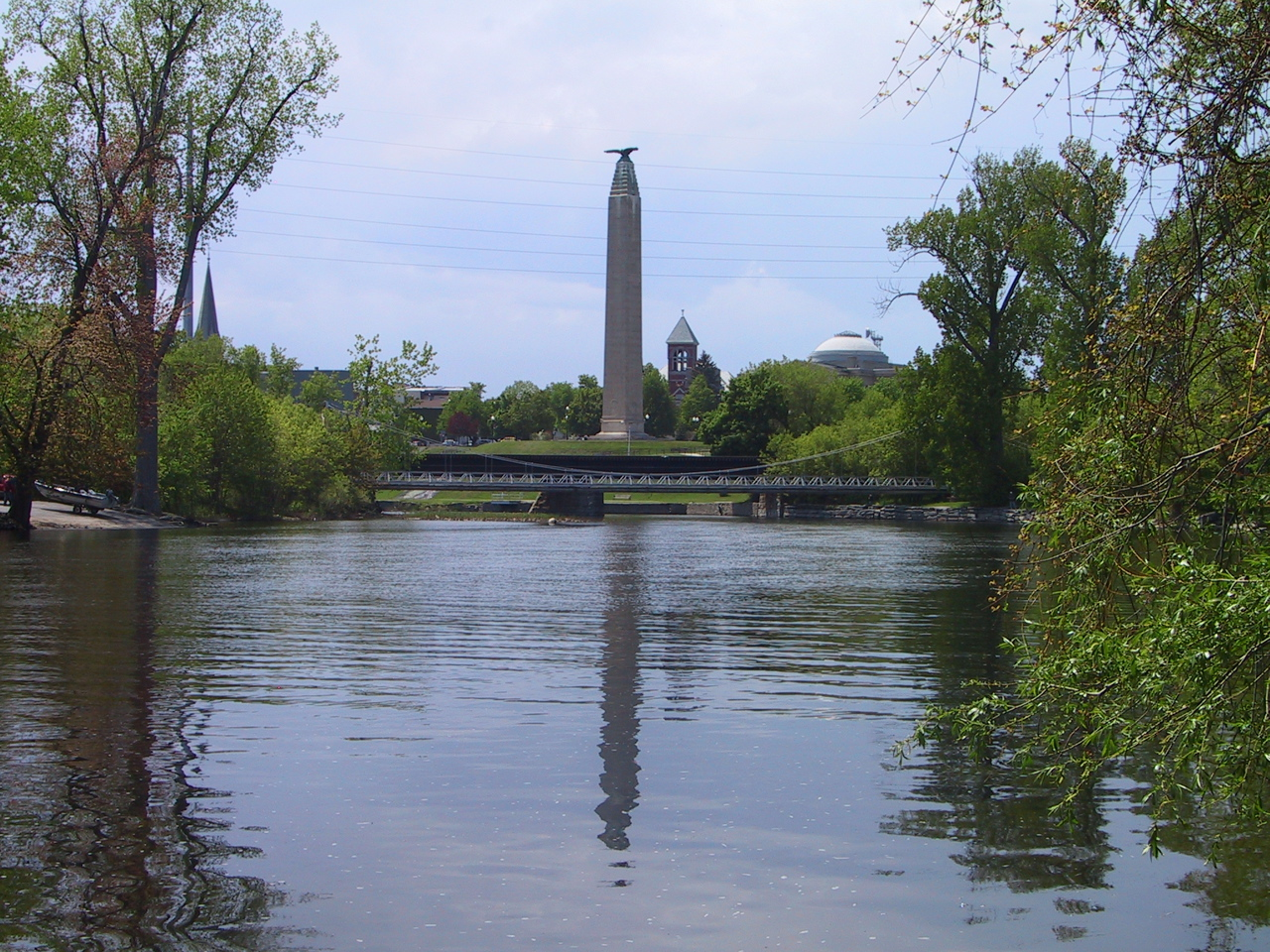
Saranac River flowing through Verdantique Park

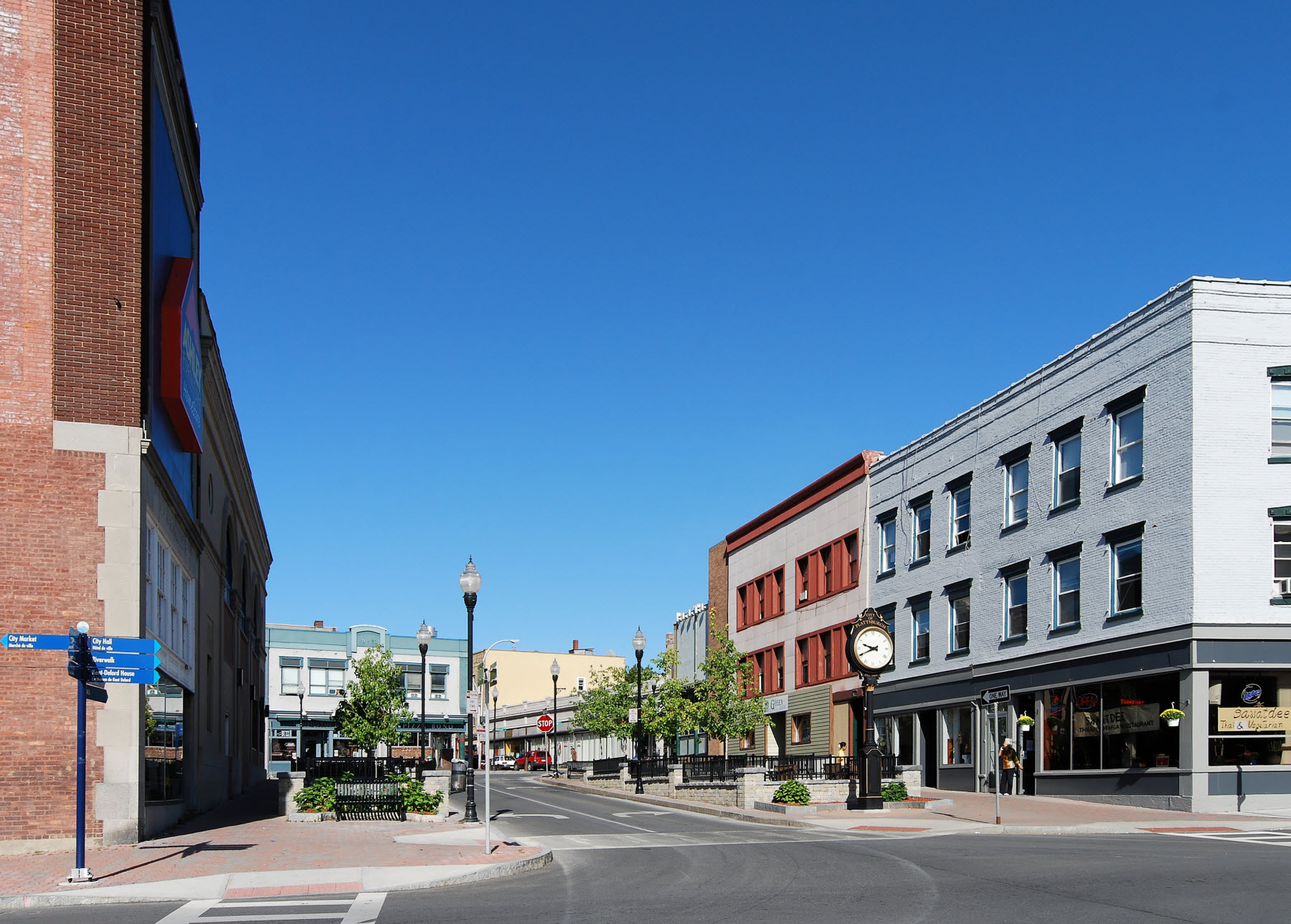
Downtown Plattsburgh

Plattsburgh is at 44°41′43″N 73°27′30″W (44.695365, −73.458593). According to the United States Census Bureau, the city has an area of 6.6 square miles (17.0 km^{2}), of which 5.1 square miles (13.1 km^{2}) is land and 1.5 square miles (4.0 km^{2}) (23.40%) is water.

Plattsburgh is on the western shore of Lake Champlain, in the northeastern part of the state of New York, just south of Cumberland Head.

The Saranac River flows through the city, emptying into Lake Champlain.

=== Climate ===
Plattsburgh is classified as a humid continental climate (Köppen Dfb) with cold, snowy winters and warm, rainy summers.

Climate data for Plattsburgh, New York (1981–2010 normals, extremes 1945–present (Note: Records maintained at Plattsburgh Air Force Base from November 1945 to February 1995, inclusive, Clinton County Airport from July 2, 1998 until April 29, 2007, and at Plattsburgh International Airport since June 18, 2007.))
Month	Jan	Feb	Mar	Apr	May	Jun	Jul	Aug	Sep	Oct	Nov	Dec	Year
Record high °F (°C)	64 (18)	65 (18)	85 (29)	93 (34)	94 (34)	101 (38)	99 (37)	101 (38)	95 (35)	87 (31)	75 (24)	71 (22)	101 (38)
Mean daily maximum °F (°C)	27.4 (−2.6)	30.8 (−0.7)	40.1 (4.5)	53.5 (11.9)	67.5 (19.7)	75.2 (24.0)	80.0 (26.7)	78.5 (25.8)	70.5 (21.4)	57.1 (13.9)	45.8 (7.7)	33.0 (0.6)	55.0 (12.7)
Mean daily minimum °F (°C)	6.4 (−14.2)	10.9 (−11.7)	20.8 (−6.2)	32.4 (0.2)	44.8 (7.1)	53.3 (11.8)	58.5 (14.7)	56.6 (13.7)	48.1 (8.9)	37.6 (3.1)	27.5 (−2.5)	16.2 (−8.8)	34.4 (1.3)
Record low °F (°C)	−34 (−37)	−28 (−33)	−21 (−29)	8 (−13)	25 (−4)	33 (1)	40 (4)	38 (3)	25 (−4)	17 (−8)	−5 (−21)	−21 (−29)	−34 (−37)
Average precipitation inches (mm)	1.85 (47)	1.67 (42)	1.89 (48)	2.57 (65)	2.91 (74)	3.21 (82)	3.31 (84)	3.45 (88)	2.79 (71)	3.46 (88)	2.60 (66)	2.27 (58)	31.98 (813)
Average snowfall inches (cm)	16.8 (43)	13.4 (34)	9.6 (24)	3.0 (7.6)	0 (0)	0 (0)	0 (0)	0 (0)	0 (0)	0.1 (0.25)	4.7 (12)	12.9 (33)	60.5 (154)
Average precipitation days (≥ 0.01 in)	11.9	9.3	10.5	10.7	13.1	11.5	10.5	11.6	10.1	11.2	12.5	10.6	133.5
Average snowy days (≥ 0.1 in)	9.3	7.7	5.8	1.9	0	0	0	0	0	0.1	2.0	6.5	33.3
Source: NOAA (temperature normals at Plattsburgh International Airport, other normals at former Plattsburgh AFB station)

Climate data for Plattsburg, New York (1991–2020 normals, extremes Nov. 1945 – present)
Month	Jan	Feb	Mar	Apr	May	Jun	Jul	Aug	Sep	Oct	Nov	Dec	Year
Record high °F (°C)	64 (18)	65 (18)	85 (29)	93 (34)	94 (34)	101 (38)	99 (37)	101 (38)	95 (35)	87 (31)	75 (24)	71 (22)	101 (38)
Mean maximum °F (°C)	48 (9)	48 (9)	61 (16)	76 (24)	85 (29)	91 (33)	92 (33)	90 (32)	86 (30)	75 (24)	64 (18)	52 (11)	93 (34)
Mean daily maximum °F (°C)	28.2 (−2.1)	31.0 (−0.6)	40.0 (4.4)	54.0 (12.2)	67.7 (19.8)	75.4 (24.1)	80.7 (27.1)	78.9 (26.1)	70.7 (21.5)	57.6 (14.2)	45.7 (7.6)	34.1 (1.2)	55.3 (13.0)
Daily mean °F (°C)	19.1 (−7.2)	21.0 (−6.1)	30.2 (−1.0)	43.5 (6.4)	56.0 (13.3)	64.4 (18.0)	69.9 (21.1)	67.7 (19.8)	59.7 (15.4)	48.0 (8.9)	37.2 (2.9)	26.4 (−3.1)	45.3 (7.4)
Mean daily minimum °F (°C)	10.0 (−12.2)	11.0 (−11.7)	20.5 (−6.4)	33.0 (0.6)	44.4 (6.9)	53.4 (11.9)	59.1 (15.1)	56.5 (13.6)	48.7 (9.3)	38.4 (3.6)	28.8 (−1.8)	18.6 (−7.4)	35.2 (1.8)
Mean minimum °F (°C)	−14 (−26)	−12 (−24)	0 (−18)	20 (−7)	31 (−1)	41 (5)	48 (9)	45 (7)	34 (1)	25 (−4)	13 (−11)	−6 (−21)	−17 (−27)
Record low °F (°C)	−34 (−37)	−28 (−33)	−21 (−29)	8 (−13)	25 (−4)	33 (1)	40 (4)	38 (3)	25 (−4)	17 (−8)	−5 (−21)	−21 (−29)	−34 (−37)
Average precipitation inches (mm)	1.41 (36)	1.22 (31)	1.33 (34)	2.55 (65)	2.88 (73)	4.07 (103)	3.61 (92)	3.58 (91)	3.11 (79)	3.04 (77)	2.33 (59)	1.76 (45)	30.89 (785)
Average precipitation days (≥ 0.01 in)	10	9	11	12	14	14	13	13	12	13	12	11	146
Source: NOAA

== Demographics ==
Historical population
Census	Pop.	Note	%±
1860	3,032		—
1870	5,139		69.5%
1880	5,245		2.1%
1890	7,010		33.7%
1900	8,434		20.3%
1910	11,138		32.1%
1920	10,909		−2.1%
1930	13,349		22.4%
1940	16,351		22.5%
1950	17,738		8.5%
1960	20,172		13.7%
1970	18,715		−7.2%
1980	21,057		12.5%
1990	21,255		0.9%
2000	18,816		−11.5%
2010	19,989		6.2%
2020	19,841		−0.7%
U.S. Decennial Census

=== 2020 census ===
As of the 2020 census, Plattsburgh had a population of 19,841. The median age was 34.6 years. 14.4% of residents were under the age of 18 and 18.1% of residents were 65 years of age or older. For every 100 females there were 89.0 males, and for every 100 females age 18 and over there were 86.9 males age 18 and over.

100.0% of residents lived in urban areas, while 0.0% lived in rural areas.

There were 8,719 households in Plattsburgh, of which 19.2% had children under the age of 18 living in them. Of all households, 26.0% were married-couple households, 27.1% were households with a male householder and no spouse or partner present, and 35.5% were households with a female householder and no spouse or partner present. About 45.0% of all households were made up of individuals and 15.2% had someone living alone who was 65 years of age or older.

There were 9,487 housing units, of which 8.1% were vacant. The homeowner vacancy rate was 1.3% and the rental vacancy rate was 5.9%.

Racial composition as of the 2020 census
Race	Number	Percent
White	16,289	82.1%
Black or African American	1,123	5.7%
American Indian and Alaska Native	77	0.4%
Asian	553	2.8%
Native Hawaiian and Other Pacific Islander	11	0.1%
Some other race	445	2.2%
Two or more races	1,343	6.8%
Hispanic or Latino (of any race)	1,107	5.6%

=== 2010 census ===
As of the 2010 census, there were 19,989 people, 7,600 households, and 3,473 families residing in the city.

The population density was 3,919.4 inhabitants per square mile (1,513.3/km^{2}). There were 8,691 housing units at an average density of 1,704.1 per square mile (658.0/km^{2}). The racial makeup of the city was 89.88% White, 3.5% Black or African American, 0.38% Native American, 2.77% Asian, 0.03% Pacific Islander, 1.03% from other races, and 2.41% from two or more races. Hispanic or Latino of any race were 3.4% of the population.

There were 7,600 households, out of which 22.3% had children under the age of 18 living with them, 31.1% were married couples living together, 11.4% had a female householder with no husband present, and 54.3% were non-families. 40.4% of all households were made up of individuals, and 13.5% had someone living alone who was 65 years of age or older. The average household size was 2.10 and the average family size was 2.83.

In the city, the population was spread out, with 16.5% under the age of 18, 27.7% from 18 to 24, 23.5% from 25 to 44, 18.1% from 45 to 64, and 14.1% who were 65 years of age or older. The median age was 30 years. For every 100 females, there were 86.4 males. For every 100 females age 18 and over, there were 83.7 males.

The median income for a household in the city was $28,846, and the median income for a family was $46,337. Males had a median income of $35,429 versus $26,824 for females. The per capita income for the city was $17,127. About 13.6% of families and 23.1% of the population were below the poverty line, including 20.0% of those under age 18 and 13.0% of those age 65 or over.

== Government ==
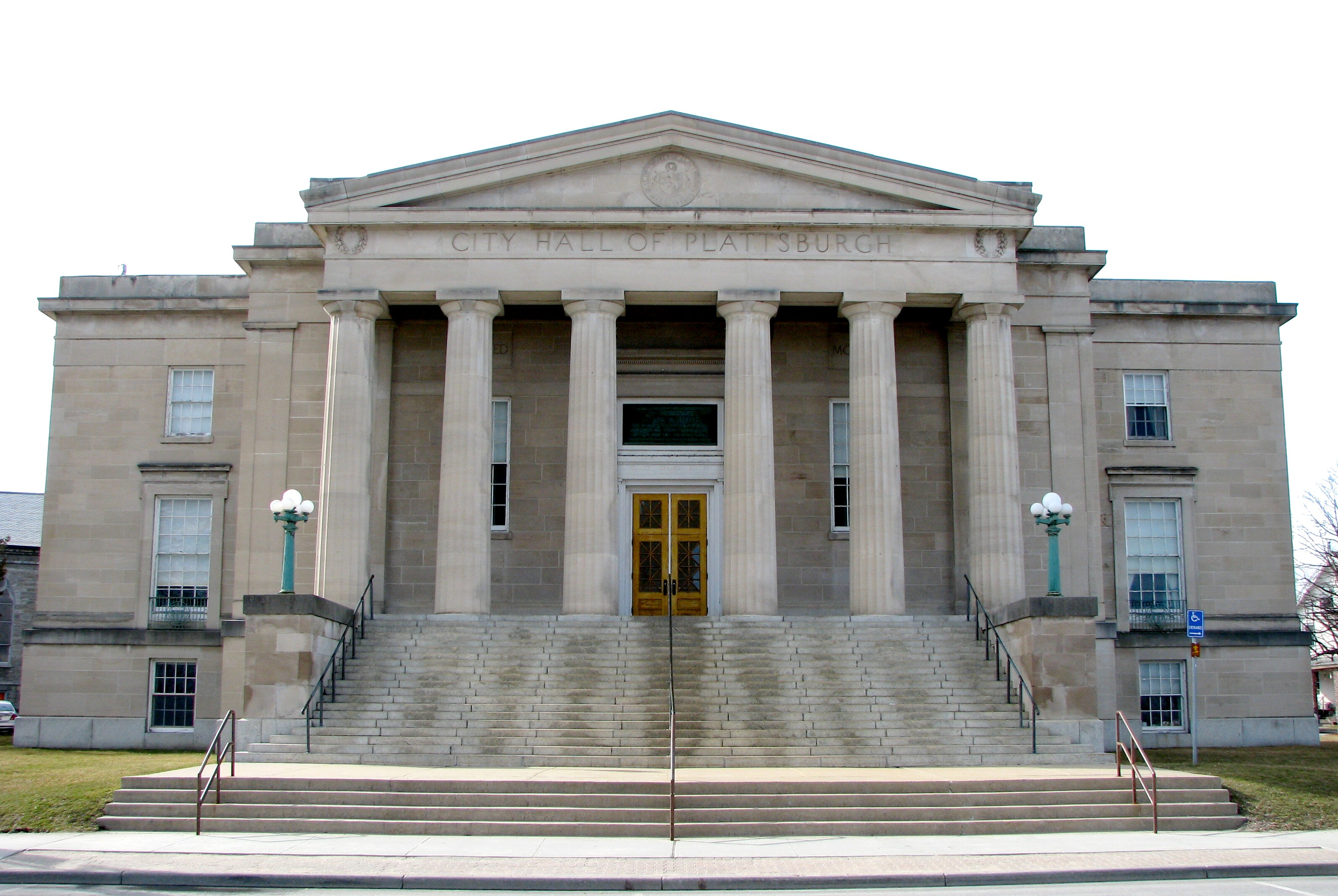
Plattsburgh City Hall

The government is headed by a mayor elected by a citywide vote and a council of six members, one elected from each ward. Wendel Hughes, a Democrat, is the current mayor of the city of Plattsburgh. He assumed office on January 1, 2025.

== Education ==
The city is home to SUNY Plattsburgh, a public university which is a part of the State University of New York (SUNY) system, and Clinton Community College, which is also part of the SUNY System. SUNY Plattsburgh has been a part of the city since its founding in 1889 as the Plattsburgh State Normal School. Today, the college is host to about 5,500 undergraduates, 400 graduate students, and almost 400 faculty members.

Students at the K–12 level who attend public schools in the city are served by the Plattsburgh City School District, which educates 2,000 students in five different schools.

== Media ==
=== Newspapers ===
Plattsburgh has three commercial newspapers:

- The Clinton County Free Trader Today has a circulation of slightly over 15,000. (It merged with the North Countryman in 2010.)
- The Plattsburgh Press Republican has a slightly more than 17,000 circulation.
- Plattsburgh Burgh has a reported circulation of 8,000.

=== Television ===
Plattsburgh has two television stations, WCFE-TV, channel 57, a PBS member station and WPTZ, channel 5, an NBC affiliate, though WPTZ moved their main offices to Burlington in 2019, leaving Plattsburgh as a small regional satellite bureau. Plattsburgh is part of a media market shared with Burlington, Vermont, which includes WCAX-TV (CBS, channel 3), WVNY-TV (ABC, channel 22), WNNE (CW, channel 31) and WFFF-TV (Fox, channel 44). Residents are also in the range of Montreal, Quebec, and other Canadian television stations. Some of these Canadian stations, including CBFT-DT, CBMT-DT and CFCF-DT, are available on Charter Communications, the cable franchise serving Plattsburgh.

== Transportation ==
The city is about a 60-minute drive from Montreal, Canada's second most populous city, which is also the largest city in Quebec. Many people commute across the Canada–U.S. border, and the City of Plattsburgh advertises itself as "Montreal's U.S. suburb". New York state is Quebec's largest trade partner, with about $6 billion in trade annually. The proximity leads to Plattsburgh's prominence as a large trade center for a city its size.

=== Highway ===
- Interstate 87 bypasses Plattsburgh to the west, connecting Montreal with Albany and points south. Three main exits serve the city of Plattsburgh, with a fourth serving the Cumberland Head district of the town.
- U.S. Route 9 is a north–south highway crossing through the city on the east side.
- New York State Route 3 is an east–west state highway that enters the city from the west as Cornelia Street, intersects Route 22 and then ends at Route 9.
- New York State Route 22 is a north–south state highway that enters the city from the southwest, then turns north to run parallel to the west of Route 9. Part of Route 22 in downtown is a divided highway.
- New York State Route 314 is a short east–west highway on the northern town line with the town of Plattsburgh connecting Interstate 87 with the Grand Isle–Plattsburgh Ferry to Vermont.

=== Rail ===
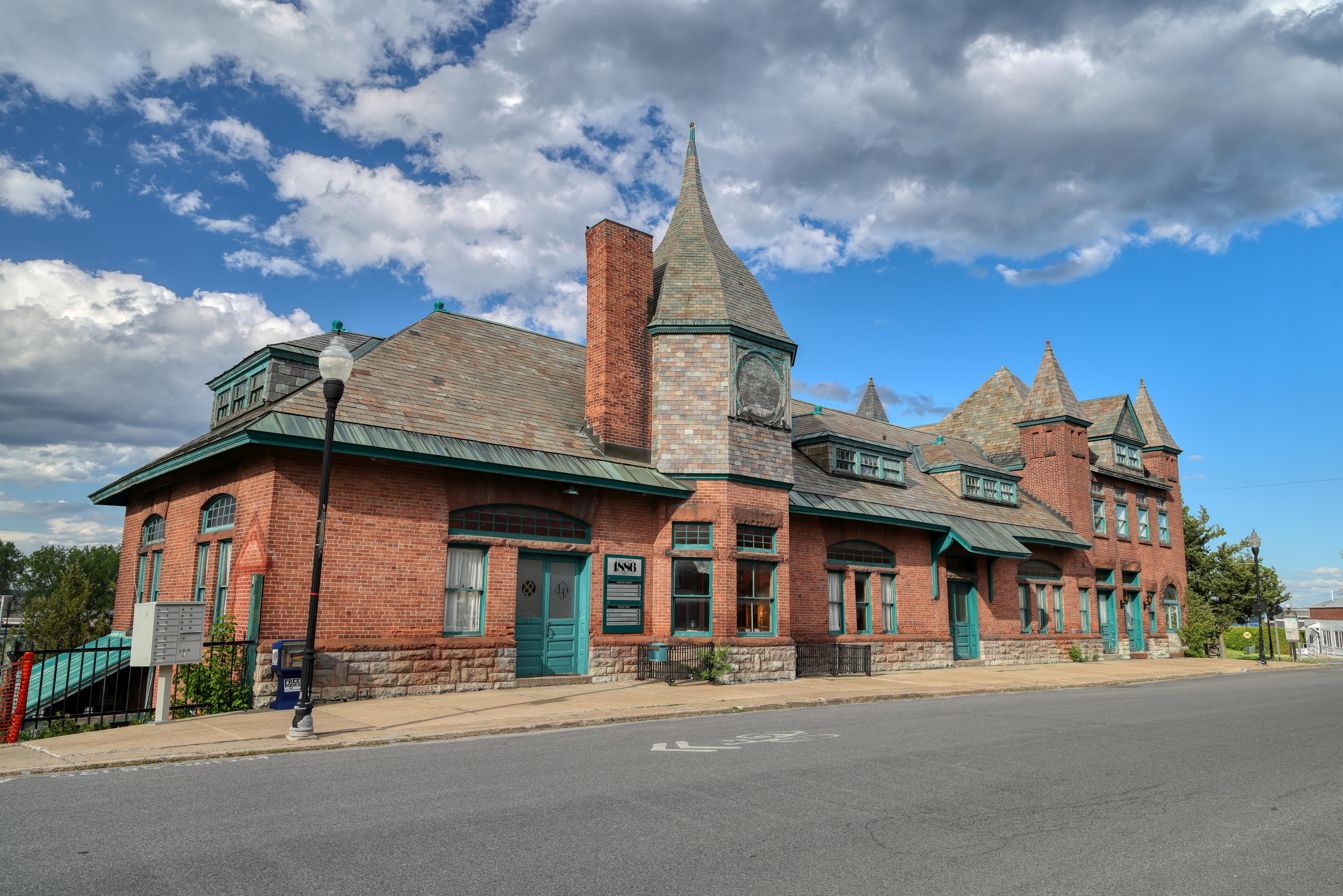
Plattsburgh train station

Amtrak, the national passenger rail system, provides service to Plattsburgh, operating its Adirondack daily in both directions between Montreal and New York City.

=== Ferry ===
The closest American city larger than Plattsburgh is Burlington, Vermont, which is reachable by a ferry or a bridge located further north at Rouses Point. Ferry service is provided at Cumberland Head, and heads to Grand Isle by the Lake Champlain Transportation Company. The seasonal ferry between Port Kent and Burlington has ceased operations and is unlikely to reopen.

=== Air ===
Plattsburgh International Airport uses the runway of the former Plattsburgh Air Force Base, which closed in 1995. The airport terminal was completed in February 2007 with the building being dedicated on April 27, 2007.

Plattsburgh flight demand is driven by the increased traffic from Montreal, Quebec. At approximately 80% to 85% of total yearly demand, Plattsburgh's airport markets itself as Montreal's American Airport, given it is closer to Montreal's South Shore Residents than Montreal-Pierre Elliott Trudeau International Airport, even with a 10 (workdays/Canadian side) to 20-minute (weekend/Canadian side) average border wait time.

=== Bus ===
The city is serviced by the Clinton County Public Transportation (CCPT for short). The county-wide bus service offers passengers city and county-wide bus routes, allowing passengers from surrounding communities to travel to and from Plattsburgh. These routes operate five days a week, with a city-wide shopping shuttle offered on Saturdays. There is no bus service on Sundays or major holidays.

The North Country Express (NCE for short) runs every day between Plattsburgh and Potsdam, and every day except Sunday between Plattsburgh and Malone making several stops in between. There is no service on major holidays.

For those going longer distances, Greyhound and Adirondack Trailways offers multiple daily trips towards Montreal and Albany.

== Economy ==
The largest employers in Clinton County are C.V.P.H. Medical Center, SUNY Plattsburgh, Clinton County Government, Wal-Mart, Sam's Club, Advocacy and Resource Center, City of Plattsburgh, and Swarovski Lighting. SUNY Plattsburgh contributes approximately $300 million to the regional economy each fiscal year.

Other large companies in the area include: ALSTOM Transportation, which builds rail-cars in a 219,000 sq ft (20,300 m^{2}) plant; Norsk Titanium, which opened its U.S. branch in Plattsburgh to make parts for the aerospace industry through the use of titanium rapid plasma deposition; and Nova Bus and Prevost which manufactures busses for the American market.

== Notable people ==
- Michael P. Anderson, one of the seven astronauts who died in the Space Shuttle Columbia disaster, was born in Plattsburgh and lived there until the age of one. He later was stationed at Plattsburgh Air Force Base while in the service.
- Jean Arthur (1900–1991), comedy actress of the 1930s and 1940s and the star of her own CBS television series in 1966, The Jean Arthur Show.
- Rockwell Blake, world-renowned operatic tenor and first recipient of the Richard Tucker Award, known for his roles in the Bel Canto operas, was born in Plattsburgh.
- Jesse Boulerice, retired NHL hockey player, was born in Plattsburgh.
- Thomas John Carlisle, poet
- Tom Chapin, Grammy Award–winning singer-songwriter, graduated State University of New York at Plattsburgh.
- Lucretia Davidson (1808–1825), renowned poet whose work before her death by tuberculosis at the age of 16 received accolades and the praise of prominent contemporaries such as Edgar Allan Poe, Robert Southey, and Catharine Sedgwick. The epitaph on Davidson's headstone in Plattsburgh's Riverside Cemetery is a poem drafted by William Cullen Bryant, titled "The Death of the Flowers".
- Eric Harris (1981–1999), one of the gunmen who committed the Columbine High School massacre in Columbine, Colorado on April 20, 1999 before taking his own life
- John Henry Hopkins Jr., author of the well-known Christmas carol "We Three Kings", was rector of Plattsburgh's Trinity Episcopal church from 1872 to 1876.
- Tom Lecky, antiquarian bookseller, musician, artist
- Stephen Moffitt (1837–1904), military officer and politician
- John White Moore, rear admiral of the United States Navy, noted for his service in the American Civil War and the Spanish–American War.
- Bryan O'Byrne, character actor, was born in Plattsburgh, attended St. Peter's Elementary School, Plattsburgh High School, and graduated from Plattsburgh State.
- Roman Phifer, former NFL linebacker
- Lewis W. Pierce (1810–1882), member of the New York State Assembly
- Zephaniah C. Platt (1805–1884), farmer, banker, and politician
- Henry A. Reed (1844–1930), US Army brigadier general, born in Plattsburgh
- Clara Senecal (1865-1944), became first female sheriff in the State of New York in 1926.
- David Allen Sibley, author and ornithologist
- David A. Stafford, brigadier general in the United States Marine Corps
- Daniel Stewart, first openly gay elected mayor in NY state history. In office 2000–2006.
- Roy Stone, brigadier general in the United States Army, noted for his participation in the Battle of Gettysburg
- Rick Tuttle, Freedom Rider and Los Angeles City Controller.
- Karen Elizabeth Wetterhahn (1948–1997) was an American professor of chemistry at Dartmouth College who specialized in toxic metal exposure. She died of mercury poisoning at the age of 48 due to accidental exposure to the organic mercury compound dimethylmercury (Hg(CH_{3})_{2}). In response, the Occupational Safety and Health Administration recommended that the use of dimethylmercury be avoided unless absolutely necessary and mandated the use of plastic-laminate gloves (SilverShield) when handling this compound.
- John Lloyd Young, Tony Award winner who played Frankie Valli in the original Broadway cast of Jersey Boys, Clint Eastwood's eponymous film based on the play, and Member of the President's Committee on the Arts and Humanities (appointed by Barack Obama) graduated from Plattsburgh High School in 1993.

== In popular culture ==
=== Books ===
- Russell Banks's coming-of-age novel Rule of the Bone (1995) features a young criminal named Chappie, whose hometown is Plattsburgh.
- The opening sentence of the book Alcoholics Anonymous refers to Plattsburgh. "War fever ran high in the New England town to which we new, young officers from Plattsburgh were assigned."

=== Films ===
- The crime film Frozen River (2008) was filmed in Plattsburgh and surrounding areas.
- A scene from the Joe Cocker documentary Mad Dogs & Englishmen was filmed in and around his April 7, 1970, concert at SUNY Plattsburgh.
- Some scenes from the film Escape at Dannemora were shot in the city of Plattsburgh.

=== Music ===
- Peter Frampton performed and was recorded for some tracks of the best-selling album Frampton Comes Alive! on the campus of SUNY Plattsburgh on November 22, 1975. This Student Association-sponsored concert was held at Memorial Hall.
- In August 1996, the rock band Phish, which was based across Lake Champlain in Burlington, Vermont, held the first of its ten weekend-long festivals at the former Plattsburgh Air Force Base. The festival, called The Clifford Ball, attracted 70,000 fans from all over the country, making it Phish's largest concert up to that point and the largest rock concert in the U.S. in that year, and featured seven sets of music by the band.
- In September 2011, the British-Irish band One Direction filmed part of their music video "Gotta Be You" on the SUNY Plattsburgh campus.

=== Television ===
- In the Mad Men season 5 episode "Far Away Places", Don and Megan Draper purportedly visit Howard Johnson's Restaurant and Motor Lodge in Plattsburgh, but the exteriors were actually shot in Baldwin Park, California.
- In the Law & Order: SVU season 8 episode "Scheherazade" Benson and Stabler go to Plattsburgh to question a dying criminal about his involvement with an unsolved bank robbery. The dialogue suggests that Plattsburgh is just a short drive away, when in reality Plattsburgh is about a five-hour drive from NYC.
