= New Hampshire State League =

U.S. State Minor League Baseball League

- Classification: Independent (1885, 1886, 1895); Class D (1907)
- Sport: Minor League Baseball
- First season: 1885
- Folded: June 29, 1907
- Replaced by: Vermont State League
- President: Unknown
- No. of teams: 8
- Country: United States of America
- Most titles: 1 Barre-Montpelier Intercities (1907)

The New Hampshire State League was a Class D level minor league baseball league that played in the 1907 season. The eight–team New Hampshire State League consisted of teams based in New Hampshire, New York and Vermont. The league first played as an Independent league in the 1885, 1886 and 1895 seasons. The New Hampshire State League changed names to become the four–team Independent Vermont State League during the 1907 season.

== History ==
Prior to the Class D level league of 1907, the New Hampshire State League played in the 1885, 1886 and 1895 seasons as an Independent level league. The 1886 New Hampshire League featured teams based in the New Hampshire cities of Concord, Manchester (three teams, including West Manchester, "Amoskeag"), and Nashua. The league standings and records for the three seasons are unknown.

The New Hampshire State League began play in the 1907 season as a Class D level league. It was an eight–team league that began play on May 11, 1907. During the 1907 season, the New Hampshire State League folded four teams. A meeting was held on June 17, 1907, where the league was restructured and changed its name to the Vermont State League, beginning play July 2, 1907.

The standings for the New Hampshire State League were affected by four franchises who did not play the complete season. The standings through June 29, 1907, were led by the Barre-Montpelier Intercities with a record of 19–6, followed by the Burlington Burlingtons (13–12), West Manchester (11–12) and Laconia/Plattsburgh Brewers (8–14). The teams from East Manchester (7–7), Franklin (5–7), Nashua (3–3) and Concord (2–7) folded during the season.

The Vermont State League continued play as an Independent four–team league beginning, July 2, 1907. Rutland, Vermont joined the Barre-Montpelier Intercities, Burlington Burlingtons and Plattsburgh Brewers in the Vermont State League. The final standings of the 1907 Vermont State League were Barre-Montpelier Intercities 12–4, Burlington Burlingtons 6–5, Rutland 5–8 and the Plattsburgh Brewers 5–11.

== New Hampshire State League Teams ==
Team name	City represented	Ballpark	Year active
Barre-Montpelier Intercities	Barre, Vermont & Montpelier, Vermont	Barre Base Ball Grounds	1907
Burlington Burlingtons	Burlington, Vermont	Centennial Field	1907
Concord	Concord, New Hampshire	Unknown	1907
East Manchester	Manchester, New Hampshire	Varick Park	1907
Franklin	Franklin, New Hampshire	Unknown	1907
Laconia/Plattsburgh Brewers	Laconia, New Hampshire & Plattsburgh, New York	Clinton Park	1907
Nashua	Nashua, New Hampshire	Unknown	1907
Rutland	Rutland, Vermont	Unknown	1907
West Manchester	Manchester, New Hampshire	Varick Park	1907

== 1907 New Hampshire State League overall standings ==
Team standings	W	L	PCT	GB	Managers
Barre-Montpelier Intercities	19	6	.760	–	A.W. Daley
Burlington Burlingtons	13	12	.520	5½	John Leighton; Tom Hays /T.K. Milne
West Manchester	11	12	.478	6½	James MacDonald
Laconia/Plattsburgh Brewers	8	14	.364	7½	W. Van Duzen
East Manchester	7	7	.500	NA	John O'Connor
Franklin	5	7	.325	NA	Barney McLaughlin and O'Brien
Nashua	3	3	.500	NA	Harry Nevers
Concord	2	7	.297	NA	A. Long
