= Jean Dubuc =

American baseball player (1888–1958)

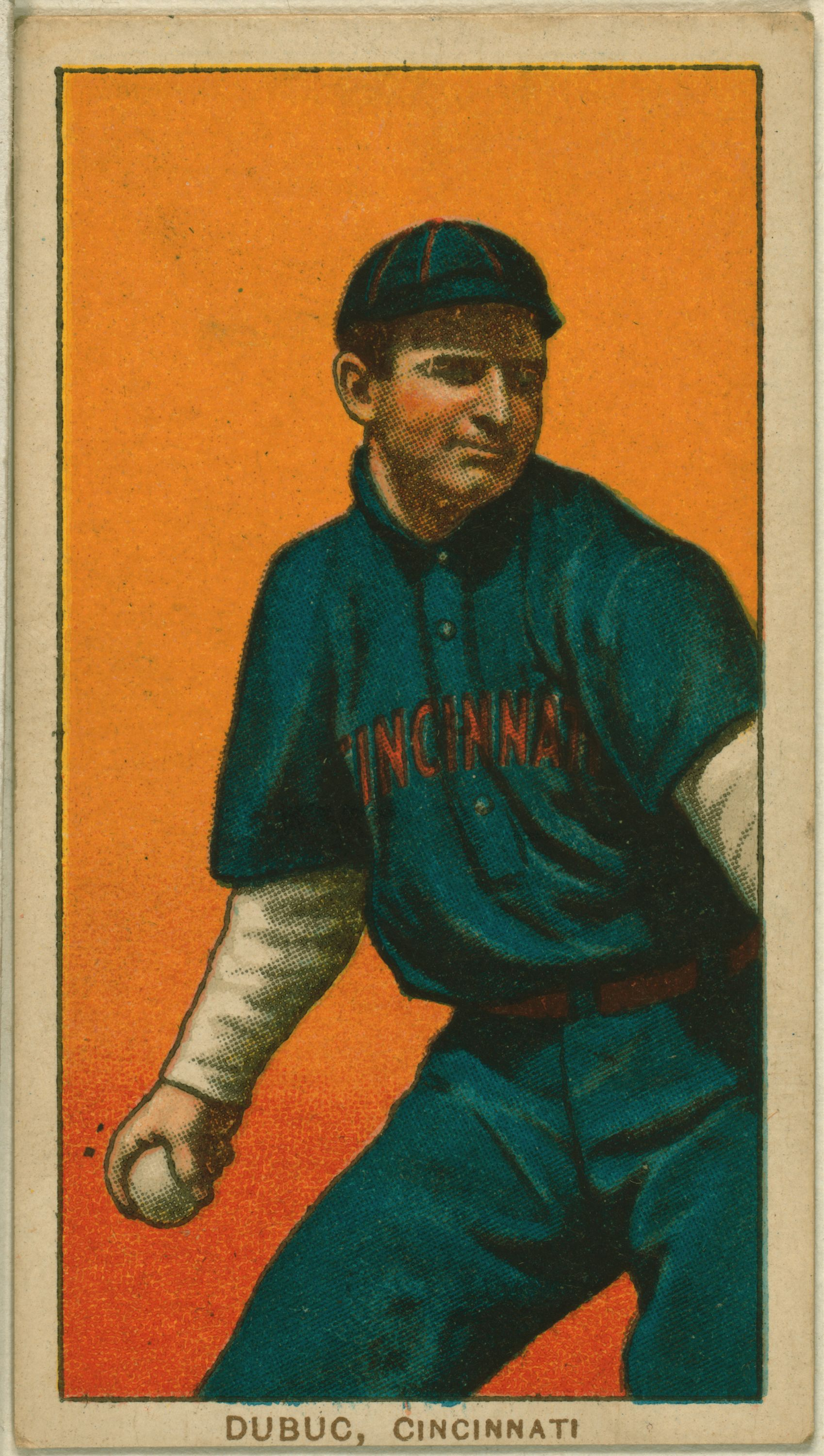
- Dubuc on a T206 baseball card
- Pitcher
- Born: September 15, 1888; St. Johnsbury, Vermont, U.S.
- Died: August 28, 1958 (aged 69); Fort Myers, Florida, U.S.
- Batted: Right Threw: Right

MLB debut
- June 25, 1908, for the Cincinnati Reds

Last MLB appearance
- September 26, 1919, for the New York Giants

MLB statistics
- Win–loss record: 84–76
- Earned run average: 3.04
- Strikeouts: 438
- Stats at Baseball Reference

Teams
- Cincinnati Reds (1908–1909); Detroit Tigers (1912–1916); Boston Red Sox (1918); New York Giants (1919)

Career highlights and awards
- World Series champion (1918)

Jean Joseph Octave Dubuc (September 15, 1888 – August 28, 1958), sometimes known by the nickname "Chauncey", was an American right-handed baseball pitcher, manager, and scout, and a coach of both baseball and ice hockey.

A native of Vermont, Dubuc played professional baseball for 17 years between 1908 and 1926, including nine seasons in Major League Baseball with the Cincinnati Reds (1908–1909), Detroit Tigers (1912–1916), Boston Red Sox (1918), and New York Giants (1919). During his major league career, he had an 85–76 win–loss record with a 3.04 earned run average (ERA). His best season was 1912 when he compiled a 17–10 record with a 2.77 ERA.

Dubuc was an above average hitting pitcher in his major league career, posting a .230 batting average (150-for-652) with 57 runs, 23 doubles, 10 triples, 4 home runs, 58 RBI and drawing 30 bases on balls. He was used as a pinch hitter 109 times and also played five games in the outfield.

During the investigation of the Black Sox Scandal, he was implicated for having "guilty knowledge" of the fix. He later served as the coach of the Brown University baseball team in the 1920s and worked as a scout for the Detroit Tigers in the late 1920s and 1930. He was responsible for signing Birdie Tebbetts and Hank Greenberg.

== Early years ==
Dubuc was born in St. Johnsbury, Vermont, in 1888. He attended Saint Michael's College in Vermont as a member of the high school class of 1906. While attending Saint Michael's, he played three sports, compiled a 23–1 record in two years as a pitcher for the baseball team, and threw a no-hitter against the University of Vermont baseball team in 1906. He was inducted into the Saint Michael's Athletics Hall of Fame in 2006.

== Notre Dame ==
Dubuc enrolled at the University of Notre Dame in the fall of 1906 and played both baseball and basketball for the Notre Dame Fighting Irish. As a freshman in the spring of 1907, he compiled a 5–1 record as a pitcher. In his only loss in 1907, Dubuc threw a one-hitter and struck out 16 batters but Notre Dame lost to Minnesota, 2–1. In 1908, his record improved to 8–1, his only loss coming against the University of Vermont.

On June 7, 1908, Dubuc and the Notre Dame catcher, Ray Scanlan, appeared in a semipro baseball game for the "White Rocks" at Gunther Park in Chicago. Dubuc appeared under the name Williams, but he was recognized by fans present at the game. Despite the presence of the Notre Dame battery, the White Rocks lost by a 2–1 score. The Notre Dame athletic board of control charged Dubuc and Scanlan with professionalism, and they denied having played in the game and requested time to gather evidence in their defense. Dubuc was ultimately found to have appeared in the game, and his college eligibility was removed.

== Professional baseball player ==
=== Cincinnati Reds ===
Within days after losing his college eligibility, Dubuc signed with the Cincinnati Reds. On June 25, 1908, Dubuc made his major league debut for the Reds. He gave up five earned runs in 3 1/3 innings and, adding injury to insult, sustained a knee injury and had to be carried off the field. He returned to the mound as a relief pitcher two weeks later on July 12 and allowed only one hit in four innings. He also pitched a complete-game shutout over the 1908 World Series champion Chicago Cubs team on September 7, 1908. In all, Dubuc appeared in 15 games for the 1908 Reds, nine as a starter, and compiled a 5–6 record and a 2.74 ERA. He also traveled with the Reds to Cuba after the 1908 season and won three of four exhibitions games he started on that trip.

In 1909, Dubuc was slowed after contracting malaria. He appeared in 11 games for the 1909 Reds, two as a starter, and compiled a 2–5 record with a 3.66 ERA.

=== Buffalo and Montreal ===
On November 3, 1909, the Reds sold Dubuc to the Buffalo Bisons of the Eastern League. He was then acquired by the Montreal Royals where he remained through the 1911 season. He compiled a 21–11 record with Montreal in 1911.

=== Detroit Tigers ===
On September 1, 1911, after Dubuc's strong performance during the 1911 season, the Detroit Tigers selected Dubuc in the Major League Baseball draft. Dubuc signed with the Tigers in January 1912 after some wrangling over salary with Tigers owner Frank Navin. Dubuc became part of the Tigers' starting rotation for five consecutive years from 1912 to 1916. In five seasons with Detroit, Dubuc was 72–60 with 90 complete games.

In 1912, Dubuc appeared in 37 games, 26 as a starter, and compiled a 17–10 record with a 2.77 ERA and a .269 batting average. He ranked among the American League leaders with a .630 winning percentage (eighth), and 23 complete games (ninth). However, lack of control also placed him among the league leaders with 16 wild pitches (first) and 109 bases on balls (second).

In 1913, he had another strong year, appearing in 36 games, 28 as a starter, and compiling a 15–14 record with a 2.89 ERA. He was arguably the best fielding pitcher in the American League in 1913 with a 4.56 range factor per nine innings pitched (best in the American League), 107 assists (second in the league among pitchers) and 16 putouts (third in the league). He also led the league for the second consecutive year in wild pitches with 13 and ranked fourth with 91 bases on balls.

He remained with the Tigers for another three years, going 12–14 with a 3.46 ERA in 1914, 17–12 with a 3.21 ERA in 1915, and 10–10 with a 2.96 ERA in 1916.

=== Salt Lake City ===
On January 16, 1917, the Tigers released Dubuc to the Salt Lake City Bees of the Pacific Coast League. He compiled a 22–16 record a in 1917 and a 3.18 ERA in 42 games for Salt Lake in 1917. The following year, he went 9–9 with a 3.60 ERA in 19 games for Salt Lake. He also played in the outfield for Salt Lake in 1918 with a .303 batting average.

=== Boston and New York ===
In late July 1918, he signed with the Boston Red Sox. He appeared in only two games for the Red Sox, compiling an 0–1 record with a 4.22 ERA.

On April 7, 1919, the Red Sox returned Dubuc to Salt Lake. Two weeks later, on April 23, the New York Giants bought Dubuc from Salt Lake. He appeared in 36 games, 33 as a relief pitcher, for the 1919 Giants and compiled a 6–4 record with a career low 2.66 ERA. Despite the strong performance, Dubuc was released by John McGraw of the Giants after the 1919 season. McGraw later stated publicly that he released Dubuc because he "constantly associated" with Sleepy Bill Burns, a gambler who played with Dubuc on the 1912 Tigers and was a central figure in the Black Sox Scandal.

=== Minor leagues ===
Although his major league career ended in 1919, Dubuc continued to play in the minor leagues for the Toledo Mud Hens of the American Association in 1920 and the Syracuse Stars of the International League in 1922 and 1923. During the 1921 season, with his role in the Black Sox Scandal under review, Dubuc played semi-pro baseball in Montreal in the Atwater Twi-Light League and the Montreal City Baseball League.

In 1924, Dubuc organized an Ottawa baseball team, called the Ottawa Aces, as part of the Ontario–Quebec–Vermont League. He also served as the team's player-manager in the 1924 season. He compiled a 2–2 record and a .286 batting average for Ottawa in 1924.

In 1925, he was hired as the manager of the Manchester, New Hampshire, team in the Boston Twilight League. Dubuc was a player-manager for Manchester, making an occasional appearance as a pitcher. He remained as player-manager of the Manchester in 1926 as it transitioned into the New England League, which was revived for the 1926 season. At age 37, he appeared in 10 games as a pitcher and compiled a 2–2 record with a 2.00 ERA. He also batted .311 in 61 at bats.

=== Chicago Black Sox Scandal ===
During the 1920 investigation into the Black Sox Scandal, evidence was discovered showing that Sleepy Bill Burns had advised Dubuc that the 1919 World Series had been fixed and that Dubuc should, therefore, bet on the Cincinnati Reds. Dubuc was neither a participant nor a conspirator in the scandal, but was pursued for his "guilty knowledge" of the fix. Sources are in conflict as to whether or not Dubuc was banned from baseball as a result of the investigation.

== Coach and scout ==
In December 1926, Dubuc signed a three-year contract to coach the Brown University baseball team. During the 1927-1928 and 1928–1929 seasons, he also coached the Brown ice hockey team.

From 1929 and into the 1930s, he also served as manager and president of a professional hockey team at Providence, Rhode Island, known as the Rhode Island Reds, as part of the Canadian–American Hockey League.

Dubuc also scouted for the Detroit Tigers in the late 1920s and 1930s. As a scout, he signed catcher Birdie Tebbetts and first baseman Hank Greenberg.

He also served as the manager of the New Bedford Whalers baseball team of the New England League during the 1936 season.

=== College hockey ===
Record table
Season	Team	Overall	Conference	Standing	Postseason
Brown Bears Independent (1927–1929)
1927–28	Brown	4–8–0			
1928–29	Brown	8–5–0			
Brown:		12–13–0			
Total:		12–13–0			
National champion Postseason invitational champion Conference regular season champion Conference regular season and conference tournament champion Division regular season champion Division regular season and conference tournament champion Conference tournament champion

== Later years ==
After Dubuc left baseball, he worked as a salesman for an ink company. He lived for the last five years of his life in Fort Myers, Florida. His wife died in 1956, and he died two years later at age 69 at a Fort Myers hospital.
