= 1911 Connecticut Aggies football team =

American college football season

1911 Connecticut Aggies football
- Conference: Athletic League of New England State Colleges
- Record: 0–5 (0–0 New England)
- Head coach: Leo Hafford (1st season)
- Home stadium: Athletic Fields

The 1911 Connecticut Aggies football team represented Connecticut Agricultural College—now known as the University of Connecticut—during the 1911 college football season. The Aggies began the season under the leadership of first-year head coach Leo Hafford, who died on October 1, the day after Connecticut's first game. Alfred Corp, who had played football at Brown University the prior year, was appointed as Hafford's replacement later that week. Connecticut finished the season with a record of 0–5. National Collegiate Athletic Association (NCAA) and Connecticut records credit the entire season to Hafford.

== Schedule ==
Date	Time	Opponent	Site	Result	Source
September 30		at Wesleyan*	Andrus Field; Middletown, CT	L 0–56	
October 7	3:00 p.m.	at Tufts*	Tufts athletic field; Medford, MA	L 0–49	
October 14		Williston*	Athletic Fields; Storrs, CT	L 3–11	
October 20		at Hotchkiss School*	Lakeville, CT	L 0–32	
November 11		at Monson Academy*	Monson, MA	L 3–18	
*Non-conference game
