= Frank Eustace =

American baseball player (1873–1932)

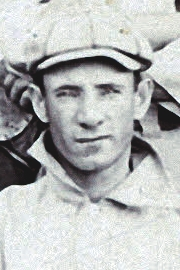
- Shortstop
- Born: November 7, 1873; New York, New York, U.S.
- Died: October 16, 1932 (aged 58); Pottsville, Pennsylvania, U.S.
- Batted: Unknown Threw: Unknown

MLB debut
- April 16, 1896, for the Louisville Colonels

Last MLB appearance
- June 21, 1896, for the Louisville Colonels

MLB statistics
- Batting average: .170
- Home runs: 1
- Runs batted in: 11
- Stats at Baseball Reference

Teams
- Louisville Colonels (1896)

Frank John Eustace (November 7, 1873 – October 16, 1932) was an American Major League Baseball catcher for the Louisville Colonels during the 1896 season. His minor league career lasted from 1894 through 1910 and included one year as a player/manager.
