= Montreal Royals =

- 1896–1960; Montreal, Quebec

Minor league affiliations
- Class: Class AAA (1946–1960); Class AA (1928–1945); Class B (1922–1924); Class AA (1912–1917); Class A (1897–1911)
- League: International League (1928–1960); Ontario–Quebec–Vermont League (1924); Eastern Canada League (1922–1923); International League (1912–1917); Eastern League (1897–1911)

Major league affiliations
- Team: Brooklyn/Los Angeles Dodgers (1939–1960); Pittsburgh Pirates (1937–1938); Philadelphia Athletics (1933–1934)

Minor league titles
- League titles (9): 1898; 1922; 1941; 1946; 1948; 1949; 1951; 1953; 1958

Team data
- Ballpark: Delorimier Downs; Atwater Park

The Montreal Royals (French: Royaux de Montréal) were a minor league professional baseball team in Montreal, Quebec, during 1897–1917 and 1928–1960. A member of the International League, the Royals were the top farm club (Class AAA) of the Brooklyn Dodgers from 1939; pioneering African-American player Jackie Robinson was a member for the 1946 season. The 1946 Royals were recognized as one of the 100 greatest minor league teams of all time.

== History ==
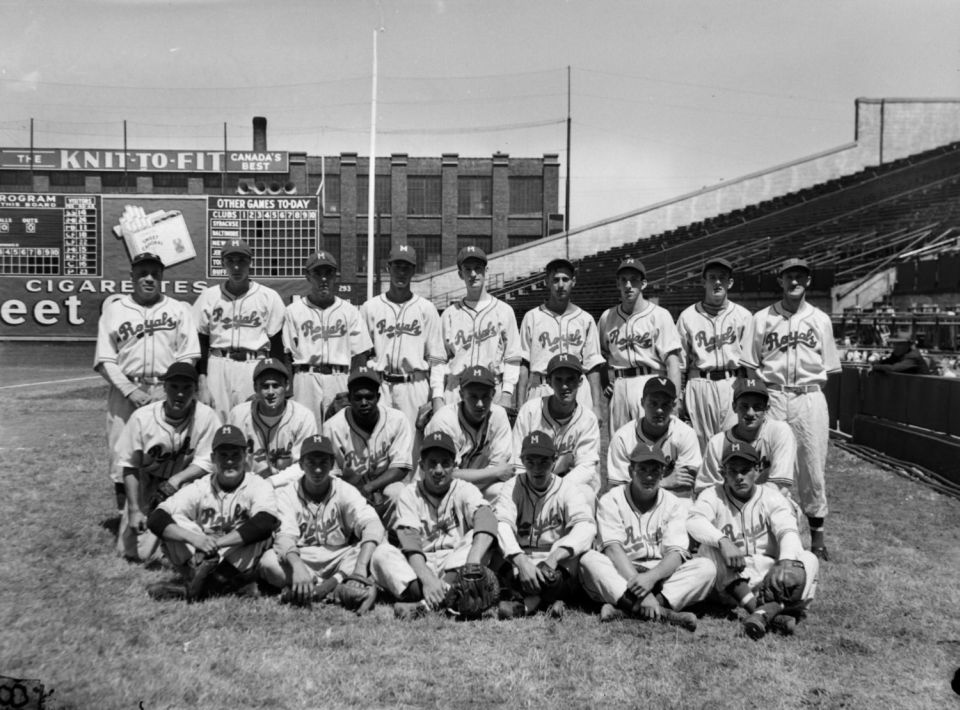
1948 team

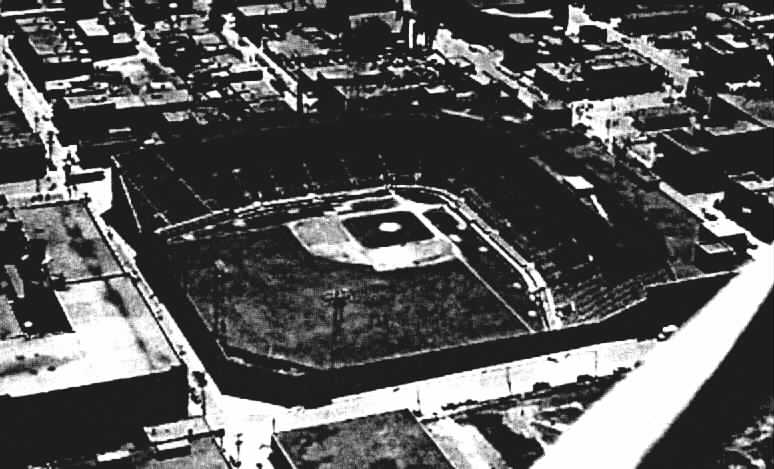
Delorimier Stadium, seen here in 1950, was the home of the Montreal Royals.

In 1928, George Stallings, a former Major League Baseball executive and Southern United States planter, formed a partnership with Montreal lawyer and politician Athanase David and businessman Ernest Savard to resurrect the Montreal Royals. Among the team's other local affluent notables were close friends Lucien Beauregard, Romeo Gauvreau, Hector H. Racine, and Charles E. Trudeau. Trudeau, businessman and father of the future 15th Prime Minister of Canada, Pierre Trudeau (and grandfather to the 23rd Prime Minister, Justin Trudeau), would remain on the Montreal Baseball Club Inc. Board of Directors until his death in 1935. Together these men financed and built Delorimier Stadium (also known as Montreal Stadium, Hector Racine Stadium and Delorimier Downs) at Delorimier Avenue and Ontario Street in east-end Montreal to serve as the team's home field.

This version of the Montreal Royals enjoyed great success, particularly after it became the top farm team of the Dodgers in 1939. The Royals launched the baseball careers of Sparky Anderson, Gene Mauch, Roberto Clemente and the man who broke Major League Baseball's color barrier with Montreal in 1946, Jackie Robinson. Other Royals' players of note include Duke Snider, Don Drysdale, Chuck Connors, Walter Alston, Roy Campanella, Johnny Podres and the winningest pitcher in the history of the team, Tommy Lasorda.

Baseball's Fabulous Montreal Royals book (1996) displaying Jackie Robinson on the cover

The team holds a unique place in baseball history for being the first major-league affiliate to break the so-called "baseball colour barrier". On October 23, 1945, two members of the Brooklyn National League Baseball Club Inc. Board of Directors, Montreal Royals owner and team president, Hector Racine, and Brooklyn Dodgers general manager, Branch Rickey, signed Jackie Robinson, an African-American. Robinson played with the Royals during the 1946 season. John Wright and Roy Partlow, black pitchers, also played with the Royals that year.

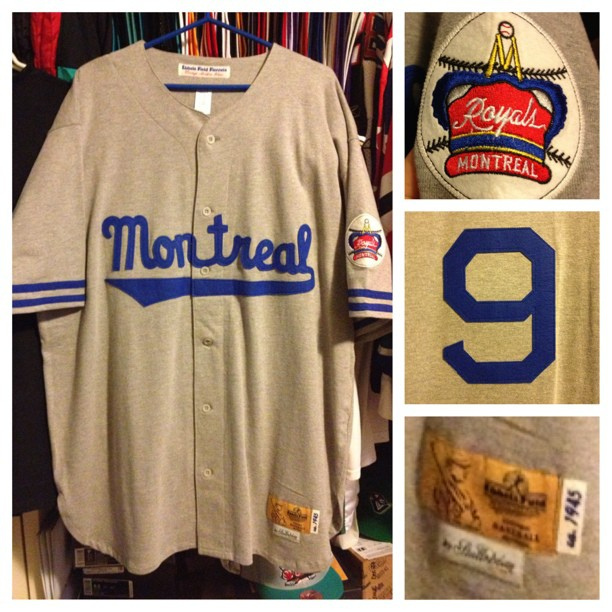
Jackie Robinson uniform worn with the Royals

During that season, Robinson faced the race-related resistance from his manager (a Mississippian, Clay Hopper) and teammates but soon won them over with his masterful play (beginning with his spectacular debut in the opening game against the Jersey City Giants) and courage facing hostile crowds and opponents. As for his home city, he was welcomed immediately by the public, who followed his performance that season with intense adoration. For the rest of his life, Robinson remained grateful to the people of Montreal for making the city a welcoming oasis for him and his wife during that difficult 1946 season. They lived in an apartment in a white, Francophone neighbourhood of Montreal that summer at 832 avenue de Gaspé.

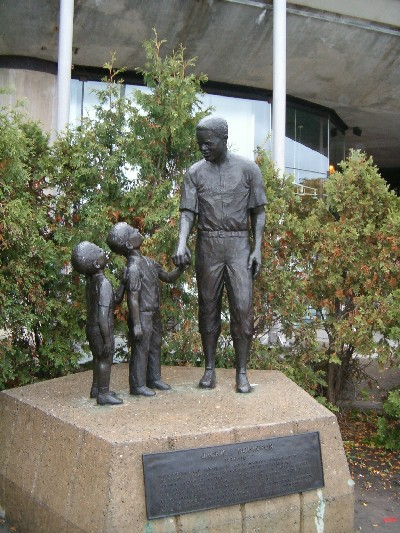
Statue at Montreal's Olympic Stadium of the Royals' most famous player, Jackie Robinson made by sculptor Jules Lasalle

Robinson then left to play for the Dodgers the following year, but not before winning the Little World Series and being chased by exultant Montreal fans right to the train as he left. In Ken Burns' documentary film Baseball, the narrator quotes Sam Maltin, a sports journalist with the Montreal Herald: "It was probably the only day in history that a black man ran from a white mob with love instead of lynching on its mind."

The Royals continued through the 1960 season, two years after the Dodgers moved to Los Angeles. On September 13, 1960, Dodgers President Walter O'Malley announced that due to weak attendance, the Dodgers were ending their 21-year affiliation with the team. While a new affiliation with the Minnesota Twins was arranged, efforts to keep the team in Montreal failed, and the franchise was relocated to Syracuse, New York, for 1961, and became the Syracuse Chiefs. Montreal would gain an MLB team, the Expos, in 1969; "Royals" was suggested as a nickname for that team but was taken instead by the new American League club in Kansas City.

== Titles ==
The Royals won the Governors' Cup, the championship of the IL, 7 times, and played in the championship series 11 times.

- 1935 – Lost to Syracuse
- 1941 – Defeated Newark
- 1945 – Lost to Newark
- 1946 – Defeated Syracuse
- 1948 – Defeated Syracuse
- 1949 – Defeated Buffalo
- 1951 – Defeated Syracuse
- 1952 – Lost to Rochester
- 1953 – Defeated Rochester
- 1954 – Lost to Syracuse
- 1958 – Defeated Toronto

== Montreal Royals records ==
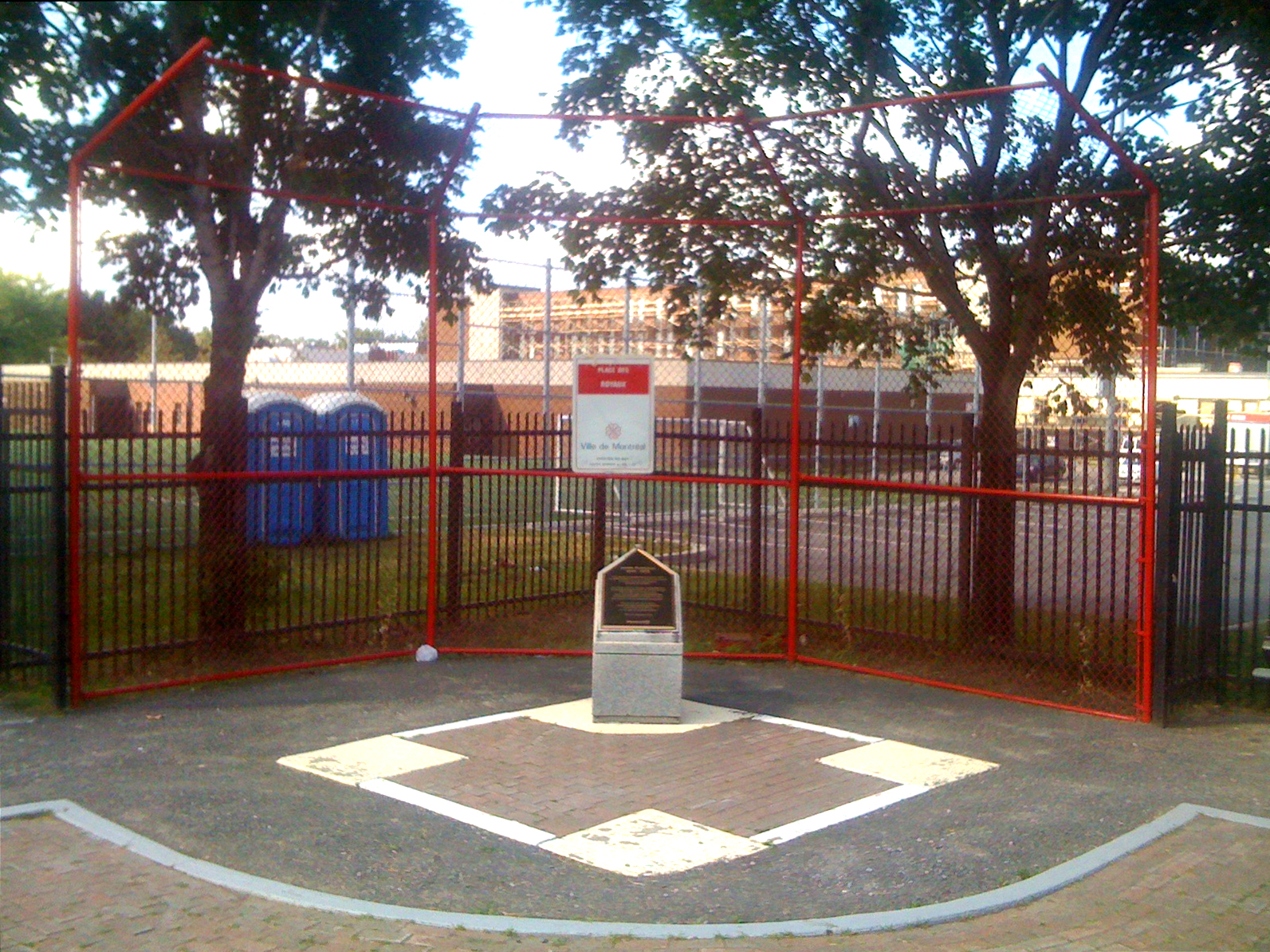
Royals and Jackie Robinson memorial at former location of Delorimier Stadium.

Year	Wins	Losses	Percentage	Finish
1897	49	76	.392	7th
1898	68	48	.586	1st
1899	62	51	.549	2nd
1900	54	72	.429	7th
1901	65	67	.492	6th
1902	59	77	.434	6th
1903	37	95	.280	7th
1904	67	62	.519	5th
1905	56	80	.412	6th
1906	57	83	.407	7th
1907	46	85	.351	8th
1908	64	75	.461	5th
1909	68	83	.450	6th
1910	71	80	.470	5th
1911	72	80	.474	5th
1912	71	81	.467	6th
1913	74	77	.490	5th
1914	60	89	.403	7th
1915	67	70	.489	5th
1916	75	64	.539	3rd
1917	56	94	.373	7th
1928	84	84	.500	5th
1929	88	79	.527	4th
1930	96	72	.571	3rd
1931	85	80	.515	4th
1932	90	78	.536	4th
1933	81	84	.490	6th
1934	73	77	.487	6th
1935	92	62	.597	1st
1936	71	81	.467	6th
1937	82	67	.550	2nd
1938	69	84	.451	6th
1939	64	88	.421	7th
1940	80	80	.500	5th
1941	90	64	.584	2nd
1942	82	71	.536	2nd
1943	76	76	.500	4th
1944	73	80	.477	6th
1945	95	58	.621	1st
1946	100	54	.649	1st
1947	93	60	.608	2nd
1948	94	59	.614	1st
1949	84	70	.545	3rd
1950	86	67	.562	2nd
1951	95	59	.617	1st
1952	95	56	.629	1st
1953	89	63	586	2nd
1954	88	66	.571	2nd
1955	95	59	.617	1st
1956	80	72	.526	4th
1957	68	86	.442	8th
1958	90	63	.588	1st
1959	72	82	.468	6th
1960	62	92	.403	8th

== Junior World Series appearances ==
Year	Winner	Loser	Margin of victory
1941	Columbus Red Birds	Royals	4 games to 2
1946	Royals	Louisville Colonels	4 games to 2
1948	Royals	St. Paul Saints	4 games to 1
1949	Indianapolis Indians	Royals	4 games to 2
1951	Milwaukee Brewers	Royals	4 games to 2
1953	Royals	Kansas City Blues	4 games to 1
1958	Minneapolis Millers	Royals	4 games to 2

== Montreal Royals managers ==
Year(s)	Name
1897	George Weidman
1897–1902	Charles Dooley
1903	Gene DeMontreville
1904	Charlie Atherton
1904	Ed Barrow
1905–1906	Jimmy Bannon
1906–1907	Malachi Kittridge
1907	James Morgan
1908–1909	Doc Casey
1910	Ed Barrow
1911	Edward J. McCafferty
1912	Billy Lush
1912–1914	Kitty Bransfield
1914–1917	Dan Howley
1928	George Stallings
1928–1932	Ed Holly
1932–1933	Doc Gautreau
1933–1934	Oscar Roettger
1934–1936	Frank Shaughnessy
1936	Harry Smythe
1937–1938	Walter "Rabbit" Maranville
1938	Alex Hooks
1939	Burleigh Grimes
1940–1942	Clyde Sukeforth
1943	Fresco Thompson
1944–1945	Bruno Betzel
1946–1949	Clay Hopper
1950–1953	Walter Alston
1954	Max Macon
1955–1957	Greg Mulleavy
1957	Al Campanis
1957	Al Ronning
1957	Tommy Holmes
1958–1960	Clay Bryant

== Notable former players ==
- Sparky Anderson – Major League Hall of Famer
- Joe Altobelli – World Series-winning manager
- Roy Campanella – Major League Baseball Hall of Famer
- Al Campanis – Major League scout and general manager
- Roberto Clemente – Major League Hall of Famer
- Chuck Connors – Major League first baseman and pinch-hitter
- Tommy Davis – Major League outfielder and corner infielder
- Don Drysdale – Major League Hall of Famer
- Carl Erskine – Major League pitcher
- George Gibson – Major League catcher and manager
- Jim Gilliam – Major League infielder
- Al Gionfriddo – Major League outfielder
- Carl Furillo – Major League outfielder
- Waite Hoyt – Major League Hall of Famer
- Sam Jethroe – Negro league and Major League center fielder
- Tommy Lasorda – Major League Hall of Famer
- Van Lingle Mungo – Major League pitcher
- Sam Nahem – Major League pitcher
- Don Newcombe – Major League pitcher
- Johnny Podres – Major League pitcher
- Pete Reiser – Major League outfielder
- Jackie Robinson – Major League Hall of Famer
- John Roseboro – Major League catcher
- Goody Rosen – Major League All Star outfielder
- Schoolboy Rowe – Major League All Star pitcher
- Duke Snider – Major League Hall of Famer
- George Shuba - Major League outfielder
- Bucky Walters – Major League pitcher
- Dick Williams – Major League outfielder-third baseman and World-Series-winning manager

== Montreal Royals in the Major League Baseball Hall of Fame ==
Name	Tenure
Walter Alston	Manager, 1950–1953
Ed Barrow	Manager, 1904, 1910
Roy Campanella	1947
Roberto Clemente	1954
Jocko Conlan	1931–1932
Don Drysdale	1955
Burleigh Grimes	Manager, 1939
Waite Hoyt	1917
Rabbit Maranville	Manager, 1937-1938
Jackie Robinson	1946
Duke Snider	1948

== International League awards ==
=== Most Valuable Pitcher ===
First Awarded in 1953

Year	Player	Statistics
1958	Tommy Lasorda	18 Wins, 6 Losses, 2.50 Earned Run Average

=== Most Valuable Player ===
Year	Player	Position	Home Runs	RBI	Batting Average	Special Notes
1948	Jimmy Bloodworth	Second Base	24	99	.294	.976 Fielding Percentage
1949	Bobby Morgan	Shortstop	19	112	.337	Led league in batting average
1952	Jim Gilliam	Second Base and Outfield	9	112	.301	Led league with 18 stolen bases
1953	Rocky Nelson	First Base	34	136	.308	Led league in RBIs
1955	Rocky Nelson	First Base	37	130	.364	Won Triple Crown

=== Rookie of the Year ===
First Awarded in 1950.

Year	Player	Position	Statistics
1951	Hector Rodriguez	Third Base	8 HR, 95 RBI, .302 Batting Average, 26 stolen bases
1956	Fred Kipp	Pitcher	20 Wins, 7 Losses, 3.33 ERA, 127 Strikeouts

=== Triple Crown Winner ===
Given to the player who leads the league in Home Runs, Runs Batted In, and Batting Average

Year	Player	Statistics
1955	Rocky Nelson	37 HR, 130 RBI, .364 Batting Average

== Notable media personnel ==
- Charles Mayer – French language radio broadcaster

== Bibliography ==
- William Brown (foreword by Ken Singleton): Baseball's Fabulous Montreal Royals (1996) Robert Davies Publishing, 1996 – ISBN 1-895854-64-4
