= Barre-Montpelier Intercities =

- 1904; (1887, 1904–1907, 1924); Barre (city), Vermont

Minor league affiliations
- Class: Independent (1887, 1904–1907); Class D (1907); Class B (1924)
- League: Northeastern League (1887); Vermont League (1904); Northern New York League (1904–1905); Independent Northern League (1906); New Hampshire State League (1907); Vermont State League (1907); Ontario–Quebec–Vermont League (1924)

Major league affiliations
- Team: None

Minor league titles
- League titles (1): 1907

Team data
- Name: Montpelier (1887); Barre (1904); Montpelier-Barre (1904–1905); Barre-Montpelier Intercities (1907); Montpelier Goldfish (1924)
- Ballpark: Barre Base Ball Grounds (1904–1907); Hubbard Park (1924)

The Barre-Montpelier Intercities were a minor league baseball team based in Barre, Vermont, in partnership with neighboring Montpelier. After playing as members of independent leagues in 1904 to 1906, the Barre-Montpelier Intercities played as members of two leagues in 1907. The Intercities were in first place in both the 1907 New Hampshire State and Vermont State League standings when the leagues permanently folded during the 1907 season.

Montpelier played in the 1887 Northeastern League, Barre hosted a 1904 Vermont League team, and the 1924 Montpelier team played in the Ontario–Quebec–Vermont League.

== History ==
Beginning in 1887, numerous semi-professional teams played in the Barre-Montpelier area, and Montpelier hosted a team in the Northeastern League. The 1887 league records and standings are unknown as the Montpelier team was managed by Fred Spaulding and William Lord.

In 1904 Barre first had minor league baseball when the city hosted a Barre team in the Independent Vermont League. The records and standings of this league are unknown.

In 1904, Montpelier-Barre began play as members of the Independent Northern New York League along with Burlington, Plattsburgh, Rutland and St. Albans. Montpelier-Barre continued play in the 1905 Northern New York League. League standings and statistics for both seasons are unknown. Arthur Daley managed the team in the 1905 four–team league which included Burlington, Plattsburgh and Rutland.

Montpelier-Barre continued play in joining the 1906 Northern Independent League. Their manager was Tonny Uniac. Other league members were Burlington, Ottawa, Plattsburgh and Rutland. There are no known standings or statistics for the league,

The Barre-Montpelier Intercities were a charter member when the 1907 New Hampshire State League formed as a Class D league. The league members were the Barre-Montpelier Intercities, Burlington Burlingtons, West Manchester (New Hampshire), Laconia/Plattsburgh Brewers, East Manchester (New Hampshire), Franklin, New Hampshire, Nashua, New Hampshire and Concord, New Hampshire teams. The Barre-Montpelier Intercities began league play on May 11, 1907. After four New Hampshire League teams folded early in the season, a meeting was held on June 17, 1907, where the league was restructured. At the meeting, the New Hampshire League was dissolved, and the Vermont State League was formed. The Vermont State League was structured as a four–team league, keeping three New Hampshire State League franchises, including Barre-Montpelier and adding an expansion team. Barre-Montpelier and the Vermont State League began play on July 2, 1907.

While playing in the New Hampshire State League, the Barre-Montpelier Intercities had a record of 19–6 and were in first place in the standings when the New Hampshire State League folded. The Intercities' manager was A. W. "Punch" Daley.

After the New Hampshire league folded, the Intercities continued minor league play in the newly formed Class D level 1907 Vermont State League. With Punch Daley remaining as manager, the Barre-Montpelier Intercities were in fir1st place with a 12–4 record when the league folded.

Minor league baseball returned when Montpelier briefly hosted the 1924 Montpelier Goldfish of the Class B level Ontario–Quebec–Vermont League. The team folded on July 16, 1924, finishing with a 16–37 record under manager Bill McCorry.

Barre, Vermont has not hosted another minor league team.

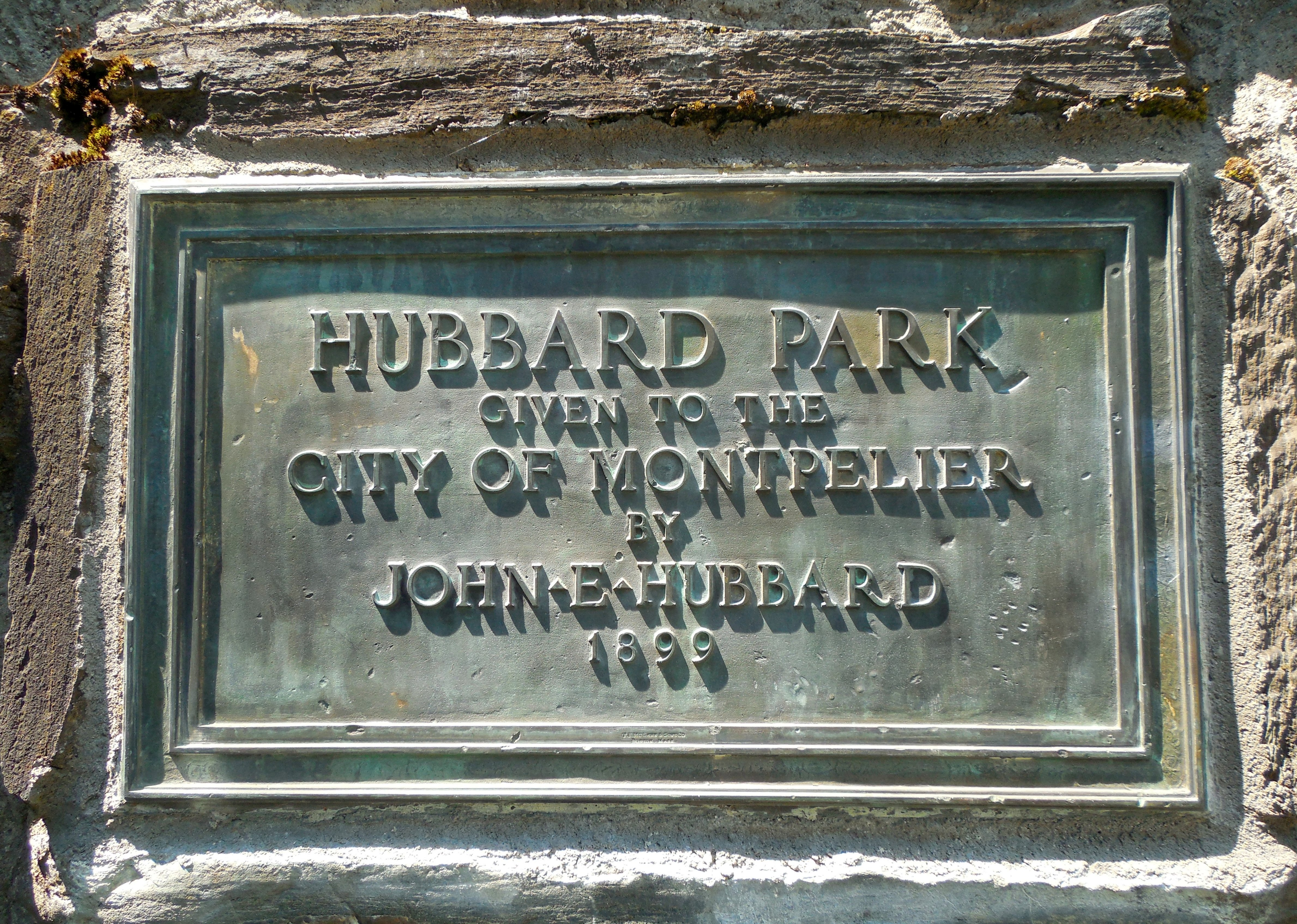
(2017) Hubbard Park Entrance Plaque. Montpelier, Vermont

== The ballparks ==
The Barre-Montpelier teams were noted to have played minor league home games at the Barre Base Ball Grounds between 1904 and 1907. The ballpark was located on Smith Street. It was near Berlin Street & the Jail Branch of the Winooski River in Barre, Vermont. Today, the site contains commercial businesses.

In their brief existence, the 1924 Montpelier Goldfish hosted minor league at home games Hubbard Park. Today, the park is still in use as a public park and is located along 12th Street in Montpelier, Vermont.

== Timeline ==
Year(s)	# Yrs.	Team	Level	League
1887	1	Montpelier	Independent	Northeastern League
1904	1	Barre	Independent	Vermont League
1904-1905	2	Montpelier-Barre	Independent	Northern New York League
1906	1	Montpelier-Barre	Independent	Independent Northern League
1907 (1)	1	Barre-Montpelier Intercities	Class D	New Hampshire State League
1907 (2)	1	Barre-Montpelier Intercities	Independent	Vermont State League
1924	1	Montpelier Goldfish	Class B	Ontario–Quebec–Vermont League

== Year–by–year records ==
Year	Record	Finish	Manager	Playoffs/Notes
1887	NA	NA	Fred Spaulding / William Lord	League records unknown
1904	NA	NA	NA	League records unknown
1905	NA	NA	Arthur Daley	League records unknown
1906	NA	NA	Tommy Uniac	League records unknown
1907 (1)	19–6	1st	A. W. "Punch" Daley	League disbanded June 17
1907 (2)	12–4	1st	A. W. "Punch" Daley	League disbanded July 29
1924	16–37	NA	Bill McCorry	Team folded July 16

== Notable alumni ==
- Jack Coombs (1905)
- Joe Evers (1924)
- Al Grabowski (1924)
- Eddie Grant (baseball) (1905)
- Bill McCorry (1924, MGR)
- Al Moore (1924)
- Shag Shaughnessy (1905)
- Tom Stankard (1905)
- George Walker (1887)

=== See also ===
- Montpelier-Barre players
  Montpelier Goldfish players
