= Leo Hafford =

American baseball player (1883–1911)

- Pitcher
- Born: September 17, 1883; Somerville, Massachusetts, U.S.
- Died: October 1, 1911 (aged 28); Willimantic, Connecticut, U.S.
- Batted: Unknown Threw: Right

MLB debut
- April 15, 1906, for the Cincinnati Reds

Last MLB appearance
- April 24, 1906, for the Cincinnati Reds

MLB statistics
- Win–loss record: 1–1
- Earned run average: 0.95
- Strikeouts: 5
- Stats at Baseball Reference

Teams
- Cincinnati Reds (1906)

Leo Edgar Hafford (September 17, 1883 – October 1, 1911) was an American professional baseball player who played pitcher in the major leagues. He attended Tufts University and Bowdoin College, and went on to coach football at the University of Connecticut in 1911. He served as head coach only briefly, as he died from typhoid fever three weeks after accepting the position. He coached only coaching one game, but was credited as head coach for the whole season.

Hafford was born in Somerville, Massachusetts and graduated from the Knapp Grammar and Somerville High School. He played on the football team at Bowdoin. Hafford coached the football team at Needham High School in Needham, Massachusetts and assisted Charles Cuddy in coaching the football team at Somerville High.

== Head coaching record ==
=== College ===
| Year | Team | Overall | Conference | Standing | Bowl/playoffs |
|---|---|---|---|---|---|
Connecticut Aggies (Athletic League of New England State Colleges) (1911)
| 1911 | Connecticut | 0–5 | 0–0 | | |
| Connecticut: | | 0–5 | 0–0 | | |
| Total: | | 0–5 | | | |
