= Vermont State League =

American minor league baseball league

- Formerly: New Hampshire State League
- Classification: Independent (1907)
- Sport: Minor League Baseball
- First season: July 2, 1907
- Folded: July 28, 1907
- President: Unknown
- No. of teams: 4
- Country: United States of America
- Most titles: 1 Barre-Montpelier Intercities (1907)

The Vermont State League was a minor league baseball league that played briefly in the 1907 season. The four–team Independent level Vermont State League consisted of franchises based in New York and Vermont. The Vermont State League evolved when the New Hampshire State League changed names during the 1907 season. Both leagues played just their portion 1907 season, before permanently folding as minor leagues.

== History ==
The New Hampshire State League formed and began play in the 1907 season as a Class D level league. The league played with the Barre-Montpelier Intercities, Burlington Burlingtons, West Manchester (New Hampshire), Laconia/Plattsburgh Brewers, East Manchester (New Hampshire), Franklin, New Hampshire, Nashua, New Hampshire and Concord, New Hampshire teams. The 1907 New Hampshire State League was an eight–team league that began play on May 11, 1907.

Four New Hampshire League teams folded early in the season. A meeting was held on June 17, 1907, where the league was restructured. At the meeting, the New Hampshire League was dissolved and the Vermont State League was formed as a four–team league, keeping three New Hampshire State League franchises and adding an expansion team. The Vermont State League began play on July 2, 1907.

The Vermont State League continued play as an Independent four–team league beginning, July 2, 1907, without the previous New Hampshire franchises and had a brief period of play. The new franchise in the Vermont State League was Rutland, Vermont, who joined the New Hampshire League champion Barre-Montpelier Intercities, the Burlington Burlingtons and Plattsburgh Brewers in the newly formed Vermont State League. The Vermont League permanently folded after the 1907 season ended on July 28, 1907. The Barre-Montpelier Intercities led in the final standings of the Vermont League with a 12–4 record under manager A.W. Daley. Barre-Montpelier was followed by the Burlington Burlingtons (6–5), Rutland (5–8) and the Plattsburgh Brewers (5–11).

== Vermont State League teams ==
Team name	City represented	Ballpark	Year(s) active
Barre-Montpelier Intercities	Barre, Vermont & Montpelier, Vermont	Barre Base Ball Grounds	1907
Burlington Burlingtons	Burlington, Vermont	Centennial Field	1907
Plattsburgh Brewers	Plattsburgh, New York	Clinton Park	1907
Rutland	Rutland, Vermont	Unknown	1907

== 1907 Vermont State League overall standings ==
Team standings	W	L	PCT	GB	Managers
Barre-Montpelier Intercities	12	4	.750	–	A.W. Daley
Burlington Burlingtons	6	5	.545	3½	John Leighton; Tom Hays / T.K. Milne
Rutland	5	8	.384	5½	T.K. Milne
Plattsburgh Brewers	5	11	.312	6	W. Van Duzen
