= Doc Amole =

American baseball player (1878–1912)

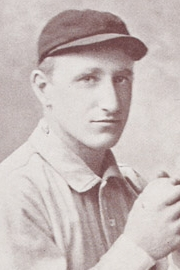
- Pitcher
- Born: January 1, 1874; Coatesville, Pennsylvania, U.S.
- Died: March 9, 1912 (aged 33); Wilmington, Delaware, U.S.
- Batted: Right Threw: Left

MLB debut
- August 19, 1897, for the Baltimore Orioles

Last MLB appearance
- May 17, 1898, for the Washington Senators

MLB statistics
- Win–loss record: 4–10
- Earned run average: 4.75
- Strikeouts: 30
- Stats at Baseball Reference

Teams
- Baltimore Orioles (1897); Washington Senators (1898)

Morris George "Doc" Amole (January 1, 1874 – March 9, 1912) was an American professional baseball player who career spanned nine season, including parts of two in Major League Baseball with the Baltimore Orioles (1897) and the Washington Senators (1898). On both occasions, Amole was the youngest player in the National League at the age of 18 and 19, respectively. Over his major league career, Amole compiled a record of 4–10 with a 4.75 earned run average (ERA) and 30 strikeouts in 18 games, 12 starts. In those 12 starts, 10 were complete games. Amole also played in the minor leagues with the Class-A Wilmington Peaches (1896), the Class-B Reading Actives (1897), the Class-A Buffalo Bisons (1898–1903) and the Class-A Providence Grays (1903–1904). Over his career in the minors, Amole compiled a record of 108–137 in 227 games. As a member of the American League Buffalo Bisons in 1900, a year before the league turned major, Amole threw a no-hitter against the Detroit Tigers.

== Professional career ==
=== Early career ===
In 1896, Amole began his professional baseball career with the Class-A Wilmington Peaches of the Atlantic League. During a game on July 4, 1896, in the first recorded night game in Atlantic League history, Amole pulled a practical joke by replacing the ball with an explosive. Amole threw the pitch to Honus Wagner who made contact with the explosive, setting off a large spark, causing the crowd to erupt in anger and the already unpopular game was ended immediately. During that season, Amole compiled a record of 22–24 with a 2.54 earned run average (ERA) in 55 games, 47 starts. Of those starts, 43 were complete games. Amole led the league in losses and was fifth in wins. Amole started the 1897 season with the Class-B Reading Actives. He went 12–22 with a 1.75 ERA, 74 strikeouts, 31 complete games and two shutouts in 36 games, all starts. Amole was third in the Atlantic League in losses that season.

=== Major League Baseball ===
During the 1897 season, Amole joined the Baltimore Orioles of Major League Baseball's National League. He made his debut on August 19, 1897, becoming the youngest person in the National League that season at the age of 18. Amole was a "fill-in" pitcher while in Baltimore. On the season, Amole compiled a record of 4–4 with a 2.57 ERA, 19 strikeouts and six complete game in 11 games, seven starts. His ERA led all Orioles pitchers that season. In December 1897, the Baltimore Orioles traded Amole with Jack Doyle and Heinie Reitz to the Washington Senators in exchange for Doc McJames, Dan McGann and Gene DeMontreville. When he made his debut with the Senators, Amole was again the youngest player in the National League at the age of 19. In 1897, Amole went 0–6 with a 7.84 ERA, four complete games and 11 strikeouts in seven games, five starts.

=== Later career ===
Amole joined the Class-A Buffalo Bisons in 1898 playing 24 games with them, going 11–11 with 21 complete games and one shutout. Amole did not play professional baseball in 1899, but did return to the Bisons in 1900. On Opening Day in 1900, Amole pitched a no-hitter, making it the first one thrown in American League history. There was a claim that Amole had thrown the first Opening Day no-hitter in Major League Baseball history, but since the American League was a minor league at the time, the claim is not true. During the 1900 season, Amole went 22–22 with 35 complete games, two shutouts in 47 games, 41 starts. Amongst fellow American League pitchers that season, Amole was second in wins and losses. Amole continued playing with the Bisons in 1901, going 11–25 in 37 games. Amole was first in the Eastern League, which the Bisons became affiliated with after the American League became a part of Major League Baseball, in losses that season. In 1903 with Buffalo, Amole went 14–12 in 28 games. Amole split the 1904 season between the Bisons and the Class-A Providence Grays. Between the two team, Amole went 8–10. During his final season in professional baseball in 1904, Amole played with the Grays, going 8–11.

=== Death ===
Amole was found dead on the floor of his room at a boarding house in Wilmington, Delaware on March 9, 1912. The cause of death was officially determined to be pulmonary arrest due to congestion of the lungs.
