= Jack Doscher =

American baseball player (1880–1971)

- Pitcher
- Born: July 27, 1880; Troy, New York, U.S.
- Died: May 27, 1971 (aged 90); Park Ridge, New Jersey, U.S.
- Batted: Left Threw: Left

MLB debut
- July 2, 1903, for the Chicago Cubs

Last MLB appearance
- July 30, 1908, for the Cincinnati Reds

MLB statistics
- Win–loss record: 2–10
- Earned run average: 2.84
- Strikeouts: 61
- Stats at Baseball Reference

Teams
- Chicago Cubs (1903); Brooklyn Superbas (1903–1906); Cincinnati Reds (1908)

John Henry Doscher, Jr. (July 27, 1880 – May 27, 1971) was an American left-handed pitcher in Major League Baseball from 1903 to 1908. Born in Troy, New York, he played for the Cincinnati Reds, Brooklyn Superbas, and Chicago Cubs. His father Herm Doscher had also been a major league player, as well as an umpire. Doscher is the first son of a former Major League player to play in the Major Leagues. Jack Doscher died in Park Ridge, New Jersey at age 90. His name is pronounced like dusher.

== See also ==
- List of second-generation Major League Baseball players
