= Bill McCorry =

American baseball player (1887-1973)

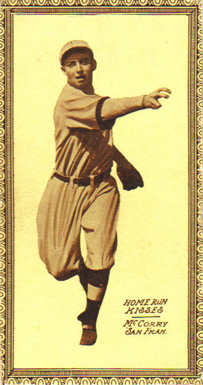
- Pitcher
- Born: July 9, 1887; Saranac, New York, U.S.
- Died: March 22, 1973 (aged 85); Augusta, Georgia, U.S.
- Batted: Left Threw: Right

MLB debut
- September 17, 1909, for the St. Louis Browns

Last MLB appearance
- September 29, 1909, for the St. Louis Browns

MLB statistics
- Win–loss record: 0–2
- Earned run average: 9.00
- Strikeouts: 10
- Stats at Baseball Reference

Teams
- St. Louis Browns (1909)

William Charles McCorry (July 9, 1887 – March 22, 1973) was an American Major League Baseball pitcher who played for the St. Louis Browns in 1909. He had a long career as a player/manager in the minor leagues that lasted as late as 1942, including lengthy stints with the Albany Senators and Ogden Reds. He also served as traveling secretary for the New York Yankees and general manager of the Augusta Yankees.

In the late 1940s, McCorry also served as a scout. The Yankees sent him to Birmingham in 1949 to evaluate Willie Mays, but they passed on pursuing the prospect after McCorry complained that he "couldn't hit a curveball."
