= Jamestown Giants =

- 1914; (1914-1915); Jamestown, New York

Minor league affiliations
- Class: Class D (1914-1915)
- League: Interstate League (1914-1915)

Major league affiliations
- Team: None

Minor league titles
- League titles (1): 1914
- Conference titles (1): 1914

Team data
- Name: Jamestown Giants (1914); Jamestown Rabbits (1915)
- Ballpark: Allen Park* (1914-1915)

The Jamestown Giants were a minor league baseball team based in Jamestown, New York. In 1914 and 1915, Jamestown teams played exclusively as members of the Class D level Interstate League, with the Giants winning the 1914 league championship. Jamestown played as the "Rabbits" in 1915, with the team folding before the end of the season.

== History ==
Minor league baseball began in Jamestown with the 1890 "Jamestown" team who won the championship in the independent New York-Pennsylvania League. The Giants were immediately preceded in minor league play by the 1906 Oil City-Jamestown Oseejays, who were members of the Class D level Interstate League.

The Jamestown "Giants" rejoined the six team, Class D Interstate League, which reformed for the 1914 season. The Bradford Drillers, Hornell Green Sox, Olean Refiners, Warren Bingoes and Wellsville Rainmakers teams joined Jamestown in beginning league play on May 22, 1914.

The Giants won the league pennant and championship in their first season of play. The Giants ended the Class D level Interstate League regular season in first place in the six–team league. With a record of 59–40, Jamestown was managed by Joe Lohr. In the final standings, the Giants finished 1.0 game ahead of the second place Bradford Drillers (59-42). The league held a playoff, which was won by Jamestown, defeating Bradford 4 games to 3 to claim the championship.

In 1915, the renamed "Jamestown Rabbits" continued Class D level Interstate League play, but folded before the end of the season, which saw two teams have a contentious tie in the final league standings. On August 20, 1915, the Jamestown franchise folded. The Rabbits ended their season with a 28–42 record playing their partial season under manager Bill Webb. The Olean White Sox with a 52–30 record (.634) ended the season in a first-place statistical tie with the Wellsville Rainmakers, who finished 54–32 (.628). Wellsville had captured the second half title of the split season schedule and Olean had captured the first half title. Following the conclusion of the regular season, Olean refused to play in a playoff with Wellsville and the title was awarded to Wellsville. Pitcher Lefty Webb, who played for Jamestown and then Hornell led the league with both 14 wins and 152 strikeouts in 1915.

Following the folding of the Jamestown Rabbits in 1915, manager Billy Webb formed an independent semi-pro team called "Billy Webb's Spiders."

In 1916, the Interstate League continued play without a Jamestown franchise. Jamestown next hosted minor league baseball over two decades later, when the 1939 Jamestown Jaguars, began play as members of the Class D level Pennsylvania–Ontario–New York League, starting a long tenure for the Jamestown franchise in the league.

== The ballpark ==
The name of the Jamestown home minor league ballpark is not directly referenced. Allen Park hosted organized baseball in the era. Today, the 35-acre Allen Park is still in use as a public park with a ballfield and other amenities. It is located at 311 Hughes Street in Jamestown.

== Timeline ==
Year(s)	# Yrs.	Team	Level	League
1914	1	Jamestown Giants	Class D	Interstate League
1915	1	Jamestown Rabbits	Class D	Interstate League

== Year–by–year records ==
Year	Record	Finish	Manager	Playoffs/notes
1914	59–40	1st	Joe Lohr	Won league finals
1915	28–42	NA	Bill Webb	Team folded August 14

== Notable alumni ==
- Petie Behan (1915)
- Vince Molyneaux (1914)
- Lefty Webb (1915)

== See also ==
Jamestown Giants players
Jamestown Rabbits players
