= Interstate League =

Minor leagues in American baseball

- Sport: Minor league baseball
- Founded: 1896
- First season: 1896
- Folded: 1952
- No. of teams: 63
- Country: United States
- Most titles: Wilmington Blue Rocks (4); Lancaster Red Roses (4)
- Website: None

The Interstate League was the name of five different American minor baseball leagues that played intermittently from 1896 through 1952.

== Early leagues ==
Earlier versions of the Interstate League, with years active:

- 1896–1901: a Class B circuit with teams in Ohio, Indiana, Michigan, Kentucky, and West Virginia.
- 1905-08; 1914-16: a Class D league with clubs in Pennsylvania and New York.
- 1913: a Class C league operating in Ohio, Pennsylvania and West Virginia.
- 1932: a Class D circuit based in Pennsylvania and New Jersey.

In addition, a Class C level Interstate Association existed for one season, 1906, in Michigan, Indiana and Ohio.

== 1895 to 1900 Interstate League ==
=== Cities represented 1895 – 1900 ===
- Akron, OH: Akron 1895
- Anderson, IN: Anderson 1900
- Canton, OH: Canton Duebers 1895
- Columbus, OH: Columbus Buckeyes 1895, Columbus Senators 1899–1901
- Dayton, OH: Dayton Old Soldiers 1897–1898, Dayton Veterans 1899–1900, Dayton Old Soldiers 1901
- Findlay, OH: Findlay 1895
- Fort Wayne, IN: Fort Wayne Farmers 1896, Fort Wayne Indians 1897–1900, Fort Wayne Railroaders 1901
- Grand Rapids, MI: Grand Rapids Cabinet Makers 1898, Grand Rapids Furniture Makers 1899
- Jackson, MI: Jackson Wolverines 1896
- Kenton, OH: Kenton 1895
- Lima, OH: Lima 1895
- Mansfield, OH: Mansfield 1895, Mansfield Haymakers 1897–1900
- Marion, IN: Marion Glass Blowers 1900
- New Castle, PA: New Castle Quakers 1896–1900
- Saginaw, MI: Saginaw Lumbermen 1896
- Springfield, OH: Springfield Governors 1897–1898, Springfield Wanderers 1899
- Steubenville, OH: Steubenville Stubs 1895
- Toledo, OH: Toledo Swamp Angels 1896, Toledo Mud Hens 1896–1900
- Dennison, OH & Uhrichsville, OH: Twin Cities Twins 1895
- Washington, PA: Washington Little Senators 1896
- Wheeling, WV: Wheeling Nailers 1895–1897, Wheeling Stogies 1899–1900
- Youngstown, OH: Youngstown Puddlers 1896–1898, Youngstown Little Giants 1899–1900

=== Standings & statistics 1895 to 1900 ===
1895 Interstate League - schedule
President: Howard H. Zeigler

Team standings	W	L	PCT	GB	Managers
Twin Cities Twins	38	22	.633	-	Jack Darrah
Wheeling Nailers	34	22	.607	2	Ed Barrow
Findlay	32	21	.604	2½	Charles Stroebel / Howard Brandenberg
Kenton	29	28	.509	7½	Davis / Tony Zander
Columbus Buckeyes	28	31	.475	9½	Buck West
Steubenville Stubs / Akron / Lima	21	39	.350	17	George Moreland / George Rhue; Timothy Donovan
Canton Duebers	11	15	.423	NA	Walter Goble
Lima / Mansfield	8	23	.258	NA	Andy Sommers / Frank O'Brien

Canton folded June 2; Lima moved to Mansfield May 5, Mansfield folded July 14; Steubenville moved to Akron May 10; Akron moved to Lima May 19, Lima folded July 15.
League folded July 15

Player statistics
Player	Team	Stat	Tot
Reddy Grey	Findlay	Runs	64
Reddy Grey	Findlay	Hits	80
Reddy Grey	Findlay	HR	14

1896 Intestate League
President: Charles B. Powers

Team standings	W	L	PCT	GB	Managers
Toledo Mud Hens	86	46	.652	-	Charles Strobel / Frank Torreyson
Fort Wayne Farmers	70	36	.660	8½	George Tebeau
Wheeling Nailers	57	60	.487	18½	Issac Hughes / John Darrah
Youngstown Puddlers	54	57	.486	18½	Art Anderson / Charles Hazen
Jackson Wolverines	53	56	.486	18½	Alex McDonald / Leigh Lynch
New Castle Quakers	53	59	.473	20	Jay Faatz / Malcolm Whitehill
Washington Little Senators	43	70	.381	30½	Byron McKeown
Saginaw Lumbermen	40	73	.354	33½	George Black

Ft. Wayne folded in early September
Playoff: Toledo 4 games, Fort Wayne 0; won by forfeit when Fort Wayne disbanded

Player statistics
Player	Team	Stat	Tot	Player	Team	Stat	Tot
Erve Beck	Toledo	BA	.371	George Kelb	Toledo	W	25
Erve Beck	Toledo	Runs	101				
Erve Beck	Toledo	Hits	171				
Jake Ganzel	New Castle	HR	17				

1897 Interstate League
President: Charles B. Powers

Team standings	W	L	PCT	GB	Managers
Toledo Mud Hens	83	43	.659	-	Charles Strobel
Dayton Old Soldiers	74	51	.592	8½	Frank Torreyson / Bill Armour
New Castle Quakers	72	54	.571	11	Paul Russell / Hurd
Fort Wayne Indians	63	59	.516	18	Fred Cooke
Mansfield Haymakers	63	61	.508	19	Con Strothers / Barton Howard
Youngstown Puddlers	59	66	.472	23½	John Scheible / Edward Zinram
Springfield Governors	46	79	.368	36½	Harry Rinehart / Lew Whistler
Wheeling Nailers	38	85	.309	43½	William Harrington / Frank Torreyson

Playoff: Toledo 4 games, Dayton 2.

Player statistics
Player	Team	Stat	Tot	Player	Team	Stat	Tot
Bade Myers	Toledo	BA	.411	Kid Keenan	Toledo	W	20
Bill Hartman	Toledo	Runs	152	Chase Alloway	Fort Wayne	ERA	1.00
Bob Gilks	Toledo	Hits	208	John Blue	Toledo	Pct	.857; 18-3
Dummy Kihm	Fort Wayne	HR	17				
Joe Reiman	Dayton	HR	17				
Joe Werrick	Mansfield	HR	17				
Jimmy Cooper	Youngstown	SB	77				

1898 Interstate League - schedule
President: Charles B. Powers

Team standings	W	L	PCT	GB	Managers
Dayton Old Soldiers	84	65	.564	-	Bill Armour
Toledo Mud Hens	86	68	.558	½	Charles Strobel
Springfield Governors	81	66	.551	2	Lew Whistler
New Castle Quakers	81	69	.540	3½	Pop Lytle
Grand Rapids Cabinet Makers	75	79	.487	11½	Frank Torreyson
Mansfield Haymakers	71	75	.486	11½	Barton Howard
Fort Wayne Indians	71	84	.458	16	Fred Cooke / Eddie O'Meara; George Geer
Youngstown Puddlers	53	96	.356	31	George Geer / Paul Russell; Robert Pender

No playoffs held

Player statistics
Player	Team	Stat	Tot	Player	Team	Stat	Tot
Bill Hartman	Toledo	BA	.340	Bob Ewing	Toledo	W	25
Bill Hartman	Toledo	Runs	167	Charlie Ferguson	Toledo	W	25
Bill Hartman	Toledo	Hits	214	Charles Smith	New Castle	SO	184
Joe Reiman	Dayton	HR	14	Nick Altrock	Grand Rapids	Pct	.850; 17-3
Thayer Torreyson	Grand Rapids	SB	73				

1899 Interstate League - schedule
President: Charles B. Powers

Team standings	W	L	PCT	GB	Managers
New Castle Quakers	87	53	.621	-	Pat Wright
Mansfield Haymakers	86	54	.614	1	Dan Lowney
Fort Wayne Indians	82	58	.586	5	Jack Glasscock
Toledo Mud Hens	82	58	.586	5	Charles Strobel
Youngstown Little Giants	60	79	.432	26½	Harry Truby / Jimmy McAleer
Wheeling Stogies	58	81	.417	28½	Pop Lytle / Tom Nicholson
Dayton Veterans	55	85	.393	32	Bill Armour
Grand Rapids Furniture Makers / Columbus Senators / Springfield Wanderers	49	91	.350	38	Frank Torreyson

Grand Rapids moved to Columbus July 20; Columbus moved to Springfield July 30.
No Playoffs held.

Player statistics
Player	Team	Stat	Tot	Player	Team	Stat	Tot
Billy Taylor	Young/Grand/Wheel	BA	.331	Roscoe Miller	Mansfield	W	28
Bill Hartman	Toledo	Runs	117	Theodore Guese	Fort Wayne	Pct	.714; 25-10
Erve Beck	Toledo	Hits	185				
Erve Beck	Toledo	HR	25				
Jerry McDonough	Toledo	SB	89				

1900 Interstate League
President: Charles B. Powers

Team standings	W	L	PCT	GB	Managers
Dayton Veterans	90	43	.677	-	Bill Armour
Fort Wayne Indians	85	53	.616	7½	Jack Glasscock / Joe Hubbard
Toledo Mud Hens	81	58	.583	12	Charles Strobel
Wheeling Stogies	76	58	.568	14½	Pop Lytle / Pete Healy
Mansfield Haymakers	67	68	.496	24	Dan Lowney
Columbus Senators / Anderson	58	78	.427	33½	Jesse Quinn
Youngstown / Marion Glass Blowers	44	92	.324	47½	Mike J. Finn / Pat Wright
New Castle Quakers	44	95	.317	49	Pat Wright / Jack Wadsworth

Columbus (51-63) moved to Anderson, Indiana, August 22; Youngstown (28-67) moved to Marion August 5.
Playoff: Fort Wayne 4 games, Dayton 3.

Player statistics
Player	Team	Stat	Tot	Player	Team	Stat	Tot
Erve Beck	Toledo	BA	.360	Cy Swaim	Fort Wayne	W	24
Otto Krueger	Fort Wayne	Runs	131	Bumpus Jones	Fort Wayne	Pct	.786; 11-3
Erve Beck	Toledo	Hits	207				
Ed Bradley	Columbus/Anderson	HR	18				

== 1905 to 1908 Interstate League ==
=== Cities represented 1905 – 1908 ===
- Bradford, PA: Bradford Drillers 1905–1908
- Coudersport, PA: Coudersport Giants 1905
- DuBois, PA: DuBois Miners 1905–1907
- Erie, PA: Erie Fishermen 1905,1907–1908, Erie Sailors 1906
- Franklin, PA: Franklin Millionaires 1907–1908
- Hornell, NY: Hornell Pigmies 1906
- Jamestown, NY: Jamestown Hill Climbers 1905
- Kane, PA: Kane Mountaineers 1905–1907
- Oil City, PA: Oil City Cubs 1907–1908
- Oil City-Jamestown, PA/NY: Oil City-Jamestown Oseejays 1906
- Olean, NY: Olean Refiners 1905–1907; Olean Candidates 1908
- Patton, PA: Patton 1906
- Punxsutawney, PA: Punxsutawney Policemen 1906–1907
- Warren, PA: Warren Blues 1908

=== Standings & statistics 1905 to 1908 ===
1905 Interstate League
President: Frank Baumeister / George F. Rindernecht

Team standings	W	L	PCT	GB	Managers
Coudersport Giants	59	38	.608	-	Harry Knight / John Lawley
Erie Fishermen	58	39	.598	1	Daniel Koster / Bob McLaughlin; Jack Burke
Olean Refiners	54	50	.519	8½	Al Lawson / Eddie Foster
Bradford Drillers	46	54	.460	14½	William Leary / Frederick Paige
Kane Mountaineers	40	56	.417	18½	C.R. Eichelberger
Jamestown Hill Climbers / DuBois Miners	40	60	.400	20½	J. Lawrence Alexander / Paul Wrath; Menzo Sibley

Jamestown (18–23) Moved to DuBois July 12.
No playoffs held

Player statistics
Player	Team	Stat	Tot
Duke Servaitius	Kane	BA	.352
Julius Streib	Coudersport	Runs	63

1906 Interstate League
President: George F. Rindernecht

Team standings	W	L	PCT	GB	Managers
Erie Sailors	65	41	.613	-	Tom O'Hara
Punxsutawney Policemen	53	45	.541	8	W.J. Brown
Bradford Drillers	61	53	.535	8	Thomas News
DuBois Miners	52	52	.500	12	James Breen / Ed Larkin
Kane Mountaineers	58	58	.500	12	James Collopy
Hornell Pigmies / Patton	53	56	.486	13½	John Quinn
Olean Refiners	50	62	.446	18	John Ziegler / John Dailey
Oil City-Jamestown Oseejays	44	69	.389	24½	Alfred Lawson / C.L. Rexford

Hornell (35–31) moved to Patton August 6.
No Playoffs Scheduled.
No player statistics available.

1907 Interstate League
schedule
President: Frank Baumeister

Team standings	W	L	PCT	GB	Managers
Erie Fishermen	64	51	.557	-	Thomas Reynolds
Bradford Drillers	63	54	.538	2	Eddie Foster
Franklin Millionaires	51	52	.495	7	L.L. Jacklin / George Rinderknecht
Oil City Cubs	54	57	.486	8	James Collopy
DuBois Miners	36	26	.581	NA	Ed Larkin
Kane Mountaineers	17	26	.395	NA	Pop Kelchner
Olean Refiners	12	35	.255	NA	Joe Flynn
Punxsutawney Policemen	33	26	.559	NA	Milt Montgomery / W.J. Brown

Kane folded July 16; Olean disbanded July 18; Punxsutawney folded August 3; DuBois folded August 5.
The league played a third season, August 7 through September 8, won by Bradford.
Oil City awarded the first half champion when DuBois folded. Playoff: Oil City 4 games, Bradford 3.

Player statistics
Player	Team	Stat	Tot	Player	Team	Stat	Tot
Jake Weimer	DuBois/Oil City	BA	.338	Doc Hazleton; Bill Kirwin	Bradford; Bradford	W	16; 16
Ben Jewell	Oil City	Runs	66	Jiggs Parson	Oil City	Pct	.750; 15–5
Earl Sykes	Oil City	Hits	108				

1908 Interstate League
President: C.L. Rexford

Team standings	W	L	PCT	GB	Managers
Olean Candidates	16	2	.882	-	Percy Stetler
Warren Blues	11	8	.500	6½	Thomas McNeal
Bradford Drillers	12	9	.650	3½	George Rinderknecht
Franklin Millionaires	8	13	.333	9½	Bill Smith
Oil City Cubs	6	11	.316	10	C.L. Rexford / James Collopy
Erie Fishermen	4	12	.250	10½	Frank Baumeister

League disbanded June 5.

Player statistics
Player	Team	Stat	Tot	Player	Team	Stat	Tot
Jake Weimer	Olean	BA	.461	Tom Fleming	Olean	W	6
Bill Price	Olean	Runs	27	Tom Fleming	Olean	Pct	1.000; 6–0
Jake Weimer	Olean	Hits	30				
Jake Weimer	Olean	HR	3				

== 1913 Interstate League ==
=== Cities represented 1913 ===
- Akron, OH: Akron Giants 1913
- Canton, OH: Canton Senators 1913
- Columbus, OH: Columbus Cubs 1913
- Erie, PA: Erie Sailors 1913
- Steubenville, OH: Steubenville Stubs 1913
- Wheeling, WV: Wheeling Stogies 1913
- Youngstown, OH: Youngstown Steelmen 1913
- Zanesville, OH: Zanesville Flood Sufferers 1913

=== Standings & statistics 1913 ===
1913 Interstate League
schedule
President: C.L. Rexford

Team standings	W	L	PCT	GB	Managers
Erie Sailors	57	21	.731	-	Larry Quinlan
Akron Giants	47	32	.595	10½	Johnny Siegle
Youngstown Steelmen	43	33	.566	13	Curley Blount
Columbus Cubs	37	38	.493	18½	Lee Fohl
Steubenville Stubs	31	42	.425	22½	Roy Montgomery
Wheeling Stogies	32	47	.405	25½	Ray Ryan
Canton Senators	29	44	.397	25½	Bade Myers
Zanesville Flood Sufferers	27	46	.370	27½	Marty Hogan

Zanesville folded July 13.
League folded July 21.

Player statistics
Player	Team	Stat	Tot	Player	Team	Stat	Tot
Tom Sheehan	Youngstown	BA	.355	Lou Schettler	Erie	W	14
John Dawson	Erie	Runs	67	Clark Sterzer	Erie	SO	121
Tom Sheehan	Youngstown	Hits	106	Lou Schettler	Erie	Pct	.824; 14-3
Art Watson	Steubenville	HR	6				

== 1914 to 1916 Interstate League ==
=== Cities represented 1914 – 1916 ===
- Bradford, PA: Bradford Drillers 1914–1916
- Erie, PA: Erie Sailors 1916
- Hornell, NY: Hornell Green Sox 1914, Hornell Maple Leafs 1915
- Jamestown, NY: Jamestown Giants 1914, Jamestown Rabbits 1915
- Johnsonburg, PA: Johnsonburg Johnnies 1916
- Olean, NY: Olean Refiners 1914, Olean White Sox 1915–1916
- Ridgway, PA: Ridgway 1916
- St. Marys, PA: St. Marys Saints 1916
- Warren, PA: Warren Bingoes 1914–1915, Warren Warriors (1916)
- Wellsville, NY: Wellsville Rainmakers 1914–1916

=== Standings & statistics 1914-1916 ===
1914 Interstate League
Presidents: Milton A. Jordan / W. Duke Jr.

Team standings	W	L	PCT	GB	Managers
Jamestown Giants	59	40	.596	-	Joe Lohr
Bradford Drillers	59	42	.584	1	Art Goodwin / Duke Servatius
Warren Bingoes	57	45	.559	3½	Bill Webb
Olean Refiners	43	53	.448	14½	Harry Giles / Joe Reynolds
Wellsville Rainmakers	41	60	.406	19	William Clarke / Elmer Bliss
Hornell Green Sox	39	58	.402	19	John O'Keefe / Albert Barrett; Joe Prozeller

Playoff: Jamestown 4 games, Bradford 3.
No individual statistics available.

1915 Interstate League
President: James A. Lindsey

Team standings	W	L	PCT	GB	Managers
Wellsville Rainmakers	54	32	.628	-	Joe Lohr
Olean White Sox	52	30	.634	-	Gus Dundon
Bradford Drillers	42	42	.500	Duke Servatius / Ray Topham	
Hornell Maple Leafs	38	51	.427	14½	Joe Prozeller / Lenny Burrell
Warren Bingoes	33	50	.398	16½	R.W. Archer / George Bell
Jamestown Rabbits	28	42	.400	18.0	Bill Webb

Jamestown folded August 14.
Olean refused to play in the finals against Wellsville. Olean argued all Jamestown's second half games should have been thrown out after folding and Olean should have won both halves. Olean claim was denied and title awarded to Wellsville
Playoff: None held

Player statistics
Player	Team	Stat	Tot	Player	Team	Stat	Tot
Bill Colligan	Olean	BA	.322	Everett Keener	Wellsville	W	14
Bill Colligan	Olean	Runs	62	Lefty Webb	James/Hornell	W	14
Joe Apple	Wellsville	Runs	62	Lefty Webb	James/Hornell	SO	152
John Steinfeldt	Wellsville	Hits	101	Everett Keener	Wellsville	Pct	.778; 14-4
Charlie Moran	Warren	HR	3				

1916 Interstate League
schedule
President: James A. Lindsey

Team standings	W	L	PCT	GB	Managers
Ridgway	56	24	.700	-	Izzy Hoffman
St. Marys Saints	49	30	.620	6½	Curley Blount
Bradford Drillers	45	38	.542	12½	Larry Schlafly
Wellsville Rainmakers	27	48	.360	26½	Joe Lohr
Johnsonburg Johnnies	27	49	.355	27	Thomas Jones
Warren Warriors	24	19	.558	NA	Frank Shaughnessy
Erie Sailors	26	37	.413	NA	Bill Bradley
Olean White Sox	16	25	.390	NA	Gus Dundon

Olean folded July 12.
Warren folded August 4; none of its second half games (6-9) were counted.
Erie folded August 9, Games thrown out: Wins: Warren 6, Wellsville 3, Bradford 2, Erie 2, St. Marys 1, Johnsonburg 1; Losses: Warren 9, Wellsville 4, St. Marys 1.

Player statistics
Player	Team	Stat	Tot	Player	Team	Stat	Tot
Jacob Jennis	Bradford	BA	.357	John Verbout	St. Marys	W	18
Sam McConnell	Ridgway	Runs	64	Al Braithwood	Bradford	So	133
Jim McCabe	Ridgway	Hits	95	Bill Chapelle	Wells/Ridg	Pct	.800; 12-3
John Gilmore	Warr/St.Ma/Wells	HR	4				
Frank Gleich	Erie	HR	4				

== 1932 Interstate League ==
=== Cities represented 1932 ===
- Lancaster, Pennsylvania: Lancaster Red Sox 1932
- Norristown, Pennsylvania: Norristown 1932
- Pottstown, Pennsylvania: Pottstown Legionaires 1932
- Slatington, Pennsylvania: Slatington Dukes 1932
- St. Clair, Pennsylvania: St. Clair Saints 1932
- Stroudsburg, Pennsylvania: Stroudsburg Poconos 1932
- Tamaqua, Pennsylvania: Tamaqua Dukes 1932
- Washington, New Jersey: Washington Potomacs 1932

=== Standings & statistics 1932 ===
1932 Interstate League
President: William J. Willenbecher

Team standings	W	L	PCT	GB	Managers
Stroudsburg Poconos	19	7	.731	-	Ed Murphy
Pottstown Legionaires	18	8	.692	1	Earl Potteiger
Norristown / St. Clair Saints	11	10	.524	8½	Steve Yerkes
Tamaqua Dukes / Slatington Dukes	10	16	.385	9	Lee Strait
Washington Potomacs	9	17	.346	9	Edward Neff
Lancaster Red Sox	7	16	.304	10½	Bud Shaw / Jimmy Sheckard; Otto Sandberger

Pottstown folded in June, reorganized and re-formed June 17; disbanded again causing the league to fold; Norristown (2-4) moved to St. Clair May 28; St. Clair folded June 12; Tamaqua (8-12) moved to Slatington June 8; Lancaster folded June 17.
League disbanded June 20.

Player statistics
Player	Team	Stat	Tot	Player	Team	Stat	Tot
Dom Dallessandro	Norris/St.Cla	BA	.418	Ed Cole	Stroudsburg	W	7
Mickey Haslin	Stroudsburg	BA	.418	Matt Ramsey	Pottstown	W	7
Frank DeManicore	Stroudsburg	Runs	39	Jack Crimmins	Tama/Slating	SO	47
Mickey Haslin	Stroudsburg	Hits	48	Matt Ramsey	Pottstown	Pct	.875; 7-1
Frank DeManicore	Stroudsburg	HR	7				
Mickey Haslin	Stroudsburg	HR	7				
Paul Piontek	Stroudsburg	HR	7				
Paul Piontek	Stroudsburg	RBI	37				

== 1939–1952 ==
Interstate League
- Sport: Baseball
- Founded: 1939
- First season: 1939
- Folded: 1952
- No. of teams: 4 (1939); 8 (1940–1941) (1946–1952); 6 (1942–1945)
- Country: United States
- Last champion: Hagerstown Braves
- Most titles: Wilmington Blue Rocks (4); Lancaster Red Roses (4)
- Website: None

The longest tenured version of the Interstate League was the last incarnation, which played in the Mid-Atlantic states from 1939 through 1952, and was one of the few mid-level minor leagues to operate continuously during the World War II period.

This circuit, which began as Class C and was upgraded to Class B in 1940, typically had teams in Allentown, Harrisburg, Lancaster and Sunbury, all in Pennsylvania; Hagerstown, Maryland; Trenton, New Jersey; and Wilmington, Delaware. Its final champion was the Hagerstown Braves, a Boston Braves affiliate. That season, the York White Roses led the league in attendance, attracting over 78,000 fans.

=== Cities/Teams/Years ===
Cities represented	Teams	Major League Affiliate	Year(s)
Allentown, Pennsylvania	Allentown Dukes	Boston Braves	1939
Allentown, Pennsylvania	Allentown Fleetwings	St. Louis Cardinals	1940
Allentown, Pennsylvania	Allentown Wings	Philadelphia Phillies (1941); St. Louis Cardinals (1942–43)	1941–43
Allentown, Pennsylvania	Allentown Cardinals	St. Louis Cardinals	1944–52
Bridgeport, Connecticut	Bridgeport Bees	Boston Braves	1941
Hagerstown, Maryland	Hagerstown Owls	Detroit Tigers (1941–44) (1947–48); Chicago Cubs (1945–46); Washington Senators (1949)	1941–49
Hagerstown, Maryland	Hagerstown Braves	Boston Braves	1950–52
Harrisburg, Pennsylvania	Harrisburg Senators	Pittsburgh Pirates (1941–42); Cleveland Indians (1946–51); Philadelphia Athletics (1952)	1940–42, 1946–52
Hazleton, Pennsylvania	Hazleton Mountaineers	Unaffiliated	1939–40
Lancaster, Pennsylvania	Lancaster Red Roses	Philadelphia Athletics (1944–47); Brooklyn Dodgers (1948–52)	1940–52
Reading, Pennsylvania	Reading Chicks	Unaffiliated	1940
Reading, Pennsylvania	Reading Brooks	Brooklyn Dodgers	1941
Salisbury, Maryland	Salisbury Athletics	Philadelphia Athletics	1951
Salisbury, Maryland	Salisbury Reds	Cincinnati Reds	1952
Sunbury, Pennsylvania	Sunbury Senators	Unaffiliated	1939
Sunbury, Pennsylvania	Sunbury Indians	Unaffiliated	1940
Sunbury, Pennsylvania	Sunbury Yankees	New York Yankees	1946–47
Sunbury, Pennsylvania	Sunbury Reds	Cincinnati Reds	1948–49
Sunbury, Pennsylvania	Sunbury Athletics	Philadelphia Athletics	1950
Sunbury, Pennsylvania	Sunbury Giants	New York Giants	1951–52
Trenton, New Jersey	Trenton Senators	Unaffiliated	1939–41
Trenton, New Jersey	Trenton Packers	Philadelphia Phillies (1942–43); Brooklyn Dodgers (1944)	1942–44
Trenton, New Jersey	Trenton Spartans	Brooklyn Dodgers	1945
Trenton, New Jersey	Trenton Giants	New York Giants	1946–50
Wilmington, Delaware	Wilmington Blue Rocks	Philadelphia Athletics (1940–43); Philadelphia Phillies (1944–52)	1940–52
York, Pennsylvania	York Bees	Boston Braves	1940
York, Pennsylvania	York White Roses	Pittsburgh Pirates (1943–50); St. Louis Browns (1952)	1943–52

=== League champions ===
Season	Interstate League champion	Interstate League runner-up	Other postseason participants
1939	Allentown Dukes	Sunbury Senators	Trenton Senators
1940	Lancaster Red Roses	Reading Chicks	Trenton Senators; Wilmington Blue Rocks
1941	Harrisburg Senators	Trenton Senators	Hagerstown Owls; Reading Brooks
1942	Wilmington Blue Rocks	Hagerstown Owls	Harrisburg Senators; Allentown Wings
1943	Lancaster Red Roses	York White Roses	Hagerstown Owls; Wilmington Blue Rocks
1944	Lancaster Red Roses	Allentown Cardinals	Wilmington Blue Rocks; York White Roses
1945	Lancaster Red Roses	Allentown Cardinals	Trenton Spartans; Wilmington Blue Rocks
1946	Harrisburg Senators	Wilmington Blue Rocks	Hagerstown Owls; Allentown Cardinals
1947	Wilmington Blue Rocks	Allentown Cardinals	Trenton Giants; Harrisburg Senators
1948	Trenton Giants	York White Roses	Wilmington Blue Rocks, Sunbury Reds
1949	Trenton Giants	Harrisburg Senators	Allentown Cardinals; Wilmington Blue Rocks
1950	Wilmington Blue Rocks	Hagerstown Braves	Harrisburg Senators; Trenton Giants
1951	Wilmington Blue Rocks	Sunbury Giants	Hagerstown Braves; Allentown Cardinals
1952	Hagerstown Braves	Lancaster Red Roses	York White Roses, Allentown Cardinals

== Individual records ==
=== Hitting ===
- Games: 142, Steve Flipowicz, Sunbury (1947)
- Batting Average: .428, Woody Wheaton, Hazelton (1939)
- At Bats: 593, Robert Mays, Hagerstown (1943)
- Runs: 128, Nellie Fox, Lancaster (1945)
  128, Richard Burgett, Allentown (1946)
- Hits: 220, George Kell, Lancaster (1943)
- Runs Batted In: 144, Edward Sanicki, Wilmington (1946)
- Doubles: 52, Bob Maier, Hagerstown (1943)
- Triples: 24, Harold Bamberger, Trenton (1947)
  24, Charley Neal, Lancaster (1951)
- Home Runs: 37, Edward Sanicki, Wilmington (1947)
- Extra Base Hits: 73, John Capra, Allentown (1944)
- Total Bases: 320, Del Ennis, Trenton (1943)
- Consecutive Game Hitting Streak: 22, Harold Nerino, Sunbury (1940)
  22, Bill Cox, Harrisburg (1941)
  22, Edward Nowak, Hagerstown (1945)
- Sacrifices: 24, Harvey Johnson, Harrisburg (1941)
- Stolen Bases: 47, Joseph Schmidt, Wilmington (1946)
- Walks: 130, Guy Glaser, Wilmington (1945)
- Hit By Pitch: 23, Nellie Fox, Lancaster (1945)
- Struck Out: 123, Peyton Rambin, Trenton (1949)

=== Pitching ===
- Games: 49, George Eyrich, Wilmington (1948)
- Complete Games: 29, Charles Bowles, Lancaster (1943)
  29, Norman Shope, York (1944)
- Wins: 24, Daniel Lewandowski, Allentown (1951)
- Losses: 21, Wilson Emmerick, Allentown (1943)
- Best Percentage: .880 (22-3), Anderson Bush, Hagerstown (1951)
- Earned Run Average: 1.44, Royce Lint, Harrisburg (1942)
- Innings Pitched: 260, Charles Miller, Hagerstown (1943)
- Win Streak: 13, Woody Wheaton, Lancaster (1943)
- Shutouts: 7, John Burrows, Wilmington (1942),
- Strikeouts: 278, Andy Tomasic, Trenton (1947)
- Bases on Balls: 165, Dick Libby, Sunbury (1948)
- Wild Pitches: 19, Joseph Slotter, Hagerstown (1944)

=== No-hitters ===
Year	Date	Pitcher	Team	Opposition	Score	Notes
1940	July 2	Don Kepler	Sunbury	York	6-0	7 innings
1942	August 24	Jack Casey	Trenton	Hagerstown	2-3	lost game
1943	July 1	Steve Gerkin	Lancaster	Trenton	4-0	7 innings
1944	June 25	Hal Kelleher	Trenton	York	6-0	7 innings
1946	June 10	Whitey Konikowski	Trenton	Harrisburg	4-0	7 innings
1949	May 7	Tony West	Trenton	Westbury	11-0	
1950	June 11	Joe Micciche	Trenton	Harrisburg	9-0	
1950	August 25	Tony Segzda	York	Sunbury	6-0	
1951	April 28	Keith Kelley	Lancaster	Wilmington	10-0	
1951	June 14	William Minton	Salisbury	Harrisburg	0-2	lost game
1951	July 18	Tom Casagrande	Wilimington	York	0-1	11 innings; lost game
1951	July 28	Ernest Nichols	Lancaster	Salisbury	6-2	
1951	August 20	Tom Casagrande	Wilmington	Harrisburg	4-0	7 innings
1952	June 5	Bob Berresford	Harrisburg	Wilmington	1-0	
1952	August 6	Doug Gostlin	Lancaster	Sunbury	1-0	
