= Oil City Cubs =

Former minor league baseball team in Pennsylvania, US

- 1907–1908; (1906–1908); Oil City, Pennsylvania

Minor league affiliations
- Class: Class D (1906–1908)
- League: Interstate League (1906–1908)

Major league affiliations
- Team: None

Minor league titles
- League titles (1): 1907
- Conference titles (1): 1907

Team data
- Name: Oil City-Jamestown Oseejays (1906); Oil City Cubs (1907–1908)
- Ballpark: Sedwick Grounds (1906–1908)

The Oil City Cubs were a minor league baseball team based in Oil City, Pennsylvania. From 1906 to 1908, Oil City teams played as members of the Class D level Interstate League, winning the 1907 league championship. The 1906 team played as the "Oil City-Jamestown Oseejays." Oil City hosted home minor league games at the Sedwick Grounds. The 1898 and 1941 Oil City Oilers teams preceded and succeeded the Interstate League Oil City teams.

== History ==
The Oil City Interstate league teams were preceded in minor league play by the 1898 Oil City Oilers, who finished their third season of play as members of the Independent level Iron and Oil League.

In 1906, Oil City resumed minor league play, when the Oil City-Jamestown "Oseejays" became members of the eight–team Class D level Interstate League, playing in partnership with regional neighbor Jamestown, New York for the season. The Bradford Drillers, DuBois Miners, Erie Sailors, Hornell Pigmies, Kane Mountaineers, Olean Refiners and Punxsutawney Policemen teams joined Oil City in beginning league play on May 14, 1906.

Oil City and the other Interstate League franchises operated with a team salary cap of $750 per month for the total roster. The league rules required the host team to guarantee the visiting team $50.00 per game, with a rain guarantee of $25.00. On Saturdays and holidays, the home team's gate receipts were to be divided equally by both teams.

In their first season of Interstate League play, the Oil City-Jamestown Oseejays finished last in the Interstate League final standings. Finishing with a record of 44–69, the eighth place Oseejays were managed by Alfred Lawson. In the final standings, Oil City-Johnstown finished 24½ games behind the first place Erie Fisherman.

In 1907, Oil City continued minor league play, as the Oil City "Cubs." The Bradford Drillers, Franklin Millionaires, DuBois Miners, Erie Fishermen, Kane Mountaineers, Olean Oleaners and Punxsutawney Policemen teams joined the Cubs in continuing Interstate League play, with the schedule beginning on May 15, 1907 and many changes to occur during the upcoming season.

In their second season of Interstate League play, Oil City won the 1907 league championship in unique circumstances. In the regular season, the Oil City Cubs placed fourth overall, with three of the eight league teams folding before completing the season. Kane disbanded on July 16; Olean disbanded on July 18; Punxsutawney disbanded on August 3 and DuBois disbanded August 5. The league played a third season, August 7 through September 8, won by Bradford. Oil City was declared the first half champion because DuBois had disbanded. The team was also referred to as the "Oilers." Oil City ended their season with a record of 54–57, as Jim Collopy and C.L. Rexford served as managers. The Cubs finished 8.0 games behind first place Erie in the final regular season overall standings. In the Playoff, Oil City defeated Bradford four games to three to claim the championship. Franklin and the other teams of the Interstate League were plagued by bad weather and corresponding financial troubles in 1907, with Erie being the only league franchise without debt. Jake Weimer, who played for DuBois and then Oil City, won the Interstate League batting title with a .338 average. Oil City teammate Ben Jewell led the league with 66 runs scored and Earl Syles had 108 total hits, most in the league. On the mound, Jiggs Parson had a 15-5 pitching record to lead the league.

Oil City continued Interstate League play in 1908, before the league folded during the season. After beginning play on May 13, 1908, the league folded on June 7, 1908. The Oil City Cubs ended their 1908 season with a record of 6–13, placing fifth in the overall Interstate League standings. O.C. Rexford served as the Oil City manager, as the team ended the season 10.0 games behind the first place Olean Candidates.

Oil City next hosted minor league baseball, when the 1941 Oil City Oilers resumed play, becoming members of the Class D level Pennsylvania State Association.

== The ballpark ==
The Oil City teams hosted Interstate League home games at the Sedwick Grounds.

== Timeline ==
Year(s)	# Yrs.	Team	Level	League	Ballpark
1906	1	Oil City-Jamestown Oseejays	Class D	Interstate League	Sedwick Grounds
1907–1908	2	Oil City Cubs	Class D	Interstate League	Sedwick Grounds

== Year–by–year records ==
Year	Record	Finish	Manager	Playoffs/notes
1906	44–69	8th	Alfred Lawson	No playoffs held
1907	54–57	4th	Jim Collopy / C.L. Rexford	League champions
1908	6–13	5th	C.L. Rexford	League folded June 7

== Notable alumni ==
- Alfred Lawson (1906, MGR)
- Jiggs Parson (1907)
- Jake Weimer (1907)

== See also ==
- Oil City Cubs players
