= Coudersport Giants =

- 1904–1905; Coudersport, Pennsylvania

Minor league affiliations
- Class: Independent (1904); Class D (1905)
- League: Southern Tier League (1904); Interstate League (1905)

Major league affiliations
- Team: None

Minor league titles
- League titles (1): 1905

Team data
- Name: Coudersport (1904); Coudersport Giants (1905)
- Ballpark: Mitchell Park

The Coudersport Giants were a minor league baseball team based in Coudersport, Pennsylvania. In 1905, the Giants played as members of the Class D level Interstate League, winning the league championship in their final season of play. Previously hosting the 1904 Coudersport minor league team of the independent Southern Tier League, Coudersport played home minor league games at Morgan Park.

== History ==
In 1904, Coudersport began minor league play as members of the independent Southern Tier League. The team had no official nickname, common in the era, as Charles Eichelberger managed the Coudersport team. Playing with Coudersport in the league were the Addison White Sox, Corning White Ponies, Elmira, Hornellsville Maple Cities, Penn Yan Grape Pickers and Wellsville Oil Drillers teams. The 1904 official Southern Tier League standings and statistics are unknown, but newspaper accounts had the Coudersport team in last place with a 9–19 record on August 21, 1904.

In 1905, Coudersport continued minor league play, with the Coudersport "Giants" becoming members of the six–team Class D level Interstate League. The Bradford Drillers, Erie Fishermen, Jamestown Hill Climbers, Kane Mountaineers and Olean Refiners teams joined the Giants in beginning league play of April 25, 1905. Local newspapers used the "Giants" nickname for the team.

The Coudersport Giants won the 1905 Interstate League championship. The Giants ended the 1905 season with a record of 59–38, finishing first in the Interstate League standings. With Harry Knight and John Lawley serving as managers, Coudersport finished 1.0 game ahead of the second place Erie Fisherman (58–39). The Olean Refiners (54–50), Bradford Drillers (46–54), Kane Mountaineers (40–56) and Jamestown Hill Climbers/DuBois Miners (40–60) followed in the standings.

Future major league players Rube Kroh and Herbie Moran played for the Coudersport Giants. Moran was a Coudersport native, playing his first season of professional baseball.

Despite winning the league championship in 1905, Coudersport did not return to minor league play in 1906. The Interstate League continued play in 1906, when it expanded to eight teams, but without the Coudersport franchise. The Erie Sailors, Oil City-Jamestown Oseejays and Punxsutawney Policemen were the new franchises in the 1906 Interstate League. Coudersport, Pennsylvania has not hosted another minor league team.

== The ballpark ==
Coudersport hosted home minor league games at Mitchell Park. Still in use today as a public park, Mitchell Park is located on Park Avenue in Cloudersport.

== Timeline ==
Year(s)	# Yrs.	Team	Level	League	Ballpark
1904	1	Coudersport	Class D	Southern Tier League	Mitchell Park
1905	1	Coudersport Giants	Class D	Interstate League	Mitchell Park

== Year–by–year record ==
Year	Record	Finish	Manager	Playoffs/notes
1904	9–19	6th	Charles Eichelberger	Record on Aug 21
1905	59–38	1st	Harry Knight / John Lawley	No playoffs held League champions

== Notable alumni ==
- Rube Kroh (1905)
- Herbie Moran (1904-1905)
- Coudersport Giants players
