= Bradford Drillers =

Minor league baseball team based in Bradford, Pennsylvania

- 1905–1916; (1905–1908, 1914–1916); Bradford, Pennsylvania

Minor league affiliations
- Class: Class D (1905–1908, 1914–1916)
- League: Interstate League (1905–1908, 1914–1916)

Major league affiliations
- Team: None

Minor league titles
- League titles (0): None
- Wild card berths (1): 1914

Team data
- Name: Bradford Drillers (1905–1908, 1914–1916)
- Ballpark: Edgar Thompson Park (1905–1908, 1914–1916)

The Bradford Drillers were a minor league baseball team based in Bradford, Pennsylvania. From 1905 to 1908 and again from 1914 to 1916, the Drillers played exclusively as members of the Class D level Interstate League. While the team did not win a league title, the Drillers finished in second or third place in six of seven seasons in league play. Bradford hosted home minor league games at Edgar Thompson Park. The "Drillers" nickname corresponds to the oil industry in region in the era of the team.

== History ==
=== Interstate League 1905 to 1908 ===
The 1887, the "Bradford" team first played minor league baseball as members of the Pennsylvania State Association. The Drillers were immediately preceded in minor league play by the 1898 "Bradford" Pirates" who played the season as members of the Iron and Oil League.

In 1905, Bradford resumed hosting minor league play, when the Bradford "Drillers" became members of the reformed six–team Class D level Interstate League. The Coudersport Giants, Erie Fishermen, Jamestown Hill Climbers, Kane Mountaineers and Olean Refiners teams joined Bradford in beginning league play on April 25, 1905.

Interstate League teams, Bradford included, had a salary cap of $750 per team per month. The league required the home team to pay the visiting team $50.00 per game for weekday games, with a rain guarantee of $25.00. On Saturdays and holidays, the gate receipts were divided equally by between teams.

The "Drillers" nickname corresponds to the oil industry in the region. In 1881, Oil in Bradford supplied 83% of all oil produced in the United States. Today, the city is home to the Penn Brad Oil Museum, paying tribute to the oil industry in the city and region. The city remains home to the American Refining Group (formerly Kendall and the Bradford Oil Refinery), founded in 1881. American Refining Group is the oldest continuously operating refinery in the United States.

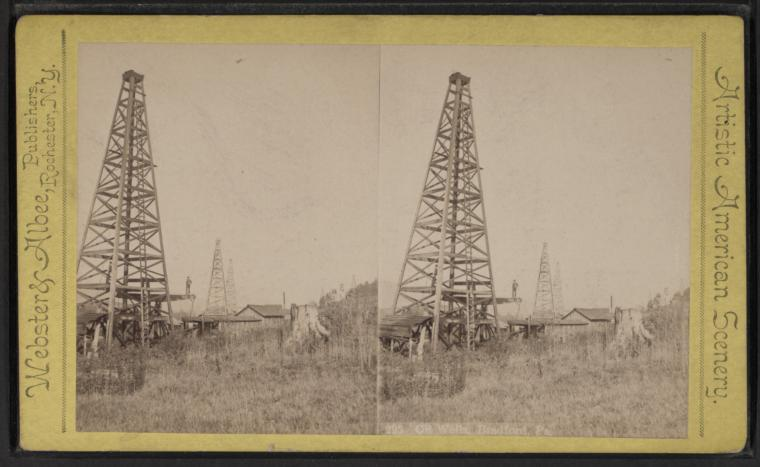
(1910) Oil wells. Bradford, Pennsylvania.

In their first season of play, the Drillers placed fourth in the 1905 Interstate League standings. Completing the season with an overall record of 46–54, Bradford finished 14.5 games behind the first place Coudersport Giants, with William Leary and Frederick Paige serving as managers. In the final league standings, the Coudersport Giants (59–38) finished 1.0 game ahead of the second place Erie Fisherman (58–39), followed by The Olean Refiners (54–50), Bradford Drillers (46–54), Kane Mountaineers (40–56) and Jamestown Hill Climbers/DuBois Miners (40–60).

The Drillers continued Class D level Interstate League play in 1906. Bradford ended the season in third place in the eight–team league, as the league added the Franklin Millionaires and Hornell Pigmies as expansion teams. Finishing with a record of 61–53, the Drillers were managed by Tom News. In the final standings, Bradford finished 8.0 games behind the first place Erie Fisherman.

The 1907 Bradford Drillers placed second in the Interstate League final standings, as the league reduced teams during the season. The Drillers ended the season with a record of 63–54 as Eddie Foster served as manager. Bradford ended the season 2.0 games behind the first place Erie Sailors. Bradford and their partner teams of the Interstate League were plagued by bad weather and the resulting financial situation, with four teams folding. Erie was the only league franchise not in debt. Bradford, Erie, Franklin and Oil City continued were able to complete the 1907 league season as a four-team league, with Erie ending the season with the best record. Bradford teammates Doc Hazleton and Bill Kirwin both won 16 games to lead the Interstate League.

In 1908, Bradford placed third in a shortened Interstate League season, as the league resumed play as a six-team league. On June 5, 1908, the Interstate League folded. With a record of 12–8, playing under manager George Rinderknecht, Bradford finished 3.5 games behind the first place Olean Candidates. The league did not resume play in the 1909 season.

=== Interstate League 1914 to 1916 ===
In 1914, the Interstate League reformed. The Bradford franchise rejoined the league and "Drillers" resumed membership in the six-team, Class D level league. The Hornell Green Sox, Jamestown Giants, Olean Refiners, Warren Bingoes and Wellsville Rainmakers teams joined Bradford in beginning the league schedule on May 22, 1914.

In returning to league play, the Drillers ended the Class D level Interstate League season in second place in the six–team league and played in the league Finals. With a regular season record of 59–42, Bradford was managed by Art Goodwin and Duke Servatius. In the final regular season standings, the Drillers finished just 1.0 game behind the first place Jamestown Giants (59-40). The teams then met in playoff, which was won by Jamestown, defeating Bradford 4 games to 3.

In 1915, the Drillers continued Class D level Interstate League play and finished in third place behind two teams who had a contentious tie in the league final standings. The Drillers ended the season with a 42–42 record playing under managers Duke Servatius and Ray Topham. The Olean White Sox with a 52–30 record (.634) ended the season in a first-place statistical tie with the Wellsville Rainmakers, who finished 54–32 (.628). Wellsville had captured the second half title of the split season schedule and Olean had captured the first half title. Drillers manager Duke Servatius ended the season as manager of Olean. Following the conclusion of the regular season, Olean refused to play in a playoff with Wellsville and the title was awarded to Wellsville.

In their final season of Interstate League play, the league expanded to eight-teams to begin the season, with the Drillers placing third, after three teams did not complete the season. Bradford ended the season with a record of 45–38. Larry Schlafly was the Bradford manager, as the Drillers finished 12.0 games behind the first place Ridgway team. Jacob Jennis of Bradford won the league batting title, hitting .357. Teammate Al Braithwood had 133 strikeouts to lead the league pitchers.

The Interstate League did not return to play in 1917. Bradford next hosted minor league baseball over two decades later, with the 1939 Bradford Bees, who began play as members of the Class D level Pennsylvania–Ontario–New York League.

== The ballpark ==
The Bradford Drillers teams hosted home Interstate League minor league games at Edgar Thompson Park.

== Timeline ==
Year(s)	# Yrs.	Team	Level	League	Ballpark
1905–1908	4	Bradford Drillers	Class D	Interstate League	Edgar Thompson Park
1914–1916	3	Bradford Drillers	Class D	Interstate League	Edgar Thompson Park

== Year–by–year records ==
Year	Record	Finish	Manager	Playoffs/notes
1905	46–54	4th	William Leary / Frederick Paige	No playoffs held
1906	61–53	3rd	Tom News	No playoffs held
1907	63–54	2nd	Eddie Foster	No playoffs held
1908	12–8	3rd	George Rinderknecht	League folded June 5
1914	59–42	2nd	Art Goodwin / Duke Servatius	Lost in finals
1915	42–42	3rd	Duke Servatius / Ray Topham	No playoffs held
1916	45–38	3rd	Larry Schlafly	No playoffs held

== Notable alumni ==
- Petie Behan (1916)
- Al Braithwood (1916)
- Mickey Corcoran (1905)
- Harry Curtis (1906–1907)
- Eddie Foster (1907, MGR)
- Jack Fox (1914)
- Art Goodwin (1914, MGR)
- Charlie Johnson (1906)
- Gene Krapp (1916)
- Gene Madden (1908)
- Danny Mahoney (1914)
- Bill Mundy (1916)
- Bobby Rothermel (1907)
- Larry Schlafly (1916, MGR)
- Frank Shaughnessy (1916)
- Huyler Westervelt (1905)
- Del Young (1916)

== See also ==
- Bradford Drillers players
