= St. Marys Saints (baseball) =

- 1916; St. Marys, Pennsylvania

Minor league affiliations
- Class: Class D (1916)
- League: Interstate League (1916)

Major league affiliations
- Team: None

Minor league titles
- League titles (0): None

Team data
- Name: St. Marys Saints (1916)
- Ballpark: Memorial Park (1916)

The St. Marys Saints were a minor league baseball team based in St. Marys, Pennsylvania. In 1916, the Saints played as members of the eight-team Class D level Interstate League, finishing in second place before the league folded following the season. St. Marys hosted home minor league games at Memorial Park.

== History ==
St. Marys began minor league play in 1916, when the St. Marys "Saints" began play as a member of the Interstate League, a Class D level minor league. The league began play on May 19, 1916, with the Bradford Drillers, Erie Sailors, Johnsonburg Johnnies, Olean White Sox, Ridgway, Warren Warriors and Wellsville Rainmakers teams joining St. Marys in league play to begin the season.

The Interstate League continued play in 1916, as the league expanded to eight teams to begin the season. The league ended the season with five teams after the Erie Sailors, Olean White Sox and Warren Bingoes teams folded during the season. St. Marys had an overall regular season record of 49–30, playing the season under manager Curley Blount. The Saints placed second and ended the season 6.5 games behind the first place Ridgway team. No playoffs were held as Ridgeway won both halves of the split season schedule. Pitcher John Verbout of St. Marys won 18 games to lead the Interstate League.

St. Marys players Al Boucher, Katsy Keifer and Johnny Miljus advanced to the major leagues in their careers.

The Interstate League did not return to play in 1917. The league resumed play in the region in 1932 without a St. Marys franchise. St. Marys has not hosted another minor league team.

== The ballpark ==
The St. Marys Saints hosted home minor league games at Memorial Park. Memorial Park is still in use today as a public park with amenities. The park is located on Wolfel Avenue in St. Marys.

== Year–by–year record ==
Year	Record	Finish	Manager	Playoffs/notes
1916	49–30	2nd	Curley Blount	No playoffs held

== Notable alumni ==
- Al Boucher (1916)
- Katsy Keifer (1916)
- Johnny Miljus (1916)

== See also ==
St. Marys Saints players
