= Addison White Sox =

- 1904–1905; Addison, New York

Minor league affiliations
- Class: Independent (1904–1905)
- League: Southern Tier League (1904–1905)

Major league affiliations
- Team: None

Minor league titles
- League titles (1): 1904

Team data
- Name: Addison White Sox (1904); Addison-Wellsville Tobacco Strippers (1905)
- Ballpark: Unknown (1904–1905)

The Addison White Sox were a minor league baseball team based in Addison, New York. In 1904 and 1905, Addison based teams played as members of the Independent level Southern Tier League.

In 1905, Addison partnered with Wellsville, New York, playing the season as the "Addison-Wellsville Tobacco Strippers".

== History ==
The 1904 Addison White Sox began minor league play, as Addison became charter members of the Southern Tier League. The league formed as Independent level minor league, with the Corning White Ponies, Coudersport, Elmira, Hornellsville Maple Cities, Penn Yan Grape Pickers and Wellsville Oil Drillers teams joining Addison as charter members. League standings in some references list Hornellsville as the first place team, but August 20 newspaper accounts show Addison in first place with a 22–11 record and Harnellsville in fifth place with a 12–22 record. The league was also referred to as the "Southern Tier Association." The 1904 Addison manager was Bill Heine.

The 1905 Southern Tier League continued play as a four–team Independent league. The four teams included the Addison-Wellsville Tobacco Strippers, playing under returning manager Bill Hiene, as Addison partnered with neighboring Wellsville, New York. The Corning Glassblowers, Elmira and Hornellsville Blue Birds completed the league teams. The 1905 standings and statistics are unknown.

The Southern Tier League permanently folded as a minor league after the 1905 season. A league with the same name later played as a semi–professional league.

Addison, New York has not hosted another minor league nor collegiate summer baseball team.

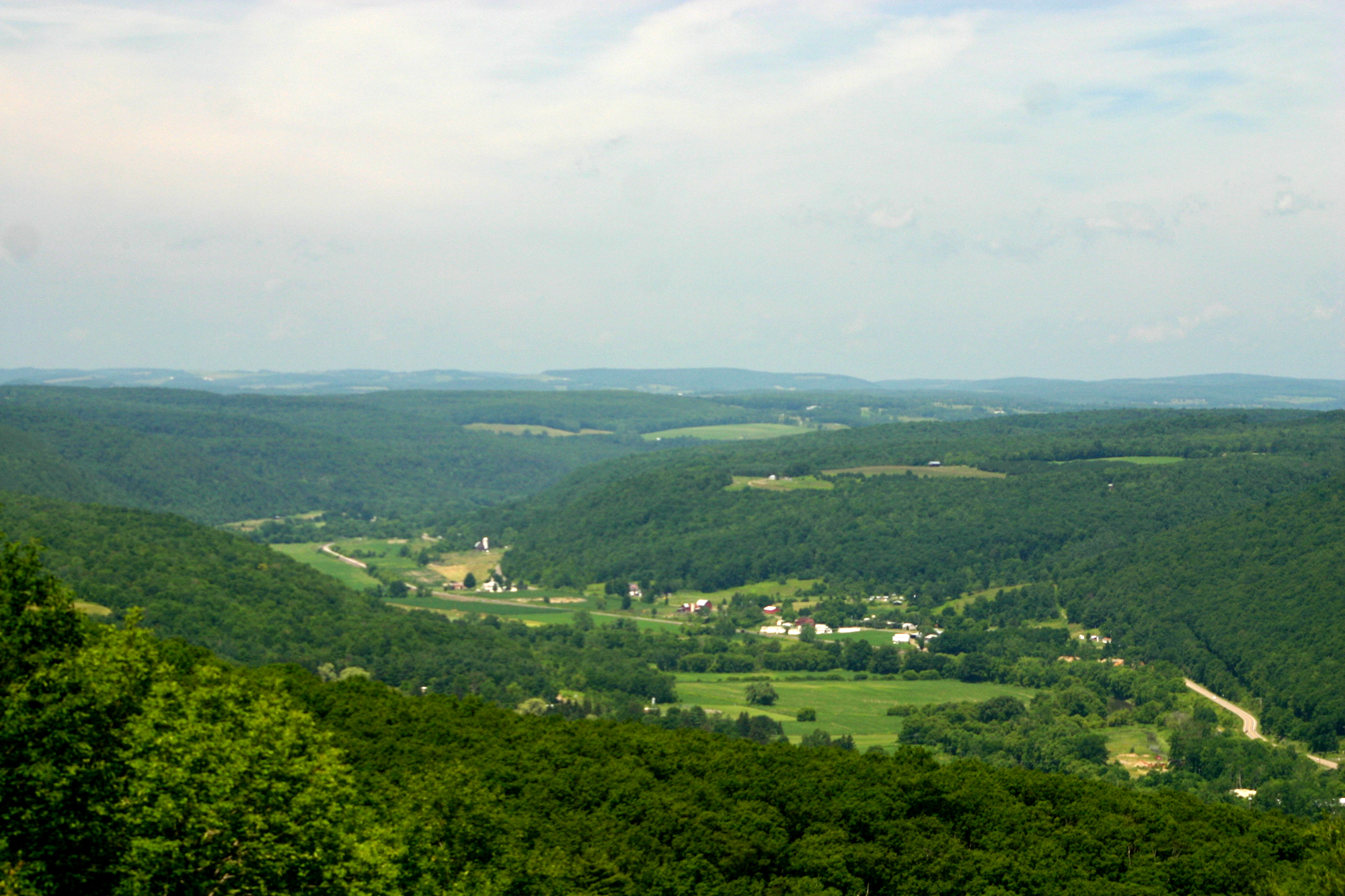
Canisteo River Valley from Pinnacle State Park, Addison, New York

== The ballpark ==
The name of the Addison minor league home ballpark is not directly referenced.

== Timeline ==
Year(s)	# Yrs.	Team	Level	League
1904	1	Addison White Sox	Independent	Southern Tier League
1905	1	Addison-Wellsville Tobacco Strippers	Independent	Southern Tier League

== Year–by–year records ==
Year	Record	Finish	Manager	Playoffs/notes
1904	22–11	1st*	Bill Heine	August 20 standings
1905	00–00	NA	Bill Heine	1905 standings unknown

== Notable alumni ==
- Lee DeMontreville (1904)
- Bob Dresser (1905)
- Gene Good (1905)
- Lew Groh (1904)
- Leo Hafford (1905)
- Bill Mack (1904–1905)
- Red Murray (1904) 1909 NL Home Run leader

== See also ==
Addison White Sox players
Addison-Wellsville Tobacco Strippers players
