= Franklin Millionaires =

- 1907–1908; Franklin, Pennsylvania

Minor league affiliations
- Class: Class D (1907–1908)
- League: Interstate League (1907–1908)

Major league affiliations
- Team: None

Minor league titles
- League titles (0): None

Team data
- Name: Franklin Millionaires (1907–1908)
- Ballpark: Unknown (1907–1908)

The Franklin Millionaires were a minor league baseball team based in Franklin, Pennsylvania. In 1907 and 1908, the Millionaires played as members of the Class D level Interstate League. Baseball Hall of Fame member Joe McCarthy played for the 1907 Franklin Millionaires.

== History ==
The Franklin "Millionaires" were preceded in minor league play by the 1895 Franklin "Braves" team who won the championship of the Class C level Iron and Oil League in the one season of league play.

In 1907, Franklin resumed minor league play, with the Franklin "Millionaires" becoming members of the eight–team Class D level Interstate League. The Bradford Drillers, DuBois Miners, Erie Fishermen, Kane Mountaineers, Oil City Cubs, Olean Refiners and Punxsutawney Policemen teams joined Franklin in beginning league play on May 15, 1907.

Franklin and the other Interstate League teams had a salary cap of $750 per month. The league required the host team guarantee a visiting team $50.00 per game, with a rain guarantee of $25.00. On Saturdays and holidays, the gate receipts were to be divided equally by both teams.

In their first season of Interstate League play, the Franklin Millionaires placed third as three of the eight league teams folded before completing the season. Franklin ended their season with a record of 51–52, as L.L. Jacklin and George Rindernecht served as managers. The Millionaires finished 7.0 games behind first place Erie in the final standings. Franklin and the other teams of the Interstate League were plagued by bad weather and corresponding financial troubles in 1907, with Erie being the only league franchise without debt.

At age 20, Baseball Hall of Fame member Joe McCarthy played for the 1907 Millionaires in his first professional season. McCarthy hit .314 for Franklin. McCarthy recalled the players dressing in a hotel and taking a trolley to the ballpark before Franklin home games.

The Millionaires continued Interstate League play in 1908, before the league folded during the season. After beginning play on May 13, 1908, the league folded on June 7, 1908. Franklin ended their 1908 season with a record of 6–12, placing fourth in the overall Interstate League standings. Billy Smith served as the Millionaires' manager, as Franklin ended the season 9.5 games behind the first place Olean Candidates.

The Interstate League folded following the 1908 season, before resuming play in 1913 without a Franklin Franchise. Franklin has not hosted another minor league team.

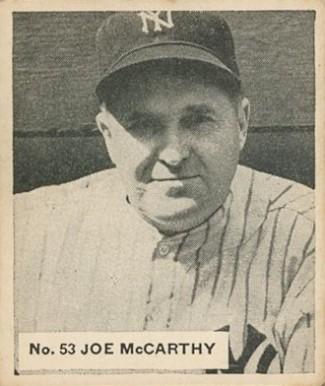
1936 Goudey Joe McCarthy

== The ballpark ==
The name of the Franklin Millionaires' home ballpark is not known.

== Timeline ==
Year(s)	# Yrs.	Team	Level	League
1907–1908	2	Franklin Millionaires	Class D	Interstate League

== Year–by–year records ==
Year	Record	Finish	Manager	Playoffs/notes
1907	51–52	3rd	L. L. Jacklin / George Rindernecht	No playoffs held
1908	6–12	4th	Billy Smith	League folded June 7

== Notable alumni ==
- Joe McCarthy (1907), Inducted to Baseball Hall of Fame 1956
- Dave Zearfoss (1908)
- Franklin Millionaires players
