= Punxsutawney Policemen =

- 1906–1907; Punxsutawney, Pennsylvania

Minor league affiliations
- Class: Class D (1906–1907)
- League: Interstate League (1906–1907)

Major league affiliations
- Team: None

Minor league titles
- League titles (0): None

Team data
- Name: Punxsutawney Policemen (1906–1907)
- Ballpark: Punxsutawney Diamond (1906–1907)

The Punxsutawney Policemen were a minor league baseball team based in Punxsutawney, Pennsylvania. In 1906 and 1907, the "Policemen" played as members of the Class D level Interstate League, before folding during the 1907 season. Punxsutawney hosted minor league home games at the Punxsutawney Diamond.

== History ==
Punxsutawney hosted semi–pro teams prior to beginning full minor league play. In 1900, Baseball Hall of Fame member Rube Waddell was suspended for two months by the Pittsburgh Pirates, during which time he pitched for the Punxsutawney team.

In 1906, Punxsutawney began minor league play, when the Punxsutawney "Policemen" became members of the eight–team Class D level Interstate League. The Bradford Drillers, DuBois Miners, Erie Sailors, Hornell Pigmies, Kane Mountaineers, Oil City Oilers and Olean Refiners teams joined Punxsutawney in beginning league play on May 14, 1906.

The use of the "Policemen" moniker corresponds to the Pennsylvania State Police Troop D policemen being headquartered in Punxsutawney in the era.

Punxsutawney and the other Interstate League franchises operated with a team salary cap of $750 per month for the total roster. The league rules required the host team to guarantee the visiting team $50.00 per game, with a rain guarantee of $25.00. On Saturdays and holidays, the home team's gate receipts were to be divided equally by both teams.

In their first season of play, the Punxsutawney Policemen placed second in the Interstate League. Finishing with a record of 53–45, the Policemen were managed by W.J. Brown. In the final standings, Punxsutawney finished 8.0 games behind the first place Erie Fisherman.

In their final season, the 1907 Punxsutawney Policemen folded before the season was completed. On August 3, 1907, the Policemen franchise folded. After beginning 1907 play in the eight–team league, Punxsutawney ended their final season with a record of 33–26 as Milt Montgomery and W. J. Brown served as managers. Punxsutawney and the other teams of the Interstate League were plagued by bad weather and corresponding financial troubles in 1907, with Erie being the only league franchise without debt.

The Interstate League continued play in 1908, but the Punxsutawney Policemen did not return as a league franchise. Punxsutawney has not hosted another minor league team.

== The ballpark ==
The Punxsutawney Policemen home ballpark was referred to by the local Punxsutawney Spirit newspaper as the "Punxsutawney Diamond." Barclay Square was in use in the era, having begun as a public park in 1822. Today, the park is still in use and hosts the Groundhog Day celebration in Punxsutawney.

== Timeline ==
Year(s)	# Yrs.	Team	Level	League	Ballpark
1906–1907	2	Punxsutawney Policemen	Class D	Interstate League	Punxsutawney Diamond

== Year–by–year records ==
Year	Record	Finish	Manager	Playoffs/notes
1906	53–45	2nd	W. J. Brown	No playoffs held
1907	33–26	NA	Milt Montgomery / W.J. Brown	Team folded August 3

== Notable alumni ==
- Jim Clark (1906)
- Bob Dresser (1906)
- John McDonald (1906)
- Roxey Roach (1906-1907)

=== See also ===
Punxsutawney Policemen players
