= Western New York League =

- Classification: Independent (1890)
- Sport: Minor League Baseball
- First season: 1890
- Folded: September 27, 1890
- No. of teams: 4
- Country: United States of America
- Most titles: 1 Canisteo (1890)
- Related competitions: Central New Jersey League (1891–1902); Southern Tier League (1904–1905)

The Western New York League was a minor league baseball league that played briefly in the 1890 season. The four–team Independent level Western New York League consisted of franchises based exclusively in New York. The Western New York League permanently folded after the 1890 season.

== History ==
The Western New York League began play as an Independent level minor league in 1890. The Bath Bathers, Canisteo, New York, Hornell, New York and Wellsville, New York teams were the four charter franchises.

The Western New York League began play on September 9, 1890. When the season ended on September 27, 1890, the Canisteo team was in first place with a 6–0 record. Canisteo was followed by Wellsville (3–3), Hornell (2–4) and the Bath Bathers (1–5) in the final standings.

Baseball Hall of Fame member John McGraw played the 1890 shortened season as a member of the Wellsville team. Aviator Alfred Lawson was a teammate of McGraw on the Wellsville team.

The Western New York League permanently folded after the 1890 season.

== 1890 Western New York League teams ==
Team name	City represented	Ballpark	Year active
Bath Bathers	Bath, New York	Unknown	1890
Canisteo	Canisteo, New York	Unknown	1890
Hornell	Hornell, New York	Unknown	1890
Wellsville	Wellsville, New York	Unknown	1890

== Western New York League standings ==
=== 1890 ===
Team standings	W	L	PCT	GB	Managers
Canisteo	6	0	1.000	–	NA
Wellsville	3	3	.500	3	Alfred Lawson
Hornell	2	4	.333	4	NA
Bath Bathers	1	5	.167	5	NA
