= Edward Larkin (American football) =

American physician and football coach (1882–1948)

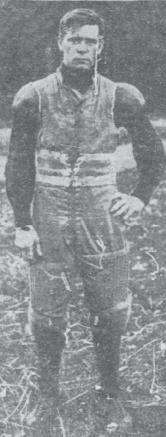
- Larkin in 1907

Biographical details
- Born: March 17, 1882; Ithaca, New York, U.S.
- Died: August 18, 1948 (aged 66); Washington, D.C., U.S.

Playing career

Football
- 1902: Cornell
- 1904: Georgetown
- Positions: End, halfback

Coaching career (HC unless noted)

Football
- 1905–1908: Cornell (assistant)
- 1907: Georgetown (line)
- 1907–1908: Carlisle (assistant)
- 1909: Maryland
- 1911: Cornell (assistant)
- 1911: Carlisle (ends)

Baseball
- 1906–1907: DuBois Miners

Head coaching record
- Overall: 2–5 (college football)

Patrick Edward "Bunny" Larkin (March 17, 1882 – August 18, 1948) was an American physician, college football coach, and baseball manager. He served as a co-head coach alongside William Lang for the Maryland Agricultural College (now the University of Maryland) in 1909. Larkin was also an assistant football coach at Cornell University, the Carlisle Indian Industrial School, and Georgetown University. He worked for many years as a team physician for the Washington Senators baseball team.

== Early life ==
Larkin was born on March 17, 1882, in Ithaca, New York, where he received his early education. He played as a quarterback for Ithaca High School. Larkin played baseball as a catcher for the Haverling team. He enrolled at Cornell University for his undergraduate education in 1902, and played on the football team. The Elmira Morning Telegram wrote, "He was a fast, tricky end, who knew all of the possibilities of the position."

Larkin attended the Georgetown University School of Medicine, from which he graduated in 1908. He earned a varsity letter on the Georgetown football team in 1904. After college, Larkin held an internship with the Providence Hospital in Washington, D.C.

== Coaching career ==
Upon the expiration of his college athletic eligibility, Larkin coached football as an assistant at Cornell. In 1907, he served as an assistant at the Carlisle Indian Industrial School under head coach Glenn "Pop" Warner, and helped coach the line and played on the practice team at Georgetown. Bill Stern later described Larkin's coaching as "a gem of brevity and logic". One season at Carlisle, Larkin explained to his players the game: "Boys, football is like this: When white man has ball, knock down white man. When Indian has ball, knock down white man." At Carlisle, he "drilled Warner's Indians to look after Chicago's forward passes and fake plays".

He turned down the opportunity to coach at Georgetown for the 1908 season despite strong support from the school's alumni and students. He instead coached the ends at Cornell as the "head field coach". In October, he spent a week confined with blood poisoning before returning to the sidelines. In 1906 and 1907, Larkin also managed the DuBois, Pennsylvania based DuBois Miners baseball club of the Interstate League, having played baseball in the minor leagues beginning in 1904.

Larkin worked for many years as the club physician for the Washington Senators baseball team. He was also the team physician for the Georgetown football program. In 1909, while also working for the Senators, Larkin assisted Bill Lang as co-head coach at the Maryland Agricultural College (now the University of Maryland). The team finished the season with a 2–5 record.

In 1911, Larkin coached the ends at Carlisle, and then assisted Ray Van Orman in coaching the ends at Cornell. During the 1913 season, Warner, a long-time friend, lent his assistant and former Carlisle star Albert Exendine to coach the Georgetown football team in its final games as a favor to Larkin. Exendine served as head coach at Georgetown for nine more seasons. Larkin suffered a brief illness and died on August 18, 1948.

== Head coaching record ==
=== College football ===
Year	Team	Overall	Conference	Standing	Bowl/playoffs
Maryland Aggies (Independent) (1909)
1909	Maryland	2–5			
Maryland:		2–5			
Total:		2–5			
