= Bath Bathers =

Defunct Minor League Baseball team

- 1890; Bath, New York

Minor league affiliations
- Class: Independent (1890)
- League: Western New York League (1890)

Major league affiliations
- Team: None

Minor league titles
- League titles (0): None

Team data
- Name: Bath Bathers (1890)
- Ballpark: Unknown (1890)

The Bath Bathers were a minor league baseball team based in Bath, New York, In 1890, the Bathers played as members of the short–lived four–team Independent level Western New York League.

== History ==
Minor league baseball began in Bath, New York in 1890. The Bath "Bathers" became charter members of the Independent level Western New York League, which formed late in the 1890 season. The teams from Canisteo, New York, Hornell and Wellsville, New York joined Bath as the four league charter franchises, beginning league play on September 9, 1890.

The Bath Bathers finished in last place in the short season of play. When the season ended on September 27, 1890, the Canisteo team was in first place with a 6–0 record. Canisteo was followed by Wellsville (3–3), Hornell (2–4) and the Bath Bathers (1–5) in the final standings. The manager of the Bath team is not referenced.

The Western New York League permanently folded after the 1890 season.

Bath, New York has not hosted another minor league team.

== The ballpark ==
The name of the home minor league ballpark of the 1890 Bath Bathers is not known.

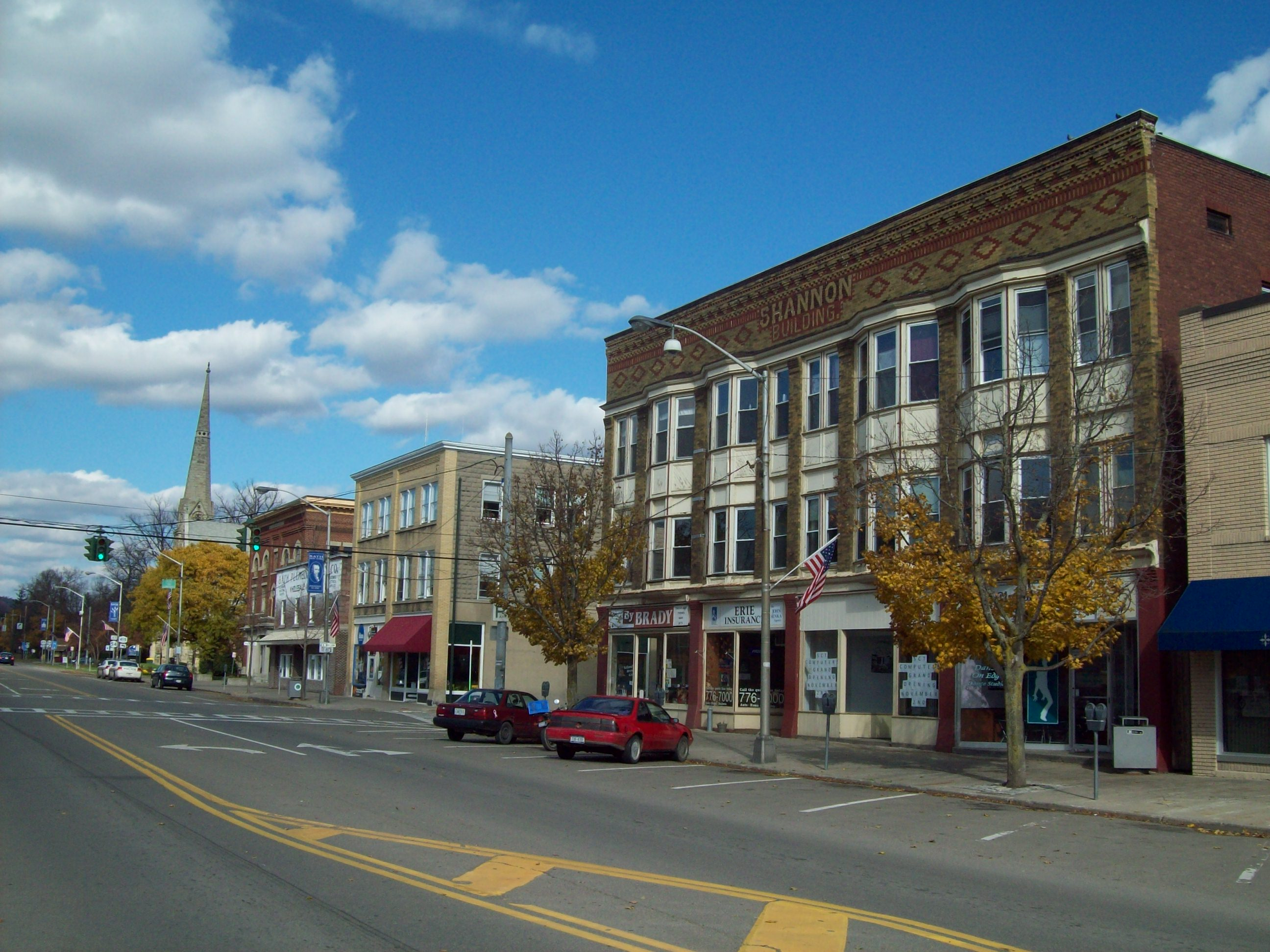
(2009) Liberty Street. National Register of Historic Places. Bath, New York

== Year–by–year record ==
Year	Record	Finish	Manager	Playoffs/notes
1905	1–5	4th	N/A	No playoffs held

== Notable alumni ==
The 1890 Bath Bathers' minor league roster is not referenced.
