= Pottstown Legionaires =

- 1932; Pottstown, Pennsylvania

Minor league affiliations
- Class: Class D (1932)
- League: Interstate League (1932)

Major league affiliations
- Team: None

Minor league titles
- League titles (0): None

Team data
- Name: Pottstown Legionaires (1932)
- Ballpark: Memorial Park* (1932)

The Pottstown Legionaires were a short lived minor league baseball team based in Pottstown, Pennsylvania. In 1932, the Legionaires played as members of the six–team, Class D level Interstate League. The Interstate League folded during the 1932 season, with Pottstown in second place.

== History ==
In 1904 the "Pottstown" team played the season as members of the independent six-team Pennsylvania League. The league standings are unknown.

Minor league baseball resumed in Pottstown in the 1932 season, when the Pottstown "Legionaires" became members of the reformed six-team Class D level Interstate League. The Interstate League started the season when the Lancaster Red Sox, Norristown, Stroudsburg Poconos, Tamaqua Dukes and Washington Potomacs joined Pottstown in beginning league play on May 20, 1932.

The Norristown team relocated to become the St. Clair Saints on May 27, 1932, before the Saints folded on June 12, 1932, leaving the Interstate League with five remaining teams. The Lancaster Red Sox folded in June 17. The Interstate League then folded three days later, on June 20, 1932.

The Legionaires ended their brief season in second place season with an overall record of 18–8. Managed by Earl Potteiger, Pottstown finished just 1.0 game behind the first place Stroudsburg Poconos (19–7) in the final standings. Pottstown finished ahead of the third place Norristown/St Clair (11–10) team. St. Clair was followed by the fourth place Slatington Dukes (10–16), while the Washington Potomacs (9–17) and Lancaster Red Sox (7–16) finished in fifth and sixth place.

Pitcher Matt Ramsey of Pottstown lead the Interstate League with 7 wins and a 7–1 record.

After folding in 1932, the Interstate League returned to play in 1939, without a Pottstown team. Pottstown has not hosted another minor league team.

== The ballpark ==
The name of the Pottstown home minor league ballpark is not directly referenced. Founded as a park in 1855, Memorial Park was in use in the era with a grandstand for racing and other events on the infield. Today, Memorial Park is still in use as a public park with ballfields and other amenities on 70 acres. The park is located at 75 King Street in Pottstown.

== Year–by–year record ==
| Year | Record | Finish | Manager | Playoffs/notes |
|---|---|---|---|---|
| 1932 | 18–8 | 2nd | Earl Potteiger | League disbanded June 25 |

== Notable alumni ==
- Earl Potteiger (1932, MGR)
- Elmer Zacher (1904)

== See also ==
Pottstown (minor league baseball) players
