= Gus Dundon =

American baseball player (1874–1940)

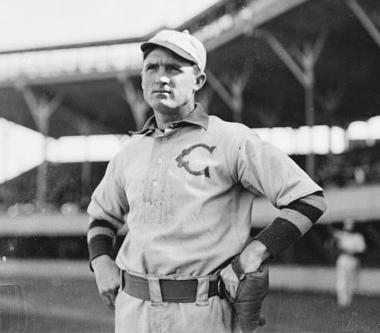
- Second baseman
- Born: July 10, 1874; Columbus, Ohio, U.S.
- Died: September 1, 1940 (aged 66); Pittsburgh, Pennsylvania, U.S.
- Batted: Right Threw: Right

MLB debut
- April 14, 1904, for the Chicago White Sox

Last MLB appearance
- October 7, 1906, for the Chicago White Sox

MLB statistics
- Batting average: .202
- Home runs: 0
- Runs batted in: 62
- Stats at Baseball Reference

Teams
- Chicago White Sox (1904–1906)

Augustus Joseph Dundon (July 10, 1874 – September 1, 1940) was an American second baseman in Major League Baseball. He played for the Chicago White Sox.

== Biography ==
Dundon was born in Columbus, Ohio. He began his professional baseball career at the age of 21, in the Virginia League. He played several infield positions early in his career.

From 1901 to 1903, Dundon was a third baseman for the Western League's Denver Grizzlies. He was considered the best fielding third baseman in the league. In 1902, he hit .303 and also led the league with 44 stolen bases.

Dundon was acquired by the White Sox in 1904. He continued to play well defensively, leading the league's second basemen in fielding percentage in 1904 and 1905. However, Dundon failed to hit in the majors. In early 1906, he was batting just .135 when he lost his spot in the starting lineup. Chicago won the American League pennant that year, but Dundon did not appear in the 1906 World Series. He played his last major league game on October 7.

The following season, Dundon played for the Minneapolis Millers of the American Association. He was the team's manager-captain. He continued his solid defense at second base but hit .191. In 1908, he moved to the New Orleans Pelicans of the Southern Association. That year, he led the league's second basemen in fielding percentage but again failed to reach the Mendoza Line.

Dundon played in various minor leagues over the next few years. He spent 1912-1914 in the Tri-State League. In 1915 and 1916, he was the manager for the Interstate League's Olean White Sox.

Dundon died in Pittsburgh, Pennsylvania, at the age of 66.
