= St. Clair Saints =

- 1932; St. Clair, Pennsylvania

Minor league affiliations
- Class: Class D (1932)
- League: Interstate League (1932)

Major league affiliations
- Team: None

Minor league titles
- League titles (0): None

Team data
- Name: St. Clair Saints (1932)
- Ballpark: Unknown (1932)

The St. Clair Saints were a minor league baseball team based in St. Clair, Pennsylvania. In 1932, the Saints played briefly as members of the six–team, Class D level Interstate League. St. Clair joined the league when the Norristown team relocated to St. Clair during the season, only to have the team fold shortly after. After the demise of the St. Clair franchise, the Interstate League folded soon after, with St. Clair credited with a third place finish.

== History ==
Early in the 1932 season, the Norristown team of the Class D level Interstate League moved to St. Clair. The "St. Clair Saints" then began play, before folding after a few weeks. The Interstate League had started the season with the Lancaster Red Sox, Norristown, Pottstown Legionaires, Stroudsburg Poconos, Tamaqua Dukes and Washington Potomacs teams beginning league play on May 20, 1932.

One week into the season, the Norristown team relocated to St. Clair on May 27, 1932, with a 2–4 record. After playing 15 games based in St. Clair, the "Saints" folded on June 12, 1932, leaving the Interstate League with five remaining teams. The league then folded on June 20, 1932.

After compiling a 9–6 record while based in St. Clair, the Saints ended their season with an overall record of 11–10 to be credited with finishing in third place. Managed by Steve Yerkes, the Norristown/St. Clair team finished 8.5 games behind the first place Stroudsburg Poconos (19–7) in the final standings. Pottstown (18–8) finished in second place, ahead of third place Norristown/St Clair (11–10). St. Clair was followed by the fourth place Slatington Dukes (10–16), while the Washington Potomacs (9–17) and Lancaster Red Sox (7–16) finished in fifth and sixth place.

Future major league player Dom Dallessandro played for the 1932 St. Clair Saints, leading the Interstate League in hitting, with a .418 average in the shortened season. St. Clair manager Steve Yerkes was a veteran minor league manager and a Pennsylvania native, who was born and died in the state.

After folding in 1932, the Interstate League returned to play in 1939, without a St. Clair team. St. Clair has not hosted another minor league team.

== The ballpark ==
While based in Norristown, the team played 1932 home games at Bartasch Park. The name of the St. Clair ballpark is unknown.

== Year–by–year record ==
Year	Record	Finish	Manager	Playoffs/notes
1932	11–10	3rd	Steve Yerkes	Norristown (2–4) moved to St. Clair May 27; Team disbanded June 12; League disbanded June 25

== Notable alumni ==
- Dom Dallessandro (1932)
- Steve Yerkes (1932, MGR)
