= Corning Memorial Stadium =

Stadium in Corning, New York, US

- Interactive map of Corning Memorial Stadium
- Address: Corning, New York; USA
- Coordinates: 42.1473732°N 77.050206°W
- Owner: City of Corning
- Operator: Corning-Painted Post Area School District
- Event: American Football
- Surface: artificial turf
- Scoreboard: Yes

Construction
- Opened: 12 September 1948
- Closed: 1969

Corning Memorial Stadium is a stadium in Corning, New York. Dedicated on September 12, 1948, it was primarily used for baseball until 1969 and was home to the Corning Independents. It holds 3,000 people. It is currently leased by the Corning-Painted Post Area School District and is frequently used for high school football, lacrosse, soccer games, as well as two annual marching band shows.
