= Southern Tier League =

- Classification: Independent (1904–1905)
- Sport: Minor League Baseball
- First season: 1904
- Folded: 1905
- Commissioner: Unknown (1904–1905)
- No. of teams: 7
- Country: United States of America
- Most titles: 1 Addison White Sox (1904)*

The Southern Tier League was a six–team Independent level minor league baseball league that played in the 1904 and 1905 seasons. The Southern Tier League featured franchises based in New York and Pennsylvania and permanently folded after the 1905 season.

== History ==
The Southern Tier League formed as Independent level minor league in 1904. The charter league members were the Addison White Sox, Corning White Ponies, Coudersport, Elmira, New York, Hornellsville Maple Cities, Penn Yan Grape Pickers and Wellsville Oil Drillers. League standings in some references list Hornellsville as the first place team, but August 20 newspaper accounts show Addison in first place with Hornellsville well behind in fifth place. The league was also referred to as the "Southern Tier Association."

The 1905 Southern Tier League continued play as a four–team Independent league. The four teams were the Addison-Wellsville Tobacco Strippers, Corning Glassblowers, Elmira and Hornellsville Blue Birds. The 1905 standings and statistics are unknown.

The Southern Tier League permanently folded as a minor league after the 1905 season. A league with the same name later played as a semi–pro league.

== Southern Tier League teams ==
| Team name(s) | City represented | Manager(s) | Year(s) active |
|---|---|---|---|
| Addison White Sox (1904); Addison-Wellsville Tobacco Strippers (1905) | Addison, New York | Bill Heine (1904–1905) | 1904 to 1905 |
| Corning White Ponies (1904); Corning Glassblowers (1905) | Corning, New York | Quinton Farr / Charles M. Turrell(1904); Jimmie Heffernan (1905) | 1904 to 1905 |
| Coudersport | Coudersport, Pennsylvania | Charles Eichberger | 1904 |
| Elmira | Elmira, New York | Cooney Rice / Ray Hagan (1904); Harry Curtis / Cooney Rice (1905) | 1904 to 1905 |
| Hornellsville Maple Cities (1904); Hornellsville Blue Birds (1905) | Hornellsville, New York | Charles H. Landon (1904); Jack Quinn (1905) | 1904 to 1905 |
| Penn Yan Grape Pickers | Penn Yan, New York | John Davis | 1904 |
| Wellsville Oil Drillers | Wellsville, New York | Fred Arnold | 1904 |

== Southern Tier League overall standings ==
The 1904 and 1905 Southern Tier League records and statistics are unknown. The 1904 reported standings on August 20, 1904, are listed below. The 1905 standings are unknown.

=== 1904 (standings from August 20, 1904) ===
| Team standings | W | L | PCT |
|---|---|---|---|
| Addison | 22 | 11 | .666 |
| "Father Matthew" | 22 | 12 | .647 |
| Corning | 19 | 14 | .575 |
| Wellsville | 12 | 18 | .400 |
| Hornellsville | 12 | 22 | .352 |
| Cloudersport | 9 | 19 | .321 |

== Notable alumni ==
- Lee DeMontreville, Corning/Addison (1904-1905)
