= Slatington Dukes =

- 1932; Slatington, Pennsylvania

Minor league affiliations
- Class: Class D (1932)
- League: Interstate League (1932)

Major league affiliations
- Team: None

Minor league titles
- League titles (0): None

Team data
- Name: Slatington Dukes (1932)
- Ballpark: Victory Park (1932)

The Slatington Dukes were a minor league baseball team based in Slatington, Pennsylvania. In 1932, the Dukes played a partial season as members of the Class D level Interstate League, joining the league when the Tamaqua Dukes team relocated from Tamaqua to Slatington during the season, only to have the league fold less than two weeks later. Slatington hosted Dukes' home minor league games at Victory Park.

== History ==
During the 1932 season, the Tamaqua Dukes of the Class D level Interstate League moved to Slatington on June 7, 1932. The "Slatington Dukes" then began play, inheriting an 8–12 record. The Interstate League began the season with the Lancaster Red Sox, Norristown Saints, Pottstown Legionaires, Stroudsburg Poconos, Tamaqua Dukes, and Washington Potomacs teams beginning league play on May 20, 1932.

On June 20, 1932, the Interstate League folded. The Norristown Saints team had relocated to St. Clair on May 27, 1932, only to have the franchise fold on June 12, 1932, leaving the league with five remaining teams. After compiling a 2–4 record while based in Slatington, the Dukes ended their season with an overall record of 10–16 to finish in fourth place. Managed by Lee Strait, the Dukes finished 9.0 games behind the first place Stroudsburg Poconos in the final standings. Pottstown (18–8) and Norristown/St Clair (11–10) finished in second and third place, while the Washington Potomacs (9–17) and Lancaster Red Sox (7–16) finished behind Slatington in fifth and sixth place.

Future major league player Bob Barr played for the Slatington Dukes.

After folding in 1932, the Interstate League returned to play in 1939, when it reformed without a franchise in Slatington. Slatington, Pennsylvania has not since hosted another minor league team, though the Lehigh Valley IronPigs, the Triple-A affiliate of the Philadelphia Phillies, are based in nearby Allentown, Pennsylvania.

== The ballpark ==
The Slatington Dukes hosted home minor league games at Victory Park. Still in use today as a public park with a swimming pool, amphitheater and pavilion, Victory Park is located at Main and Grove Streets in Slatington, Pennsylvania. The borough celebrated the 100 year anniversary of Victory Park on July 24, 2021.

== Year–by–year record ==
| Year | Record | Finish | Manager | Playoffs/notes |
|---|---|---|---|---|
| 1932 | 10–16 | 4th | Lee Strait | Tamaqua (8–12) moved to Slatington June 7 League folded June 20 |

== Notable alumni ==
- Bob Barr (1932)

== See also ==
- Tamagua/Slatington Dukes players
