= Youngstown Puddlers =

The Youngstown Puddlers was a Minor League Baseball team based in Youngstown, Ohio, United States. The team was part of the Interstate League. The team existed in the late 19th century. Eventually the team would also be named the Little Giants.

The team's puddler name was derived from a type of iron worker in iron factories and foundries, and Youngstown was especially well known for its iron and steel manufacturing.
