= Wellsville Rainmakers =

- 1914–1916; Wellsville, New York

Minor league affiliations
- Class: Class D (1914–1916)
- League: Interstate League (1914–1916)

Major league affiliations
- Team: None

Minor league titles
- League titles (1): 1915
- Conference titles (1): 1915

Team data
- Name: Wellsville Rainmakers (1914–1916)
- Ballpark: Island Park (1914–1916)

The Wellsville Rainmakers were a minor league baseball team based in Wellsville, New York. From 1914 to 1916, the Rainmakers played as members of the Class D level Interstate League, winning the 1915 league championship. Wellsville hosted home minor league games at Island Park.

== History ==
Wellsville began minor league play in 1890, when the "Wellsville" team played briefly as a member of the Western New York League, an Independent level minor league. The league began play on September 9, 1890.

When the season ended on September 27, 1890, Wellsville finished in second place, The Canisteo team was in first place with a 6–0 record, followed by Wellsville (3–3), Hornell (2–4) and the Bath Bathers (1–5) in the final standings.

Baseball Hall of Fame member John McGraw played the 1890 shortened season as a member of the Wellsville team. Aviator Alfred Lawson was a teammate of MCGraw on the Wellsville team. The Western New York League permanently folded after the 1890 season.

In 1904 Wellsville next hosted minor league baseball, when the Wellsville "Oil Drillers" played the season as members of the independent Southern Tier League.

Resuming minor league play in 1914, the Wellsville "Rainmakers" joined the six team, Class D level Interstate League, which reformed after folding in 1908. The Bradford Drillers, Hornell Green Sox, Jamestown Giants, Olean Refiners and Warren Bingoes teams joined Wellsville in beginning league play on May 22, 1914.

The 1914 Rainmakers ended the Class D level Interstate League season in fifth place in the six–team league. With a record of 41–60, Wellsville was managed by William Clarke and Elmer Bliss. Bliss was hired on June 25. Bliss had been expected to manage the Hornell team to begin the season but was arrested and fined $100.00 for promoting gambling in his Idle Hour Pool Parlor in Hornell just before the season. In the final standings, the Rainmakers finished 19.0 games behind the first place Jamestown Giants. Wellsville did not qualify for the playoff, won by Jamestown over Bradford.

In 1915, the Rainmakers won a contested Interstate League championship. Wellsville ended their 1915 season with a record of 54–32, playing the season under manager Joe Lohr. Lohr had managed the Jamestown Giants to the league title the previous season. The Rainmakers ended the season in a virtual tie with the Olean White Sox, who finished 52–30. Wellsville had captured the second half title of the split season schedule and Olean had captured the first half title. Olean refused to meet in the playoff final and Wellsville was declared league champion, Pitcher Everett Keener of Wellsville led the league with 14 wins. Teammate John Steinfeldt had 101 total hits to lead the league.

The Interstate League continued play in 1916, as the league expanded to eight teams to begin the season. The league ended the season with five teams, as Wellsville had a record of 27–48 under returning manager Joe Lohr. Wellsville placed fourth after the Erie Sailors, Olean White Sox and Warren Bingoes teams folded during the season. The Rainmakers ended the season 26.5 games behind the first place Ridgway team.

The Interstate League did not return to play in 1917. Wellsville next hosted minor league baseball with the 1942 Wellsville Yankees, who began play as members of the Class D level Pennsylvania–Ontario–New York League, as an affiliate of the New York Yankees.

== The ballpark ==
The Wellsville Rainmakers hosted home minor league games at Island Park. The ballpark was located at State Road 19 & the Genesee River. Island Park is still in use today as a public park.

== Timeline ==
Year(s)	# Yrs.	Team	Level	League	Ballpark
1914-1916	3	Wellsville Rainmakers	Class D	Interstate League	Island Park

== Year–by–year records ==
Year	Record	Finish	Manager	Playoffs/notes
1914	41–60	5th	William Clarke / Elmer Bliss	Did Not qualify
1915	54–32	1st (tie)	Joe Lohr	League champions No playoffs held
1916	27–48	4th	Joe Lohr	Did not qualify

== Notable alumni ==
- Petie Behan (1915)
- Elmer Bliss (1914, MGR)
- Jim Curry (1916)
- Ray Kennedy (1916)
- Jimmie Savage (1916)
- Frank Shaughnessy (1916)

== See also ==
Wellsville Rainmakers players
