= Pop Kelchner =

American athlete and coach (1875–1958)

Biographical details
- Born: August 2, 1875; Fleetwood, Pennsylvania, U.S.
- Died: September 19, 1958 (aged 83); Palmyra, Pennsylvania, U.S.
- Education: Lafayette

Playing career

Baseball
- 1904–1905: Lebanon Peaches
- 1907: Kane Mountaineers
- 1909: Harrisburg Senators

Coaching career (HC unless noted)

Football
- 1912–1918: Albright

Basketball
- 1900–1919: Albright

Baseball
- 1897–1918: Albright
- 1919: Reading Coal Barons
- 1922: Lebanon Valley

Head coaching record
- Overall: 16–39–5 (college football); 81–68 (college basketball)

Charles Schaeffer "Pop" Kelchner (August 2, 1875 – September 19, 1958) was an American football, basketball and baseball player and coach. He served as the head basketball coach at Albright College in Myerstown, Pennsylvania from 1900 to 1919.

== Head coaching record ==
=== Football ===
Year	Team	Overall	Conference	Standing	Bowl/playoffs
Albright Red and White (Independent) (1912–1918)
1912	Albright	2–7			
1913	Albright	3–4–3			
1914	Albright	5–3–1			
1915	Albright	2–7			
1916	Albright	1–8–1			
1917	Albright	3–7			
1918	Albright	0–3			
Albright:		16–39–5			
Total:		16–39–5			
