= Warren Bingoes =

- 1914–1915; (1908, 1914-1916); Warren, Pennsylvania

Minor league affiliations
- Class: Class D (1908, 1914–1916)
- League: Interstate League (1908, 1914–1916)

Major league affiliations
- Team: None

Minor league titles
- League titles (0): None

Team data
- Name: Warren Blues (1908); Warren Bingoes (1914–1915); Warren Warriors (1916)
- Ballpark: Russell Park (1908, 1914–1916)

The Warren Bingoes were a minor league baseball team based in Warren, Pennsylvania and Warren County, Pennsylvania. From 1914 to 1916, Warren teams played as members of the Class D level Interstate League, with the 1916 team nicknamed as the "Warriors." The 1908 Warren "Blues" preceded the Bingoes in Interstate League play.

The Warren teams hosted home minor league games at Russell Park.

== History ==
The 1895 "Warren" team first played minor league baseball as members of the Iron and Oil League. In 1908, the Warren "Blues" played a partial season as members of the Class D level Interstate League.

In 1908, the Warren Blues placed second as the Interstate League folded during the season. On June 5, 1908, the league folded. With a record of 11–8, Warren finished 5.5 games behind the first place Olean Candidates. Bernard McNeal managed Warren in the shortened season.

The Warren "Bingoes" rejoined the six team, Class D Interstate League in 1914. The Bradford Drillers, Hornell Green Sox, Jamestown Giants, Olean Refiners and Wellsville Rainmakers teams joined Warren in beginning league play on May 22, 1914.

The Warren Bingoes ended the Class D level Interstate League season in third place in the six–team league. With a record of 57–45, the Bingoes were managed by Bill Webb. In the final standings, the Miners finished 3.5 games behind the first place Jamestown Giants. The Bingoes did not qualify for the playoff, won by Jamestown over Bradford.

In 1915, the Bingoes continued play and placed fifth in the fifth Interstate League final standings, as no playoffs were held. Warren ended their 1915 season with a record of 33–50, playing the season under managers R.W. Archer and George Bell. The Bingoes finished 16.5 games behind the first place Wellsville Rainmakers in the standings.

The Interstate League continued play in 1916, but the newly named Warren "Warriors" did not survive the season. On August 4, 1916, the Warriors had a record of 24–19 when the team folded. Frank Shaughnessy served at the Warren manager in their partial season.

The Interstate League did not return to play in 1917. Warren next hosted minor league baseball with the 1940 Warren Redskins, who began a tenure of play as members of the Class D level Pennsylvania State Association.

== The ballpark ==
The Warren teams hosted home minor league games at Russell Park.

== Timeline ==
Year(s)	# Yrs.	Team	Level	League	Ballpark
1908	1	Warren Blues	Class D	Interstate League	Russell Park
1914-1915	3	Warren Bingoes	Class D	Interstate League	Russell Park
1916	1	Warren Warriors	Class D	Interstate League	Russell Park

== Year–by–year records ==
Year	Record	Finish	Manager	Playoffs/notes
1908	11–8	2nd	Bernard McNeal	League folded June 5
1914	57–45	3rd	Bill Webb	Did Not qualify
1915	33–50	5th	R.W. Archer / George Bell	No playoffs held
1916	24–19	NA	Frank Shaughnessy	Team folded August 4

== Notable alumni ==
- George Bell (1915, MGR)
- Bill Brady (1914)
- Dick Cotter (1916)
- Joe Gingras (1916)
- Carmen Hill (1914)
- George Payne (1916)
- Frank Shaughnessy (1916, MGR)
- Frank Smykal (1916)

== See also ==
- Warren Bingoes players
- Warren Warriors players
