= George Bell (pitcher) =

American baseball player (1874-1941)

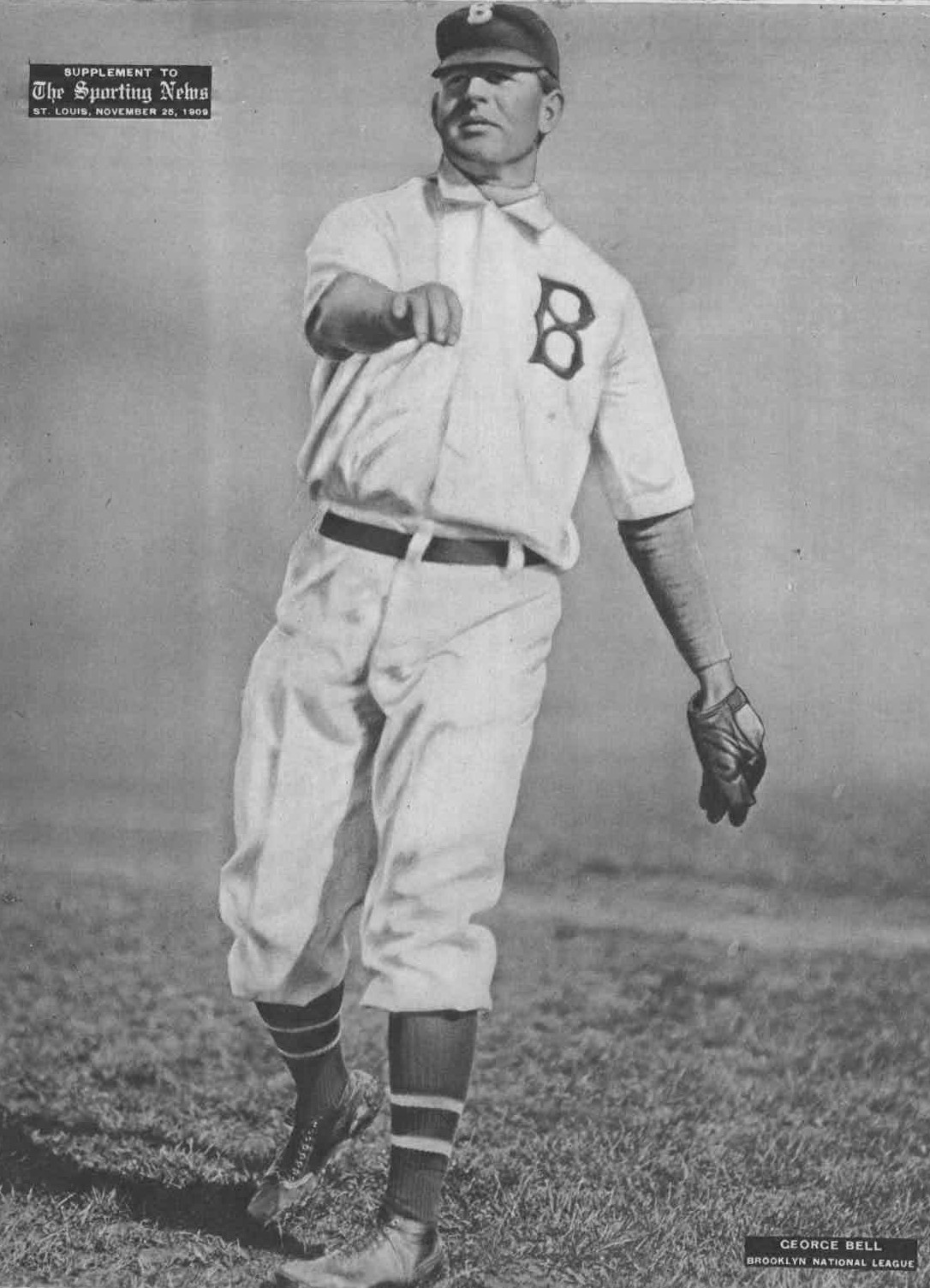
- Pitcher
- Born: November 2, 1874; Greenwood, New York, U.S.
- Died: December 25, 1941 (aged 67); New York City, U.S.
- Batted: Right Threw: Right

MLB debut
- April 17, 1907, for the Brooklyn Superbas

Last MLB appearance
- July 13, 1911, for the Brooklyn Dodgers

MLB statistics
- Win–loss record: 43-79
- Earned run average: 2.85
- Strikeouts: 376
- Stats at Baseball Reference

Teams
- Brooklyn Superbas/Dodgers (1907–1911)

George Glenn "Farmer" Bell (November 2, 1874 – December 25, 1941) was an American pitcher in Major League Baseball. He pitched with the Brooklyn Dodgers for 5 seasons.
