= Kane Mountaineers =

Former minor league baseball team in Pennsylvania, US

- 1905–1907; Kane, Pennsylvania

Minor league affiliations
- Class: Class D (1905–1907)
- League: Interstate League (1905–1907)

Major league affiliations
- Team: None

Minor league titles
- League titles (0): None

Team data
- Name: Kane Mountaineers (1905–1907)
- Ballpark: Kane Ballpark (1905–1907)

The Kane Mountaineers were a minor league baseball team based in Kane, Pennsylvania. From 1905 to 1907, the Mountaineers played as members of the Class D level Interstate League, with the Kane Ballpark hosting minor league home games.

== History ==
In 1905, Kane first hosted minor league play, when the Kane "Mountaineers" became members of the reformed six–team Class D level Interstate League. The Bradford Drillers, Coudersport Giants, Erie Fishermen, Jamestown Hill Climbers and Olean Refiners teams joined Kane in beginning league play on April 25, 1905.

Local business leaders in Kane backed the creation of the Mountaineers franchise. While providing entertainment, the business leaders also viewed the team as a morale boost for local business workers and laborers.

Kane and the other Interstate League teams had a salary cap of $750 per month. The league required the host team guarantee a visiting team $50.00 per game, with a rain guarantee of $25.00. On Saturdays and holidays, the gate receipts were to be divided equally by both teams.

In their first season of play, the Mountaineers finished in fifth place in the 1905 Interstate League final standings. Completing the season with an overall record of 40–58, the Mountaineers finished 18.5 games behind the first place Coudersport Giants, with Charles Eichberger serving as the Kane manager. In the final league standings, the Coudersport Giants (59–38) finished 1.0 game ahead of the second place Erie Fisherman (58–39), followed by The Olean Refiners (54–50), Bradford Drillers (46–54), Kane Mountaineers (40–56) and Jamestown Hill Climbers/DuBois Miners (40–60). Duke Servatius of Kane won 1905 the Interstate League batting title, with a .352 average.

The Kane Mountaineers continued Class D level Interstate League play in 1906. Kane ended the season in fourth place in the eight–team league, as the league added the Franklin Millionaires and Hornell Pigmies as expansion teams. Finishing with a record of 58–58, the Mountaineers were managed by Jim Collopy. In the final standings, Kane finished 12.0 games behind the first place Erie Fisherman.

In their final season, the 1907 Kane Mountaineers folded before completing the season. On July 16, 1907, the Mountaineers franchise folded. After beginning 1907 play in the eight–team league, Kane ended their final season with a record of 17–26 as Pop Kelchner served as manager. Kane and the teams of the Interstate League were plagued by bad weather and corresponding financial troubles in 1907, with Erie being the only league franchise without debt.

The Interstate League continued play in 1908, but Kane did not continue as a league franchise. Kane has not hosted another minor league team.

== The ballpark ==
The Kane Mountaineers hosted home minor league games at the Kane Ballpark. The Kane Ballpark was located between the Kane Flint and Bottle Company and the Standard Window Glass Plant in the era. Today, the former ballpark site is located near the Kane Manufacturing Corporation and the Kane Commons. The Kane Manufacturing Corporation is located at 515 North Fraley Street.

== Timeline ==
Year(s)	# Yrs.	Team	Level	League	Ballpark
1905–1907	3	Kane Mountaineers	Class D	Interstate League	Kane Ballpark

== Year–by–year records ==
Year	Record	Finish	Manager	Playoffs/notes
1905	40–58	5th	Charles Eichberger	No playoffs held
1906	58–58	4th	Jim Collopy	No playoffs held
1907	17–26	NA	Pop Kelchner	Team folded July 16

== Notable alumni ==
- Harry Coveleski (1907)
- Jake Daubert (1906)
- Gene Good (1905)
- Ed Gremminger (1907)
- Pop Kelchner (1907, MGR)

=== See also ===
Kane Mountaineers players
