= Doc Hazelton =

American baseball player (1876–1941)

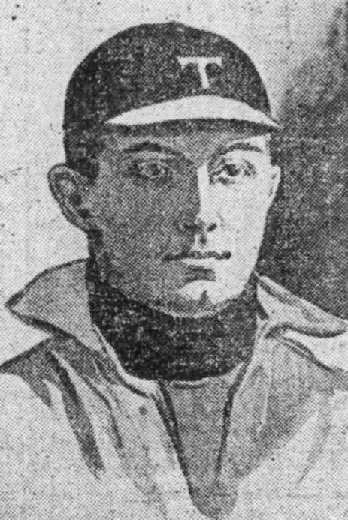
- Boston Globe, December 26, 1901
- First baseman
- Born: August 28, 1876; Strafford, Vermont, U.S.
- Died: March 10, 1941 (aged 64); Burlington, Vermont, U.S.
- Batted: Right Threw: Unknown

MLB debut
- April 17, 1902, for the St. Louis Cardinals

Last MLB appearance
- April 26, 1902, for the St. Louis Cardinals

MLB statistics
- Batting average: .130
- Home runs: 0
- Runs batted in: 0
- Stats at Baseball Reference

Teams
- St. Louis Cardinals (1902)

Willard Carpenter Hazelton (August 28, 1876 – March 10, 1941) was an American first baseman in Major League Baseball who played briefly for the St. Louis Cardinals during the 1902 season. After his playing career, Hazelton coached college baseball, including seasons at Tufts University, Dartmouth College, and the University of Vermont.

== Early life ==
Hazelton was born in Strafford, Vermont, the fourth son of Henry Hazelton and Amanda (Carpenter) Hazelton. Hazelton's extended family included US Senator Justin Smith Morrill; Henry Hazelton's sister Sylvia was the wife of Morrill's brother Amos. Hazelton was educated in the public schools of Strafford and Kimball Union Academy in Meriden, New Hampshire, from which he graduated in 1894. During the 1894-1895 school year, he was employed as a teacher at Strafford's elementary school.

In 1895, Hazelton enrolled at Dean Academy (now Dean College) in Franklin, Massachusetts. The school had a strong baseball program, and its alumni included Gabby Hartnett and Heinie Stafford. Hazelton had been playing baseball from his childhood days in Strafford, and was a pitcher on Dean Academy's varsity team. In addition, he was elected president of the school's Class of 1897.

Hazelton enrolled at Tufts University in 1897. In addition to studying engineering, he organized the school's first baseball team and was chosen to serve as its captain. During the summer months, he played on amateur teams located in towns throughout New England. In August 1899, Hazelton was struck in the head by a pitched ball while at bat during a game at the Fabyan House hotel in New Hampshire. He continued to play for several innings, then collapsed from the effects of a brain hemorrhage and skull fracture. He was left temporarily paralyzed on his right side and fell into a week-long coma, and doctors had little hope he would recover. After surgery to remove blood clots and pieces of bone from his brain, Hazelton regained consciousness. After a month of hospitalization, he returned home to continue his recovery; doctors attributed Hazelton's survival to the excellent physical condition he maintained as a result of his participation in baseball.

== Playing career ==
Following his recovery, Hazelton resumed playing baseball and studying at Tufts, and he graduated in June, 1901. He then signed a contract to play for the St. Louis Cardinals of Major League Baseball's National League. Intent on a career as a physician, Hazelton planned to use the money he made playing baseball to finance attendance at medical school; when word of his plan spread, sports writers and teammates nicknamed him "Doc".

Hazelton made his Cardinals debut on opening day, April 17, 1902. The Cardinals lost to the Pittsburgh Pirates 1-0, and Hazelton achieved his first hit, a single off Deacon Phillippe. The following day, the Pirates beat the Cardinals 10-4; Hazelton collected the second hit of his career, another single, and every Cardinal fielder but Hazelton made at least one error. In the third game of the series, Pittsburgh won 10-2; Hazelton went hitless and committed two errors. His hitting slump continued, and the Cardinals released Hazelton after the seventh game of the season. He never returned to the major leagues, and in his one season career, Hazelton posted a .130 batting average (3-for-23). He did not get any extra-base hits, score a run, or drive in any runs.

Following his release from the Cardinals, Hazelton played briefly for the Eastern League team in Rochester, New York, then broke his contract and joined an independent semi-professional team in Milford, Massachusetts. He ended his full time playing career at the completion of the 1902 baseball season. Because he broke his Rochester contract, Hazelton was banned from major league baseball and the organized minor leagues.

== Continued career ==
In 1903, Hazelton became the baseball coach at the University of Vermont. In addition to coaching the college team, he played in Vermont's semi-professional Northern League during the summer months, first for the team based in Burlington, Vermont, and later for the Newport, Vermont team. He continued to play semi-pro baseball during the summer months, and spent time with several teams in New England and New York.

At the start of the 1904 season, Hazelton signed a contract to play for the Toledo Mud Hens of the American Association. He soon changed his mind and returned to Vermont. After leading UVM to an 11-13 record in 1903, in 1904, Hazelton's team posted a record of 14 wins and 5 losses. The team's 1904 success was due in part to Hazelton's success at recruiting pitcher Ed Reulbach; Ruelbach had previously played for the University of Notre Dame, but agreed to play for UVM after marrying a woman from Montpelier, Vermont.

After coaching UVM through the 1905 season, Hazelton began 1906 playing for the Johnstown, Pennsylvania team of the Tri-State League; he returned to Vermont in June, and rejoined the Burlington team of the Northern League. In 1907, he applied for reinstatement to major league baseball, but was denied. He continued to play for semi-professional teams and returned to UVM as coach for the 1910 and 1911 seasons. In 1912, he was appointed coach of the baseball team at Tufts University. In 1915, he was named coach of the Dartmouth College baseball team, and led the team to a record of 12 wins and 9 losses. Hazelton coached at UVM in 1916 and 1917, after which he ended his involvement in organized baseball.

== Later life ==
After leaving baseball, Hazelton was employed at a wool brokerage in New York City. He retired in 1937, and his wife and he resided at the Hotel Vermont in Burlington. In 1941, Hazelton was diagnosed with cancer. He died at a Burlington hospital on March 10, 1941. He was buried at Lakeview Cemetery in Burlington.

== Family ==
In 1912, Hazelton married Emma Louise Beech. They were the parents of daughter Cora (1913-1924).
