= Jiggs Parson =

American baseball player (1885-1967)

- Pitcher
- Born: December 27, 1885; Parker, Dakota Territory
- Died: May 19, 1967 (aged 81); Los Angeles, California, U.S.
- Batted: Right Threw: Right

MLB debut
- May 16, 1910, for the Boston Doves

Last MLB appearance
- June 4, 1911, for the Boston Rustlers

MLB statistics
- Win–loss record: 0–3
- Earned run average: 4.92
- Strikeouts: 14
- Stats at Baseball Reference

Teams
- Boston Doves / Rustlers (1910–1911)

William Edwin "Jiggs" Parson (December 27, 1885 – May 19, 1967) was an American professional baseball pitcher. He played two seasons in Major League Baseball (MLB) with the Boston Doves / Rustlers, a National League team later known as the Boston Braves. His professional career spanned 1907 to 1916.

Also nicknamed "Chief", Parson was born in 1885 played baseball for and graduated from Bucknell University in 1908. He died in 1967 and was survived by a son and daughter, as well as his wife, two grandchildren, and one great-grandchild.
