= Olean Refiners =

- 1905–1914; (1905–1908, 1914-1916); Olean, New York

Minor league affiliations
- Class: Class D (1905–1908, 1914-1916)
- League: Interstate League (1905–1908, 1914-1916)

Major league affiliations
- Team: None

Minor league titles
- League titles (1): 1908
- Conference titles (1): 1915

Team data
- Name: Olean Refiners (1905–1907); Olean Candidates (1908); Olean Refiners (1914); Olean White Sox (1915-1916)
- Ballpark: Interstate League Park (1905–1908, 1914-1916)

The Olean Refiners were a minor league baseball team based in Olean, New York. From 1905 to 1908 and again from 1914 to 1916, Olean teams played exclusively as members of the Class D level Interstate League, winning the 1908 league championship. Olean played as the "Candidates" in 1908 and the "White Sox" in 1915 and 1916, winning a contested pennant in 1915.

Olean hosted home minor league games at Interstate League Park.

The "Refiners" nickname corresponds to the Oil industry in the Olean area in the era.

== History ==
=== Interstate League 1905 to 1908 ===
The 1890, the "Olean" team first played minor league baseball as members of the New York-Pennsylvania League. The Refiners were immediately preceded in minor league play by the 1898 "Olean" team, who played the season as members of the Iron and Oil League.

In 1905, Olean resumed hosting minor league play, when the Olean "Refiners" became members of the reformed six–team Class D level Interstate League. The Bradford Drillers, Coudersport Giants, Erie Fishermen, Jamestown Hill Climbers and Kane Mountaineers teams joined Olean in beginning league play on April 25, 1905.

Interstate League teams, Olean included, had a salary cap of $750 per team per month. The league required the home team to pay the visiting team $50.00 per game for weekday games, with a rain guarantee of $25.00. On Saturdays and holidays, the gate receipts were divided equally by between teams.

The "Refiners" nickname corresponds to the Oil industry in the Olean area. Oil was first discovered 1627, 12 miles north of Olean. From 1865 to 1930, Olean and its surrounding oil fields claimed to be the largest producer of oil in the world, before production greatly diminished in subsequent years.

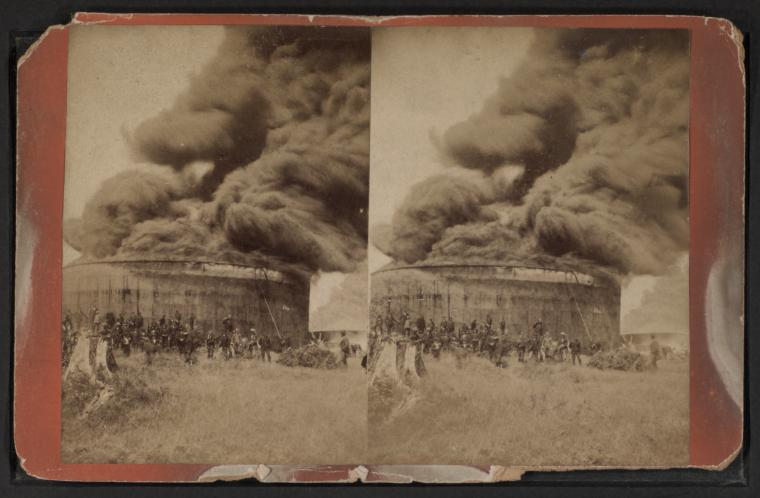
Burning oil tanks. Olean, New York

In their first season of play, the Refiners placed third in the 1905 Interstate League standings. Completing the season with an overall record of 54–50, the Refiners finished 8.5 games behind the first place Coudersport Giants, with Al Lawson and Eddie Foster serving as managers. In the final league standings, the Coudersport Giants (59–38) finished 1.0 game ahead of the second place Erie Fisherman (58–39), followed by The Olean Refiners (54–50), Bradford Drillers (46–54), Kane Mountaineers (40–56) and Jamestown Hill Climbers/DuBois Miners (40–60).

The Olean Refiners continued Class D level Interstate League play in 1906. The Refiners ended the season in seventh place in the eight–team league, as the league added the Franklin Millionaires and Hornell Pigmies as expansion teams. Finishing with a record of 50–62, the Refiners were managed by John Ziegler and John Dailey. In the final standings, Olean finished 18.0 games behind the first place Erie Fisherman.

The 1907 Olean Refiners folded before completing the Interstate League season. On July 18, 1907, the Olean franchise folded. After beginning 1907 play in the eight–team league, the Refiners ended the season with a record of 12–35 as Joe Flynn served as manager. Olean and their partner teams of the Interstate League were plagued by bad weather the resulting financial situation in 1907, as Erie was the only league franchise not in debt. Erie, Bradford, Franklin and Oil City continued play as a four-team league, with Erie ending the season with the best record.

In 1908, the Olean "Candidates" won the league championship as the Interstate League resumed play but folded during the season. The "Candidates" nickname corresponds to Olean being home to Frank W. Higgins, who served as the 35th Governor of New York and operated a family business in the city before his political career. Higgins died in Olean on February 12, 1907. The Higgins residence was at 128 South Street in Olean.

On June 5, 1908, the Interstate League folded. With a record of 16–2, playing under manager Percy Stetler, Olean finished 5.5 games ahead of the second place Warren Bingoes (11–8). Olean's Jake Weimer won the league batting title, hitting .461 and also led the league with 3 home runs. Pitcher Tom Fleming of Olean led the Interstate League with 6 wins.

=== Interstate League 1914 to 1916 ===
The Olean "Refiners" rejoined the six team, Class D Interstate League, which reformed in 1914. The Bradford Drillers, Hornell Green Sox, Jamestown Giants, Warren Bingoes and Wellsville Rainmakers joined Olean in beginning league play on May 22, 1914.

In returning to league play, the Refiners ended the Class D level Interstate League season in fourth place in the six–team league. With a record of 43–53, Olean was managed by Harry Giles and Joe Reynolds. In the final standings, the Refiners finished 14.5 games behind the first place Jamestown Giants. The Refiners did not qualify for the playoff, which was won by Jamestown, defeating Bradford.

In 1915, the Olean "White Sox" continued Class D level Interstate League play and had a contentious tie in the league final standings. The White Sox ended the season with a 52–30 record (.634) and in a statistical tie with the Wellsville Rainmakers, who finished 54–32 (.628). Wellsville had captured the second half title of the split season schedule and Olean had captured the first half title. Bill Colligan of Olean led the league in hitting, batting .322. Following the conclusion of the regular season, Olean refused to engage in a playoff with Wellsville. Olean's claim was that Jamestown's second half games played should have been thrown out for failing to complete the schedule and Olean should have won both halves of the split season schedule. The Olean claim was denied by the league and the title was awarded to Wellsville.

In their final season of Interstate League play, the 1916 Olean White Sox folded during the season. On July 12, 1916, the White Sox had a record of 16–25 when the franchise folded. Gus Dondon had returned as the Olean manager.

The Interstate League did not return to play in 1917. Olean next hosted minor league baseball with the 1939 Olean Oilers, who began play as members of the Class D level Pennsylvania–Ontario–New York League.

== The ballpark ==
The Olean teams hosted home Interstate League minor league games at the Athletic Grounds. The ballpark was located at Higgins Avenue & Main Street in Olean. The ballpark was called "Interstate League Park" in the minor league era. Today, the site location is commercial property

== Timeline ==
Year(s)	# Yrs.	Team	Level	League	Ballpark
1905–1907	3	Olean Refiners	Class D	Interstate League	Interstate League Park
1908	1	Olean Candidates	Class D	Interstate League	Interstate League Park
1914	1	Olean Refiners	Class D	Interstate League	Interstate League Park
1915-1916	1	Olean White Sox	Class D	Interstate League	Interstate League Park

== Year–by–year records ==
Year	Record	Finish	Manager	Playoffs/notes
1905	54–50	3rd	Al Lawson / Eddie Foster	No playoffs held
1906	50–62	7th	John Ziegler / John Dailey	No playoffs held
1907	12–35	NA	Joe Flynn	Team folded July 18
1908	16–2	1st	Percy Stetler	League champions League folded June 5
1914	43–53	4th	Harry Giles / Joe Reynolds	Did Not qualify
1915	52–30	1st (tie)	Gus Dundon	Won first half title Olean refused to play in playoff
1916	16–25	NA	Gus Dundon	Team folded July 12

== Notable alumni ==
- Gus Dundon (1915-1916, MGR)
- Tom Fleming (1908)
- Ray Kennedy (1915)
- Al Lawson (1905, MGR)
- Kid McLaughlin (1914-1916)
- Jake Weimer (1908)

== See also ==
Olean Refiners players
Olean Candidates players
Olean White Sox players
