= Lefty Webb =

American baseball player (1885–1958)

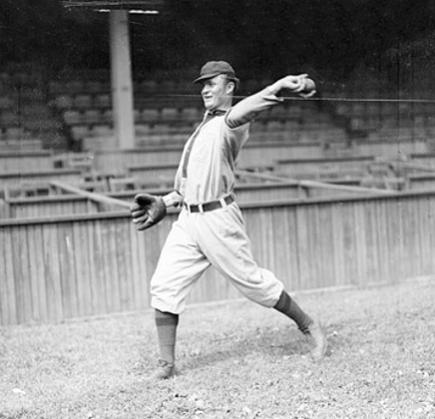
- Pitcher
- Born: March 1, 1885; Mount Gilead, Ohio, U.S.
- Died: January 12, 1958 (aged 72); Circleville, Ohio, U.S.
- Batted: Switch Threw: Left

MLB debut
- May 23, 1910, for the Pittsburgh Pirates

Last MLB appearance
- August 5, 1910, for the Pittsburgh Pirates

MLB statistics
- Win–loss record: 2–1
- Earned run average: 5.67
- Strikeouts: 6
- Stats at Baseball Reference

Teams
- Pittsburgh Pirates (1910)

Lefty Webb (March 1, 1885 – January 12, 1958) was an American baseball player for the Pittsburgh Pirates in 1910. His full name is Cleon Earl Webb. He was a switch hitter and threw left-handed. He was 5'11 and 165 pounds. He went to Ohio Wesleyan University. He was born on March 1, 1885, in Mount Gilead, Ohio. He died on January 12, 1958, in Circleville, Ohio.
