= Art Goodwin =

American baseball player (1876-1943)

- Pitcher
- Born: February 27, 1877; Whiteley Township, Pennsylvania
- Died: June 19, 1943 (aged 67); Franklin Township, Pennsylvania
- Batted: Unknown Threw: Right

MLB debut
- October 7, 1905, for the New York Highlanders

Last MLB appearance
- October 7, 1905, for the New York Highlanders

MLB statistics
- Win–loss record: 0–0
- Earned run average: 81.00
- Strikeouts: 0
- Stats at Baseball Reference

Teams
- New York Highlanders (1905)

Arthur Ingram Goodwin (February 27, 1876 – June 19, 1943) was a Major League Baseball pitcher. Goodwin played for the New York Highlanders in 1905. In one career game, he had a 0–0 record with an 81.00 ERA. He threw right-handed.

Goodwin was born in Whiteley Township, Pennsylvania. Goodwin later served as an assistant secretary for the Monongahela Railway's YMCA in Brownsville, Pennsylvania. Goodwin died at Greene County Memorial Hospital in Franklin Township, Greene County, Pennsylvania on June 19, 1943.
