= Elmer Bliss =

American baseball player (1875–1962)

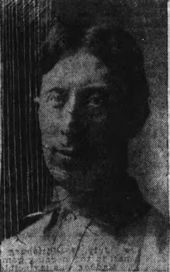
- Pitcher / Outfielder
- Born: March 9, 1875; Penfield, Pennsylvania, U.S.
- Died: March 18, 1962 (aged 87); Bradford, Pennsylvania, U.S.
- Batted: Left Threw: Right

MLB debut
- September 28, 1903, for the New York Highlanders

Last MLB appearance
- May 11, 1904, for the New York Highlanders

MLB statistics
- Win–loss record: 1–0
- Earned run average: 0.00
- Strikeouts: 3
- Stats at Baseball Reference

Teams
- New York Highlanders (1903–1904)

Elmer Ward Bliss (March 9, 1875 – March 18, 1962) was an American Major League Baseball pitcher and outfielder. Bliss played for the New York Highlanders in 1903 and 1904. In 1903, Bliss, as a pitcher, played in 1 game and got the win, going 7 innings with one run allowed. Then in 1904, Bliss appeared in a game for the Highlanders as an outfielder. He went 0–1 in the game. He batted left and threw left-handed.

== Biography ==
A former oil and ironworker, Bliss made his professional baseball debut in 1900, joining the Atlantic League, a successor of the Pennsylvania State League, playing as a shortstop. However, the league folded at the end of the 1900 season and he joined local teams in the Southern Tier of New York while living in Bolivar, New York. After impressing other teams, the Utica Pent-Ups signed Bliss for the 1901 season. After playing for the Pent-Ups from 1901–1903, the Highlanders purchased his contract in August 1903.

After his appearances for the Highlanders, Bliss ended up with the Baltimore Orioles of the Eastern League in 1904. In 1905 he played for the Montreal Royals and the Rochester Bronchos. Late in the 1905 season, the Chicago White Sox purchased Bliss' contract. For the 1906–1908 seasons, Bliss served as the manager for the Grand Rapids Wolverines of the Central League. After the 1908 season, the White Sox sold him to the Montgomery Climbers, where he played until his retirement after the 1911 season.

After retiring, Bliss returned to the oil business and started working in real estate, moving to Bradford, Pennsylvania in 1915, where he started his own insurance business. Bliss retired from the insurance business in 1957. He died on March 18, 1962 at Bradford Hospital, aged 87.
