= Tom Fleming (baseball) =

American baseball player (1873–1957)

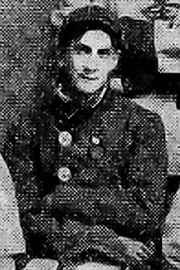
- Outfielder
- Born: November 20, 1873; Philadelphia, Pennsylvania, U.S.
- Died: December 26, 1957 (aged 84); Boston, Massachusetts, U.S.
- Batted: Left Threw: Left

MLB debut
- September 19, 1899, for the New York Giants

Last MLB appearance
- May 4, 1904, for the Philadelphia Phillies

MLB statistics
- Batting average: .222
- Home runs: 0
- Runs batted in: 6
- Stats at Baseball Reference

Teams
- New York Giants (1899); Philadelphia Phillies (1902, 1904)

Thomas Vincent Fleming (November 20, 1873 – December 26, 1957), nicknamed "Sleuth", was an American professional baseball player. He played parts of three seasons in Major League Baseball, primarily as an outfielder. His minor league baseball career spanned seventeen seasons, from 1894 until 1910.
