= Corning Royals =

- 1951–1969; (1951–1960, 1968–1969); Corning (city), New York

Minor league affiliations
- Previous classes: Short-Season A (1968–1969); Class D (1951–1960)
- League: New York–Penn League (1957–1960, 1968–1969)
- Previous leagues: Penn.-Ontario-New York League (1951–1960)

Major league affiliations
- Previous teams: Kansas City Royals (1968–1969); Boston Red Sox (1954–1960); Philadelphia Athletics (1951–1952)

Minor league titles
- League titles (1): (1954)

Team data
- Previous names: Corning Royals (1968–1969); Corning Red Sox (1960); Corning Cor-Sox (1959); Corning Red Sox (1954–1958); Corning Independents (1953); Corning Athletics (1951–1952)
- Previous parks: Corning Memorial Stadium

The Corning Royals were a minor league baseball team located in Corning, New York. The team played in the New York–Penn League. Their home stadium was Corning Memorial Stadium.

In contrast to most other New York–Penn teams, the Corning franchise never developed its own brand or identity, always naming itself after its parent club; even in the one year the team had no major league affiliation, instead of establishing a name for itself, it simply referred to itself as the Independents.

== History ==
The team was first founded in 1951 as the Corning Athletics or Corning A's as an affiliate of the Philadelphia Athletics. In 1953 the team had no major league affiliation (though it had a limited working agreement with the Cleveland Indians) and was called the Corning Independents. However the team began and affiliation with the Boston Red Sox and were known as the Corning Red Sox each year until 1960, with the exception of 1959, when they were named the Corning Cor-Sox.

The team then went inactive until 1968 when the city became an affiliate of the expansion Kansas City Royals, and was named the Corning Royals before folding again in 1969.

== Notable alumni ==
- Galen Cisco (1958)
- Ken McBride (1955) 3 x MLB All-Star
- Bill Monbouquette (1955-1956) 4 x MLB All-Star
- Paul Splittorff (1968) MLB All-Star
- Glenn Wright (1955, MGR)
