= Petie Behan =

American baseball player (1887-1957)

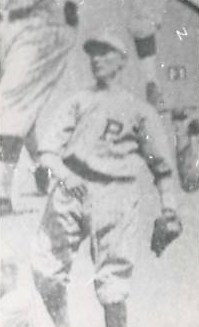
- Pitcher
- Born: December 11, 1887; Dallas, Pennsylvania, U.S.
- Died: January 22, 1957 (aged 69); Bradford, Pennsylvania, U.S.
- Batted: Right Threw: Right

MLB debut
- September 16, 1921, for the Philadelphia Phillies

Last MLB appearance
- September 26, 1923, for the Philadelphia Phillies

MLB statistics
- Record: 7-15
- ERA: 4.76
- Strikeouts: 43
- Stats at Baseball Reference

Teams
- Philadelphia Phillies (1921–1923)

Charles Frederick "Petie" Behan (December 11, 1887 – January 22, 1957) was an American Major League Baseball pitcher. Behan played for the Guelph Maple Leafs circa 1913, and for the Philadelphia Phillies from 1921 to 1923. He batted and threw right-handed.

Behan was born in Dallas, Pennsylvania and died in Bradford, Pennsylvania.
