= DuBois Miners =

- 1905–1907; DuBois, Pennsylvania

Minor league affiliations
- Class: Class D (1905–1907)
- League: Interstate League (1905–1907)

Major league affiliations
- Team: None

Minor league titles
- League titles (0): None

Team data
- Name: DuBois Miners (1905–1907)
- Ballpark: City Park (1905–1907)

The DuBois Miners were a minor league baseball team based in DuBois, Pennsylvania. From 1905 to 1907, the Miners played as members of the Class D level Interstate League. In their three seasons of play, the Dubois Miners hosted home minor league games at City Park.

== History ==
In 1905, DuBios began minor league play, with the DuBois "Miners" becoming members of the six–team Class D level Interstate League during the season. The Bradford Drillers, Coudersport Giants, Erie Fishermen, Jamestown Hill Climbers, Kane Mountaineers and Olean Refiners began league play on April 25, 1905.

On, July 12, 1905, the Jamestown Hill Climbers of the Interstate League moved to DuBois with an 18–23 record. After compiling a 22-37 record while based in DuBois, the Miners ended the 1905 season in last place, with an overall record of 40–60. The Miners placed sixth in the Interstate League standings, with Harry Knight and John Lawley serving as managers. In the final standings, the Coudersport Giants finished 1.0 game ahead of the second place Erie Fisherman (58–39), followed by The Olean Refiners (54–50), Bradford Drillers (46–54), Kane Mountaineers (40–56) and Jamestown Hill Climbers/DuBois Miners (40–60) followed in the standings.

The DuBois Miners continued play in 1906 and ended the Class D level Interstate League season in fifth place in the eight–team league. With a record of 52–52, the Miners were managed by Jimmie Breen and Bunny Larkin. In the final standings, the Miners finished 12.0 games behind the first place Erie Fisherman.

In their final season, the 1907 Miners folded during the season. On August 5, 1907, the Miners franchise folded. After beginning play in the eight–team league, the DuBois Miners ended their 1907 season with a record of 36–26. Bunny Larkin again served as manager.

The Interstate League continued play in 1908, but the Miners did not rejoin as a league franchise. DuBois has not hosted another minor league team.

== The ballpark ==
The DuBois Miners hosted home minor league games at City Park. The ballpark was located at Liberty Boulevard & Parkway Drive. City Park is still in use today as a public park containing the city pool.

== Timeline ==
Year(s)	# Yrs.	Team	Level	League	Ballpark
1905–1907	3	DuBois Miners	Class D	Interstate League	City Park

== Year–by–year records ==
Year	Record	Finish	Manager	Playoffs/notes
1905	40–60	6th	Lawrence Alexander / Menzo Sibley / Paul Wrath	Jamestown (18–23) moved to DuBois July 12
1906	52–52	5th	Jimmie Breen / Bunny Larkin	No playoffs held
1907	36–26	NA	Bunny Larkin	Team folded August 5

== Notable alumni ==
- Bunny Larkin (1906–1907, MGR)
- Doc Martell (1906–1907)
- Herbie Moran (1906)
- John W. Weimer (1907)
- DuBois Miners players
