= Jake Weimer =

American baseball player (1873–1928)

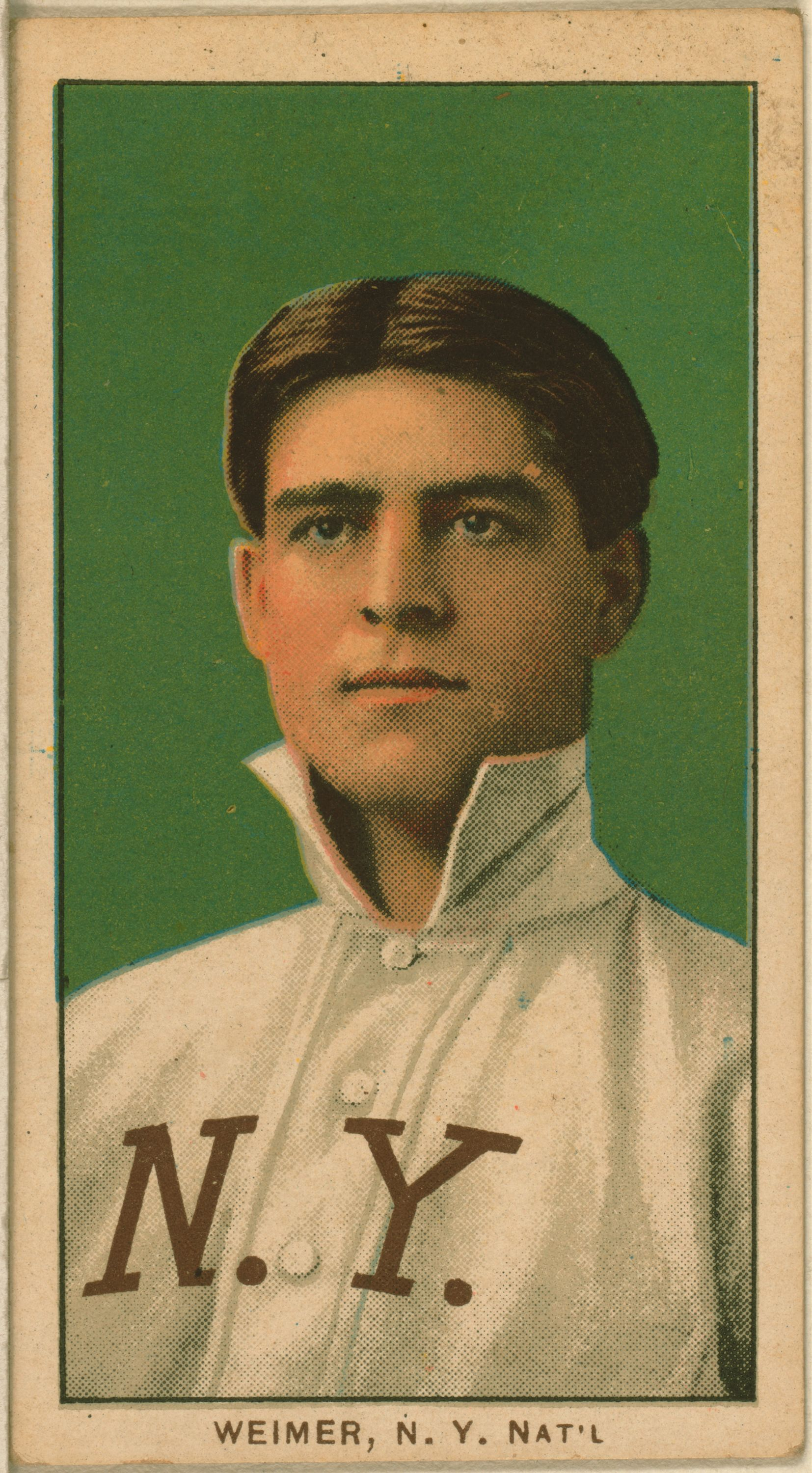
- Jake Weimer baseball card
- Pitcher
- Born: November 29, 1873; Ottumwa, Iowa, U.S.
- Died: June 19, 1928 (aged 54); Chicago, Illinois, U.S.
- Batted: Right Threw: Left

MLB debut
- April 17, 1903, for the Chicago Cubs

Last MLB appearance
- May 28, 1909, for the New York Giants

MLB statistics
- Win–loss record: 97–69
- Earned run average: 2.23
- Strikeouts: 657
- Stats at Baseball Reference

Teams
- Chicago Cubs (1903–1905); Cincinnati Reds (1906–1908); New York Giants (1909)

Jacob Weimer, nicknamed "Tornado Jake" (November 29, 1873 – June 19, 1928), was an American professional baseball player. He played in Major League Baseball as a left-handed pitcher for the Chicago Cubs (1903–1905), Cincinnati Reds (1906–1908) and New York Giants (1909). He batted right-handed and threw left-handed.

Weimer was born in Ottumwa, Iowa. He toiled for eight years in the minor leagues, before becoming one of the top left-handers in baseball.

In a seven-season career, Weimer posted a 97–69 record with 657 strikeouts and a 2.23 ERA in 1472 2/3 innings pitched. His career ERA ranks 14th all-time, 10th among post-1900 pitchers.

He was also a good hitting pitcher in the majors, posting a .213 batting average (115-for-540) with 46 runs, one home run and 36 RBI.

Weimer emerged as one of the Chicago Cubs' top starting pitchers in the first part of the 20th century. He went 21–9 with a 2.30 ERA in his 1903 rookie season and 20–14 with 1.91 in his sophomore year. After going 18–12 with 2.26 in 1905, he was sent to the Cincinnati Reds for third baseman Harry Steinfeldt and Jimmy Sebring before 1906. In a trade that benefited both teams, Steinfeld hit .327 to lead the Cubs to their first World Series and Weimer won 20 games for Cincinnati, but eventually faded and was sent to the New York Giants after two subpar seasons. He played his final game with the Giants in 1909.

Weimer died in Chicago, at the age of 54.
