= Frank Shaughnessy =

American athlete and sports executive (1883–1969)

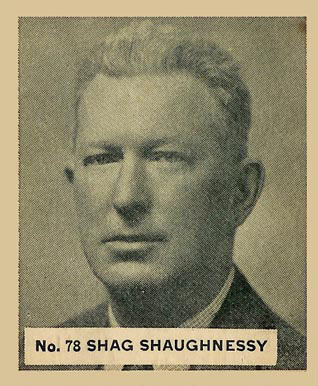

Biographical details
- Born: April 8, 1883; Amboy, Illinois, U.S.
- Died: May 15, 1969 (aged 85); Montreal, Quebec, Canada

Playing career
- 1901–1904: Notre Dame
- Positions: End, OF/C

Coaching career (HC unless noted)

Football
- 1907: Clemson
- 1909: Washington & Lee (freshmen)
- 1912–27, 1932–34: McGill
- 1915: Ottawa Rough Riders

Baseball
- 1907: Clemson
- 1909–1911: Roanoke Tigers
- 1912: Fort Wayne Railroaders
- 1913–1915: Ottawa Senators
- 1916: Warren Warriors
- 1913–1915: Hamilton Tigers
- 1921–1925: Syracuse Stars
- 1925: Newark Bears
- 1926: Reading Keystones
- 1928: Detroit Tigers (asst.)
- 1934–1936: Montreal Royals

Ice hockey
- 1914–1916: Ottawa Senators (manager)
- 1919–1927: McGill (men)
- ?: McGill (women)

Administrative career (AD unless noted)
- 1932–1934: Montreal Royals (GM)
- 1936–1960: International League (president)

Accomplishments and honors

Awards
- Canadian Football Hall of Fame (1963); Canadian Baseball Hall of Fame (1983)

Shag Shaughnessy
- Centerfielder
- Batted: Left Threw: Right

MLB debut
- April 17, 1905, for the Washington Senators

Last MLB appearance
- July 22, 1908, for the Philadelphia Athletics

MLB statistics
- Batting average: .281
- Games: 9
- Runs batted in: 1
- Stats at Baseball Reference

Teams
- As player: Washington Senators (1905); Philadelphia Athletics (1908)

Member of the Canadian

Baseball Hall of Fame
- Induction: 1983

Francis Joseph "Shag" Shaughnessy (April 8, 1883 – May 15, 1969) was an American athlete and sports executive. Shaughnessy played both baseball and football and was an executive in baseball, football and ice hockey. He was born in the United States and moved to Canada in the 1910s, where he was involved with football and ice hockey teams in Montreal and Ottawa. He was later president of the International League of baseball. His son Frank Shaughnessy Jr. also played football and ice hockey, and played ice hockey for the United States in the 1936 Winter Olympics.

== College ==
Shaughnessy played football and baseball at the University of Notre Dame from 1901 to 1904, serving as football captain his senior year.

== Baseball ==
Shaughnessy had brief Major League baseball appearances with the Washington Senators in 1905 and the Philadelphia Athletics in 1908.

Shaughnessy was a minor league manager for 19 years between 1909 and 1936, compiling a 1148–1012 record. He was General Manager of the Montreal Royals from 1932 to 1934, and a coach for the Detroit Tigers in 1928. He served as President of the International League from 1936 to 1960, and invented a playoff system known as the Shaughnessy playoffs. In, 1947, he was inducted into the International League Hall of Fame, and in 1953 he was presented with the King of Baseball award given by Minor League Baseball.

== Football ==
He introduced the option play to American football while coaching at Yale University and Cornell University. He also was football and baseball coach at Clemson University, and football coach at Washington and Lee University.

Shaughnessy was the first professional coach hired in Canadian university football and his full-time appointment at Montreal's McGill University in 1912 was not well received by the other teams in the league.

In each of his first two years, McGill won the Yates Cup football championship. He coached McGill to a 34–34–2 regular season record in 17 seasons. The 34 victories stood until 1979 as the most by a McGill football coach.

Shaughnessy played baseball during the summer in Ottawa, where he met his wife. He became involved in Ottawa sports, and was coach of the Ottawa Rough Riders for the 1915 season.

A football innovator, Shaughnessy introduced the forward pass to Canadian university football when McGill played Syracuse University in an experimental game held on November 5, 1921, at Percival Molson Memorial Stadium in Montreal. In spite of this, the forward pass was not officially allowed in Canadian football rules until 1929. He was the first football coach in Canada to introduce "X" and "Y" strategic formations and "secondary defence".

In 1969, the Shaughnessy Cup was first presented for the rivalry between McGill and Loyola College. Since 1975, the Cup has been fought for between McGill and Concordia University.

Shaughnessy was inducted as a builder into the Canadian Football Hall of Fame in 1963, the Canadian Baseball Hall of Fame in 1983, its inaugural induction year, and the McGill University Sports Hall of Fame in 1997.

== Ice hockey ==
While living in Ottawa, Shaughnessy served from 1914 until 1916 as the manager of the Ottawa Senators.

Shaughnessy coached the McGill women's hockey team and was appointed men's hockey coach in 1919, guiding the Redmen to a 61–56–2 record until stepping down in 1927. The 61 victories established a McGill record and since then, has only been surpassed by four other McGill hockey coaches.

Preceded by Warren Giles	International League president 1937–1960	Succeeded by Tommy Richardson
