= Hornell Dodgers (minor league) =

- 1950–1956; (1890, 1904–1906, 1914–1915, 1942–1957); Hornell, New York

Minor league affiliations
- Previous classes: Independent (1890, 1904–1905); Class D (1906, 1914–1915, 1942–1957)
- Previous leagues: Western New York League (1890); Southern Tier League (1904–1905); Interstate League (1906, 1914–1915); Pennsylvania–Ontario–New York League (1942–1957)

Major league affiliations
- Previous teams: Cincinnati Redlegs (1957); Brooklyn Dodgers (1950–1956); Boston Red Sox (1949); Pittsburgh Pirates (1942–1947)

Minor league titles
- League titles: 1 (1951)

Team data
- Previous names: Hornell Redlegs (1957); Hornell Dodgers (1950–1956); Hornell Maple Leafs (1948–1949); Hornell Maples (1942–1947); Hornell Maple Leafs (1915); Hornell Green Sox (1914); Hornell Pigmies (1906); Hornellsville Bluebirds (1905); Hornellsville Maple Cities (1904); Hornell (1890)

The Hornell Dodgers (previously the Hornell Maples and Hornell Maple Leafs) was a minor league baseball team based in Hornell, New York that played in the Pennsylvania–Ontario–New York League between 1942 and 1957.

Previously, Hornell teams played as members of the Southern Tier League (1904–1905) and Interstate League (1906, 1914–1915) after the first Hornell team played as members of the 1890 Western New York League.

After the team disbanded in 1956, the Bradford Beagles disbanded on May 23, 1957, and were replaced on May 28, 1957, by the Hornell Redlegs.

== Notable alumni ==
- Tommy Davis (1956) 3x MLB All-Star; 2x NL Batting Title (1962–1963)
- Charlie Neal (1950) 3x MLB All-Star
- Phil Seghi (1947)
- Maury Wills (1951–1952) 7x MLB All-Star; 1962 NL Most Valuable Player
- Frankie Zak (1942) MLB All-Star
- Don Zimmer (1950) 2x MLB All-Star; 1989 NL Manager of the Year
