= National Register of Historic Places listings in Warren County, Pennsylvania =

Location of Warren County in Pennsylvania

This is a list of the National Register of Historic Places listings in Warren County, Pennsylvania.

This is intended to be a complete list of the properties and districts on the National Register of Historic Places in Warren County, Pennsylvania, United States. The locations of National Register properties and districts for which the latitude and longitude coordinates are included below, may be seen in a map.

There are 11 properties and districts listed on the National Register in the county. Another property was once listed but has been removed.

This National Park Service list is complete through NPS recent listings posted May 1, 2026.

== Current listings ==
	Name on the Register	Image	Date listed	Location	City or town	Description
1	Cornplanter Grant		May 14, 2018 (#100002403)	Allegheny Reservoir; 41°56′42″N 78°56′06″W	Elk Township	Indian reservation; mostly submerged by the creation of the reservoir
2	A.J. Hazeltine House	A.J. Hazeltine House	November 21, 1976 (#76001677)	710 Pennsylvania Avenue, West; 41°50′43″N 79°09′24″W	Warren	
3	Irvine United Presbyterian Church	Irvine United Presbyterian Church	August 27, 1976 (#76001676)	Off U.S. Route 6; 41°50′17″N 79°16′16″W	Brokenstraw Township	
4	Guy C. Irvine House	Guy C. Irvine House	September 13, 1978 (#78002479)	1.5 miles (2.4 km) south of Russell on U.S. Route 62; 41°55′12″N 79°09′04″W	Pine Grove Township	
5	John P. Jefferson House	John P. Jefferson House	May 9, 1985 (#85000996)	119 Market Street; 41°50′41″N 79°08′45″W	Warren	
6	Struthers Library Building	Struthers Library Building	October 10, 1975 (#75001671)	3rd Avenue and Liberty Street; 41°50′48″N 79°08′55″W	Warren	
7	Warren Armory	Warren Armory	May 9, 1991 (#91000519)	330 Hickory Street; 41°50′49″N 79°08′52″W	Warren	
8	Warren County Courthouse	Warren County Courthouse	April 18, 1977 (#77001198)	Market Street and 4th Avenue; 41°50′55″N 79°08′50″W	Warren	
9	Warren Historic District	Warren Historic District	July 22, 1999 (#99000877)	Roughly bounded by Conewango Creek, the Allegheny River, 7th Avenue and Laurel Street; 41°50′57″N 79°08′50″W	Warren	
10	Wetmore House	Wetmore House	April 28, 1975 (#75001672)	210 4th Avenue; 41°50′54″N 79°08′52″W	Warren	
11	Woman's Club of Warren	Woman's Club of Warren	June 28, 1996 (#96000715)	310 Market Street; 41°50′52″N 79°08′46″W	Warren	

== Former listing ==
	Name on the Register	Image	Date listed	Date removed	Location	City or town	Description
1	Pennsylvania Railroad Passenger Station		November 19, 1974 (#74001804)	May 8, 1986	316 Chestnut Street	Warren	

== See also ==
- List of National Historic Landmarks in Pennsylvania
- National Register of Historic Places listings in Pennsylvania
- List of Pennsylvania state historical markers in Warren County
