= Warren Historic District (Warren, Pennsylvania) =

Historic district in Pennsylvania, United States

- U.S. National Register of Historic Places
- U.S. Historic district
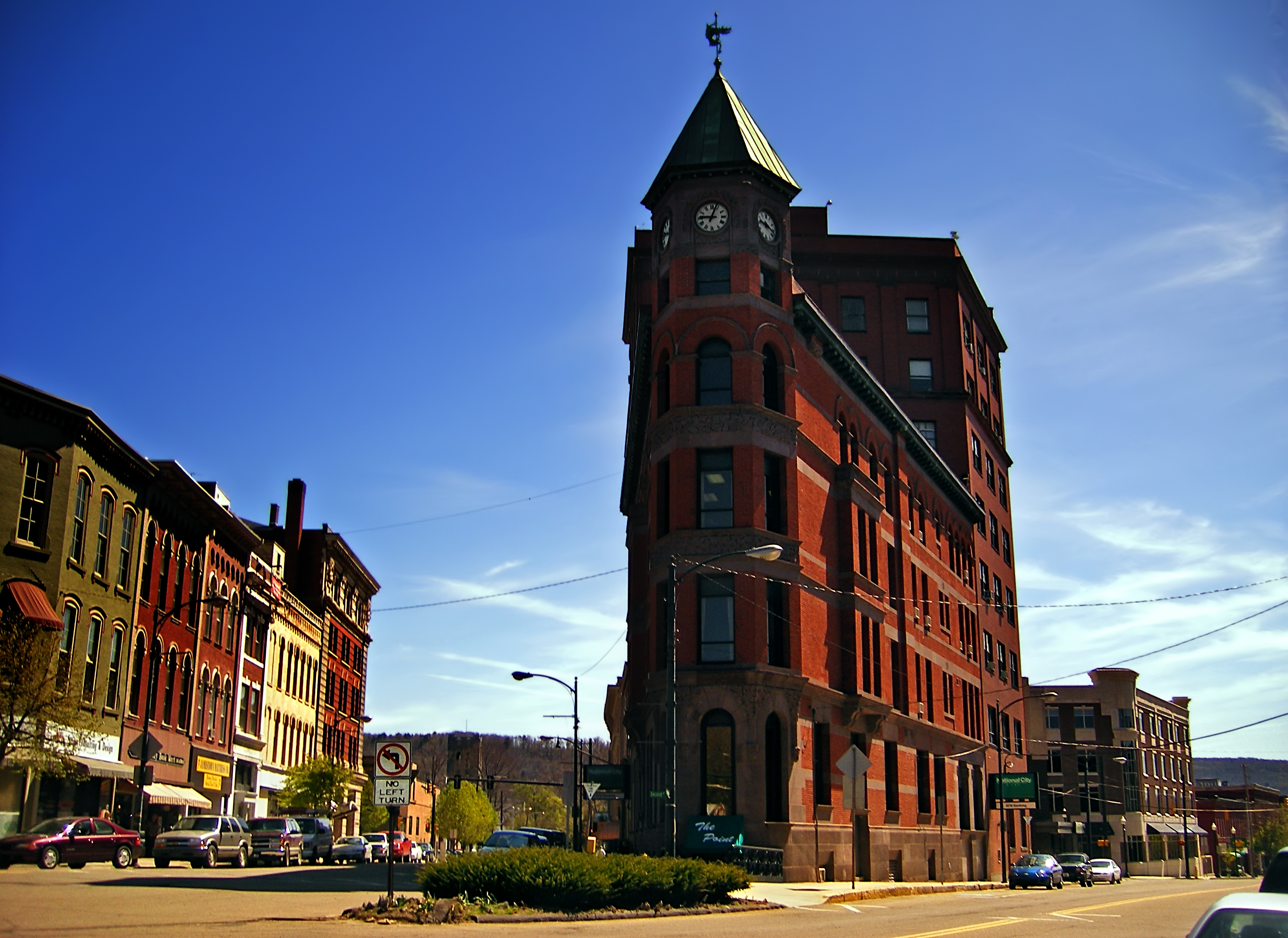
- National City Bank Building (1891) in the Warren Historic District, May 2007

- Location within Pennsylvania Location within the United States
- Location: Roughly bounded by Conewango Creek, the Allegheny River, 7th Avenue and Laurel Street, Warren, Pennsylvania
- Coordinates: 41°50′57″N 79°8′50″W
- Area: 441 acres (178 ha)
- Architect: Philips, Edward Albert; Wetmore, Charles D., et al.
- Architectural style: Greek Revival, Italianate, et al.
- MPS: Oil Industry Resources in Western Pennsylvania MPS
- NRHP reference No.: 99000877
- Added to NRHP: July 22, 1999

The Warren Historic District, is a national historic district that is located in Warren, Warren County, Pennsylvania.

It was added to the National Register of Historic Places in 1999.

== History and architectural features ==
This district includes 587 contributing buildings, five contributing sites, and three contributing objects that are located in the central business district and surrounding residential areas of Warren. The buildings were designed in a variety of popular architectural styles including Greek Revival and Italianate. Notable buildings include the flatiron National City Bank Building (1891), the Conewango Club, the Elks Club, Trinity Episcopal Church (1895-1896), First Presbyterian Church (1895-1896), and the former Swedish Lutheran Church (1916). The contributing objects are a bronze statue of General Joseph Warren (1912), the Soldiers and Sailors Monument (1909), and the Civil War memorial (1922).

Also located in the district but separately listed are the John P. Jefferson House, Struthers Library Building, Warren Armory, Warren County Courthouse, Wetmore House, and Woman's Club of Warren.

== Gallery ==
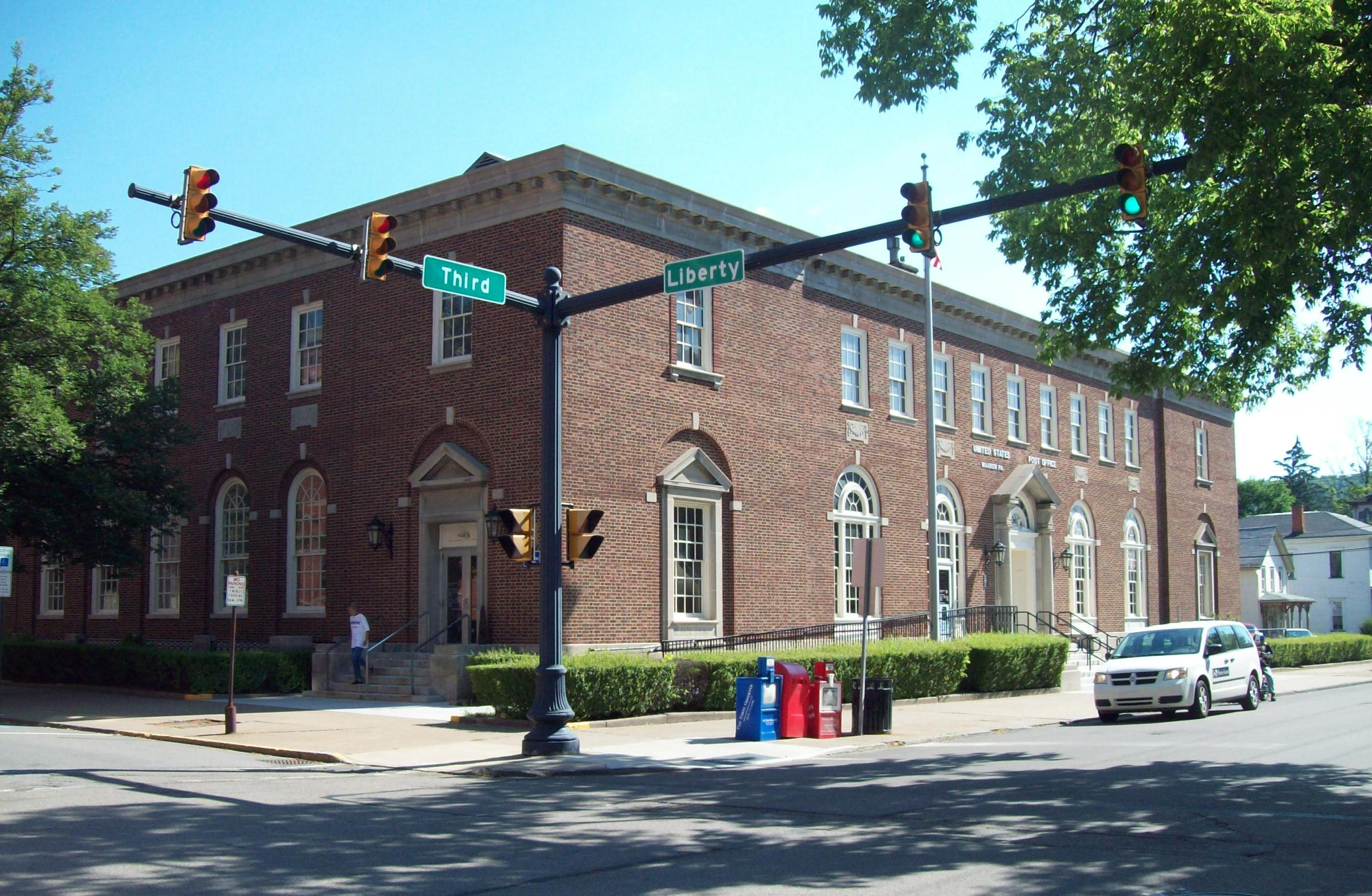
U.S. Post Office, July 2012

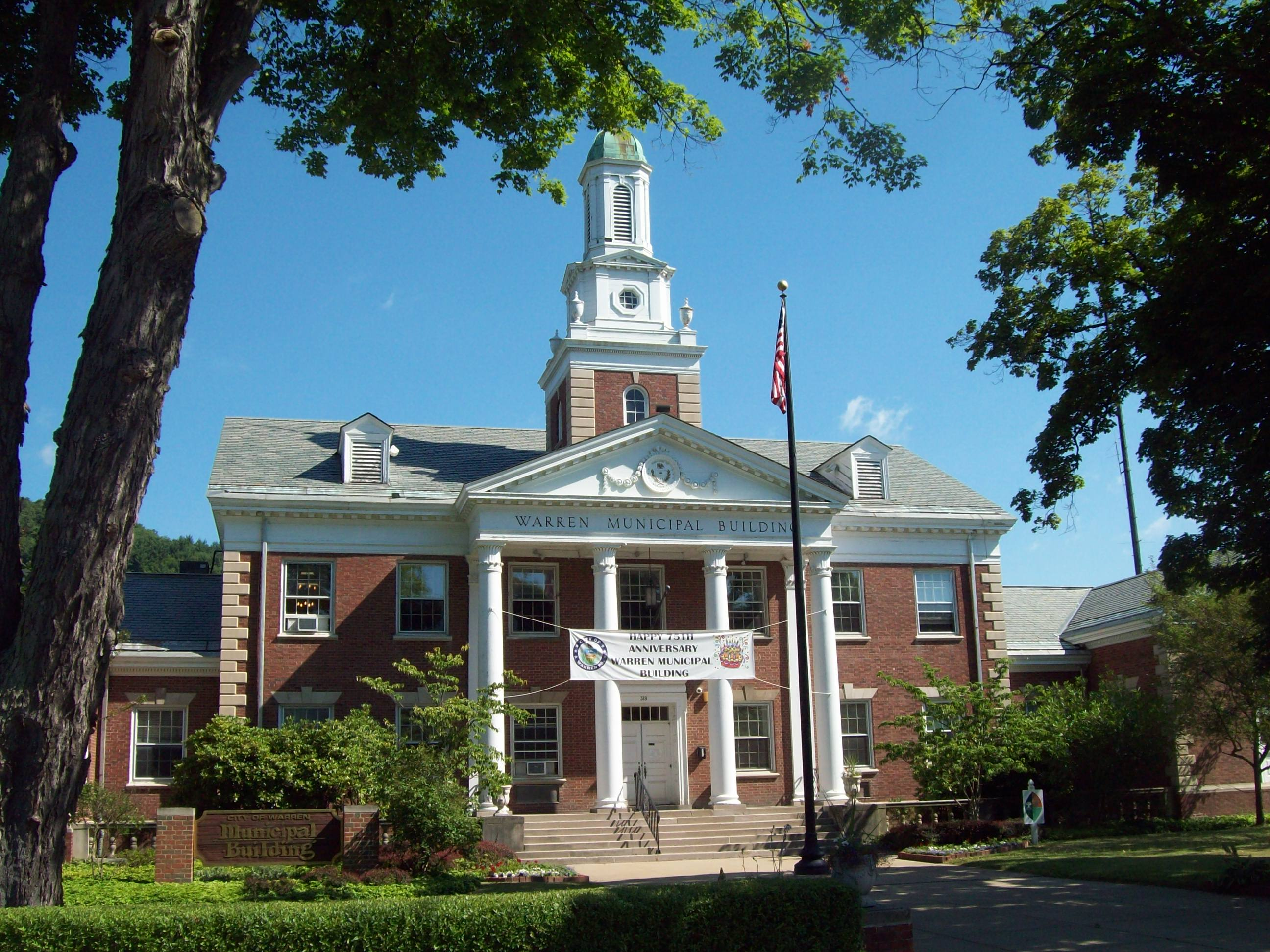
Warren Municipal Building, July 2012

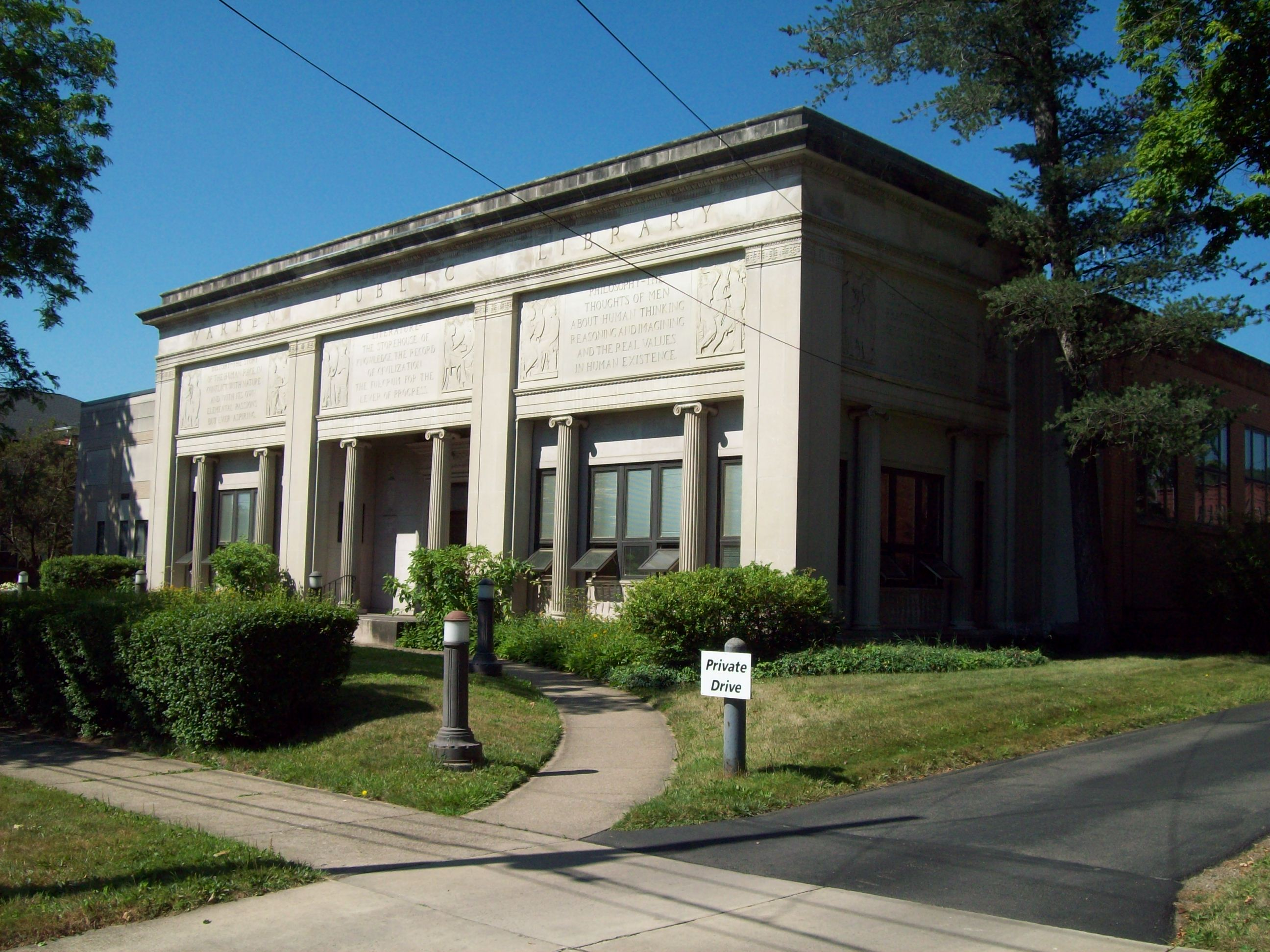
Warren Public Library, July 2012
