= John Leo Blair =

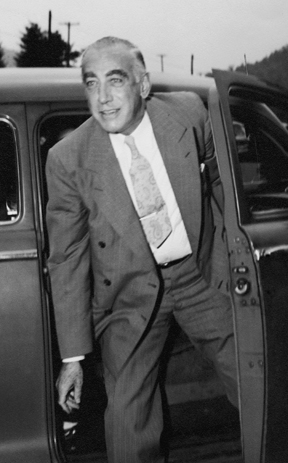
John L Blair

John Leo Blair (June 24, 1888 – 1962) was an American businessman. He was the founder of New Process Company, now the Blair Corporation – a direct market retail company. He was also an author, inventor, a promoter of direct marketing, and an advisor to President Franklin D. Roosevelt, and to Treasury Secretary, Henry Morgenthau Jr.

== Early life and education ==
John Leo Blair was born in Warren, Pennsylvania, on June 24, 1888. Blair graduated high school there in 1904 and later enrolled in a three-year law degree program at the University of Pennsylvania, located in Philadelphia, PA.

== Career ==
Robert Collier, the author of early self-help books, worked with John Blair in developing sales methods and effective copy writing. Collier wrote that John Blair "seemed to divine naturally what it takes most of us many years to learn, i.e. that regardless of what we have to offer, it is not merchandise that we are selling, but human nature, human reactions." Collier also wrote the preface for a book John Blair authored, entitled "The Book of Success."

=== His company ===
In 1910, during his second year at the university, John L. Blair received an offer from a classmate to sell raincoats during his Easter vacation. During a sales call, Blair was asked by an undertaker if he had an attractive, professional-looking black raincoat. This inspired Blair to take advantage of the relatively new process of rubber vulcanization to adhere an attractive black wool fabric to the outside of a rubber raincoat, with an inner lining of a Scottish plaid. His classmate agreed to begin producing just such a coat and supplied him initially with 1200 coats, which sold out.

With the help of his father and siblings, Blair mailed 10,000 letters to undertakers across America, then to ministers and businessmen. First called the New Process Rubber Company, by 1916 it was changed to New Process Company. Having gone public in 1924, New Process Company, and later Blair Corporation, is the oldest continuously-held stock on the American Stock Exchange.

=== The Great Depression ===
In 1927 New Process Company suffered a disastrous year. In a last-ditch effort, on the very last day of that year, the top six officers pitched in about $100,000 of their own money to stabilize the bottom line.

John L. Blair continued to pursue his law career while serving as president of his new-found company. It was because of his law career that he met and became good friends with Robert H. Jackson, and through Jackson, Blair met Franklin D. Roosevelt and Henry Morgenthau Jr.

Blair provided Roosevelt with ideas during his run for the presidency. Once Roosevelt was elected, John L. Blair was invited to Washington, DC, to confer with Henry Morgenthau Jr. on how the nation's economy could be rescued. John Blair and his wife were invited to the White House on at least two occasions to dine with the Roosevelts.

Morgenthau offered him a full-time position at the U.S. Treasury Department. Blair declined the offer as he felt it unethical to become a public servant, when already known as a direct marketer across America. For instance, at one point, one in every twenty Americans received advertising mailer from New Process Company, all with John L. Blair's handsome face and signature on them.

In November 1933, New Process Company caught fire. John L. Blair climbed a fireman's ladder with axe in hand to break out upper floor windows so that the water from the fire hoses could reach inside. The company was up and running again in only ten days. He slowly rebuilt his headquarters based on buildings he had seen while on vacation in Prague, Czechoslovakia.

John L. Blair served as president of his own company for 52 years, until his death in 1962. His son, John L. Blair Jr., continued for the next 25 years until the first non-family CEO was appointed and the name was changed from New Process Company to Blair Corporation. By the mid 1980s, New Process was also the largest direct-marketer of clothing and home products in the United States.

== Death and legacy ==
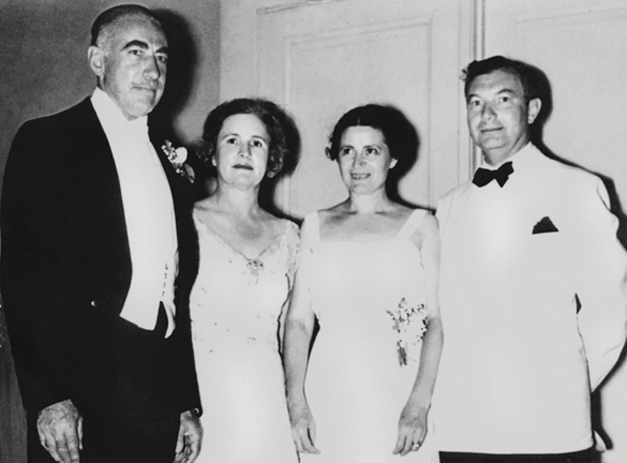
John and Maude Blair with Irene and Robert Jackson.

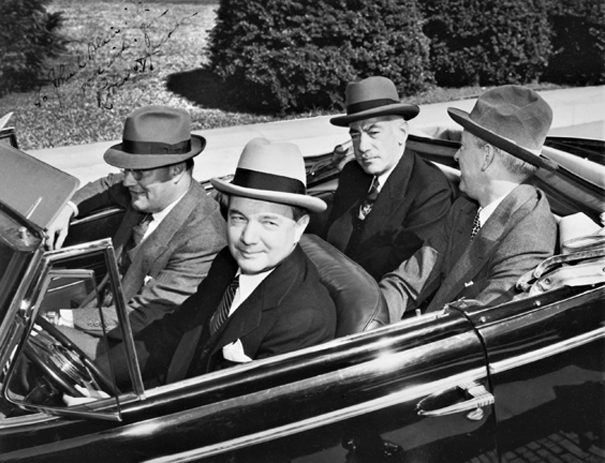
Jackson on his way to join the Supreme Court with John Blair in the backseat, October 6, 1941.

Blair died on 12 Mar 1962 (aged 73) in Warren County, Pennsylvania, USA

In 2010, in celebration of 100 years of operation, the company built a 3,500-square-foot (330 m^{2}) Blair Museum to honor him and past New Process Company employees.
