= William Guard =

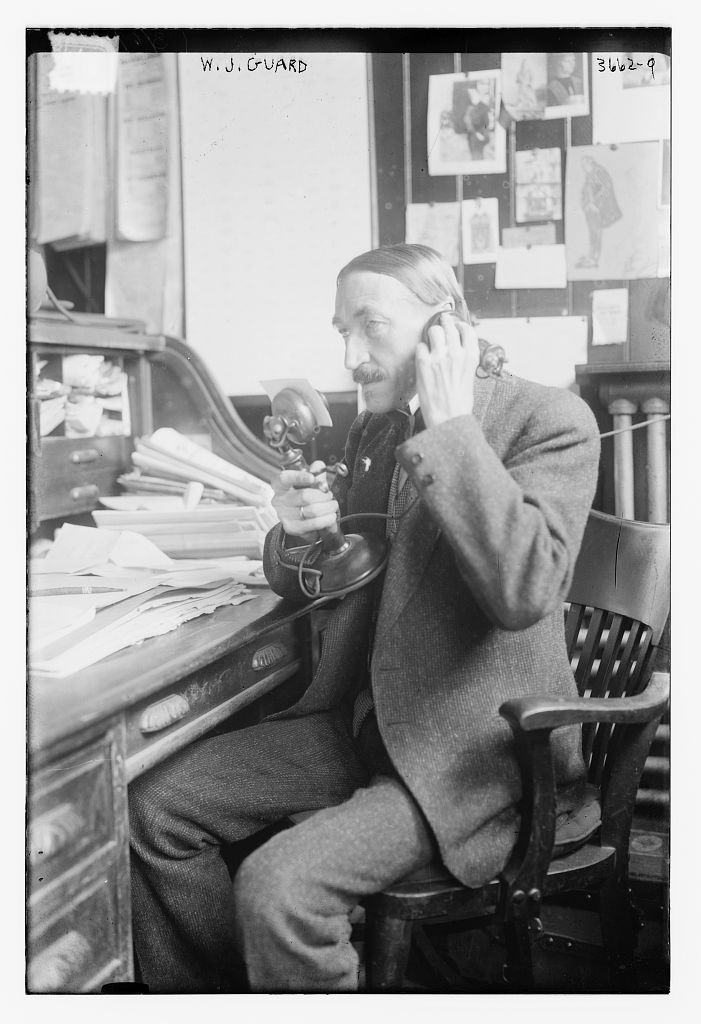
William J. Guard circa 1915

William J. Guard (March 29, 1862 – March 3, 1932) was an Irish-born American opera publicist.

== Biography ==
He was born in Limerick on March 29, 1862. Guard was brought to the United States as a child, later being educated there. He worked as a journalist for numerous important newspapers for some time, and was engaged by the Manhattan Opera Company as a press representative upon its organization in 1906. Upon the company's dissolution, he took a similar position with the Metropolitan Opera, remaining with the company until his death. He worked and lived in Paris during the early months of World War I, and recounted stories. In recognition for his activities on behalf of Italian singers he was awarded the Order of the Crown of Italy by the Italian government. Guard died in New York City on March 3, 1932.
