= List of Pennsylvania state historical markers in Warren County =

Location of Warren County in Pennsylvania

This is a list of the Pennsylvania state historical markers in Warren County.

This is intended to be a complete list of the official state historical markers placed in Warren County, Pennsylvania by the Pennsylvania Historical and Museum Commission (PHMC). The locations of the historical markers, as well as the latitude and longitude coordinates as provided by the PHMC's database, are included below when available. There are 12 historical markers located in Warren County.

== Historical markers ==
Marker title	Image	Date dedicated	Location	Marker type	Topics
Buckaloons		October 23, 1947	Buckaloons Park, near US 62, east of Irvine; 41.835550°N 79.257267°W	Roadside	Native American
Celoron's Expedition		October 23, 1947	Pennsylvania Avenue (Business US 6) at Hickory Street, Warren; 41.84482°N 79.14923°W	Roadside	Exploration, Government & Politics, Government & Politics 18th Century
Conewango		October 23, 1947	Pennsylvania Avenue (Business US 6), Conewango Creek Bridge (west side), Warren; 41.8437°N 79.14027°W	Roadside	Early Settlement, Native American
Cynthia Catlin Miller		November 2, 2019	881 Big Tree Rd. (Rt. 69), Sugar Grove, just south of New York border 41.99492°N 79.34309°W	Roadside	African American, Mansions & Manors, Underground Railroad, Women
Gen. William Irvine		October 23, 1947	National Forge Road near Bosko Street, Irvine; 41.83987°N 79.26173°W	Roadside	Professions & Vocations
Grandin Well, The		July 15, 1959	US 62, .4 mile south of Allegheny River Bridge (Buckingham Street) near Tidioute; 41.67693°N 79.41688°W	Roadside	Business & Industry, Oil & Gas
Handsome Lake		October 2, 1946	PA 59 at Cornplanter (Missing)	Roadside	Native American
Indian Paint Hill		October 23, 1947	US 62, 3 miles northeast of Tidioute; 41.7084°N 79.34907°W	Roadside	Native American
Robert Houghwout Jackson (1892-1954)		August 23, 1997	Garland-Spring Creek (PA 426) & Eldred Hill Roads, Spring Creek; 41.86705°N 79.51777°W	Roadside	Government & Politics, Government & Politics 20th Century
Seneca Crossing		November 3, 2007	Intersection of Scandia & Wigwam Roads, Glade Township; 41.888033°N 79.058667°W	Roadside	American Revolution, Exploration, Native American, Paths & Trails, Transportation
Sugar Run Mounds		October 2, 1946	PA 59 at Cornplanter (Missing)	Roadside	Native American
Thompson's Island		October 23, 1947	US 62, ~4 miles S of Irvine; 41.784067°N 79.282033°W	Roadside	American Revolution, Military, Native American
Warren County		March 12, 1981	County Courthouse, 4th Avenue at Market Street, Warren; 41.848117°N 79.147°W	City	Government & Politics, Government & Politics 19th Century

== See also ==
- List of Pennsylvania state historical markers
- National Register of Historic Places listings in Warren County, Pennsylvania
