= Warren Redskins =

- 1940–1941; Warren, Pennsylvania

Minor league affiliations
- Class: Class D
- League: Pennsylvania State Association

Major league affiliations
- Team: Cleveland Indians (1940)

Team data
- Name: Warren Buckeyes (1941); Warren Redskins (1940)

The Warren Redskins were a minor league baseball team located in Warren, Pennsylvania in 1940. The Redskins played in the Pennsylvania State Association and was affiliated with the Cleveland Indians. The following season the team changed it name the Warren Buckeyes and were unaffiliated. The team disbanded in 1941 and the league disbanded in 1942, due to the manning shortages associated with World War II.

== Notable alumni ==
- Earl Henry
- Alex McColl
- Saul Rogovin
