= Alice Isabel Hazeltine =

American librarian

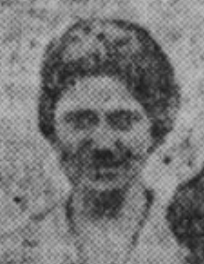
- Alice Isabel Hazeltine, from a 1921 newspaper
- Born: April 15, 1878; Warren County, Pennsylvania
- Died: May 30, 1959 (aged 81); New York City
- Occupations: Librarian, writer, editor

Alice Isabel Hazeltine (April 15, 1878 – May 30, 1959) was an American librarian, writer, and editor. She was on the faculty of the School of Library Service at Columbia University, and edited several collections of stories for children and teenagers, published in multiple editions through the twentieth century.

== Early life and education ==
Hazeltine was born in Warren, Pennsylvania, the daughter of William Vincent Hazeltine and Isabella McIntosh Hazeltine. Her father was a medical doctor. Having received her early education at Warren High School, she graduated from Syracuse University in 1901 and continued her studies at the New York State Library School from 1901 to 1902. She completed doctoral studies in 1929, with a dissertation titled A children's librarian in Europe (1929).

== Career ==
Hazeltine worked at the Carnegie Library in Pittsburgh, as first assistant in the children's department. She also worked at libraries in Buffalo, Providence and St. Louis. She taught summer library courses at Simmons College, and was assistant professor in the School of Library Service at Columbia University from 1927 to 1943, teaching courses on library work with children. A proponent of fairy tales, folk tales and storytelling events for children, she recommended books for home libraries and edited and co-edited several collections of traditional tales for children and teens, around holiday and other themes.

== Publications ==
- "Story-telling in the Carnegie Library of Pittsburgh" (1909)
- Christmas in Legend and Story: A Book for Boys and Girls (1915, co-editor, with Elva Sophronia Smith)
- "Methods of Training Children to Use the Library Intelligently" (1916)
- Library Work with Children (1917, editor)
- Plays for Children, an Annotated Index (1918)
- What is a Children's Librarian? (1921, pamphlet)
- How to Become a Children's Librarian (1927, pamphlet)
- "Development of traits of personality in children's librarians" (1927)
- Syllabus for the study of reading interests of children (1937)
- The Easter Book of Legends and Stories (1947, co-editor with Elva Sophronia Smith)
- Children's Stories to Read or Tell for Pleasure and Understanding (editor, 1949)
- Stories of Love (1951, co-editor with Elva Sophronia Smith)
- Selected Stories for Teen Agers, for Pleasure and Understanding (editor, 1952)
- We Grew Up in America (editor, 1954)
- The Year Around: Poems for Children (1956, co-editor with Elva Sophronia Smith)
- Red man, white man; legends, tales, and true accounts of the American Indians (editor, 1957)
- Below the Surface: Stories of Adventure Under Land and Water (1958)
- Hero Tales from Many Lands (1961, editor)

== Personal life ==
Hazeltine was well travelled, enjoying many associations in Europe and spent many holidays in Kennebunkport, Maine. She died in 1959, aged 81 years, in New York City. Her papers are the Butler Library at Columbia University.
