= Art Johnson (1920s pitcher) =

American baseball player (1897-1982)

- Pitcher
- Born: February 15, 1897; Warren, Pennsylvania, U.S.
- Died: June 7, 1982 (aged 85); Sarasota, Florida, U.S.
- Batted: Both Threw: Left

MLB debut
- September 18, 1927, for the New York Giants

Last MLB appearance
- September 18, 1927, for the New York Giants

MLB statistics
- Games pitched: 1
- Innings pitched: 3
- Earned run average: 0.00
- Stats at Baseball Reference

Teams
- New York Giants (1927)

Arthur Gilbert Johnson (February 15, 1897 – June 7, 1982) was an American pitcher in Major League Baseball. He played one game for the New York Giants in 1927.
