= David Beaty (businessman) =

19th century American businessman

David Beaty (26 October 1811 – 3 October 1889) was an American businessman who discovered oil at his home in Warren, Pennsylvania in 1875. He was reportedly searching for a deposit of natural gas that he could use to heat his home. After this discovery, Warren's economy became almost completely geared toward the production of oil, and later to the refining of oil.

== Legacy ==
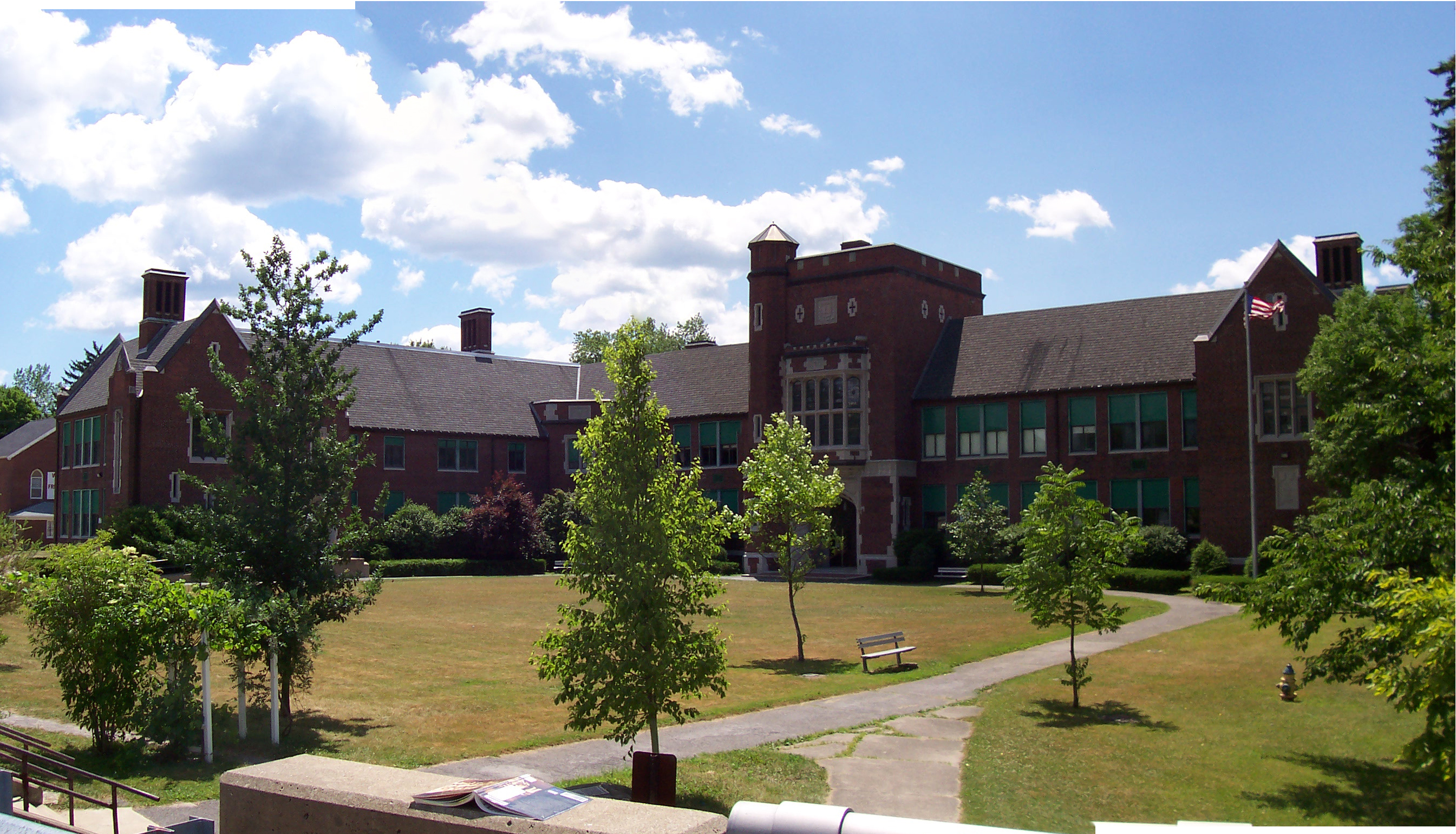
Beaty Middle School as it appeared in 2006. New windows have been added in late 2011/early 2012.

Warren still is home to Beaty Middle School, which operates partially on funds still available from David Beaty's estate.
