= Publicity =

Public visibility or awareness for any product, service, person or organization

In marketing, publicity is the public visibility or awareness for any product, service, person or organization. It may also refer to the movement of information from its source to the general public, often (but not always) via the media. The subjects of publicity include people of public recognition, goods and services, organizations, and works of art or entertainment.

A publicist is someone that carries out publicity, while public relations (PR) is the strategic management function that helps an organization establish and maintain communication with the public. This can be done internally, without the use of popular media. From a marketing perspective, publicity is one component of promotion and marketing. The other elements of the promotional mix are advertising, sales promotion, direct marketing and personal selling.

Organizations will sometimes organize events designed to attract media coverage, and subsequently, provide positive publicity; these events are known as publicity stunts.

== History ==
French advertising poster "Maggi arôme pour corser" by Firmin Bouisset, circa 1895.

Publicity originates from the French word publicité 'advertisement'. Publicity as a practice originates in the core of Paris, where shopping, tourism and the entertainment industry met commercialised print media and a burgeoning publishing industry. Among the urban society, scenes of consumption and new consumer identities were circulated through advertisement. La Maison Aubert shaped the emerging discipline of publicity. In early 19th century Paris, the advertisements and publicity campaigns for consumer items, such as cashmere shawls, and retailers such as perfumeries soon attracted regulation on flyposting.

19th century US companies included not only pro-sales messages in their publicity, but also explanations, demonstrations and exaggerations. Patent medicine and cosmetics manufacturers in the US frequently described or even showed consumers before and after the usage of the product. The Blair Manufacturing Company was among the US companies that advertised its products by comparing old-fashioned consumers who did not use the advertised product with the progressive customers who did. Before-after-changes became common in advertisement from 1910 onwards. In the early 20th century, American Albert Lasker, developed the used of advertising for appealing to consumers' psychology.

The contemporary economist Thorstein Veblen criticised the relative benefit of publicity. He argued that vendibility is not utility, and that publicity had "no traceable relation to any benefit which the community may derive." Veblen estimated how much the publicity campaigns of companies added to the price consumers were paying. He argued that the publicity overhead for over-the-counter pharmaceuticals and cosmetics was more than half the retail price.

== Public relations ==
Publicity is often referred to as the result of public relations, in terms of providing favourable information to media and any third party outlets; these may including bloggers, mainstream media, as well as new media forms such as podcasts. This is done to provide a message to consumers without having to pay for direct time or space. This in return creates awareness and achieves greater credibility. After the message has been distributed, the publicist in charge of the information will lose control of how the message is used and interpreted, in contrast to the way it works in advertising. According to Grunig, public relations is often reduced to publicity. He also states how publicity is a form of activity in which should be associated with the sales promotion effort of a company, in order to help aid advertising and personal salesmanship as well. Kent also stated that the doing of publicity can help attract attention whilst also supplying information regarding a specific organization or individual client and any event, activity or attribute associated with them.

A coffeehouse in 17th century London.

The use of publicity is also known to be an important strategic element and promotional tool due to its effect of intentional exposure on a consumer. This helps publicity gain an advantage over other forms of marketing, such as advertising, often in order to boost credibility. Favourable publicity is also created through reputation management, in which organizations try strive to control via the web. Furthermore, despite the fact that publicity, both good or bad, can be beneficial for an organization, company or individual, much of it is paid for despite claims that publicity is often free.

Despite publicity being an influential benefit within the marketing sector, one disadvantage which highly affects publicity is the lack of ability in which publicity cannot be repeated, in comparison to paid advertising.

== Publicists ==
A publicist is a person whose job is to generate and manage publicity for a company, product, public figure (especially a celebrity), or work such as a book, movie, or band. Though there are many aspects to a publicist's job, their main function is to persuade the news media to report about their client in the most positive way possible. Publicists identify newsworthy aspects of products and personalities to offer to media outlets as possible reportage ideas. A variant of this practice which relies on linking a brand to a breaking news story has been dubbed "newsjacking". Publicists are also responsible for shaping reportage about their clients in a timely manner that fits within a media outlet's news cycle. They attempt to present a newsworthy story in a way that influences editorial coverage in a certain, usually positive, direction. This is what is generally referred to as spin.

A press agent, or flack, is a professional publicist who acts on behalf of his or her client on all matters involving public relations. Press agents are typically employed by public personalities and organizations such as performers and businesses. A press agent will provide information to the media such as upcoming public events, interview opportunities, and promotional dates, and will work with the media in getting in touch with an appropriate client or resource. Press agents are occasionally required to act as "spin doctors, to put into the best light their clients' public actions. While press agents have traditionally worked with newspapers and television, they may also be conversant with newer media forms such as blogs and podcasts.

== Negativity ==
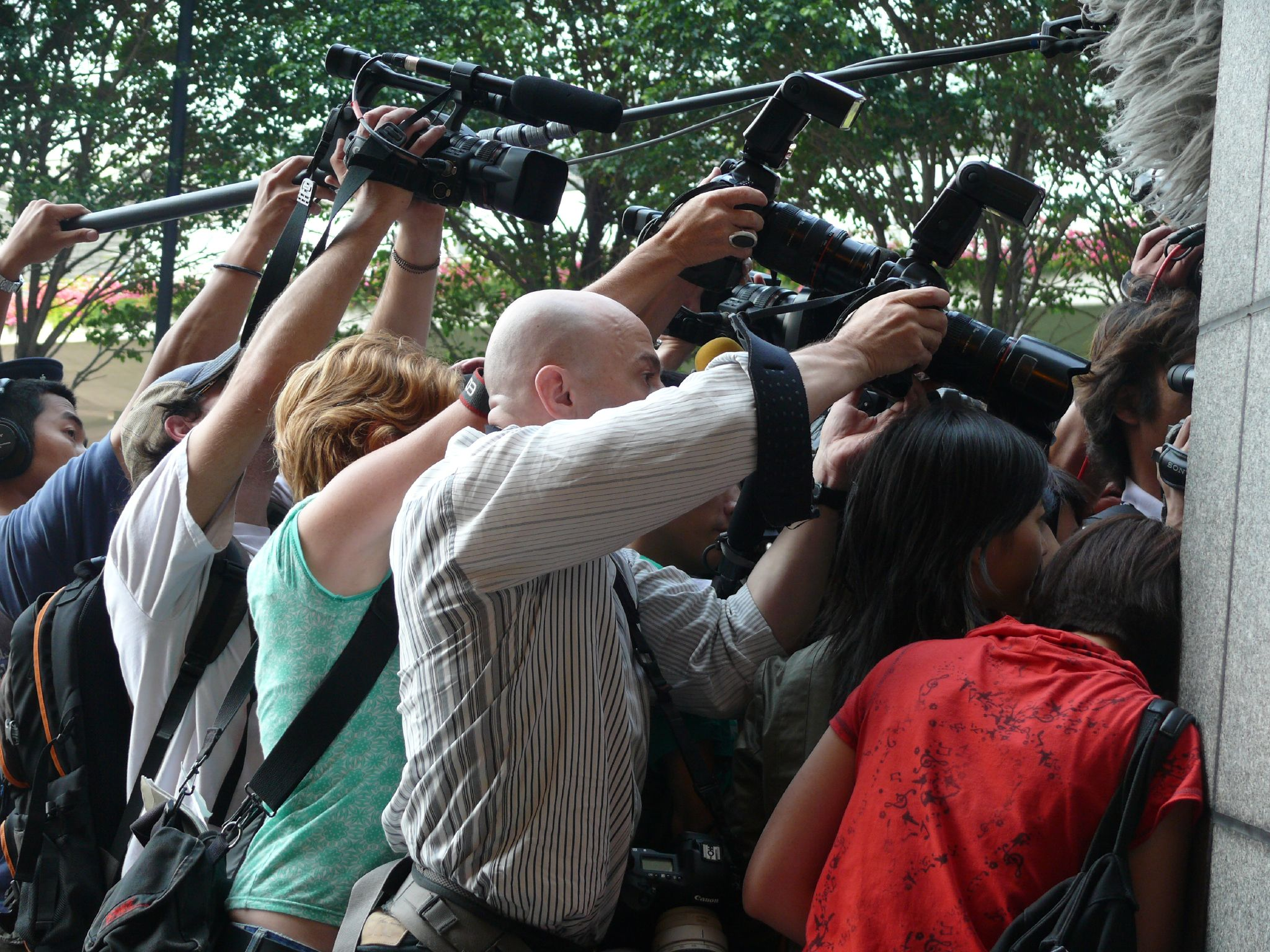
Press photographers in Hong Kong.

Publicity can also create a negative effect for those being publicized. One of the most important factors in relation to influencing a consumer's buying decision is how a company, brand, or individual deals with negative publicity. Negative publicity may result in major loss of revenue or market shares within a business. It can also play a part in damaging a consumer's perception of a brand or its products. Negative publicity's high credibility and greater influence compared to other company-controlled communications play a part in the potential damage it may have on a corporate image. Crises involved with an organization may also result in negative publicity.

Furthermore, negative publicity affects everything from the evaluation of a brand and product to the present. Often, when awareness of a company, brand, or individual is high, negative publicity is deemed to hurt possible sales. In contrast, companies, brands, and individuals who are not widely known may use the negative publicity in order to increase brand awareness among the public.

The extensive range of media outlets, including both traditional and new media, provide opportunities for companies to market their products or services. This restricts or reduces the ability to manage negative publicity, as their message may be spread across media outlets. In order for organizations to try salvage any negative publicity surrounding their brand, corporate social responsibility (CSR) is one solution which can help protect the image of a company or help reverse the damage. Companies must adopt the CSR approach early for it to be effective, or potential risks such as falsified intentions may develop within a consumer's perception.

Despite the damaging effect negative publicity may cause, negative publicity may not always have the expected effect. There is a possibility that negative publicity may in fact gain more attention as opposed to positive publicity. Regardless of the nature of negative publicity and its ability to turn most people away, any slight hint of negative publicity can in fact build interest amongst the consumer. As stated by Monga and John, negative publicity is not always harmful, and consumers whom identify a brand with strong attitudes are highly unlikely to be affected by the negative publicity formed.

== See also ==
- Earned media
- Photo op
- Publicity stunt
- Succès de scandale
- Viral marketing
