= Warren station (Pennsylvania Railroad) =

Warren
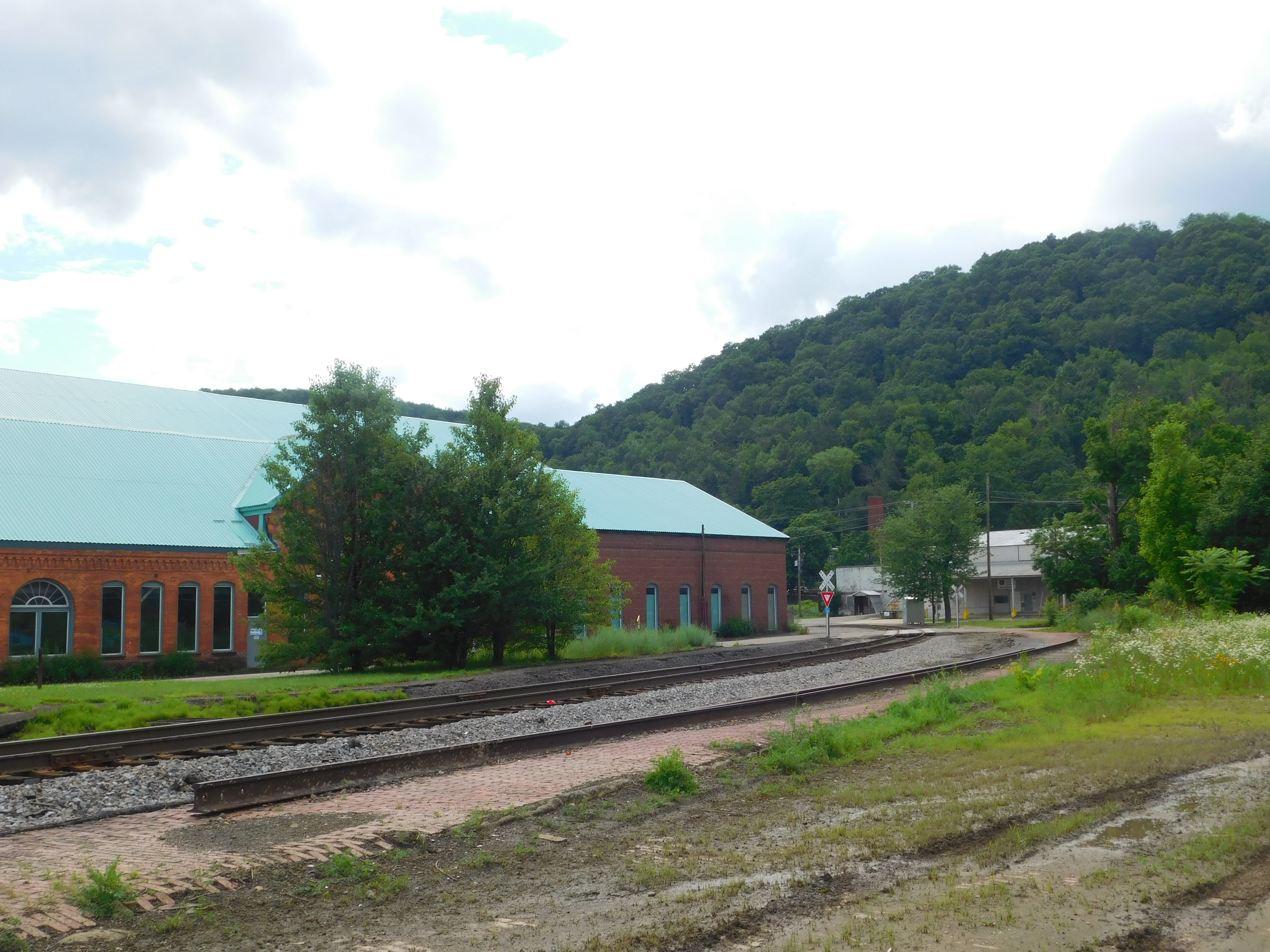
- Warren's station site in June 2018.

General information
- Location: 316 Chestnut Street, Warren, Pennsylvania

History
- Opened: 1868

Former services
Preceding station	Pennsylvania Railroad	Following station
Irvineton toward Erie	Erie – Harrisburg	Clarendon toward Harrisburg
Irvineton toward Oil City	Oil City – Olean	Struthers toward Olean
- Pennsylvania Railroad Passenger Station
- Formerly listed on the U.S. National Register of Historic Places
- Location within Pennsylvania Location within the United States
- Location: 316 Chestnut St., Warren, Pennsylvania
- Area: 1 acre (0.40 ha)
- Built: 1868
- NRHP reference No.: 74001804

Significant dates
- Added to NRHP: November 19, 1974
- Removed from NRHP: May 8, 1986
Location

Warren was a historic railway station located at Warren, Warren County, Pennsylvania.

The last Pennsylvania Railroad passenger train (northbound Train 581, southbound Train 580) ran March 27, 1965.

It was listed on the National Register of Historic Places in 1974 as Pennsylvania Railroad Passenger Station. It was delisted in 1986, after being demolished.
