= Blair Corporation =

American mail order company

- Company type: Private
- Industry: Mail order, retail
- Founded: 1910
- Headquarters: Warren, Pennsylvania, USA
- Key people: Adelmo S. Lopez, CEO and President
- Products: Men's and Women's Clothing, Household goods
- Revenue: US$ 262.8 million
- Number of employees: 1,200
- Parent: Bluestem Brands, Inc.
- Website: www.blair.com

Blair Corporation was one of America's largest direct marketing mail order retailers, selling clothing and household goods. Founded in 1910 as the New Process Company by John Leo Blair, the company celebrated its 100th year in business in 2010. The company is well known for its retail catalogs, which are sent to millions of customers in the United States. While most business is done through mail-order, phone, or online, Blair also maintains retail stores in Warren and Grove City, Pennsylvania, where it is based. Blair employs around 1200 associates.

== Company history ==
Blair was founded in 1910 by John L. Blair, who originally took up an offer to sell raincoats. After several unsuccessful attempts at selling the coats, he was asked by an undertaker if he had any attractive black raincoats. He didn't, but it gave him an idea. The idea John had was to take advantage of the relatively new process of rubber vulcanization to adhere an attractive black wool fabric to the outside of a rubber raincoat, with an inner lining of a Scottish plaid. His classmate agreed to begin producing just such a coat and supplied him initially with 1200 coats, which were purchased almost immediately. He actually had to send out letters of apology until new coats could be produced. Samples of his letters from as early as 1910 still exist.

With the help of his father and siblings, John mailed 10,000 letters to undertakers across America and the coat quickly saturated the market. He expanded with letters to ministers and businessmen, and he also expanded his product line. For the first few years his business was known as New Process Rubber Company, and by 1916 it was changed to New Process Company.

New Process Company went public in 1924. By the mid-1980s, New Process was also said to be the largest publicly held direct-marketer of clothing and home products in the United States, and also had the oldest continually traded stock on the American Stock Exchange. Murray McComas, CEO at that time, appeared in a filmed interview on the floor of the America Stock Exchange to discuss the unique position New Process Company found itself in. In 1989, the name of the company was changed to Blair.

The company continued to grow. According to the Pittsburgh Press, in 1989, Blair had capabilities to process 100,000 orders per day, and was shipping as many as 75,000 packages a day. It had sales in 1988 of US$414 million, US$506.8 million in 1998, and US$420 million in 2007. Blair had 15 million Americans on its mailing list.

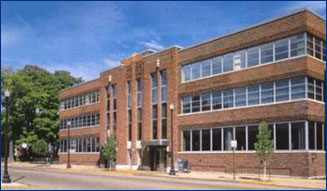
Blair Corporate Headquarters in downtown Warren, PA

== Continued growth ==
In the mid-2000s, Blair began to struggle with declining sales, due to the recession in the economy. In 2007, Blair shareholders approved a merger deal with Appleseed's (later renamed Orchard Brands), a subsidiary of Golden Gate Capital Partners. Orchard Brands is a holding of several different catalog retailers who target the same market. Under the leadership of Orchard Brands, Blair has seen re-organization and increased efficiency, as well as growth as Blair facilities are being expanded to handle orders from other Orchard Brand companies. Blair's modern distribution center is being used to ship not only Blair orders, but orders for some sister companies as well. The call center operations have been expanded as well, to handle orders from those companies. After the merger, it was announced that 500 new jobs would be created in the region, due to the expansion at the Blair facilities. In 2007, Blair was ranked the 118th largest internet retailer by InternetRetailer.com. In 2010, Blair president and CEO Shelley Nandkeolyar announced his resignation, and he was followed by Dave Matthews, who served as interim CEO. It was also announced that Blair, as part of Orchard brands, was the 59th largest internet retailer. In April 2010, Dave Walde was announced as the new Blair CEO. Previously, Walde had served as the chief financial officer for Orchard Brands. In 2011, Orchard Brands went through a bankruptcy; it exited under the control of debtholders, including American Capital. Orchard Brands had sales of US$ 1.02 billion in 2014.

On May 27, 2015, Orchard Brands announced it was being acquired by Capmark Financial to be another business within the Bluestem Brands retail business. Bluestem also owns Fingerhut.

In February 2018, Chris Wilson was named President of Orchard Brands with responsibility for the 11 brands that make up the portfolio.

On March 9, 2020, the company's parent Bluestem Brands, Inc. filed for Chapter 11 bankruptcy in the United States District Court for the District of Delaware.

As of August 19, 2025, Blair no longer accepts new orders.
