= A.J. Hazeltine House =

Historic house in Pennsylvania, United States

- A. J. Hazeltine House
- U.S. National Register of Historic Places
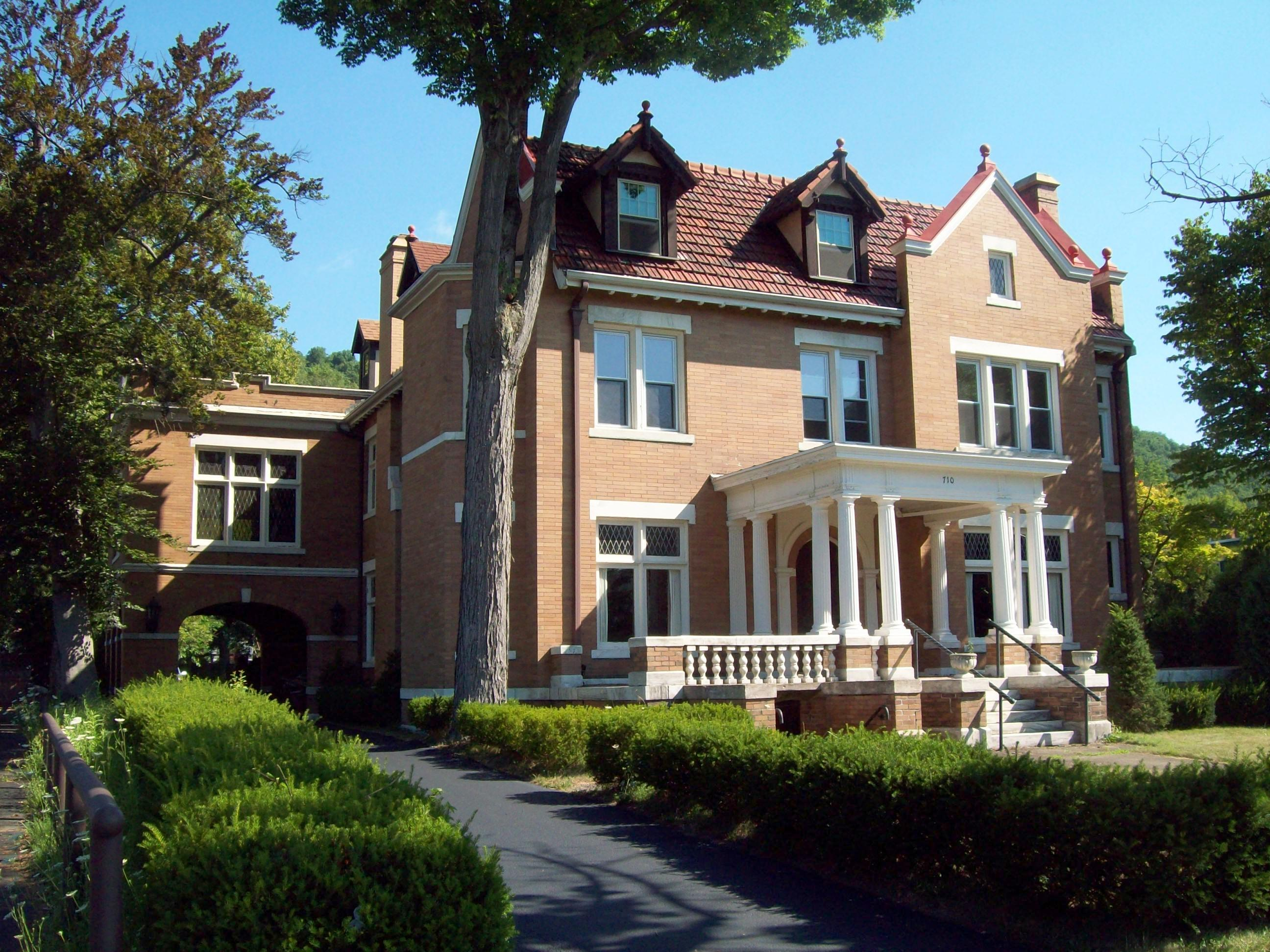
- A.J. Hazeltine House, July 2012

- Location within Pennsylvania Location within the United States
- Location: 710 Pennsylvania Ave., W., Warren, Pennsylvania
- Coordinates: 41°50′43″N 79°9′24″W
- Area: 1.2 acres (0.49 ha)
- Built: 1905–1907
- Architect: Edward A. Phillips
- Architectural style: English Jacobean
- NRHP reference No.: 76001677
- Added to NRHP: November 21, 1976

A. J. Hazeltine House, also known as the Honorable Charles Warren Stone Museum, is a historic home located at Warren, Warren County, Pennsylvania. It was built in 1905–1907, and is a three-story, buff brick dwelling in the Jacobean style. It features marble lintels and capstones and wide terraces on two sides of the house. Its builder, A. J. Hazeltine, was a business associate of Congressman Charles Warren Stone (1843-1912). The American Legion occupied the house starting in 1928. It was acquired by the county for the Warren County Historical Society in 1975.

It was added to the National Register of Historic Places in 1976.
