= Warren Armory =

- U.S. National Register of Historic Places
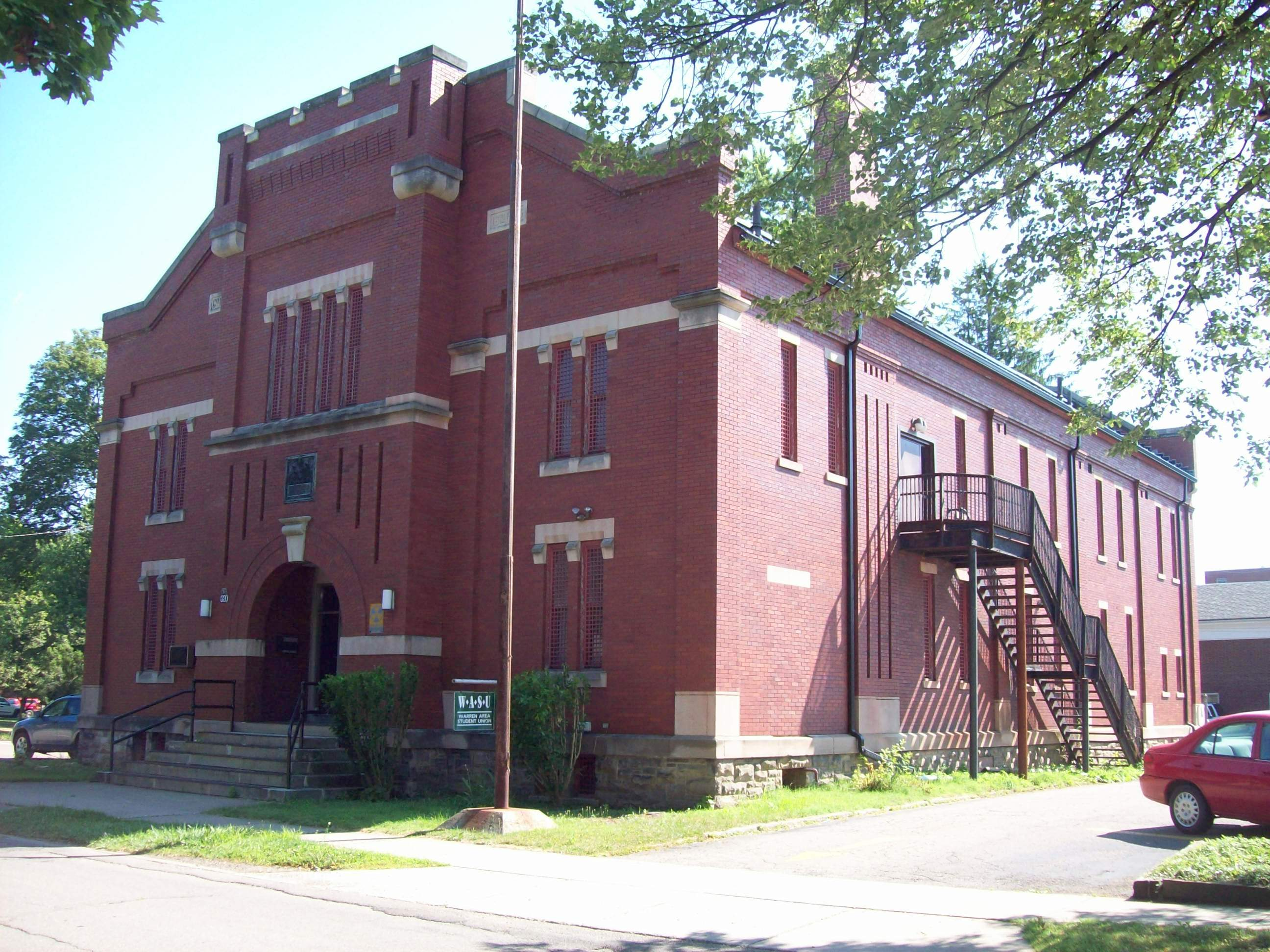
- Warren Armory, July 2012

- Location within Pennsylvania Location within the United States
- Location: 330 Hickory St., Warren, Pennsylvania
- Coordinates: 41°50′49″N 79°8′52″W
- Area: 0.2 acres (0.081 ha)
- Built: 1909
- Architect: Mount, A.P.
- Architectural style: Romanesque
- MPS: Pennsylvania National Guard Armories MPS
- NRHP reference No.: 91000519
- Added to NRHP: May 9, 1991

Warren Armory is a historic National Guard armory located at Warren, Warren County, Pennsylvania. It was built in 1909, and is a 2 1/2-story, brick building with a gambrel roof in the Romanesque style. The drill hall is located on the second floor. It has a projecting central entrance bay, stone sills and lintels, brick turrets, and a crenelated parapet.

It was added to the National Register of Historic Places in 1991.
