= Woman's Club of Warren =

- U.S. National Register of Historic Places
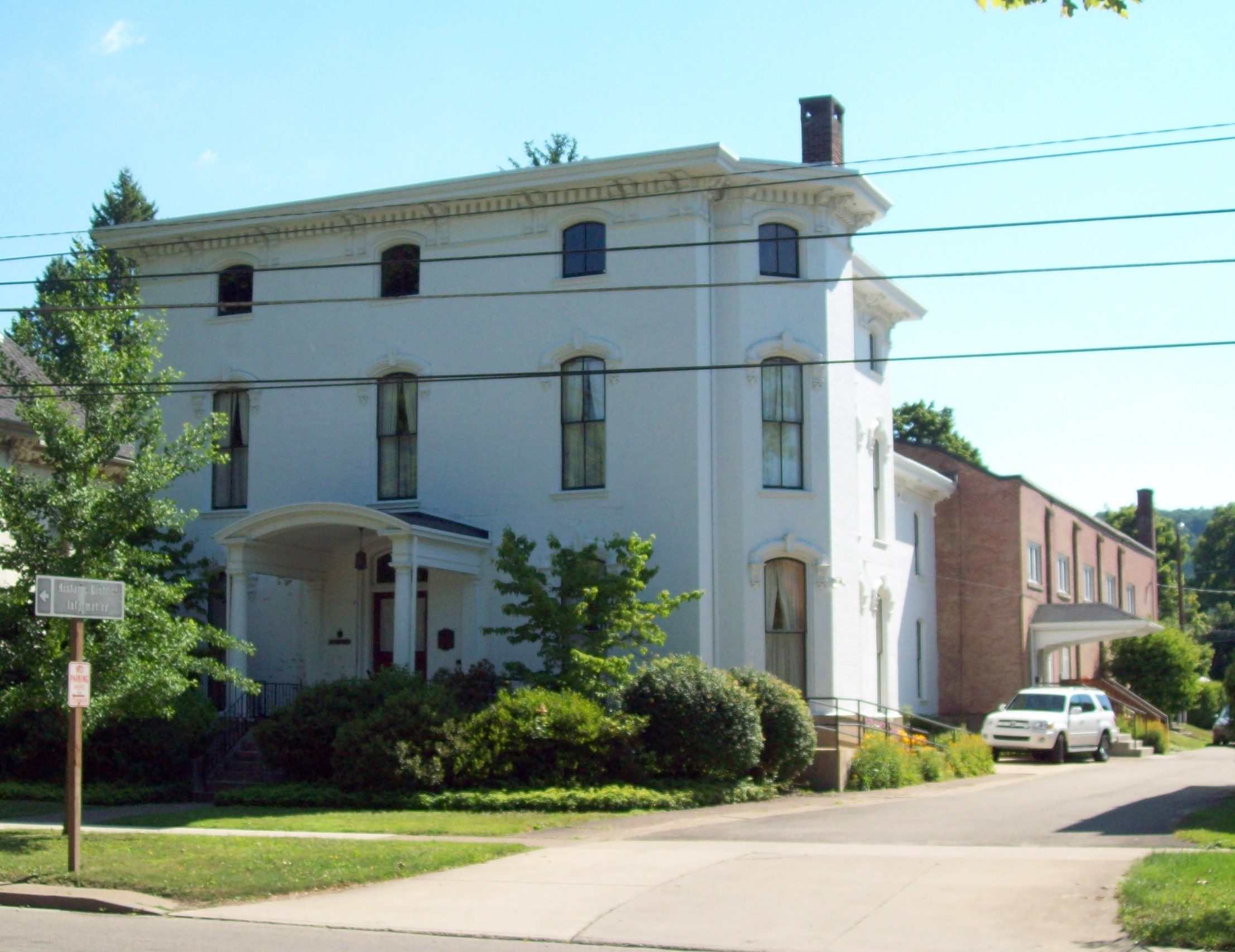
- Woman's Club of Warren, July 2012

- Location within Pennsylvania Location within the United States
- Location: 310 Market St., Warren, Pennsylvania
- Coordinates: 41°50′52″N 79°8′46″W
- Area: less than one acre
- Built: 1872
- Architect: Schuler, Frank
- Architectural style: Italianate
- NRHP reference No.: 96000715
- Added to NRHP: June 28, 1996

The Woman's Club of Warren, also known as the Myron Waters House, is an historic home that is located in Warren, Warren County, Pennsylvania, United States.

It was added to the National Register of Historic Places in 1996.

== History and architectural features ==
Built in 1872, this historic structure is a three-story, brick building with a two-story addition that was designed in the Italianate style. It has a shallow pitched hipped roof, entry porch with segmented arched roof, and three-story bay window.

Originally created as a private residence, it was acquired by the Woman's Club of Warren in 1922. A five hundred-seat auditorium was added in 1924 to the rear of the dwelling.
