= Struthers Library Building =

Library and theatre in Warren, Pennsylvania

- U.S. National Register of Historic Places
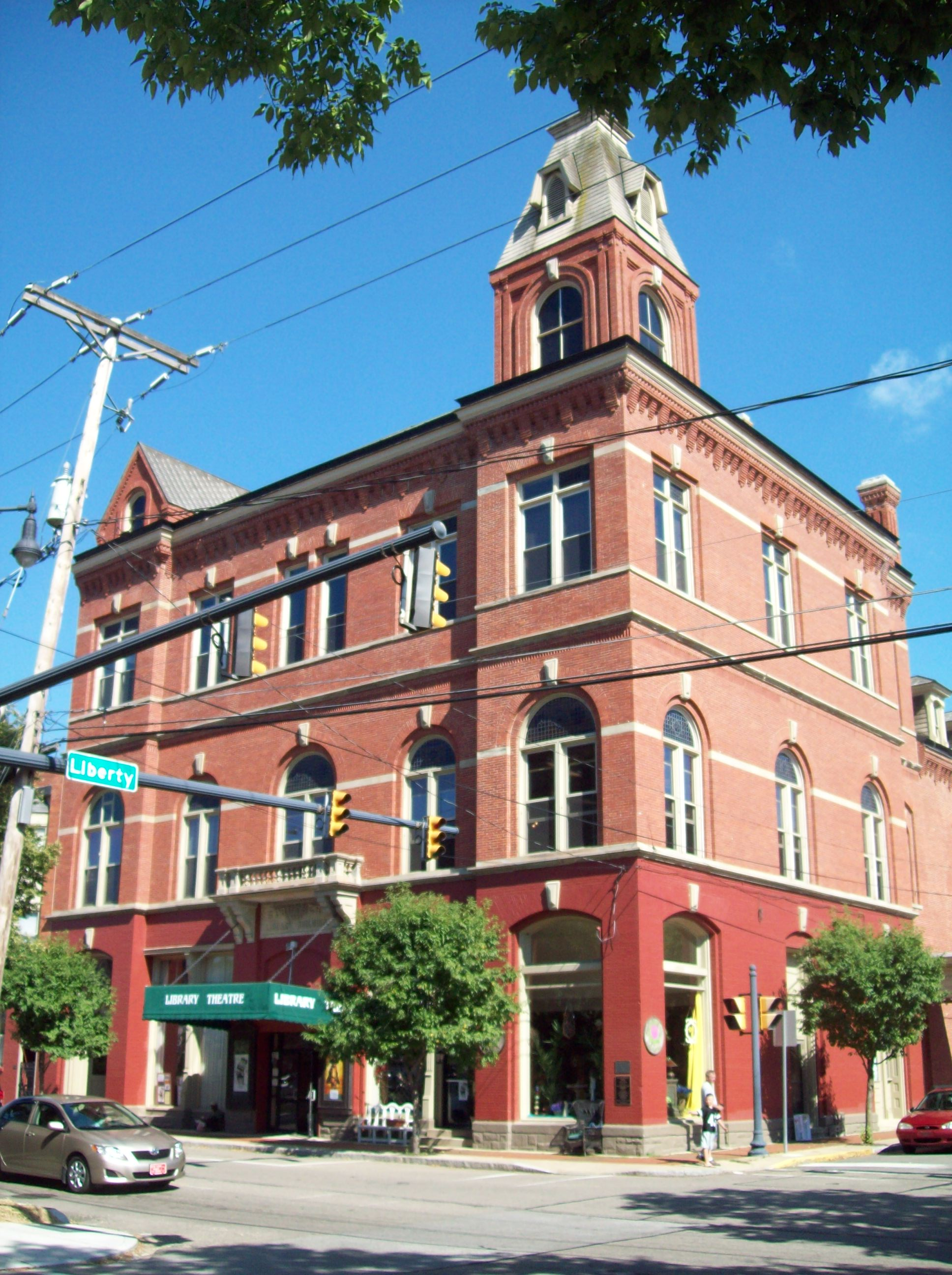
- Struthers Library Building, July 2012

- Location within Pennsylvania Location within the United States
- Location: 3rd Ave. and Liberty St., Warren, Pennsylvania
- Coordinates: 41°50′48″N 79°8′55″W
- Area: 1 acre (0.40 ha)
- Built: 1883
- Architect: Warren and Wetmore
- NRHP reference No.: 75001671
- Added to NRHP: October 10, 1975

The Struthers Library Building, also known as the Library Theatre, is a historic library and theatre building in Warren, Pennsylvania, U.S.

It was added to the National Register of Historic Places in 1975.

== History and architectural features ==
Built in 1883, this historic structure is a red brick building that consists of three sections and measures seventy-three feet wide by 162 feet deep. The front section is three stories high with a corner tower. The second floor housed a library and the third a meeting hall, which was originally used as the town's Masonic Temple. It has a marquee on the front elevation. Behind the front section is the auditorium and behind that is a three-story section with dressing rooms and stage.

The auditorium was originally built as a Victorian opera house. The building was renovated in 1919 by the architectural firm of Warren and Wetmore.

During the 1919 renovation, the auditorium was modified to make it suitable for movies and traveling vaudeville shows. This building was added to the National Register of Historic Places in 1975.

In 1983, the auditorium underwent an extensive restoration, preserving the details of the 1919 renovation.
