= Warren County Courthouse (Pennsylvania) =

- U.S. National Register of Historic Places
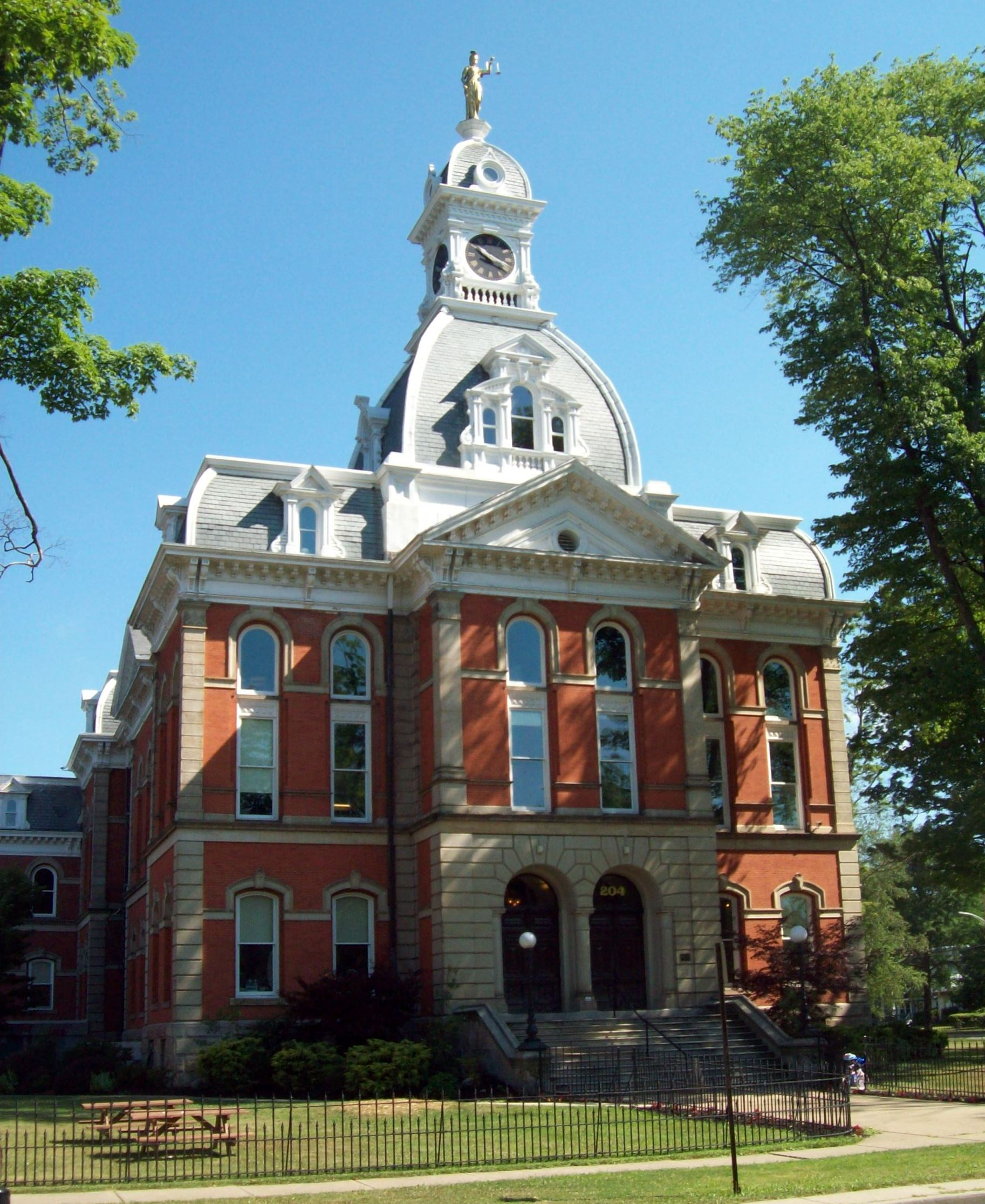
- Warren County Courthouse, July 2012

- Location within Pennsylvania Location within the United States
- Interactive map showing the location of Warren County Courthouse
- Location: Market St. and 4th Ave., Warren, Pennsylvania
- Coordinates: 41°50′55″N 79°8′50″W
- Area: 1.8 acres (0.73 ha)
- Built: 1876-1877
- Architect: M.E. Beebe
- Architectural style: Second Empire
- NRHP reference No.: 77001198
- Added to NRHP: April 18, 1977

Warren County Courthouse is a historic county courthouse located at Warren, Warren County, Pennsylvania. It was built in 1876–1877, and is a 2 1/2-story, brick and sandstone building in the Second Empire style. It has a slate covered mansard roof. It measures 72 feet by 122 feet, and has a large 4-sided dome topped by a square clock tower and statue of justice.

It was designed by architect Milton Earl Beebe.

It was added to the National Register of Historic Places in 1976.

== See also ==
- List of state and county courthouses in Pennsylvania
