= Guy C. Irvine House =

Historic house in Pennsylvania, United States

- U.S. National Register of Historic Places
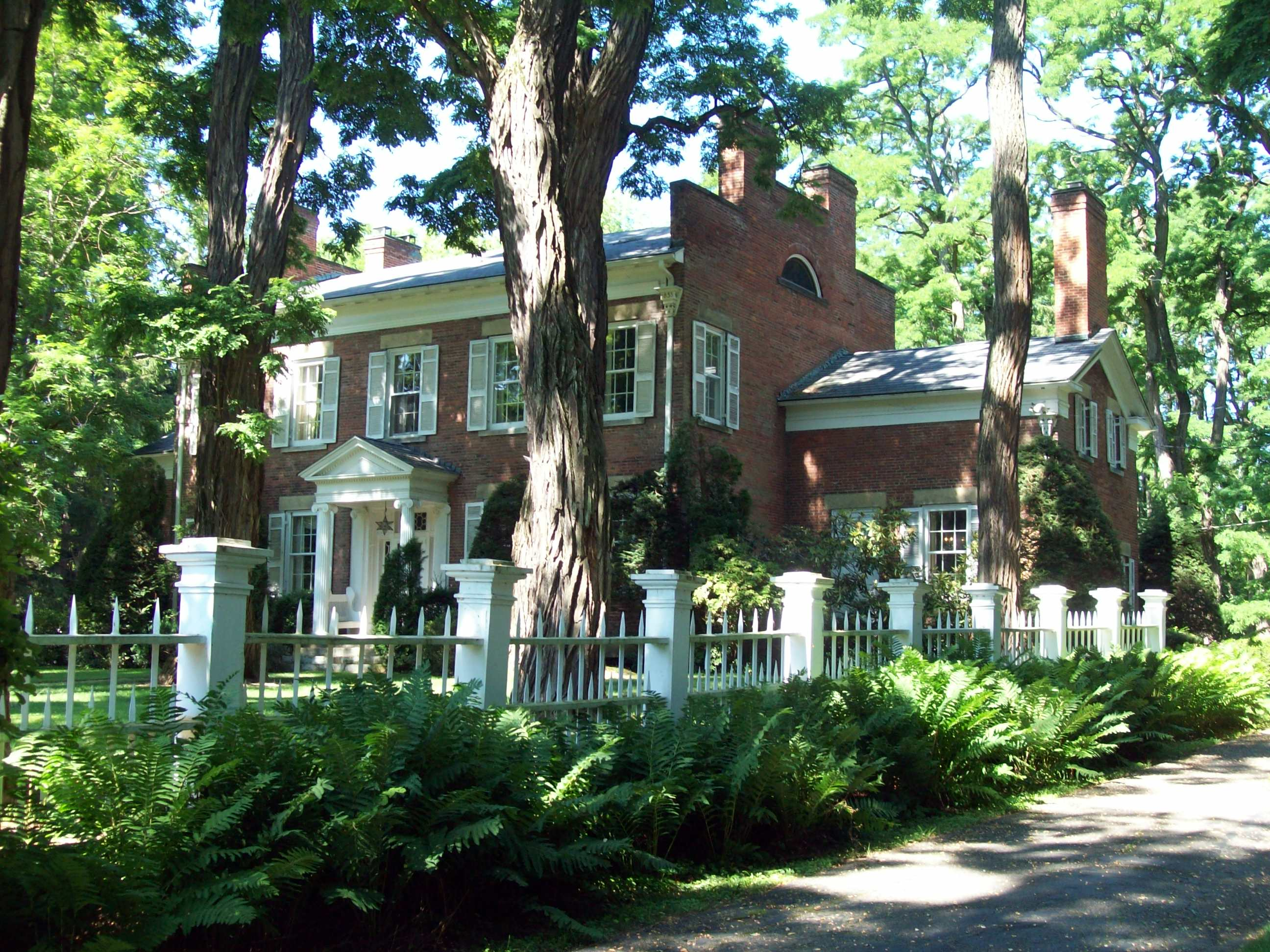
- Guy C. Irvine House, July 2012

- Location within Pennsylvania Location within the United States
- Location: 1.5 miles (2.4 km) south of Russell on U.S. Route 62, Pine Grove Township, Pennsylvania
- Coordinates: 41°55′12″N 79°09′04″W
- Area: 13 acres (5.3 ha)
- Built: 1831-1835
- Built by: Irvine, Guy C.; Weatherby, Rufus
- NRHP reference No.: 78002479
- Added to NRHP: September 13, 1978

The Guy C. Irvine House, also known as "The Locusts," The Walker House, and The Kopf House, is an historic home which is located outside of Pine Grove Township, Warren County, Russell, Pennsylvania.

== History and architectural features ==
The house design is Greek Revival in the front (East face), and post-colonial/Pennsylvania Georgian in the back. This historic structure was built between 1831 and 1835, and is a two-story, brick dwelling, with two-story flanking wings. Five bays wide and two bays deep, with a gable roof, it features a pedimented porch supported by two columns.

The foundation construction is a twenty-one-inch hand cut stone that was obtained from a local quarry. The external and internal house walls are double brick. A unique feature is the "bridged" end chimneys. There were originally fourteen fireplaces; eleven remain.

There have been several fires, presumably isolated to the southern flanking wing. These were probably kitchen fires, possibly occurring around 1875 (3), 1890 and 1910.

The grounds of the Irvine House still have many of the original Black Locust trees (Robinia pseudoacacia), which were either planted by Irvine, or were possibly existing as a locust grove prior to construction of the home. The wooden fence enclosing the front yard was rebuilt to original design in the early 1940s. The house and grounds are well documented in Charles Stotz book "The Early Architecture of Western Pennsylvania". Stotz noted that "The Locust" is one of only a few historic homes (pre-1860) in Western Pennsylvania that still retain some of its original landscaping.

The house was designed by William Bell and built by William and John Thompson for business partners and friends, Guy Carrolton Irvine and Rufus Weatherby. Guy and Rufus married sisters and traveled together extensively, so they initially designed the house to accommodate two families. However, during the construction, Rufus Weatherby died (1833) and the house was finished for a single family. The Irvine House was part of the Irvine family until 1940, when it was purchased by the Walkers. The Walkers meticulously restored the house and grounds, retaining the original trees, rebuilding the fence and adding utilities for the first time. When the Walkers purchased the property there were several outbuildings; however all but the original outhouse was in poor condition and demolished. The original, two-stall brick outhouse was restored, and two brick outbuildings were added.

The Locusts was added to the National Register of Historic Places on 13 September 1978. It is the only house in Pine Grove township listed on the National Register.
