= John P. Jefferson House =

Historic house in Pennsylvania, United States

- U.S. National Register of Historic Places
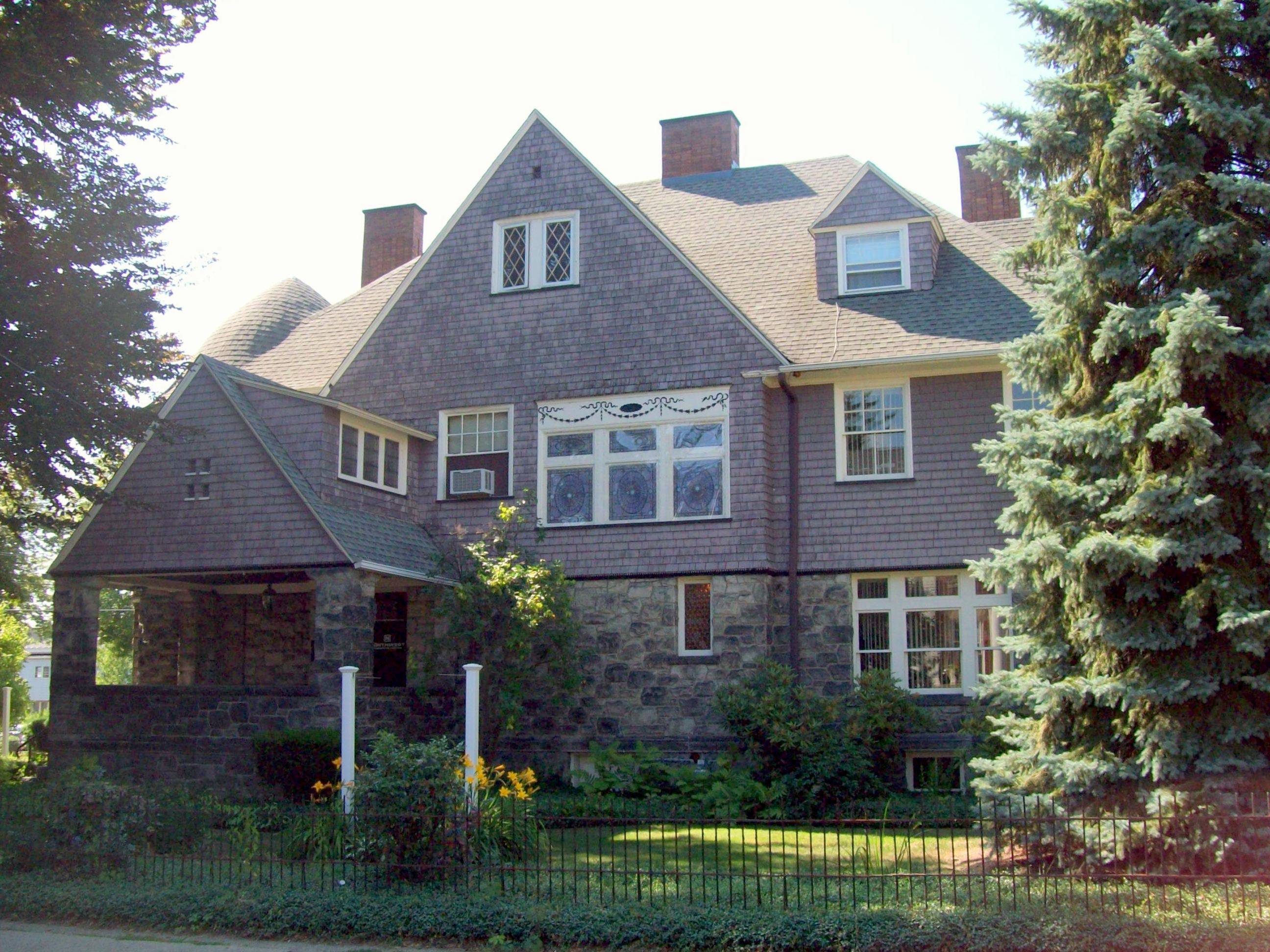
- John P. Jefferson House, July 2012

- Location within Pennsylvania Location within the United States
- Location: 119 Market St., Warren, Pennsylvania
- Coordinates: 41°50′41″N 79°8′45″W
- Area: 0.3 acres (0.12 ha)
- Built: 1890
- Architect: Uhdey, Christian
- NRHP reference No.: 85000996
- Added to NRHP: May 9, 1985

The John P. Jefferson House, also known as the Jefferson Tea House and YWCA Residence, is an historic home that is located in Warren, Warren County, Pennsylvania, United States.

It was added to the National Register of Historic Places in 1985.

== History and architectural features ==
Built in 1890, this historic structure is a three-story, stone and shingled dwelling that was designed in a Richardsonian Romanesque style. It features a steep hipped roof, four tall chimney stacks, a semi-circular turret, porch supported by massive stone columns, and bay windows. The Jefferson House is currently occupied by the administrative offices of the Northern Pennsylvania Regional College.
