= Wetmore House (Warren, Pennsylvania) =

Historic house in Pennsylvania, United States

- U.S. National Register of Historic Places
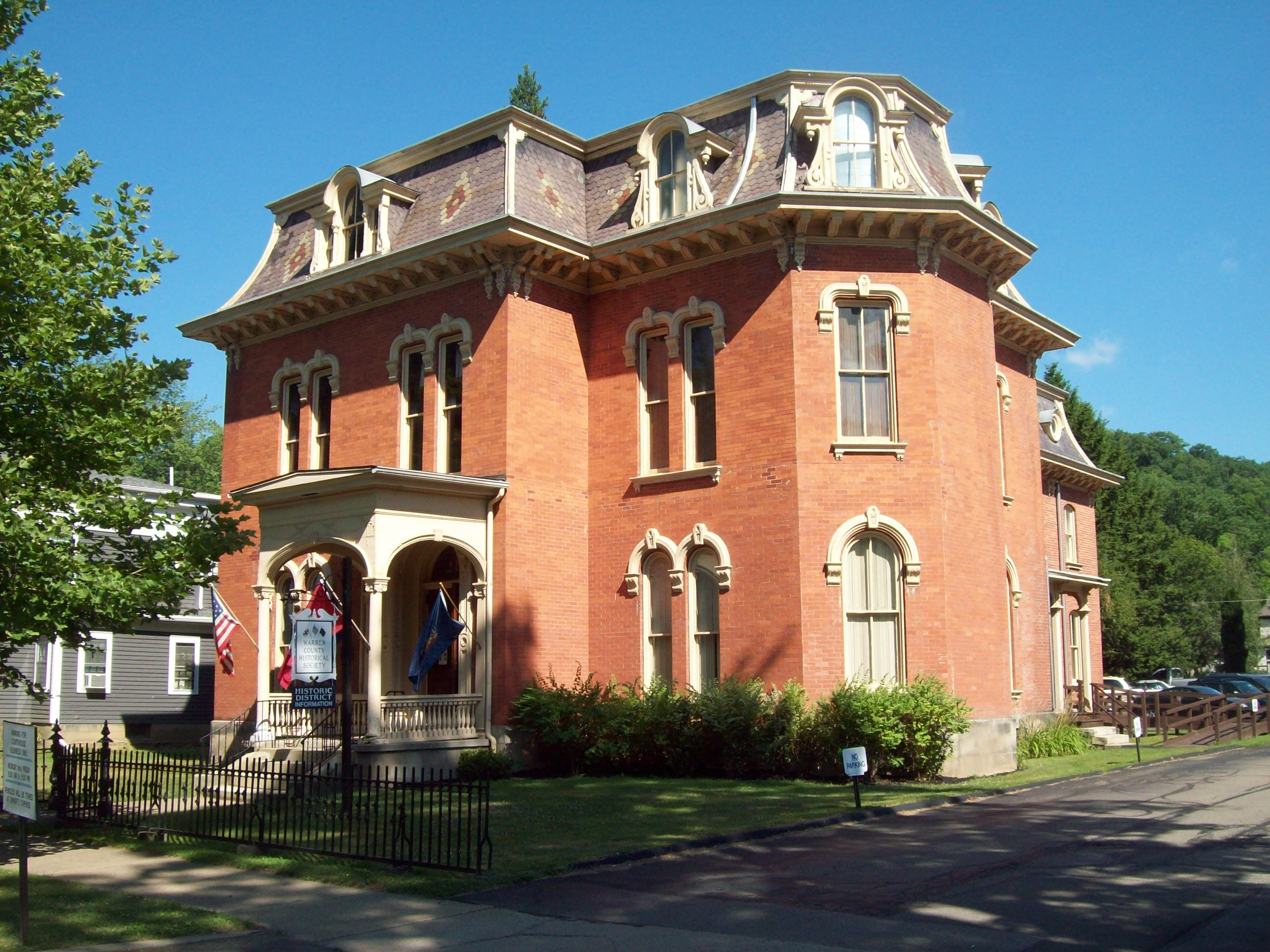
- Wetmore House, July 2012

- Location within Pennsylvania Location within the United States
- Location: 210 4th Ave., Warren, Pennsylvania
- Coordinates: 41°50′54″N 79°8′52″W
- Area: 0.3 acres (0.12 ha)
- Built: 1870–1873
- Architectural style: Second Empire
- NRHP reference No.: 75001672
- Added to NRHP: April 28, 1975

Wetmore House, also known as the Warren County Historical Society, is a historic home located at Warren, Warren County, Pennsylvania. It was built between 1870 and 1873, and is a two-story, red brick mansion in the Second Empire style. It has a mansard roof and small, one-story open portico. It was acquired by the Warren County Historical Society in 1964.

It was added to the National Register of Historic Places in 1975.
