= Warren, Pennsylvania =

City in Pennsylvania, US

Warren, Pennsylvania Seneca: Ga:nöwögö:h
- City
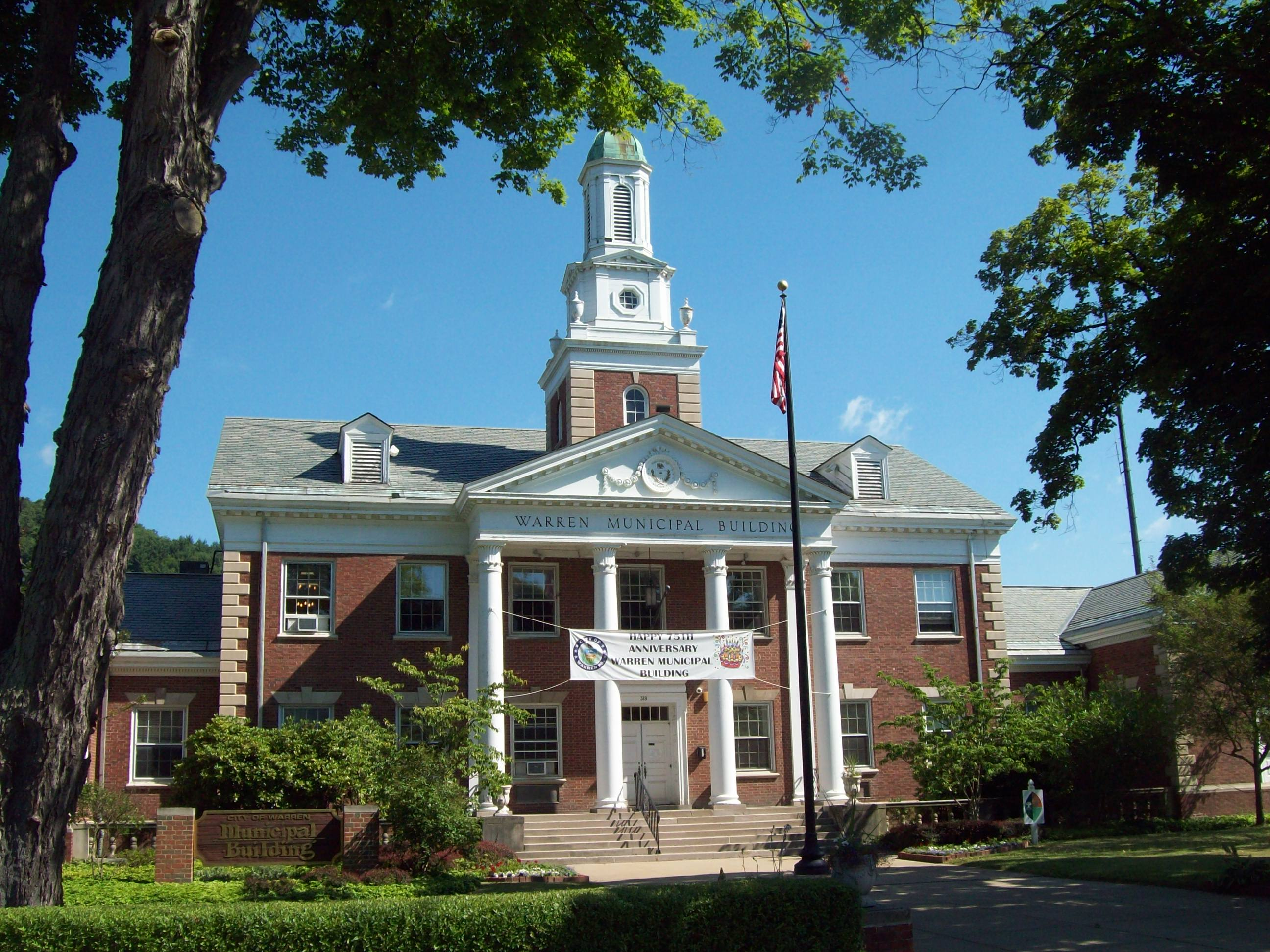
- Warren Municipal Building in Warren in July 2012

- Flag Seal Logo
- Etymology: General Joseph Warren
- Motto: "On the Banks of the Allegheny"
- Location of Warren in Warren County, Pennsylvania (left) and of Warren County in Pennsylvania (right)

- Location of Warren in Pennsylvania
- Coordinates: 41°50′39″N 79°8′33″W
- Country: United States
- State: Pennsylvania
- County: Warren
- Founded: 1795

Government
  - Mayor: David G. Wortman

Area
  - Total: 3.09 sq mi (8.00 km^{2})
  - Land: 2.91 sq mi (7.54 km^{2})
  - Water: 0.18 sq mi (0.46 km^{2})
- Elevation: 1,210 ft (370 m)

Population (2020)
  - Total: 9,404
  - Estimate (2023): 9,125
  - Density: 3,230/sq mi (1,250/km^{2})
- Time zone: UTC-5 (EST)
  - Summer (DST): UTC-4 (EDT)
- ZIP Code: 16365
- Area code: 814
- FIPS code: 42-81000
- Website: https://www.cityofwarrenpa.gov/

Warren (Seneca: Ga:nöwögö:h) is a city in and the county seat of Warren County, Pennsylvania, United States, located along the Allegheny River. The population was 9,404 at the 2020 census. It is home to the headquarters of the Allegheny National Forest and the Cornplanter State Forest. It is also the headquarters for the Chief Cornplanter Council, the oldest continuously chartered Boy Scouts of America Council, and the catalog company Blair. Warren is the principal city of the Warren micropolitan area.

== History ==
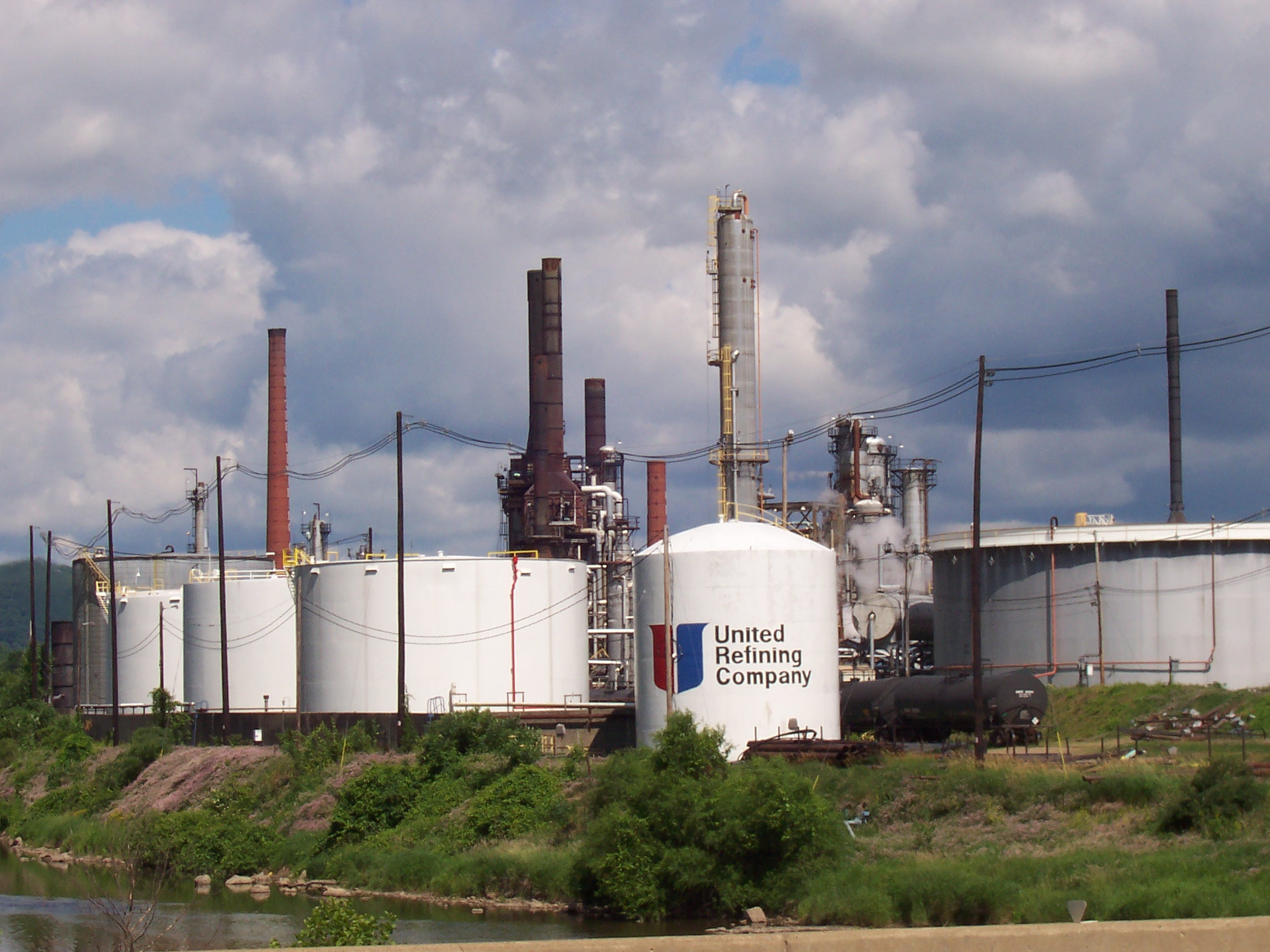
United Refining in Warren

Warren was initially inhabited by Native Americans of the Seneca nation. French explorers had longstanding claims to the area which they acted to secure in an unambiguous fashion with a military-Amerindian expedition in 1749 that buried a succession of plaques claiming the territory as France's in response to the formation of the colonial Ohio Company—and the first of these was buried in Warren but ultimately control was transferred to the British after the French and Indian War.

After the Revolutionary War, General William Irvine and Andrew Ellicott were sent to the area to lay out a town in 1795. It was named after Major General Joseph Warren.

The first permanent structure in Warren, a storehouse built by the Holland Land Company, was completed in 1796. Daniel McQuay of Ireland was the first permanent inhabitant of European descent.

Lumber was the main industry from 1810–1840, as the abundance of wood and access to water made it profitable to float lumber down the Allegheny River to Pittsburgh.

David Beaty discovered oil in Warren in 1875 while drilling for natural gas in his wife's flower garden. Oil came to dominate the city's economy. Many of the town's large Victorian homes were built with revenue generated by the local oil and timber industries.

Pittsburgh-Des Moines, which was formerly located in Warren, manufactured the Gateway Arch in St. Louis. Pittsburgh-Des Moines (PDM) also made railroad car tanks, storage tanks and other plate work. Several miniature replicas are located within the county, including one at the new visitors center on Routes US 6 and US 62 next to the Pennsylvania State Police barracks.

Warren has struggled through hard economic times and a steady decline in population, which peaked at nearly 15,000 in 1940. The city is attempting to bounce back with the Impact Warren project, a riverfront development project in downtown Warren. The completed project will include new townhouses and senior citizen housing, retail and commercial development, a parking garage, convention center and bus depot.

Major employers include Walmart, the United Refining Company (gas supplier for Kwik Fill and Red Apple Food Mart gas stations), Allegheny National Forest, Northwest Bank, Whirley-Drinkworks, Superior Tire and Rubber Corp, Pennsylvania General Energy, Blair Corporation, Sheetz, and Interlectric.

The Warren Historic District, A.J. Hazeltine House, John P. Jefferson House, Struthers Library Building, Warren Armory, Warren County Courthouse, Wetmore House, Guy Irvine House. and Woman's Club of Warren are listed on the National Register of Historic Places.

== Geography ==
Warren is located at the confluence of the Allegheny River and the Conewango Creek. Conewango Creek flows between New York state and Warren. Allegheny Reservoir and Kinzua Dam are nearby.

According to the U.S. Census Bureau, Warren has a total area of 3.1 square miles (8.0 km^{2}), 2.9 square miles (7.5 km^{2}) of which is land and 0.2 square miles (0.52 km^{2}) (6.11%) of which is water.

The Allegheny River from the Kinzua Dam to the City of Warren has been designated a "Recreational Waterway" by the United States Congress.

=== Climate ===
Climate data for Warren, Pennsylvania (1991–2020 normals, extremes 1896–present)
Month	Jan	Feb	Mar	Apr	May	Jun	Jul	Aug	Sep	Oct	Nov	Dec	Year
Record high °F (°C)	74 (23)	74 (23)	83 (28)	92 (33)	95 (35)	98 (37)	102 (39)	100 (38)	100 (38)	90 (32)	84 (29)	74 (23)	102 (39)
Mean daily maximum °F (°C)	32.6 (0.3)	35.2 (1.8)	44.3 (6.8)	58.3 (14.6)	69.8 (21.0)	77.4 (25.2)	81.3 (27.4)	80.4 (26.9)	74.0 (23.3)	60.8 (16.0)	47.9 (8.8)	37.2 (2.9)	58.3 (14.6)
Daily mean °F (°C)	25.2 (−3.8)	26.5 (−3.1)	34.2 (1.2)	46.4 (8.0)	57.5 (14.2)	66.0 (18.9)	70.0 (21.1)	69.0 (20.6)	62.7 (17.1)	50.9 (10.5)	39.9 (4.4)	30.7 (−0.7)	48.2 (9.0)
Mean daily minimum °F (°C)	17.8 (−7.9)	17.7 (−7.9)	24.2 (−4.3)	34.4 (1.3)	45.2 (7.3)	54.5 (12.5)	58.7 (14.8)	57.7 (14.3)	51.5 (10.8)	40.9 (4.9)	32.0 (0.0)	24.3 (−4.3)	38.2 (3.4)
Record low °F (°C)	−26 (−32)	−34 (−37)	−24 (−31)	0 (−18)	20 (−7)	29 (−2)	36 (2)	35 (2)	26 (−3)	14 (−10)	1 (−17)	−22 (−30)	−34 (−37)
Average precipitation inches (mm)	3.64 (92)	2.77 (70)	3.26 (83)	4.13 (105)	4.29 (109)	4.66 (118)	4.76 (121)	4.07 (103)	3.95 (100)	4.02 (102)	3.62 (92)	3.81 (97)	46.98 (1,193)
Average snowfall inches (cm)	18.2 (46)	14.9 (38)	10.0 (25)	2.4 (6.1)	0.0 (0.0)	0.0 (0.0)	0.0 (0.0)	0.0 (0.0)	0.0 (0.0)	0.1 (0.25)	7.5 (19)	18.5 (47)	71.6 (182)
Average precipitation days (≥ 0.01 in)	19.1	14.5	14.6	15.1	14.1	13.7	13.0	11.5	11.5	15.0	15.3	17.7	175.1
Average snowy days (≥ 0.1 in)	11.0	8.6	5.5	1.4	0.0	0.0	0.0	0.0	0.0	0.2	3.5	8.1	38.3
Source: NOAA

== Demographics ==
Historical population
Census	Pop.	Note	%±
1840	737		—
1850	1,013		37.4%
1860	1,738		71.6%
1870	2,014		15.9%
1880	2,810		39.5%
1890	4,332		54.2%
1900	8,043		85.7%
1910	11,080		37.8%
1920	14,272		28.8%
1930	14,863		4.1%
1940	14,891		0.2%
1950	14,849		−0.3%
1960	14,505		−2.3%
1970	12,998		−10.4%
1980	12,146		−6.6%
1990	11,122		−8.4%
2000	10,259		−7.8%
2010	9,710		−5.4%
2020	9,404		−3.2%
2023 (est.)	9,125		−3.0%

=== 2020 census ===
As of the 2020 census, Warren had a population of 9,404. The median age was 41.1 years. 20.5% of residents were under the age of 18 and 19.7% of residents were 65 years of age or older. For every 100 females there were 94.7 males, and for every 100 females age 18 and over there were 93.2 males age 18 and over.

100.0% of residents lived in urban areas, while 0.0% lived in rural areas.

There were 4,206 households in Warren, of which 23.8% had children under the age of 18 living in them. Of all households, 36.3% were married-couple households, 21.6% were households with a male householder and no spouse or partner present, and 33.2% were households with a female householder and no spouse or partner present. About 39.8% of all households were made up of individuals and 17.5% had someone living alone who was 65 years of age or older.

There were 4,794 housing units, of which 12.3% were vacant. The homeowner vacancy rate was 2.2% and the rental vacancy rate was 10.7%.

Racial composition as of the 2020 census
Race	Number	Percent
White	8,693	92.4%
Black or African American	87	0.9%
American Indian and Alaska Native	25	0.3%
Asian	55	0.6%
Native Hawaiian and Other Pacific Islander	1	0.0%
Some other race	46	0.5%
Two or more races	497	5.3%
Hispanic or Latino (of any race)	125	1.3%

=== 2000 census ===
As of 2000 census, there were 10,259 people, 4,565 households, and 2,606 families residing in the city. The population density was 3,508.3 inhabitants per square mile (1,354.6/km^{2}). There were 5,046 housing units at an average density of 1,725.6 per square mile (666.3/km^{2}). The racial makeup of the city was 98.53% White, 0.20% African American, 0.20% Native American, 0.36% Asian, 0.02% Pacific Islander, 0.13% from other races, and 0.56% from two or more races. Hispanic or Latino of any race were 0.39% of the population.

There were 4,566 households, out of which 27.2% had children under the age of 18 living with them, 43.0% were married couples living together, 10.8% had a female householder with no husband present, and 42.9% were non-families. 37.6% of all households were made up of individuals, and 16.4% had someone living alone who was 65 years of age or older. The average household size was 2.17 and the average family size was 2.87.

In the city, the population was spread out, with 23.1% under the age of 18, 7.0% from 18 to 24, 28.4% from 25 to 44, 23.4% from 45 to 64, and 18.1% who were 65 years of age or older. The median age was 39 years. For every 100 females, there were 88.5 males. For every 100 females age 18 and over, there were 83.9 males.

The median income for a household in the city was $32,384, and the median income for a family was $41,986. Males had a median income of $32,049 versus $22,969 for females. The per capita income for the city was $18,272. About 8.0% of families and 10.7% of the population were below the poverty line, including 11.5% of those under age 18 and 6.0% of those age 65 or over.

== Sports ==
Warren hosted minor league baseball in three different leagues. The 1895 "Warren" team first played minor league baseball as members of the Iron and Oil League. Between 1908 and 1916, Warren hosted the Warren Blues (1908), Warren Bingoes (1914–1915) and Warren Warriors (1916) teams, who all played as members of the Class D level Interstate League.

From 1926 to 1939 Warren was home to a professional basketball team. Led by player/coach/manager/owner Gerry Archibald the team changed names frequently to reflect its current sponsor. In 1937, as the Warren Penns, they became a charter member of the National Basketball League (United States). In the middle of the 1938-39 season Archibald moved the team to Cleveland.

In 1940 and 1941, the Warren Redskins and Warren Buckeyes played in the Class D level Pennsylvania State Association. The team was a minor league affiliate of the Cleveland Indians in 1940. The Warren teams played home minor league games at Russell Park.

== Education ==
For public K-12 education, the Warren County School District provides two elementary schools (Eisenhower, Warren Area), two elementary-middle schools (Youngsville, Sheffield Area), and three middle-high schools (Beaty-Warren, Eisenhower, and Warren Area).

Northern Pennsylvania Regional College (or NPRC) is an open-admissions college established in 2017 and, as of May 28, 2019, is authorized by the Pennsylvania Department of Education to grant degrees and certificates in the Commonwealth of Pennsylvania.

The Warren County Career Center is an area vocational-technical school serving only the students in the Warren County School District. The Career Center provides training in multiple vocational fields to students in grades 10 through 12.

== Notable people ==
- Earl Hanley Beshlin, former U.S. Congressman
- Joe Brown, former professional baseball player, Baltimore Orioles and Chicago Whitestockings
- William F. Clinger, former U.S. Congressman
- Gudrun Ensslin, founder member of Red Army Faction, a militant urban group in Germany
- Alice Isabel Hazeltine, librarian, editor, and writer
- Art Johnson, baseball player
- Ed O'Neil, NFL player and All American
- Tom Tellmann, former professional baseball player, Milwaukee Brewers, Oakland Athletics, and San Diego Padres

== See also ==
- Oil Creek Railroad
