= New Castle Quakers =

- 1895–1900; New Castle, Pennsylvania

Minor league affiliations
- Class: Class C (1895-1896); Class B (1897-1900)
- League: Iron and Oil League (1895); Interstate League (1896-1900)

Major league affiliations
- Team: None

Minor league titles
- League titles (1): 1899
- Wild card berths (0): None

Team data
- Name: New Castle Quakers (1895-1900)
- Ballpark: Pearson Park (1895-1897); Cascade Park (1898-1900)

The New Castle Quakers were a minor league baseball team based in New Castle, Pennsylvania. The Quakers played as members of the 1895 Iron and Oil League before becoming members of the Class D level Interstate League from 1896 to 1900, winning the 1899 league title.

The New Castle Quakers hosted home minor league games at Pearson Park through 1897 before moving to the new Cascade Park for the next two seasons.

== History ==
=== 1895 Iron & Oil League ===
The city first hosted minor league baseball in 1883, when the New Castle "Nashannocks" team played as members of the Western Interstate League. In 1884, the team continued play in the Iron & Oil Association, finishing in fourth place with a 20–24 record.

The New Castle "Quakers" resumed minor league play in 1895, as the team became charter members of the eight-team, Class C level Iron and Oil League. The Franklin Braves, Oil City Oilers, Sharon, Titusville, Twin Cities Twins, Warren and Wheeling Nailers teams joined New Castle in beginning league play on May 15, 1895.

In their first season of play, the Quakers finished in fourth place. New Castle ended the season with a record of 40–33. Playing the season under manager Will Thompson, the Quakers finished 2.5 games behind the first place Franklin Braves in the final standings. The Iron and Oil League folded following the season.

=== 1896 to 1900 Interstate League ===
In 1896, New Castle continued hosting minor league play, with the franchise joining a new league. The Quakers became members of the reformed six–team Class C level Interstate League. The 1896 team was also referred to under the "Salamanders" nickname. The Fort Wayne Farmers, Jackson Wolverines, Saginaw Lumbermen, Toledo Swamp Angels, Washington Little Senators, Wheeling Nailers and Youngstown Puddlers teams joined New Castle in beginning league play on May 6, 1896.

In their first season of play in the new league, the Quakers placed fifth in the 1896 Interstate League standings. Completing the season with an overall record of 53–59, New Castle finished 20.0 games behind the first place Toledo Swamp Angels, with Jay Faatz and M. C. Whitehill serving as managers. Jake Ganzel of New Castle led the league with 17 home runs.

The 1897 New Castle Quakers placed third in the Interstate League final standings, as the league became a Class B level league. The Quakers ended the season with a record of 63–54 as Paul Russell served as manager. New Castle ended the season 11.0 games behind the first place Toledo Mud Hens.

In 1898, the Quakers placed fourth in the Interstate League final standings, as the league continued play as an eight-team. Class B level league. Compiling a record of 81–69, playing the season under manager Dad Lytle, New Castle finished 3.5 games behind the first place Dayton Old Soldiers. Pitcher Charlie Smith of New Castle led the league with 184 strikeouts.

The 1899 New Castle Quakers won the Interstate League Championship. With a regular season record of 87–53, New Castle was managed by Pat Wright. After beginning the season with a 42–39 record through July 27, the team then went 45–14 to capture the league championship. In the final regular season standings, the Drillers finished just 1.0 game ahead of the second place Mansfield Haymakers (86-54).

The 1899 Quakers had the distinction of having four 20-game winners on their pitching staff: Charlie Smith (20-9), Jack Wadsworth (24-13), Oscar Streit (21-13) and Frank Figgemeier (20-13). All four pitchers advanced to the major leagues.

In their final season of Interstate League play, the 1900 New Castle Quakers finished last in the eight-team league after winning the championship the season before. New Castle ended the season with a record of 44–95 as Pat Wright returned as manager. The Quakers finished 49.0 games behind the first place Dayton Veterans in the final standings. The Fort Wayne Indians won a playoff with Dayton to claim the championship.

The Interstate League did not return to play in 1901. New Castle next hosted minor league baseball when the 1906 New Castle Outlaws began play as members of the Class C level Ohio-Pennsylvania League.

== The ballparks ==
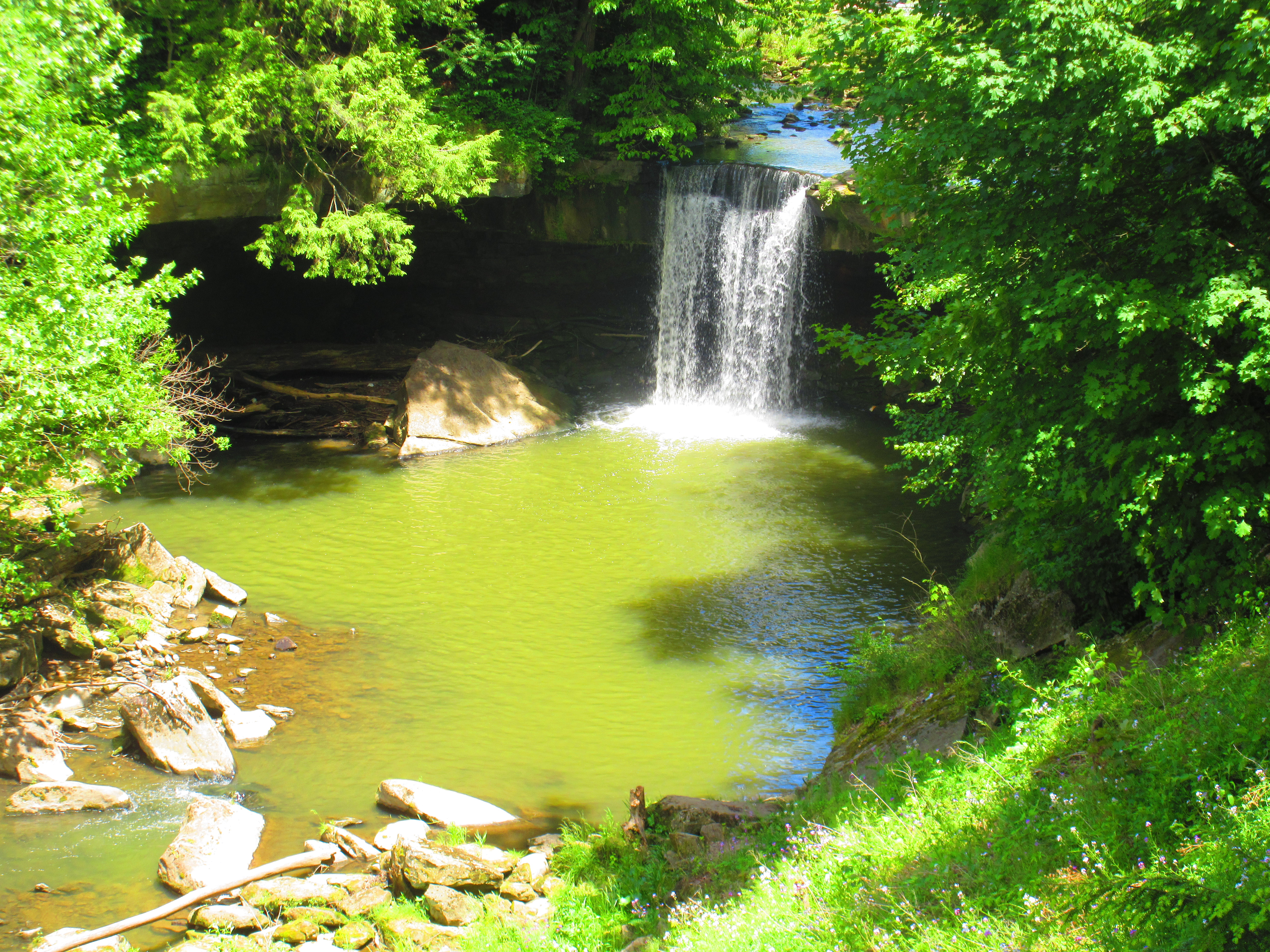
(2020) Waterfall at Cascade Park. A roller coaster once crossed the waterway just downstream from the falls. New Castle, Pennsylvania.

New Castle teams played in two ballparks between 1895 and 1900.

From 1895 to 1897, the New Castle Quakers teams hosted home Interstate League minor league games at Pearson Park. Located within the Neshannock Township, Pearson Park is still in use today as a public park, with 105 acres containing two ballfields and other amenities. The park is located at 179 Pearson Park Drive, New Castle.

After the 1898, season, the Quakers moved to the new Cascade Park ballpark. The ballpark was located at East Washington Street & Cascade Boulevard in New Castle. In 1897, the New Castle Traction Company (later known as the Pennsylvania Power Company), bought the property from Col. Levi Brinton, who had purchased the land in 1892. Named after a waterfall within the park, Cascade Park opened on May 29, 1897. In 1898, park owners added a carousel, the baseball park, theater, and dance pavilion to the park. The pavilion is still standing today. In the era, the dance pavilion was noted to be the largest in the state of Pennsylvania. A trolly system ran to the park in the era, transporting as many as 7,200 people in a day via trolly. Today, Cascade Park is still in use as a public park. It is located at 1928 East Washington Street in New Castle.

== Timeline ==
Year(s)	# Yrs.	Team	Level	League	Ballpark
1895	1	New Castle Quakers	Class C	Iron and Oil League	Pearson Park
1986	1	New Castle Quakers	Class C	Interstate League	Pearson Park
1897	1	New Castle Quakers	Class B	Interstate League	Pearson Park
1898-1900	3	New Castle Quakers	Class B	Interstate League	Cascade Park

== Year–by–year records ==
Year	Record	Finish	Manager	Playoffs/notes
1895	40–33	4th	Will Thompson	No playoffs held
1896	53–59	5th	Jay Faatz / M. C. Whitehill	No playoffs held
1897	72–54	3rd	Paul Russell	No playoffs held
1898	81–69	4th	Dad Lytle	No playoffs held
1899	87–53	1st	Pat Wright	League champions No playoffs held
1900	44–95	8th	Pat Wright	Did not qualify

== Notable alumni ==
- Charlie Babb (1896)
- Bobby Cargo (1899-1900)
- Fred Donovan (1896-1898)
- Davey Dunkle (1897)
- John Farrell (1899)
- Jay Faatz (1896, MGR)
- Frank Figgemeier (1899-1900)
- Tom Fleming (1897)
- Fred Frank (1900)
- John Ganzel (1896)
- Whitey Guese (1898)
- Jake Hewitt (1896-1898)
- Charlie Hickman (1896-1897)
- Charlie Jordan (1900)
- Tacks Latimer (1900)
- Tom Lipp (1897)
- Dad Lytle (1897; 1898, MGR)
- Walter McCredie (1900)
- Monte McFarland (1900)
- Bert Miller (1897-1898)
- Kohly Miller (1897, 1899–1900)
- Tim O'Rourke (1897)
- Abner Powell (1897)
- Joe Rickert (1896-1898)
- Paul Russell (1897, MGR)
- Charlie Smith (1899)
- Bill Sowders (1896)
- John Sowders (1896)
- Oscar Streit (1899-1900)
- Suter Sullivan (1896)
- Cy Swaim (1896)
- Deacon Van Buren (1899-1900)
- Rube Vickers (1900)
- Jack Wadsworth (1899-1900)
- Pete Woodruff (1897)
- Pat Wright (1899-1900, MGR)

== See also ==
- New Castle Quakers players
- New Castle Salamanders players
