= Dayton Veterans =

- 1899–1917; (1897–1901, 1903–1917); Dayton, Ohio

Minor league affiliations
- Class: Class B (1897–1900); Class A (1901); Class B (1903–1917)
- League: Interstate League (1896–1900); Western Association (1901); Central League (1903–1917)

Major league affiliations
- Team: None

Minor league titles
- League titles (5): 1898; 1901; 1911; 1914; 1916
- Conference titles (1): 1900
- Wild card berths (1): 1897

Team data
- Name: Dayton Old Soldiers (1897–1898); Dayton Veterans (1899–1900); Dayton Old Soldiers (1901); Dayton Veterans (1903–1917)
- Ballpark: Fairview Park (1897–1901, 1903–1912); Highland Park (1913–1917)

The Dayton Veterans were a minor league baseball team based in Dayton, Ohio between 1899 and 1917. From 1896 to 1900, the Dayton "Old Soldiers" and "Veterans" teams played as members of the Class B level Interstate League, followed by a single season in the 1901 Class A level Western Association. Beginning in 1903, the Dayton Veterans teams played the next fifteen seasons as members of the Class B level Central League. Dayton won league championships in 1898, 1901, 1911, 1914 and 1916.

Two Baseball Hall of Fame members played for Dayton. Jesse Haines played briefly for the 1913 Dayton Veterans and Elmer Flick played for the 1897 Dayton Old Soldiers.

The Dayton teams hosted all home minor league baseball home games at Fairview Park through 1912 and at Highland Park beginning in 1913.

== History ==
=== Interstate League 1897 to 1900 ===
In the late 1860s, Dayton was home to organized baseball. The "Dayton Baseball Club" was founded. The team played an exhibition game against the Cincinnati Red Stockings in 1869.

Minor league baseball began in Dayton in 1883, when the "Dayton Gem Cities" team played as members of the Independent level Ohio State League. After minor league seasons in various leagues, the 1891 "Dayton" team of the independent Northwestern League preceded the Old Soldiers in minor league play.

After a four-season hiatus, Dayton continued minor league play, becoming members the 1896 Interstate League and beginning a four-year tenure in the Class B level league.

In 1897, the Dayton "Old Soldiers" began play as members of the Class B level Interstate League. The Fort Wayne Indians. Mansfield Haymakers, New Castle Quakers, Springfield Governors, Toledo Mud Hens, Wheeling Nailers and Youngstown Puddlers teams joined Fort Wayne in beginning league play on May 2, 1897.

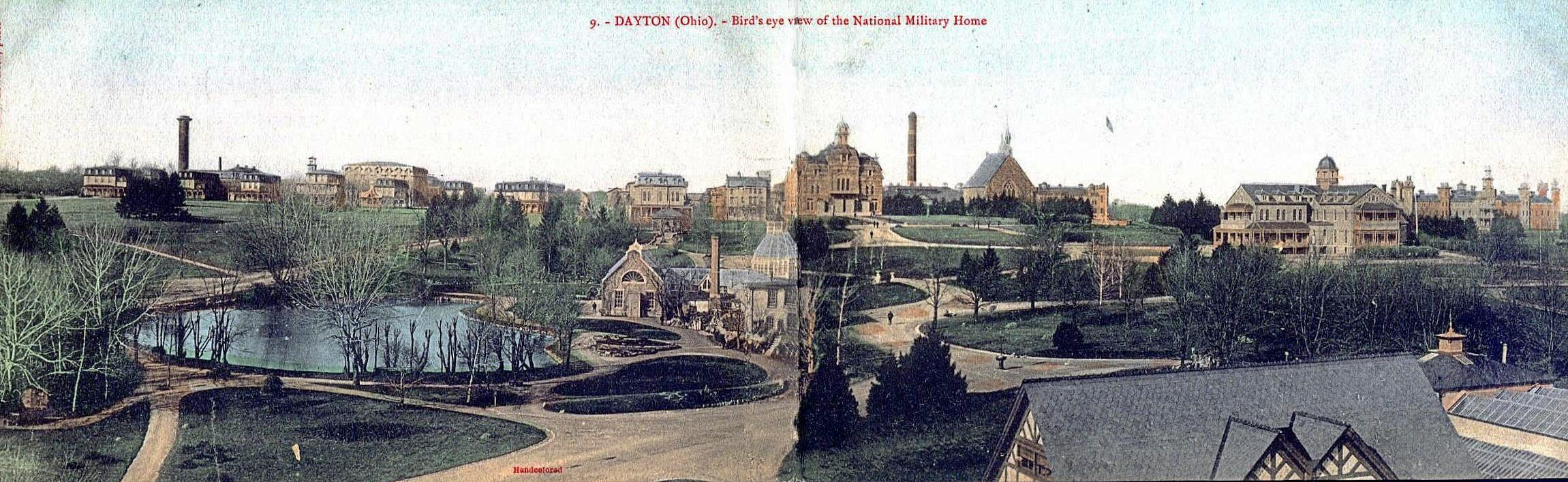
(1906) National Home for Disabled Volunteer Soldiers. Dayton, Ohio.

The Dayton "Old Soldiers" and "Veterans" nickname correspond with Dayton facilities and history. The National Home for Disabled Volunteer Soldiers was located in Dayton, Ohio. At its peak, the Soldier's Home housed more than 7,000 veterans. The site contained a working farm, workshops, two churches and a school. The National Home and its amenities also became a tourist attraction for the public, as over 660,000 people visited the home in 1910. The Soldiers National Home was built in 1867 and is on the National Register of Historic Places.

Baseball Hall of Fame member Elmer Flick played for the Old Soldiers in 1897. With Dayton, Flick had 183 total hits, with 29 doubles, 10 home runs, and a league-leading 20 triples, with a .386 batting average. Flick also stole 25 bases and scored 135 runs in 126 games. Youngsters at Dayton games would chant, "Elmer Flick, you are slick. Hit a homer pretty quick." Flick's performances with Dayton led to George Stallings, manager of the Philadelphia Phillies, to sign Flick to a major league contract for the 1898 season.

In their first season of play, the 1897 Dayton Old Soldiers qualified for the league finals. The Interstate was elevated to become a Class B level league. The Ols Soldiers had a record of 71–51 in the eight-team league to end the season in second place, playing under managers Frank Torreyson and Bill Armour. Dayton ended the season 8.5 games behind the first place Toldeo Mud Hens and qualified for a playoff final. The playoff was won by Toledo over the Dayton Old Soldiers 4 games to 2. Dayton's Joe Reiman hit 17 home runs to lead the Interstate League.

Bill Armor was the principal owner of the Dayton franchise, besides becoming manager of the team. In August 1897, the Sporting Life wrote that it was "one of the best teams that ever represented Dayton" and that Armour was "getting very good work out of the boys, who are all satisfied with his management."

Continuing in Interstate League play, the 1898 Dayton Old Soldiers won the league championship. The Old Soldiers ended the season in first place in the Class B level league, playing the season under returning manager Bill Armour. Dayton ended the 1898 season with a record of 84–65, finishing just 0.5 game ahead of the second place Toledo Mud Hens in the eight-team league. No playoff was held. Joe Reiman of Dayton again led the league in home runs, hitting 14 to lead the Interstate League.

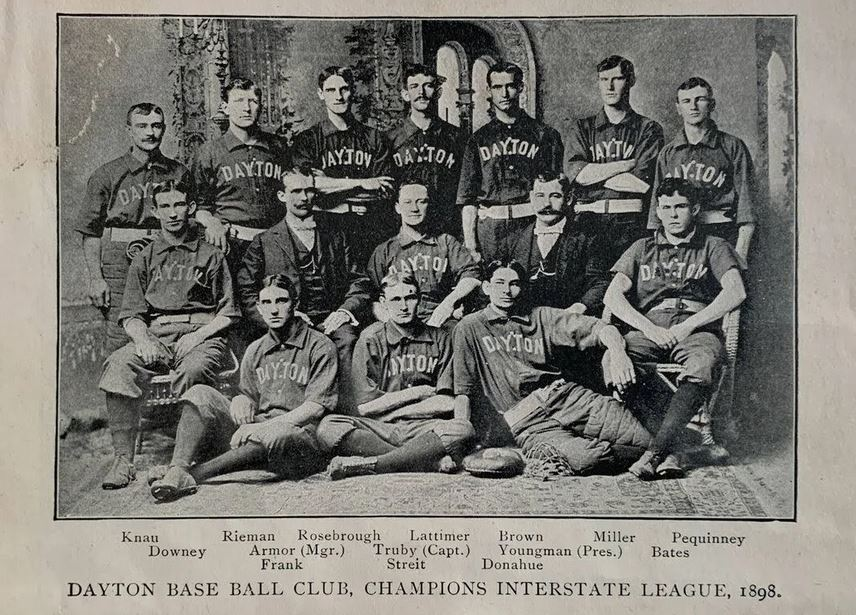
1898 Dayton Old Soldiers. The team won the championship in the Interstate League.

The 1899 Dayton team became known as the Dayton "Veterans" and placed seventh in the eight-team Interstate League final standings. The Veterans ended the season with a final record of 55–85, playing under manager Bill Armor. Dayton ended the season 32.0 games behind the first place New Castle Quakers in the Class B level league. No league playoffs were held.

In the 1900 season, the Dayton Veterans played their final Interstate League season and won the league pennant. With a regular season record of 90–43, the Veterans played the season under manager Bill Armor. Dayton ended the regular season in first-place finishing 7.5 games ahead of the second place Fort Wayne Indians. A playoff final was held between the top two teams in the standings. Fort Wayne won the league championship by defeating Dayton 4 games to 3.

The Interstate League folded following the 1900 season, and Dayton continued play in 1901 in a new league, winning the league championship.

=== Western Association 1901 ===
Dayton continued minor league play in 1901, as the "Old Soldiers" became members of the eight-team Class A level Western Association, winning the league championship, with Bill Armor continuing as manager. The Columbus Senators, Grand Rapids Woodworkers, Fort Wayne Railroaders, Indianapolis Hoosiers, Louisville Colonels, Toledo Mud Hens and Wheeling Stogies joined Dayton in the league, which reformed after not playing in 1900.

On April 14, 1901, Dayton hosted an exhibition game against the Pittsburgh Pirates at Fairview Park. Honus Wagner played for Pittsburgh who beat Dayton 3–2 in 11-innings. Wagner drove in two runs in the contest.

On April 16, 1901, the Cincinnati Reds played an exhibition at Dayton with Bid McPhee as manager. Cincinnati beat Dayton by the score of 7–3 in the exhibition.

On April 26, 1901, Dayton played their home opener and beat Columbus 15–1 with 900 fans in attendance.

During the season, a baseball rarity occurred when Clarence "Gene" Wright of Dayton threw consecutive no hitters. On Sept. 1 and 4, 1901, Wright no-hit the Columbus Senators, 9–0, and the Grand Rapids Woodworkers, 2–0, in consecutive starts for the Dayton Old Soldiers.

The 1901 "Old Soldiers" won the Western Association championship, ending the regular season in first place, as the league held no playoffs. Dayton ended the season with a record of 84–55 to finish 1.0 games ahead of the second place Grand Rapids Woodworkers. Germany Smith of Dayton had 52 stolen bases to lead the Western Association.

The Western Association folded following the 1901 season and the league did not return to play in 1902.

=== Central League 1903 to 1910 ===
After the Western Association folded, Dayton was without a minor league team in 1902 and former owner/manager Bill Armor left Dayton to become manager of the Cleveland Bronchos of the American League. With Cleveland, Armor signed future Baseball Hall of Fame inductee Nap Lajoie. Lajoie received the largest salary ever given to a player. Armor said, "For his services with our club he will receive $28,000 for four years, every cent of which he will he paid, play or not, as the courts may direct. This is the largest salary ever paid a baseball player."

Minor league baseball returned in 1903, when the Dayton Veterans resumed play, becoming members of the Class B level Central League and beginning a fifteen-year tenure as members of the league. With a record of 61–76, Dayton ended their first season of play in the new league in sixth place. The Veterans finished 27.5 games behind the first place Fort Wayne Railroaders. Fort Wayne was followed by the Anderson/Grand Rapids Orphans (48–92), Dayton Veterans (61–76) Evansville River Rats (64–68), Marion Oilworkers (71–65), Terre Haute Hottentots (58–80) South Bend Green Stockings (88–50) and Wheeling Stogies (69–68) teams in the final standings. Henry Youngman managed the Veterans in 1903.

Dayton continued play in the Central League in 1904. On August 21, 1904, an indecent occurred in Dayton's game that day. Albert Minor, who was pitching for the Evansville River Rats against the Dayton Veterans, left the field in the middle of the game in anger. During the game Minor had attempted a pick off in the fifth inning and overthrew the base, with the ball going into the stands. After the play, Minor threw his glove on the ground, promptly left the field and did not return. Minor was fined $200 by his team over the incident and then left the team six days later over "dissention" related to the incident. Minor was banned from playing for other teams until the $200 fine was paid.

The Dayton Veterans of the Central League placed fifth in 1904, playing the season under managers John Spaatz, Charles Jewell and Hub Knoll. The Veterans finished with a record of 68–69 in the eight-team Class B level Central League, ending the season 18.5 games behind the first place Fort Wayne Railroaders in the final league standings.

For a second consecutive season, the 1905, Dayton Veterans placed fifth as the team continued play in the eight-team Class B level Central League. Managed by the returning Hub Knoll, the Veterans placed fifth in the league a 70–63 regular season record. Dayton finished 10.0 games behind the first place Wheeling Stogies in the final standings. No league playoffs were held.

The Veterans ended the 1906 Class B Central League season in fourth place. With a final record of 78–71, Dayton had five managers during the season, as Hub Knoll, John Thornton, Jimmy Barrett, Ted McKinley and Ed McKean managed the team. No playoffs were held in the eight-team league and Dayton ended the season 20.0 games behind the first place Grand Rapids Wolverines in the Central League final standings. Pitcher Roy Hale of Dayton led the Central League in winning percentage with his 12–2 record.

In 1907 Ed McKean returned to manage the Dayton Veterans to begin the season. With a final record of 66–71, the Veterans were managed during the season by Ed McKean, Bill Richardson and Mal Kittridge. Dayton ended the season 21.0 games behind the first place Springfield Babes. Dayton Veterans player Bill Richardson led the Central League with 7 home runs.

Dayton Veterans placed third in the 1908 eight-team Central League. The Veterans finished with a record of 77–63, playing the season under manager Bade Myers. Dayton ended the season finishing 7.0 games behind the first place Evansville River Rats. John Rowan of Dayton led the Central League with 232 strikeouts.

In 1909 Dayton finished in the basement of the eight-team Class B level Central League, as Bade Myers returned to manage the Veterans The Veterans ended the season with a final record of 56–77 and finished 27.0 games behind the league champion Wheeling Stooges.

In 1910, Dolly Stark was purchased from Dayton by the Brooklyn Dodgers for $300. Stark later became an umpire after his playing career ended.

In the 1910 season, the Dayton Veterans continued play in the eight-team Central League and placed an improved third place in the final standings. The Veterans finished with a regular season record 74–63, playing the season under manager Punch Knoll. Dayton ended the season 14.5 games behind the first place South Bend Bronchos in the final league standings, as the league held no playoffs. Pitcher Walt Justis of Dayton had 177 strikeouts to lead the Central Association.

=== Central League - 1911 to 1917 ===
The 1911 Dayton Veterans won the league championship in the eight-team Central League. Dayton ended the 1911 Central League season as the champions with a record of 86–51, playing the season under returning manager Punch Knoll. The Veterans ended the season 3.0 games ahead of the second place Fort Wayne Railroaders in the final standings of the Class B league. Player/manager Punch Knoll had 11 home runs to lead the Central League and Marion Kilpatrick scored a league leading 96 runs. Pitcher Jack Compton of Dayton led the league with 22 wins.

The Class B Central League expanded by four teams in 1912, as the Dayton Veterans looked to defend their championship. The Akron Rubbermen, Canton Statesmen, Erie Sailors and Youngstown Steelmen teams joined the league increasing it to twelve teams.

On the field, the Dayton Veterans placed fifth in the 12–team Central League, after the league had expanded. Dayton ended the season with a record of 73–53, finishing 4.0 games behind the champion Fort Wayne Railroaders. Punch Knoll again managed the Veterans, as 12–team league held no playoffs.

Moving to Highland Park from Fairview Park beginning with the 1913 season, Dayton drew 4,661 fans for their 1913 home opener.

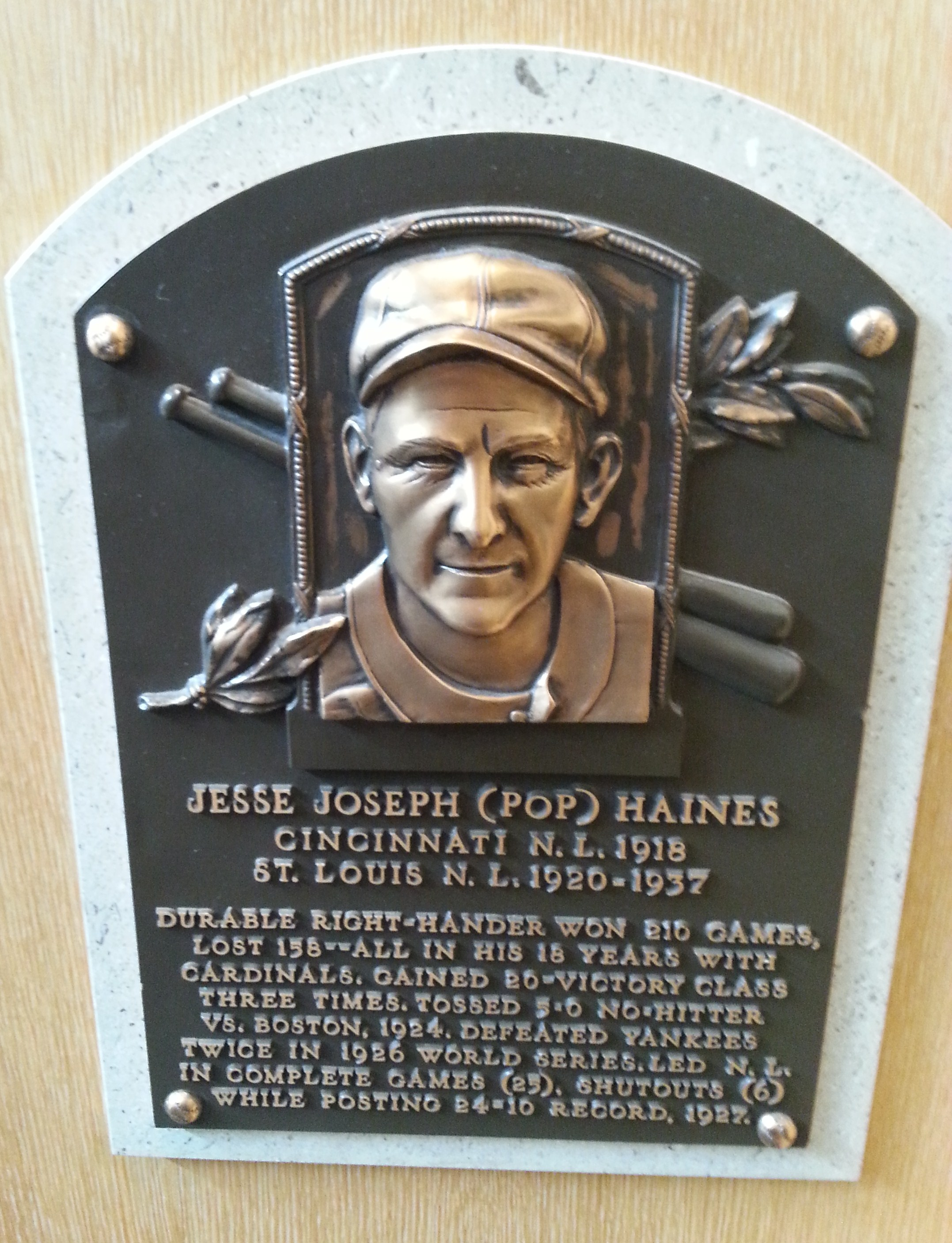
Jesse Haines. Baseball Hall of Fame plaque.

Baseball Hall of Fame member Jesse Haines pitched briefly for Dayton in 1913.

Continuing play in the Central League, the 1913 Dayton Veterans placed fourth as the Central League reduced six teams. The Veterans continued play in the 1913 Central League, as the Central League reduced from twelve teams to six teams and remained a Class B level league. In the final standings of the six-team 1913 Central League, the Dayton Veterans had an overall record of 62–77, playing the season under manager John Nee. Dayton finished 29.5 games behind the first place Grand Rapids Bill-eds (92–48) in the final standings. The league held no playoffs. Pop Shaw of Dayton 175 total hits to lead the Central Association.

The 1914 Dayton Veterans won the league championship as the Class B Central League played the season as a six-team league. John Nee returned to manage Dayton, as the Veterans ended the season with a 85–49 record. After the Springfield Reapers team folded on August 8, and the Central League plated the remainder of the season with five teams, concluding the league schedule on September 7, 1914. Dayton ended the season 8.5 games ahead of the second place Evansville River Rats, as no league playoffs were held. Veterans player Arista DeHaven Dayton scored lead leading 96 runs.

The Dayton Veterans went from first to last in the 1915 Central League. The league continued play and expanded to become an eight-team league. Dayton ended the season in eight place with a 43–79 record in the final Central League standings. The Veterans played the season under manager Jack Compton who had a tenure as a player for Dayton. Dayton finished 29.0 games behind the first place Evansville River Rats in the Central League final standings.

The Central League continued play as a Class B league in 1916, as the Dayton Veterans continued in league play and won the league championship. With the league playing a split season schedule, Dayton won the first half pennant and qualified for the playoff. The Veterans ended the regular season with a record of 73–57, placing second under manager John Nee, who returned as manager after a one-season absence. Dayton finished 3.0 games behind the first place Grand Rapids Black Sox in the final overall standings, but the Springfield Reapers qualified for the playoff winning second half pennant in the split season schedule. In the playoff, Dayton defeated Springfield 4 games to 2 to win the championship. Dayton's Ray Spencer won the league batting title, hitting .343 and also had a league leading 84 runs and 170 total hits. Pitcher Nick Lakaff of Dayton had 25 wins to lead the league.

In 1917, the Dayton Veterans played their final season in the eight-team Central League before the league folded. The Veterans placed seventh in the Central League under manager John Nee. Dayton had a final record of 44–68 and finished 30.0 games behind the first place Grand Rapids Black Sox in the final overall standings. No playoffs were held.

The Central League folded following the 1917 season in the midst of World War I. The league eventually reformed in 1920 playing through 1926 without a Dayton franchise.

Dayton was without minor league baseball until the 1928 Dayton Aviators resumed play. The Aviators were a member of the reformed Central League from 1928 to 1930.

Today, Dayton still hosts minor league baseball. The Dayton Dragons, play as a member of the Class A level Midwest League. The franchise began Midwest League play in 2000.

== The ballparks ==
The Dayton Old Soldiers and Dayton Veterans minor league teams hosted minor league home games through 1912 at Fariview Park. The ballpark was located at the northwest corner N. Main Street & W. Fairview Avenue in Dayton, Ohio. Today, the ballpark no longer exists, and the site is residential. The park opened in 1897 and also contained the Fairview Amusement Park in the era. The amusement park closed in 1915. After the closing of the amusement park, the site contained the C.J. Brown School, which was built on the infield portion of the baseball field. The school no longer exists. Today, Dayton Fire Station #14 occupies the site at 2213 North Main Street in Dayton, Ohio.

Beginning with the 1913 season, the Dayton Veterans moved home games to Highland Park. Highland Park had no streetcar service to the park. The ballpark was located in East Dayton near Santa Cruz Avenue in the era. Today, Highland Park still in use as a public park. The park is located at 1701 Wyoming Street on the corner of Wyoming Street at Steve Whalen Boulevard in Dayton, Ohio.

== Timeline ==
Year(s)	# Yrs.	Team	Level	League	Ballpark
1897–1898	2	Dayton Old Soldiers	Class B	Interstate League	Fairview Park
1899–1900	2	Dayton Veterans	Class B	Interstate League	Fairview Park
1901	1	Dayton Old Soldiers	Class A	Western Association	Fairview Park
1903–1912	10	Dayton Veterans	Class B	Central League	Fairview Park
1913–1917	5	Dayton Veterans	Class B	Central League	Highland Park

== Year-by-year records ==
Year	Record	Finish	Manager	Playoffs / Notes
1897	74–51	2nd	Frank Torreyson / Bill Armour	Lost in finals
1898	84–65	1st	Bill Armour	League champions No playoffs held
1899	55–85	7th	Bill Armour	No playoffs held
1900	90–43	1st	Bill Armour	Won league pennant Lost in final
1901	85–55	1st	Bill Armour	League champions No playoffs held
1903	61–76	6th	Henry Youngman	No playoffs held
1904	68–69	5th	John Spaatz / Charles Jewell; Hub Knoll	No playoffs held
1905	70–64	5th	Hub Knoll	No playoffs held
1906	78–71	4th	John Thornton / Jimmy Barrett; Hub Knoll / McKinley / Ed McKean	No playoffs held
1907	66–71	5th	Ed McKean / Bill Richardson; Mal Kittridge	No playoffs held
1908	77–63	3rd	Bade Myers	No playoffs held
1909	56–77	8th	Bade Myers	Did not qualify
1910	74–63	3rd	Punch Knoll	No playoffs held
1911	86–51	1st	Punch Knoll	League champions No playoffs held
1912	73–56	5th	Punch Knoll	No playoffs held (12-team league)
1913	62–77	4th	John Nee	No playoffs held
1914	85–49	1st	John Nee	League champions No playoffs held
1915	43–79	8th	Jack Compton	No playoffs held
1916	73–57	2nd	John Nee	League champions Defeated Springfield in finals
1917	44–68	7th	John Nee	No playoffs held

== Notable alumni ==
- Elmer Flick (1897) Inducted Baseball Hall of Fame, 1963
- Jesse Haines (1913) Inducted Baseball Hall of Fame, 1970
- Bill Armour (1897–1901, MGR)
- Jimmy Austin (1904–1906)
- Bill Bailey (1907)
- Harvey Bailey (1904)
- Mike Balenti (1909)
- Jimmy Barrett (1906, MGR)
- Frank Bates (1897–1898)
- Dick Bayless (1908)
- Harry Berte (1899, 1908–1910)
- Bob Bescher (1908)
- Bert Blue (1901)
- Sam Brenegan (1917)
- Charlie Brown (1897–1899)
- Joe Burke (1899)
- Jack Burns (1900–1901)
- Donie Bush (1906)
- Bill Byers (1898)
- Nick Carter (1899)
- Jack Compton (1911–1914; 1915, MGR)
- Frank Cross (1901, 1906)
- Gene Curtis (1907)
- Cliff Daringer (1908)
- Jiggs Donahue (1898–1900)
- Pat Donahue (1917)
- Patsy Dougherty (1898)
- Frank Donnelly (1899–1900)
- Wiley Dunham (1901)
- Hack Eibel (1912)
- Frank Emmer (1916)
- Charlie Emig (1897)
- Clyde Engle (1904)
- Steve Evans (1907)
- Pete Fahrer (1914–1915)
- Fred Frank (1898–1900)
- Nig Fuller (1905)
- Welcome Gaston (1900)
- Patsy Gharrity (1914)
- George Gillpatrick (1899–1900)
- Frank Gleich (1917)
- John Gochnaur (1900–1901)
- Roy Golden (1909)
- George Grosart (1901)
- Ray Hale (1906–1908)
- Scott Hardesty (1900)
- John Hinton (1909)
- Bill Hobbs (1914–1917)
- Marty Hogan (1897)
- John Halla (1906)
- Shags Horan (1915)
- Otto Jacobs (1916)
- Ollie Johns (1906–1908)
- Alex Jones (1901)
- Jim Jones (1915)
- Walt Justis (1910)
- Al Kaiser (1908)
- Billy Kelly (1908–1910)
- Brickyard Kennedy (1906–1908)
- Enos Kirkpatrick (1911)
- Malachi Kittridge (1907, MGR)
- Punch Knoll (1910–1912, MGR)
- Mike Konnick (1911–1912)
- Charlie Krause (1904)
- Rube Kroh (1917)
- Andy Kyle (1915)
- Tacks Latimer (1898)
- John Lovett (1901)
- Herm Malloy (1907)
- George McConnell (1903)
- Ed McKean (1906–1907, MGR)
- Karl Meister (1914)
- Bart Miller (1899)
- Doggie Miller (1903, MGR)
- Earl Moore (1899–1900)
- Frank Morrissey (1898)
- Red Munson (1907)
- Bade Myers (1908–1909, MGR)
- Bill Otey (1911–1912, 1914)
- Dode Paskert (1905–1906)
- Bunny Pearce (1909)
- Harry Pearce (1913)
- Wiley Piatt (1897)
- Dave Pickett (1904, 1906)
- Cy Pieh (1913)
- Bill Richardson (1906; 1907, MGR; 1908)
- William Rohrer (1908–1910)
- Eli Rosebraugh (1897–1898, 1900)
- Jack Rowan (1912–1917)
- Ike Samuels (1897)
- Lou Schettler (1917)
- Jack Schulte (1907)
- Danny Shay (1897)
- Johnny Siegle (1899)
- Hack Simmons (1907)
- Hosea Siner (1907)
- Ed Smith (1904–1905)
- Germany Smith (1901)
- Rudy Sommers (1911)
- Ray Spencer (1916)
- Dolly Stark (1910)
- Oscar Streit (1898)
- Phil Stremmel (1913–1914)
- Tuffy Stewart (1916–1917)
- Hughie Tate (1903)
- Jack Taylor (1910–1911)
- John Thornton (1906, MGR)
- Harry Truby (1898)
- Paul Wachtel (1914–1916)
- Jimmy Wacker (1910–1911)
- Hooks Warner (1915–1916)
- Bill Warren (1913)
- Lefty Webb (1913)
- Joe Werrick (1899)
- Ed Wheeler (1900–1901)
- Charlie Whitehouse (1916–1917)
- Bob Wicker (1900–1901)
- Al Wickland (1912–1913)
- Gene Wright (1901)
- Earl Yingling (1906–1909)
- Del Young (1910)
- Henry Youngman (1897–1899, 1903, MGR)

== See also ==
- Dayton Old Soldiers players
- Dayton Veterans players
