= Fort Wayne Indians =

- 1897–1900; (1896–1900); Fort Wayne, Indiana

Minor league affiliations
- Class: Class C (1896); Class B (1897–1900)
- League: Interstate League (1896–1900)

Major league affiliations
- Team: None

Minor league titles
- League titles (1): 1900
- Wild card berths (1): 1900

Team data
- Name: Fort Wayne Farmers (1896); Fort Wayne Indians (1897–1900)
- Ballpark: The Grand Dutchess (1896–1900)

The Fort Wayne Indians were a minor league baseball team based in Fort Wayne, Indiana.

From 1896 to 1900, Fort Wayne teams played exclusively as members of the Class C (1896) and Class B (1897–1900) level Interstate League, winning the 1900 league championship. The Fort Wayne team was known as the "Farmers" in 1896. The Indians were immediately succeeded by the 1901 Fort Wayne Railroaders in minor league play.

The Fort Wayne teams hosted Interstate League home minor league baseball games at The Grand Dutchess.

== History ==
=== Interstate League 1896 to 1899 ===
The first professional team in Fort Wayne was the major league level Fort Wayne Kekiongas, who played the 1871 season as members of the National Association.

Minor league baseball began in Fort Wayne in 1883, when the Fort Wayne Hoosiers team played as members of the Independent level Northwestern League. After minor league seasons in various leagues, the 1895 "Fort Wayne" team of the Class B level Western Interstate League preceded the Indians in minor league play.

Fort Wayne continued minor league play in the 1896 Interstate League, beginning a five-year tenure in the Class C and Class B level league.

In 1896, the Fort Wayne "Farmers" began play as members of the Class C level Interstate League. The Jackson Wolverines, New Castle Quakers, Saginaw Lumbermen, Toledo Mud Hens, Washington Little Senators, Wheeling Nailers and Youngstown Puddlers teams joined Fort Wayne in beginning league play on May 2, 1896.

The Fort Wayne franchise was owned by Frank Robison part owner of the Cleveland Spiders, who also was invested in the trolly system in Fort Wayne. Robison had invested $4,000 in the team, hired manager George Tebeau and stocked the Fort Wayne roster with Cleveland prospects. George Tebeau's brother Patsy Tebeau was Cleveland's manager at the time. Robison secured League Park for the team ballpark.

In their first season of play in the new league, the Fort Wayne Farmers ended the season in second place in the eight-team league behind manager George Tebeau. With a final record of 70–36, Fort Wayne ended the season 8.5 games behind the first place Toledo Mud Hens. Second place Fort Wayne and first place Toledo were scheduled for a playoff series, but Fort Wayne disbanded and did not play in the series. Toledo was awarded the series by forfeit.

Despite folding at the end of the previous season, in 1897 Fort Wayne resumed Interstate League play, known as the "Indians." The Interstate was elevated to become a Class B level league. The Indians had a record of 63–59 in the eight-team league to end the season in fourth place, playing under managers Fred Cooke and Eddie O'Meara. Fort Wayne ended the season 18.0 games behind the first place Toledo Mud Hens. The Indians did not qualify for the playoff won by Toledo over the Dayton Old Soldiers. Dummy Kihm of Fort Wayne hit 17 home runs to lead the Interstate League, while teammate Chase Alloway had a 1.00 ERA to lead all league pitchers.

In 1898 Interstate League play, the Fort Wayne Indians placed seventh in the Class B level league, playing the season under managers Fred Cooke, Eddie O'Meara and George Geer. Fort Wayne ended the 1898 season with a record of 71–84, finishing 16.0 games behind the first place Dayton Old Soldiers in the eight-team league.

The 1899 Fort Wayne placed third in the eight-team Interstate League final standings. The Indians ended the season with a final record of 82–58 playing under manager Jack Glasscock. Ford Wayne ended the season 5.0 games behind the first place New Castle Quakers in the Class B level league. No playoffs were held. Pitcher Theodore Guese of Fort Wayne led the Interstate League with a 25–10 record.

=== Interstate League 1900 championship ===
In the 1900 season, the Fort Wayne Indians played their final Interstate League season and won the league championship. With a regular season record of 85–53, the Indians played the season under managers Jack Glasscock, Doggie Miller and Joe Hubbard. The Indians ended the regular season in second-place finishing 7.5 games behind the first place Dayton Veterans. A playoff was held between the top two teams and Fort Wayne won the league championship by defeating Dayton 4 games to 3.

In 1900, Fort Wayne manager Doggie Miller was involved in a major incident with an umpire during and after an early season game. After Miller was ejected from the game, he had an altercation with the umpire after the game and bloodied the umpire's face. Miller was subsequently arrested by police and was fined $100 by the Indians team. Newspaper reports speculated that he might be banned from playing professionally, which didn't occur.

Fort Wayne had three league leaders in 1900. Otto Kreuger scored a league leading 131 runs. Fort Wayne pitcher Cy Swaim won 24 total games to top Interstate League pitchers, while teammate Bumpus Jones had an 11–3 record to lead the league in won-loss percentage.

The Interstate League folded following the 1900 season, and Fort Wayne continued play in 1901 in a new league, known by a new nickname. The Fort Wayne Railroaders continued minor league play in 1901, as the Railroaders became members of the eight-team Class A level Western Association, with Doggie Miller continuing as manager.

Today, Fort Wayne is home to the minor league Fort Wayne TinCaps, who play as a member of the Class A level Midwest League. The franchise began Midwest League play in 1993.

== The ballpark ==
The Fort Wayne Interstate League minor league teams hosted minor league home games at "The Grand Dutchess." The Grand Dutchess was the nickname given to the grandstands at the League Park site in 1871, so named because of their extravagant construction for the era. The site first hosted organized baseball beginning in 1862. Besides League Park, the ballpark site was also known as Calhoun Street Park, Hamilton Park and Headwaters Park. The site was bordered by Lewis Street, South Calhoun Street, South Clinton Streets and Douglas Avenue in Fort Wayne.

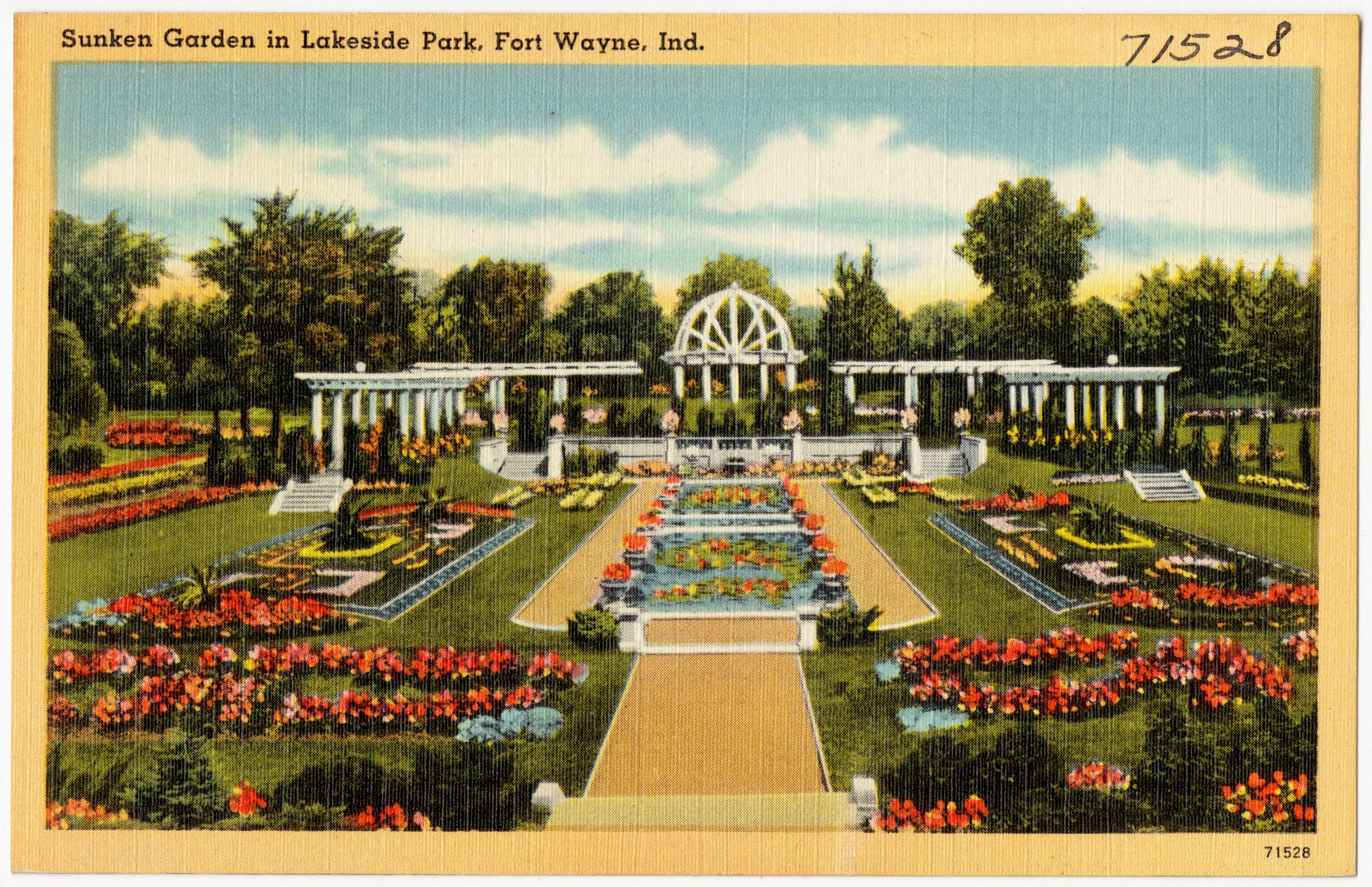
(1930) Lakeside Park. Sunken Garden. Fort Wayne, Indiana.

The original park grandstand was dismantled after the conclusion of the 1884 Northwestern League season. The grandstand was rebuilt in 1890 and remained in use for the 1891 and 1892 minor league seasons. In 1893, the grandstand and fence were moved to Lakeside Park, which was located one mile east of downtown Fort Wayne. The new park was referred to as both Lakeside Park and League Park. The Fort Wayne Indians played Interstate League played at the Lakeside Park location until 1899. The ballpark grandstand was then moved to the original Calhoun Street location, where the League Park grandstand was again rebuilt.

In 1902, League Park hosted two major league games by the Cleveland Bronchos on Sundays to avoid Blue laws in Cleveland. The two games were held on June 22, 1902, against the Washington Senators and August 31. 1902. Cy Young pitched for the Boston Americans in the August 31 contest.

In the era, the Fort Wayne minor league teams shared league Park with the Fort Wayne Colored Giants of the Negro Leagues, who began play in 1907.

Today, there is a baseball historical marker at the League Park site. The League Park site between South Clinton Street and South Calhoun Street is known today as Headwaters Park. Still in use today as a public park with amenities, Headwaters Park is located at 333 South Calhoun Street.

== Timeline ==
Year(s)	# Yrs.	Team	Level	League	Ballpark
1896	1	Fort Wayne Farmers	Class C	Interstate League	League Park
1897–1900	4	Fort Wayne Indians	Class B	Interstate League	League Park

== Year-by-year records ==
Year	Record	Finish	Manager	Playoffs / Notes
1896	70–36	2nd	George Tebeau	Fort Wayne folded on eve on playoff series
1897	63–59	4th	Fred Cooke / Eddie O'Meara	Did not qualify
1898	71–84	7th	Fred Cooke / Eddie O'Meara; George Geer	No playoffs held
1899	82–58	3rd	Jack Glasscock	No playoffs held
1900	85–53	2nd	Jack Glasscock / Joe Hubbard; Doggie Miller	Won league championship Defeated Dayton in final

== Notable alumni ==
- Charlie Babb (1896–1900)
- Ira Belden (1898–1900)
- Bill Bergen (1899–1900)
- Harry Blake (1896)
- Kitty Brashear (1899–1900)
- Hercules Burnett (1898)
- Bill Carrick (1896)
- Fred Cooke (1897–1898, MGR)
- Lou Criger (1896)
- George Darby (1897)
- Lee DeMontreville (1898)
- Jack Doscher (1900)
- Tim Flood (1898–1899)
- Dale Gear (1897)
- Sam Gillen (1890)
- Jack Glasscock (1899–1900, MGR)
- Reddy Grey (1896)
- Whitey Guese (1899)
- George Huff (1898)
- Jack Harper (1900)
- Frank Hemphill (1900)
- Tom Hughes (1898)
- Bumpus Jones (1900)
- George Kelb (1899)
- Red Kleinow (1900)
- Phil Knell (1896)
- Otto Kreuger (1900)
- Bill Kuehne (1899)
- Tom Letcher (1899–1900)
- Ed Lytle (1899)
- Eddie O'Meara (1896; 1897–1898, MGR)
- Doggie Miller (1899; 1900, MGR)
- Jack Morrissey (1897)
- Jay Parker (1897)
- Jack Powell (1896)
- Joe Rickert (1896)
- Cy Swaim (1896, 1899–1900)
- George Tebeau (1896)

== See also ==
- Fort Wayne Farmers players
- Fort Wayne Indians players
- List of professional baseball teams based in Fort Wayne, Indiana
