= Iron and Oil League =

Minor baseball league

- Classification: Independent (1895, 1898)
- Sport: Minor League Baseball
- First season: 1895
- Folded: 1898
- President: Charles B. Powers (1895)
- No. of teams: 13
- Country: United States of America
- Most titles: 1 Franklin Braves (1895); Bradford (1898)
- Related competitions: Iron & Oil Association (1884)

The Iron and Oil League was a minor league baseball league that played in the 1895 and 1898 seasons. League teams were based in Ohio, Pennsylvania, New York and West Virginia.

== History ==
The Iron and Oil League was a minor league formed in the 1890s and existing from time to time in the 1890s and 1900s. In 1898 one of the teams was a black team, the Celeron Acme Colored Giants.

It is sometimes abbreviated as IOL.

Honus Wagner and his brother Butts Wagner played in the league in 1895. Among other major leaguers, Jack Glasscock and Buck Weaver also played in the league.

== Cities represented ==
- Bradford, PA: Bradford Pirates 1898
- Celoron, NY: Celeron 1895; Celoron Acme Colored Giants 1898
- Dunkirk, NY & Fredonia, NY: Dunkirk-Fredonia 1898
- Franklin, PA: Franklin Braves 1895
- Meadville, PA: Meadville 1898
- New Castle, PA: New Castle Quakers 1895
- Oil City, PA: Oil City Oilers 1895, 1898
- Olean, NY: Olean 1898
- Sharon, PA: Sharon 1895
- Titusville, PA: Titusville 1895
- Dennison, OH & Uhrichsville, OH: Twin Cities Twins 1895
- Warren, PA: Warren 1895, 1898
- Wheeling, WV: Wheeling Nailers 1895

== Standings and statistics ==
=== 1895 Iron And Oil League ===
schedule

Team standings	W	L	PCT	GB	Managers
Franklin Braves	44	32	.579	--	Frank Boyd
Oil City Oilers	42	31	.575	0.5	Guy Hecker
Warren	43	32	.573	0.5	George England
New Castle Quakers	40	33	.548	2.5	Will Thompson
Titusville	33	40	.452	9.5	Harry Smith
Sharon / Celeron	23	49	.319	19.0	Walter Herrington
Wheeling Nailers	19	13	.594	NA	William White / Al Buckenberger/Jack Glasscock
Twin Cities Twins	7	21	.250	NA	Jack Darrah

Wheeling and Twin Cities entered the league July 16 for the second half.
Sharon (16–29) moved to Celeron July 16 for the second half.

Player statistics
Player	Team	Stat	Tot
Toots Barrett	Warren	W	12
John Easton	Oil City	PCT	.889 8–1

=== 1898 Iron And Oil League ===
Team standings	W	L	PCT	GB	Managers
Bradford	38	14	.731	--	William Stuart
Warren	34	17	.667	3.5	James Brady
Olean	31	24	.564	8.5	P.J. Joyce / Pop Hunter
Meadville	23	29	.442	15.0	NA
Oil City Oilers / Dunkirk–Fredonia	22	30	.423	16.0	Guy Hecker
Celeron Acme Colored Giants	8	42	.160	29.0	Harry Curtis / C.W. Toboldt

Oil City (17–13) transferred to Dunkirk–Fredonia June 18
The Black Clereon team disbanded July 5 and was replaced with a white team
Olean disbanded July 14, causing the league to disband.
