= Henry Youngman =

Henry Youngman may refer to:

- Henny Youngman (1906–1998), American comedian and violinist
- Henry Youngman (baseball) (1865–1936), played for the Pittsburgh Allegheneys in 1890
- Henry Youngman (minister) (1849–1927), Australian Methodist minister, president-general of the Methodist Church of Australasia 1910–1913
- Henry Youngman (rugby) (born ca. 1988), New Zealand Rugby Union player for SC 1880 Frankfurt
