= Bill Armour =

American baseball player and manager

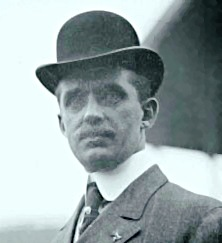
- Armour as Detroit manager, 1905
- Outfielder / Manager
- Born: September 3, 1869; Homestead, Pennsylvania, U.S.
- Died: December 2, 1922 (aged 53); Minneapolis, Minnesota, U.S.
- Batted: Unknown Threw: Unknown
- Stats at Baseball Reference

Teams
- As player: Bradford (1891); Oshkosh (1891); Toledo Black Pirates (1892); Kansas City Blues (1893); Paterson (1895); Montgomery Grays (1896); As manager: Dayton Old Soldiers/Veterans (1897–1901); Cleveland Bronchos/Naps (1902–1904); Detroit Tigers (1905–1906); As president: Toledo Mud Hens (1907–1911)

William Reginald Armour (September 3, 1869 – December 2, 1922) was an American professional baseball player and manager. He was the manager of the Cleveland Bronchos in 1902 when they signed Nap Lajoie to the most lucrative contract in baseball history and the manager of the Detroit Tigers when they acquired Ty Cobb in 1905.

Armour played professional baseball from 1891 to 1896 as a center fielder and right fielder for several minor teams. He earned a reputation for his fielding abilities. He also had excellent speed and stole 43 bases in 69 games in 1891 and 52 bases in 126 games in 1896. Armour began his managerial career with the Dayton, Ohio baseball club, of which he was also the principal owner. He managed the Dayton club from 1897 to 1901.

From 1902 to 1904, he was the manager of the Cleveland Bronchos/Naps. Armour took over a Cleveland team with a losing record, and during his three years there, the team's record improved each year, reaching 86-65 in 1904. From 1905 to 1906, he was the manager of the Detroit Tigers. In his first year in Detroit, the team improved by 17 games over the prior year. With the signing of Ty Cobb, the Tigers set the table for three consecutive American League pennants that followed from 1907 to 1909. From 1907 to 1911, Armour served as the president and co-owner of the Toledo Mud Hens. He served as a scout for the St. Louis Cardinals in 1912 and next became business manager of the Milwaukee baseball club. He subsequently opened a restaurant in Minneapolis where he died in 1922 at age 53.

== Early years ==
Armour was born in Homestead, Pennsylvania in 1869.

== Baseball player ==
Armour played professional baseball for several years before he began his career as a manager. In 1891, at age 21, he appeared in 69 games, principally as a right fielder, for the Bradford, Pennsylvania club in the New York–Pennsylvania League. By May 1891, Armour was drawing for his fielding ability. The manager of the Meadville team wrote to the Sporting Life that his team might have one at least one game against Bradford "had not that great fielder, Armour, been playing. In the tenth inning of the first game, with one out and Lyons on second, he caught a line hit foul on which he doubled up Lyons and put an end to what, at that stage of the game, looked like a Meadville victory. It was the finest catch on the grounds this season." Armour compiled a .269 batting average and stole 43 bases for Bradford.

At the end of August 1891, Armour signed with Oshkosh in the Wisconsin State League and played the remainder of the season there. In 1892, Armour appeared in 52 games, principally in right field, for the Toledo Black Pirates of the Western League. His batting average dropped by 124 points to .144 over his performance the prior year with Bradford.

In 1893, Armour played for the Kansas City Blues in the Western Association and saw his batting average jump to .280 with 22 runs scored and 14 stolen bases in only 20 games. Armour also returned to Bradford in 1893 to play in 20 games, including the game that won the Monongahela League pennant for Braddock. The use of Armour, a Western Association player, in the game prompted a protest by the Duquesne club that Braddock's pennant be forfeited. The pennant was ultimately awarded to Braddock.

Armour signed to play with Buffalo in January 1894, but was badly injured in a coasting accident at his hometown of Homestead in February 1894. Initial reports indicated that physicians did not believe Armour could recover. The following month, Armour was recuperating, and a Buffalo correspondent wrote to the Sporting Life expressing hope for his recovery, as "Armour is highly thought of as a fielder and is expected to greatly strengthen our out field." In mid-April 1894, Armour announced that the injury, which had nearly broken his back, would prevent him from playing baseball for six weeks to two months. Official records reflect Armour playing only three games in 1894. After being released by Buffalo, he played in one game each for three Pennsylvania State League teams -- Easton, Scranton, and Altoona.

By 1895, Armour was fully recovered from his injuries. He began the season as the center fielder for the Montgomery Grays of the Southern Association. In March 1885, a Montgomery correspondent wrote to the Sporting Life on Armour's progress: "Your correspondent was out to the park seeing the boys limber up this afternoon, and they are certainly all right. Armour is a race horse in the field, and there is no fear but what centre will be taken care of in A No. 1 style." In June 1895, the Sporting Life reported: "Armour can get to first quicker than any player in the South." In July, the Sporting Life reported that Armour "made two phenomenal running in catches of line hits over the infield which robbed [the opposing team] of two 'sure' safe hits."

In 1896, Armour played center field for the Paterson Silk Weavers in the Atlantic League. He compiled a .268 batting average at Paterson with 115 runs scored, 52 stolen bases and 24 extra base hits in 126 games. He also continued to play well in the outfield, with a Paterson correspondent writing to the Sporting Life in late June that Armour was "head and shoulders" above anything previously seen in center field and that he was playing his position in a manner that has brought forth the greatest praise from the patrons of the game."

== Baseball manager ==
=== Dayton ===
In 1897, Armour began his managerial career at age 27 as player-manager for the Dayton Old Soldiers in the Interstate League. He also became the principal owner of the Dayton baseball club. In mid-August 1897, Armour had led Dayton to 14 wins in 17 games, and the Dayton correspondent to the Sporting Life wrote that it was "one of the best teams that ever represented Dayton" and that Armour was "getting very good work out of the boys, who are all satisfied with his management."

Armour continued to manage the Dayton club, renamed the Veterans in 1899 and 1900, for five years from 1897 to 1901.

=== Cleveland Bronchos/Naps ===
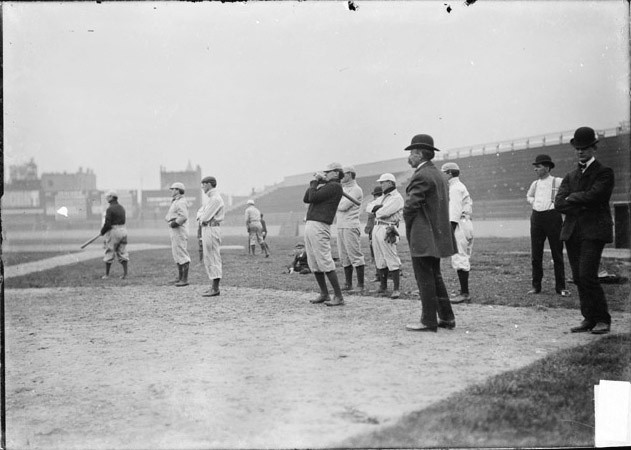
Cleveland Bronchos warming up in Chicago (Armour in suit at right).

In 1902, Armour was hired as the manager of the Cleveland Bronchos in the American League. The team had finished the 1901 season in seventh place with a 54-82 record. In the team's first season under Armour, the team opened the season by losing 24 of its first 35 games. However, the team gained momentum and compiled a 69-67 record—a 15-game improvement over the prior year's finish.

On May 31, 1902, during Armour's first season at Cleveland, the club signed future Baseball Hall of Fame inductee Nap Lajoie as a free agent; Lajoie compiled a .379 batting average for Cleveland in 1902. Armour announced that Lajoie would be paid the largest salary ever paid to a baseball player: "For his services with our club he will receive $28,000 for four years, every cent of which he will he paid, play or not, as the courts may direct. This is the largest salary ever paid a base ball player, and beats by $3000 the figure paid by Boston several years for pitcher Clarkson." Armour also engineered the mid-season acquisition of pitcher Bill Bernhard, who Armour called "the best pitcher in present day baseball." Bernhard ended up with a 17-5 record for Cleveland in 1902 (and a 23-13 record in 1904).

In Armour's second year in Cleveland, the team continued to improve, finishing in third place with a 77-63 record. Lajoie won the American League batting crown with a .344 average.

In Armour's third year in Cleveland, the team again improved, compiling an 86-65 record as Lajoie won his second consecutive American League batting crown.

Despite the steady improvement each year during Armour's tenure with Cleveland, friction had developed between Armour and the team's star and captain, Nap Lajoie. By the last half of the 1904 season, the two were reportedly "not on speaking terms." On September 8, 1904, Armour announced his resignation as manager of the Cleveland club, effective at the end of the season. The Cleveland Plain Dealer praised Armour's efforts in that city: "No better judge of a ball player's ability than Bill Armour lives, and not a small point necessary to win games escapes him. But the ability of the players to carry out his plans has, oftimes, been lacking."

=== Detroit Tigers ===
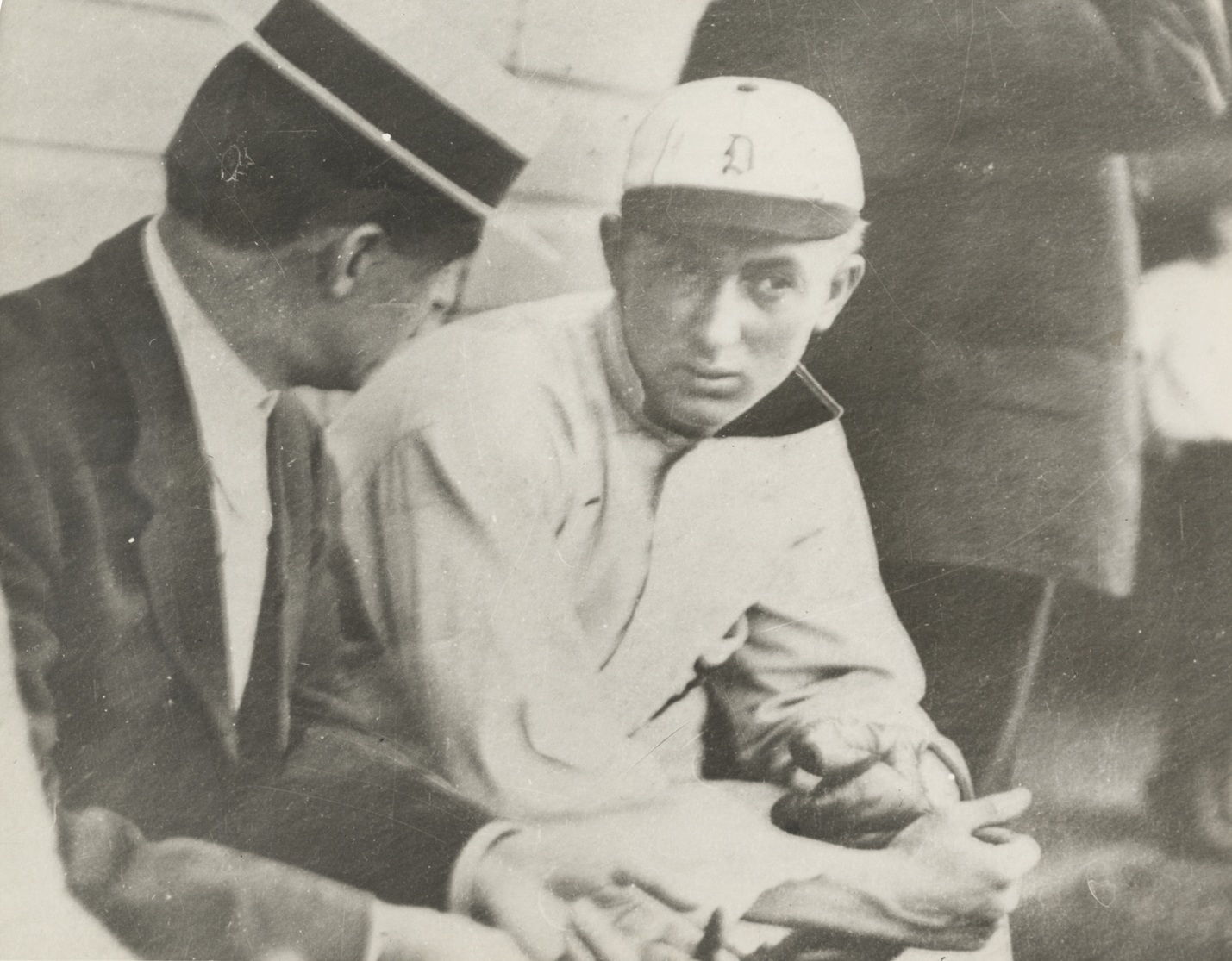
Bill Armour with Ty Cobb on the 1st day Cobb played at Detroit

In late September 1904, Armour was hired as the manager of the Detroit Tigers for the 1905 season. In October 1904, he rented a suite at the Pasadena Apartments in on Detroit's Jefferson Avenue.

Accordubg to Bill James' "Historical Baseball Abstract" Armour quite likely was the inventor of platooning while with Detroit in his use of catcher Boss Schmidt.

In 1905, Armour led the Tigers to third place in the American League with a 79-74 record. The finish represented a 17-game improvement over the prior year's seventh-place finish and 62-90 record. Armour's greatest contribution during the 1905 season was the discovery and signing of Ty Cobb. Armour paid the Augusta club for Cobb's early release, and Cobb joined the Tigers in August 1905. Cobb later wrote:

"To Manager Armour, my first big league boss, I cannot give too much thanks for his kindly action and his personal attention to me, my work and my welfare. He is an ideal man for any young baseball player to 'break in' under. He seems to feel just how a recruit feels when he is starting his Major League career, and his record of developing young diamond pastimers will bear me out."

By the start of the 1906 season, relations between Armour and team owner Frank Navin were strained. In early May 1906, Armour tendered his resignation, but later reconsidered.

The 1906 Tigers were also plagued by numerous injuries, including the loss of second baseman Germany Schaefer, and the team's record slid in 1906 to 71-78. On September 17, 1906, Armour announced he would not be returning to Detroit in 1907 and that he would be succeeded by Hughie Jennings. Paul H. Bruske in Sporting Life wrote that "wherever William Armour goes he will always make firm friends and, had his hands been left free in Detroit, his team would undoubtedly have worked much better, for that is the sort of a man Armour is — to put ginger and steam into all that he does."

On September 25, 1906, Armour was assaulted with blows to the face by Washington catcher Jack Warner under the grandstand in Detroit after a game between Detroit and Washington. Warner had played for the Tigers in 1905 and 1906 but was sold to Washington in August 1906. Warner stated that Armour had "branded him falsely as a disturber," and Armour blamed the failure of the 1906 Detroit team to Warner. After the season ended, team owner Frank Navin alleged that Armour had been "too lenient with the players."

=== Toledo Mud Hens ===
In November 1906, Armour purchased the Toledo Mud Hens and became the club's president. He also served as the team's manager in 1907 and 1908. The club was a financial success in the first three years under Armour. However, attendance declined after Swayne field was sold, and the team was required to play its games at a less convenient location during the 1910 and 1911 seasons. In November 1911, Armour resigned as the club's president, citing the inability to turn the club into a profitable enterprise. Armour also sold his one-third interest in the club at that time.

=== St. Louis, Milwaukee and Kansas City ===
In November 1911, Armour purchased the Lancaster club in the Ohio State League and took over as the team's manager. However, Armour opted not to manager the Lancaster team and instead accepted a position as a scout for the St. Louis Cardinals during the 1912 season. In an interview with the Detroit Free Press, Armour explained his rationale for giving up managing:

"I really believe that I would have been a dead man now had I tried to keep up managing a ball club. I proved one of the hardest losers in the game . . . I couldn't forget after the game what had happened during the battle. I worried so much that I couldn't eat. The result was that I found myself moping about during the evening, apparently sore at myself, the world and everything else and then decided that if I wanted to have any pleasure in life I would have to give up trying to manage a ball club."

After his time in St. Louis, Armour served as business manager for the Milwaukee baseball club in 1913 and manager of the Kansas City club in 1914.

=== Managerial Record ===
Team	Year	Regular season					Postseason			
Team	Year	Games	Won	Lost	Win %	Finish	Won	Lost	Win %	Result
CLE	1902	136	69	67	.507	5th in AL	–	–	–	
CLE	1903	140	77	63	.550	3rd in AL	–	–	–	
CLE	1904	151	86	65	.570	4th in AL	–	–	–	
CLE total		437	232	195	.543		0	0	–	
DET	1905	153	79	74	.516	3rd in AL	–	–	–	
DET	1906	149	71	78	.477	6th in AL	–	–	–	
DET total		302	150	152	.497		0	0	–	
Total		729	382	347	.524		0	0	–	

== Family and later years ==
On March 27, 1901, Armour was married to Ida Fulton at the home of the bride's parents in Homestead, Pennsylvania. In his later years, Armour was engaged in the restaurant business in Minneapolis, Minnesota. In December 1922, he died suddenly in Minneapolis from "a stroke of apoplexy" at age 53.
