= Ed Lytle =

American baseball player (1862-1950)

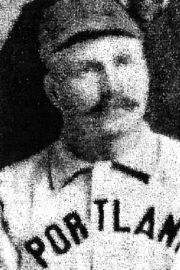
- Second baseman / Outfielder / Manager
- Born: March 10, 1862; Racine, Wisconsin, U.S.
- Died: December 21, 1950 (aged 88); Long Beach, California, U.S.
- Batted: Right Threw: Right

MLB debut
- August 11, 1890, for the Chicago Colts

Last MLB appearance
- August 28, 1890, for the Pittsburgh Alleghenys

MLB statistics
- Batting average: .136
- Hits: 8
- Runs: 3
- Stats at Baseball Reference

Teams
- Chicago Colts (1890); Pittsburgh Alleghenys (1890)

Edward Benson Lytle (March 10, 1862 – December 21, 1950), also known as "Dad" Lytle and "Pop" Lytle, was an American professional baseball player and manager whose playing career spanned 12 seasons, including one in Major League Baseball with the Chicago Colts and the Pittsburgh Alleghenys in 1890. Over his major league career, Lytle, a second baseman and outfielder, batted .136 with three runs, eight hits and one doubles in 16 games played. He also played in the minor leagues with Colorado Springs, the Wheeling National Citys/Nailers, the Portland Gladiators, the Class-B Los Angeles Seraphs, the Class-A Kansas City Cowboys, the Los Angeles Angels, the Binghamton Bingoes, the Allentown Buffaloes, the Class-A Wilkes-Barre Coal Barons, the Class-B Hartford Bluebirds, the Class-A Rochester Brownies, the Class-A Montreal Royals, the Class-B New Castle Quakers, the Class-B Wheeling Nailers, the Class-A Milwaukee Brewers, the Class-B Fort Wayne Indians and the Class-B Wheeling Stogies. Lytle also managed in the minor leagues with the New Castle Quakers in 1899 and the Wheeling Stogies from 1899 to 1900.

== Professional career ==
Lytle began his professional baseball in 1889 with the minor league Colorado Springs baseball team of the Colorado State League. During the 1890 season, Lytle played in Major League Baseball with the Chicago Colts and the Pittsburgh Alleghenys. His major league debut was on August 11, 1890. In that game, Lytle played left field and would throw the ball to second base after he caught it, no matter the situation. As a member of the Colts, Lytle played in one game, getting no hits in four at-bats. He then joined the Pittsburgh Alleghenys, who were also a major league team, and batted .145 with two runs, eight hits, one doubles and eight walks in 15 games played. Lytle also played in the minors that season with the Wheeling National Citys/Nailers of the Tri-State League. During the 1891 season, he joined the minor league Portland Gladiators of the Pacific Northwest League. Lytle played for two teams in the 1892 season, the Class-B Los Angeles Seraphs of the California League and the Class-A Kansas City Cowboys of the Western League. In 1893, he spent the entire season with the Los Angeles California League team, now renamed the "Angels". In 1894, Lytle spent the season with the Binghamton Bingoes, who were later relocated to Allentown, Pennsylvania, and renamed the Allentown Buffaloes. That year, he also played with the Wilkes-Barre Coal Barons, whom he would play with until 1896. During the 1895 season, Lytle batted .336 with 112 runs, 161 hits, 25 doubles, 12 triples, two home run and eight stolen bases in 476 at-bats with the Wilkes-Barre Coal Barons. That year, Lytle was sixth in the Eastern League in runs and ninth in hits.

During the 1897 season, Lytle played for the Class-B Hartford Bluebirds, the Class-A Rochester Brownies, the Class-A Montreal Royals, the Class-B New Castle Quakers, the Class-B Wheeling Nailers and the Class-A Milwaukee Brewers. Statistics were only kept for his stints at Hartford and Milwaukee. With the Bluebirds, Lytle batted .143 with five runs, six hits, two doubles, one home run and one stolen base in 10 games played. With the Brewers, he got one hit in four at-bats. During the 1898 season, he was the player-manager for the Class-B New Castle Quakers of the Interstate League. In 1899, he began the season with the Wheeling Stogies after being traded with George Kihm by their previous team, the New Castle Quakers, in exchange for John Farrell and William Graffius. He also played for the Class-B Fort Wayne Indians in 1899. From 1899 to 1900, Lytle played and managed the Wheeling Stogies.

== Personal life ==
Lytle was born on March 10, 1862, in Racine, Wisconsin. He died on December 21, 1950, in Long Beach, California, and was buried in Sunnyside Memorial Park in that city.
