= Acme Giants =

American baseball team

The Acme Giants were a baseball team that played in the Iron and Oil League. They were founded by businessman Harry Curtis in 1898 in Celoron, New York, in the southwestern part of the state. The team's initial incarnation was as the Acme Colored Giants, a team consisting solely of black players. This made them unique in their league, which otherwise consisted of all white teams. Curtis boasted that "we will have the strongest colored team in America" when he started the team. After the team won only 8 of their first 49 games, however, Curtis disbanded the team. This new team, the Acme Giants, with the word "Colored" removed, consisted of only white players.
