= Jack Compton (baseball) =

American baseball player (1882–1974)

- Pitcher
- Born: March 9, 1882; Lancaster, Ohio, U.S.
- Died: July 4, 1974 (aged 92); Lancaster, Ohio, U.S.
- Batted: Right Threw: Right

MLB debut
- September 7, 1911, for the Cincinnati Reds

Last MLB appearance
- September 30, 1911, for the Cincinnati Reds

MLB statistics
- Win–loss record: 0–1
- Strikeouts: 6
- Earned run average: 3.91
- Stats at Baseball Reference

Teams
- Cincinnati Reds (1911)

Harry Leroy Compton (March 9, 1882 – July 4, 1974) was an American Major League Baseball pitcher. He played for the Cincinnati Reds in 1911. He later managed the Dayton Veterans in 1915.
