= Fred Cooke (baseball) =

American baseball player (1873–1923)

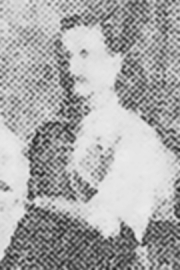
- Outfielder
- Born: October 1873; Illinois, U.S.
- Died: January 22, 1923 (aged 49–50); Gallipolis, Ohio, U.S.
- Batted: Unknown Threw: Unknown

MLB debut
- July 30, 1897, for the Cleveland Spiders

Last MLB appearance
- August 3, 1897, for the Cleveland Spiders

MLB statistics
- Batting average: .294
- Home runs: 0
- Runs batted in: 3
- Stats at Baseball Reference

Teams
- Cleveland Spiders (1897)

Frederick B. Cooke (October 1873 – January 22, 1923) was an American outfielder in Major League Baseball who played in the late 19th century. He managed the Fort Wayne Indians of the Interstate League in 1897.
