= Will Thompson (baseball) =

American baseball player (1870–1962)

- Pitcher
- Born: August 30, 1870; Pittsburgh, Pennsylvania, U.S.
- Died: June 9, 1962 (aged 91); Pittsburgh, Pennsylvania, U.S.
- Batted: Right Threw: Right

MLB debut
- July 9, 1892, for the Pittsburgh Pirates

Last MLB appearance
- July 9, 1892, for the Pittsburgh Pirates

MLB statistics
- Win–loss record: 0–1
- Earned run average: 3.00
- Strikeouts: 0
- Stats at Baseball Reference

Teams
- Pittsburgh Pirates (1892)

Will McLain Thompson (August 30, 1870 – June 9, 1962) was an American professional baseball player who played pitcher in the Major Leagues for the 1892 Pittsburgh Pirates of the National League. He played college ball at the University of Pennsylvania. He also played in the New York State League in 1889, the Pennsylvania State League in 1893 and the Iron and Oil League in 1895. He later served in the Spanish–American War.
