= Iron & Oil Association =

Minor League Baseball league

- Classification: Independent (1884)
- Sport: Minor League Baseball
- First season: 1884
- Folded: 1884
- President: Horace G. Miller (1884)
- No. of teams: 8
- Country: United States of America
- Most titles: 1 Franklin (1884)

The Iron & Oil Association was a six–team Minor League Baseball league that operated in 1884. The league franchises were based in Ohio and Pennsylvania. The league folded following the 1884 season.

== Cities represented ==
- East Liberty, OH: East Liberty Stars 1884
- Franklin, PA: Franklin Braves 1884
- Johnstown, PA: Johnstown 1884
- New Brighton, PA: New Brighton 1884
- New Castle, PA: New Castle Nashannocks 1884
- Oil City, PA: Oil City Oilers 1884
- Youngstown, OH: Youngstown 1884

== 1884 Iron & Oil Association ==
Team standings	W	L	PCT	GB	Managers
Franklin Braves	31	8	.795	–	W.E. Baker
New Brighton / Johnstown	19	16	.543	10	William Boyle / W.C. Blogg
New Castle Nashannocks	20	24	.455	13½	Levi Dunham / William Ellis
Youngstown	18	23	.439	14	Thomas Dorsey / T.P. Brownlee
East Liberty Stars	10	27	.270	20	William Deems
Oil City Oilers	18	18	.500	NA	Norman Baker / George Balsley

New Brighton disbanded August 1 and was replaced by Johnstown.
Oil City disbanded August 4.

== Sources ==
- Baseball Reference
