= Frank Figgemeier =

American baseball player (1873–1915)

- Pitcher
- Born: April 22, 1873; St. Louis, Missouri, US
- Died: April 15, 1915 (aged 41); St. Louis, Missouri, US
- Batted: Unknown Threw: Unknown

MLB debut
- September 25, 1894, for the Philadelphia Phillies

Last MLB appearance
- September 25, 1894, for the Philadelphia Phillies

MLB statistics
- Win–loss record: 0–1
- Strikeouts: 2
- Earned run average: 11.25
- Stats at Baseball Reference

Teams
- Philadelphia Phillies (1894)

Frank Y. Figgemeier (April 22, 1873 – April 15, 1915) was an American pitcher in Major League Baseball who played for the 1894 Philadelphia Phillies of the National League. He pitched in one game for the Phillies, a complete game start on September 25, 1894, where he allowed 10 earned runs and picked up the loss. He later played in the Western Association (1894–1896), Western League (1894, 1896–1898), Interstate League (1899–1900), Illinois–Indiana–Iowa League (1901), Western League (1901) and American Association (1902).

Figgemeier died in 1915 in his home town of St. Louis, Missouri due to his chronic alcoholism.
