= Paul Russell (baseball) =

American baseball player (1871–1957)

- Outfielder/Second baseman/Third baseman
- Born: March 23, 1871; Reading, Pennsylvania, U.S.
- Died: October 8, 1957 (aged 86); Norristown, Pennsylvania, U.S.
- Batted: Unknown Threw: Unknown

MLB debut
- July 29, 1894, for the St. Louis Browns

Last MLB appearance
- August 4, 1894, for the St. Louis Browns

MLB statistics
- Games played: 3
- At bats: 10
- Hits: 1
- Stats at Baseball Reference

Teams
- St. Louis Browns (1894)

Paul A. Russell (born Benjamin Paul Sheeder; March 23, 1871 – October 8, 1957) was an American outfielder and infielder in Major League Baseball. He played for the St. Louis Browns in 1894. After his brief MLB appearance he played in the minors from 1896 to 1900 in the Central Pennsylvania League, Interstate League, New England League and Atlantic League. He was also a player/manager in the Interstate League in 1897 and 1898.
