= Pat Wright (baseball) =

American baseball player (1868–1943)

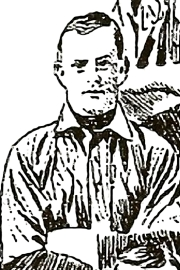
- Second baseman
- Born: July 5, 1868; Pottsville, Pennsylvania, U.S.
- Died: May 29, 1943 (aged 74); Springfield, Illinois, U.S.
- Batted: Switch Threw: Right

MLB debut
- July 11, 1890, for the Chicago Colts

Last MLB appearance
- July 11, 1890, for the Chicago Colts

MLB statistics
- Batting average: .000
- At bats: 2
- Walks: 1
- Stats at Baseball Reference

Teams
- Chicago Colts (1890)

Patrick W. Wright (July 5, 1868 – May 29, 1943) was an American professional baseball player. He played in one game in Major League Baseball for the Chicago Colts of the National League on July 11, 1890 as a second baseman.

Wright had an extensive career in minor league baseball. He played on and off for over twenty years, from 1888 until 1909. He also served as player-manager for several teams between 1894 and 1901.
