= John Thornton (baseball) =

American baseball player (1869–1935)

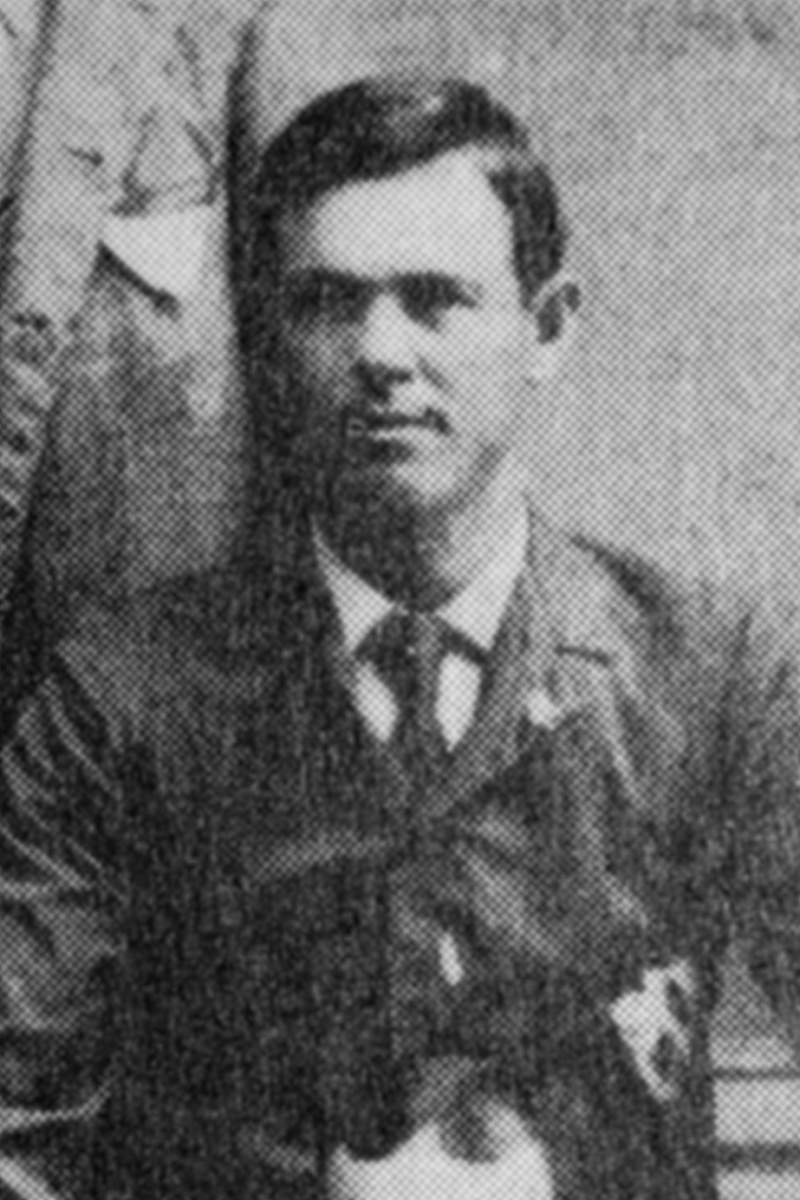
- Pitcher
- Born: May 22, 1869; Washington, D.C., U.S.
- Died: April 26, 1935 (aged 65); Washington, D.C., U.S.
- Batted: Left Threw: Right

MLB debut
- August 14, 1889, for the Washington Nationals

Last MLB appearance
- September 15, 1892, for the St. Louis Browns

MLB statistics
- Win–loss record: 15–19
- Earned run average: 4.10
- Strikeouts: 57
- Stats at Baseball Reference

Teams
- Washington Nationals (1889); Philadelphia Phillies (1891–1892); St. Louis Browns (1892)

John James Thornton (May 22, 1869 – April 26, 1935) was an American Major League Baseball pitcher for the Washington Nationals (1889) and Philadelphia Phillies (1891–1892). He also played outfield for the St. Louis Browns (1892). He continued to play in the minor leagues through 1899. He managed in the minors in 1906.
