= Tom O'Meara =

American baseball player (1872–1902)

- Catcher
- Born: December 12, 1872; Chicago, Illinois
- Died: February 16, 1902 (aged 29); Fort Wayne, Indiana
- Batted: Right Threw: Unknown

MLB debut
- September 29, 1895, for the Cleveland Spiders

Last MLB appearance
- July 22, 1896, for the Cleveland Spiders

MLB statistics
- Games played: 13
- Batting average: .147
- Runs batted in: 0
- Stats at Baseball Reference

Teams
- Cleveland Spiders (1895–1896)

Thomas Edward O'Meara (December 12, 1872 – February 16, 1902) was a catcher in Major League Baseball. He played for the Cleveland Spiders in 1895 and 1896.
