= Celoron, New York =

Village in New York, US

- Village
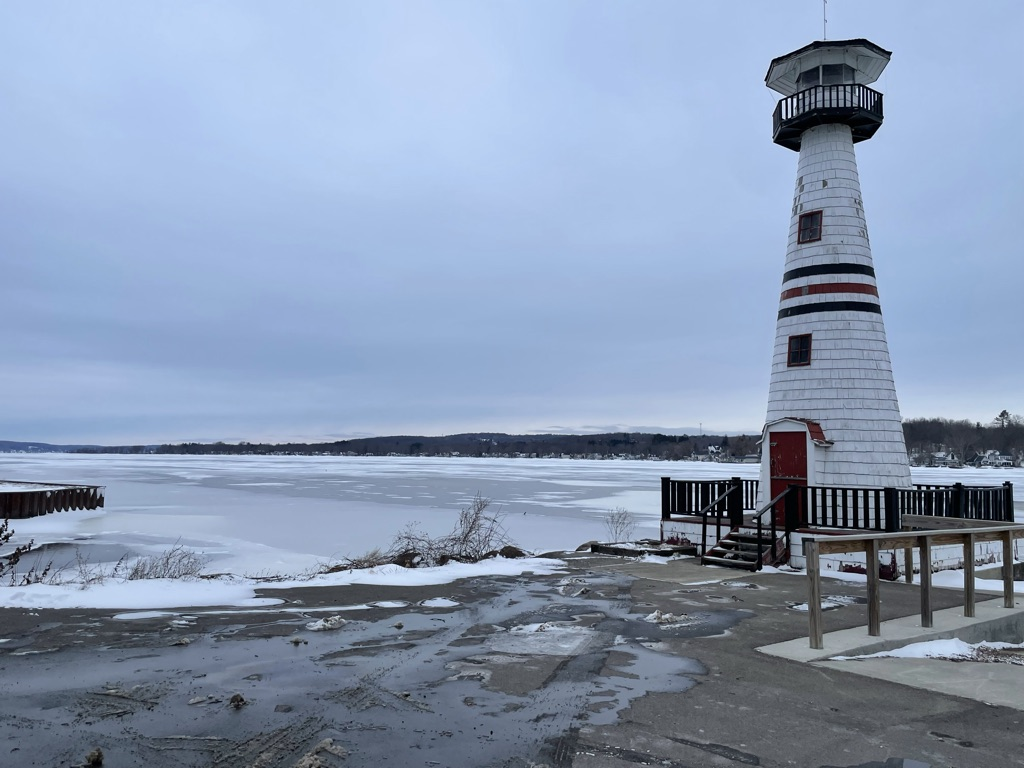
- Celoron Lighthouse on Chautauqua Lake

- Location within New York Location within the United States
- Coordinates: 42°6′24″N 79°16′53″W
- Country: United States
- State: New York
- County: Chautauqua
- Town: Ellicott

Area
  - Total: 0.75 sq mi (1.94 km^{2})
  - Land: 0.75 sq mi (1.94 km^{2})
  - Water: 0 sq mi (0.00 km^{2})
- Elevation: 1,319 ft (402 m)

Population (2020)
  - Total: 1,069
  - Density: 1,429.8/sq mi (552.05/km^{2})
- Time zone: UTC-5 (Eastern (EST))
  - Summer (DST): UTC-4 (EDT)
- ZIP Codes: 14720 (Celoron); 14701 (Jamestown)
- Area code: 716
- FIPS code: 36-13288
- GNIS feature ID: 0946168
- Website: celoronny.org

Celoron (/ˈsɛlərɒn/ SEL-ər-on) is a village in Chautauqua County, New York, United States. It is part of the town of Ellicott and sits on the west boundary of the city of Jamestown. The population of Celoron was 1,082 at the 2020 census.

== History ==
Celoron Park was an amusement park, built by the Broadhead family in either 1893 or 1894, prior to the formation of the village. Celoron Park was designed with inspiration from the amusement parks at Coney Island and Atlantic City. Celoron Park closed in 1962.

The village of Celoron was incorporated in 1896. The name of the village comes from that of French officer and explorer of Ohio Pierre Joseph Céloron de Blainville.

Beginning in 1898, it was the home of the Acme Giants baseball team.

== Geography ==
Celoron is located in the western part of the town of Ellicott at 42°6′24″N 79°16′53″W (42.106778, -79.281414), on the south shore of Chautauqua Lake. It is bordered to the east by the city of Jamestown and to the south and west by unincorporated parts of the town of Ellicott (designated Jamestown West by the Census Bureau).

According to the United States Census Bureau, the village has a total area of 1.9 square kilometres (0.73 sq mi), all land.

== Demographics ==
Historical population
Census	Pop.	Note	%±
1900	506		—
1910	619		22.3%
1920	757		22.3%
1930	1,182		56.1%
1940	1,349		14.1%
1950	1,555		15.3%
1960	1,507		−3.1%
1970	1,456		−3.4%
1980	1,405		−3.5%
1990	1,232		−12.3%
2000	1,295		5.1%
2010	1,112		−14.1%
2020	1,069		−3.9%
2021 (est.)	1,073	▲	0.4%
U.S. Decennial Census

As of the census of 2000, there were 1,295 people, 526 households, and 357 families residing in the village. The population density was 1,741.0 inhabitants per square mile (672.2/km^{2}). There were 567 housing units at an average density of 762.3 per square mile (294.3/km^{2}). The racial makeup of the village was 94.90% White, 0.77% African American, 0.46% Native American, 1.54% Asian, 0.54% from other races, and 1.78% from two or more races. Hispanic or Latino of any race were 2.16% of the population.

There were 526 households, out of which 30.4% had children under the age of 18 living with them, 50.0% were married couples living together, 11.8% had a female householder with no husband present, and 32.1% were non-families. 26.8% of all households were made up of individuals, and 11.2% had someone living alone who was 65 years of age or older. The average household size was 2.39 and the average family size was 2.83.

In the village, the population was spread out, with 23.8% under the age of 18, 7.3% from 18 to 24, 28.9% from 25 to 44, 25.7% from 45 to 64, and 14.3% who were 65 years of age or older. The median age was 38 years. For every 100 females, there were 95.9 males. For every 100 females age 18 and over, there were 93.5 males.

The median income for a household in the village was $31,544, and the median income for a family was $33,333. Males had a median income of $30,980 versus $21,719 for females. The per capita income for the village was $15,098. About 8.9% of families and 13.2% of the population were below the poverty line, including 13.6% of those under age 18 and 5.4% of those age 65 or over.

== Notable person ==
- Lucille Ball (1911–1989), American actress, lived in Celoron during her teenage years in the home at 59 W. 8th Street, now called 59 Lucy Lane. There is a Lucille Ball-Desi Arnaz Center in nearby Jamestown. The village received international attention for its statue of Lucille Ball.
