= Bill Richardson (baseball) =

American baseball player (1878–1949)

- First baseman
- Born: January 24, 1878; Salem, Indiana, U.S.
- Died: November 6, 1949 (aged 71); Sullivan, Indiana, U.S.
- Batted: Right Threw: Right

MLB debut
- September 20, 1901, for the St. Louis Cardinals

Last MLB appearance
- October 6, 1901, for the St. Louis Cardinals

MLB statistics
- Batting average: .212
- Home runs: 2
- Runs batted in: 7
- Stats at Baseball Reference

Teams
- St. Louis Cardinals (1901)

William Henry Richardson (January 24, 1878 – November 6, 1949) was an American first baseman in Major League Baseball. He played for the 1901 St. Louis Cardinals of the National League.
