= Cy Swaim =

American baseball player (1874–1945)

Cy Swaim (Full Name: John Hillary Swaim)
- Pitcher
- Born: March 11, 1874; Cadwallader, Ohio, U.S.
- Died: December 27, 1945 (aged 71); Eustis, Florida, U.S.
- Batted: Unknown Threw: Unknown

MLB debut
- May 3, 1897, for the Washington Senators

Last MLB appearance
- July 21, 1898, for the Washington Senators

MLB statistics
- Win–loss record: 12–22
- Strikeouts: 82
- Earned run average: 4.48
- Stats at Baseball Reference

Teams
- Washington Senators (1897–1898)

John Hillary Swaim (March 11, 1874 – December 27, 1945) was an American Major League Baseball pitcher. He played with the Washington Senators of the National League in 1897 and 1898. Prior to that he played with Mount Union College.

He died from pneumonia on the 27th of December, 1945.

== Sources ==
- Career statistics from Baseball Reference · Retrosheet · Baseball Almanac
