= Henry Youngman (baseball) =

American baseball player (1865–1936)

Henry Hugo Youngman (born Heinrich Hugo Jungmann; November 21, 1865 – January 24, 1936) was a professional baseball player. He played part of one season in Major League Baseball for the Pittsburgh Alleghenys in 1890.

In the 13 games he played, he batted .128 (6-for-47) with four RBIs. He also scored six runs. A second baseman and third baseman, he made 16 errors in 73 chances for a fielding percentage of .781, which was below the league average.

A native of Hörde, Germany, he died in Pittsburgh, Pennsylvania at the age of 70.
